= List of Valencian trinquets =

List of towns where there is a trinquet at the moment or there has been in the past. Bolded are the active trinquets.

== In Valencia city ==
- Trinquet de Cavallers, at the street of that name.
- Trinquet de Centelles, in the 16th century.
- Trinquet d'En Ciurana, cited in 1571, at the Plaça de la Mercé.
- Trinquet de l'Encarnació.
- Trinquet dels Faigs, according to the Llibre d'Aveïnaments, 1505.
- Trinquet de l'Hospital, next to the Porta del Reial and close to the bridge with the same name.
- Trinquet de Juan de Mena, end of the 19th century and first half of the 20th century.
- Trinquet Llevant del Grau, end of the 19th century and first half of the 20th century.
- Trinquet de Mossén Olcina, cited in 1484.
- Trinquet de Mossén Sanz.
- Trinquet del Pavorde, according to the Llibre d'Aveïnaments, 1505.
- **Trinquet de Pelayo**. The only one active right now.
- Trinquet dels Pilons or dels Mascons, because the owners were the Mascons family. Located at the Carrer Ruiz de Lihory, cited in 1534.
- Trinquet del Trabuquet. It was known as Trinquet del Bordell dels Negres before, and also as Trinquet de Mossén Cots. Cited in 1525.
- Trinquet de Na Segarra. Placed at the Carrer de la tertúlia. It was called Trinquet de la Morera in the 18th century.
- **Polytechnic University of Valencia's trinquet**.

== Around the Valencian Community ==
- Abdet, 1772, resembling to galotxetes courtfield.
- Aielo de Malferit
- Alicante
- **Alberic**
- Albuixec
- Alcàsser
- Alcoy
- Aldaia
- Alfarb
- Algemesí
- **Alginet**
- Almassora
- Almoines
- L'Alqueria d'Asnar
- Altea
- Alzira
- Bèlgida
- **Bellreguard**
- Benaguasil
- Benasau
- Beniarjó
- Beniarrés
- **Benidorm**
- Benifaió
- Benigànim
- Benimantell
- Benimarfull
- Beniopa
- Beniparrell
- **Benissa**
- Benissanó
- Bétera
- Bicorp (Under construction)
- Bocairent
- Borbotó
- Borriana
- Borriol
- Burjassot
- Calpe
- **El Campello**
- Canals
- Carcaixent
- **Càrcer**
- Carlet
- Casinos
- Castalla
- Castellar
- Castelló de la Plana
- **Castelló de la Ribera**
- **Castelló de Rugat**
- Catarroja
- Confrides
- Crevillent
- **Daimús**
- **Dénia**
- Elda
- **L'Eliana**
- Elche
- Foios
- Gandia
- Gata de Gorgos
- **El Genovés**
- Godelleta
- **Guadassuar**
- Jesús Pobre
- **Llíria**
- **La Llosa de Ranes**
- Llutxent
- **Manises**
- Massalfassar
- **Massamagrell**
- Meliana
- Moncofa
- Monòver
- Montcada
- **Murla**
- Muro d'Alcoi
- Museros
- **Oliva**
- L'Olleria
- Onda
- Ondara
- Onil
- Ontinyent
- Orba
- L'Orxa
- Palma de Gandia
- Parcent
- Paterna
- **Pedreguer**
- Pego
- **Petrer**
- **Piles**
- **La Pobla de Vallbona**
- Polinyà de Xúquer
- Quatretonda
- Rafelcofer
- Real de Gandía
- Real
- Riba-roja de Túria
- **Sagunt**
- Silla
- **Simat de la Valldigna**
- Sollana
- **Sueca**
- Tavernes de la Valldigna
- Torrent
- Traiguera
- Les Useres
- La Vila Joiosa
- **València**
- Vall d'Ebo
- La Vall d'Uixó
- Vilafamés
- Villalonga
- Vilamarxant
- **Vila-real**
- La Vilavella
- Villar del Arzobispo
- Xàbia
- Xaló
- Xelva
- **Xeraco**
- Xeresa
- Xest
- Xilxes

== Abroad ==
- Argentina:
  - San Juan

== See also ==
- List of the Valencian pilotaris
