= Palma de Gandia =

- Municipality
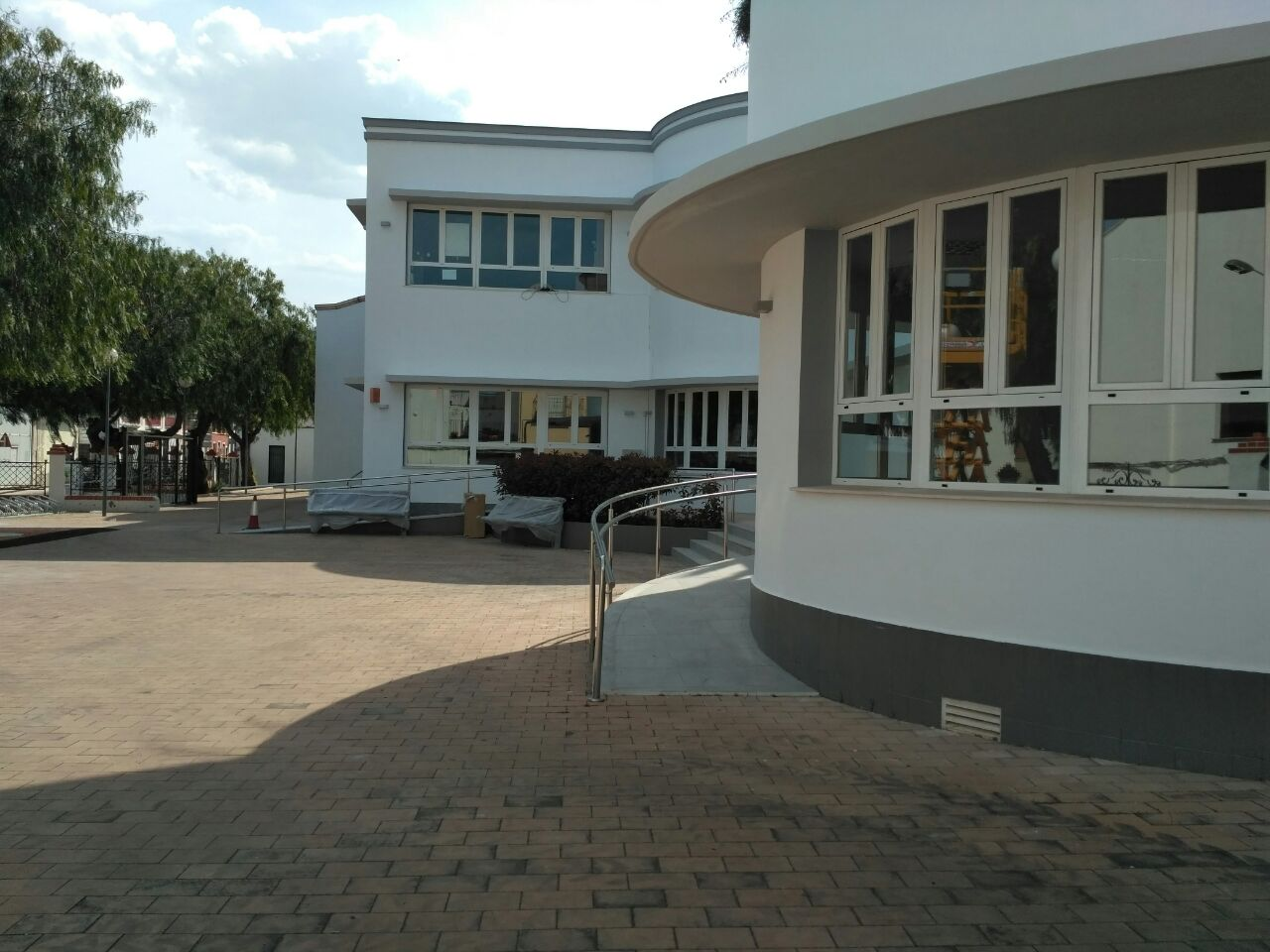
- Town hall

- Coat of arms

- Location in Spain
- Coordinates: 38°55′30″N 0°13′21″W
- Country: Spain
- Autonomous community: Valencian Community
- Province: Valencia
- Comarca: Safor
- Judicial district: Gandia

Government
  - Alcaldesa: Pepa Bosca (PP)

Area
  - Total: 14 km^{2} (5.4 sq mi)
- Elevation: 45 m (148 ft)

Population (2025-01-01)
  - Total: 1,897
  - Density: 140/km^{2} (350/sq mi)
- Demonym(s): Palmer, palmera
- Time zone: UTC+1 (CET)
  - Summer (DST): UTC+2 (CEST)
- Postal code: 46724
- Official language(s): Valencian
- Website: Official website

Palma de Gandia (Valencian pronunciation: [ˈpalma ðe ɣanˈdi.a]; Spanish: Palma de Gandía) is a municipality in the comarca of Safor in the Valencian Community, Spain.

The municipality of Palma de Gandia limited to the following locations: Ador, Alfauir, Beniarjó, Beniflà, Gandia, Potries, Real de Gandia and Ròtova, all in the province of Valencia.

== See also ==
- List of municipalities in Valencia
