= Ferrocarril Alcoy Gandia =

Ferrocarril Alcoy Gandía was a Spanish railway line in operation between 1892 and 1969. It was also known as la chicharra (Spanish) or xitxarra (Valencian).

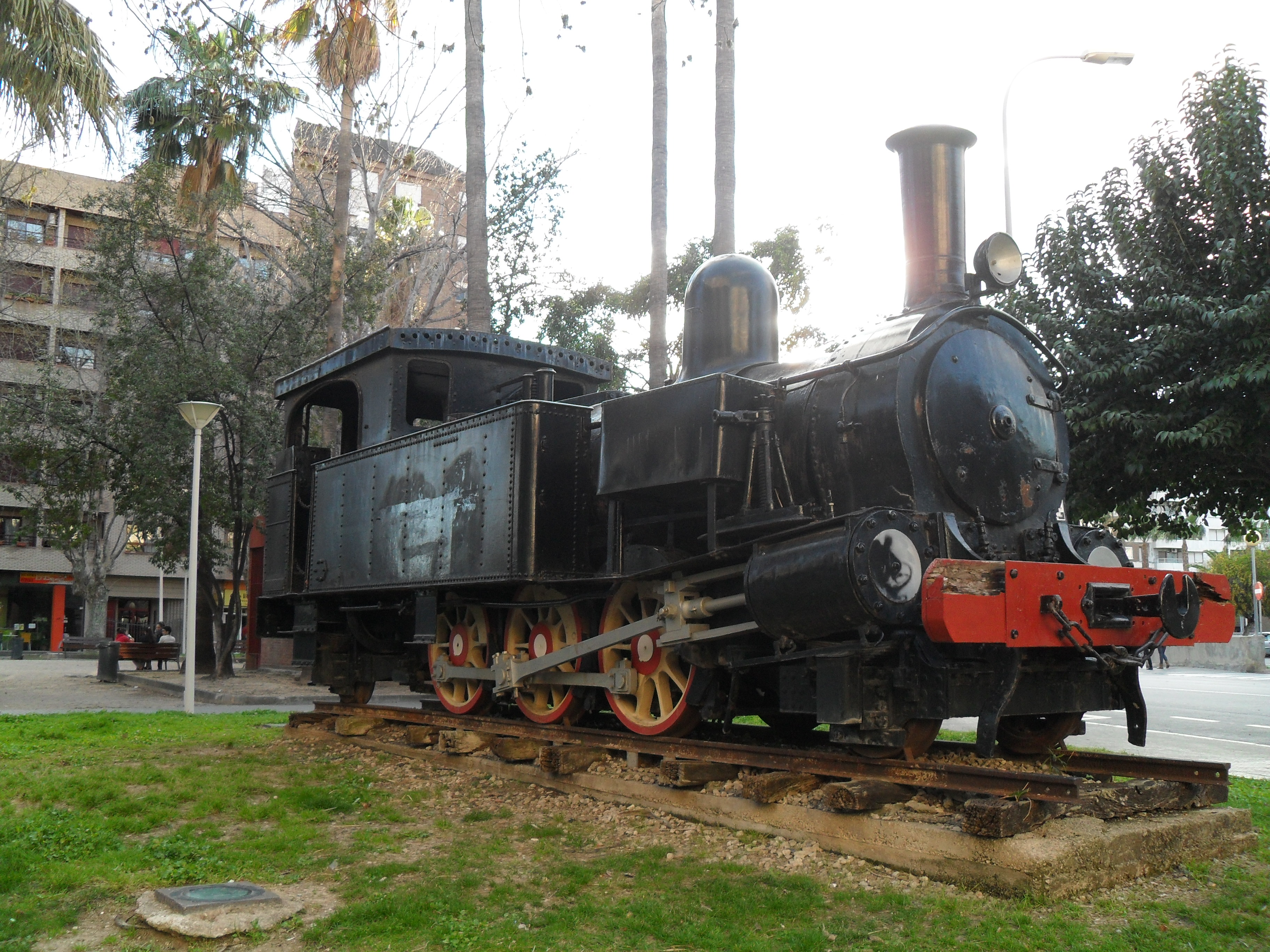
Antigua locomotora Alcoy-Gandia frente a la estación de ferrocarril de Gandía

== History ==
The railway company, founded in 1882 was known as the Alcoy y Gandía Rail and Harbour Co Ltd, with company offices in both Alcoy and London. Large investments in railway infrastructure were made by English companies in Spain during the late 19th century and helped to transform Spanish travel, industry and commerce. The main motive for English investment in a railway between Alcoy and Gandia was to promote the export of coal from England to supply the growing industry found in the area.

Railway construction was supervised and implemented by the Ravel Lucien Company.

The inaugural journey took place on July 18, 1892.

The line had connections with the Railway Company Villena to Alcoy and Yecla (V.A.Y.) sharing material and facilities, according to a contract signed on 13 October 1908.

The total length of the line was 53,355 m, with a height of 530 m between Alcoy and Gandia.

== Stations ==
The stations and halts were located in the towns of: Puerto de Gandia - Gandia harbour (0 km); Gandia (3 km); Almoines (7 km); Beniarjó (9 km); Potríes (11 km); Villalonga (14 km); Lorcha (27 km); Beniarrés (34 km); Gayanes (37 km); Muro de Alcoy (43 km); Cocentaina (46 km); Alcoy (53 km).

== Locomotives ==
The locomotive fleet consisted of eight 2-6-2T steam locomotives manufactured by Beyer, Peacock & Company, Manchester between 1890 and 1891. Each locomotive was named after a station served by the railway.

Locomotive no. 2 "Villalonga" is set on a plinth in the Al-Azraq area of Alcoy, which was the terminus of the railway. Locomotive no. 7, "Cocentaina" is set on a plinth at Gandía. Both preserved locomotives are able to be viewed by the public and can be photographed easily in situ.

== Museum ==
There is museum in Almoines, run by Asociación Tren Alcoy-Gandía. The current chairman José Morales and the current secretary is Isidro Ferrando.
