= Villalonga, Valencia =

Villalonga
- Municipality
- Vilallonga/Villalonga
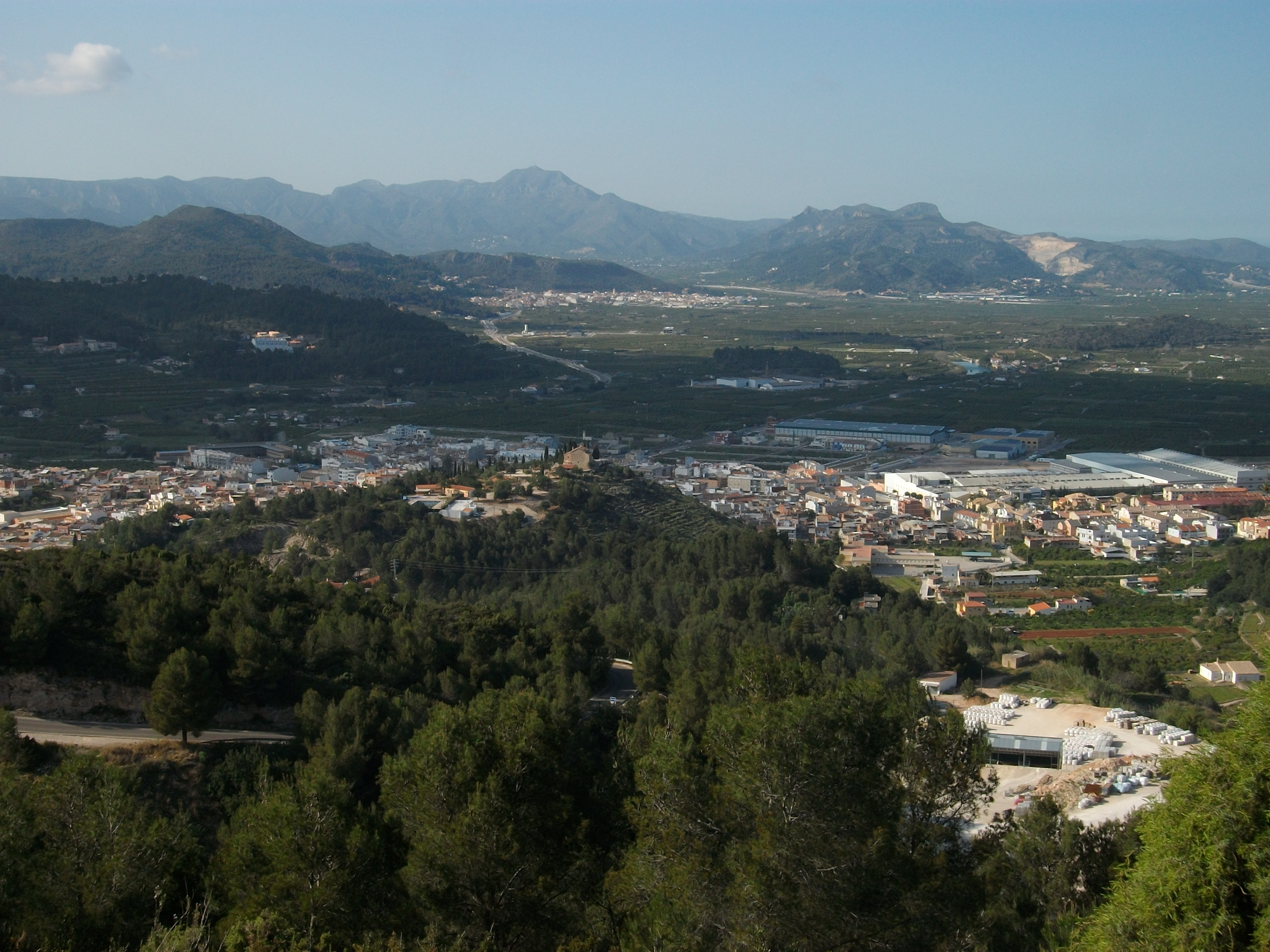

- Coat of arms

- Location in Spain
- Coordinates: 38°53′5″N 0°12′31″W
- Country: Spain
- Autonomous community: Valencian Community
- Province: Valencia
- Comarca: Safor
- Judicial district: Gandia

Government
  - Alcalde: Juanjo Sanchis (PSPV-PSOE)

Area
  - Total: 43.3 km^{2} (16.7 sq mi)
- Elevation: 92 m (302 ft)

Population (2025-01-01)
  - Total: 4,865
  - Density: 112/km^{2} (291/sq mi)
- Demonym(s): vilallonguer, -a (Val.) villalonguero, -a (Sp.)
- Time zone: UTC+1 (CET)
  - Summer (DST): UTC+2 (CEST)
- Postal code: 46720
- Official language(s): Valencian; Spanish
- Website: Official website

Villalonga, officially Vilallonga/Villalonga in (Valencian: [ˌvilaˈʎoŋɡa]) and (Spanish: [ˌbiʎaˈloŋɡa]), is a municipality in the Safor comarca of the Province of Valencia, in the Valencian Community, Spain. It is located on the northern slopes of the Safor mountain range, near the border with the Province of Alicante. The municipality has 4865 inhabitants.

== Geography ==
Vilallonga / Villalonga lies in a wide valley crossed by the Serpis River, which flows northeast towards the Mediterranean Sea. The surrounding terrain is characterized by mountains to the south and rolling agricultural land to the north.

The climate is Mediterranean, with hot summers (35–40 °C) and mild winters (−5 to 5 °C). Late summer and early autumn may bring episodes of gota freda or gota fría, intense storms that can deliver over 300 mm of rain in a single day.

The village is accessible from Valencia via the N-332 to Gandia, and then the CV-680 through Almoines, Beniarjó, Beniflá, and Potríes. A bus service connects Villalonga with Gandia and several nearby towns.

=== Neighbouring municipalities ===
Vilallonga / Villalonga borders Ador, Castellonet, La Font d'En Carròs, Llocnou de Sant Jeroni, Oliva, Potries and Terrateig (Valencia province); and L'Atzúbia, L'Orxa, and La Vall de Gallinera (Alicante province).

== History ==
Archaeological evidence indicates human presence since the Upper Paleolithic, with later Mesolithic and Chalcolithic remains. Sites such as Les Coves del Pastor (now destroyed) and the Cova del Racó del Duc were used for habitation or funerary purposes in prehistoric times.

In August 1240, James I of Aragon conquered the valley, granting the castle and lands to Diego López III de Haro, Lord of Biscay. Over subsequent centuries, the lordship passed through several noble families. In 1603 the barony was acquired by Pedro Franqueza y Esteve, who was later made Count of Villalonga by Philip III of Spain. After his downfall in 1606, the lands were administered directly by the Crown.

Following the Expulsion of the Moriscos (1609), Vilallonga / Villalonga was repopulated under a Carta Pobla signed on 26 January 1612. The surnames of these first Christian settlers included Bas de Mezquida, Carbó, Cifré, Estruch, Fuster, Martí, Mascarell, Puig, Reig, Rocher, Sanchis, and Tarrasó, among others.

== Economy ==
The economy is based on agriculture (notably orange groves in irrigated areas, and olives and other fruit trees on dry land), light industry, and services. Food manufacturer Vicky Foods (formerly Dulcesol) and ceramic production are major employers. Sheep, goat, and cattle farming exist on a small scale.

The town hosts a twice-weekly market (Tuesdays and Fridays) and serves as a commercial hub for neighbouring villages. In recent decades, urban expansion has been significant, though population growth has remained moderate.

== Landmarks ==
- Parish Church of the Epiphany, built 1719–1757, dedicated to the Magi.
- Hermitage of Saint Anthony Abbot and Saint Barbara.
- Chapel of Our Lady of the Fountain (Capella de la Verge de la Font), patron saint of Villalonga.
- Villalonga Castle, a Muslim-era hilltop castle with surviving walls, a cistern, and defensive terraces.
- Natural springs such as the Font de 4, Font de 2, Font de 16, and Font de la Safor.

== Culture and festivals ==
Major celebrations include:

- Saint Anthony Abbot (17 January) with animal blessings and a communal meal at the hermitage.
- Moros i Cristians (Moors and Christians) festival in October, preceding the patronal feasts.
- Patronal festivals in the third week of October honouring Our Lady of the Fountain, with processions, mascletàs, fireworks, concerts, and parades.
- Summer feasts in mid-August, including the feast of Saint Lawrence and traditional paella competitions.
- Holy Week processions.
- Corpus Christi, featuring a 50 m² coloured-sawdust carpet created annually for nearly 70 years by local artist Vicente Estevan.

== Transport and trails ==
The former Ferrocarril Alcoy-Gandía (Alcoy-Gandia railway) passed through Vilallonga / Villalonga until its closure in 1969. Plans exist to convert the route into the Vía Verde del Serpis, a 28 km greenway linking Muro de Alcoy to Villalonga along the Serpis River valley.

== See also ==
- List of municipalities in Valencia
