= Trapiche =

Wooden mill for extracting juice from fruit and sugarcane

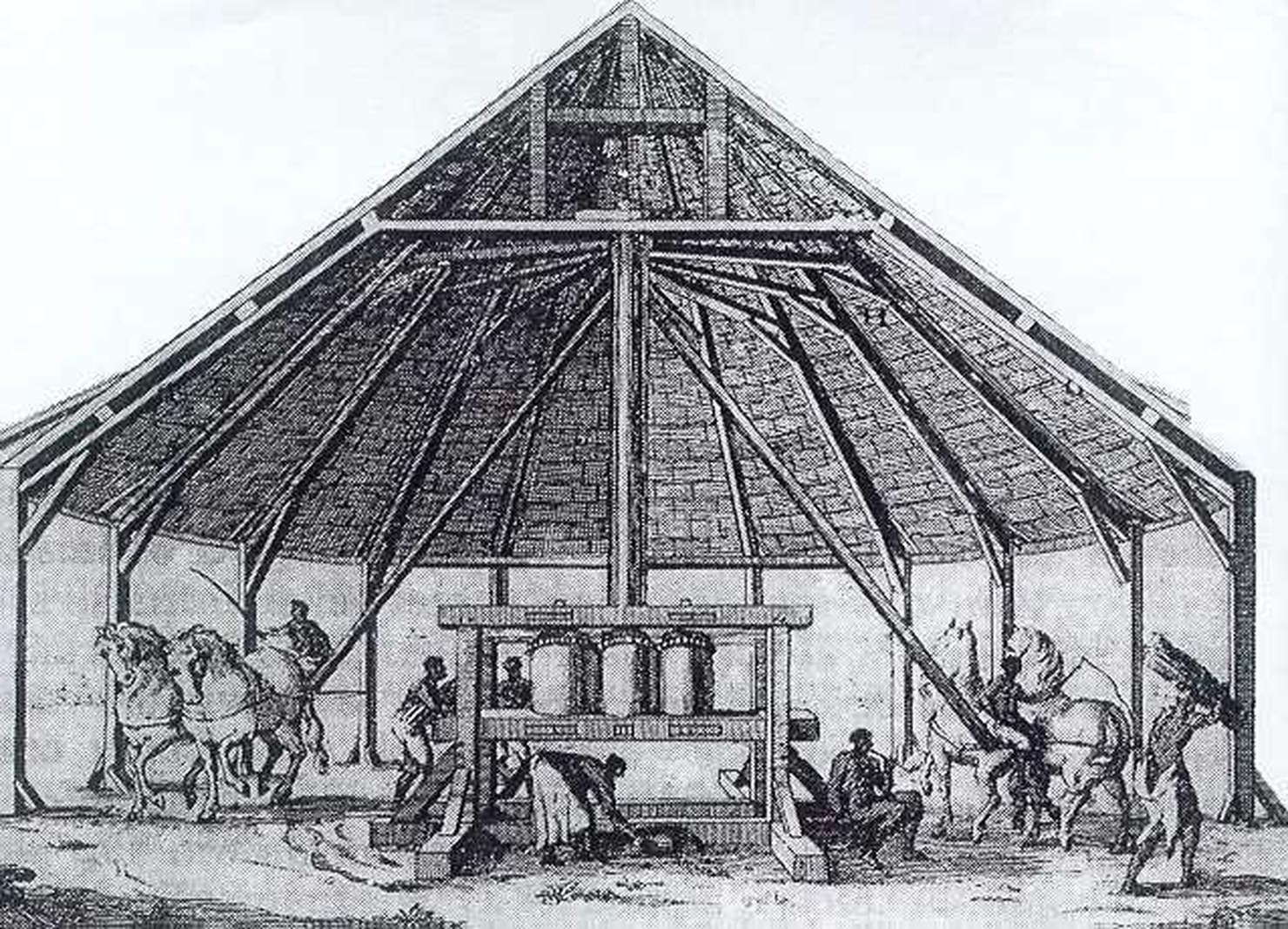
Trapiche in the island of The Hispaniola in an engraving of the 17th century

A trapiche is a mill made of wooden rollers used to extract juice from fruit, originally olives, and since the Middle Ages, sugar cane as well. By extension the word is also sometimes applied to the location of the mill, whether the workshop or the entire plantation.

== Etymology ==
The word has its origin in the Latin trapetum that means oil mill. From the Sicilian language trappitu the term, crossing the Mozarab from Valencia, with its typical change of termination to «-ig» via the Catalan language (trapig -Gandía, 1536-, trapitz de canyamel -Mallorca, 1466-) has arrived to the other languages of the Iberian peninsula as trapiche. In the documents of the Duke of Gandía from the beginning of the fifteen century, one can see the term «trapig de canyamel», as a synecdoche to indicate the whole village engenho. According to Herrera: "..es de notar que antiguamente no auuia azucar,ſino en Valencia" ("note that in the old days there was no sugar except in Valencia").

== Valencian Kingdom ==
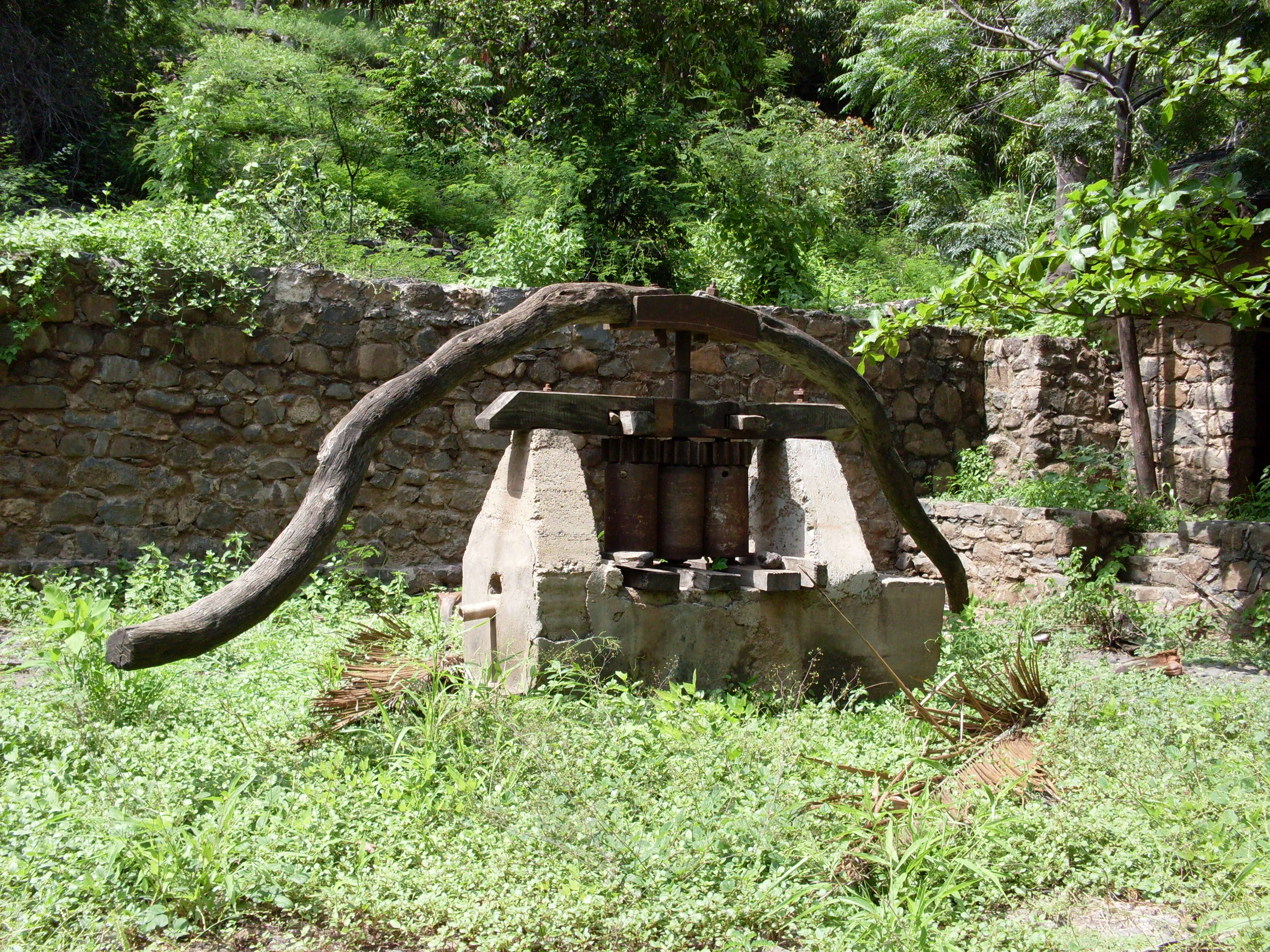
Trapiche (Mill of traditional sugar) in Cidade Velha

At the beginning of the fifteenth century, the Count of Oliva imported a method of cultivating sugar cane and techniques to extract the sugar from Sicily with the aid of Sicilian masters. A certain Galceran of Vic, lord of Xeresa built the first trapiche in Gandia. By 1433, there were already four and at the end of the century there were fourteen trapiches. A member of the Monastery of Valldigna saw the revenue of his trapiche grow 40% between 1434 and 1502. Attempts to introduce the new culture to Castelló were less successful. The culture of sugar cane was done mainly by the gentry and the bourgeoisie, as the farmers were not very motivated to change orchard lands into industrial culture. Sugar companies had to take lands on lease or encourage bourgeois owners to culture sugar cane.

In the second half of the 15th century, Hug of Cardona and Gandia yielded the monopoly of the exploitation of the sugar to Gandia to traders from the Magna Societas Alemannorum of Ravensburg. In the year 1500, the sector employed some 500 people and 220 animals. Pier Luigi de Borgia possessed three, and Ausiàs March had one in Beniarjó.

Many factors contributed to the decline of the sugar industry and trapiches in Gandia. In XVI "the engine", a faster and more efficient machine, appeared. It continued declining with the increase of the competition of Madeira, of the Canary Islands and of the Antilles that had a more suitable climate. The expulsion of the moriscos on October 4, 1609, was a fatal blow to an industry already in decline. The moriscos were the main cultivators of sugarcane and served as expert labour. Whole villages were empty. Felip III's decree was a disaster for the region and drove the ducal house to ruin.

The majority of the installations disappeared. Today only some vestiges of ancient trapiches and engines remain, and with the course of the time were reformed and immaterial in the toponymy, for example the Street trapiche to Gandia, the Square trapiche to Miramar and the Career trapiche to Xeresa. However, it seems that today many people forget the glorious past of the sugar industry in the duchy of Gandia 600 years ago.

== Caribbean ==
=== Canarian precedents ===
In the late 15th century, the horizontal two-roller engenho or trapiche transferred seamlessly from the Portuguese in the Madeira Islands to the Canary Islands just as the Castilians, still struggled to control the Guanches, the rebellious indigenous Canarians. They were, in fact, the first coerced workers of the fledgling sugar industry on these islands. As the Iberians colonized the archipelagos off the coast of West Africa they relocated here most of the Mediterranean agricultural industry making of these islands the center of technological advancement in the Atlantic World. And in a matter of two decades after Christopher Columbus touched down on the Bahamas, just across the ocean, the trapiche followed European colonists to the Caribbean. The first stop was the island of Hispaniola.

=== Hispaniola (Santo Domingo) ===
The trapiche's arrival to the Caribbean coincided with three crucial events in the early history of the Americas. They were the dramatic decline of the indigenous population, the arrival of the first enslaved Africans to the Americas and the sudden drop in the production of gold. While large numbers of colonists sought to escape the ensuing desolation and migrated to settle and desolate in turn other territories, those who stayed on Hispaniola turned to the sugar industry hustled at first by a mixture of enslaved indigenous people and Africans (ladinos and bozales). In a few more years, as the indigenous population retrieved, enslaved Blacks made up the bulk if not all of the coerced workers. With the promise of personal wealth implied in the system of slavery and with the advice of Canarian experts colonists began establishing some types of engenhos as early as 1514. According to Cronistas de Indias (Chroniclers of the Indies), Bartolomé de las Casas and Gonzalo Fernández de Oviedo y Valdés, it was Gonzales de Veloso (also, Gonzalez Veloso and Gonzalo de Vellosa) who built in what today is San Cristobal the first two-roller trapiche pulled by horses on Hispaniola. From there, it turned up on the Island of San Juan Bautista (Puerto Rico) and later in Cuba.

=== Three rollers ===
Though most current examples of trapiches in the Spanish Caribbean are of the three-rollers, according to scholar Anthony R. Stevens-Acevedo, the horizontal two-roller trapiche was the type used in the Caribbean throughout the end of the 16th century. As this piece of technology moved south to Tierra Firme (South America), the trapiche not only acquired a new roller, but it also erected all three of them to become a more efficient instrument of the expanding sugar industry. In this more elaborate shape, it soon returned to the Caribbean as the backbone of the sugar engenho.

== South America ==
=== Sugar cane industry ===
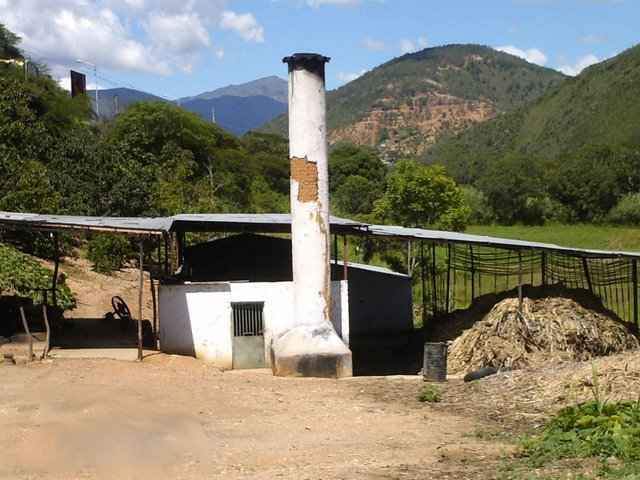
Trapiche in Carache, State of Trujillo, Venezuela.

Nowadays, the majority of the ingenios in Argentina or (engenhos in Brazil), use a trapiche to grind the sugarcane and extract its juice. They used water vapor as a driving force for mechanisms. In Latin America one can see small and transportable "street trapiches" handled by just one person. They can be installed almost anywhere to produce fresh cane juice. Its manufacture is artisanal, having even wooden gears.

=== Mining environment ===
In Argentina, Bolivia and Chile the term also applies to a type of mill used to reduce different kinds of minerals to dust. In the seventeenth century, these facilities and the raw material (ore, wages, the lease of the site and water, buildings ...) needed a considerable investment, the major part of it held by wealthy colonial elite.

Among the general mechanisms by which the Chilean economic life developed in the colonial era, the trapiches were a highly profitable investment. On the other hand, the perception of metals as means of payment for its use, offered a source of profitability, as they were connected to the commercial circuit of gold but outside the margins of local production centers.

Chileans who went to the California gold rush introduced the trapiche to Western United States where be known as Chilean mill. Along with Chilean miners who left California for the Australian gold rushes in the early 1850s the Chilean mill found its way to Australia where it became common.

== See also ==
- Chilean mill

== Bibliography ==
- Barceló, Miquel. El feudalisme comptat i debatut: Formació i expansió del feudalisme català. València, Universitat de València, 2003, ISBN 9788437056715
- Nuez Viñals, Fernando. La herencia árabe en la agricultura y el bienestar de occidente (in Spanish). València, Universitat Politècnica de València, 2002, 445 pàgines,
- Pons Moncho, Francisco. Trapig: La producción de azucar en la Safor (siglos XIV–XVIII). Publicaciones del Instituto Duque Real Alonso el Viejo, Ajuntament de Gandia, 1979, 127 pàgines, ISBN 978-8450034769
- Sucre & Borja. La canyamel dels Ducs. Del trapig a la taula. Catàleg de l'Exposició, Gandia. Casa de la Cultura "Marqués de González de Quirós", 2000
