= Vicente Todolí =

Contemporary art curator

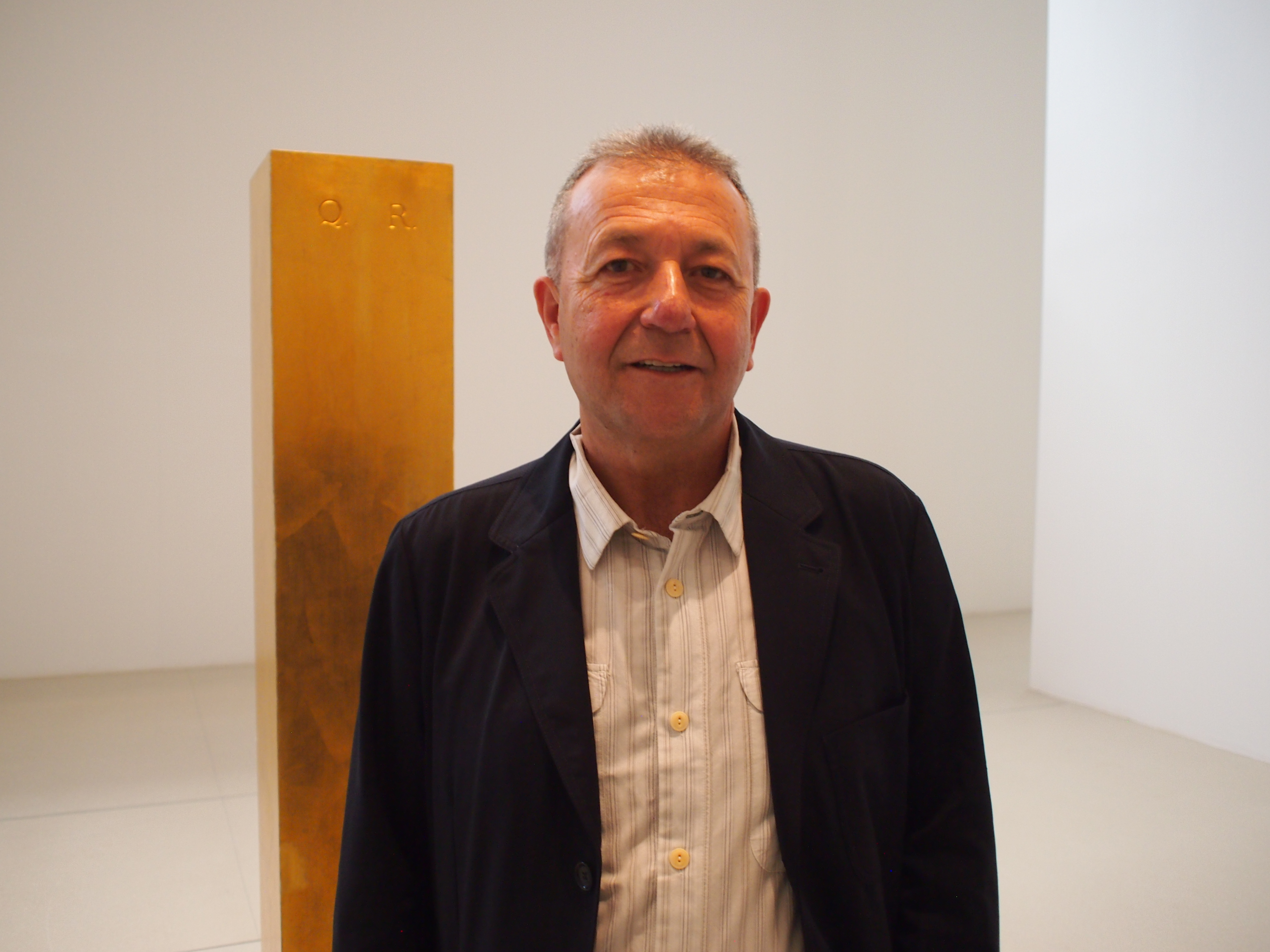
- Born: 1958; Palmera, Valencia, Spain
- Education: University of Valencia; University of Yale
- Occupation: curator
- Known for: Former director of Tate Modern
- Title: artistic director, Pirelli HangarBicocca
- Term: since 2012

Vicente Todolí (Valencia, 1958) is a Spanish contemporary art curator who has worked as the director of several museums and art centres internationally, including the Tate Modern in London.

== Education ==
After earning a degree in Art History from the University of Valencia, Todoli carried postgraduate studies at Yale University between 1981 and 1982 as a Fulbright Scholar. He then went to the City University of New York and was also an intern at the Whitney Museum of American Art in 1984–85.

== Career ==
With a career in the arts sector spanning over 30 years, Todolí was Chief Curator (1986–88) and then artistic director (1988–96) of the Valencia Institute of Modern Art in Spain. In 1996 he was appointed as the founding director of the Serralves Museum in Porto, which opened to the public in 1999 and quickly built an international reputation, becoming also the most visited museum in Portugal.

His appointment as Tate Modern Director was announced by the Trustees of Tate in 2002 and he held that position from 2003 until his resignation in 2010. The press release announcing his resignation quoted him stating that after seven years at IVAM, another seven years at Serralves and further seven years at Tate Modern, it was his intention to take a break at that point. The same press release quoted Sir Nicholas Serota, then Director of the Tate, saying: "Vicente has made an enormous contribution to the success of Tate Modern during his period in London. His distinctive vision has shaped the display of the Collection, while a series of exhibitions has redefined early modernism."

The Guardian also published an editorial praising his work and concluding that his "curiosity, wit, rigour and passion make him a model for future directors of Tate Modern." Some of the major exhibitions he organised at Tate Modern were devoted to Wassily Kandinsky (2006); Josef Albers and László Moholy-Nagy (2006); Salvador Dalí (2007); Marcel Duchamp, Man Ray and Francis Picabia (2008); Alexander Rodchenko and Liubov Popova (2009); and Theo Van Doesburg (2010).

Currently, since 2012, Todolí is the artistic director of the Pirelli HangarBicocca gallery in Milan, where he has curated exhibitions of artists such as, for example, Cildo Meireles (2014), Juan Muñoz (2015), Carsten Höller (2016), Kishio Suga (2016–17), Miroslaw Balka (2017), Mario Merz (2018–19), and Maurizio Cattelan (2021-22 co-curated with Roberta Tenconi).

He is also a trustee of the Fundació Per Amor a l'Art, which began to build a contemporary art collection in 2010 under his direction and opened the Bombas Gens Centre d'Art in Valencia in 2017. Since 2003, he has been a member of the Botin Foundation's Visual Arts Advisory Committee and became its president in 2011.

Some of the awards and accolades he has received in recognition of his achievements include the appointed as Chevalier (Knight) of the Ordre des Arts et des Lettres (France), the badge of the Order of Saint James of the Sword (Portugal), and an Honorary Doctorate from the Technical University of Valencia (Spain).

== Botanical and gastronomical interests ==
In 2012 he established the Todolí Citrus Foundation in Palmera (Valencia), the place where he was born. Its goal is to preserve the genetic diversity and heritage of citrus trees by means of an orchard of more than 400 varieties, . He decided to create the foundation during a trip to Perpignan with Ferràn Adria, a world-famous chef and a friend of his, where they visited a private collection of 80 varieties of citrus grown in pots. Apart from the orchard itself, the foundation also has a gastronomical lab, a library, and an ethnobotanical museum.
