= Tavernes de la Valldigna =

- Municipality
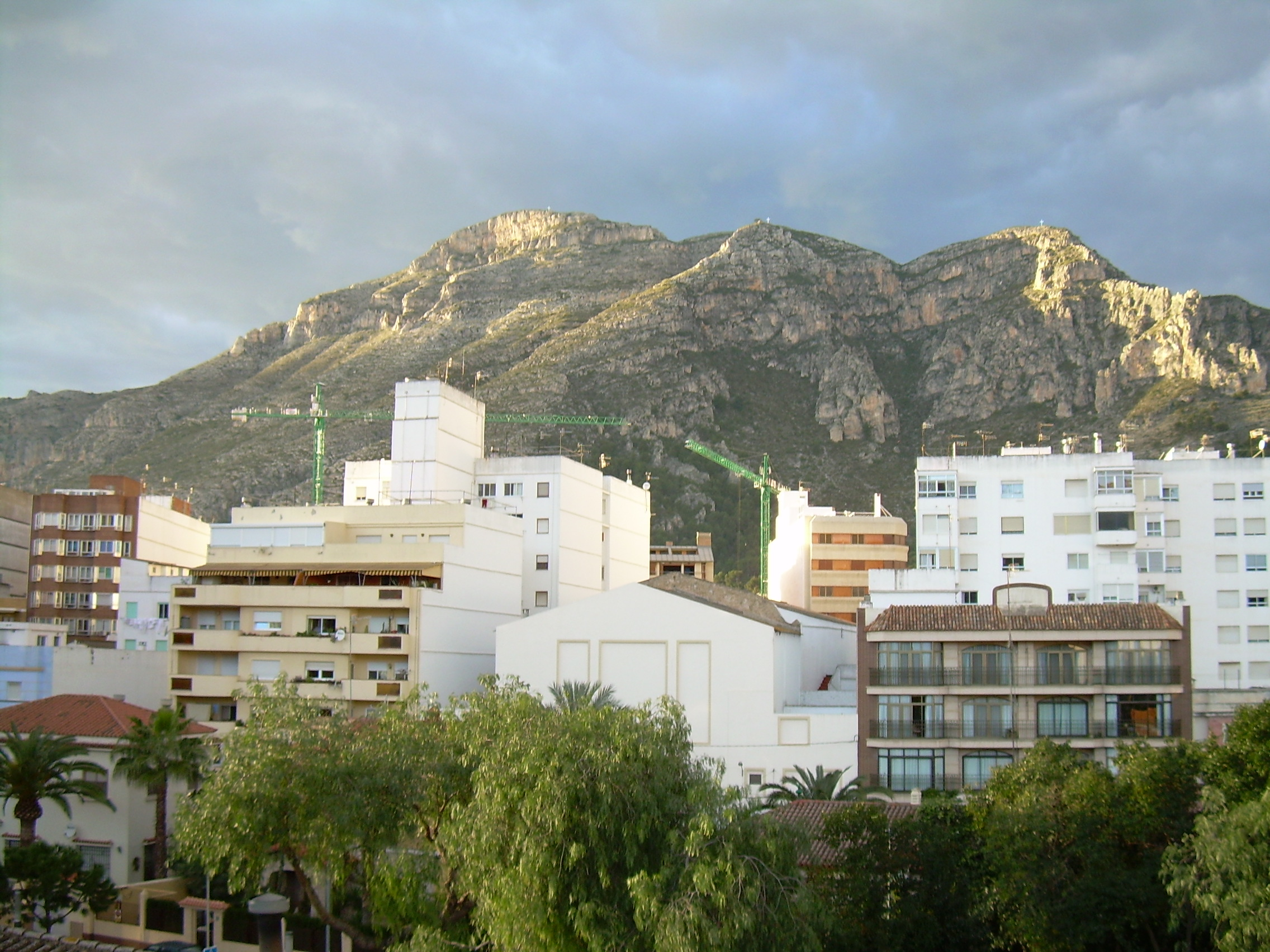

- Flag Coat of arms

- Location of Tavernes de la Valldigna in the Province of Valencia Location of Tavernes de la Valldigna in the Valencian Community Location of Tavernes de la Valldigna in Spain
- Coordinates: 39°4′20″N 0°15′57″W
- Country: Spain
- Autonomous community: Valencian Community
- Province: Valencia
- Comarca: La Safor
- Judicial district: Sueca

Government
  - Alcalde: Sergi González Frasquet (2019 - ) ([Compromís])

Area
  - Total: 49.2 km^{2} (19.0 sq mi)
- Elevation: 15 m (49 ft)

Population (2025-01-01)
  - Total: 17,866
  - Density: 363/km^{2} (941/sq mi)
- Demonym: Valler/a or Tavernenc/a
- Time zone: UTC+1 (CET)
  - Summer (DST): UTC+2 (CEST)
- Postal code: 46760
- Official language(s): Valencian
- Website: Official website

Tavernes de la Valldigna (Valencian pronunciation: [taˈvɛɾnez ðe la vaʎˈdiŋna], Spanish: Tavernes de la Valldigna) is a municipality in the Valencian Community, Spain, located in the district of Safor, 54 km far away from Valencia. It is the biggest town in La Valldigna, a horseshoe shape valley bordered by mountains (Iberian and Betic mountains) on the west and the Mediterranean Sea to the east. Tavernes gained a City title in December 1916, by King Alfonso XIII. According to the Spanish Statistic National Institute, INE, in 2010 there were 18.130 inhabitants in Tavernes: 9.126 men and 9.004 women.

== Geography ==
Located in the north-east of la Safor county, it is 56 km far from Valencia, at the east part of the Valldigna valley. On the north the Massalari valley and the Agulles mountains, with two peaks called Les Creus (540 m) and Massalari peak (598 m), the Mondúver peak is located to the south. The valley has a river called Vaca. The city is located 15 metres above sea level, and has excellent beaches and touristic mountain routes. The nearest cities are: Cullera, Favara, Benifairó de la Valldigna and Xeraco in the province of Valencia.

== Monuments ==
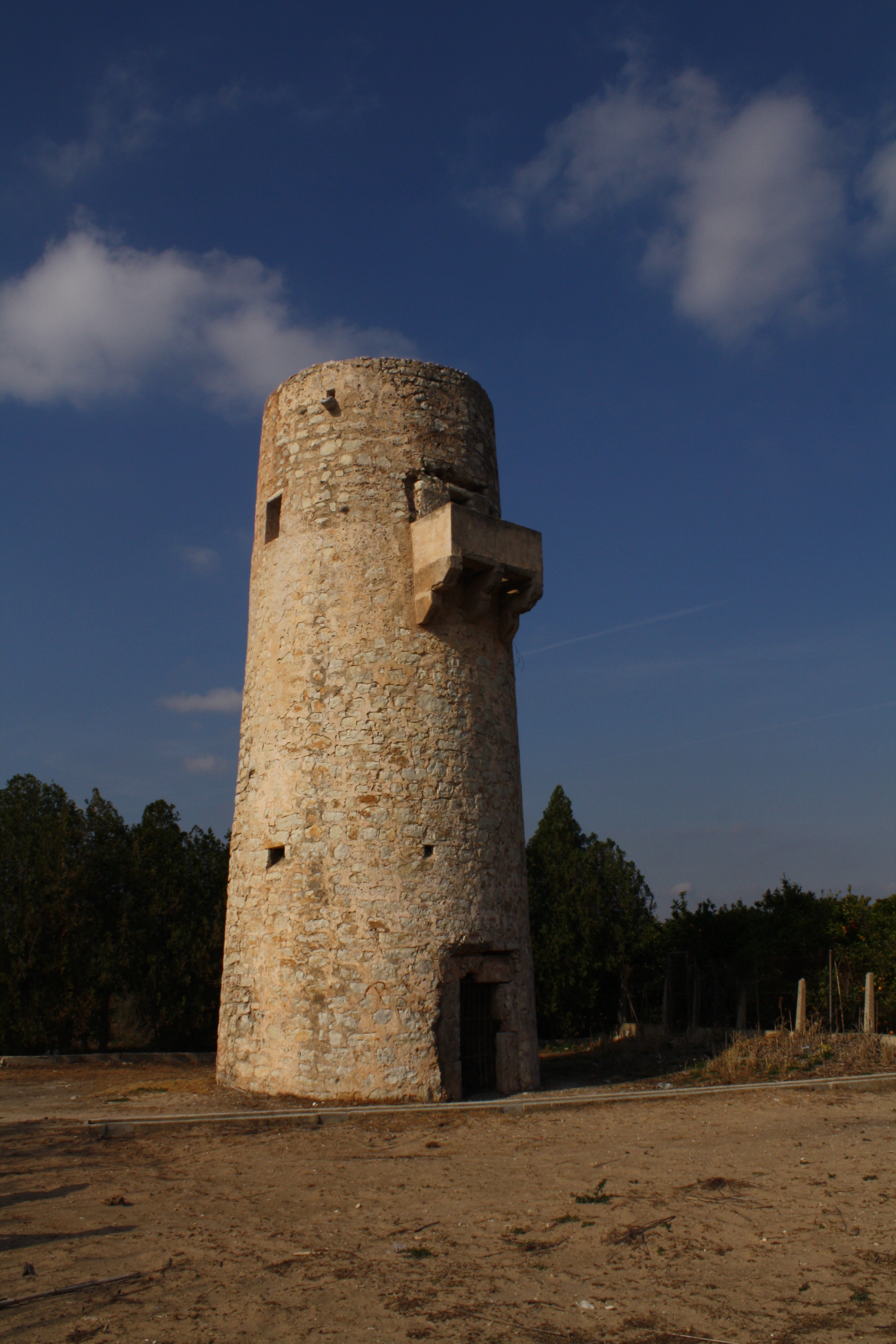
Torre de Guaita

The Valley Tower, also known as Torre de guaita or Torre de la Vall, is close to the main entrance to the beach part of town, built in the 16th century. Its surroundings are now used as a leisure area and it was part of the Mediterranean watchtowers net and it is considered a Bien de Interés Cultural, a category of the Spanish heritage register, with the number R-I-51-0010817.

The parish church of Saint Peter is located at the center of the city, close to the Town Hall. We can stand out the façades and the restored sundial.

There are ruins of an old Moorish castle overlooking the Valldigna valley in an area known as "Els Castellets", located on the route towards the mountain of the crosses (Tres Creus).

== Notable people ==
- César Ferrando, football player and manager
- Ximo Enguix, former footballer
- Carlos Espí, footballer

== See also ==
- List of municipalities in Valencia
