= Ximo Enguix =

Spanish footballer

Personal information
- Full name: Joaquín Enguix Pachés
- Date of birth: 18 February 1978 (age 48)
- Place of birth: Tavernes de la Valldigna, Spain
- Height: 1.80 m (5 ft 11 in)
- Position: Midfielder

Senior career*
Years	Team	Apps	(Gls)
1997–2002	Valencia B	145	(14)
2002–2005	Valencia	2	(0)
2003	→ Salamanca (loan)	21	(1)
2003–2004	→ Recreativo (loan)	25	(0)
2004–2005	→ Poli Ejido (loan)	30	(0)
2005–2006	Sporting Gijón	35	(0)
2006–2009	Rayo Vallecano	93	(5)
2009–2010	Castellón	20	(0)
2010–2011	Melilla	24	(0)
2011–2012	Toledo	21	(0)
2012–2014	Sueca		
Total		416	(20)
- * Club domestic league appearances and goals

Joaquín 'Ximo' Enguix Pachés (born 18 February 1978 in Tavernes de la Valldigna, Valencia) is a Spanish retired footballer who played as a defensive midfielder.
