= L'Alqueria de la Comtessa =

L'Alqueria de la Comtessa L'Alqueria de la Comtessa (Valencian) Alquería de la Condesa (Spanish)
- Municipality
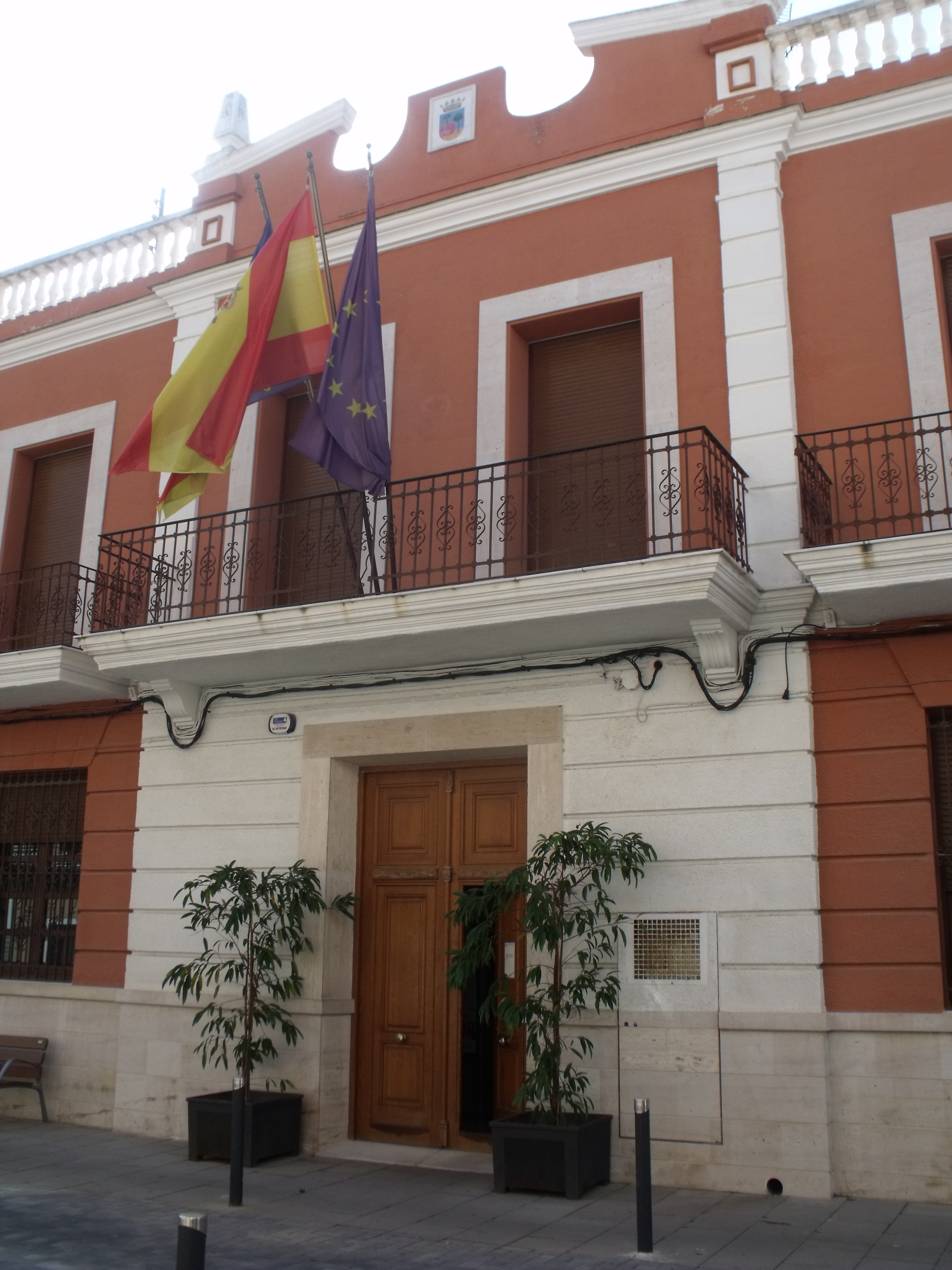
- Town hall

- Flag Coat of arms

- Location in Spain
- Coordinates: 38°56′10″N 0°9′16″W
- Country: Spain
- Autonomous community: Valencian Community
- Province: Valencia
- Comarca: Safor
- Judicial district: Gandia

Government
  - Alcalde: Salvador Femenía Peiró

Area
  - Total: 2.15 km^{2} (0.83 sq mi)
- Elevation: 16 m (52 ft)

Population (2025-01-01)
  - Total: 1,547
  - Density: 720/km^{2} (1,860/sq mi)
- Demonym(s): Alquerià, alqueriana
- Time zone: UTC+1 (CET)
  - Summer (DST): UTC+2 (CEST)
- Postal code: 46715
- Official language(s): Valencian
- Website: Official website

L'Alqueria de la Comtessa (Valencian: [lalkeˈɾi.a ðe la komˈtesa]; Spanish: Alquería de la Condesa [alkeˈɾi.a ðe la konˈdesa] is a municipality in the comarca of Safor in the Valencian Community, Spain. Traditionally based on agriculture, the cultivated area occupies most of the communal lands. In the dry part, there are olive trees and carob trees. In the irrigated part, which occupies a more important place, the cultivation of oranges is dominant.

== See also ==
- List of municipalities in Valencia
