= Benirredrà =

- Municipality
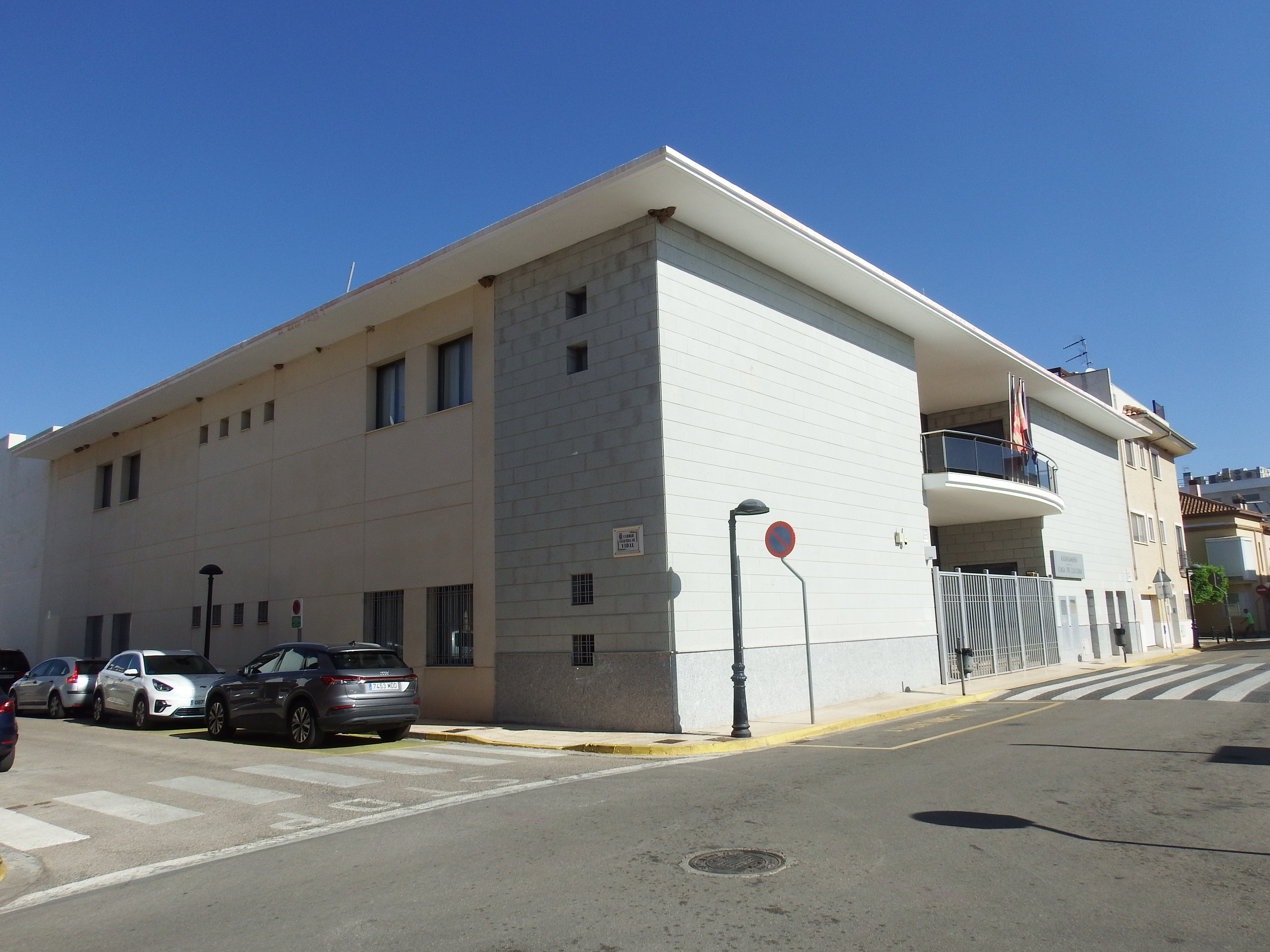
- Town hall

- Flag Coat of arms

- Location in Spain
- Coordinates: 38°57′40″N 0°11′31″W
- Country: Spain
- Autonomous community: Valencian Community
- Province: Valencia
- Comarca: Safor
- Judicial district: Gandia

Government
  - Alcalde: Loles Cardona Llopis

Area
  - Total: 0.4 km^{2} (0.15 sq mi)
- Elevation: 25 m (82 ft)

Population (2025-01-01)
  - Total: 1,576
  - Density: 3,900/km^{2} (10,000/sq mi)
- Demonym(s): Benirredrà, benirredrana
- Time zone: UTC+1 (CET)
  - Summer (DST): UTC+2 (CEST)
- Postal code: 46703
- Official language(s): Valencian
- Website: Official website

Benirredrà (Valencian pronunciation: [benireˈðɾa], Spanish: Benirredrá) is a municipality in the comarca of Safor in the Valencian Community, Spain.

== See also ==
- List of municipalities in Valencia
