= Guardamar de la Safor =

- Municipality
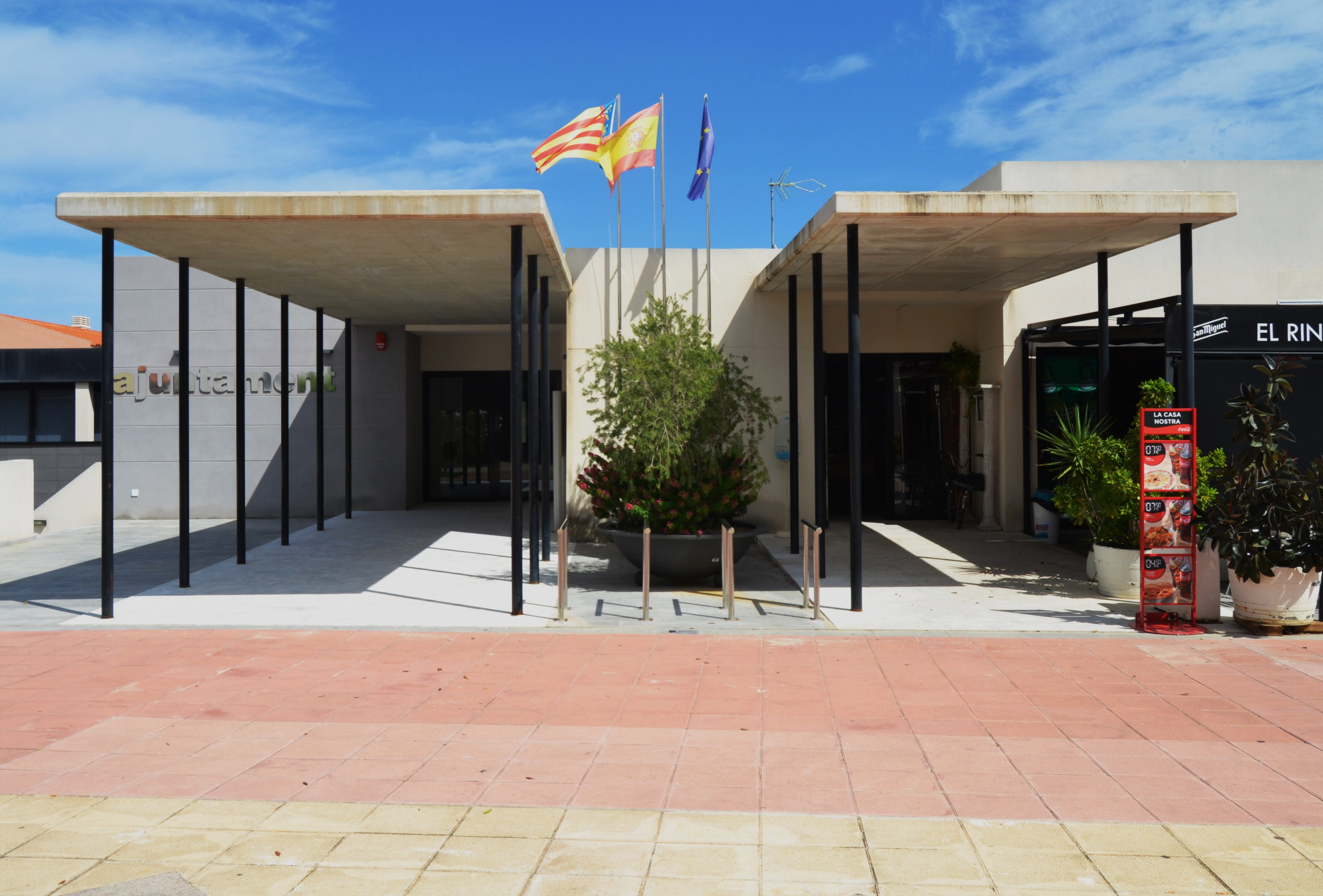
- Town hall

- Coat of arms

- Location in Spain
- Coordinates: 38°57′40″N 0°9′1″W
- Country: Spain
- Autonomous community: Valencian Community
- Province: Valencia
- Comarca: Safor
- Judicial district: Gandia

Government
  - Alcalde: José Martínez Moncho (BLOC)

Area
  - Total: 1.1 km^{2} (0.42 sq mi)
- Elevation: 11 m (36 ft)

Population (2025-01-01)
  - Total: 622
  - Density: 570/km^{2} (1,500/sq mi)
- Demonym(s): Guardamarenc, guardamarenca
- Time zone: UTC+1 (CET)
  - Summer (DST): UTC+2 (CEST)
- Postal code: 46711
- Official language(s): Valencian
- Website: Official website

Guardamar de la Safor (Valencian pronunciation: [ˌɡwaɾðaˈmaɾ ðe la saˈfoɾ]) is a municipality in the comarca of Safor in the Valencian Community, Spain.

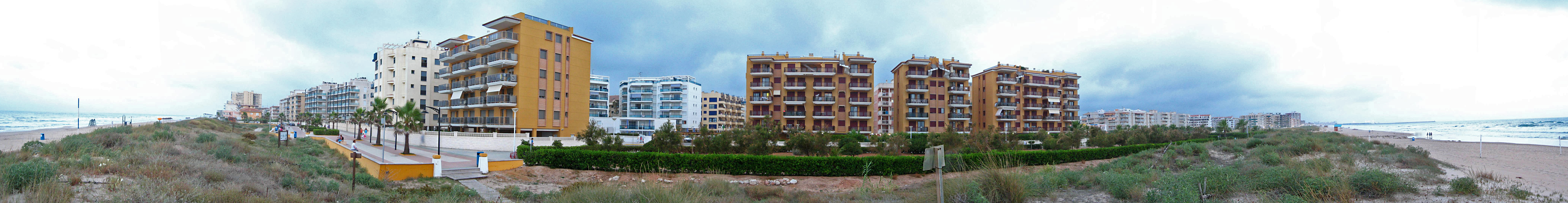
180° panoramic view from the beach

== See also ==
- List of municipalities in Valencia
