= Safor =

Coordinates: 38.9756°N 0.214061°W

- Comarca
- Country: Spain
- Autonomous community: Valencian Community
- Province: València / Valencia
- Capital and largest city: Gandia
- Municipalities: 31 municipalities: Ador, Alfauir, Almiserà, Almoines, L'Alqueria de la Comtessa, Barx, Bellreguard, Beniarjó, Benifairó de la Valldigna, Beniflà, Benirredrà, Castellonet de la Conquesta, Daimús, La Font d'En Carròs, Gandia, Guardamar de la Safor, Llocnou de Sant Jeroni, Miramar, Oliva, Palma de Gandia, Palmera, Piles, Potries, Rafelcofer, Real de Gandia, Ròtova, Simat de la Valldigna, Tavernes de la Valldigna, Villalonga, Xeraco, Xeresa

Area
  - Total: 429.80 km^{2} (165.95 sq mi)

Population (2006)
  - Total: 170,644
  - Density: 397.03/km^{2} (1,028.3/sq mi)
- Time zone: UTC+1 (CET)
  - Summer (DST): UTC+2 (CEST)

Safor (Valencian: [saˈfoɾ]; Spanish: [saˈfoɾ]) is a comarca within the province of Valencia, Valencian Community, Spain. The capital is the city of Gandia, but also includes the towns of Oliva, Piles and Daimús, among others. The beach area of Gandia, La Platja, is well known for its wild nightlife during the summer.

The former natural and historical comarca of Valldigna has been integrated into Safor comarca for administrative purposes.

== Municipalities ==
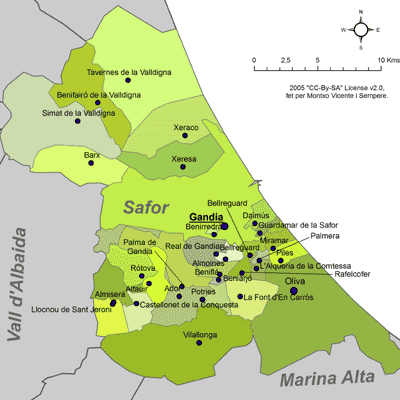
Municipalities of Safor

- Ador
- Alfauir
- Almiserà
- Almoines
- L'Alqueria de la Comtessa
- Barx
- Bellreguard
- Beniarjó
- Benifairó de la Valldigna
- Beniflà
- Benirredrà
- Castellonet de la Conquesta
- Daimús
- La Font d'En Carròs
- Gandia
- Guardamar de la Safor
- Llocnou de Sant Jeroni
- Miramar
- Oliva
- Palma de Gandia
- Palmera
- Piles
- Potries
- Rafelcofer
- Real de Gandia
- Ròtova
- Simat de la Valldigna
- Tavernes de la Valldigna
- Villalonga
- Xeraco
- Xeresa

== Climate ==
The predominant climate in Safor is mediterranean-subtropical (Köppen climate classification: CSa) with very mild temperatures during winters, and hot summers. The annual average temperature depends on the zone, different temperature ranges occur near the sea to the mountains inland. Near the sea the average annual temperature is about 18-20 °C while in the interior the average annual temperatures are about 17-18 °C. Almost all of the cultivars in this zone are oranges and tangerines, so the majority of the zones are frostless. The rain quantity are different, with zones that can be considered as subtropical semi-arid BSh climates, and others that pertain to the CSa mediterranean climate with hot summers. The wettest season is autumn.

== See also ==
- Monastery of Sant Jeroni de Cotalba
- Route of the Monasteries of Valencia
- Route of the Borgias
