= Beniflá =

Beniflá Beniflà (Valencian) Beniflá (Spanish)
- Municipality
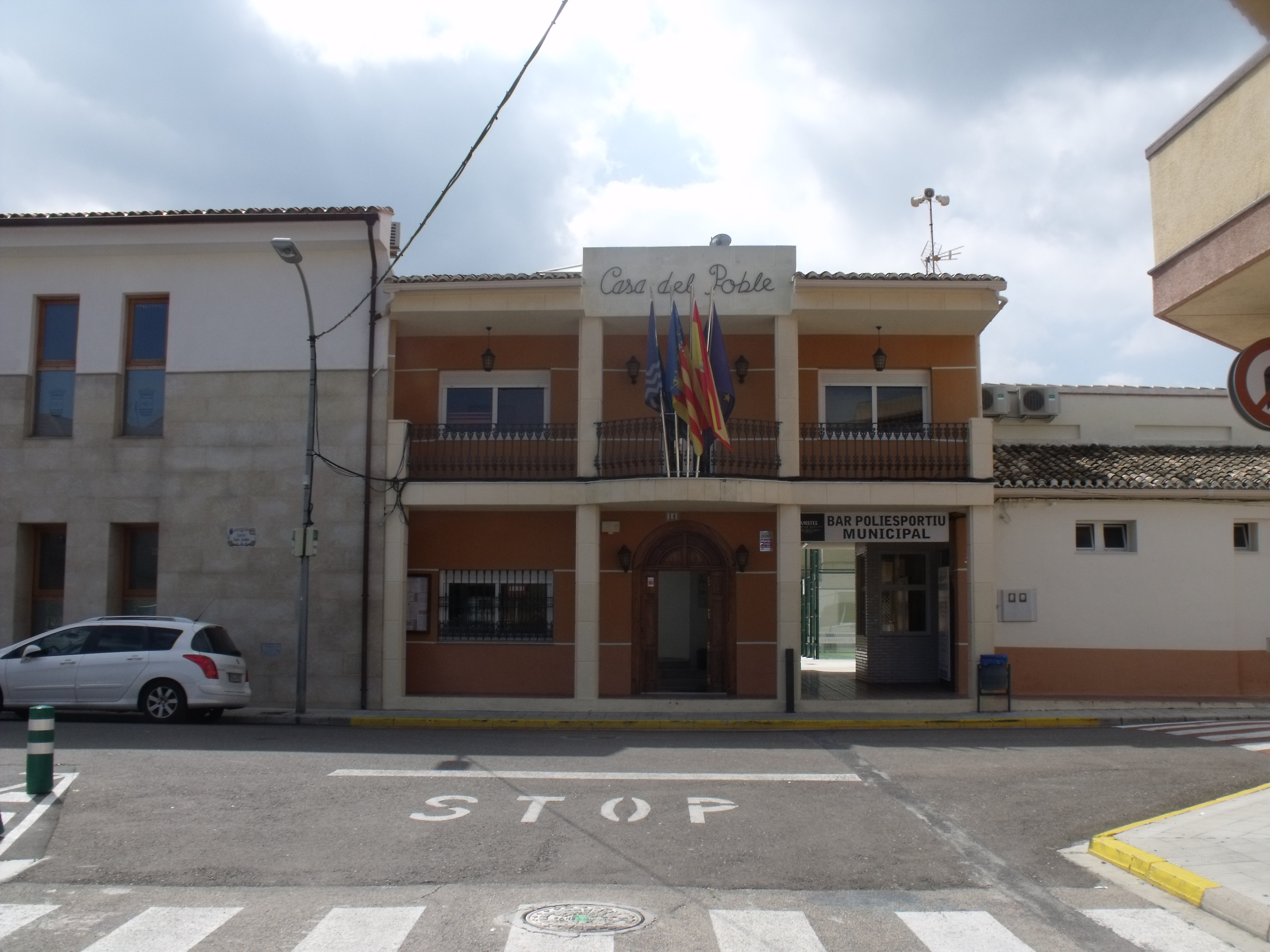
- Beniflà town hall

- Flag Coat of arms

- Location in Spain
- Coordinates: 38°55′44″N 0°11′21″W
- Country: Spain
- Autonomous community: Valencian Community
- Province: Valencia
- Comarca: Safor
- Judicial district: Gandia

Government
  - Alcalde: Salvador Castella Navarro

Area
  - Total: 0.62 km^{2} (0.24 sq mi)
- Elevation: 50 m (160 ft)

Population (2025-01-01)
  - Total: 505
  - Density: 810/km^{2} (2,100/sq mi)
- Demonym(s): Beniflater, beniflatera
- Time zone: UTC+1 (CET)
  - Summer (DST): UTC+2 (CEST)
- Postal code: 46722
- Official language(s): Valencian
- Website: Official website

Beniflá (Spanish: [beniˈfla]; Valencian: Beniflà [beniˈfla]) is a municipality in the region of Safor in the Valencian Country, Spain. As the crow flies, it is approximately 63 km (39 miles) away from Valencia.

== See also ==
- List of municipalities in Valencia
