= La Font d'En Carròs =

- Municipality
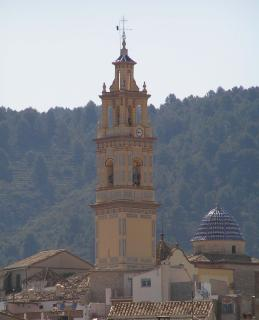

- Coat of arms

- Location in Spain
- Coordinates: 38°55′0″N 0°10′12″W
- Country: Spain
- Autonomous community: Valencian Community
- Province: Valencia
- Comarca: Safor
- Judicial district: Gandia

Government
  - Alcalde: Gaspar Pérez Fuster (2007) (PP)

Area
  - Total: 9.9 km^{2} (3.8 sq mi)
- Elevation: 45 m (148 ft)

Population (2025-01-01)
  - Total: 4,020
  - Density: 410/km^{2} (1,100/sq mi)
- Demonym(s): Fonter, fontera
- Time zone: UTC+1 (CET)
  - Summer (DST): UTC+2 (CEST)
- Postal code: 46717
- Official language(s): Valencian
- Website: Official website

La Font d'En Carròs (Valencian pronunciation: [la ˈfɔnd deŋ kaˈrɔs]; Spanish: Fuente Encarroz) is a municipality in the comarca of Safor in the Valencian Community, Spain.

== See also ==
- List of municipalities in Valencia
