= Palmera =

- Municipality
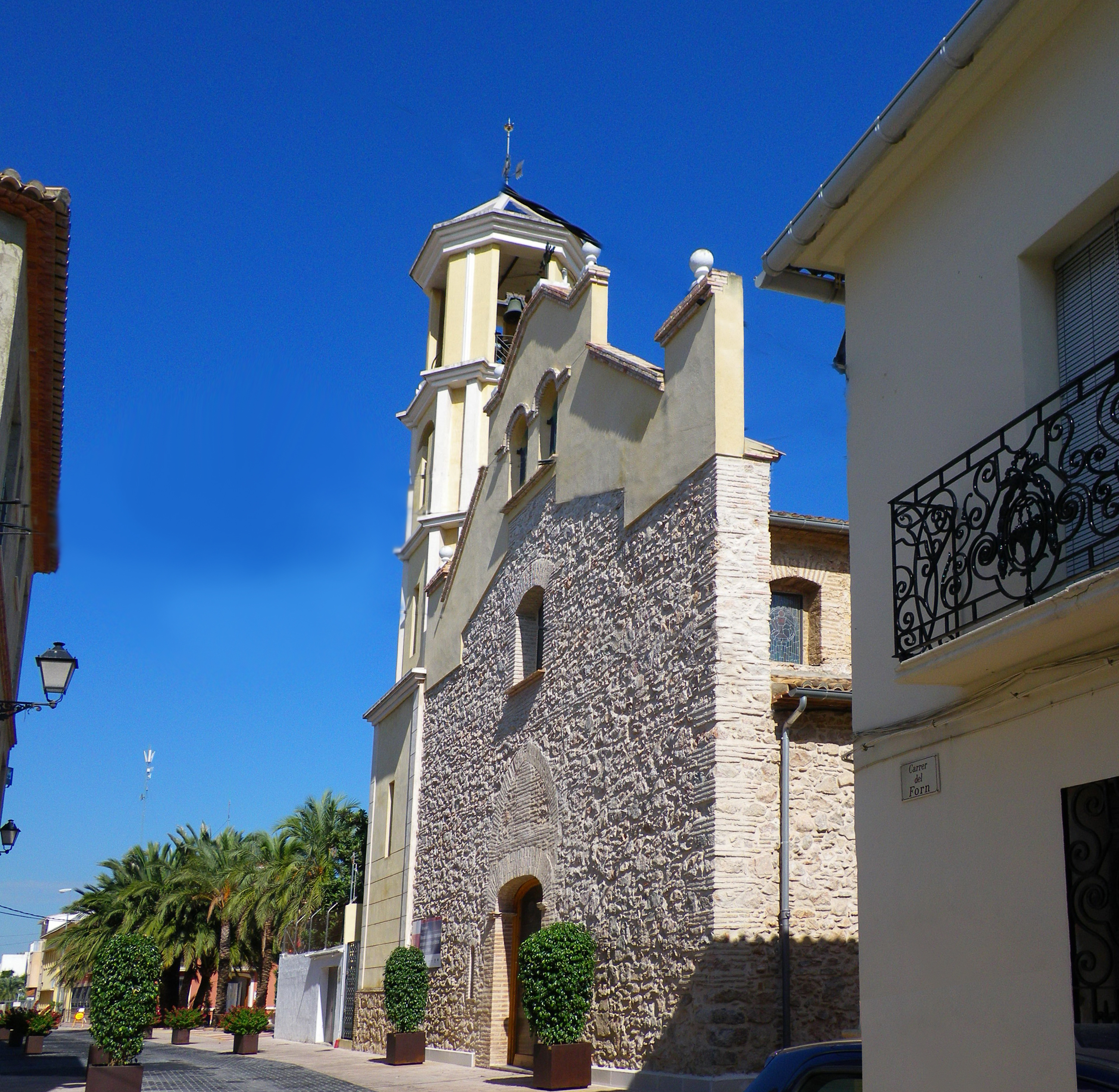

- Coat of arms

- Location in Spain
- Coordinates: 38°56′30″N 0°9′6″W
- Country: Spain
- Autonomous community: Valencian Community
- Province: Valencia
- Comarca: Safor
- Judicial district: Gandia

Government
  - Alcalde: Álvaro Catalá Muñoz (BLOC)

Area
  - Total: 1 km^{2} (0.39 sq mi)
- Elevation: 17 m (56 ft)

Population (2025-01-01)
  - Total: 1,038
  - Density: 1,000/km^{2} (2,700/sq mi)
- Demonym(s): Palmerí, palmerina
- Time zone: UTC+1 (CET)
  - Summer (DST): UTC+2 (CEST)
- Postal code: 46714
- Official language(s): Valencian
- Website: Official website

Palmera (Valencian pronunciation: [palˈmeɾa]) is a municipality in the comarca of Safor in the Valencian Community, Spain.

== See also ==
- List of municipalities in Valencia
