= Daimús =

Daimús Daimús (Valencian) Daimuz (Spanish)
- Municipality
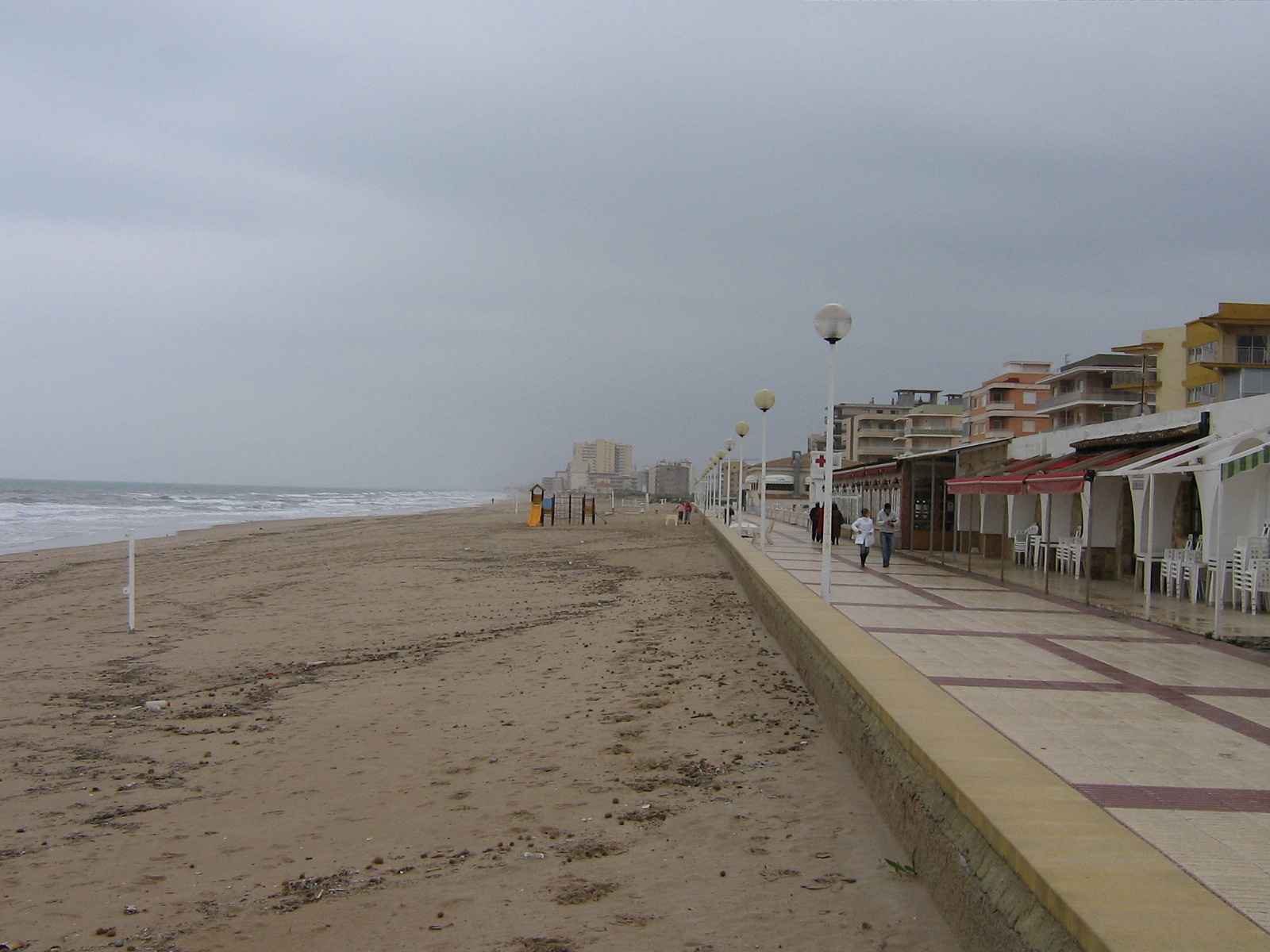
- Beach in Daimús

- Coat of arms
- Nickname: Daimús
- Location in Spain Daimús (Valencian Community) Daimús (Spain)
- Coordinates: 38°58′5″N 0°9′16″W
- Country: Spain
- Autonomous community: Valencian Community
- Province: Valencia
- Comarca: Safor
- Judicial district: Gandia
  - Alcalde: (Compromís)

Area
  - Total: 3.10 km^{2} (1.20 sq mi)
- Elevation: 6 m (20 ft)

Population (2025-01-01)
  - Total: 3,524
  - Density: 1,140/km^{2} (2,940/sq mi)
- Demonym(s): Muser, musera
- Time zone: UTC+1 (CET)
  - Summer (DST): UTC+2 (CEST)
- Postal code: 46710
- Official language(s): Valencian
- Website: www.daimus.es

Daimús (Valencian: [dajˈmus]; Spanish: Daimuz [dajˈmuθ]) is a small municipality in the Safor comarca, in the Valencian Community close to the Mediterranean Sea in Spain. It has a population of about 2,200 inhabitants in winter and around 20,000 in summer.

== Structure ==
The municipality is divided into three parts:

- El Poble (the village): the most ancient part. It is mainly composed of three-floor houses and a church.
- Els Pedregals (the stony): a group of bungalows near a small church 1 km from the main village.
- La Platja (the beach): a group of buildings only used in summer holidays by tourists, mainly from Madrid. It is 1.5 kilometer from the village.

== History ==
Daimús is a small municipality near the town of Gandia, the most important in the area. Daimús was probably founded in the 13th century, after the Reconquista. The historical importance of Gandia, particularly during the Renaissance made the rest of the small towns around it live under its shadow. As a result, Daimús' history is not well known even by its inhabitants.

The beach was unpopulated until the 1960s, when the many French tourists took advantage of the exchange rate and bought apartments by the sea. Some examples are the La Torre, Galia and Costa Blanca apartment buildings. In the late 1960s, the Spanish economy flourished (partly due to European tourism) and many Spaniards could afford a second house for the summer season. Thus, more apartment buildings appeared, such as Semiramis, Trianon, Costa Blanca II, Nayade, Finamar I, Finamar II and Pinocho.

Once it was called a family beach because it had no hotels, and because it was small. It used to have a summer cinema called Terraza Daison. In the 1970s, it had one of the earliest Pacha discothèques, since closed. In the late 1990s, Daimús started growing and doubled its size in about 6 years.

== Economy ==
For many centuries Daimús was a rural area with crops of vegetables and oranges. Later it became a tourist area due to its proximity of the sea and the fields became new buildings. Most of the population now work in the nearby cities of Oliva and Gandia.

== See also ==
- List of municipalities in Valencia
