= Piles, Spain =

Piles
- Municipality
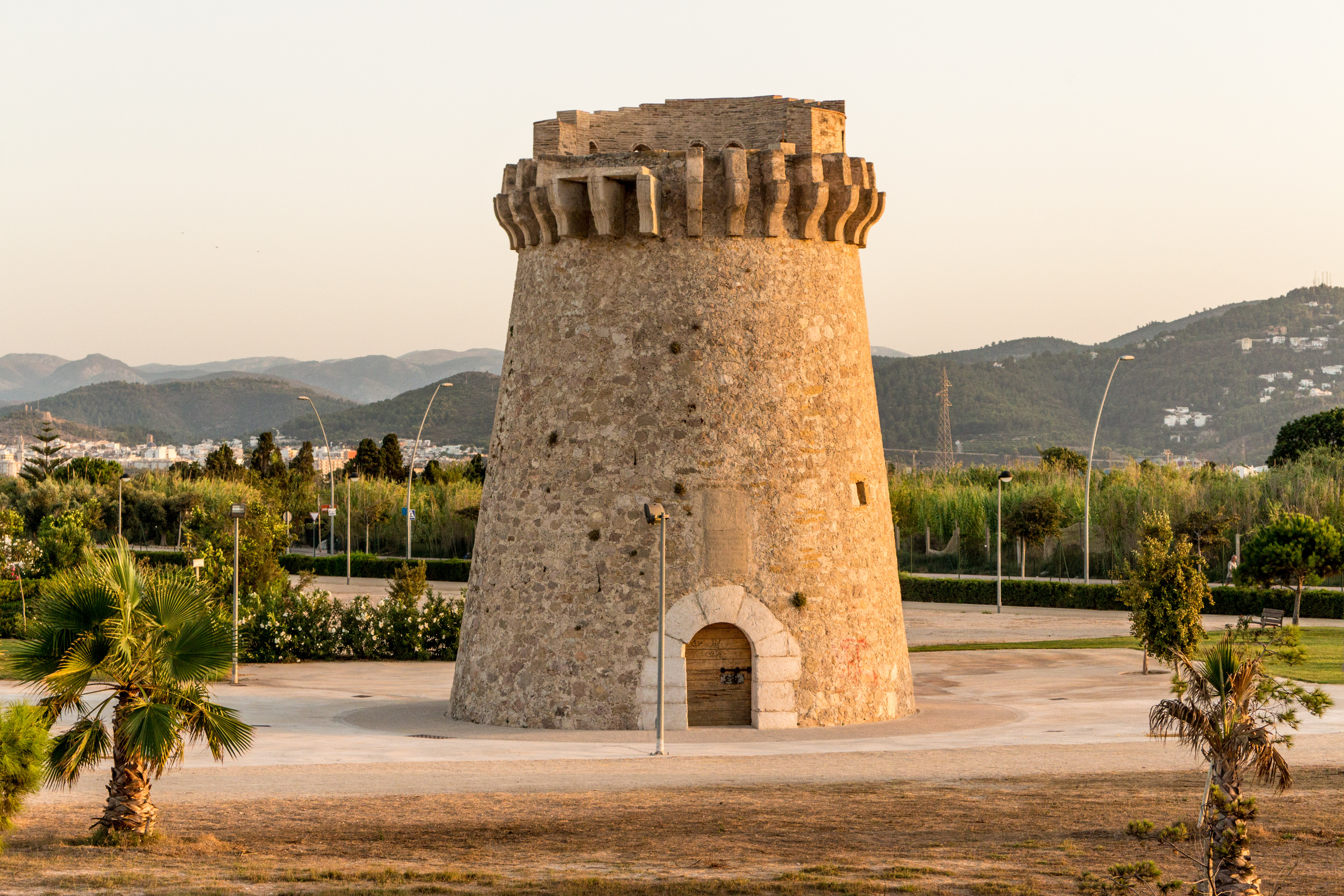

- Coat of arms

- Location in Spain
- Coordinates: 38°56′28″N 0°7′56″W
- Country: Spain
- Autonomous community: Valencian Community
- Province: Valencia
- Comarca: Safor
- Judicial district: Gandia

Government
  - Alcalde: Cristina Fornet Ausina

Area
  - Total: 3.90 km^{2} (1.51 sq mi)
- Elevation: 5 m (16 ft)

Population (2025-01-01)
  - Total: 3,151
  - Density: 808/km^{2} (2,090/sq mi)
- Demonym(s): Piler, pilera
- Time zone: UTC+1 (CET)
  - Summer (DST): UTC+2 (CEST)
- Postal code: 46712
- Official language(s): Valencian
- Website: Official website

Piles (Valencian pronunciation: [ˈpiles]) is a municipality in the comarca of Safor in the Valencian Community, Spain.

One of the watchtowers to defend Valencia against north-African forces was built in Piles 1577.

== See also ==
- List of municipalities in Valencia
