= Xeraco =

- Municipality
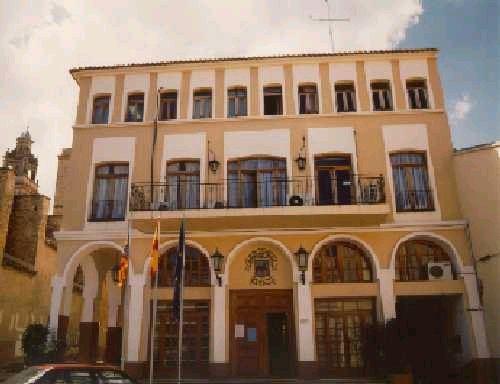

- Coat of arms

- Location in Spain Xeraco (Valencian Community) Xeraco (Spain)
- Coordinates: 39°1′55″N 0°12′56″W
- Country: Spain
- Autonomous community: Valencian Community
- Province: Valencia
- Comarca: Safor
- Judicial district: Gandia

Government
  - Alcalde: José Salvador Tejada (2018) (PSPV-PSOE)

Area
  - Total: 20.2 km^{2} (7.8 sq mi)
- Elevation: 3 m (9.8 ft)

Population (2025-01-01)
  - Total: 6,149
  - Density: 304/km^{2} (788/sq mi)
- Demonym(s): Xeraquer, xeraquera
- Time zone: UTC+1 (CET)
  - Summer (DST): UTC+2 (CEST)
- Postal code: 46770
- Official language(s): Valencian
- Website: Official website

Xeraco (Valencian: [ʃeˈɾako]; (Note: Often pronounced [ajʃeˈɾako].) Spanish: Jaraco [xaˈɾako]) is a municipality in the comarca of Safor in Valencia, Spain. Like many coastal towns it is divided into the original village of Xeraco and the new beach resort, Xeraco Platja. Xeraco is separated from the neighbouring beach resorts of Gandia and Tavernes by the Riu Vaca and swamp land containing native population of birds. It is an essentially agricultural village.

== Geography ==
Xeraco is 57 km to the south from Valencia city (39° 01' 55" N 0° 12' 56" W). There is about 3 km between the village and the beach known as Xeraco Platja.

Road: N-332.

Highway: AP-7 exit, shared with Xeresa

Railway station: C-1 Line, from Valencia (Renfe).

== Demographics ==
Demographic Change
2000	2002	2004	2006	2008	2010	2017
4.982	5.145	5.443	5.671	6.259	6.129	5.715

== Twin town ==
- Bruguières, France

== See also ==
- List of municipalities in Valencia
