= Miramar, Spain =

Miramar
- Municipality
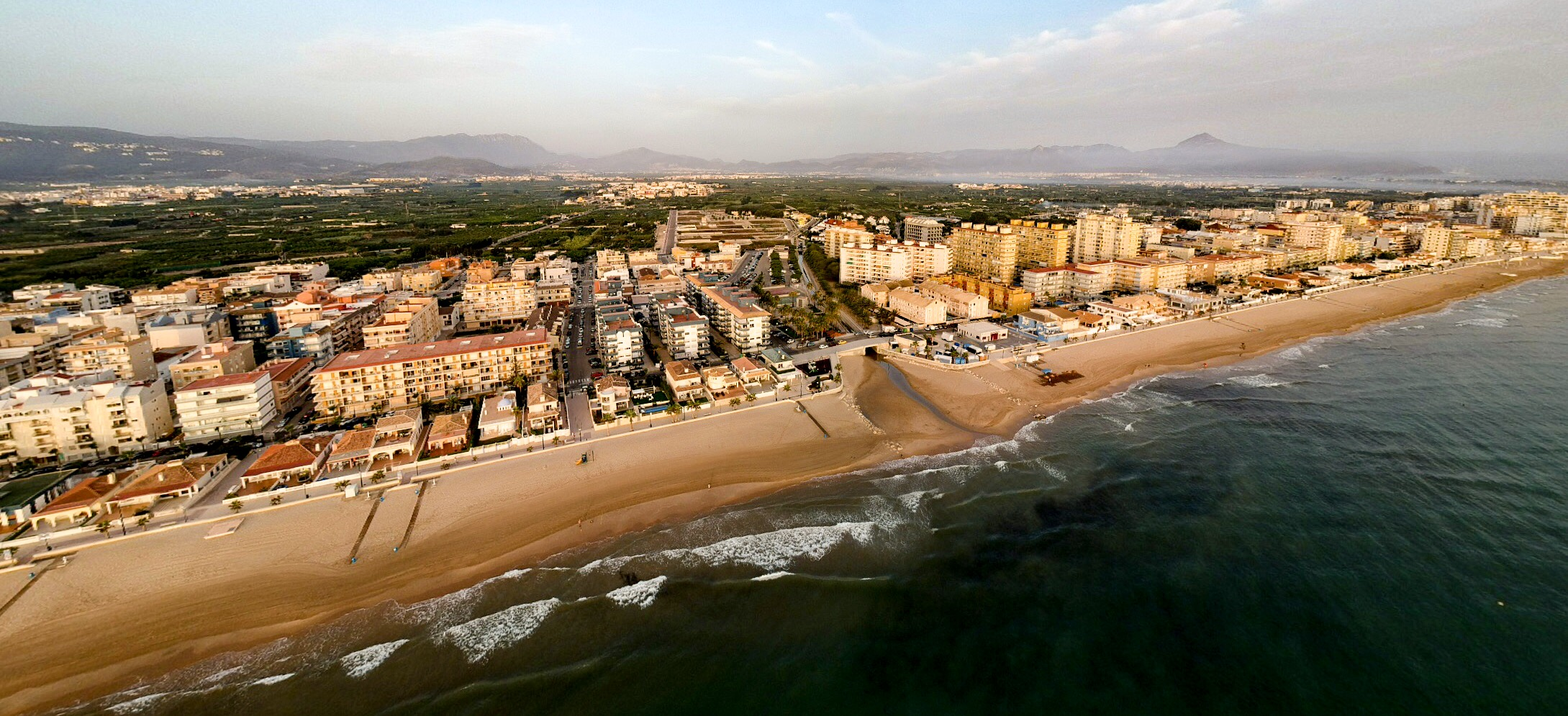
- Beach and town of Miramar

- Flag Coat of arms

- Location in Spain
- Coordinates: 38°57′0″N 0°8′20″W
- Country: Spain
- Autonomous community: Valencian Community
- Province: Valencia
- Comarca: Safor
- Judicial district: Gandia

Government
  - Alcalde: Asensio Llorca Bertó

Area
  - Total: 2.60 km^{2} (1.00 sq mi)
- Elevation: 12 m (39 ft)

Population (2025-01-01)
  - Total: 3,143
  - Density: 1,210/km^{2} (3,130/sq mi)
- Demonym(s): Miramarí, miramarina
- Time zone: UTC+1 (CET)
  - Summer (DST): UTC+2 (CEST)
- Postal code: 46711
- Official language(s): Valencian
- Website: Official website

Miramar (Valencian pronunciation: [miɾaˈmaɾ]) is a municipality in the comarca of Safor in the Valencian Community, Spain.

== See also ==
- List of municipalities in Valencia
