= Llocnou de Sant Jeroni =

- Municipality
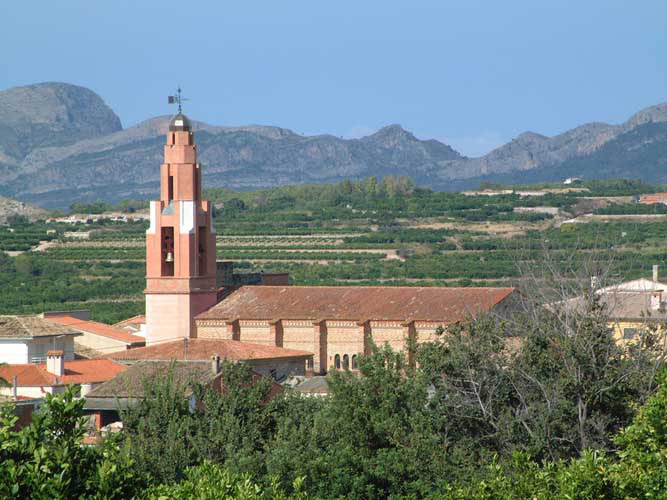

- Flag Coat of arms

- Location in Spain
- Coordinates: 38°54′50″N 0°17′9″W
- Country: Spain
- Autonomous community: Valencian Community
- Province: Valencia
- Comarca: Safor
- Judicial district: Gandia

Government
  - Alcalde: Ricard Igualde Garcia

Area
  - Total: 6.5 km^{2} (2.5 sq mi)
- Elevation: 98 m (322 ft)

Population (2025-01-01)
  - Total: 594
  - Density: 91/km^{2} (240/sq mi)
- Demonym(s): Llocnouí, llocnouïna
- Time zone: UTC+1 (CET)
  - Summer (DST): UTC+2 (CEST)
- Postal code: 46726
- Official language(s): Valencian
- Website: Official website

Llocnou de Sant Jeroni (Valencian pronunciation: [ˌʎɔɡˈnɔw ðe ˈsaɲ dʒeˈɾɔni]) is a municipality in the comarca of Safor in the Valencian Community, Spain.

== See also ==
- List of municipalities in Valencia
