= Rafelcofer =

Municipality of Spain

Coordinates: 38°56′05″N 0°10′04″W

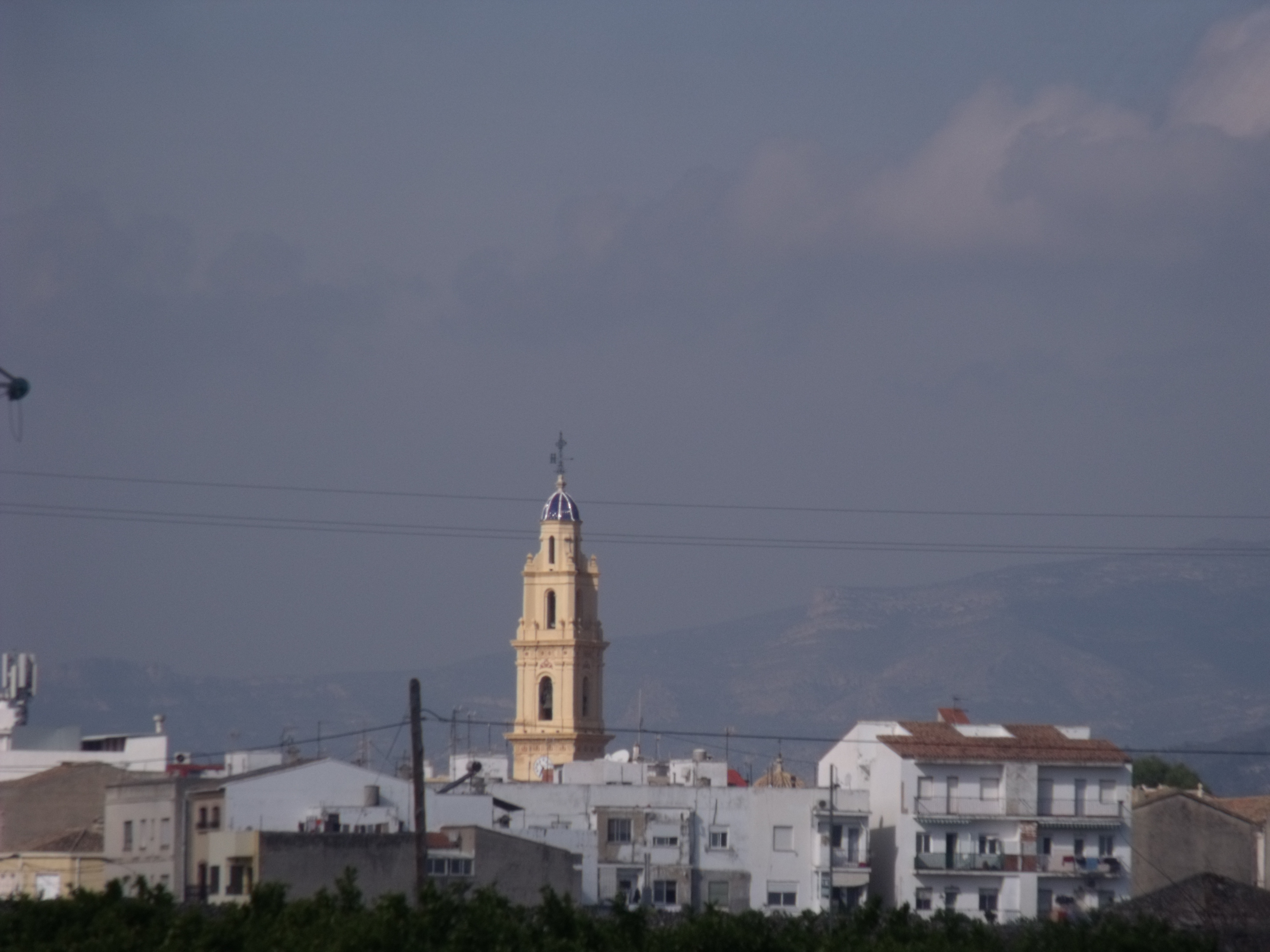
General view of Rafelcofer

Rafelcofer is a municipality in the Valencian Community of Spain, situated within the province of Valencia in the Safor comarca. The town is located approximately 74 kilometers south of Valencia city and about 6 kilometers from the Mediterranean coast. The terrain is predominantly flat, with a slight elevation toward the south.

The town's history includes evidence of ancient settlements, including the village of Rabat. Artifacts from the Iberian, Roman, Arab, and Christian periods have been discovered.

Rafelcofer offers various cultural and natural attractions, including a local museum, El Rabat, and the Mountain of Sant Miquel, as well as various dykes and mills, some dating back to 1849 with Islamic origins.

The town celebrates several festivals, including San Diego on the third weekend of August and a Cultural Week in the first week of July, leading up to the patron saint festivities in the second week of July. These events often feature moros y cristianos parades.

Rafelcofer has a population of approximately 1,400 inhabitants.

== See also ==
- List of municipalities in Valencia
