= Castellonet de la Conquesta =

- Municipality
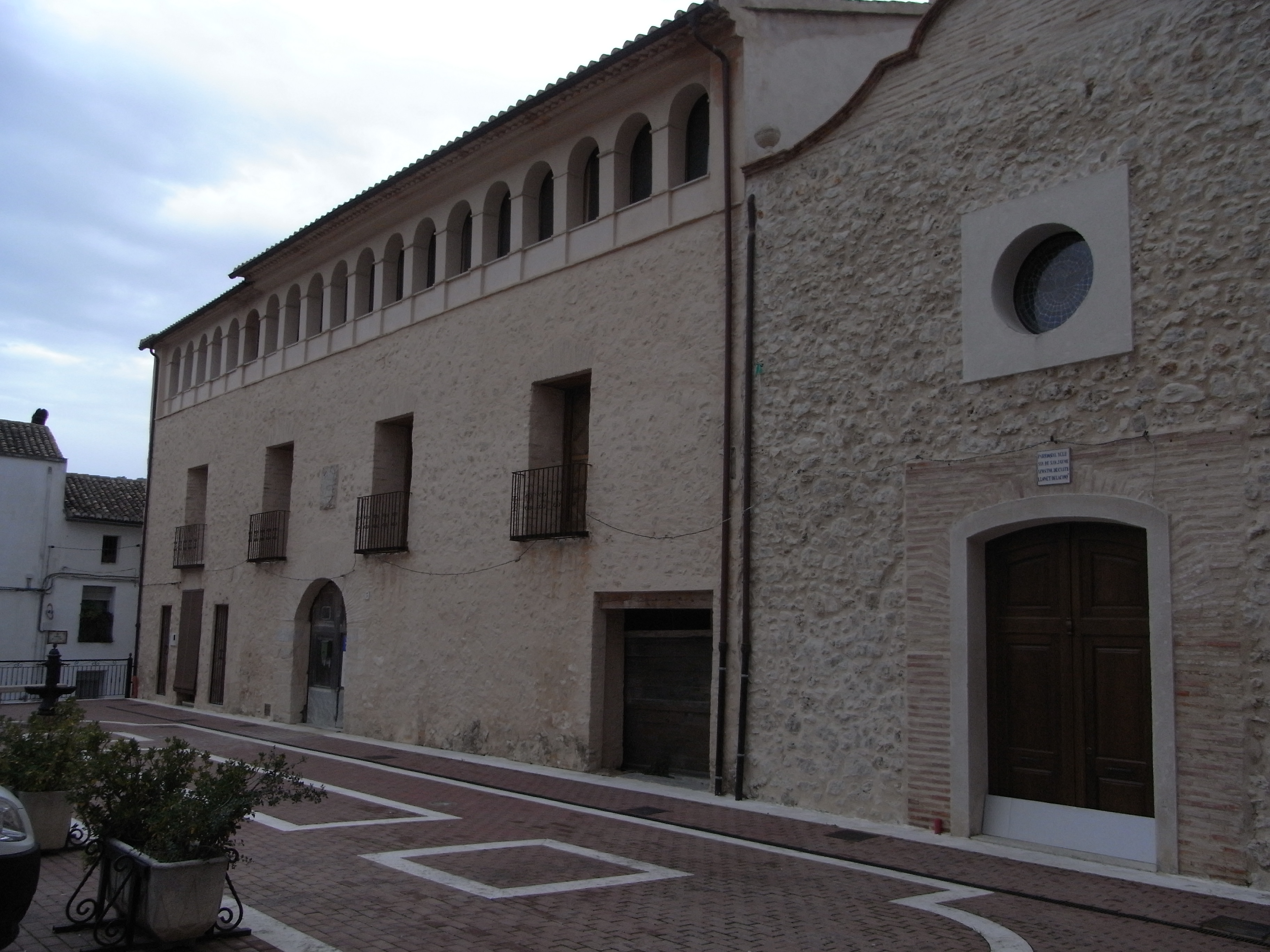

- Coat of arms

- Location in Spain Castellonet de la Conquesta (Valencian Community) Castellonet de la Conquesta (Spain)
- Coordinates: 38°54′50″N 0°15′51″W
- Country: Spain
- Autonomous community: Valencian Community
- Province: Valencia
- Comarca: Safor
- Judicial district: Gandia

Government
  - Alcalde: Juan Espinosa Teruel

Area
  - Total: 5.43 km^{2} (2.10 sq mi)
- Elevation: 175 m (574 ft)

Population (2025-01-01)
  - Total: 159
  - Density: 29.3/km^{2} (75.8/sq mi)
- Demonym(s): Castellonetí, castellonetina
- Time zone: UTC+1 (CET)
  - Summer (DST): UTC+2 (CEST)
- Postal code: 46726
- Official language(s): Valencian
- Website: Official website

Castellonet de la Conquesta (Valencian pronunciation: [kasteʎoˈned de la koŋˈkesta]) (Spanish: Castellonet) is a municipality in the comarca of Safor in the Valencian Community, Spain.

== See also ==
- List of municipalities in Valencia
