= Benifairó de la Valldigna =

Municipality in Valencia, Spain

- Municipality
- Coat of arms

- Location in Spain Benifairó de la Valldigna (Valencian Community) Benifairó de la Valldigna (Spain)
- Coordinates: 39°03′16″N 0°18′11″W
- Country: Spain
- Autonomous community: Valencian Community
- Province: Valencia
- Comarca: Safor
- Judicial district: Sueca

Government
  - Alcalde: Josep Antoni Alberola (Coalició Compromís)

Area
  - Total: 20.2 km^{2} (7.8 sq mi)
- Elevation: 40 m (130 ft)

Population (2025-01-01)
  - Total: 1,588
  - Density: 78.6/km^{2} (204/sq mi)
- Demonym: Benifairoñero/a
- Time zone: UTC+1 (CET)
  - Summer (DST): UTC+2 (CEST)
- Postal code: 46791
- Official language(s): Valencian
- Website: Official website

Benifairó de la Valldigna (Valencian: [benifajˈɾo ðe la vaʎˈdiŋna]; Spanish: [benifajˈɾo ðe la valˈdiɣna]) is a municipality in the comarca of Safor in the Valencian Community, Spain.

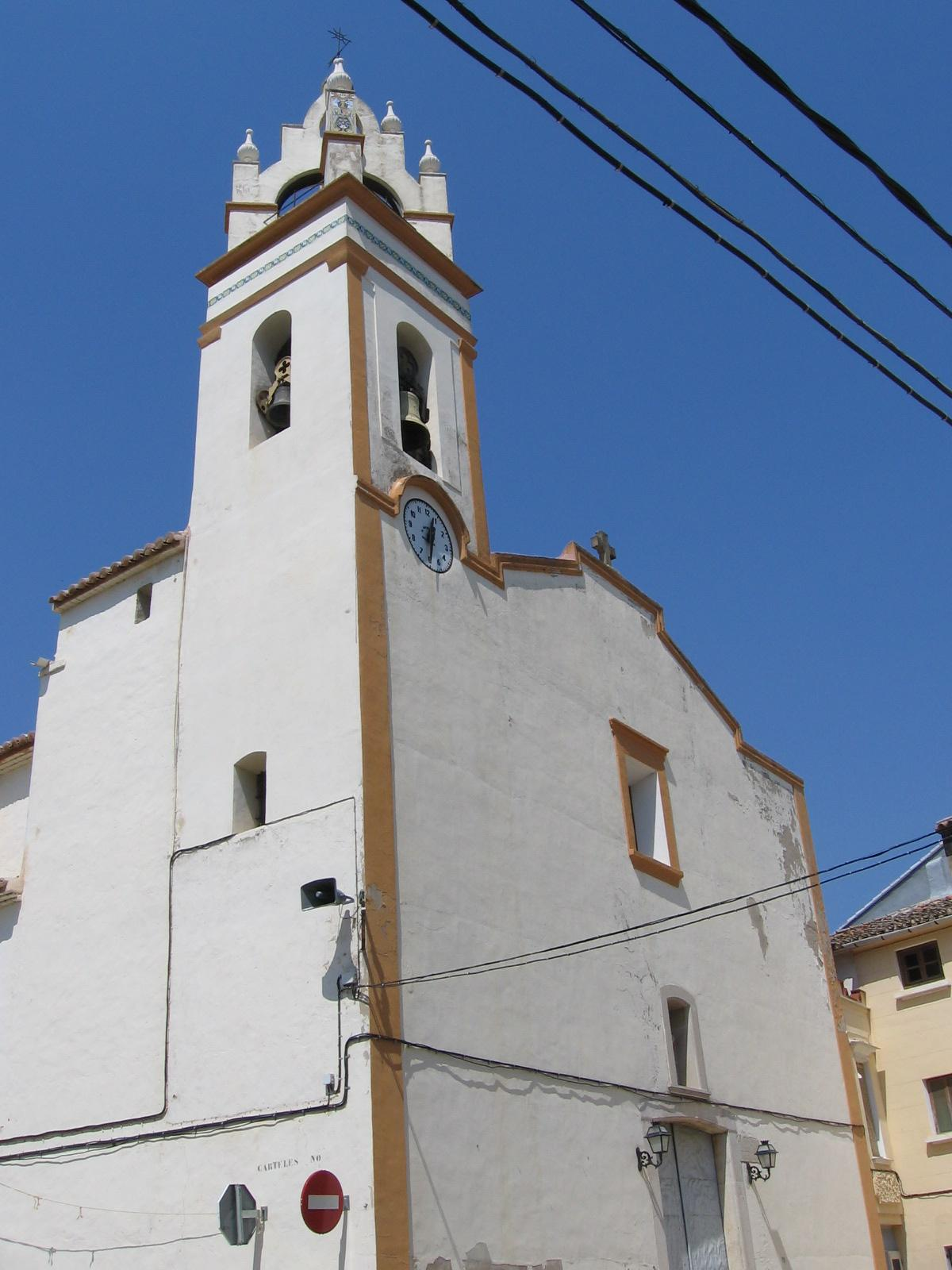
The church of St John the Evangelist

== See also ==
- List of municipalities in Valencia
