= Ròtova =

- Municipality
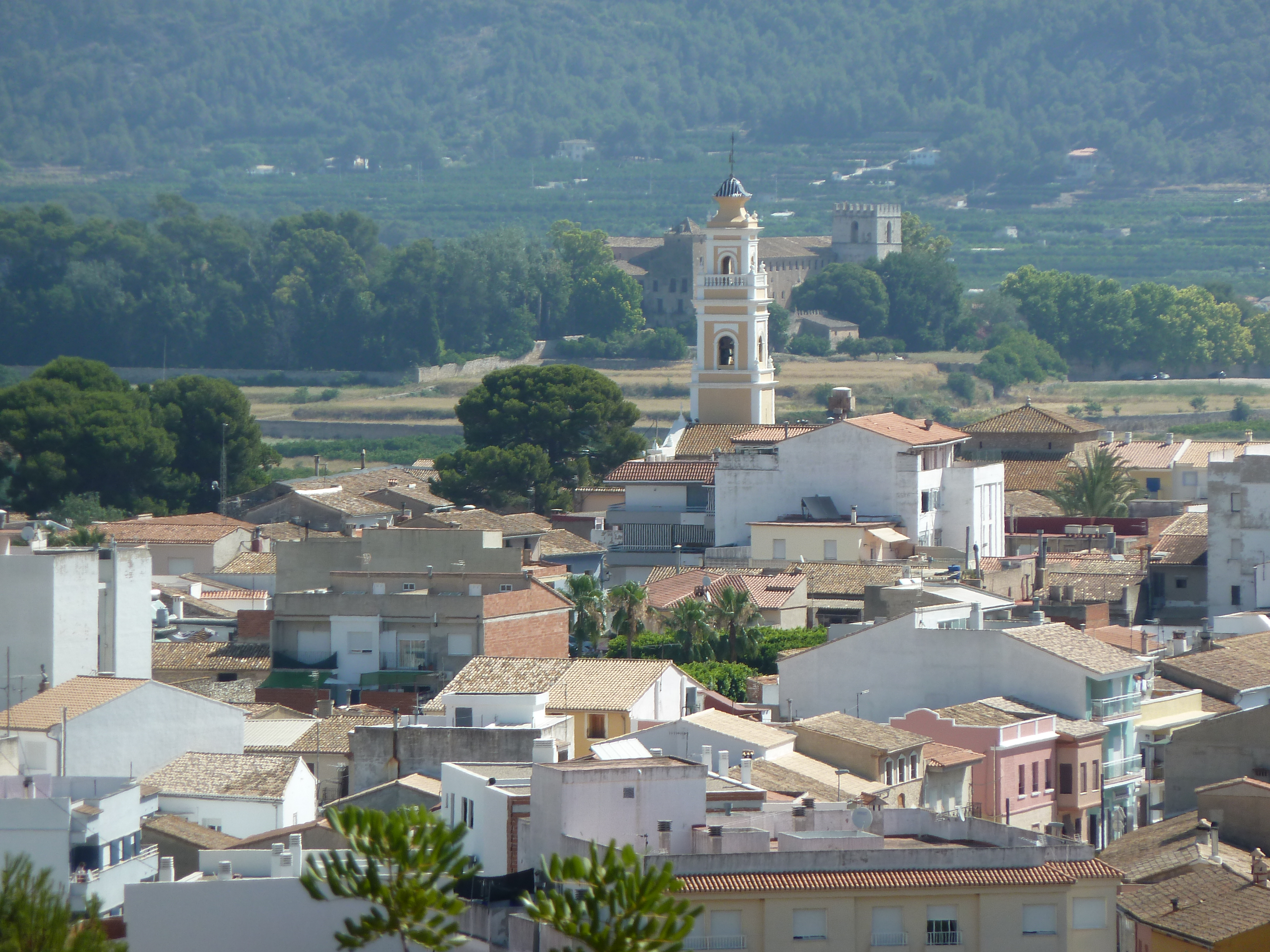

- Flag Coat of arms

- Location in Spain
- Coordinates: 38°56′0″N 0°15′31″W
- Country: Spain
- Autonomous community: Valencian Community
- Province: Valencia
- Comarca: Safor
- Judicial district: Gandia

Government
  - Alcalde: Antonio García Serra

Area
  - Total: 7.5 km^{2} (2.9 sq mi)
- Elevation: 74 m (243 ft)

Population (2025-01-01)
  - Total: 1,283
  - Density: 170/km^{2} (440/sq mi)
- Demonym(s): Rotoví, rotovina
- Time zone: UTC+1 (CET)
  - Summer (DST): UTC+2 (CEST)
- Postal code: 46725
- Official language(s): Valencian
- Website: Official website

Ròtova (Valencian pronunciation: [ˈrɔtova]; Spanish: Rótova [ˈrotoβa]) is a municipality in the comarca of Safor in the Valencian Community, Spain.

== Main sights ==
- Church of Sant Bartomeu Apòstol.
- Palace of the Counts of Ròtova.
- Monastery of Sant Jeroni de Cotalba, constructed between the 14th and 18th centuries.

== See also ==
- List of municipalities in Valencia
