= Almoines =

- Municipality
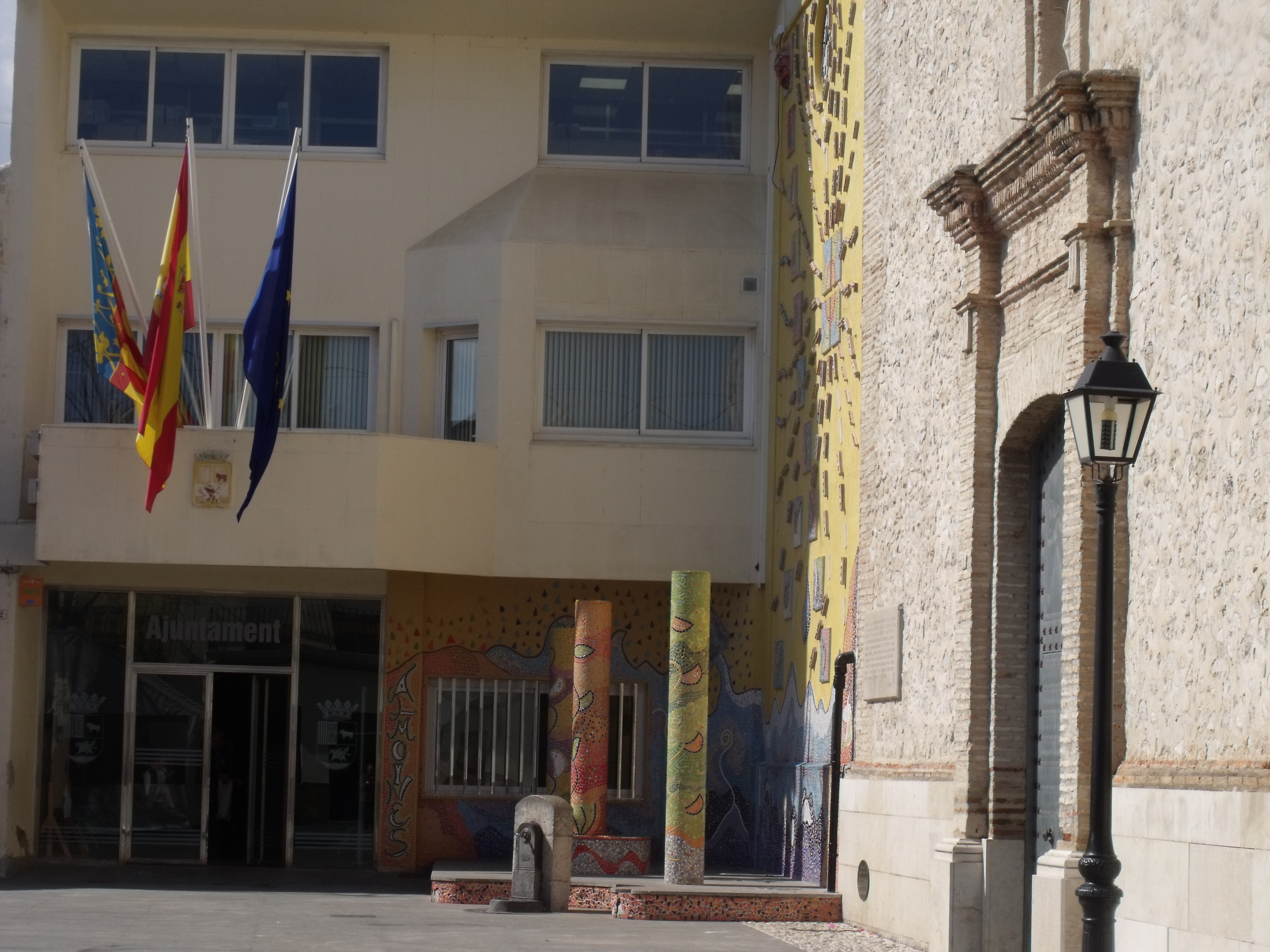
- Town hall

- Coat of arms

- Location in Spain
- Coordinates: 38°56′36″N 0°10′56″W
- Country: Spain
- Autonomous community: Valencian Community
- Province: Valencia
- Comarca: Safor
- Judicial district: Gandia

Government
  - Alcalde: Vicent Ribes Albert (BLOC)

Area
  - Total: 2.1 km^{2} (0.81 sq mi)
- Elevation: 34 m (112 ft)

Population (2025-01-01)
  - Total: 2,664
  - Density: 1,300/km^{2} (3,300/sq mi)
- Demonyms: Almoiner, almoinera
- Time zone: UTC+1 (CET)
  - Summer (DST): UTC+2 (CEST)
- Postal code: 46723
- Official language(s): Valencian
- Website: Official website

Almoines (Valencian: [alˈmɔjnes]; Spanish: [alˈmojnes]) is a municipality in the comarca of Safor in the Valencian Community, Spain.

== See also ==
- List of municipalities in Valencia
