= El Real de Gandia =

- Municipality
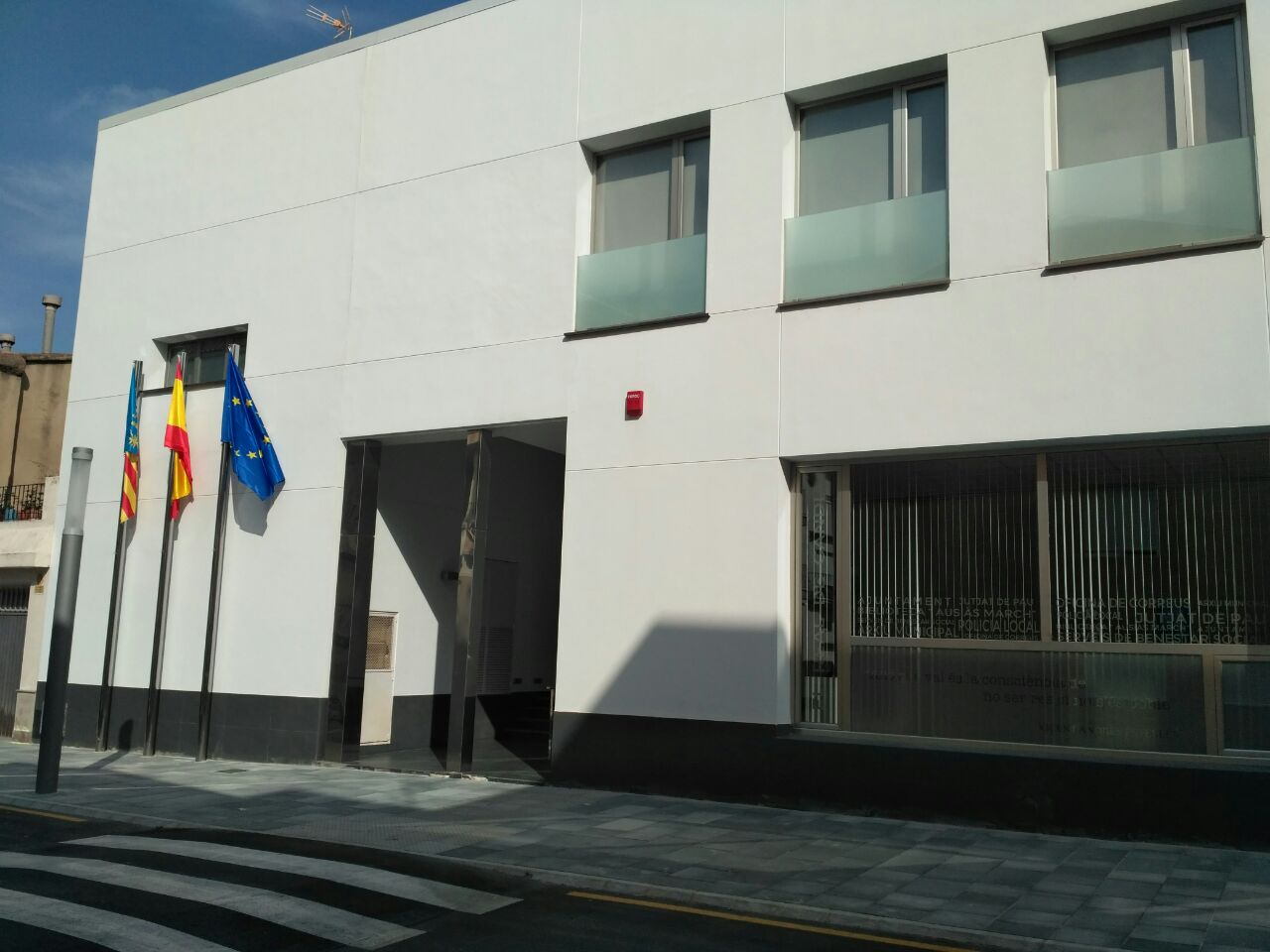
- Town hall

- Coat of arms

- Location in La Safor, Spain
- Coordinates: 38°56′50″N 0°11′26″W
- Country: Spain
- Autonomous community: Valencian Community
- Province: Valencia
- Comarca: Safor
- Judicial district: Gandia

Government
  - Alcalde: Gustavo Mascarell Tarrazona (PSOE)

Area
  - Total: 6.1 km^{2} (2.4 sq mi)
- Elevation: 21 m (69 ft)

Population (2025-01-01)
  - Total: 2,722
  - Density: 450/km^{2} (1,200/sq mi)
- Demonym(s): Realer, realera
- Time zone: UTC+1 (CET)
  - Summer (DST): UTC+2 (CEST)
- Postal code: 46727
- Official language(s): Valencian
- Website: Official website

El Real de Gandia (Valencian pronunciation: [el reˈal de ɣanˈdi.a], Spanish: Real de Gandía) is a municipality in the comarca of Safor in the Valencian Community, Spain.

== Transport ==
The only way to arrive Real de Gandía is with line 1 of La Marina Gandiense, which connects the village with the nearby Gandía and its university.

== See also ==
- List of municipalities in Valencia
