= Ador, Spain =

Ador
- Municipality
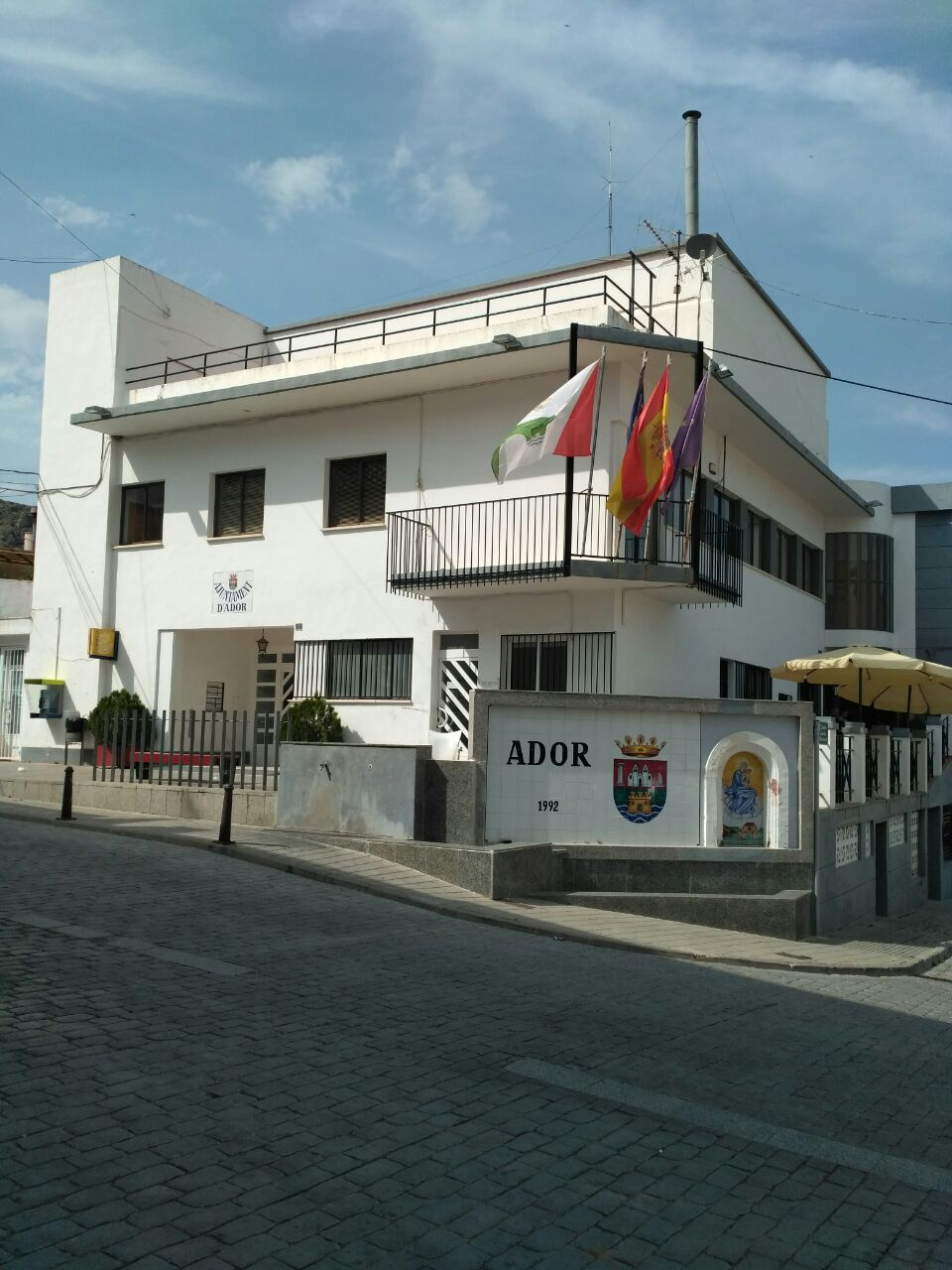
- Town hall

- Flag Coat of arms

- Location in Spain
- Coordinates: 38°55′5″N 0°13′31″W
- Country: Spain
- Autonomous community: Valencian Community
- Province: Valencia
- Comarca: Safor
- Judicial district: Gandia

Government
  - Alcalde: Juan Vicente Estruch Estruch

Area
  - Total: 13.80 km^{2} (5.33 sq mi)
- Elevation: 50 m (160 ft)

Population (2025-01-01)
  - Total: 1,755
  - Density: 127.2/km^{2} (329.4/sq mi)
- Demonyms: Adorer, adorera
- Time zone: UTC+1 (CET)
  - Summer (DST): UTC+2 (CEST)
- Postal code: 46729
- Official language(s): Valencian
- Website: Official website

Ador (Valencian: [aˈðoɾ]; Spanish: [aˈðoɾ]) is a municipality in the comarca of Safor in the Valencian Community, Spain. It has a population of 1,755 (INE 2025).

== See also ==
- List of municipalities in Valencia
