= Potríes =

Potries
- Municipality
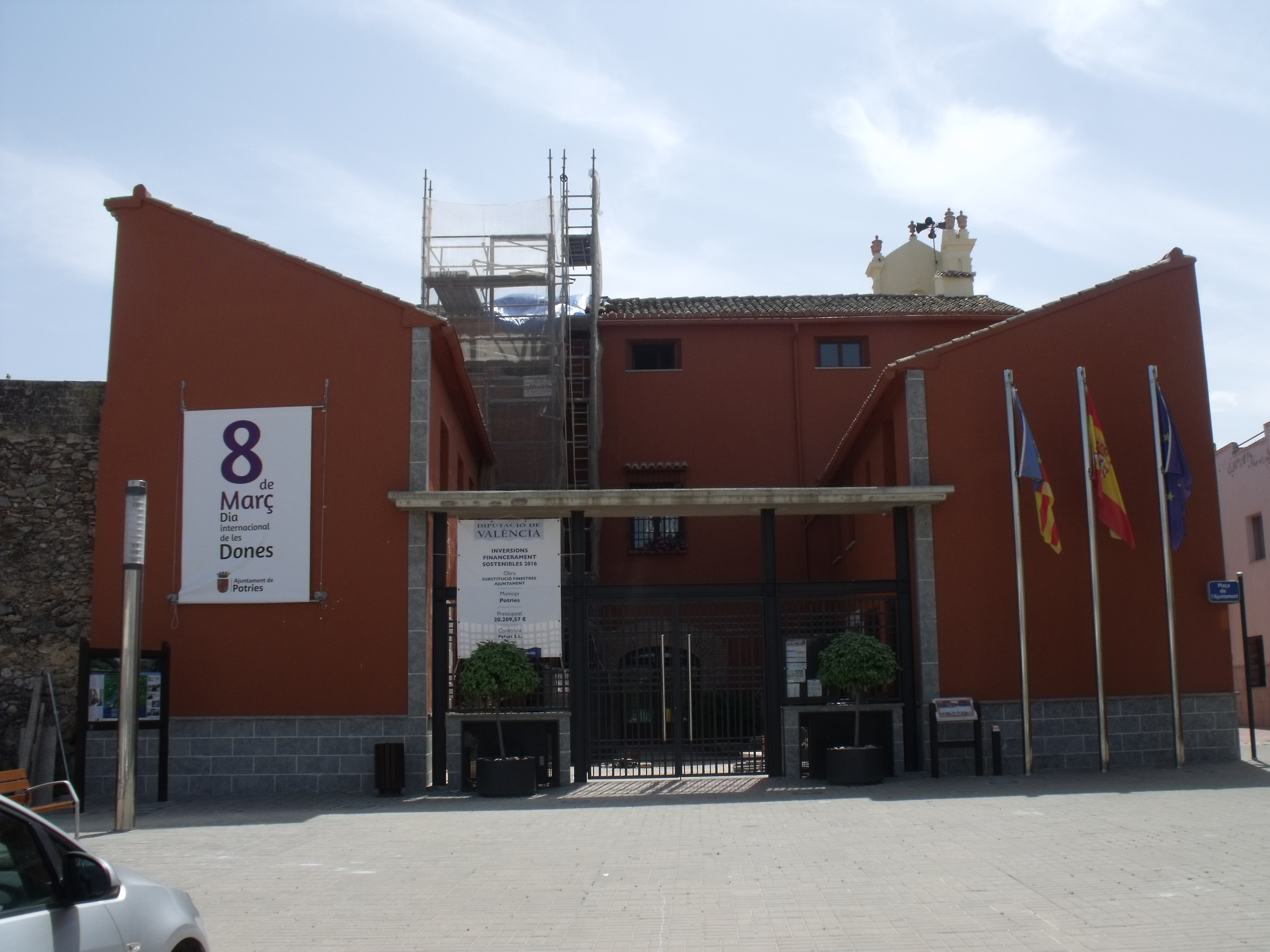
- Town hall

- Coat of arms

- Location in Spain
- Coordinates: 38°54′55″N 0°12′16″W
- Country: Spain
- Autonomous community: Valencian Community
- Province: Valencia
- Comarca: Safor
- Judicial district: Gandia

Government
  - Alcalde: Juan Fernando Monzó Peiró (BLOC)

Area
  - Total: 3.07 km^{2} (1.19 sq mi)
- Elevation: 12 m (39 ft)

Population (2025-01-01)
  - Total: 1,135
  - Density: 370/km^{2} (958/sq mi)
- Demonym(s): Potrier, potriera
- Time zone: UTC+1 (CET)
  - Summer (DST): UTC+2 (CEST)
- Postal code: 46721
- Official language(s): Valencian
- Website: Official website

Potries (Valencian pronunciation: [poˈtɾi.es]) is a municipality in the comarca of Safor in the Valencian Community, Spain.

== See also ==
- List of municipalities in Valencia
