= Xeresa =

- Municipality
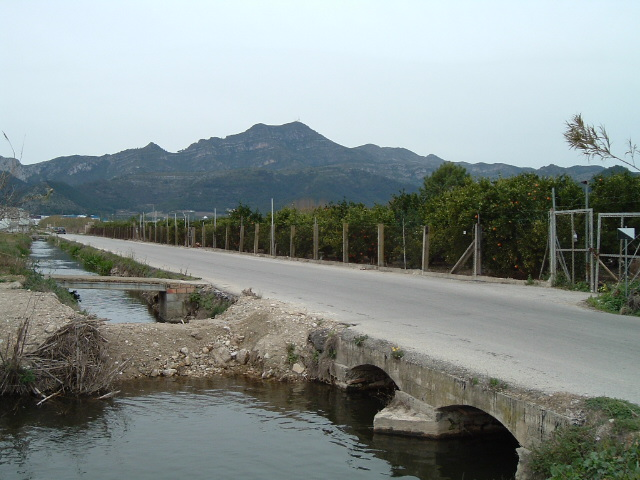

- Coat of arms

- Location in Spain Xeresa (Valencian Community) Xeresa (Spain)
- Coordinates: 39°0′35″N 0°13′6″W
- Country: Spain
- Autonomous community: Valencian Community
- Province: Valencia
- Comarca: Safor
- Judicial district: Gandia

Government
  - Alcalde: Tomàs Ferrandis i Moscardó (Coalició Compromís)

Area
  - Total: 16.9 km^{2} (6.5 sq mi)
- Elevation: 30 m (98 ft)

Population (2025-01-01)
  - Total: 2,418
  - Density: 143/km^{2} (371/sq mi)
- Demonym(s): Xeresà, xeresana
- Time zone: UTC+1 (CET)
  - Summer (DST): UTC+2 (CEST)
- Postal code: 46790
- Official language(s): Valencian
- Website: Official website

Xeresa (Valencian: [ʃeˈɾeza]; (Note: Often pronounced [ajʃeˈɾeza].) Spanish: Jeresa [xeˈɾesa]) is a municipality in the comarca of Safor in the Valencian Community, Spain. It is located 55 kilometers at the south of Valencia and 110 kilometers north from Alicante and can be accessed through road N-332. Xeresa is an essentially agricultural village.

== See also ==
- List of municipalities in Valencia
