= Beniarjó =

- Municipality
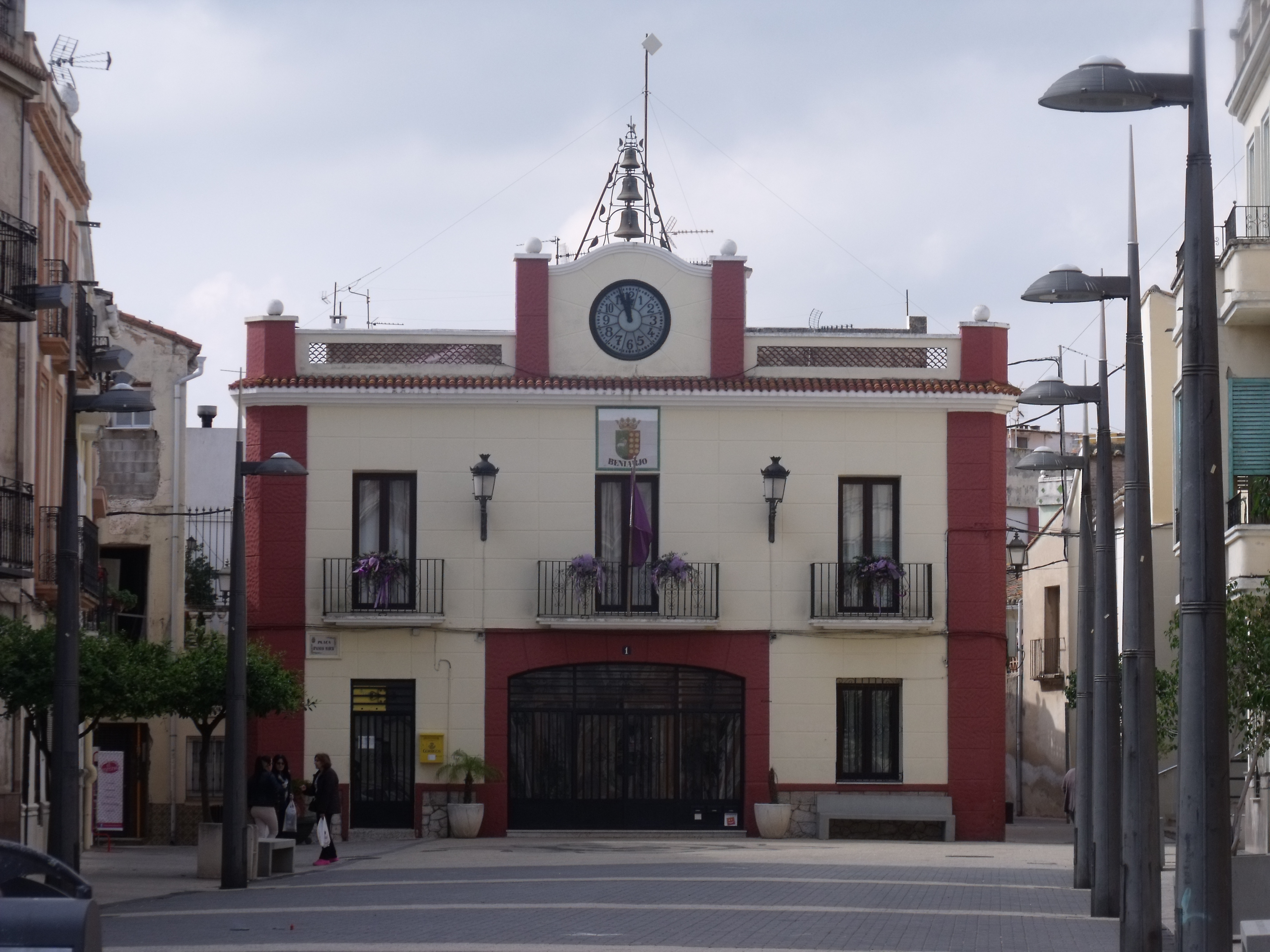
- Town hall

- Coat of arms

- Location in Spain
- Coordinates: 38°55′58″N 0°11′16″W
- Country: Spain
- Autonomous community: Valencian Community
- Province: Valencia
- Comarca: Safor
- Judicial district: Gandia

Government
  - Alcalde: Salvador Manuel Enguix Morant

Area
  - Total: 2.8 km^{2} (1.1 sq mi)
- Elevation: 48 m (157 ft)

Population (2025-01-01)
  - Total: 1,964
  - Density: 700/km^{2} (1,800/sq mi)
- Demonym(s): Beniarjoter, beniarjotera
- Time zone: UTC+1 (CET)
  - Summer (DST): UTC+2 (CEST)
- Postal code: 46722
- Official language(s): Valencian
- Website: Official website

Beniarjó (Valencian: [beniaɾˈdʒo]; Spanish: [benjaɾˈxo]) is a municipality in the comarca of Safor in the Valencian Community, Spain.

== Notable people ==
- Ausiàs March (1400 – March 3, 1459), a medieval Valencian poet and knight from Gandia

== See also ==
- List of municipalities in Valencia
