= Convent of Santa Clara of Gandia =

Convent in Valencia, Spain

Coordinates: 38°58′2.84″N 0°10′40.48″W

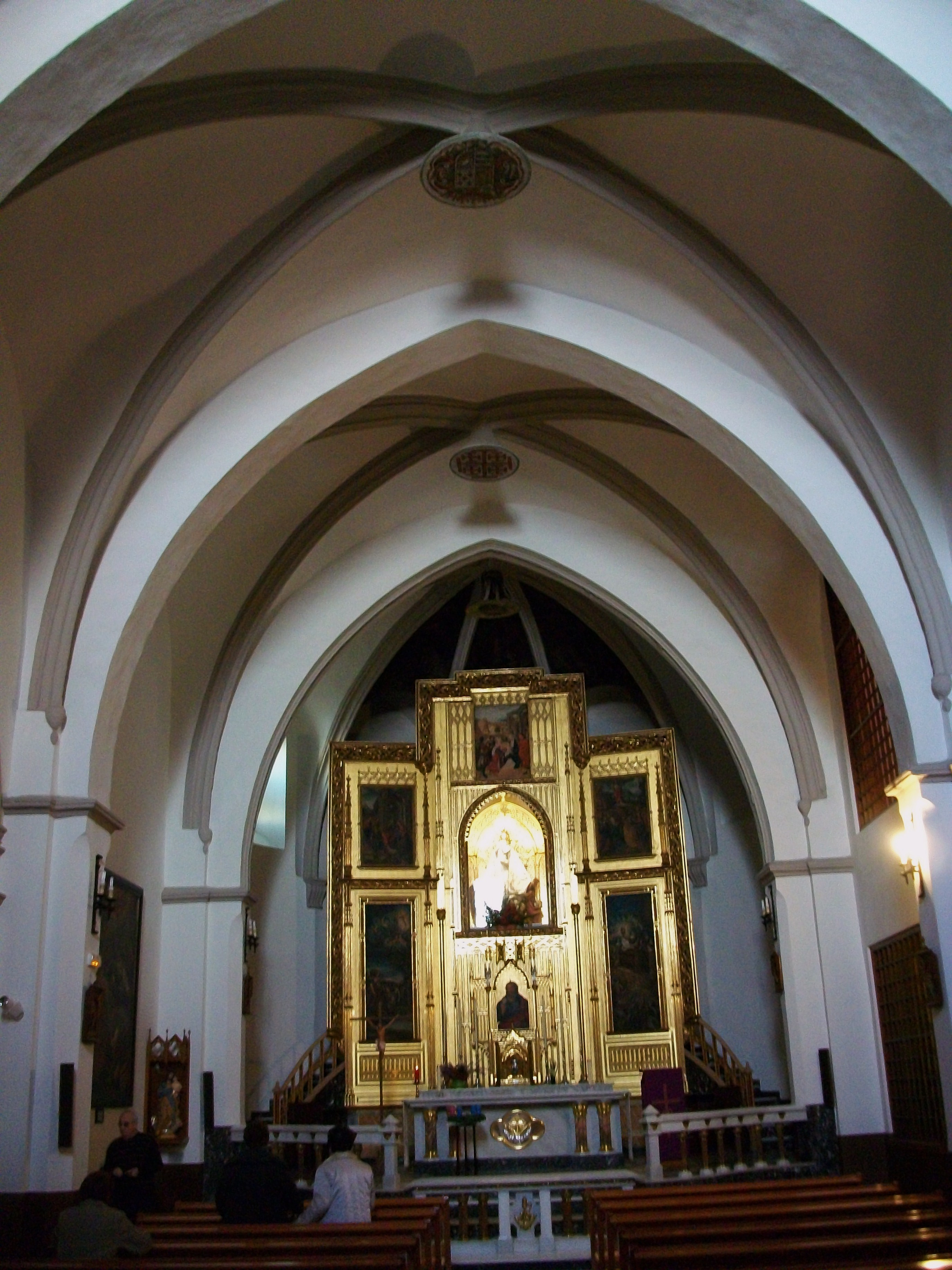
- Church of the Convent of Santa Clara of Gandia

- Location within Spain
- Interactive map of Convent of Santa Clara of Gandia

Monastery information
- Full name: Convent of Santa Clara of Gandia
- Other name: Convent de Santa Clara de Gandia
- Order: Colettine Poor Clares
- Established: 1431
- Diocese: Valencia

People
- Founder: Violante of Aragon
- Important associated figures: House of Borgia, Duke of Gandia

Site
- Location: Gandia, (Valencian Community), Spain
- Public access: Yes

The Convent of Santa Clara is 15th-century, Roman Catholic convent belonging to cloistered order of the Colettine Poor Clares, and located in the town of Gandia, province of Valencia, Spain. It is located in the centre of Gandia and at few meters from the Collegiate Basilica of Gandia, in María Enríquez de Luna square.

== History ==
The Convent of Santa Clara was founded in 1431 by Violante of Aragon, daughter of Alfonso of Aragon and Foix, Royal Duke of Gandía. It is a clear demonstration of the historical and artistic significance of the city. The Gothic-style church houses an altarpiece by Paolo da San Leocadio. There were many women of the Borgia family who spent his life in this convent.

After the death of its founder, Violante of Aragon, spend a few years in which the convent is practically uninhabited. Later, the valencian noble Luis Vich y de Corbera will be who decided to restore this convent. The convent was the new home for ten nuns from the same community who abandoned her French convent of the city of Lézignan-Corbières. Among these nuns was also María Escarlata, the sister of the French Prince. She took refuge in the convent of Gandia fleeing of being married by force.

María Enríquez de Luna, Duchess of Gandia entered the convent with the name of Sister Gabriela. She became Abbess of the convent in 1530, and died nine years later. Later, would be his daughter, Sister Francisca de Jesús which was chosen abbess of the convent in 1533, and ruled it until in 1548, he resigned to foundations away from their family environment. He had the satisfaction of seeing religious of his convent of Gandia to his own mother, Sister María Gabriela and five nieces, daughters of his brother Juan de Borja y Enríquez de Luna, sisters of Saint Francis Borgia.

In the courtyard of the convent is an olive tree which according to tradition was planted by Saint Francis Borgia. The convent has the image of the Virgin of Baluarte, the Virgin of the Bastion.

== Art collection ==
The convent preserves an outstanding art collection bequeathed by the Borgias including the works of José de Ribera, Juan de Juanes, Paolo da San Leocadio, Francisco Salzillo or Francisco Ribalta school painters. In 2010 the convent signed a collaboration agreement which yields works to the Town Hall of Gandia that are a part of the future Museum of the Poor Clares, at the old Sant Marc Hospital.

== Visits ==
It is a cloistered convent, so it is only possible to visit the church of Valencian Gothic style which is located on the right side of the construction.

== See also ==
- Route of the Borgias
- Route of the Valencian classics
