= Route of the Valencian classics =

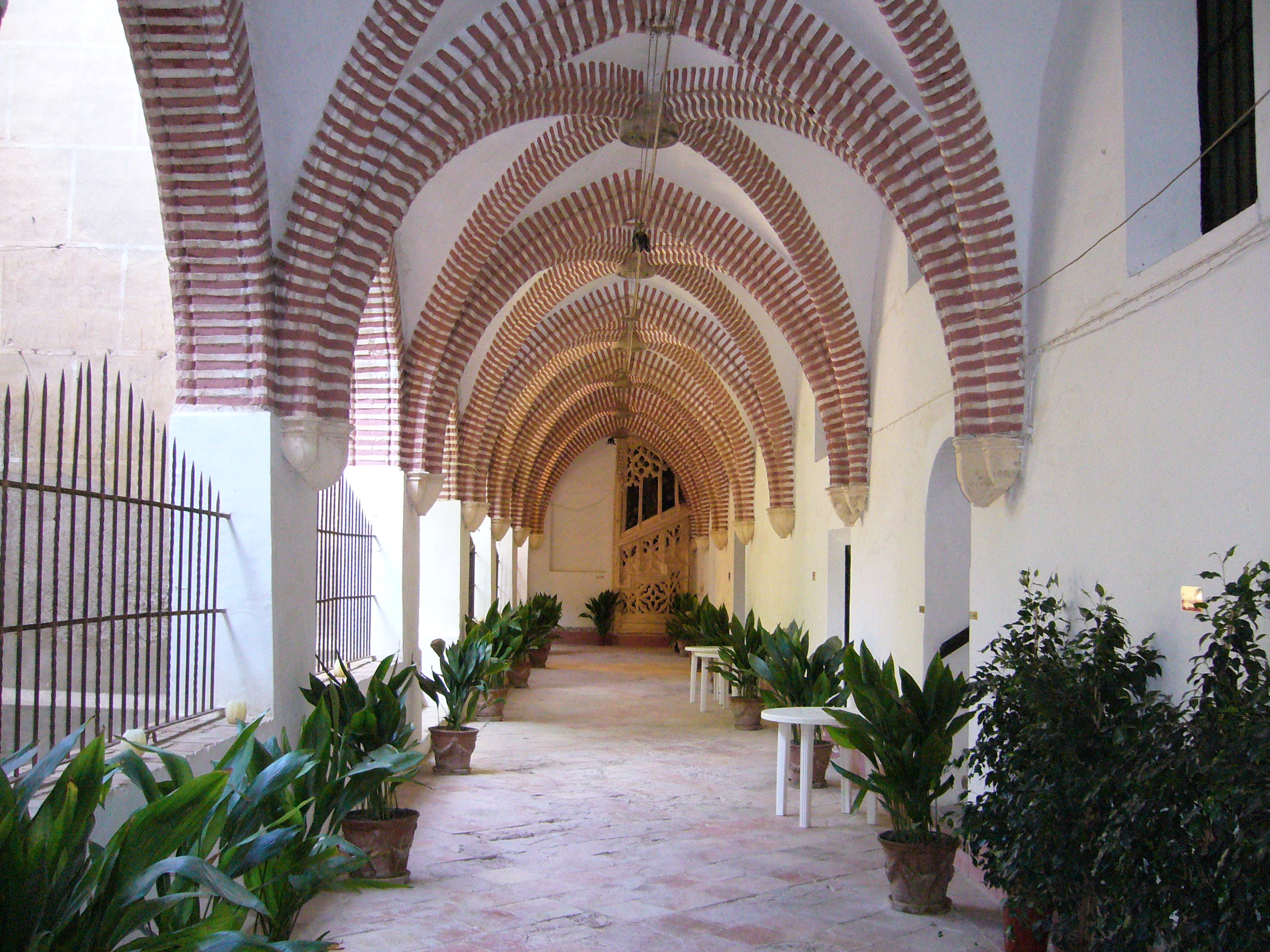
Monastery of Sant Jeroni de Cotalba.

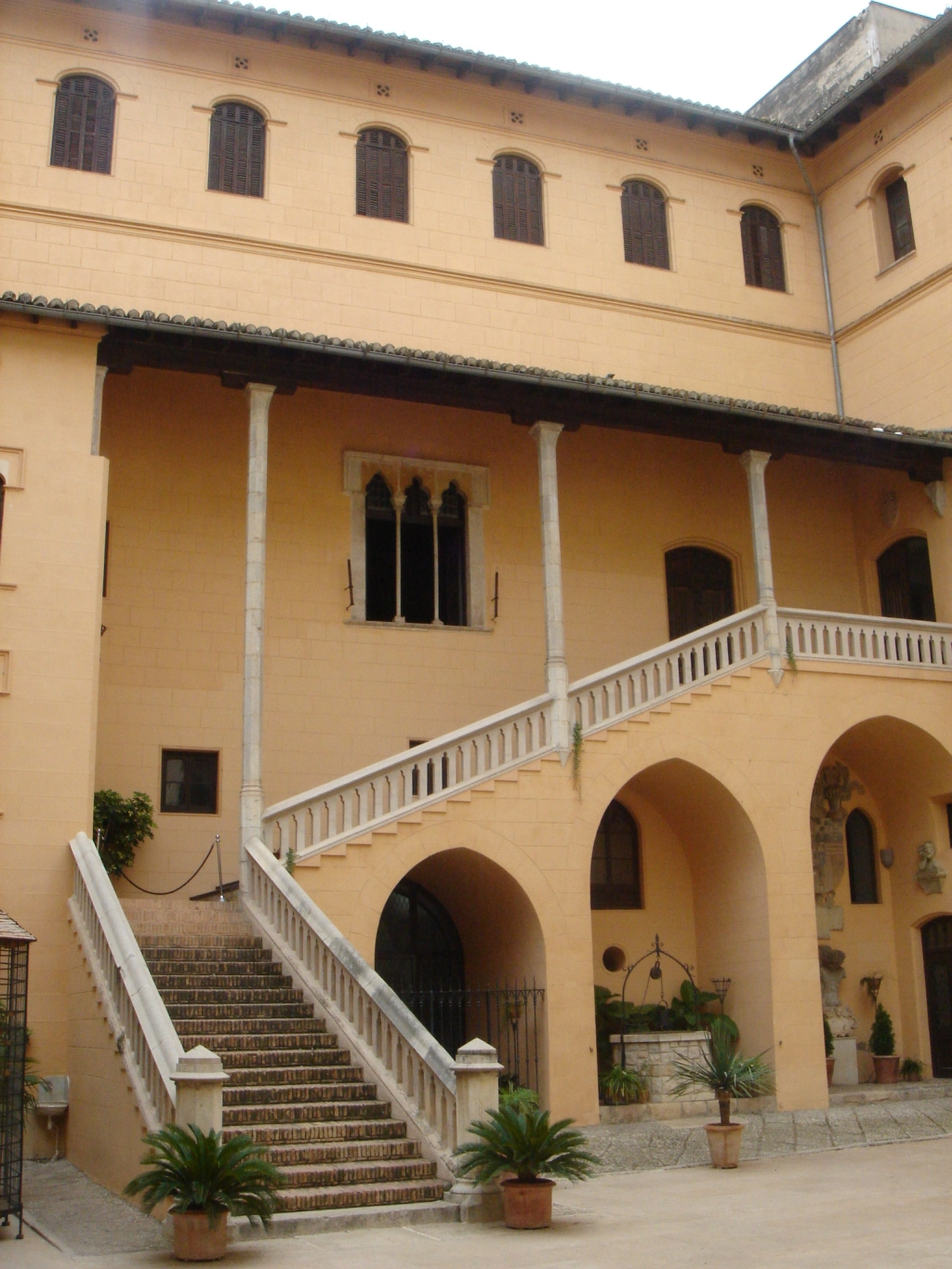
Ducal Palace of Gandia.

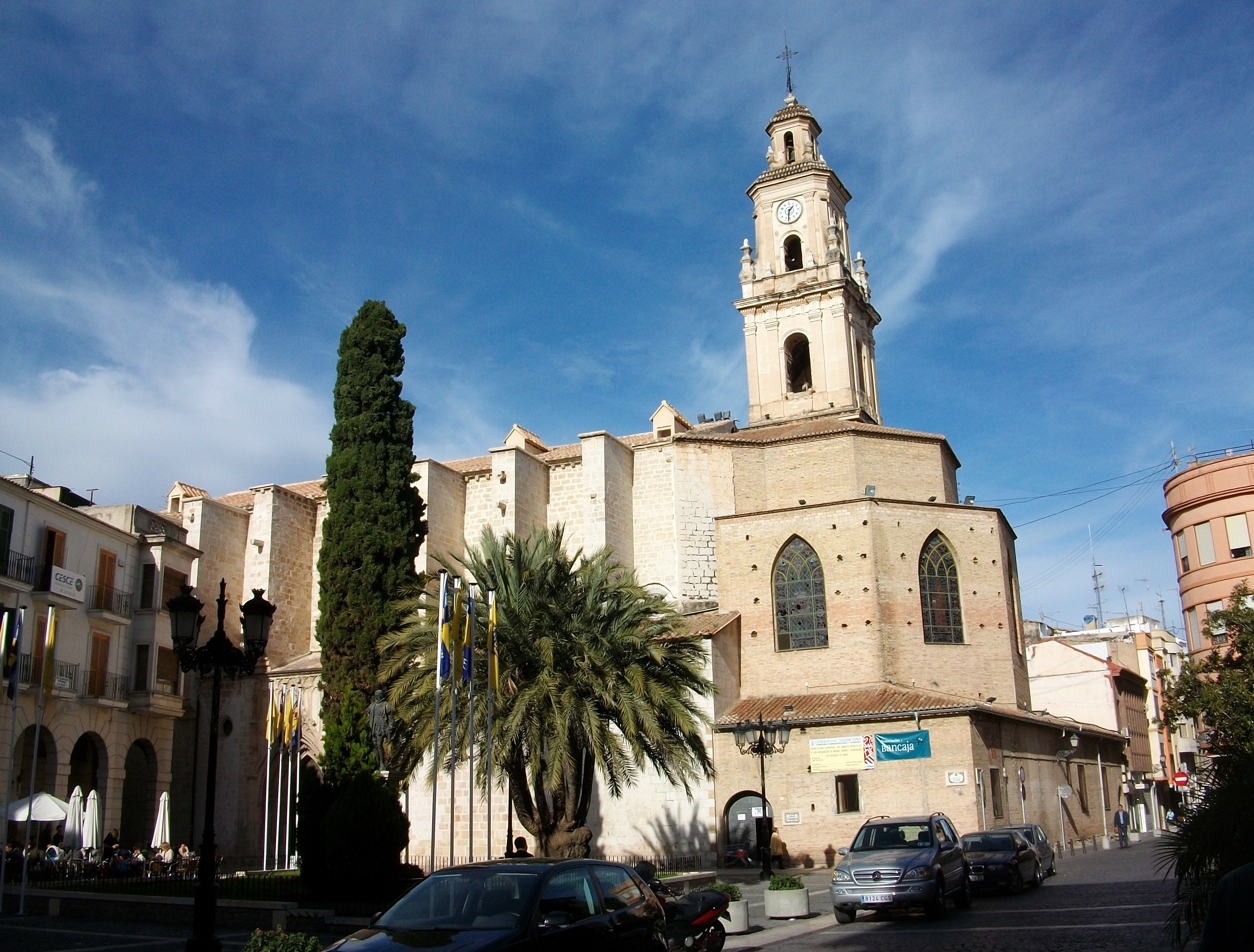
Collegiate Basilica of Gandia.

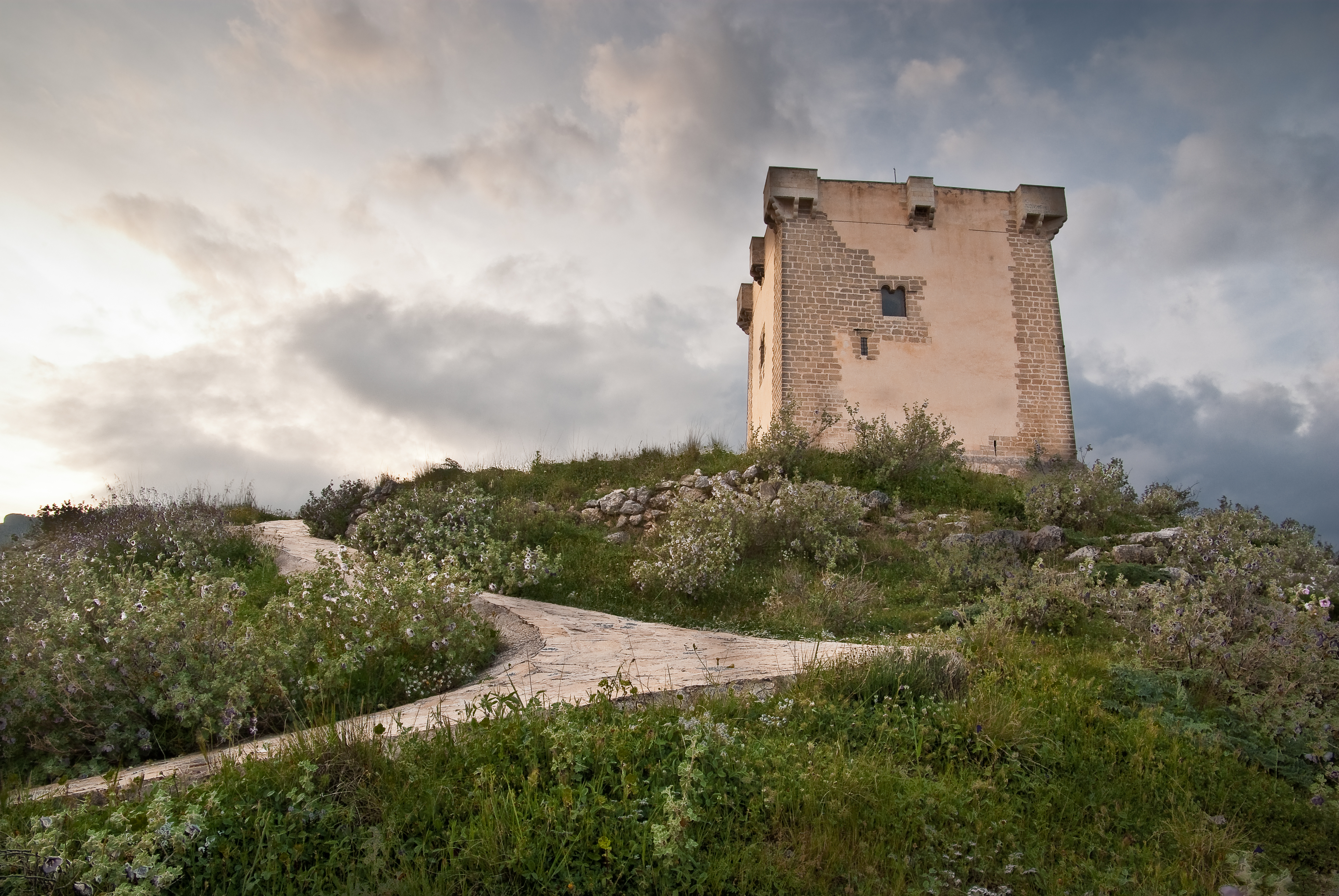
Castle of Cocentaina.

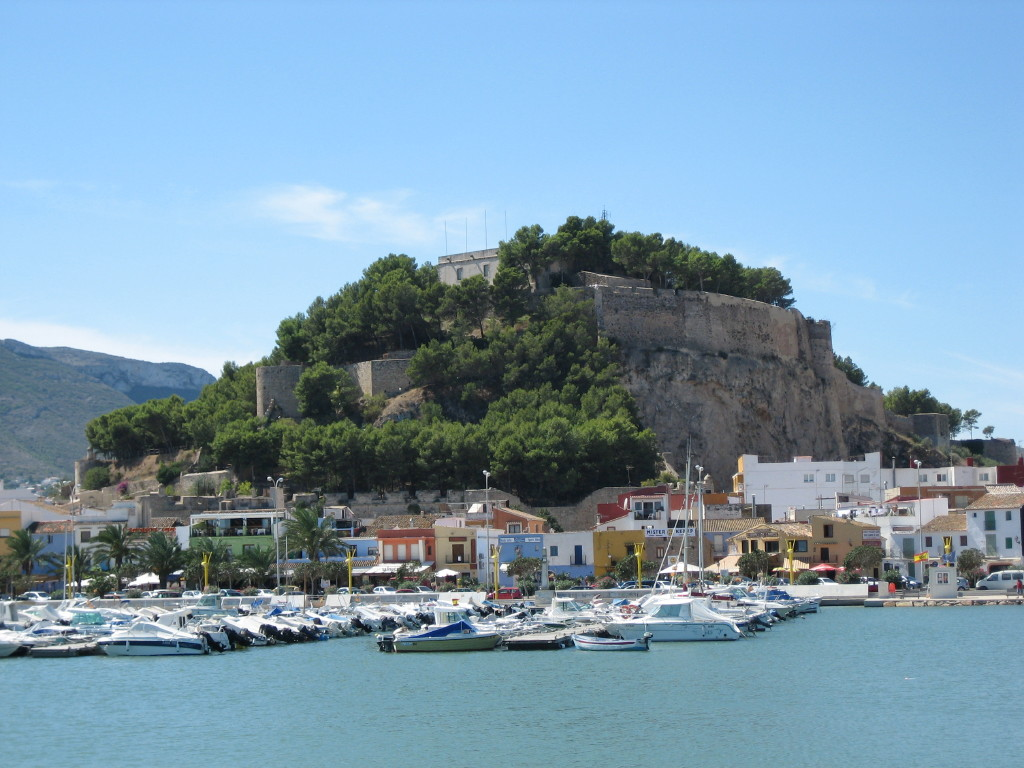
Castle of Denia.

The Route of the Valencian classics, (in Valencian Ruta dels clàssics valencians, in Spanish Ruta de los clásicos valencianos), is a cultural route through the lands of the great classical writers of the Valencian literature of the Valencian Golden Age: Ausiàs March, Joanot Martorell and Joan Roís de Corella, the three related to the court of the Duke Alfonso of Aragon and Foix, "the Old".

The route evokes the Valencian 15th century and its heritage, of the sea, of valleys and mountains, of gastronomy and wines, and the accents of the Valencian language with the echoes of the words of the Valencian writers.

== Itinerary ==
The route includes the following monuments and towns:

Gandía:

- Collegiate Basilica of Gandia
- Ducal Palace of Gandia
- Convent of Santa Clara
- Sant Marc Hospital

Beniarjó:

- Manor house of Ausias March

Alfauir:

- Monastery of Sant Jeroni de Cotalba

Albaida:

- Parish Church of the Asunción
- Palace of Milà i Aragó
- Segrelles Museum

Cocentaina:

- Palace of the Counts of Cocentaina
- Cocentaina Castle

Xaló:

- Manor house of Joanot Martorell
- Route of the Martorell

Dénia:

- Castle of Denia

== The Route step by step ==
Gandía: The ducal city was the epicenter of the literary renewal of the 15th century, where resided the Martorell, the March and the Roís de Corella families.

- Collegiate Basilica of Gandia: Example of Valencian religious Gothic, returns us the echo of classics and also the Borgia family, that consolidating the Duchy of Gandia in 1485.
- Ducal Palace of Gandia: In the Ducal Palace of Gandia these valencian classical writers were entered in the letters and arts of chivalry.
- Convent of Santa Clara: Its artistic treasure recalls the splendour of the ancient Duchy of Gandia. A canvas of walls from the 14th century on the river Serpis closes the medieval remains of the city.
- Sant Marc Hospital: Nowadays it's an Archaeological Museum, its Gothic arches take us back to the Middle Ages.

Beniarjó:

- Manor house of Ausiàs March

Alfauir:

- Monastery of Sant Jeroni de Cotalba: The father, Pere March, and the two wives of the well-known Valencian medieval poet Ausiàs March are buried in this monastery. The monastery is one of the most historic monastic constructions in the Valencian Community.

Albaida:

- Parish Church of the Asunción: The parish was built in the 13th century. The building was built between 1592 and 1621 in Valencian Gothic style. There are a set of interesting oil paintings by Josep Segrelles.
- Palace of Milà i Aragó: The remains of the walls from the 15th century configure a monumental heritage. Inside this palace nowaydays is the International Museum of Puppets of Albaida (MITA).
- Segrelles Museum: House Museum of the valencian painter Josep Segrelles.

Cocentaina:

- Palace of the Counts of Cocentaina: This palace belonged to the Rois de Corella family in the 15th century. Here we can also find towers and canvases of the wall, the medieval quarter.
- Cocentaina Castle: The castle dominates the whole region. Through these mountains we will find the fridges, snow deposits that were used for th ice trade.

The valley of Xaló: In search of the sea, it is obligatory to go through a land of mountains: the valleys of the Marina Alta (Planes, La Vall de Gallinera La Vall d'Alcalà and La Vall d'Ebo), where Al-Azraq, the Muslim leader, resisted the Aragonese conquest in the 13th century (the origin of the Moors and Christians festivity). The valley of Xaló belonged to the Martorell and the March families.

Xaló

- Manor house of the Martorell: In Xaló we can find this manor house of the writer Joanot Martorell refurbished in the 19th century.
- Route of the Martorell

Dénia: Alfonso of Aragon and Foix was also count of Denia, a city ruled by an attorney general and Ausias's father, called Pere March.

- Castle of Denia: On the walls and the castle, a contemporary of Ausias drew some graffiti or engravings of ships which were in the harbour. This is March's maritime landscape and it is evoked in the novel written by Joanot Martorell, Tirant lo Blanch. Visits to the Raset quarter, the Rotes coves, the feet of Montgo mountain are a must.

== See also ==
- Route of the Monasteries of Valencia
- Route of the Borgias
- Route of the Castles of Vinalopó
