= Iglesia de la Asunción, Albaida =

Parish Church of the Asunción of Albaida
- Església parroquial de l'Assunció d'Albaida; Iglesia de la Asunción
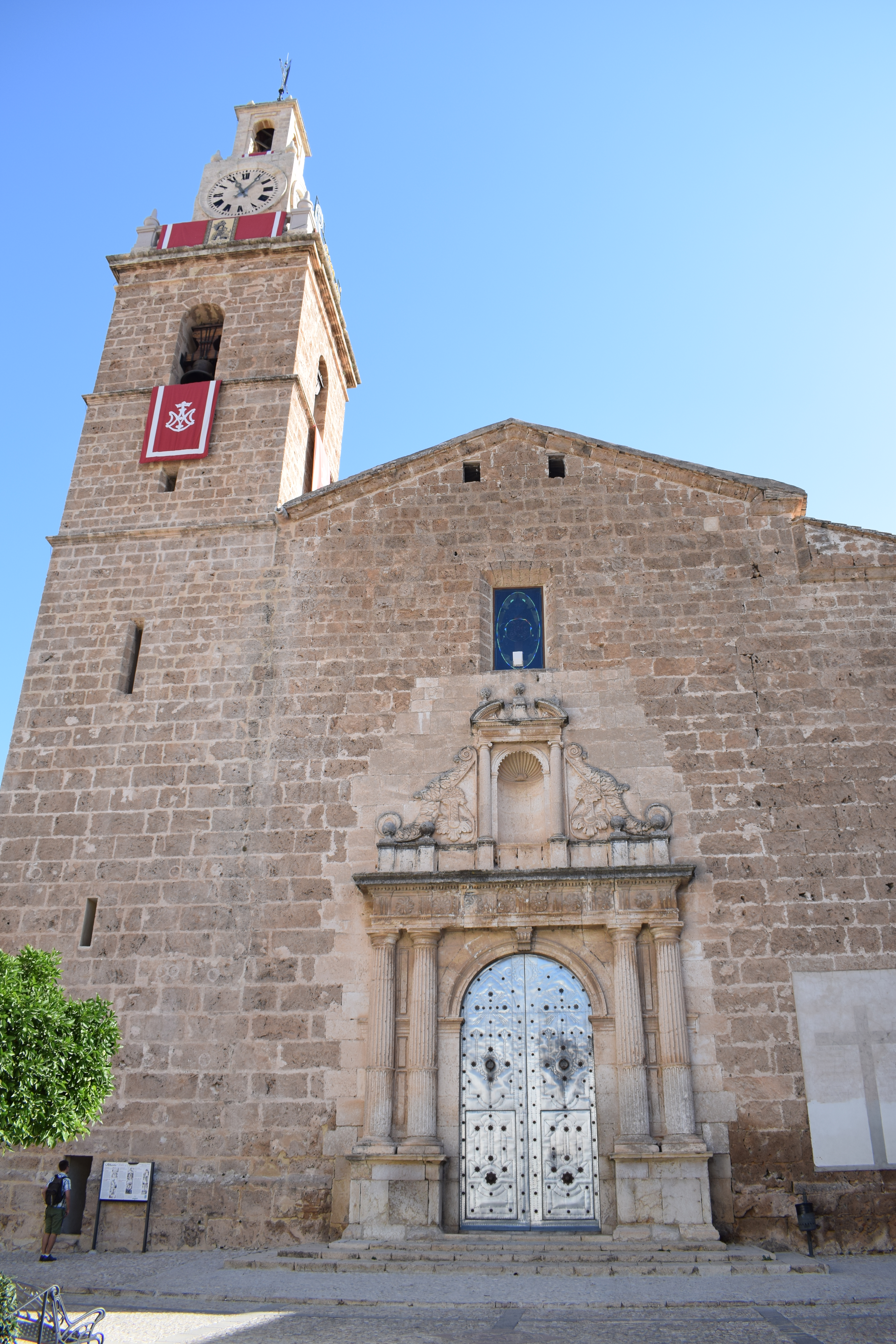
- Church de la Asunción of Albaida
- Parish Church of the Asunción of Albaida
- 38°50′32″N 0°31′11″W
- Location: Albaida (Valencian Community)
- Country: Spain
- Denomination: Roman Catholic

History
- Founded: October 26, 1499

Architecture
- Style: Gothic
- Years built: 1592-1621

Administration
- Diocese: Valencia

The Parish Church of la Asunción is a Catholic church located in the Painter Segrelles Square number 14, in the municipality of Albaida (Valencian Community), Spain. It is a good of local relevance with ID number 46.24.006-008.

The church continues to serve as a parish of the Archdiocese of Valencia in Spain into the 21st century.

== History ==
The parish was established in the 13th century. The building was built between 1592 and 1621 in Valencian Gothic style, replacing the old church of our Lady of the Assumption, built in the 13th century. It was restored in 1830.

== Description ==
The church consists of a single nave, with chapels between the buttress. The facade stands out for its simplicity and its two Renaissance doors. The slender bell tower square was used as a watch tower until an auction was added in the middle of 19th century. Inside, in the chapels, sculptures in Baroque Revival architecture style of Gallarza, the imperial bed of our Lady of August (17th century) and the baptismal are marble (18th century).

There are a set of oil paintings by Josep Segrelles in the altar (17th century). Segrelles also are paintings of religious scenes of Albaida between the arches of the chapels and cornice of the ship, as well as the paintings of the chapel Real of the communion, adjacent building from the 19th century. The sacristy retains several luxurious ornaments from the 15th to the 20th centuries, highlighting the true cross, a reliquary of Gothic silverware, possibly from the 15th century.

== See also ==
- Route of the Valencian classics
