= Route of the Borgias =

Cultural tour of historical sites

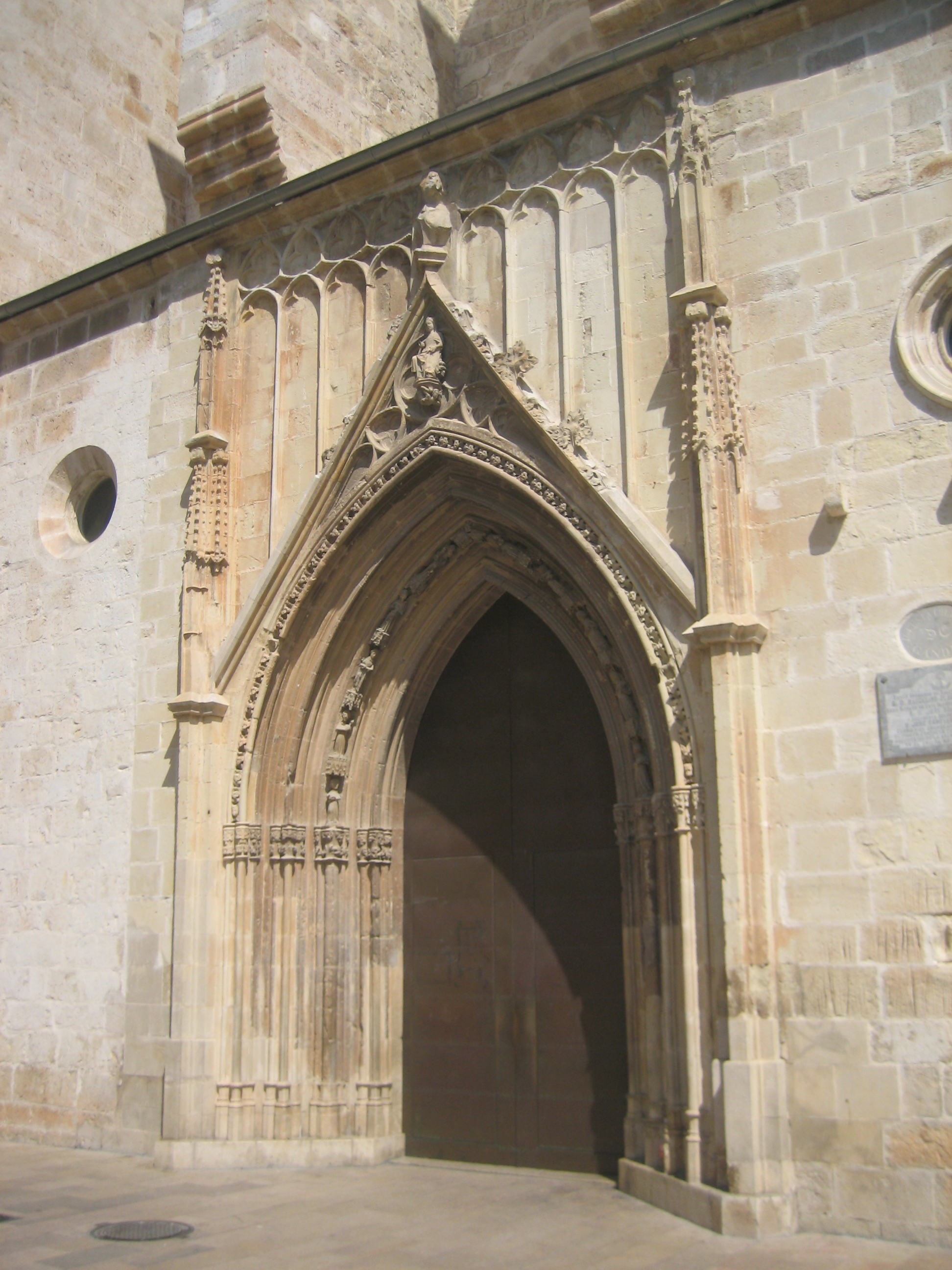
Holy Mary's door in the Collegiate Basilica of Gandia.

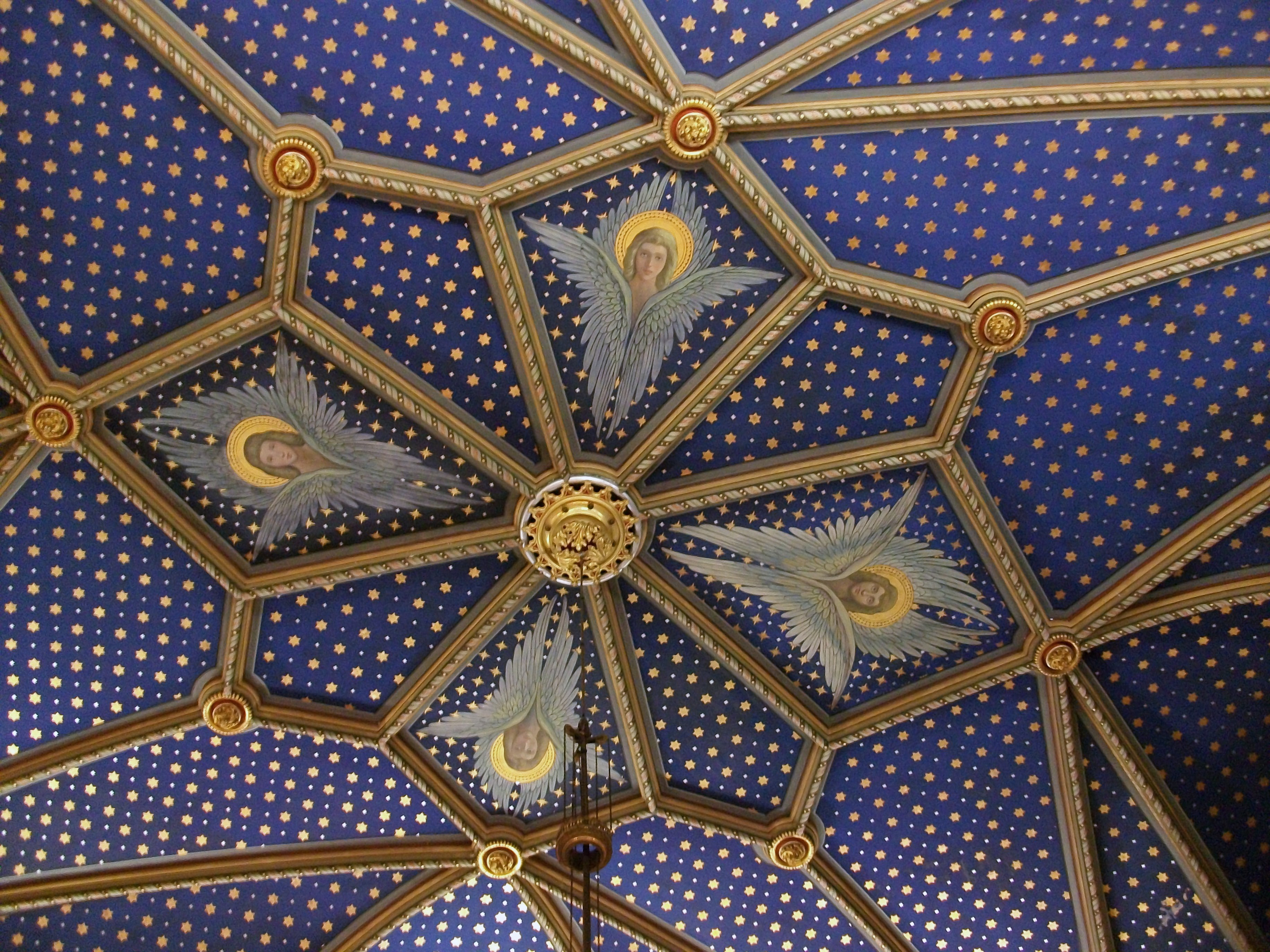
Detail of the Ducal Palace of Gandía.

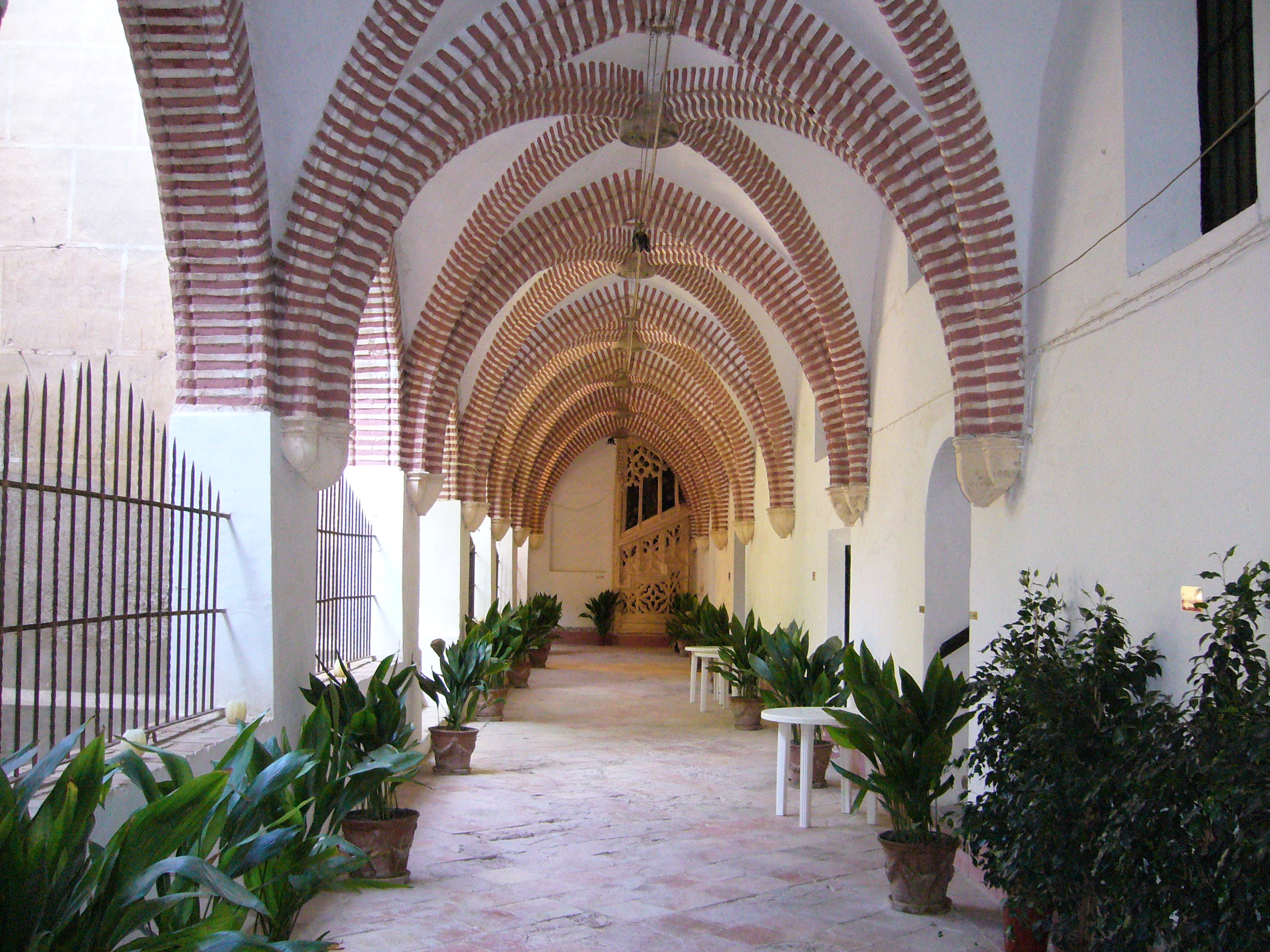
Gothic-mudéjar cloister of the Monastery of Sant Jeroni de Cotalba, 14th century.

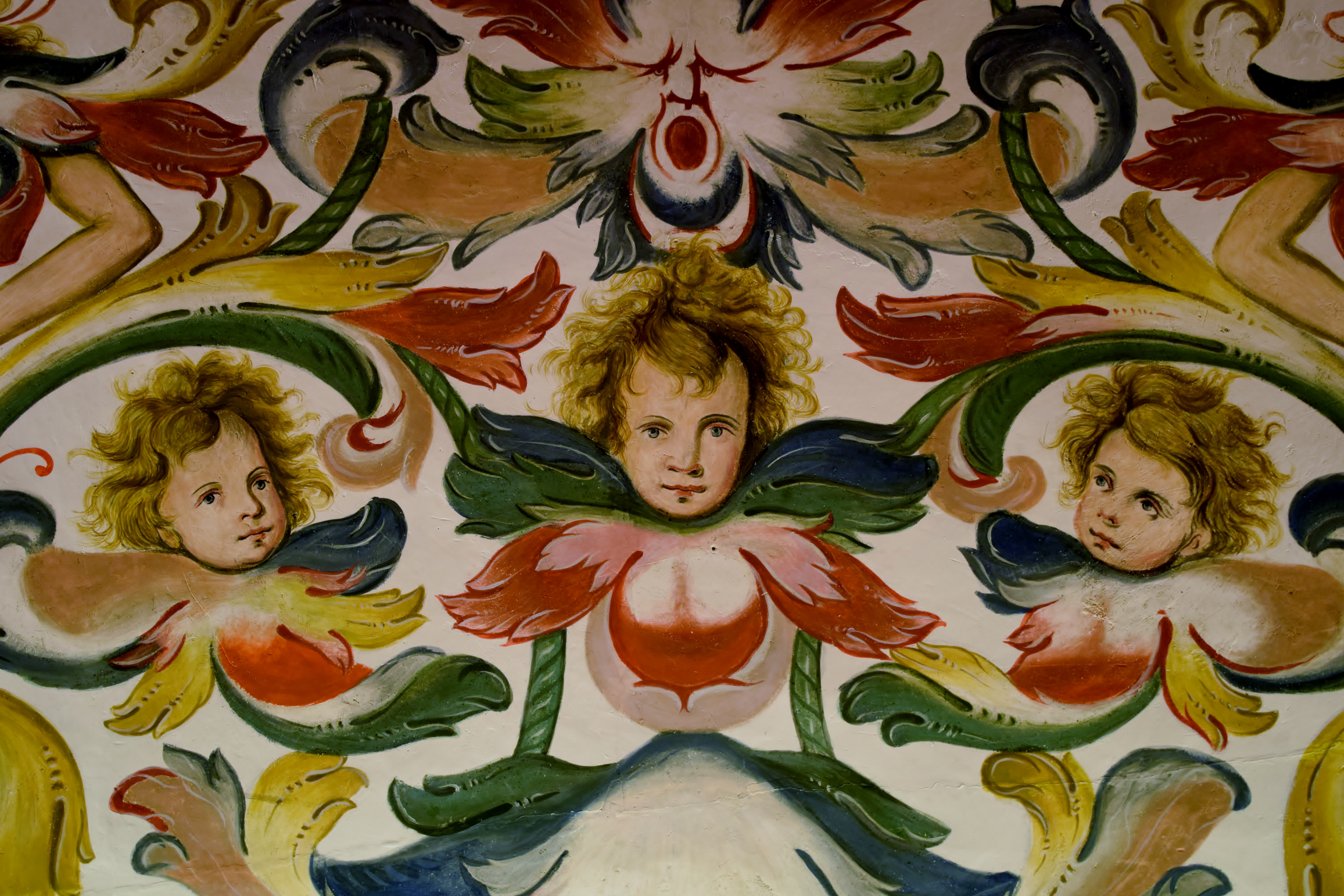
Detail of the roof in the Palace of Milà i Aragó, in Albaida.

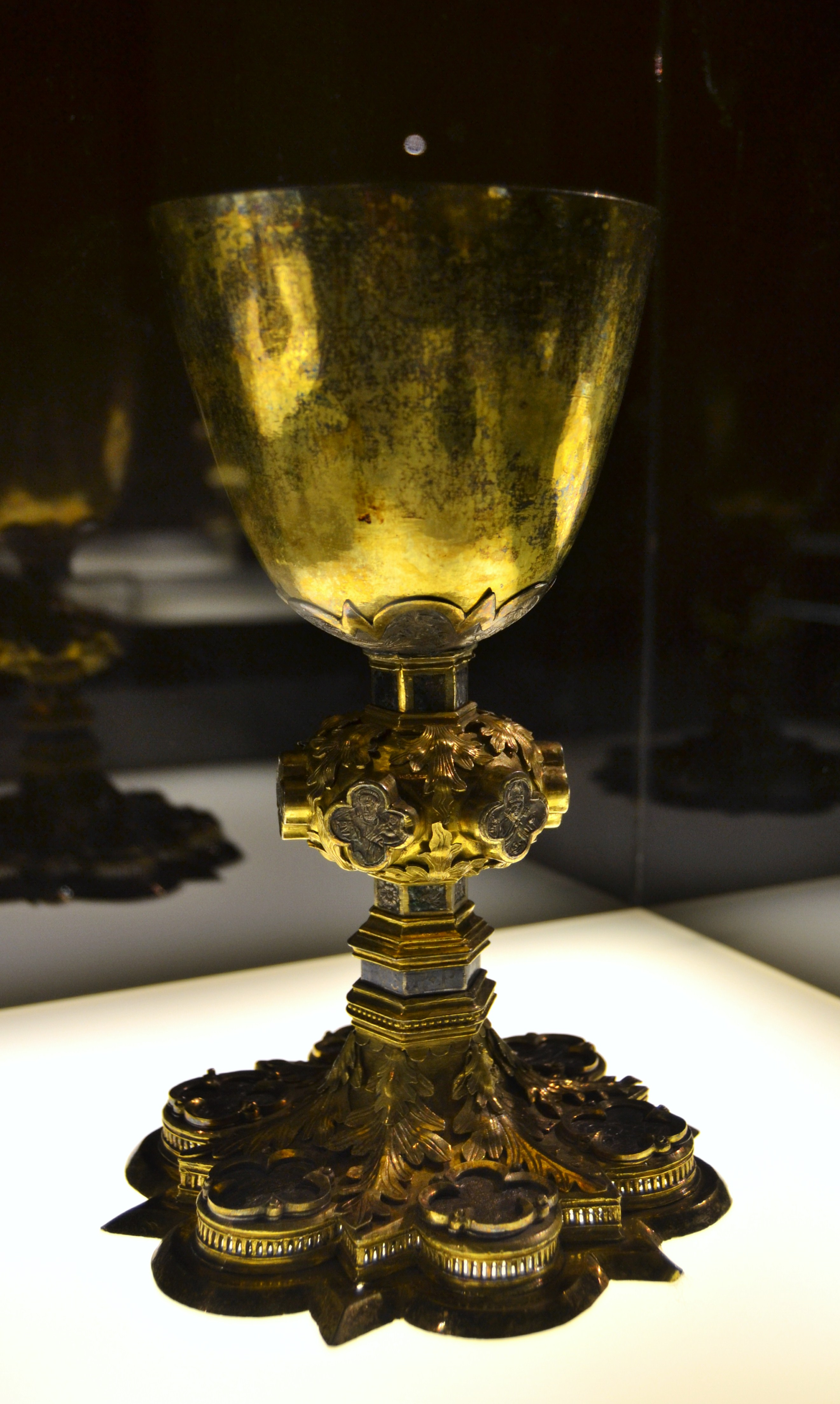
Chalice of the Pope Callixtus III at the museum of the Collegiate Basilica of Xàtiva.

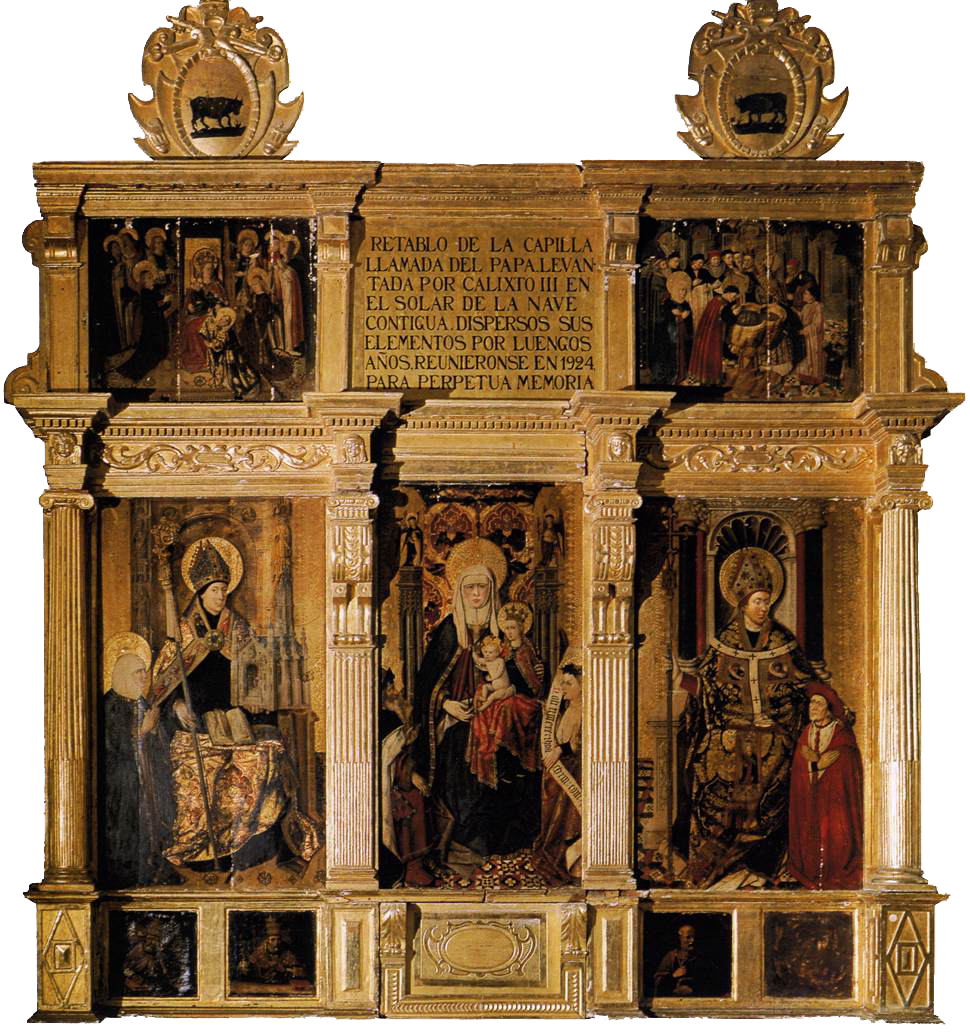
Triptych of Jacomart for the Borgias at the museum of the Collegiate Basilica of Xàtiva.

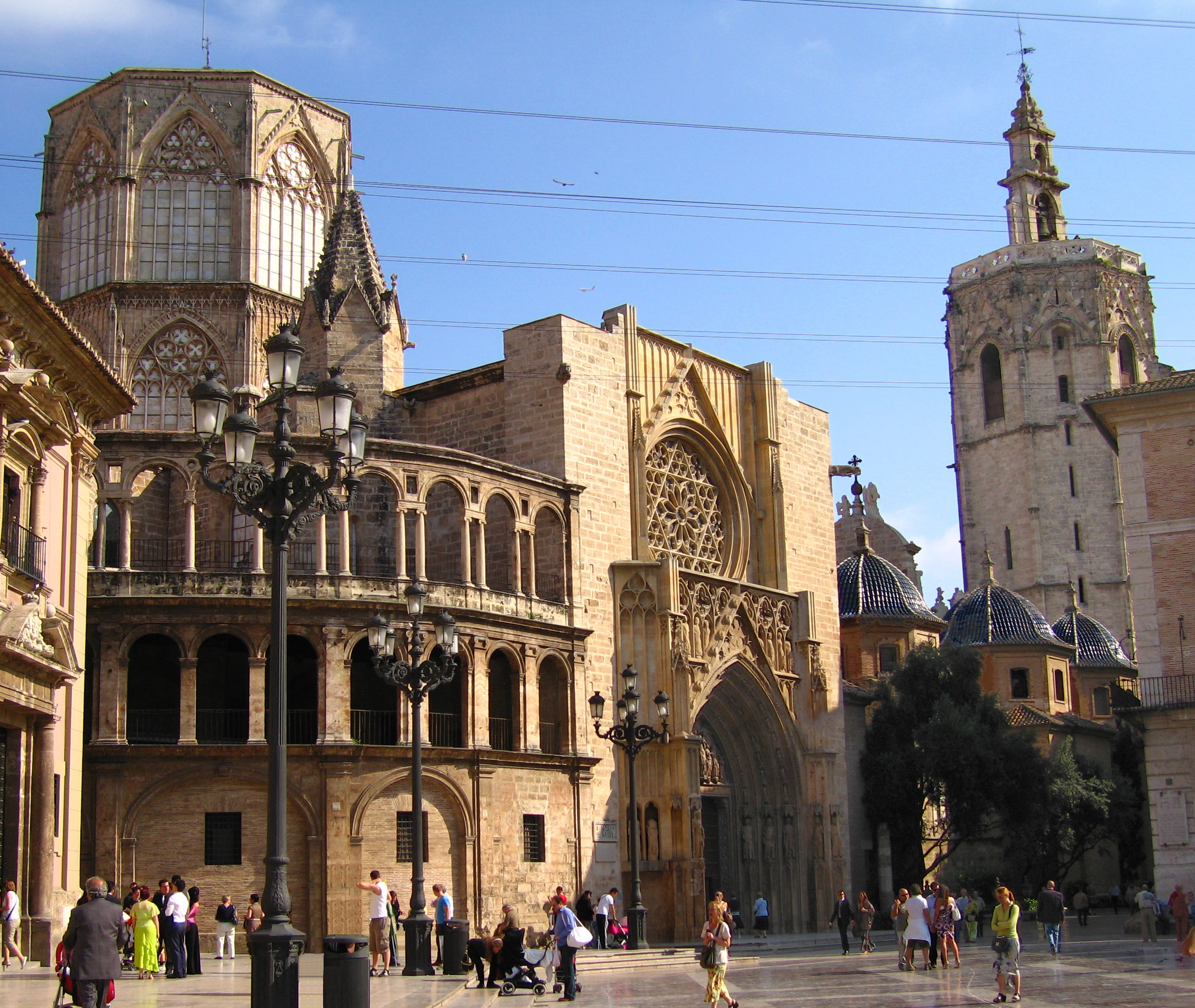
Detail of the Valencia Cathedral.

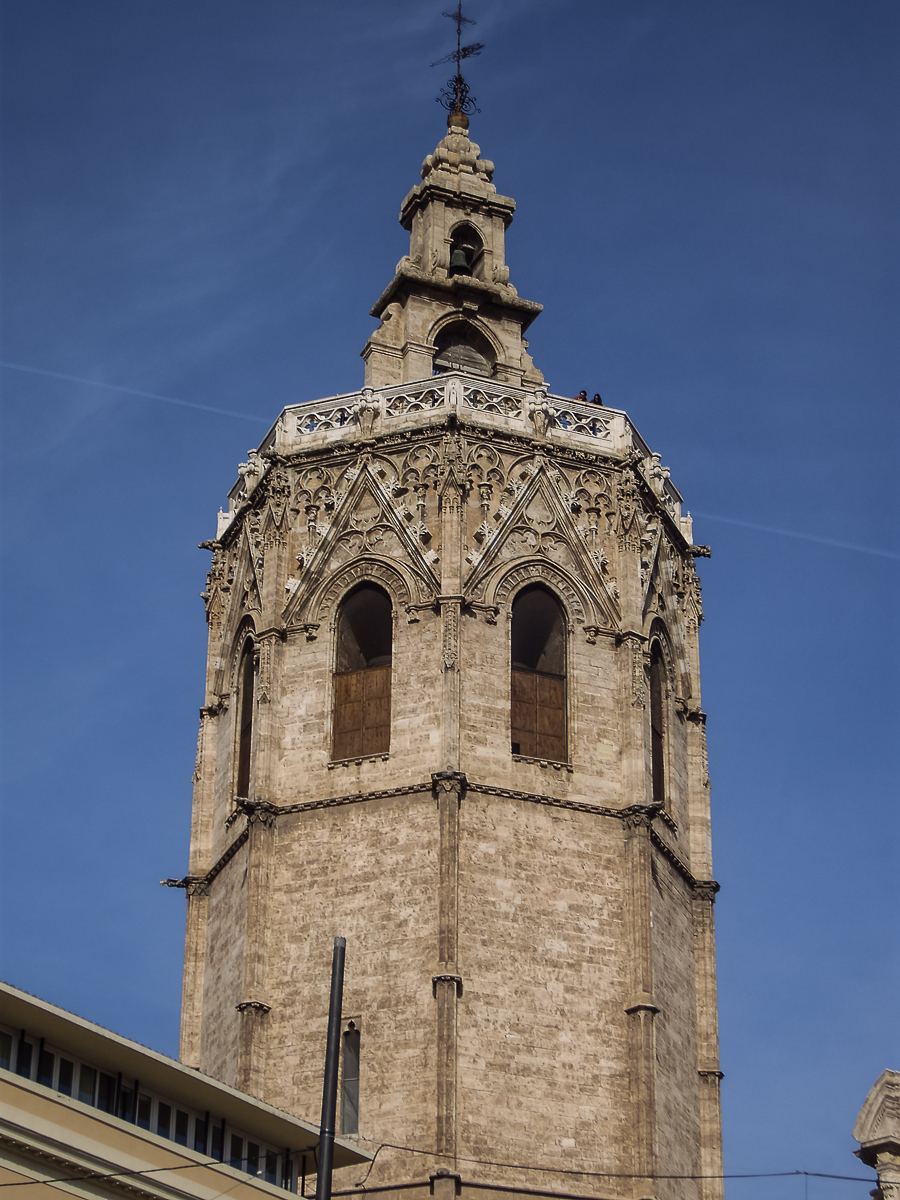
The "Micalet", tower of the Valencia Cathedral.

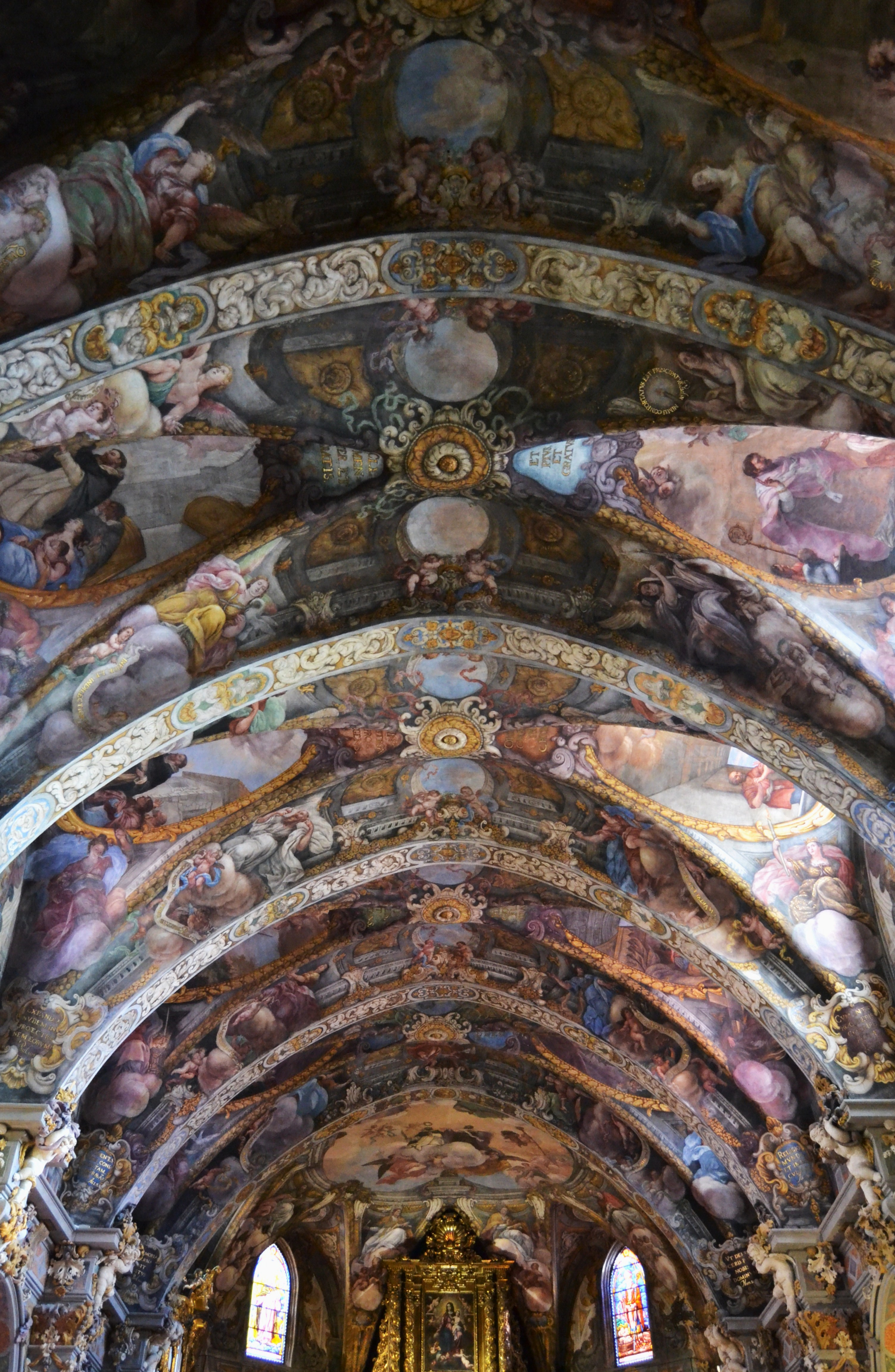
Frescoes of the Church of San Nicolás, Valencia.

The Route of the Borgias is a cultural route, that includes sites associated with the Borja or Borgia, located in their native Valencian Community, Spain. The marketing of the route was inaugurated in 2007.

The Borgias were a family of Aragonese origin, who settled in the Kingdom of Valencia, after its King James I of Aragon wrested control from Moorish rulers. In most translations, the family is known as the Borgia, the Italian way of transcribing the Borja surname from Valencian.

The Popes Callixtus III and Alexander VI, Cesare Borgia and Lucrezia Borgia and Francis Borgia are the best-known figures of this lineage that originated in Canals and Xàtiva, and via Valencia came to Rome, then return to Valencia to refound the Duchy of Gandia.

The route through the legacy of the Borgias has its beginning in the city of Gandia and ends in Valencia passing through various monuments and Valencian towns where the Borja left their mark.

== Itinerary ==
The route includes the following monuments and towns:

Gandia:

- Collegiate Basilica of Gandia
- Ducal Palace of Gandia
- Convent of Santa Clara
- Sant Marc Hospital

Alfauir

- Monastery of Sant Jeroni de Cotalba

Simat de la Valldigna

- Monastery of Santa María de la Valldigna

Albaida

- Palace of Milà i Aragó

Castelló de Rugat

- Remains of the Ducal Palace

Canals

- Oratory of the Borgias
- Tower and walls of the Borgias

Xàtiva

- Collegiate Basilica of Xàtiva
- Natal house of Alexander VI
- Hermitage of Santa Ana

Llombai

- Church of the Holy Cross

Valencia

- Valencia Cathedral
- Palace of the Borgias
- University of Valencia (Estudio General)
- Church of San Nicolás

Castellnovo (Castellón)

- Castellnovo Castle

== The Route step by step ==
Gandia: The vestige of the Borgia in Gandia is extensive.

- The Collegiate Basilica of Gandia was expanded by Maria Enriquez de Luna, widow of the second duke, Juan Borgia, and daughter-in-law of Alexander VI. She had the Apostles Door built by the famous sculptor Damià Forment and had the major altarpiece, nowadays disappeared, painted by Paolo da San Leocadio.
- Most of the Borgia dukes and their descendants were born in the Ducal Palace of Gandia, built in times of the royal dukes. The arms courtyard, the crown assembly hall, the eagles' hall and the stunning gold gallery are worth seeing. Inside the building you can find the Space of Emotions (Espacio de las Emociones), a centre for virtual interpretation that will carry the visitor back to the Borgia time.
- The Convent of Santa Clara has an important art collection bequeathed by the Borgia. Several monasteries were founded over the peninsula from this convent, such as the Convent of Las Descalzas Reales of Madrid or the one in Setubal (Portugal). The pine tower, from the 16th century, was part of the wall enlargement carried out by the IV Duke of Gandia, Saint Francis Borgia. His successor, Carlos Borgia, founded the convent of Sant Roc, which is now a cultural centre and was a baroque church in the 18th century.
- The Sant Marc Hospital was governed by the Dukes of Gandia, is today the archaeological museum of the city (MaGa).

Alfauir

- The Monastery of Sant Jeroni de Cotalba founded in 1388 and located about eight kilometres outside Gandia, came under the protection of the House of Borgia in the 16th century. The Duchess of Gandia, Maria Enríquez de Luna, widow of the duke Giovanni Borgia and daughter-in-law of the Pope Alexander VI, financed the monastery's enlargement such as the upper cloister of late Valencian Gothic style or the medieval cistern of the Orange Tree Patio. Later, also Saint Francis Borgia frequented the monastery and his wife, Leonor de Castro, lady and intimate friend of the Empress Isabella of Portugal, spent her last days in it recovering from her ailments.

Simat de la Valldigna

- In Simat we can find the Monastery of Santa María de la Valldigna, a Cistercian monastery built in 1298 by Jaime II. Rodrigo Borgia and his son Cesare were the monastery abbots. From its remains is possible to see the royal door, the convent, the chapter-house, the cloister and the abbot palace. Different earthquakes have destroyed the church and the one that is possible to see nowadays has a baroque style.

Albaida

- Palace of Milà i Aragó: The palace was constructed by the cardinal Luis de Milà y de Borja, nephew of the Pope Callixtus III, who after being papal vicarious in Rome, built this palace in the center of the municipality.

Canals

- Tower and walls of the Borgias: According to the tradition, Alfonso Borgia, the future Pope Calixtus III, was born in the Tower of Canals.
- Opposite the tower we can find the Oratory of the Borgias, with a medieval altarpiece about the Last Judgement, by the master of Borboto. Both buildings are worth visiting.

Xativa: The legacy of the Borja in Xativa is important.

- In the Collegiate Basilica of Xàtiva where different members of the Borgia family are buried, is possible to see at the museum the altarpiece of the cardinal Alfonso Borgia and a silver chalice with the name of the Pope Calixtus III and another artworks of the Borgia family.
- Natal house of Alexander VI: Rodrigo Borgia, Pope Alexander VI, was born in Xativa and was christened in the church of San Pedro in 1431. Both, the birthplace and the church can be visited.
- Another Borgian place in Xativa is the Hermitage of Santa Ana, patron saint of the family.

Valencia: The legacy of the family in the capital of the Kingdom of Valencia was numerous.

- In the Valencia Cathedral the Pope Callixtus III had the Chapel of "San Pedro" (Saint Peter) built. The Pope Alexander VI, before becoming pope, ordered the Italian painter Paolo da San Leocadio to paint frescoes for the dome of the apse. This was part of the beginning of the Italian Renaissance painting in Spain. In the chapel devoted to Saint Francis Borgia there are two Goya canvasses for the fourth duke of Gandia.
- The Palace of the Borgias, built by the first duke of Gandia and son of Alexander VI, Pedro Luis Borgia, is currently the headquarters for the Valencian Parliament (Cortes Valencianas).
- The University of Valencia (Estudio General) was founded in 1500 thanks to the papal bull of the Pope Alexander VI. Its Renaissance cloister is worth seeing.
- In the Church of San Nicolás, of which the Pope Callixtus III was rector before becoming Pope, in the door that overlooks to the square of San Nicolás, is remembered with tiles the prediction of Saint Vincent Ferrer according to which Alfonso de Borja would become Pope and then will canonize him.

== Bibliography ==
- José María Cruselles Gómez: Los Borja en Valencia. Nota sobre historiografia, historicismo y pseudohistoria University of Valencia. (in Spanish)
- Bibliography of the Route of the Borgias Cámara de Valencia. (in Spanish)
- Santiago La Parra: "La ruta valenciana de los Borja". Escapadas-Punto Cero. Gandía, 1997. ISBN 84-605-6908-X.
- Antoni Atienza Peñarroja. "Els Borja, valencians". Editorial L'Oronella. Valencia. 2003. ISBN 848973741X
- Martí Domínguez: "Els Borja". CEIC "Alfons el Vell", Gandia, 1985. ISBN 9788450527629.
- VV.AA.: Los Borja: del mundo gótico al universo renacentista (cat.exposición), Museo de Bellas Artes de Valencia, Generalitat Valenciana, 2001.
- VV.AA.: El hogar de los Borja (cat.exposición), Ajuntament de Xàtiva, 2001.
- VV.AA.: Xàtiva. L’espai del Borja. Itinerari fotográfic, Ajuntament de Xàtiva, 1992.
- VV.AA.: Els Borja a la sotsgovernació de Xàtiva (cat.exposición), Ajuntament de Xàtiva, 1994.
- VV.AA.: Xàtiva, Els Borja. Una projecció Europea (cat.exposición), Ajuntament de Xàtiva, 1994.

== See also ==
- House of Borgia
- Duke of Gandía
- Monastery of Sant Jeroni de Cotalba
- Route of the Monasteries of Valencia
- Route of the Valencian classics
- Route of the Castles of Vinalopó
