= Palace of Milà i Aragó =

- Palau dels Milà i Aragó (Valencian); Castillo-Palacio de los Milán de Aragón (Spanish)
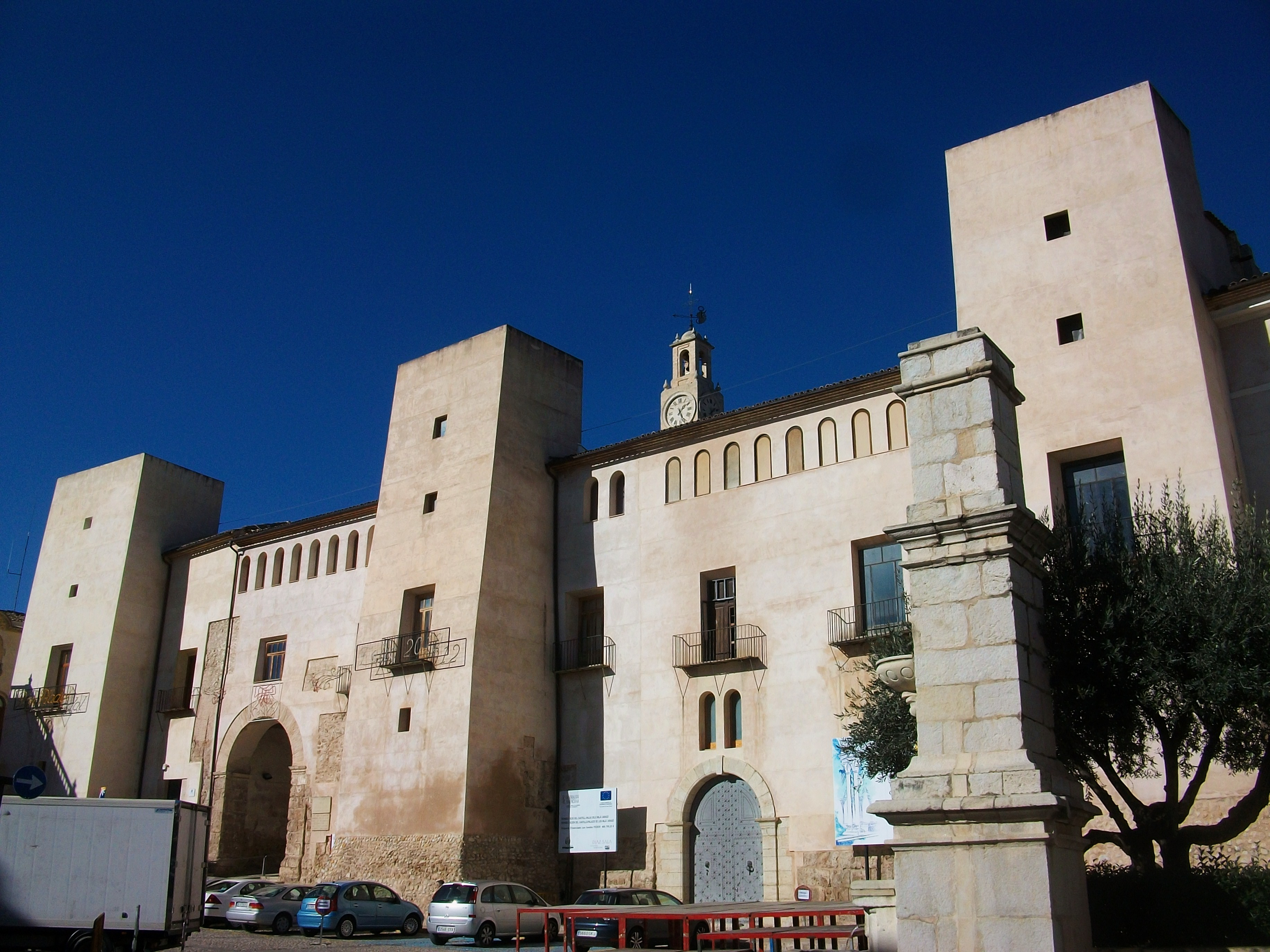

- Location within Spain
- 38.84195°N 0.519222°W
- Type: Palace
- Location: Albaida

History
- Built: 1471–1477

Site notes
- Architectural styles: Valencian Gothic, Renaissance and Baroque architecture

The Palace of Milà i Aragó, also known as the palace of the marquises of Albaida, is regarded as the most emblematic building of the town of Albaida, Valencian Community, Spain. It is considered a Place of Cultural Interest. Nowadays, in its interior there is a tourist office and the Museu Internacional de Titelles d'Albaida (International Museum of Puppets of Albaida).

== History ==
It is thought that before the current building there was a lord's palace, fortified in such a way as to protect it from any angle. Although there is little information about the original building, it is likely that admiral Conrad Llança ordered its construction—after having been granted the baronies of Albaida and Carrícola (1279), and Montaverner (1286). The manor of Albaida was confiscated in order to grant it to Berenguer de Vilaragut—lineage that would remain in power until 1471. The fact that there were domestic quarters within the palace did not mean that the palace was always inhabited. Actually, the Vilaragut lived almost the whole year in their own personal palace in the kingdom's capital, close to the king. Nevertheless, there were occasions when the Vilaragut moved to Albaida, where they had a palace, in order to defend the city, as was the case in 1429 when Pere Pardo de la Casta, spouse of the baroness Carroça de Vilaragut, went to fight for the city against the Castilians during the War of Castile.

Due to the family's financial issues, the Crown seized the property and auctioned the town and the barony of Albaida. Cardinal Lluís Joan del Milà, nephew of Pope Callixtus III and first cousin of the future Pope Alexander VI, was the purchaser. His son, Jaume del Milà married Elionor d'Aragó, niece of the king Ferdinand II of Aragon, the Catholic, and first cousin of the emperor Charles V, Holy Roman Emperor. This meant that the title of count was conferred on those who owned the territory and resulted in a union between the two families, Milà and Aragó (1477). In 1477 the cardinal of Milà took up residence in the properties he had acquired in 1471, first in Albaida and then in Carrícola. In the document in which he transferred the barony of Albaida to his son, he makes known in writing the fortalitio dominali hospitio of the town, that is the fortress or stately home, which corresponds to the initial phase of the current palace. This early palace had an L-shaped plan, an attached patio, a fortified access and the large west tower. Furthermore, the palace strengthened the most vulnerable part of the city's enclosure because it was built on the wall and next to the new entrance to the town (constructed in 1460). Between 1525 and 1550, a new wing was built that enclosed the palace courtyard and made a quadrangular building with a centralized plan, like so many other Valencian Gothic palaces. The palace courtyard was paved with river stones and had a well in the middle, a porch with pillars and above it a gallery or balcony surrounding the main floor was located. This reform is recognizable by the beam configuration and Renaissance plasterwork. Also, two fortification towers, the eastern tower and the one in the middle, were integrated into the building wall. The result of this work was that the building's orientation was redirected to the main square. These modifications transformed the building from a military fortification into a palace. Balconies were open on the main floor, weakening the military defence provided by the wall and a gallery of Roman arches was built too.

In the late sixteenth and early seventeenth century, the archpriestal church of Santa Maria of Albaida was built in place of one of the palace's four wings (between 1592 and 1624). This was the occasion for the counts (marquises since 1604) to make the last major structural alteration of the building. Some old houses were knocked down to create an inner garden. As a result, the parade ground disappeared and a new wing was built next to the east tower, following the line of the wall (c. 1610). Therefore, the palace, initially a building enclosing its patio, now opens out to the main square, forming a wall between the town and the church. Due to the fact that the castle was based on the original wall, the church had remained isolated from the village, hence it was necessary to go to the west side to gain access through the only door in the town.

During the years 1767–1768, the double arch was opened between the western tower and the middle one. This arch gives access to side façade of the church through a stairway. The initiative came from the landed oligarchy, who requested the marquis licence to carry out the construction. The marquis lived in the Major Square and in a side street, which was called Carrer Nou. Once the work was finished, a small chapel under the arch was opened. An image of the Albaida's patron saint was placed there, called, Mare de Déu del Remei.

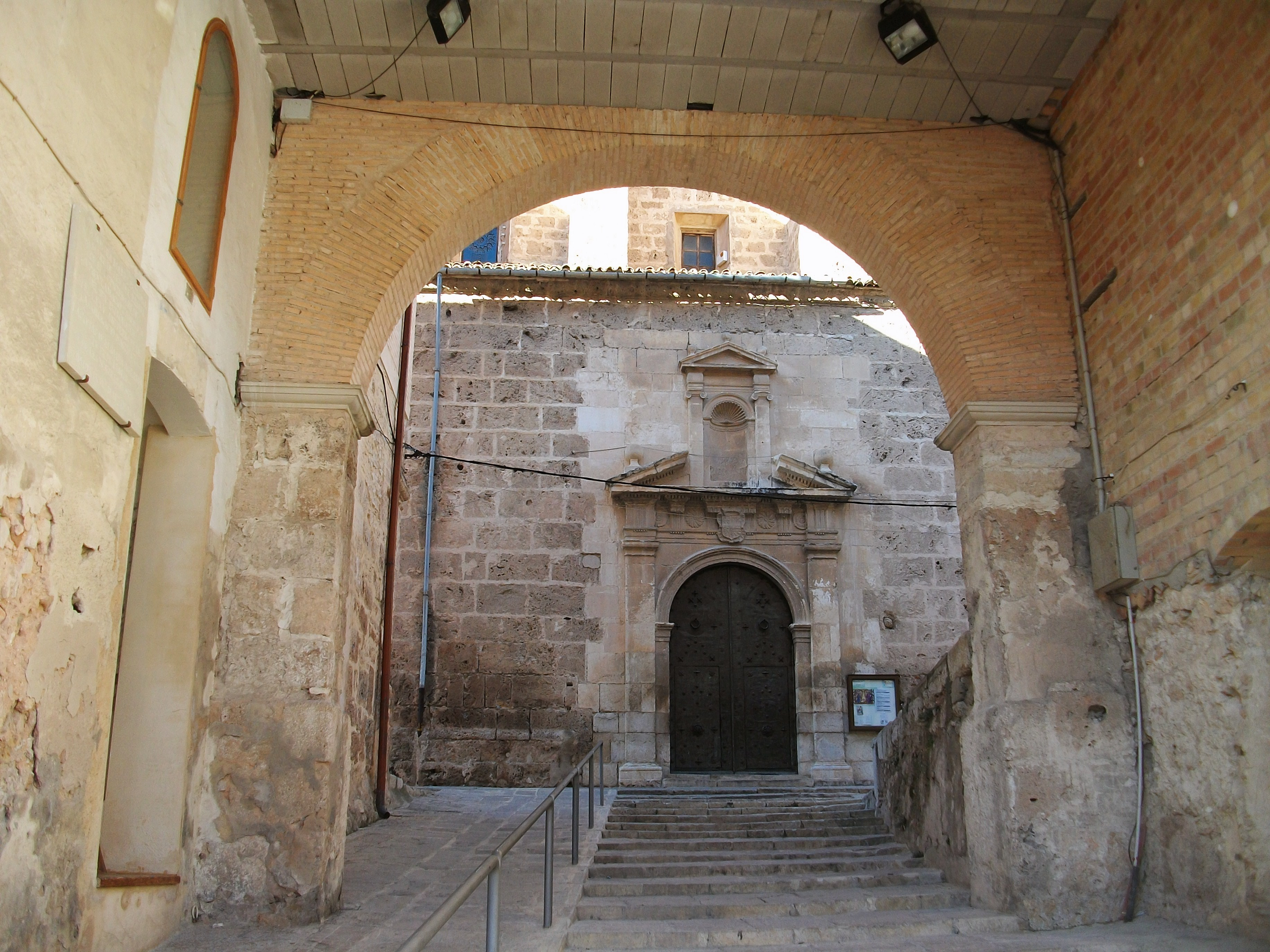
Arch between the Major Square and the church through the palace of Milà i Aragó, Albaida.

The lineage of Milà i Aragó was the county owner, becoming later a marquessate throughout the Modern Age until the main branch of the family became extinct. The title passed to the Orense's family in 1841. The palace was temporarily occupied by this family until the marquessate owner between 1865 and 1880, José María Orense, moved from Valencia to Madrid so as to preside the Constituent Assembly of the First Spanish Republic and to do politics.

In 1896, the palace was acquired by a landowner and wax producer from Albaida, known as the Marquis of Corbellot. When the next century came, the new owner opened a new door to access the palace from the Major Square, which was located between the middle tower and the east one. Since 1912, the owner and resident of the palace, Tomàs Monzó, had been turning parts of the building into rental housing, inn, and casino. Since 1918, the heiress of this Marquis, Marieta Monzó, hosted in the palace a catholic and burgeois association, called La Dominical. It was dedicated to the education of the workers’ daughters. After entering the Esclaves de Benirredrà convent, the owner ceded the palace to this association. The rest of the family took advantage of that opportunity to loot personal property and a paper industry from Alcoi recycled the whole documentary archive of the marquisate of Albaida.

Between 1938 and 1939, during the Spanish Civil War, the palace housed the Center for Recruitment and Militias in Valencia, fleeing from the capital that was besieged by the army of the dictator Francisco Franco. Once the war was over, the building was temporarily used as a regional prison, and later, it was again managed by La Dominical, having school functions and being a centre for spiritual exercises.

In 1986, during the night of 26 December, the palace was hit by a fire affecting the west wing, the oldest one. In November 1987 the lack of funds for emergency works, which consisted in the consolidation of the roof, caused the collapse of this side of the palace. The main reason was the rain, and just the exterior walls remained.

Since 1994, reinforcement and restoration works have been carried out in the palace.

== Building ==
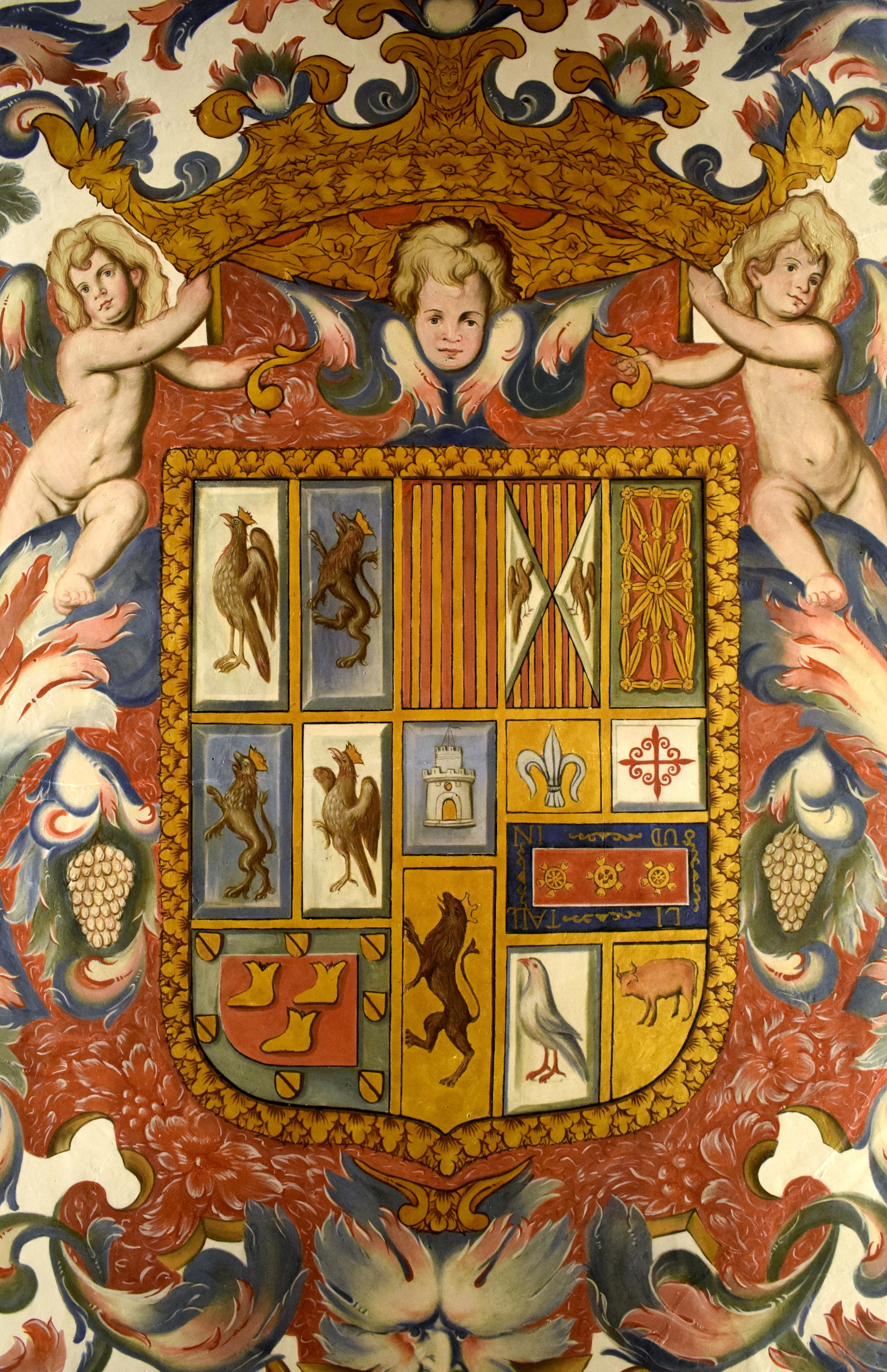
Shield of the Counts of Albaida at the chambers of counties, interior.

The palace is a lengthened structure of 252.62 feet long with a width varying from 19.02 to 63.64 feet, with four floors, three floors when seeing from the square. The first palace built in the late fifteenth century had already an aristocratic residence appearance and it was placed around the western tower, next to the main entrance of the walled enclosure.

The large façade opens up to the Major Square. Originally, it was not the main façade, but the southern lateral one. Due to the fact that the main façade is inside the parade ground, where only remains as a proof the Vileta's small square. The lateral access of the church is here. In its great façade, three symmetrical towers stand out, and there is a half pointed arcade between the western tower and the middle one. This arcade is made with ashlars, bricks, turned and plaster later. The second arcade leads to the façade of the church and to the medieval town. The façade was built in the 18th century. The second arch, placed between the middle and the eastern towers leads directly to the lobby of the palace. This is the latest one to be opened to the public, and can be dated back to the late 19th century, when the palace no longer belonged to the marquesses. The light comes directly through many windows and balconies that have been opened over time and show the different heights of the building. At the top of the façade is the emblematic gallery with Roman arches. The gallery section located between the middle tower and the east one, in renaissance style, opened from the chamber and was visible from the main square. It was demolished on 17 September 1997 and then rebuilt.

The building was built mainly with poor materials, such as taipa and masonry with later reforms with ashlar masonry and bricks. The building is a mixture of rustic style with gothic, and renaissance with baroque.

The building is connected to Santa Maria's church. At that time, a door of the main floor allowed passage from the marqui's bedroom to a private grandstand facing to the presbytery. During the baroque period it was common to connect palaces to churches, doing the liturgy a domestic thing, which can also be observed in other Valencian palaces, such as the Aguilar's palace in Alaquàs, another in Onil and the county palace in Cocentaina.

The palace preserves three coat of arms carved in stone, located outside: the oldest one dates from the 16th century, embedded under the balcony of the western tower representing the Milà's coat of arms. The other one is in the finished part in the 17th century, under a sundial, and it contains the coat of arms of Christopher II (which are Milà's, Aragon-Navarre's, Castile and León's, the Montesa order's...). The coat of arms appearing in the paintings of the throne room is very similar to the coat of arms of Christopher II, except from one thing: it also has the Mercader's coat of arms. The third blazon is located in the ancient parade ground, and includes a wide range of weapons. There is another Milà's coat of arms in the side door of the church, property of Christopher II.

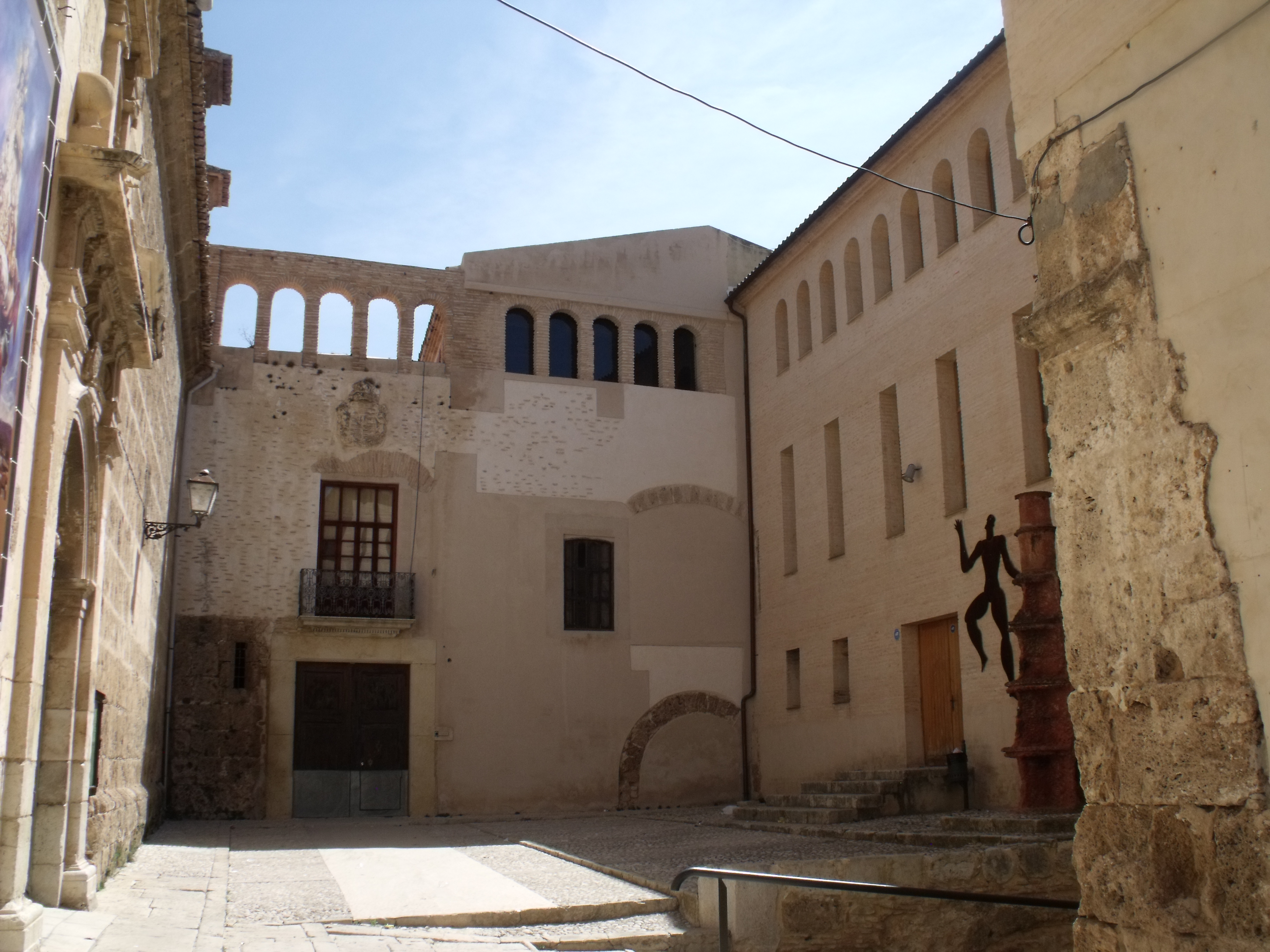

Inside the palace, strongly changed, the decorative conception established in the 18th century stands out, divided into winter and summer rooms. The former correspond to the mezzanine, with thick walls and small windows. The winter rooms correspond to the upper floor, where the main events took place, where balconies are opened to the square. The rooms in the tower and the east wing were decorated with a range of different colors for each level: red and ochre for the summer rooms; blue, green and indigo for the winter ones. These paintings were made by Bertomeu Albert in the 1690s, before moving to Orihuela. Of the summer themed rooms stand out: the hall, the tower, the big summer room, the entrance hall, the coat of arms room, and the corner room. In the main floor, the music room and the throne room (the most magnificent chamber), the white room, the marquis’ bedroom and the dressing room are the most important ones. The pictorial cycle designed by Bertomeu Albert is pagan themed with stylized floral patterns, figures of angels, demons, animals, monsters, humans, centaurs, and heraldic themes, everything with full baroque taste.

== Bibliography ==
- Soler i Molina, Albert (2001). Castells i Palaus de la Vall d'Albaida. Arquitectura i poder feudal (in Catalan). Ontinyent: Ajuntament d'Ontinyent, Mancomunitat de municipis de la Vall d'Albaida, Institut d'Estudis de la Vall d'Albaida, Caixa d'Estalvis d'Ontinyent. ISBN 84-95102-24-2.
