= Daniel Olcina =

Spanish footballer

Personal information
- Full name: Daniel Olcina Olcina
- Date of birth: 25 January 1989 (age 37)
- Place of birth: Albaida, Spain
- Height: 1.79 m (5 ft 10 in)
- Position: Winger

Youth career
- Valencia

Senior career*
Years	Team	Apps	(Gls)
2007–2011	Valencia B	65	(6)
2009–2011	Valencia	0	(0)
2010–2011	→ Alcoyano (loan)	24	(0)
2011–2013	Olímpic Xàtiva	7	(0)
2013–2014	Torpedo-BelAZ Zhodino	11	(0)
2014–2015	Benigànim	28	(8)
2015	Ontinyent	12	(5)
2016	Diriangén	14	(2)
2016–2018	Torre Levante	80	(14)
Total		241	(35)

International career
2006	Spain U17	1	(0)
- * Club domestic league appearances and goals

Daniel Olcina Olcina (born 25 January 1989) is a Spanish former footballer who played as a winger.

== Club career ==
Olcina was born in Albaida, Province of Valencia. A product of Valencia CF's youth system, he made his debut for the first team on 27 August 2009, when he came on as a substitute in a 4–1 home win against Stabæk Fotball in the play-off round of the UEFA Europa League.

Released by the Che in the summer of 2011 without any further competitive appearances, Olcina resumed his career in the lower leagues of his native region. He also had abroad spells in Belarus and Nicaragua, and later coached at an academy in Zunyi, China.
