= Segrelles Museum =

Art museum in Albaida, Spain

- Museu Segrelles
- Established: 1940–1943
- Location: Plaza Pintor Segrelles, 13 – Albaida (Province of Valencia), Spain
- Type: Art
- Website: Segrelles Museum

The Segrelles Museum, dedicated to the painter Josep Segrelles, is a culturale site in the city of Albaida, Province of Valencia, in Spain.

After living and working in Barcelona and New York, Segrelles decided to take up residence in his hometown in 1932. In 949, basing on designs made during his stay in the United States, he began to build what would later become his house-museum, where he lived and painted until his death on 3 March 1969.

This house-museum houses a large retrospective collection of the artist, from early works including family portraits, to his posthumous oil The Pentecost.

In the museum there are also illustrations for novels of Blasco Ibáñez, for Dante's Comedy, for passages in the fifth and ninth symphonies of Beethoven, for tales of The Thousand and One Nights and other authors such as Edgar Allan Poe, H. G. Wells, Miguel de Cervantes. It includes also other fantasies related to internal human anatomy and the "sidereal" subjects (astronomy), as well as religious themes.

== See also ==
- Josep Segrelles
- Route of the Valencian classics
