= Ducal Palace of Gandia =

Coordinates: 38.9658°N 0.1801°W

- Palau Ducal de Gandia (Spanish)
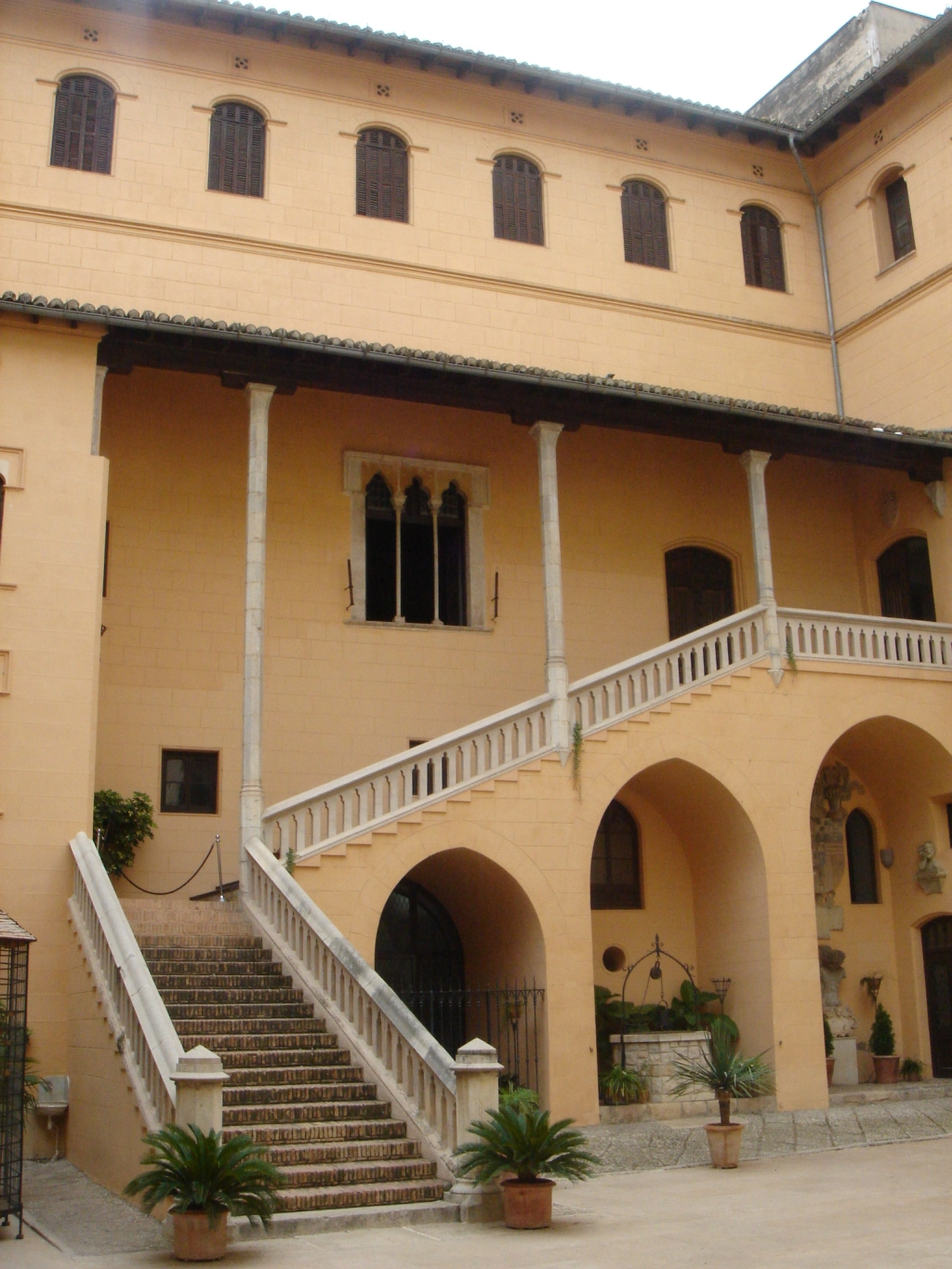
- Interactive map of Ducal Palace of Gandia
- Location: Gandia (Valencia)

History
- Built: Since 14th century

Site notes
- Architectural style: Valencian Gothic

Spanish Cultural Heritage
- Official name: Palau Ducal de Gandia
- Type: Non-movable
- Criteria: Monument
- Designated: 1931

The Ducal Palace of Gandia was, from the 14th century, the residence of the Royal Dukes of Gandía, and from 1485, the Borja family. It was the birthplace of Saint Francis Borja.

The oldest part of the building dates from the 15th century in Valencian Gothic style, but was restored and turned into a sanctuary by the Society of Jesus. It is attached to the wall that surrounds the city and has two gates, a Gothic one and one from the Renaissance.

Its interior has some interesting spaces, like the Golden Gallery, made in Baroque style, and the Crown Hall.

Initially the Palace was designed as a civil Gothic style urban castle and was ultimately transformed into a fortified palace. The main entrance to the Palacio Ducal is a robust door with a rounded arch, which together with the hallways are the oldest elements of the Gothic palace. When entering from this area there is an big central parade ground with an exterior staircase by which you ascend to the halls, among which the Baroque style Salón de Coronas and Galeria Dorada.

== Image gallery ==
The private oratory or chapel of the Borgia family (Oratorio de los Borja) inside the Ducal Palace of Gandia, featuring exquisite late-Gothic and Renaissance architectural details.

Interior view of the Golden Gallery (Galería Dorada) in the Ducal Palace of Gandia, showcasing its ornate Baroque decoration, gilded details, and painted ceilings.

Exterior view or architectural detail of the Golden Gallery wing of the Ducal Palace of Gandia.

The heraldic coat of arms of the Borgia (Borja) family carved in stone on a wall of the Ducal Palace of Gandia.

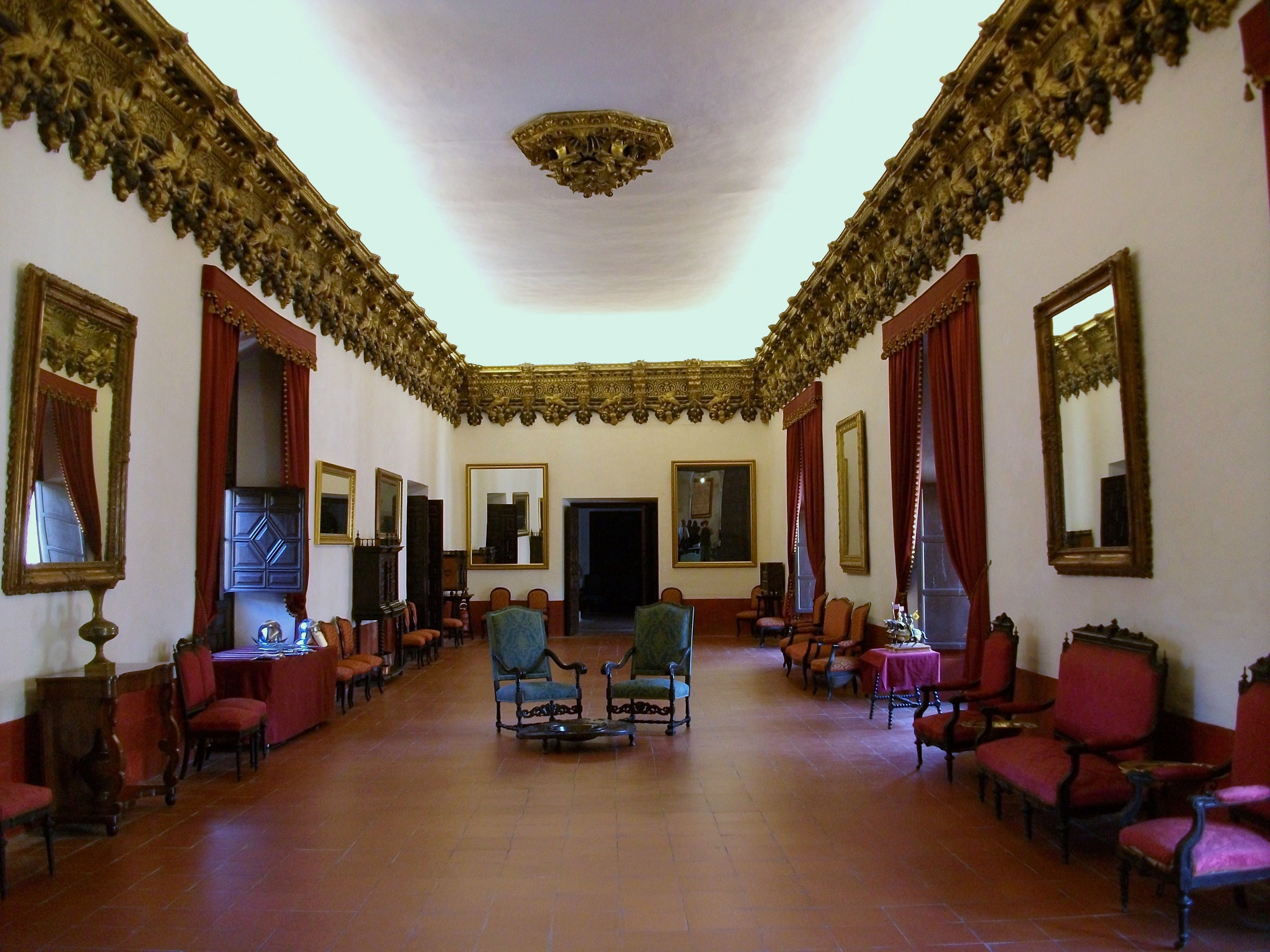
The Hall of the Eagles (Sala de les Àguiles), also known as the main salon, in the Ducal Palace of Gandia, featuring Renaissance styling and tiled flooring.

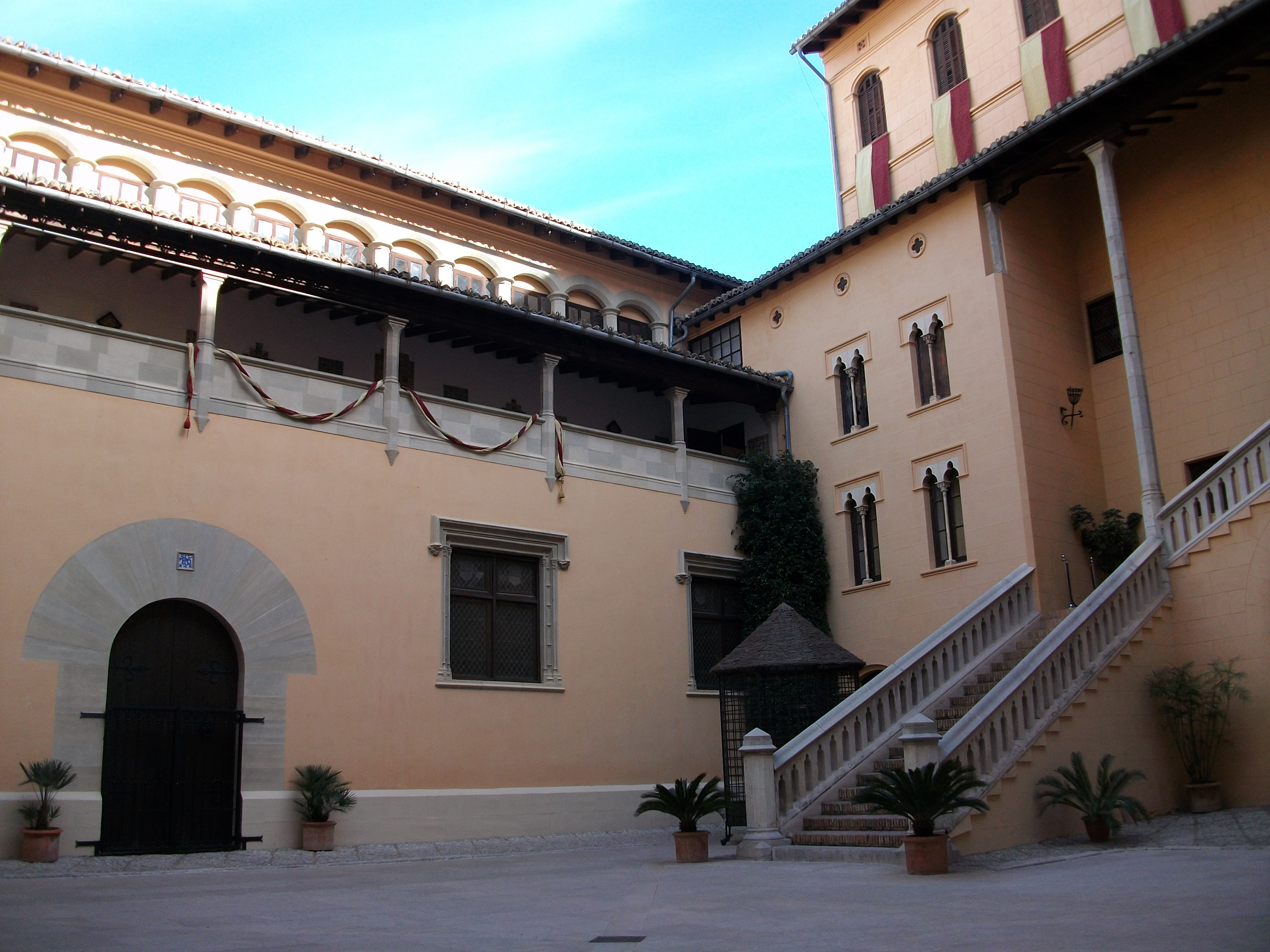
View of the central interior courtyard (patio) of the Ducal Palace of Gandia, highlighting its Valencian Gothic architecture and staircase.

== See also ==
- House of Borgia
- Duke of Gandia
- List of Jesuit sites
- Monastery of Sant Jeroni de Cotalba
- Route of the Borgias
- Route of the Valencian classics

== Bibliography ==
- Soler Salcedo, Juan Miguel (2008). Nobleza Española: grandeza inmemorial 1520. Visión Libros ISBN 8498861799.
