= Collegiate Basilica of Xàtiva =

Church in Xàtiva, Spain

Collegiate of Santa María of Xàtiva
- Collegiate of Santa María of Xàtiva
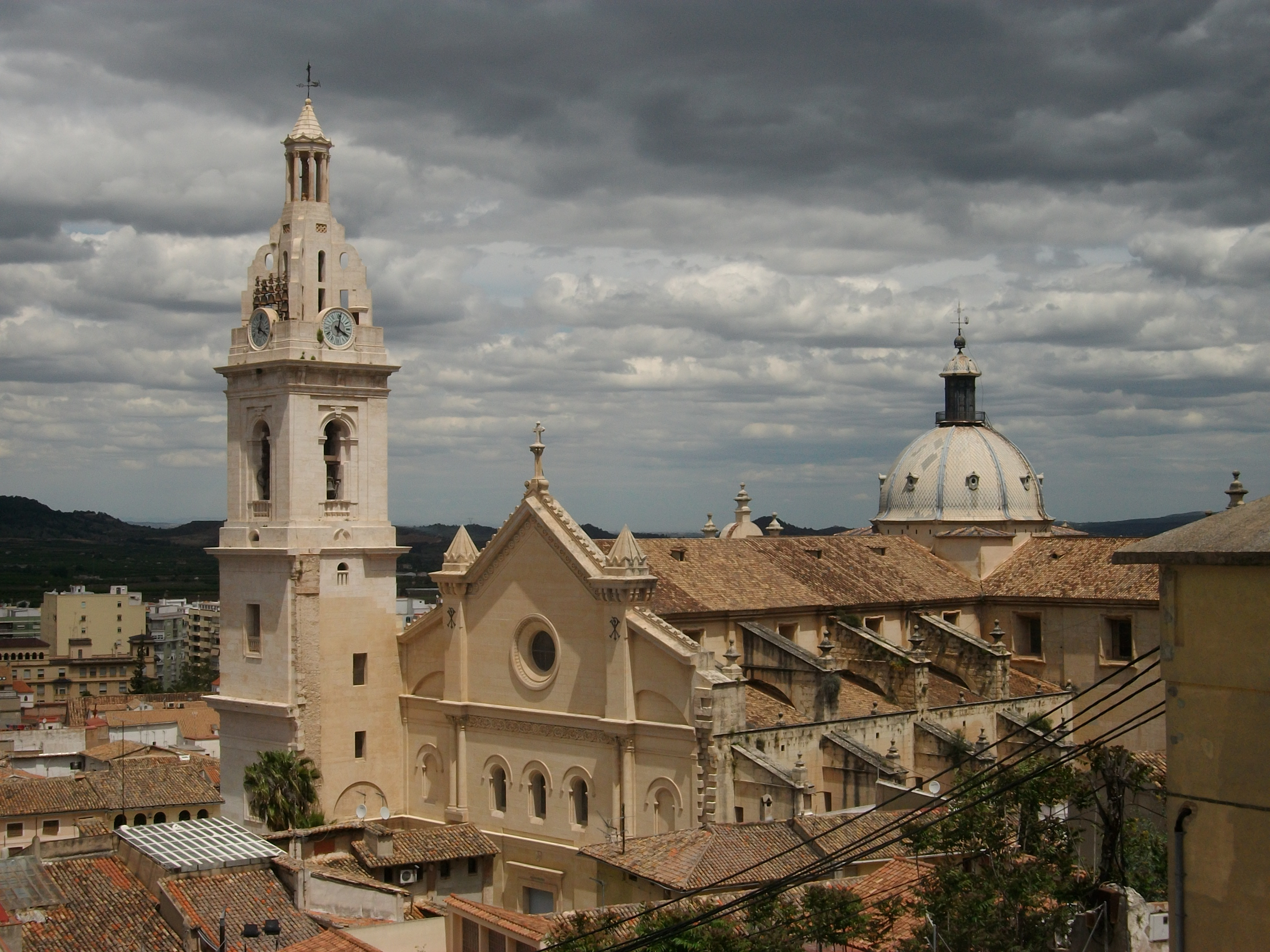
- Collegiate Basilica of Xàtiva
- Collegiate of Santa María of Xàtiva
- 38°59′17.05″N 0°31′5.68″W
- Location: Xàtiva (Valencia)
- Country: Spain
- Denomination: Roman Catholic
- Website: http://www.seudexativa.org

Architecture
- Style: Renaissance, baroque
- Years built: 1596

Administration
- Diocese: Valencia

The Collegiate Basilica of Santa Maria of Xàtiva, also known as La Seu, is the principal church of the city of Xàtiva (Valencia), Spain. The construction commenced in 1596.

In this Collegiate Basilica of Xàtiva different members of the House of Borgia are buried. At the museum is possible to see the altarpiece of the cardinal Alfonso Borgia and a silver chalice with the name of the Pope Calixtus III and another artworks of the Borgia family.

== See also ==
- Route of the Borgias
