= Archaeological Museum of Gandia =

- Museu Arqueològic de Gandia
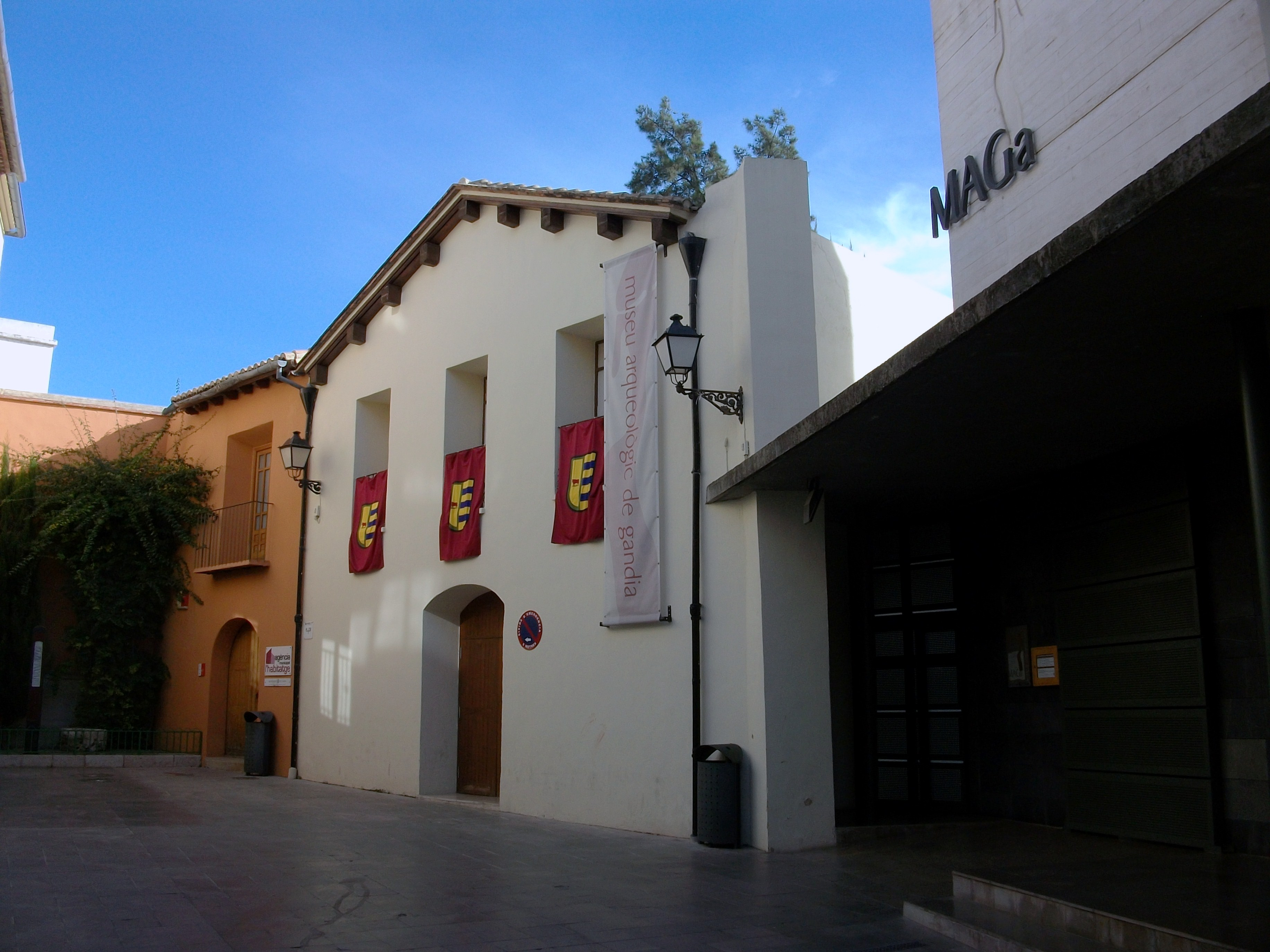
- Established: 1972
- Location: Hospital 18 - Gandia (Valencia), Spain
- Coordinates: 38°58′01″N 0°10′40″W
- Type: Archaeological
- Website: Website of the Archaeological Museum of Gandia

The Archaeological Museum of Gandia showcases the archaeological heritage of La Safor and Gandia, Spain, and particularly of the Parpalló cave.

In 1972, in collaboration with Diputación de Valencia, the museum was officially inaugurated. Now known by the acronym Maga, it is located in the old building of the Sant Marc Hospital, in the south-east end of the medieval walls of Gandia, on the left bank of the river Serpis.

The museum was closed to the public from 1987 to 2003 while research, documentation and restoration of the museum's collections took place. It has a permanent exhibition on regional prehistory, from the first inhabitants of the Paleolithic to the Iron Age.

The museum houses artifacts from some of the main archaeological sites of Europe, such as the Cueva de Bolomor, the Parpalló cave and the Maravillas cave.

== See also ==
- Route of the Borgias
- Route of the Valencian classics
