= Palace of the Counts of Cocentaina =

- Palau Comtal de Cocentaina (Catalan)
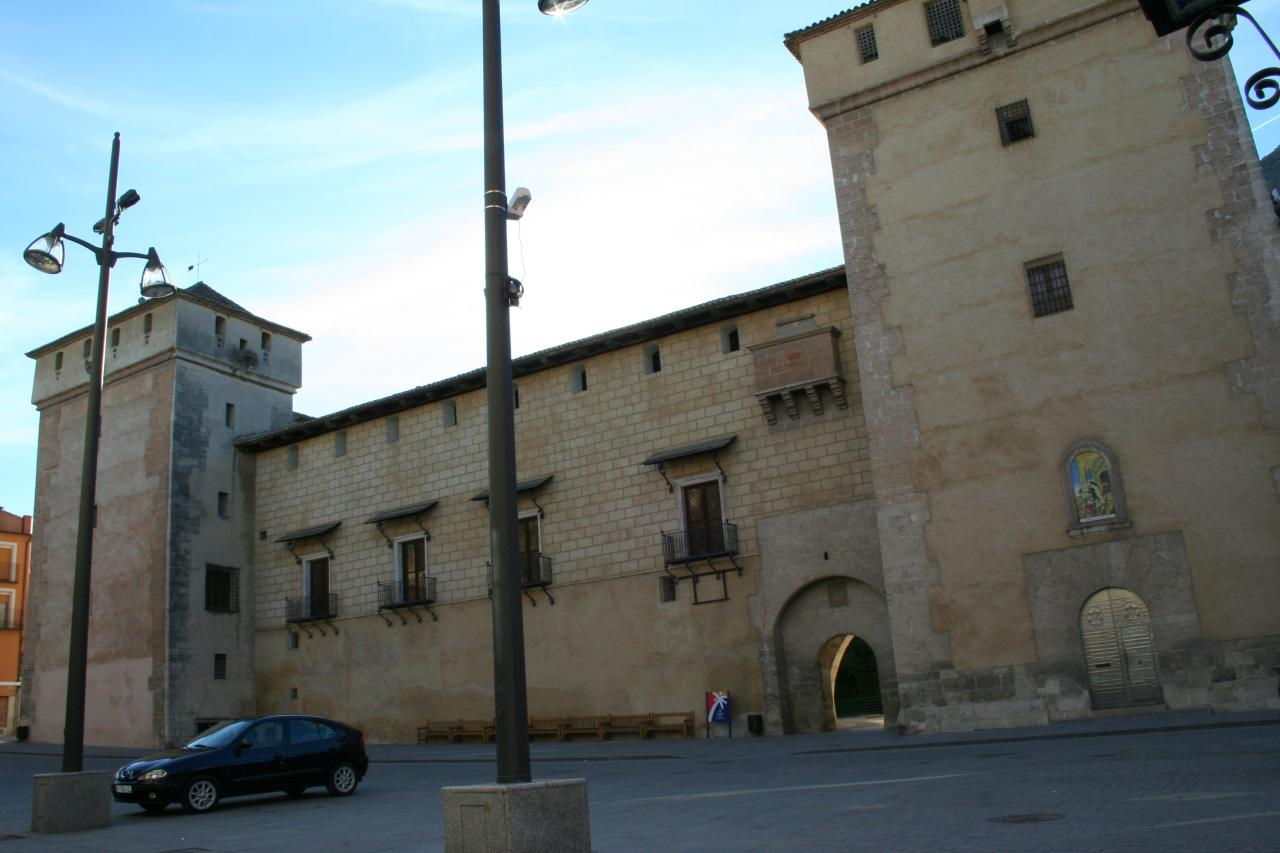

- Location within Spain
- 38.743333°N 0.440833°W
- Location: Cocentaina, Valencian Community

Site notes
- Architectural style: XIV

Spanish Cultural Heritage
- Official name: Palau Comtal de Cocentaina
- Type: Non-movable
- Criteria: Monument

The Palace of the Counts of Cocentaina, located in the municipality of Cocentaina, Alicante, Spain, is a 14th-century medieval building. This building originated as an old fortress with four halls and four towers on donjons crowned by merlons.

The art gallery of the palace shows works with artistic value such as the gothic altarpiece of Saint Barbara or the altarpiece of Saint Anthony by Nicolás Borrás and a sacred Bible from the 15th century.

== Bibliography ==
- Guía de Arquitectura de la Provincia de Alicante. ISBN 84-7784-353-8
- PAREDES VAÑÓ, Enric (2011), "Aproximación a la arquitectura de las fortificaciones en las montañas del valle central del Serpis. Las Torres". Actas del Séptimo Congreso Nacional de Historia de la Construcción. Instituto Juan de Herrera - Madrid - 2011. ISBN 978-84-9728-370-0 | 2 vols., 146 comunicaciones, 1507 pp.

== See also ==
- Route of the Valencian classics
