= Collegiate Basilica of Gandia =

Church in Gandia, Spain

Collegiate of Santa María
- Colegiata de Santa María de Gandia
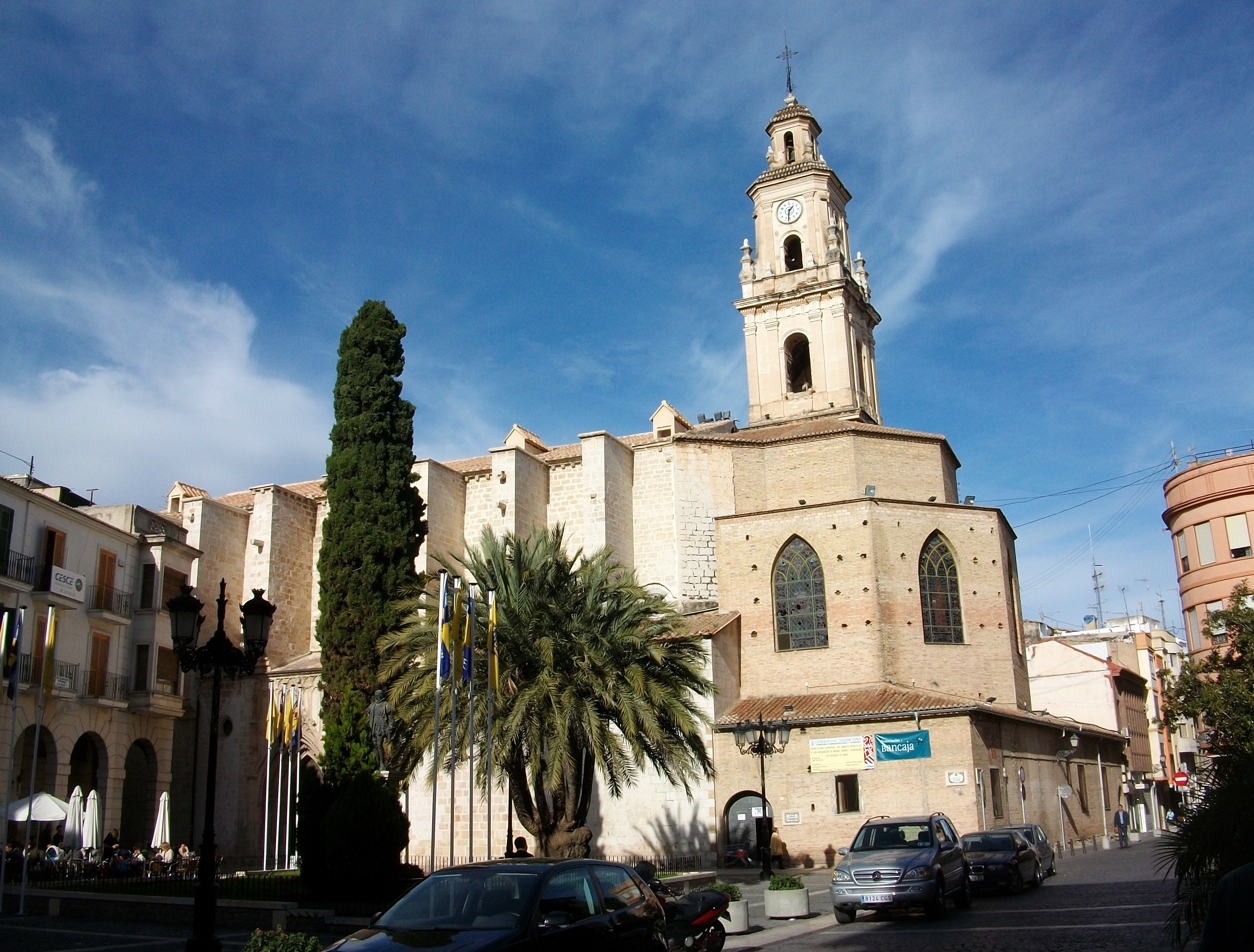
- Collegiate Basilica of Gandia
- Collegiate of Santa María
- 38°58′1.07″N 0°10′48.84″W
- Location: Gandia (Valencia)
- Country: Spain
- Denomination: Roman Catholic
- Website: http://www.colegiatagandia.org

History
- Founded: October 26, 1499

Architecture
- Style: Valencian Gothic
- Years built: October 26, 1499

Administration
- Diocese: Valencia

The Collegiate Basilica of Santa Maria of Gandia, also known as "La Seu", is the principal church of the city of Gandia, (Valencia). Construction commenced in the 14th century.

The Collegiate Church of Santa María is a Valencian Gothic construction, located in the centre Gandia. Construction began in the 14th century and finalised two centuries later. Thanks to Pope Alexander VI, the temple was raised to the category of Collegiate. It was declared a National Historic Monument in 1931.

The church consists of one central nave with lateral chapels adjacent to the walls. Its austere architectural style was once supplemented with rich interior decorations of altarpieces, paintings and sculptures, which disappeared during the Spanish Civil War.

The Seo of Gandia is in itself a small architectural jewel, where the Puerta Sur or the Puerta de Santa María and the Puerta de los Apóstoles are noteworthy, one of the first works of Damián Forment, precursor of the Spanish Renaissance.

== See also ==
- Monastery of Sant Jeroni de Cotalba
- Route of the Borgias
- Route of the Valencian classics
