= Albaida =

- Municipality
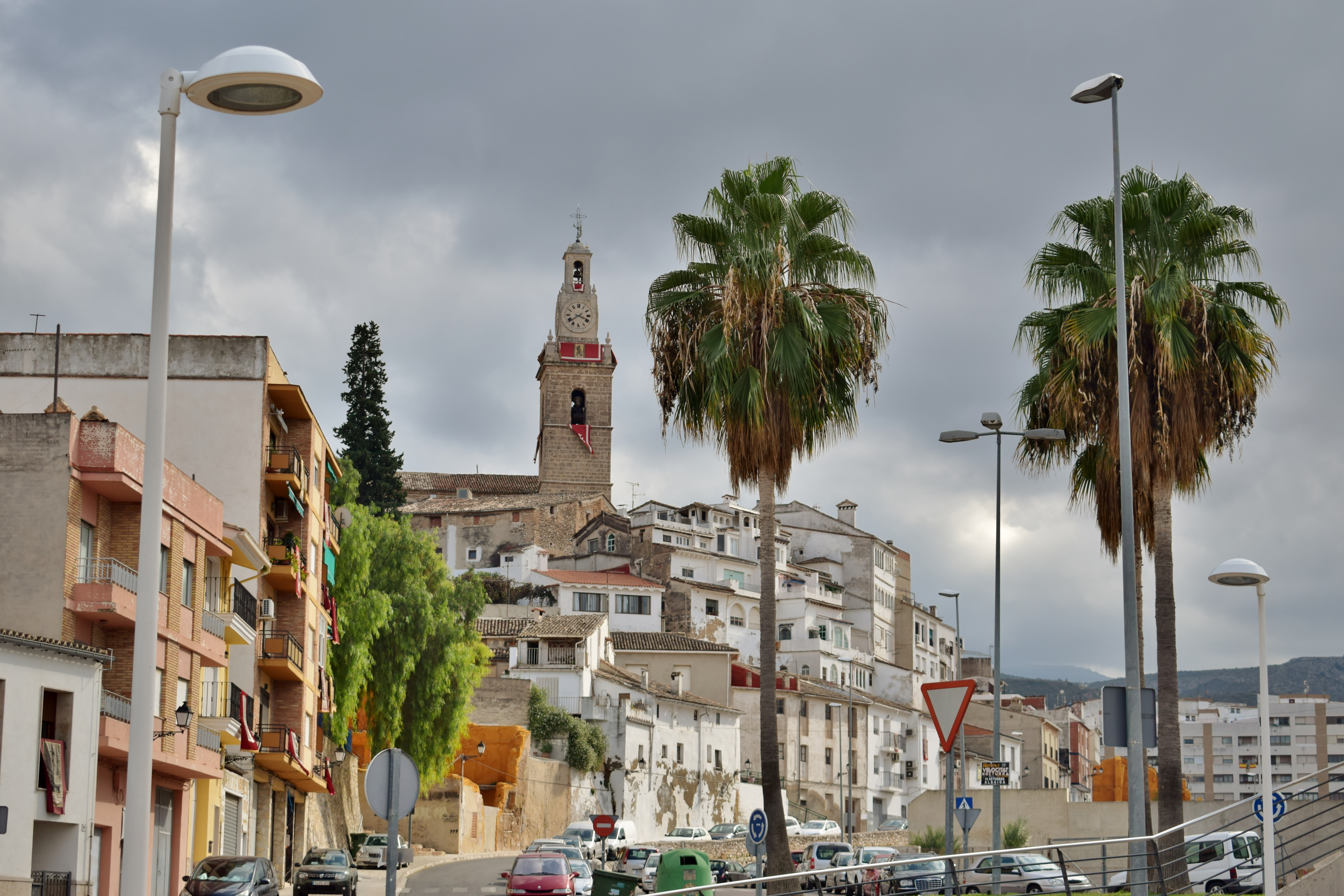

- Coat of arms

- Location in Spain
- Coordinates: 38°50′13″N 0°30′56″W
- Country: Spain
- Autonomous community: Valencian Community
- Province: Valencia
- Comarca: Vall d'Albaida
- Judicial district: Ontinyent

Government
  - Alcalde: Josep Antoni Albert i Quilis (2015 ) (Bloc Albaida)

Area
  - Total: 35.41 km^{2} (13.67 sq mi)
- Elevation: 315 m (1,033 ft)

Population (2025-01-01)
  - Total: 6,322
  - Density: 178.5/km^{2} (462.4/sq mi)
- Demonyms: Albaidí, albaidina
- Time zone: UTC+1 (CET)
  - Summer (DST): UTC+2 (CEST)
- Postal code: 46860
- Official language(s): Valencian
- Website: Official website

Albaida is a municipality in the comarca of Vall d'Albaida in the Valencian Community, Spain.

== Main sights ==
- Palace of Milà i Aragó
- Segrelles Museum
- Route of the Borgias
- Route of the Valencian classics

== Notable people ==
- José Segrelles, painter and illustrator
- Daniel Olcina, footballer

== See also ==
- List of municipalities in Valencia
