= Cocentaina =

- Municipality
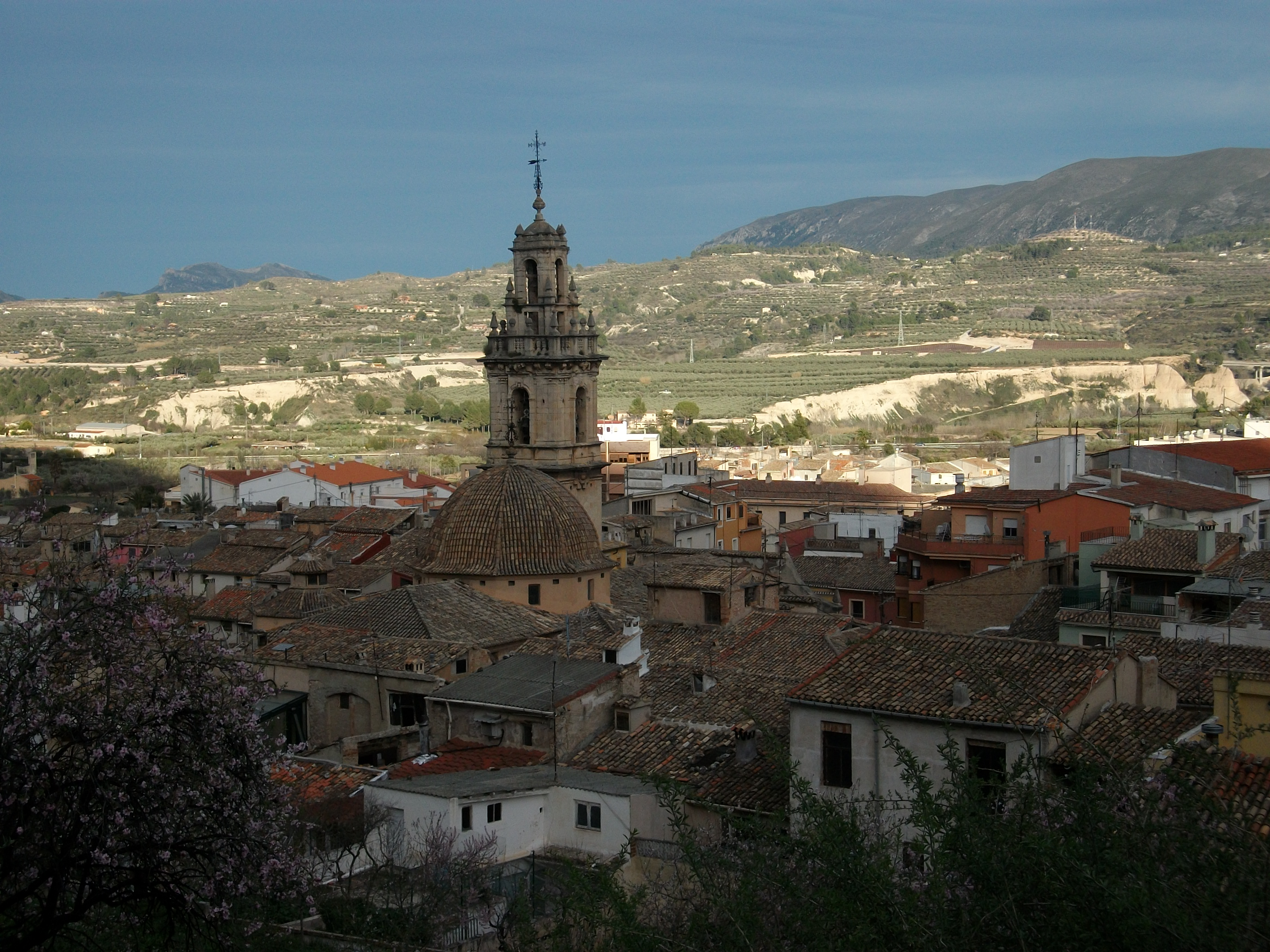

- Coat of arms

- Location in the Province of Alicante Location in the Valencian Community Location in Spain
- Coordinates: 38°44′42″N 0°26′26″W
- Country: Spain
- Autonomous community: Valencian Community
- Province: Alicante
- Comarca: Comtat
- Judicial district: Cocentaina

Government
  - Mayor: Mireia Estepa Olcina (PSPV-PSOE)

Area
  - Total: 52.94 km^{2} (20.44 sq mi)
- Elevation: 430 m (1,410 ft)

Population (2025-01-01)
  - Total: 11,498
  - Density: 217.2/km^{2} (562.5/sq mi)
- Demonym(s): contestà, -ana (Val.) contestano, -a (Sp.)
- Time zone: UTC+1 (CET)
  - Summer (DST): UTC+2 (CEST)
- Postal code: 03820
- Official language(s): Valencian; Spanish
- Website: Official website

Cocentaina (Valencian: [kosenˈtajna]; Spanish: [koθenˈtajna]) is a locality and municipality in the comarca of Comtat, in the province of Alicante, Spain. The village is located between the mountainous Serra de Mariola national park and the Serpis river. Cocentaina is conveniently situated for both road and mountain biking. Many of the roads are used for training by professional teams (Astana have been seen regularly), and several roads have been used by the Vuelta a España.

The economy of Cocentaina is chiefly based on the textile industry.

== Main sights ==
The most important monuments in Cocentaina are the convents of the orders of Saint Clare (from the 16th century) and Saint Francis, the Catholic church of L'Assumpció and the Palace of the Counts of Cocentaina.

- Palace of the Counts of Cocentaina
- Cocentaina Castle
- Route of the Valencian classics
- Serra Mariola Natural Park

== Events ==
The Moros i cristians festival and the Fira de Tots Sants ("All Saints Fair") of Cocentaina attracts many tourists each year. The Moros i Cristians festival is dated in 1586.

== People ==
- David Belda, cyclist
- Nicolás Borrás, a Spanish Renaissance painter and monk of the Monastery of Sant Jeroni de Cotalba.
- Timoteo Briet Montaud, art nouveau architech.
- Natxo Insa, footballer
- José Luis Moltó, Spanish volleyball player
- Lucas Torró, footballer
- Rafael Valls, cyclist
