= José Segrelles =

Spanish painter (1885–1969)

- Born: José Segrelles y Albert; 18 March 1885; Albaida (Valencia), Spain
- Died: 3 March 1969 (aged 83); Albaida (Valencia), Spain
- Education: Saint Charles Royal Academy of Fine Arts of Valencia
- Known for: Painter
- Movement: Orientalist

José Segrelles Albert (18 March 1885 – 3 March 1969) was a Spanish painter and illustrator. He was the uncle of cartoonists and painters Eustaquio and Vicente Segrelles.

== Biography ==
Segrelles was born in Albaida, Valencia province, in 1885. He studied in the Saint Charles Royal Academy of Fine Arts of Valencia and at Escola de la Llotja in Barcelona. His first job was in a photography studio, working with illumination.

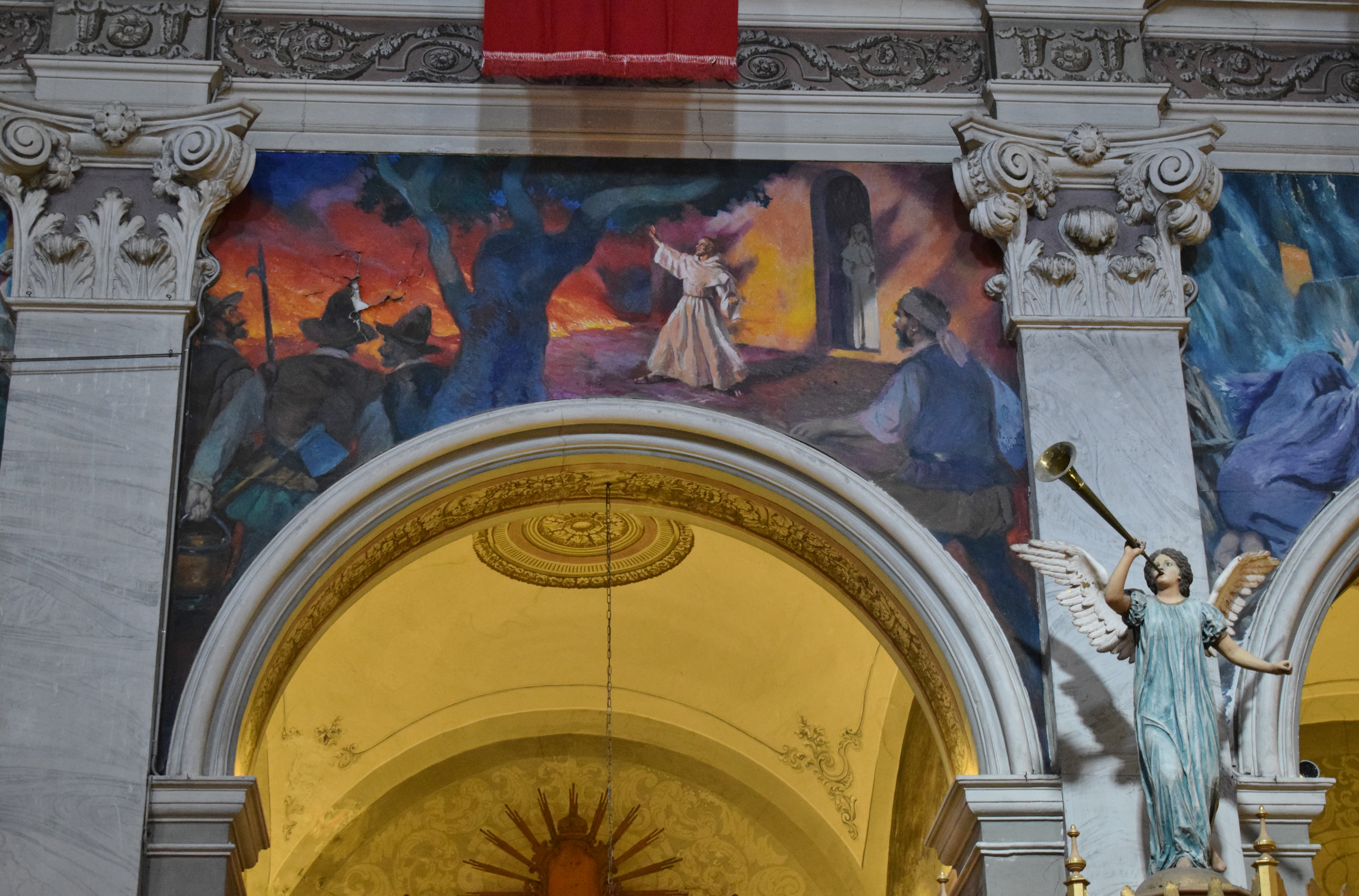
Design by Segrelles for a church

In 1926, already established as an artist in Spain, Segrelles received his first English lessons, foreseeing a possible departure to England. That same year, he made an exhibition in London that was poorly received, but on 8 September 1926 he received an offer from the British magazines The Illustrated London News and The Sketch. Due to his later work appearances in The Sketch, Segrelles received offers from the Scandinavian press. He published in The Illustrated London News's Christmas special in 1927, being a regular contributor in the Christmas specials until 1934.

In 1927 he established contacts with the American publishing industry, and received an offer the following year. Segrelles relocated to the Upper West Side, New York City in October 1928. His first job was for Redbook magazine, and he would work also for The Cosmopolitan. In 1930 he staged his first art exhibition. By this time, Cosmopolitan was one of the most popular magazines in the United States, showcasing Segrelles' work alongside other illustrators such as James Montgomery Flagg. In 1930, Segrelles met Joanne Cummings, Miss Cummings, who became his model and muse.

In 1931, Segrelles exhibited at International Art Center Roerich Museum. The U.S. press coined the term Blue Segrelles referring to his dark palette. The term was a comparison to Maxfield Parrish's Blue Parrish.

He died in his hometown of Albaida in 1969.

== See also ==
- List of Orientalist artists
- Orientalism
- Segrelles Museum
- Vicente Segrelles

== Sources ==
- Cuadrado, Jesús (2000). Atlas español de la cultura popular: De la historieta y su uso, 1873-2000. Madrid: Ediciones Sinsentido/Fundación Germán Sánchez Ruipérez. 2 v. ISBN 84-89384-23-1.
- Ferrer Álvarez, Mireia (2016). Segrelles. Un pintor valenciano en Nueva York. 1929-1932. Valencia: Institució Alfons el Magnànim. p. 125. ISBN 9788478226894.
