= Lady (disambiguation) =

A lady is a term for a woman, the counterpart of "lord" or "gentleman".

Lady or Ladies may also refer to:

== People ==
- First Lady, wife of a head of state
- Lady (American rapper) (Shameka Shanta Brown; born 1989)
- Lady Bardales (born 1982), Peruvian police officer
- Lady Bird Johnson, first lady of the United States from 1963 to 1969 as the wife of then president, Lyndon B. Johnson
- Lady Gaga (born 1986), American singer
- Lady Grooms (born 1992), American basketball player
- Robert Seldon Lady (born 1954), CIA agent, involved in Abu Omar rendition/kidnaping
- Lady Howard Mabuza, Eswatini politician
- Wendell Lady (1930–2022), American politician

== Places ==
=== Poland ===
- Lady, Podlaskie Voivodeship
- Lądy, Pomeranian Voivodeship
- Łady, Pruszków County
- Łady, Sochaczew County

== Songs ==
- "Lady" (Brett Young song), 2020
- "Lady" (D'Angelo song), 1996
- "Lady" (Dennis Wilson song), 1970
- "Lady" (EXID song)
- "Lady" (Jack Jones song), 1967
- "Lady" (Kenny Rogers song), written by Lionel Richie, 1980
- "Lady" (Lenny Kravitz song), 2004
- "Lady" (Little River Band song), 1978
- "Lady" (Stevie Nicks song)
- "Lady" (Sangiovanni song), 2021
- "Lady" (Styx song), 1973
- "Lady (Hear Me Tonight)", a 2000 house song by Modjo
- "Lady (You Bring Me Up)", a 1981 song by the Commodores
- "Lady", a song by England Dan & John Ford Coley from Nights Are Forever
- "Lady", a song by Brotherhood of Man from Good Things Happening
- "Lady", a song by Chromatics from Kill for Love
- "Lady", a song by CNBLUE from What Turns You On?
- "Lady", a song by David Coverdale from White Snake
- "Lady", a song by Fela Kuti from Shakara
- "Lady", a song by Gino Vannelli from Powerful People
- "Lady", a song by Supertramp from Crisis? What Crisis?
- "Lady", a song by Simply Red from Stay
- "Lady", a song by Kenshi Yonezu from Lost Corner
- "Ladies" (song), a 2003 song by Sarai
- "Ladies", a song by Inna from the album Hot
- "Ladies", a 2009 song by Lee Fields
- "Lady", a 2018 song by Kim Yu-bin

== Other uses ==
- Lady (sculpture), an outdoor sculpture by Jan Zach
- Lady!!, a Japanese shōjo manga
- Lady, a fictional character in Lady and the Tramp
- LADY, alternative name for an N battery
- Lady (Devil May Cry), a character in the Devil May Cry video game series
- "The Ladies", a euphemism for the women's bathroom
- Ladies, a Cambodian women's magazine
- Lady (group), South Korean transgender pop group
- Lady apple, a cultivar also referred to as just "Lady".
- Lady Rainicorn, a character who is Jake the Dog’s girlfriend in the animated series Adventure Time
- The Lady (web series), an Italian web series
- Lady (2025 film), British satirical mockumentary film
- Lady (2026 film), a Nigerian–British drama film
- Lady (Jack Jones album), 1967
- Lady (Styx album), 1998

== See also ==
- A Lady (disambiguation)
- Gentlewoman (disambiguation)
- Lady of the House (disambiguation)
- Milady (disambiguation), also M'Lady
- Our Lady (disambiguation)
- The Lady (disambiguation)
