= Pere March =

Valencian poet

- Born: c. 1336-1338; Valencia, Kingdom of Valencia
- Died: 7 June 1413 (aged 74–77); Balaguer, Spain
- Resting place: Monastery of Sant Jeroni de Cotalba, Alfauir
- Occupation: poet
- Children: Ausiàs March
- Writing career
- Language: Catalan

Pere March (c. 1336-1338 — 7 June 1413) was a Valencian poet. He was the father of Ausiàs March and the uncle of Arnau March.

Pere's family had been lawyers and officers of the court of the Crown of Aragon. Born in Valencia, he was seemingly the younger brother of Jaume March II, and the family's possessions around Barcelona passed to Jaume.

Pere served at the court of the younger brother of King Alfonso IV, Peter, seneschal of Catalonia, and then at the court of Peter's son Alfonso, Duke of Gandia, and of Alfonso's son Alfonso. He undertook several important diplomatic missions, travelling to England for the first Alfonso twice in the 1380s, and then working for the second during the interregnum following the death of King Martin I. For his services, Pere was knighted.

After his death at Balaguer in 1413, his body was moved and buried in the Monastery of Sant Jeroni de Cotalba, in Alfahuir, (Valencia).

Along with verses he wrote together with Jaume, three major poems by Pere March survive:

- El mal d'amor
- L'arnés del cavaller
- Lo compte final
