= Arnau March =

Provenço-Catalan poet and knight

Arnau March (fl. c. 1410 – c. 1430) was a Provenço-Catalan knight and poet of the famous March family. He was related—it is unknown how—to Jaume I, Jaume II, Pere, and Ausiàs March. He bore the rank of mossèn ("milord"). He was active during the life and consortship of Margarida de Prades (queen 1409, nun 1424, dead 1430), to whom he addressed one poem, and before the compilation of the Cançoner Vega-Aguiló (1420–30), which contains three of his poems. In total, he has left only six pieces of verse. His dates suggest that he came a generation or two after the brothers Jaume II and Pere and one before Ausiàs. He may have been a nephew of the former and cousin of the latter, but it cannot be proved.

Arnau's work can be divided into three types: his three religious and three amorous pieces, and a single fragment preserved in part by Pere Torroella. His religious masterpiece is the Visió de la Verge Maria ("Vision of the Virgin Mary") which, in a solemn and pious tone, heaps praise on the Virgin Mary, the angels, Apostles, martyrs, and virgins. Its final tornada makes reference to mercès a vós demana ("thanks to your pleading"), which may be an allusion to the local cult of Barcelona for Mary Mother of Mercy.

Arnau's Qui parà dir lo misteri ten alt is a gloss on the Annunciation as described in the Gospel of Luke, 1:31–38. The wording of this narrative poem is both scholastic and emotional. The Latin Vulgate translation of Luke is provided as a refrain after each verse: Ecce ancilla Domini; fiat mihi secundum verbum tuum! ("Behold the handmaid of the Lord; be it unto me according to thy word" in the KJV). Arnau's final religious poem, Un novell fruyt, exit de la rabaça, is a gloss on the Nativity as described in the first chapter of the Gospel of John. In it the scholasticism completely overtakes the traditional lyrical treatment of its subject.

Just as his religious poems fall completely within the scholastic tradition, so Arnau March's love poems fall completely within the courtly love tradition of the troubadours. His poetic style is similar in his religious and courtly verses: elegant, delicate, and emotive. Si m'havets tolt, Amor, del tot lo sen, is a planh (lament) of the duress of a lady in love. In Novelh penser m'és vengutz soptamén Arnau questions whether a woman would actually believe the calumny raised against the service of love. Arnau's most famous love song is the Cançó d'amor tençonada, which is phrased as a debate (tenso) between Wisdom and the Heart. The tension between the demands of these two domains was a constant theme in contemporary lyric poetry. The debate, in March, is unresolved, but according to its rubric it was submitted for adjudication to senyora reyna dona Margarida (Queen Margarida), but no further verses were added.
