= Milady =

Milady (from my lady) is a term of address for a noble woman, the feminine form of milord.

Milady, M'Lady, or similar, may also refer to:

== Fictional characters ==
- Milady de Winter, fictional character in the novel The Three Musketeers
- Milady, fictional character in the Italian animated television series 44 Cats
- Milady, fictional character in the Italian comic series Milady 3000

== Other uses ==
- Milady (given name)
- Milady Tack-Fang (born 1949), Cuban fencer
- The Milady Handicap, an American thoroughbred race horse race
- Milady, a 1923 French drama film directed by Henri Diamant-Berger
- M'Lady (play), a 1921 British play by Edgar Wallace
- "M'Lady" (Sly and the Family Stone song), a 1968 song by Sly & the Family Stone
- M'Lady, a 1974 album by Australian artist Colleen Hewett
- "My Lady" (Exo song), a 2013 song by Exo off the album XOXO

== See also ==
- "Panagia mou, panagia mou" (Greek: Παναγιά μου, Παναγιά μου, lit. 'My Lady, My Lady'), 1976 song by Mariza Koch
- Milord (disambiguation)
- Lady (disambiguation)
- MY (disambiguation)
- Mi (disambiguation)
