= Milord (disambiguation) =

Milord (also m'lord, from my lord) is a manner of address to a nobleman, the masculine form of milady. (my lady, also m'lady)

Milord or M'Lord or My Lord or similar, may also refer to:

== Music ==
- "Milord" (song), a 1958 song by Georges Moustaki and Marguerite Monnot and Ernst Bader, sung by Édith Piaf
- Milord (album), a 1960 album by Dalida, containing the eponymous 1958 song
- Les Milords, a 1960s band founded by Jean-Pierre Massiera
- M'Lords, a 1960s band which contained Peter Gabriel

== Other uses ==
- Roland Milord, a silver medalist in wrestling at the 1950 British Empire Games
- Milord (vehicle), a type of vehicle, a variant of the convertible
- Mylord (coach), a type of horse drawn coach
- MILORD, a fictional WWII resistance organization from the Norwegian TV show Brødrene Dal
- My Lord (film), a 2026 Indian film
- Milord (horse), Indonesian racehorse (2022 – 2025)

== See also ==
- Milady (disambiguation)
