= Antonio Sancho de Benevento =

- Born: Benevento, Pontifical States
- Died: 16th century Monastery of Sant Jeroni de Cotalba, Alfauir, Spain
- Known for: Silversmith artist
- Movement: Spanish Renaissance

Friar Antonio Sancho de Benevento (Benevento, Pontifical States - Alfauir, Kingdom of Valencia, 16th century), was a silversmith artist of the Spanish Renaissance and monk of the Monastery of Sant Jeroni de Cotalba, near Gandia (Valencia).

== Works ==
His most remarkable work was the monstrance of the Monastery of Sant Jeroni de Cotalba in 1548, considered one of the best in Spain by the experts. It measured one meter in height and took seven years to finish it. It was a piece in tower form with numerous images with great detail. His quality and his technique was comparable to the monstrances of the Toledo Cathedral or the Santiago de Compostela Cathedral, being one of the best examples of the Spanish Renaissance gold work. The monstrance went to the Collegiate Basilica of Gandia after the Ecclesiastical Confiscations of Mendizábal. It was exhibited in the Barcelona International Exposition in 1929. It disappeared during the Spanish Civil War.

Friar Antonio Sancho de Benevento made other artworks such as reliquaries, goldsmith and images of the Virgin Mary and Saint Jerome, all of them are missing today.

== Bibliography ==
- Mateo Gómez, Isabel, López-Yarto, Amelia y Prados García, José María, El arte de la Orden Jerónima: historia y mecenazgo, Madrid, Encuentro, 2000, ISBN 978-84-7490-552-6 pp. 294.

== See also ==
- Monastery of Sant Jeroni de Cotalba
- Hieronymites
