= Pere Compte =

Catalan architect

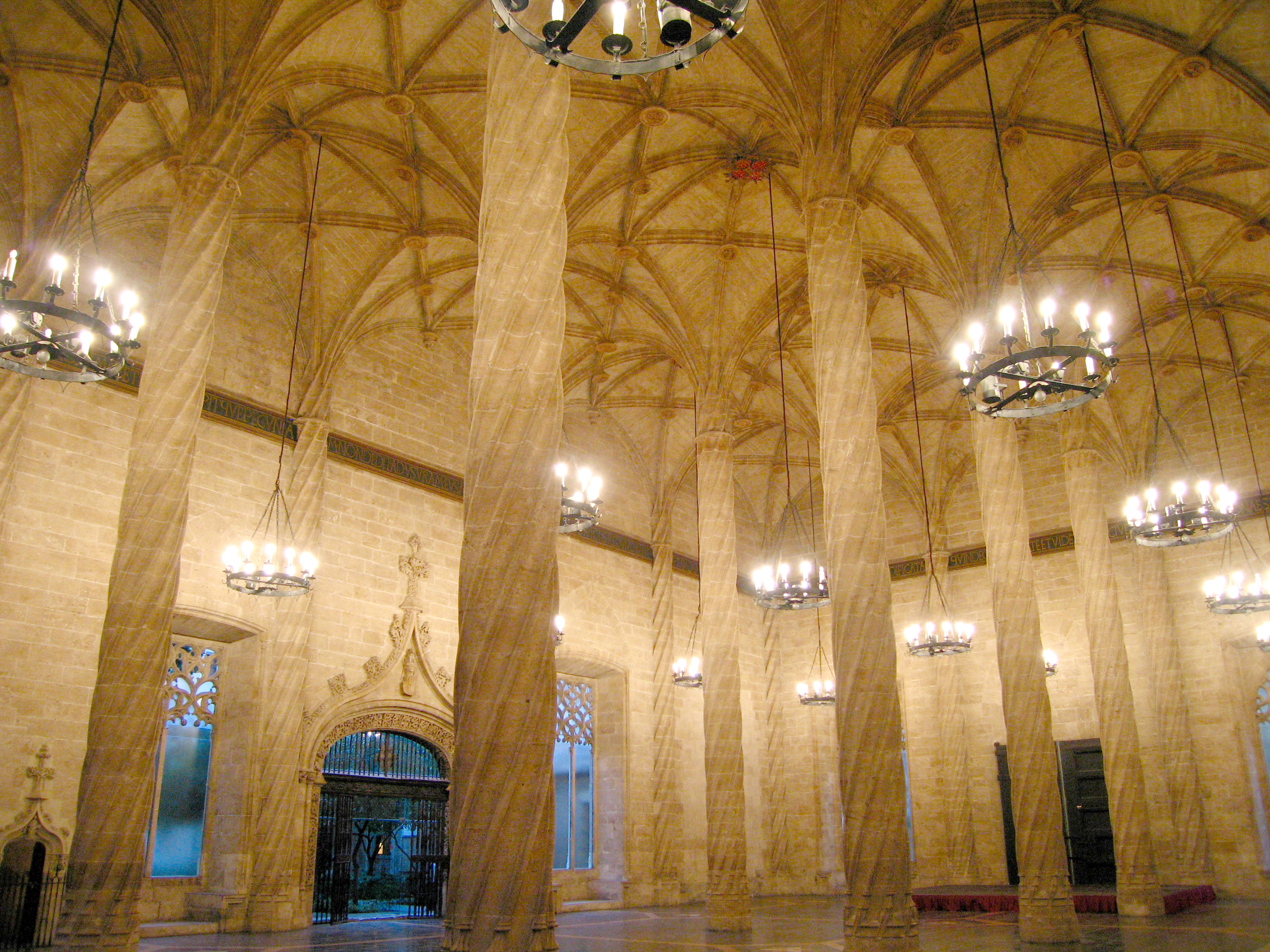
- Hall of the Columns in the Llotja de la Seda, Valencia.
- Born: Girona
- Died: 1506; Valencia
- Occupation: Architect
- Buildings: Llotja de la Seda, Valencia Cathedral, Orihuela Cathedral, Monastery of Sant Jeroni de Cotalba, Collegiate Basilica of Gandia, Tortosa Cathedral

Pere Comte (also spelled Pere Compte; died 1506) was a catalan architect from Girona. He was one of the main Gothic architects of the Crown of Aragon of the period, and in particular in Valencia, where he directed the construction of numerous palaces. Pere Compte is considered a master of the Valencian Gothic art.

Comte's works include the Convent of St. Dominic (1454–1457), together with Francesc Baldomar, the restoration of the Torres de Quart (1468), a chapel in the church of Sant Nicolau (1476), the crossing of the Cathedral of Orihuela.

He also directed or created the works of other important buildings as the Cathedral of Valencia from 1479, the Tortosa Cathedral, from 1490. He will be employed by the house of Borgia in the Monastery of Sant Jeroni de Cotalba, near Gandia (Valencia) where he will realize the sculptures of the upper cloister and a gothic stair. and in the Collegiate Basilica of Gandia.

== Sources ==
- Nobile, M.R. (2006). Matteo Carnilivari, Pere Compte 1506-2006: due maestri del gotico nel Mediterraneo. Palermo: Caracol.
