= Jaume March II =

Valencian poet

Jaume March (1334/1335–1410) was a Catalan language poet.

Brother of Pere March and uncle of Arnau March and the renowned Ausiàs March, Jaume's family had been lawyers and officers of the court of the king of Aragon. Born in Valencia he was seemingly the eldest son, and inherited the family's possessions around Barcelona. He was knighted by King Peter the Ceremonious and in 1393 was charged with the direction of a poetical institute—the Consistory of Barcelona—founded by King John.
