= A Lady =

A Lady may refer to:

- Jane Austen, who published Sense and Sensibility under this by-line
- George Alexander Stevens, who wrote part of The Female Inquisition under this name
- Eliza Parsons, who wrote Rosetta under this name
- Hannah Maynard Pickard, author who used this name
- The author of The Ladies Library, published by Richard Steele
- Rosalind Lutece, a character in the video game BioShock Infinite
- "A Lady", a song by Tally Hall from the 2011 album, Good & Evil

== See also ==
- Lady (disambiguation)
- The Lady (disambiguation)
