= Lonja de la Seda =

Civil building in Valencia, Spain

Silk Market
- Lonja de la Seda (Spanish); Llotja de la Seda (Valencian)
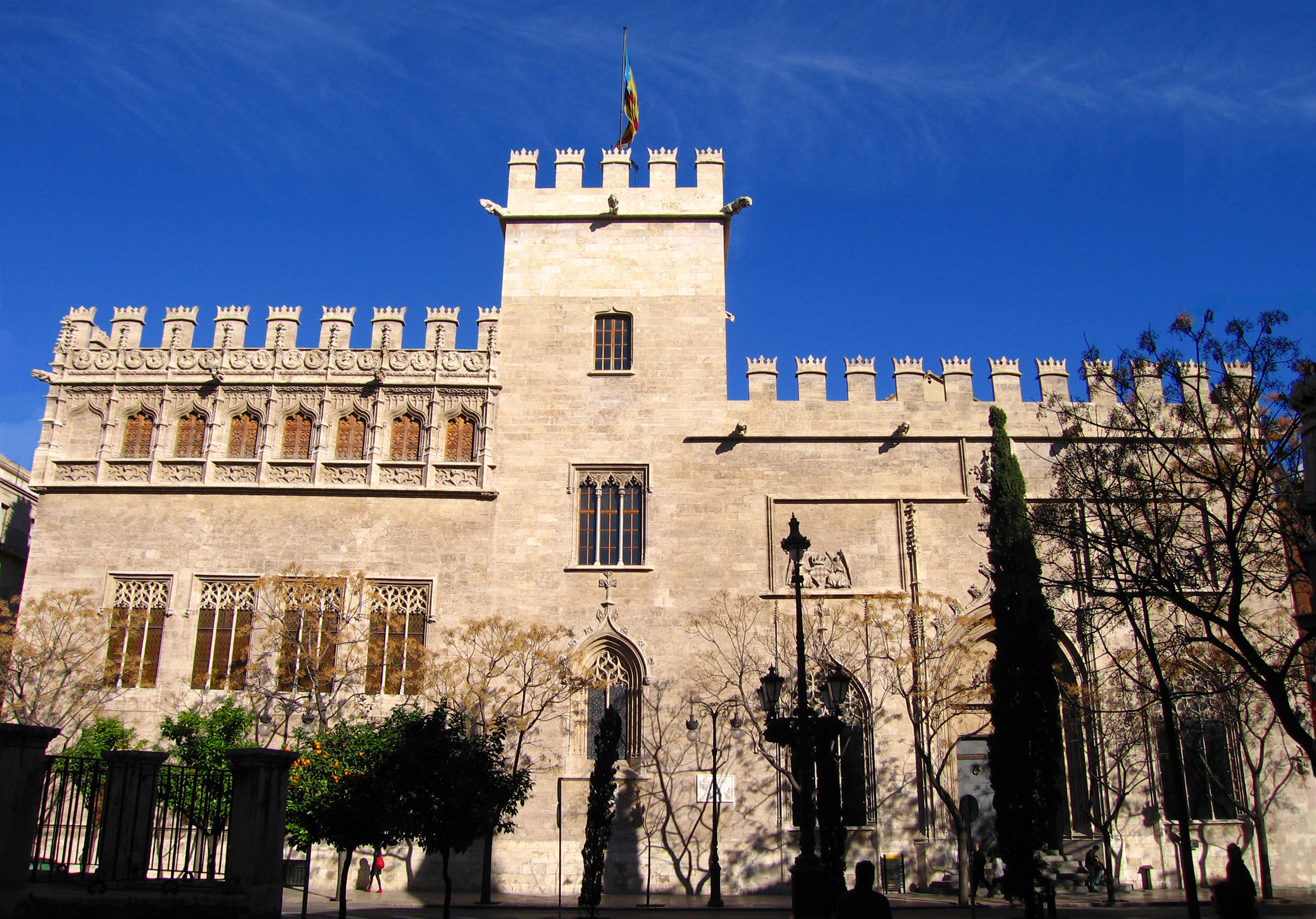
- Interactive map of Silk Market
- 39°28′27.9″N 0°22′42.4″W
- Location: Valencia, Valencian Community, Spain

Site notes
- Architect: Pere Compte
- Architectural style: Valencian Gothic
- Visitors: (in 2009)

UNESCO World Heritage Site
- Official name: Lonja de la Seda de Valencia
- Type: Cultural
- Criteria: i, iv
- Designated: 1996 (20th session)
- Reference no.: 782
- Region: Europe and North America

Spanish Cultural Heritage
- Official name: Lonja de la Seda
- Type: Real property
- Criteria: Monument
- Designated: 3 June 1931
- Reference no.: (R.I.) - 51 - 0000968 - 00000

The Lonja de la Seda [ˈloŋxa ðe la ˈseða]; or Llotja de la Seda (in Valencian) (Valencian: [ˈʎɔdʒa ðe la ˈseða]; or alternatively in English "Silk Exchange", is a late Valencian Gothic-style civil building in Valencia, Spain. It is a principal tourist attraction in the city.

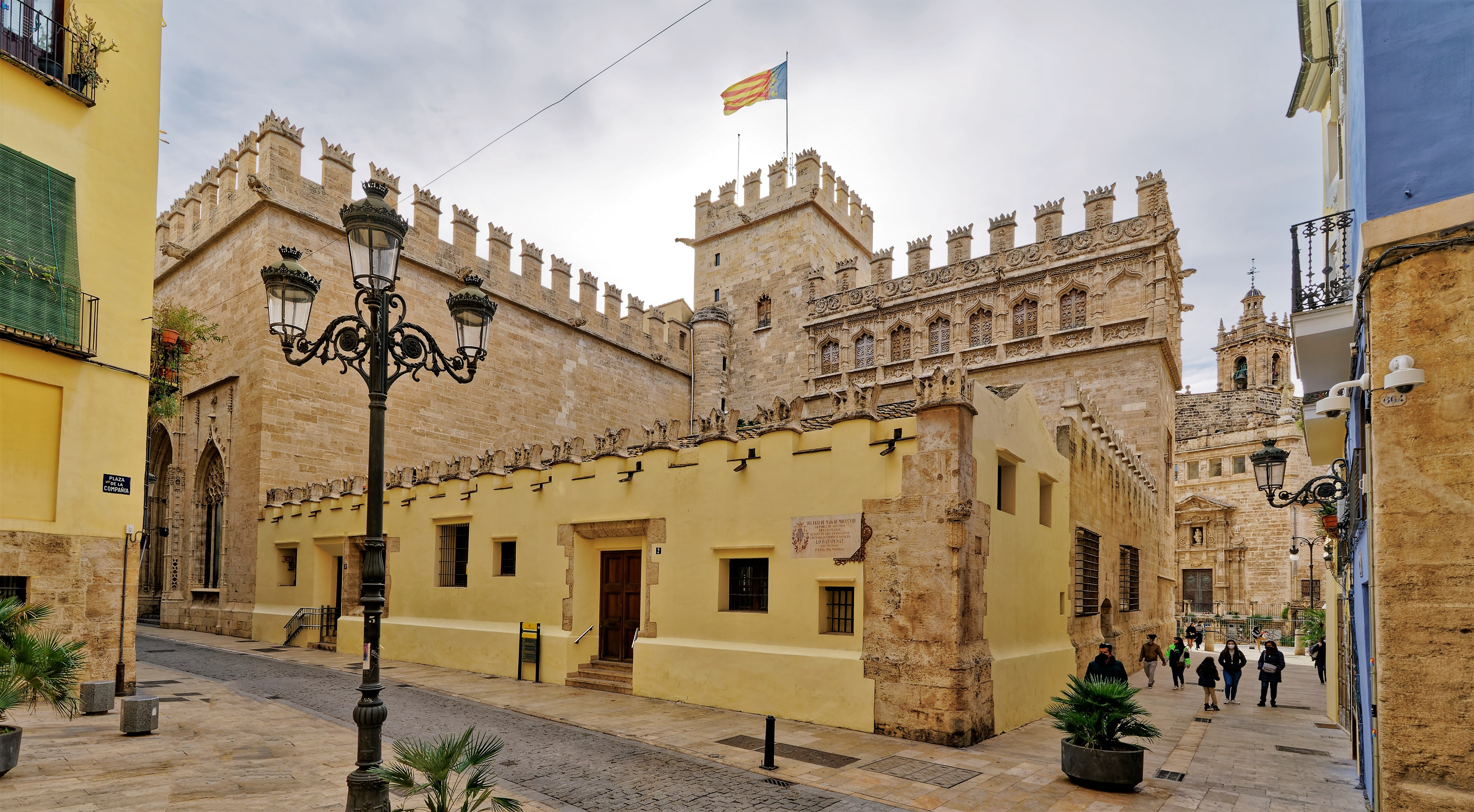
The Silk Exchange in Valencia

== History ==
Built between 1482 and 1533, the Llotja is composed of three parts (plus the Orange Garden - a walled courtyard). The main hall, Sala de Contractació (The Trading Hall), is a large lavishly decorated space supported by gorgeous twisted columns. This was the financial centre of La Lonja, where the merchants worked out contracts. The side-wing is named the Pavilion of the Consulate, and this was the seat of the Consolat del Mar - the first marine merchant tribunal to ever be formed in Spain. On the first two floors were the main rooms. The second floor had a richly decorated ceiling. These rooms still have the original furnishings. Occasionally, the Tribunal would imprison merchants for debts in the central tower of La Lonja - the third part of the structure.

Behind the current building, there was an earlier one from the 14th century, which was called the Oil Exchange (Llotja de l’Oli, in Valencian, or Lonja del Aceite, in Spanish). It was used for trading – including agricultural oils. In 1348 perxal (percale) – a type of silk – was traded.

Valencia's commercial prosperity reached its peak during the 15th century, and led to the construction of a new building. The design of the new Lonja of Valencia was derived from a similar structure in the Lonja of Palma de Majorca, built by the architect Guillem Sagrera in 1448. The architect in charge of the new Lonja was Pere Compte, who built the main body of the building – the Trading Hall (or Sala de Contractació in Valencian) – in only fifteen years (1483–1498). So is written in a blue band that runs along all four walls of the Trading Hall, also called "Hall of Columns". It proclaims in golden letters the following inscription:

Inclita domus sum annis aedificata quindecim. Gustate et videte concives quoniam bona est negotiatio, quae non agit dolum in lingua, quae jurat proximo et non deficit, quae pecuniam non dedit ad usuram eius. Mercator sic agens divitiis redundabit, et tandem vita fructur aeterna.

According to the local Valencian scholar Joan Francesc Mira, this inscription showed that it was not necessary to be a Protestant or a foreigner to enter into a good trade. It also illustrated the integration of ethical principles with the economy. Other construction and decorative projects continued until 1548, such as the Consolat del Mar (Consulate of the Sea), a Renaissance building attached to La Lonja.

During subsequent centuries, La Lonja functioned as a silk exchange. The honesty of its traders is honored by the inscription that runs around the main contract hall.

In 1996 UNESCO listed it as a World Heritage Site. Its listing states that "the site is of outstanding universal value as it is a wholly exceptional example of a secular building in late Gothic style, which dramatically illustrates the power and wealth of one of the great Mediterranean mercantile cities."

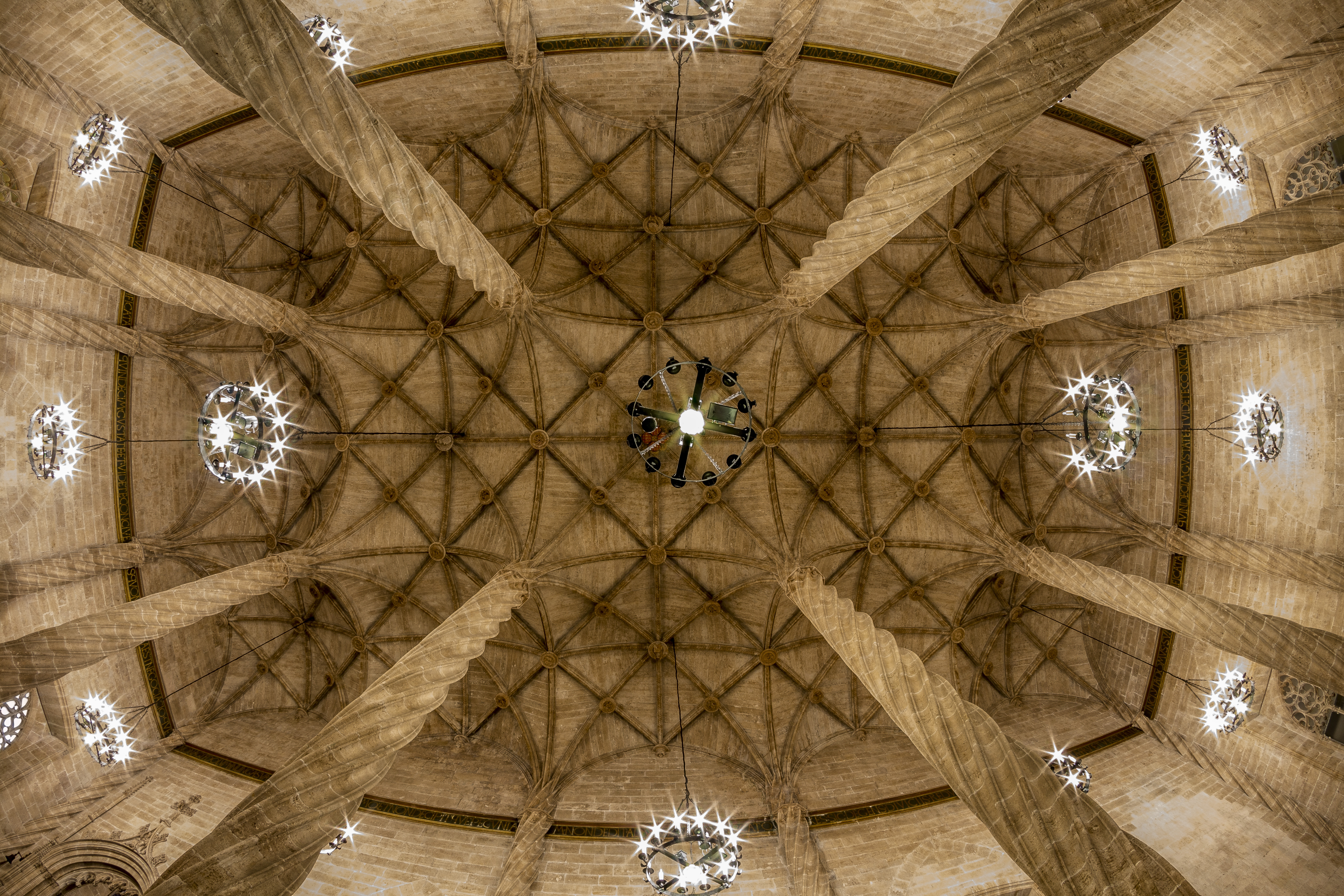
Fisheye view of The Hall of Columns ceiling

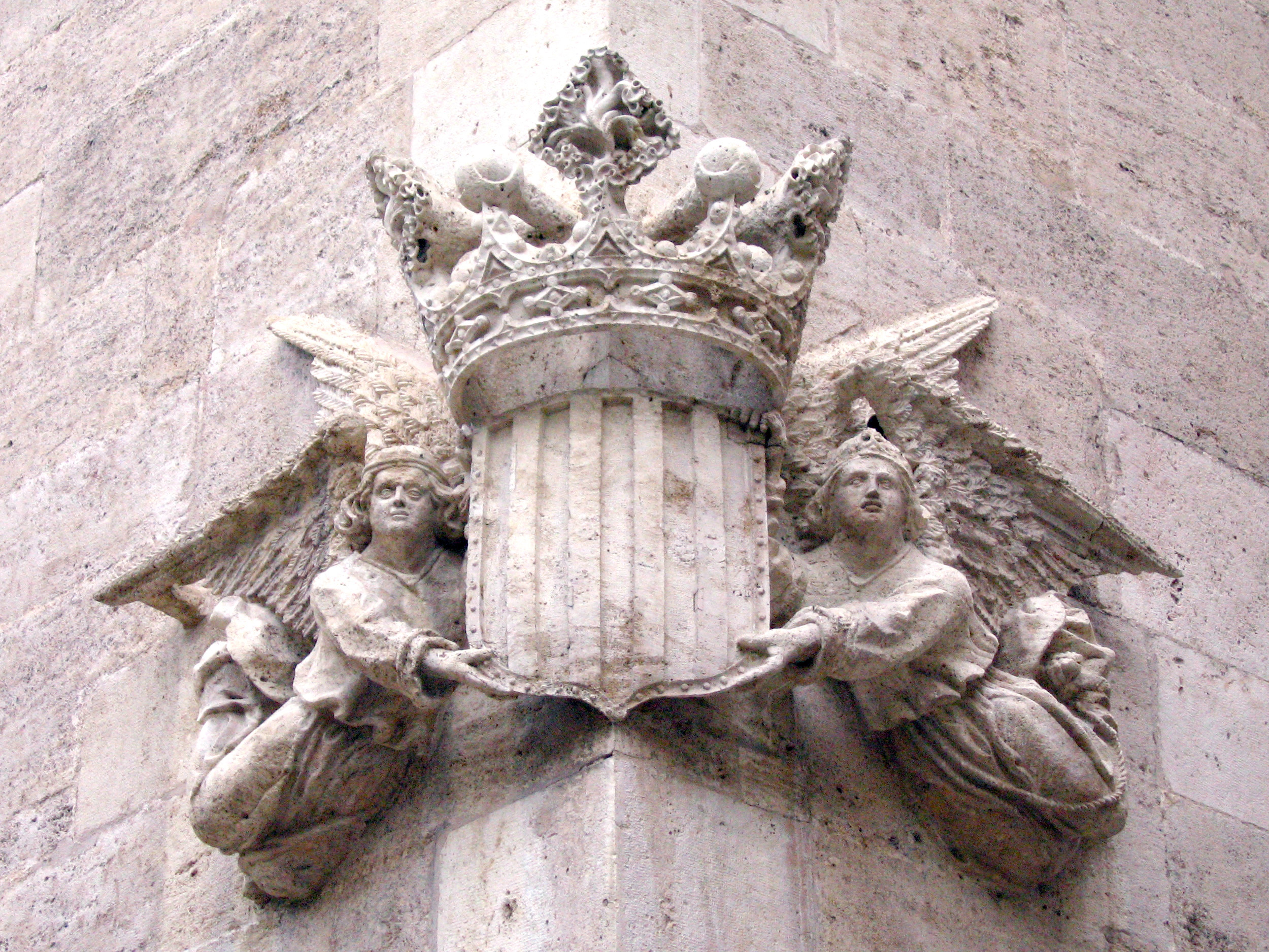
Royal arms of Kingdom of Valencia in the Llotja

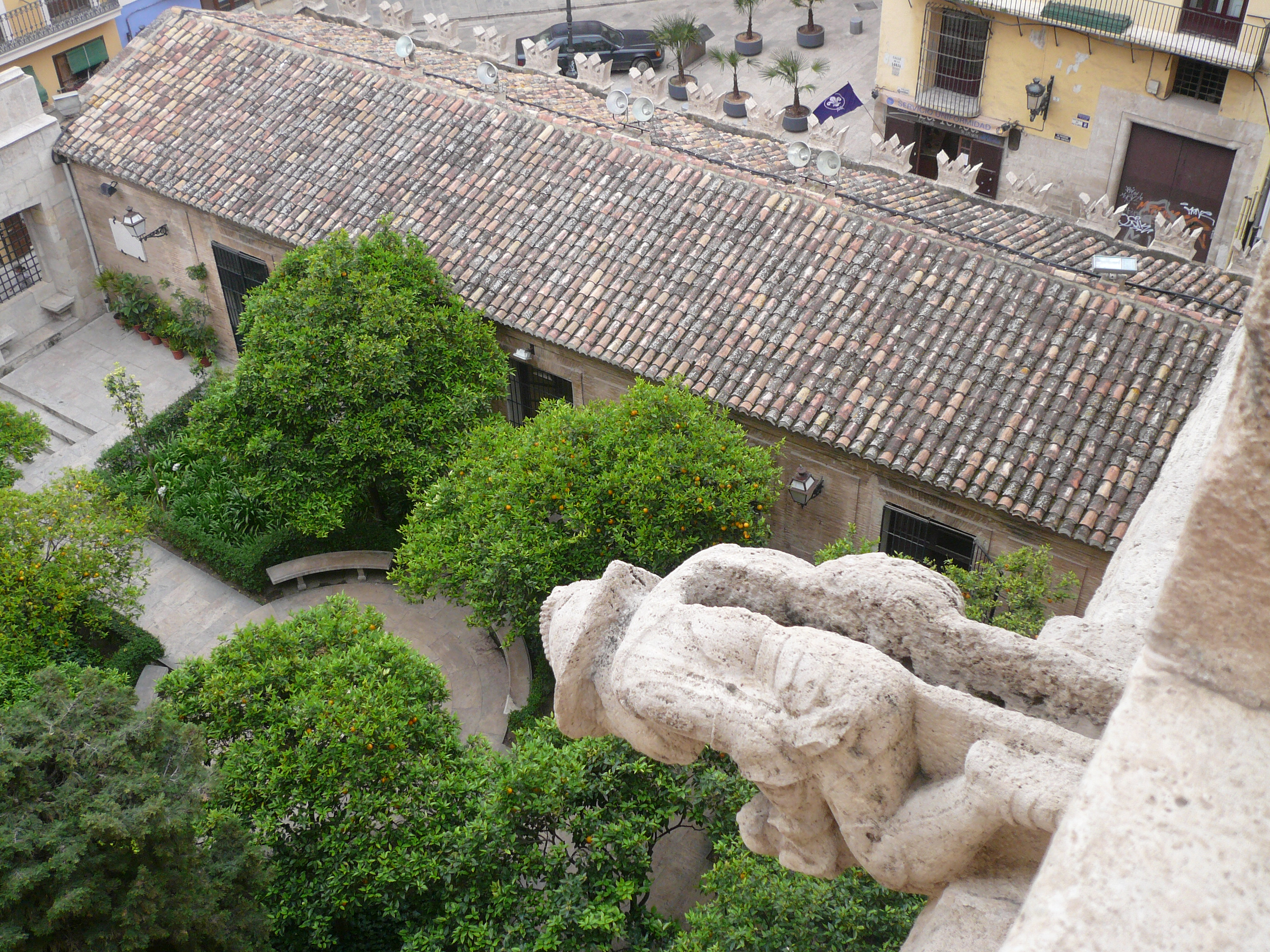
View of the Orange Garden courtyard

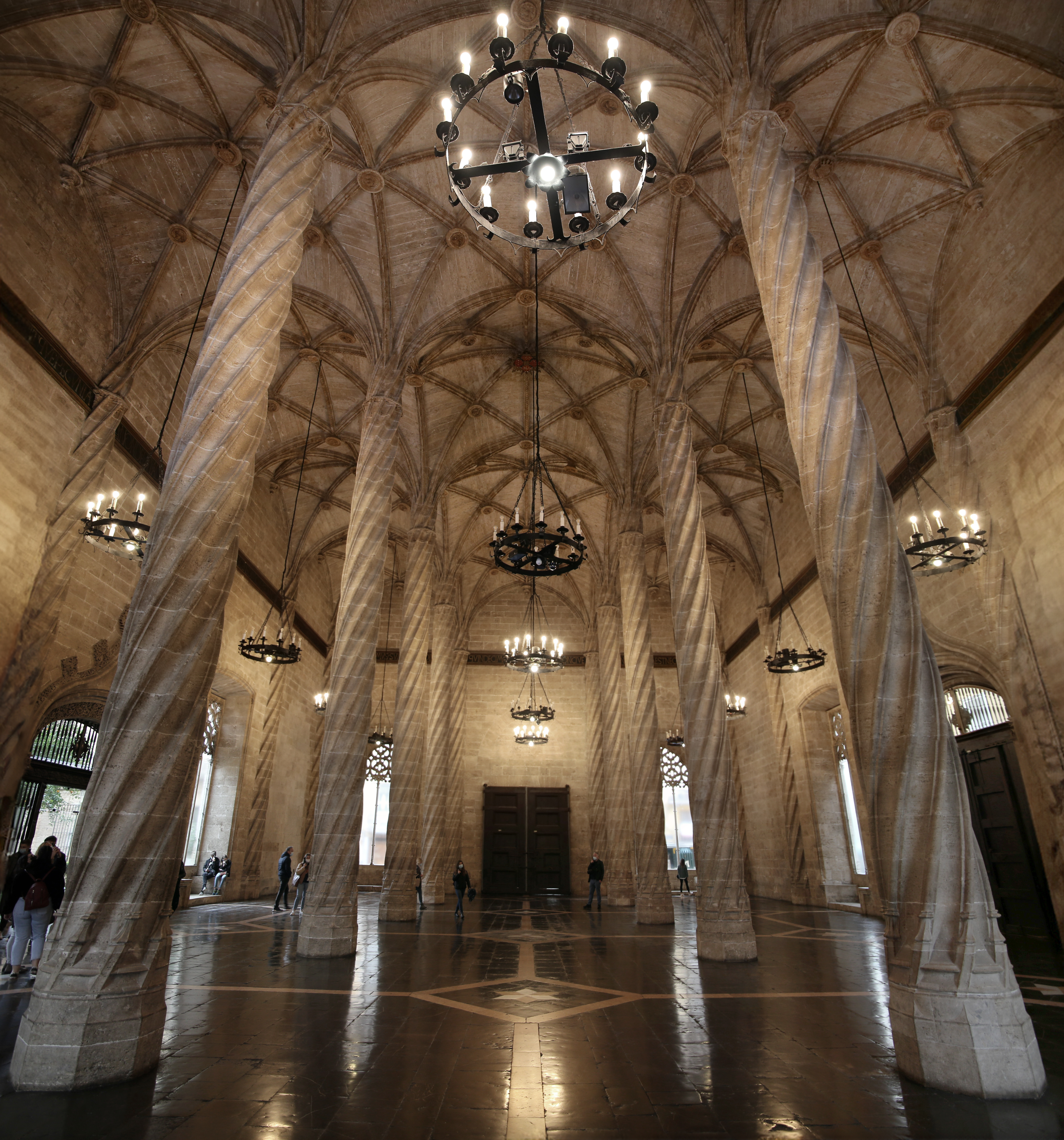
The Hall of Columns

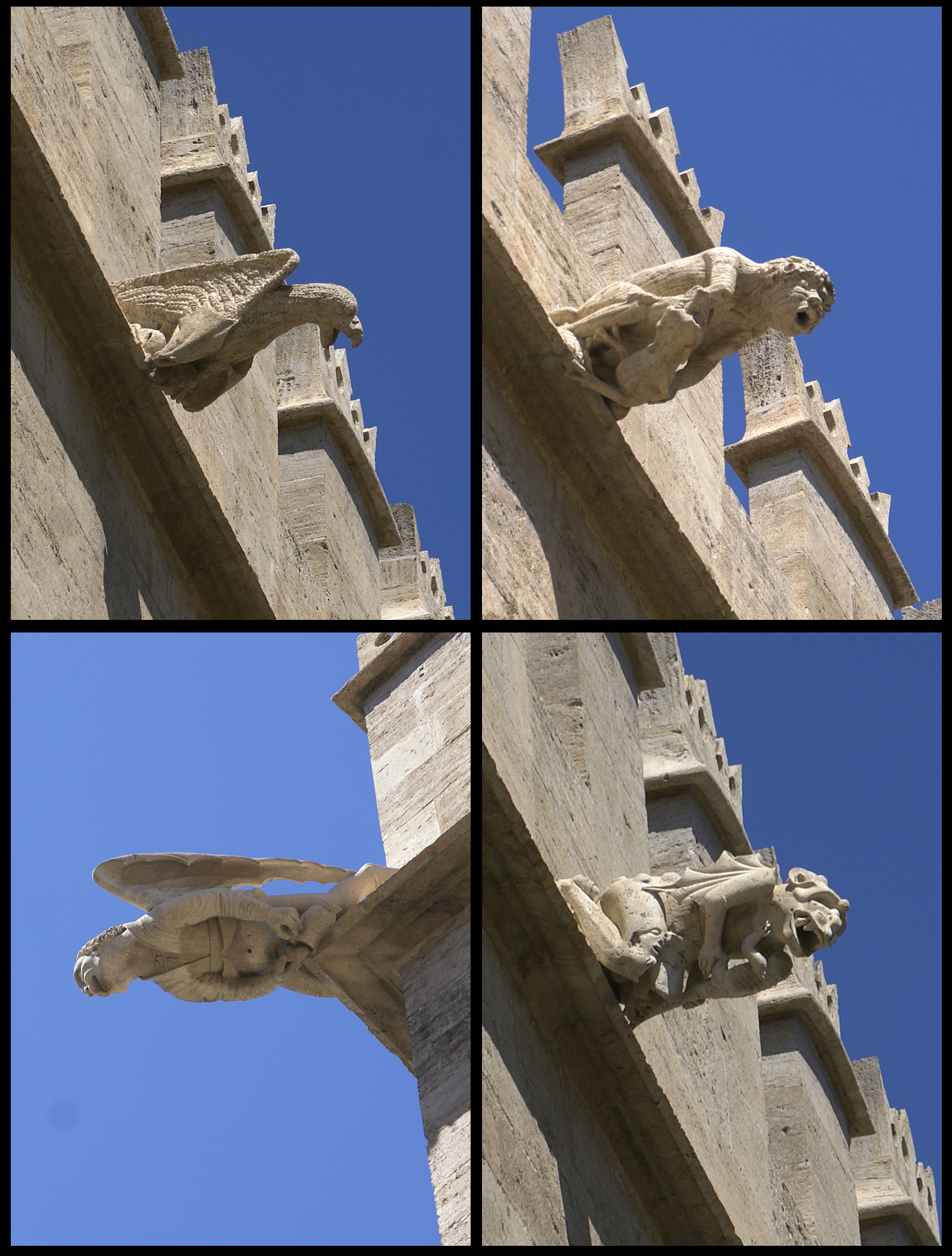
Some Gargoyles of Llotja de la Seda

== See also ==
- Llotja
