= Ausiàs March =

Valencian poet and knight

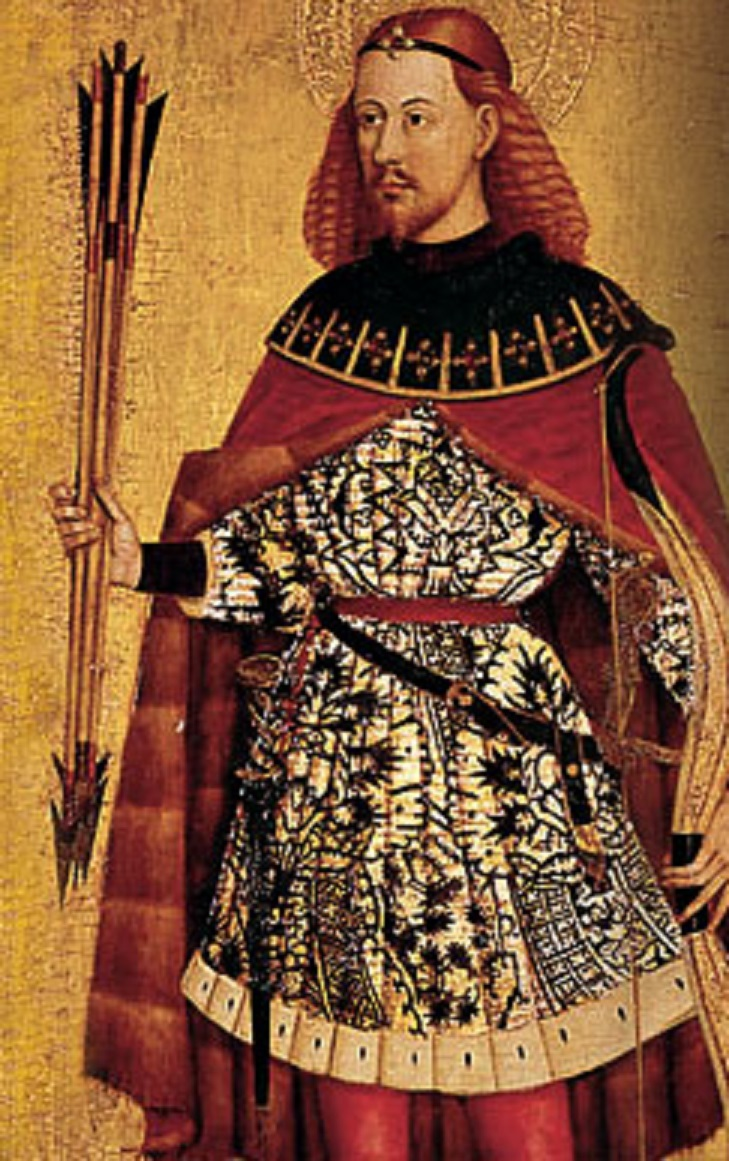
- A 15th-century painting by Jacomart in the Church of Santa Maria in Xàtiva, once thought to portray Ausiàs March
- Born: 1400; Kingdom of Valencia (Crown of Aragon)
- Died: 1459 (aged 58–59); Valencia, Kingdom of Valencia (Crown of Aragon)
- Occupations: Poet and knight
- Spouses: Isabel Martorell (m. 1439–1441) Joana Escorna (m. 1443–1450)
- Relatives: Pere March (father); Jaume March II (uncle); Arnau March (cousin)
- Writing career
- Language: Valencian language
- Notable works: Plena de Seny, Llir entre Cards, Amor, amor, Mon darrer bé, Oh, foll amor

Ausiàs March (Valencian: [awziˈaz ˈmaɾk]; 1400 – March 3, 1459) was a Valencian poet and knight from Gandia, Valencia. He is considered one of the most important poets of the "Golden Century" (Segle d'or) of Valencian literature.

== Biography ==
Not much is known of March's life. He was born in approximately 1400 to a Valencian noble family. His father, Pere March, was himself a poet and served at the court of the younger brother of King Alfonso IV, Peter. His uncle, Jaume March II, was also a poet. March was one of the two children of Pere's second wife, Lionor of Ripoll; he had a younger sister, Peirona.

In 1413, the still-young March became head of his family—part of the Valencian petty nobility—upon the death of his father. From a very young age he took part in the expeditions that King Alfons el Magnànim carried out in the Mediterranean. After returning from these expeditions in 1427, he settled in Gandia. After his return, he would never again leave the region where he was born. March was twice married: first to Isabel Martorell (sister of the writer Joanot Martorell), and later to Joana Escorna.

In 1450, he moved from Gandia to Valencia. It was there that he died on March 3, 1459. While March himself was buried in his family's chapel at the Valencia Cathedral, his two wives and family are buried in the Monastery of Sant Jeroni de Cotalba. Five illegitimate children but no legitimate heirs have been attributed to him.

== Poetry ==
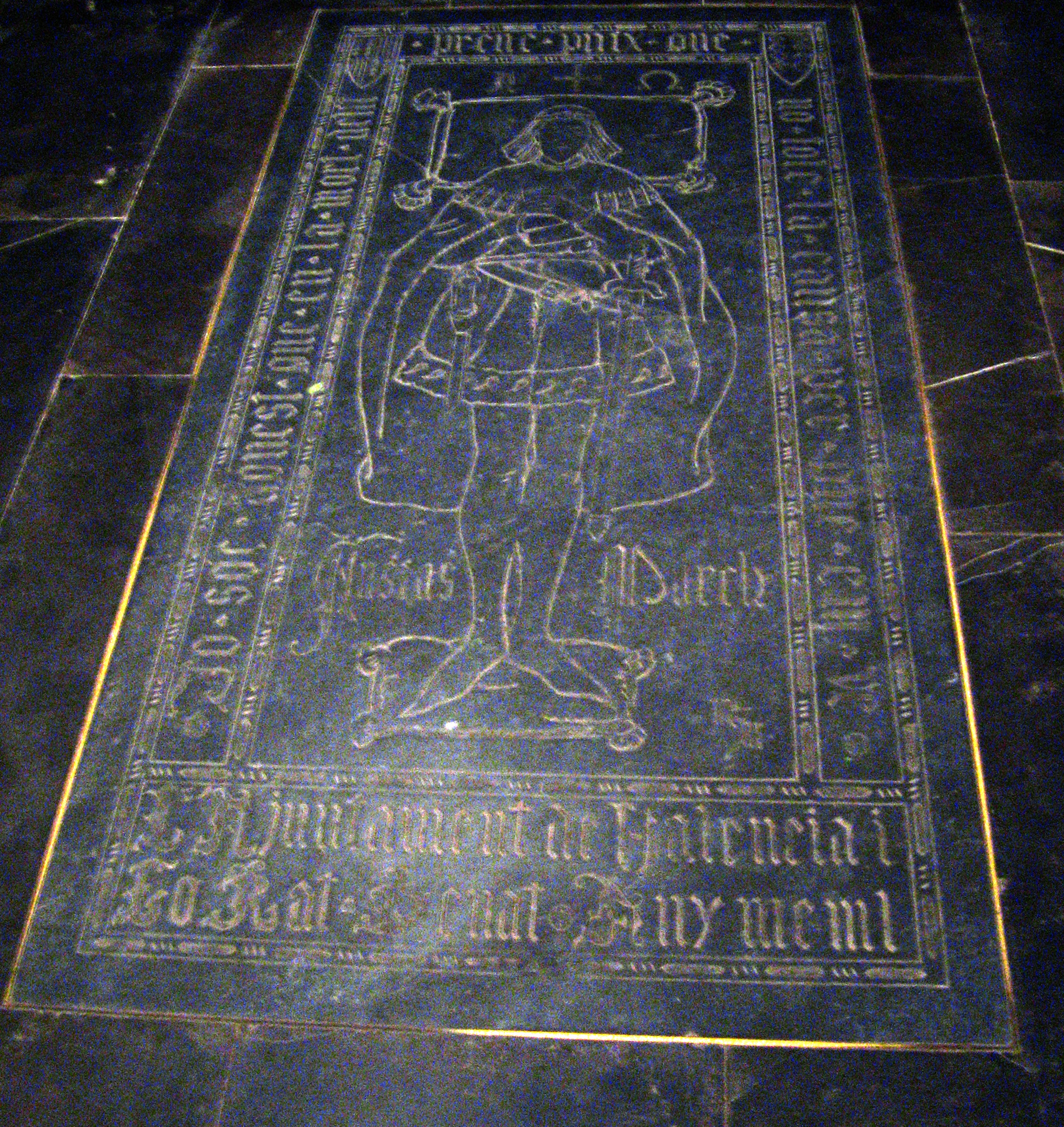
March's tomb, in the Valencia Cathedral

Inheriting an easy fortune from his father, Pere March—the treasurer to the Duke of Gandia—and enjoying the powerful patronage of Charles of Viana, prince of Aragon, March was able to devote himself to poetical composition. He was an undisguised follower of Petrarch, carrying the imitation to such a point that he addressed his Cants d'amor (love songs) to a lady whom he professed to have seen first in church on Good Friday. So far as the difference of language allows, he reproduced the rhythmical cadences of his model, but this should be qualified as the medieval tradition of locus communis requested this following. This is something Petrarch himself did and it need not to be stressed. March is a very original and idiosyncratic poet. In the Cants de mort (death hymns) he touches a note of brooding sentiment peculiar to himself. It can be said that he developed Petrarch's rhetoric and used it for more inner psychological meditations, as other major poets such a Camões and Shakespeare would.

March was one of the first poets to use the local vernacular, Valencian, instead of the troubadour language, Occitan. His poems are marked by obscurity, a sometimes monotonous morbidity, and a conflicting battle between desire and morality, achieved at its apex in the great Cant Spiritual. He was fully entitled to the supremacy which he enjoyed among his contemporaries, and the success of his innovation no doubt encouraged Boscán to introduce the Italian metres into Castilian. His verses were transmitted in manuscript tradition until its first print edition in Valencian in 1543, but they had already become known through the Spanish translation in 1539.

March's poetry has been set to music by Raimon, Joan Brudieu and other composers.

== Gallery ==
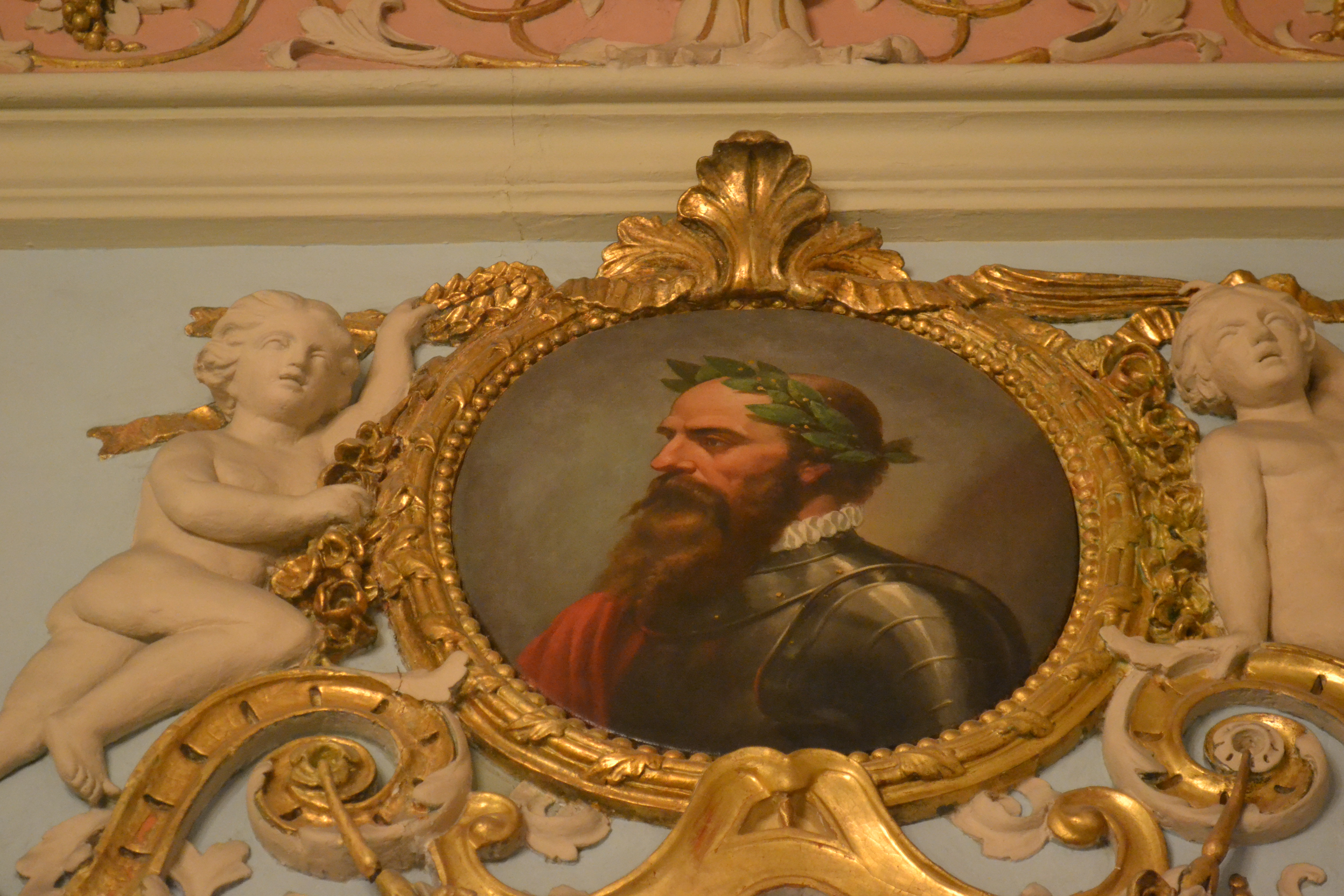
Portrait at the Palace of the Marqués de Dosaigües, Valencia

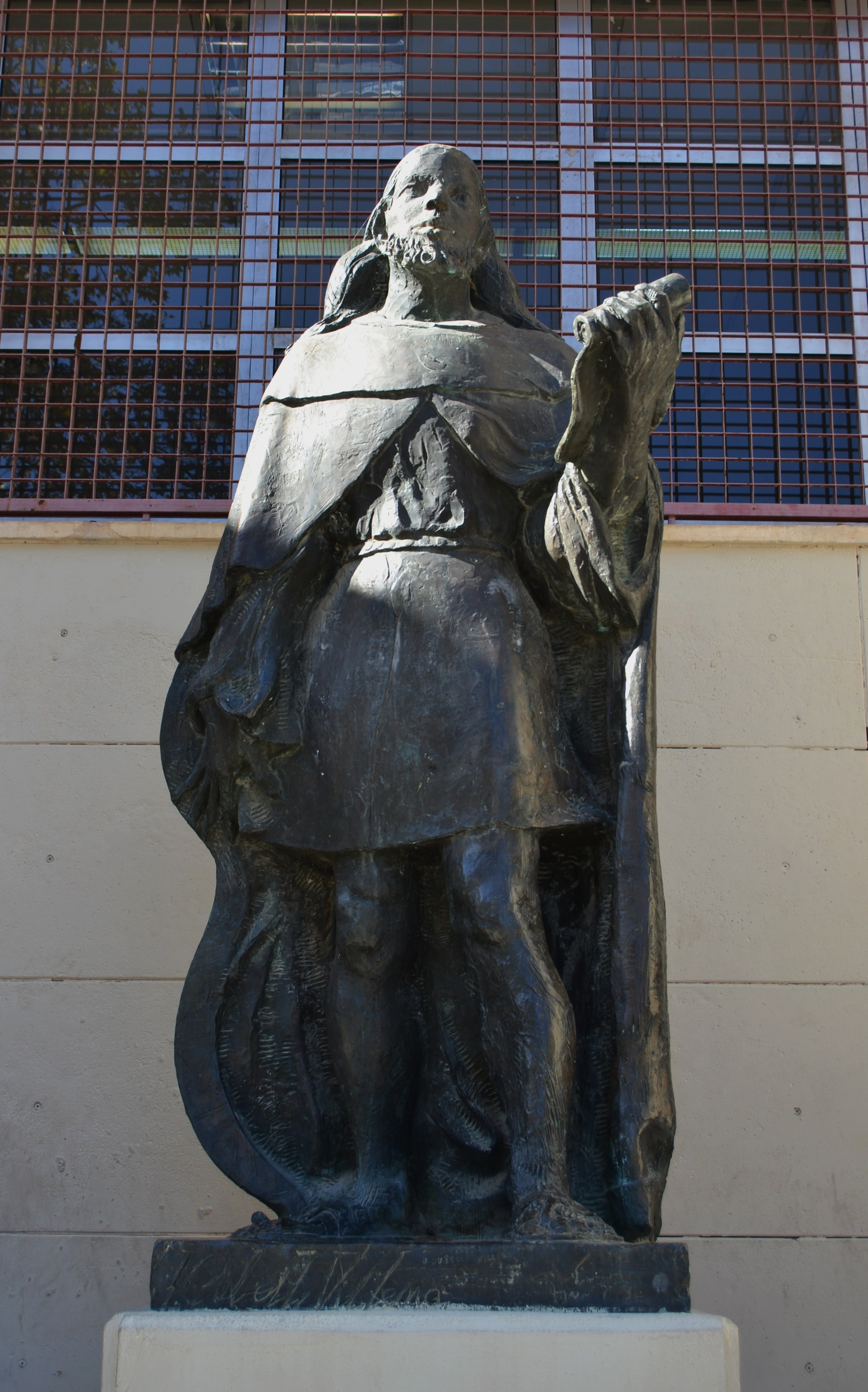
Statue of March at the Central Municipal Library of Valencia

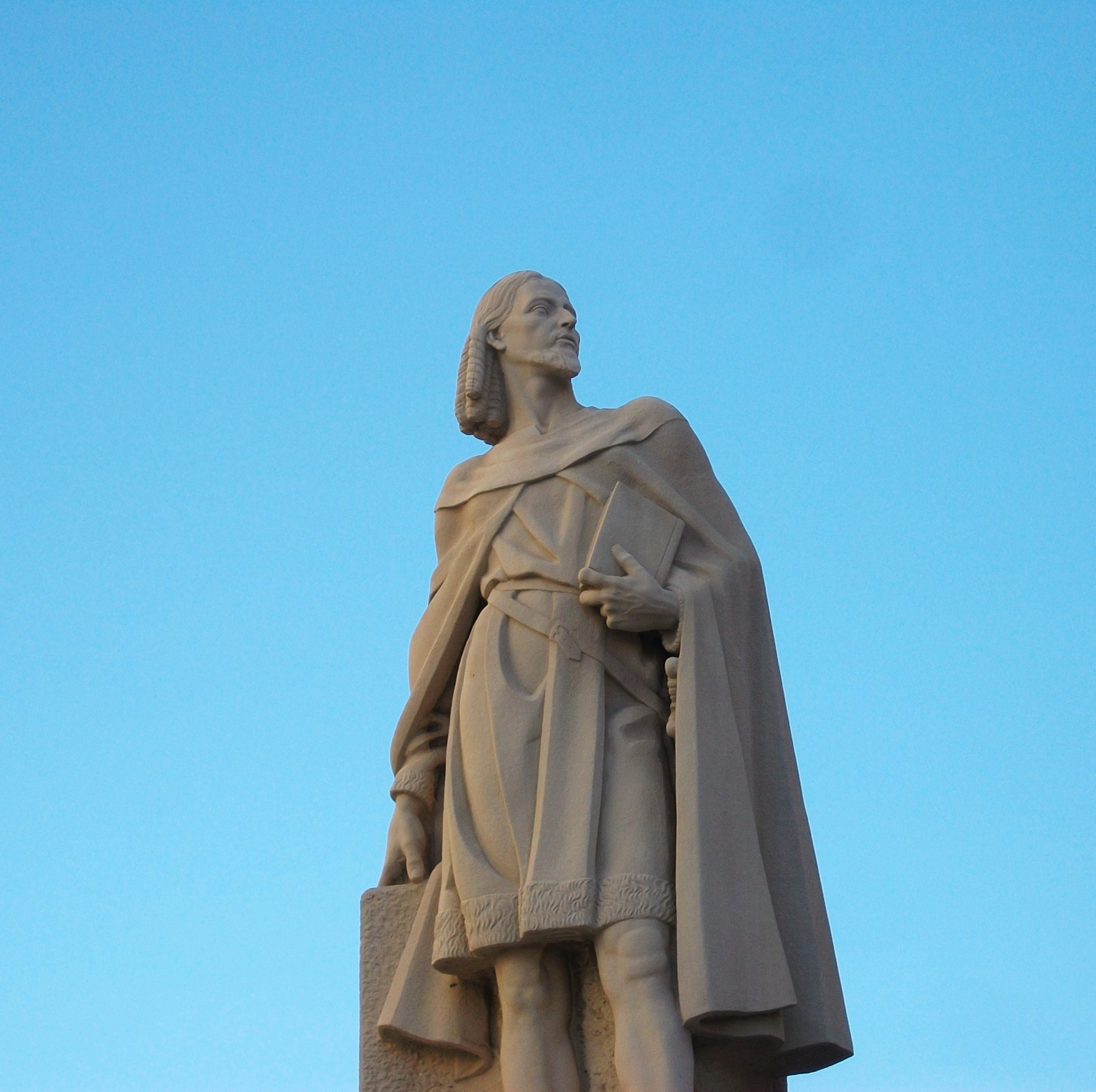
Monument in Gandia

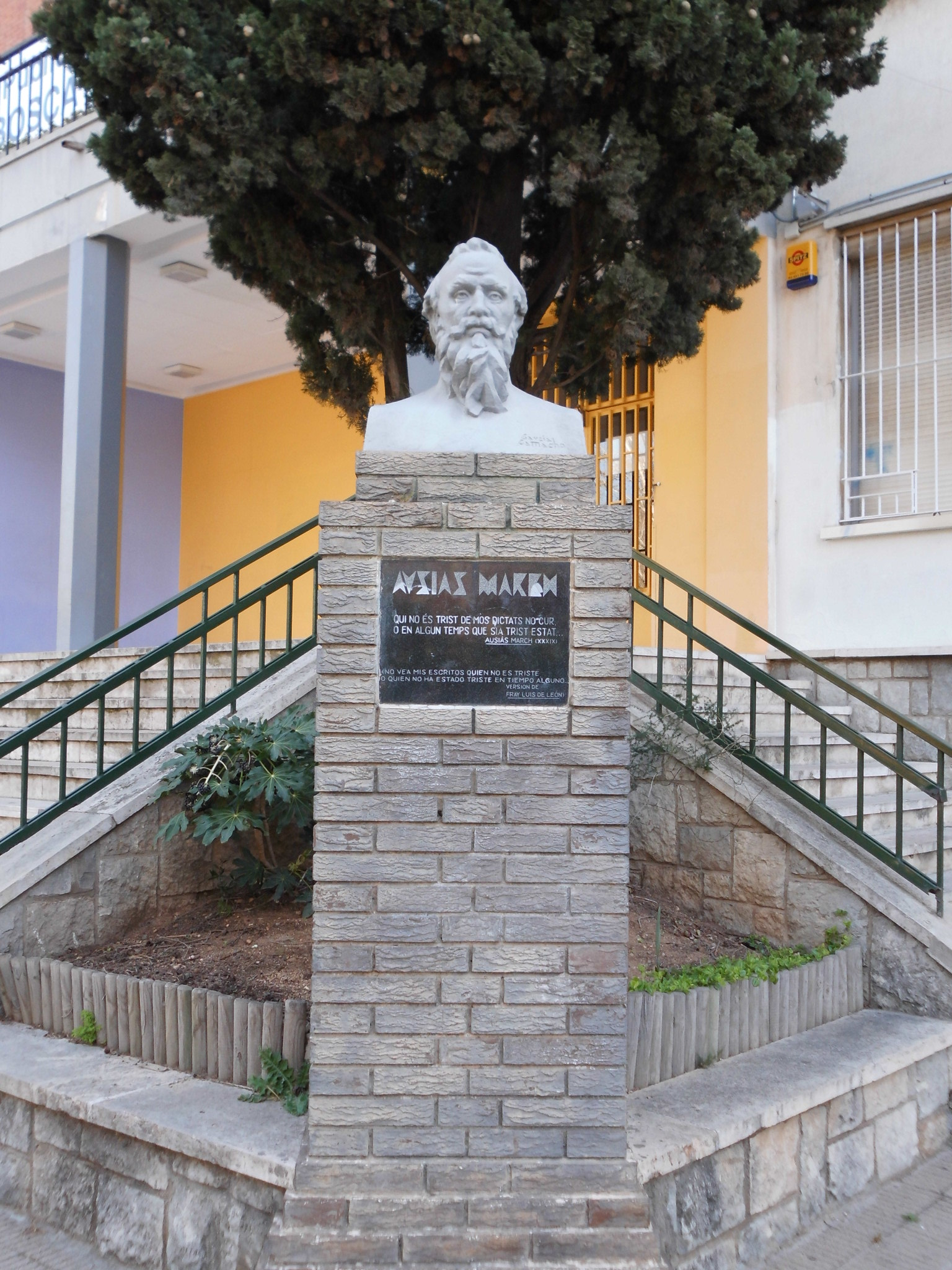
Monument on the premises of a secondary school in Barcelona

== See also ==
- Monastery of Sant Jeroni de Cotalba
- Route of the Valencian classics
