= Nicolás Borrás =

Spanish painter

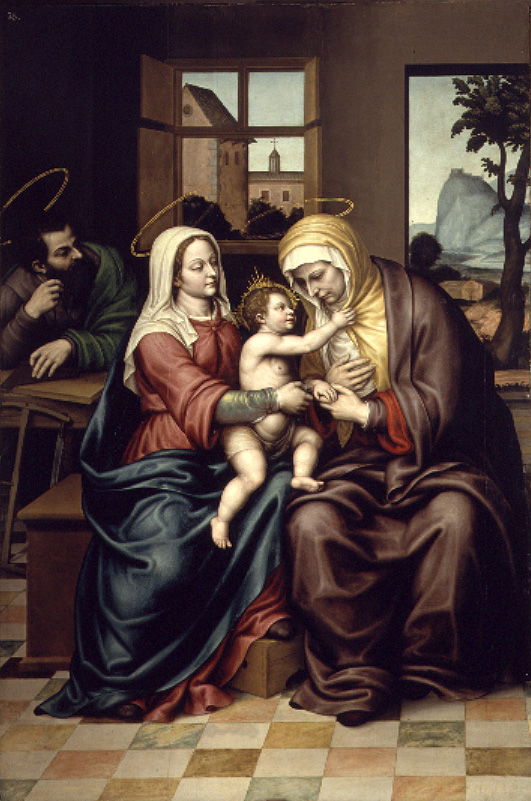
- Holy Family with St. Anne, XVI, Museu de Belles Arts de València
- Born: 1530; Cocentaina, Kingdom of Valencia, Spain
- Died: September 5, 1610 (aged 79–80); Monastery of Sant Jeroni de Cotalba, Alfauir, Spain
- Known for: Painting
- Movement: Spanish Renaissance

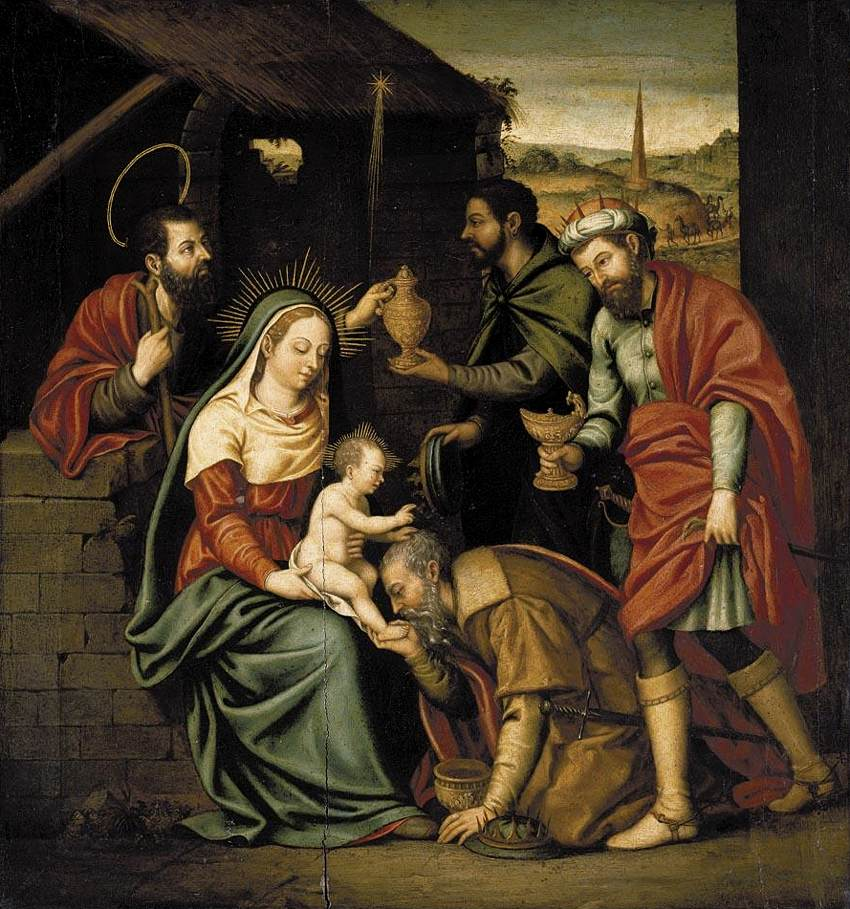
The Adoration of the Magi by Nicolás Borrás, private collection, 1570s

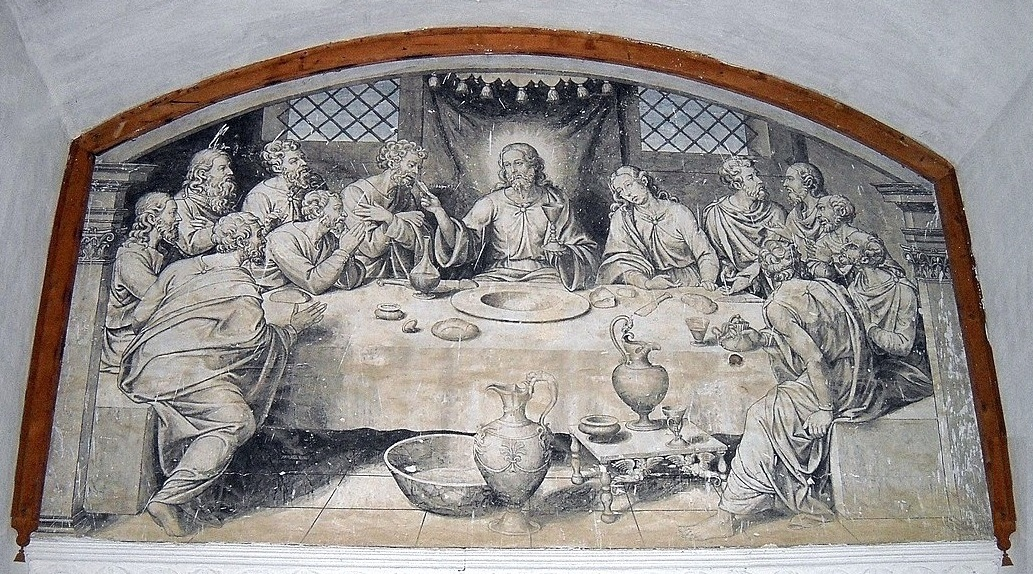
The Last Supper painted in fresco by Nicolás Borrás. Refectory of the Monastery of Sant Jeroni de Cotalba, XVI.

Friar Nicolás Borrás (1530–1610) was a Spanish Renaissance Catholic monk and painter, active in Valencia.

== Biography ==
Borrás was born in Cocentaina (Kingdom of Valencia), nowadays in the Province of Alicante. He is one of the best artists of Valencian monastic painting. Going to Valencia at an early age to study under Vicente Juan Macip, he became the latter's most noteworthy pupil. Borrás's works generally resemble those of Macip and some of them have been taken for his.

Upon entering the priesthood, Borrás was assigned to the Hieronymite Monastery of Saint Jerome of Cotalba in Gandia, where he painted the greater altarpiece of the church. Borrás enjoyed his stay so much that he asked for membership in the order has his only payment. He received the habit in 1575, and took the final vows the following year.

Three years later, Borrás spent some time with the Capuchins at the Franciscan monastery of San Juan de Ribera, near Valencia. He was soon back, however, at Cotalba, where he passed the rest of his life.

== Works ==
The altarpiece Borrás painted in Cotalba consisted in fourteen tables. There was a sculpture of Saint Jerome in the middle. In addition, he made other altarpieces for the chapels of the church and the chapterhouse. Also he produced paintings for different parts of the monastery. He painted four great linens for the stations of the low cloister. However, the only work conserved in its original place was The Saint Supper painted in fresco. It is placed in what nowadays is known as the oil mill, that originally was the dining hall (refectory).

Borrás painted twelve altar pieces in the Monastery of Saint Jerome, as well as hiring sculptors and builders for its embellishment.

Borrás also did much work for churches and religious houses in Valencia, Madrid, and elsewhere. His paintings appeared in Saint Mary of Valencia Cathedral and at the Hieronymite monastery in the city of San Miguel de los Reyes where there was a "Christ at the Column", and a picture of the painter in adoration of "The Holy Virgin". Others were in the church of St. Stephen in Gandia, in the Escorial in Aldaia, and in Ontinyent. In the Museum of Fine Arts of Valencia there are some fifty paintings by Borrás chiefly from Gandia and San Miguel. Among them are The Last Supper, Christ Bearing His Cross, The Dead Saviour in the Arms of the Eternal Father, and The Archangel Michael Driving Souls into Purgatory and Hell. In the last Borrás is supposed to have pictured himself as a white-robed monk kneeling on the brink. He died, aged about 80, in the Monastery of Sant Jeroni de Cotalba, near Gandia.

== See also ==
- Monastery of Saint Jerome of Cotalba
- Hieronymites

== Bibliography ==
- Benito Domenech, Fernando, Los Ribalta y la pintura valenciana de su tiempo, Valencia-Madrid, 1987, ISBN 978-84-505-6705-2 p. 34-43.
- Benito Domenech, Fernando, ed. Cinco siglos de pintura valenciana (Five Centuries of Valencian Paintings), Obras del Museo de Bellas Artes de Valencia, Madrid, Museo de Bellas Artes de Valencia-Fundación Central Hispano, 1996, ISBN 84-920722-6-1
- Various authors, Nicolás Borrás Falcó, Ayuntamiento de Cocentaina (Alicante), 2010, 187 pages
- Mateo Gómez, Isabel, López-Yarto, Amelia y Prados García, José María, El arte de la Orden Jerónima: historia y mecenazgo, Madrid, Encuentro, 2000, ISBN 978-84-7490-552-6.
