= The Lady =

The Lady may refer to:

- The Lady (magazine), England's oldest weekly magazine aimed at women
- The Lady (1925 film), a 1925 film directed by Frank Borzage
- The Lady (2011 film), a 2011 film about the life of Burmese pro-democracy activist Aung San Suu Kyi
- The Lady (TV series), a 2026 television series
- "The Lady" (The Amazing World of Gumball), a television episode
- The Lady (Warhammer), a deity in the tabletop game Warhammer, produced by Games Workshop
- The Lady of All Nations, a devotional title for Mary, mother of Jesus
- Lady of the Lake, several related characters in Arthurian legend
- Owain, or the Lady of the Fountain, one of the three Welsh romances (Y Tair Rhamant) associated with the Mabinogion
- Aung San Suu Kyi (born 1945), or The Lady, a Burmese politician
- The Lady, the main antagonist of Little Nightmares
- The Lady, a fictional deity in Terry Pratchett's Discworld series

== See also ==
- Lady (disambiguation)
- A Lady (disambiguation)
