= Monastery of Sant Jeroni de Cotalba =

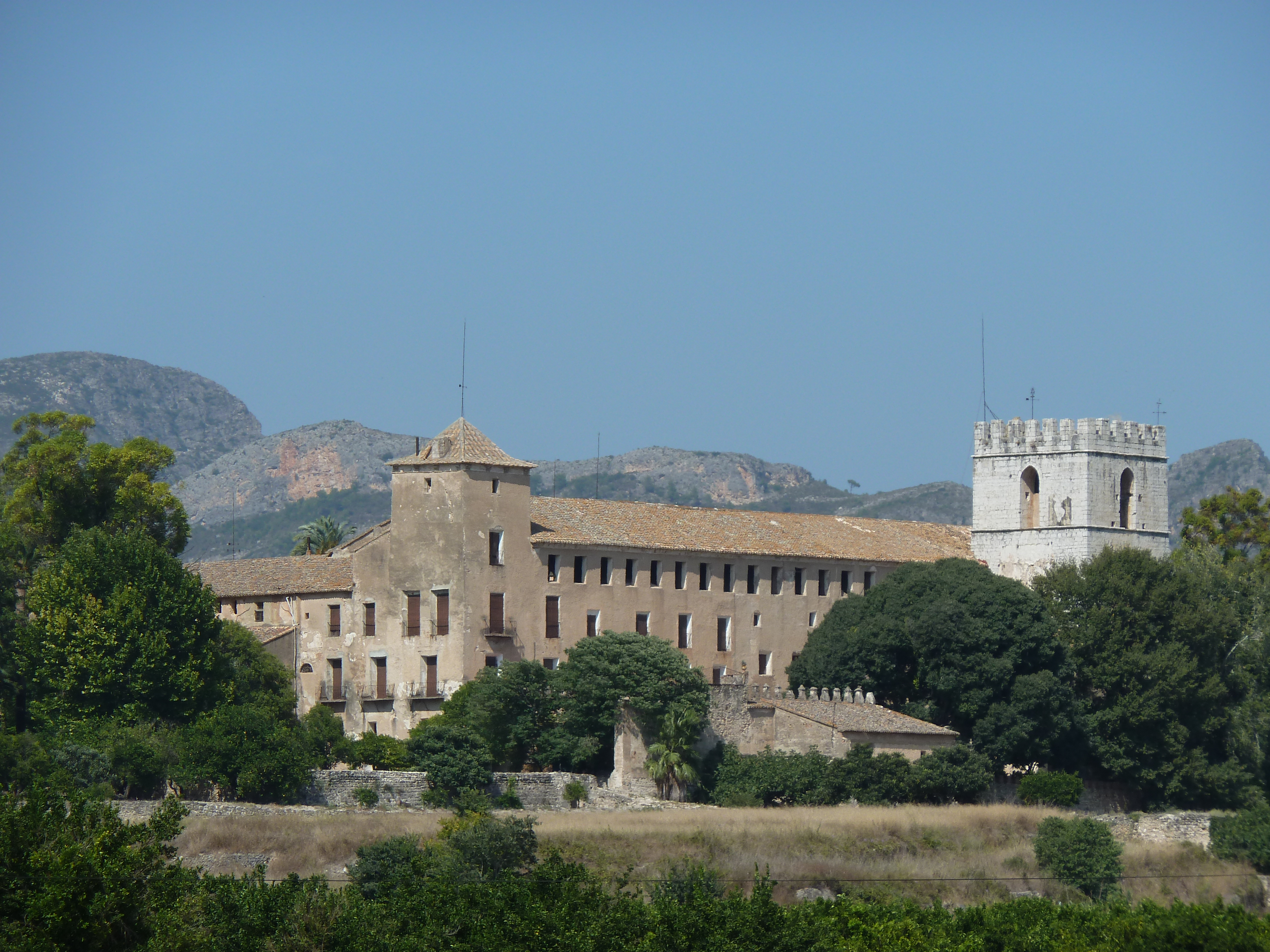
- General view of the monastery from Ròtova.

- Location within Spain
- Interactive map of Monastery of Sant Jeroni de Cotalba

Monastery information
- Full name: Saint Jerome of Cotalba Royal Monastery
- Other name: San Jerónimo de Cotalba
- Order: Hieronymites
- Established: 1388
- Disestablished: 1835
- Dedication: Saint Jerome
- Diocese: Valencia

People
- Founder: Royal Duke of Gandia
- Important associated figures: Ausiàs March, House of Borgia, Duke of Gandia

Site
- Location: Alfauir, (Valencian Community), Spain
- Coordinates: 38°56′26.71″N 0°14′46.34″W
- Visible remains: All. Fully preserved.
- Public access: Yes
- Website: www.cotalba.es

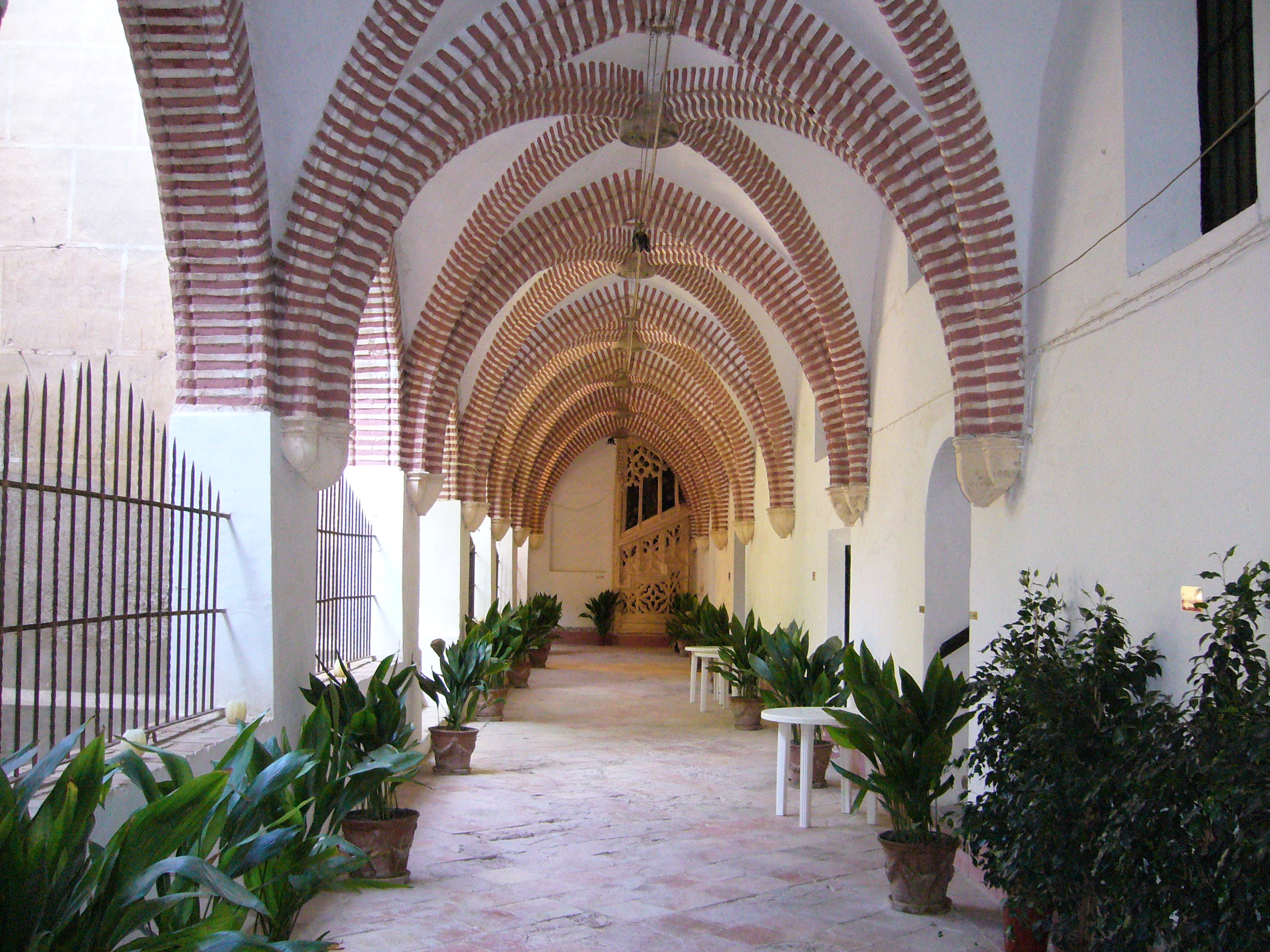
Wings of the Gothic-Mudéjar cloister of the monastery, 14th century.

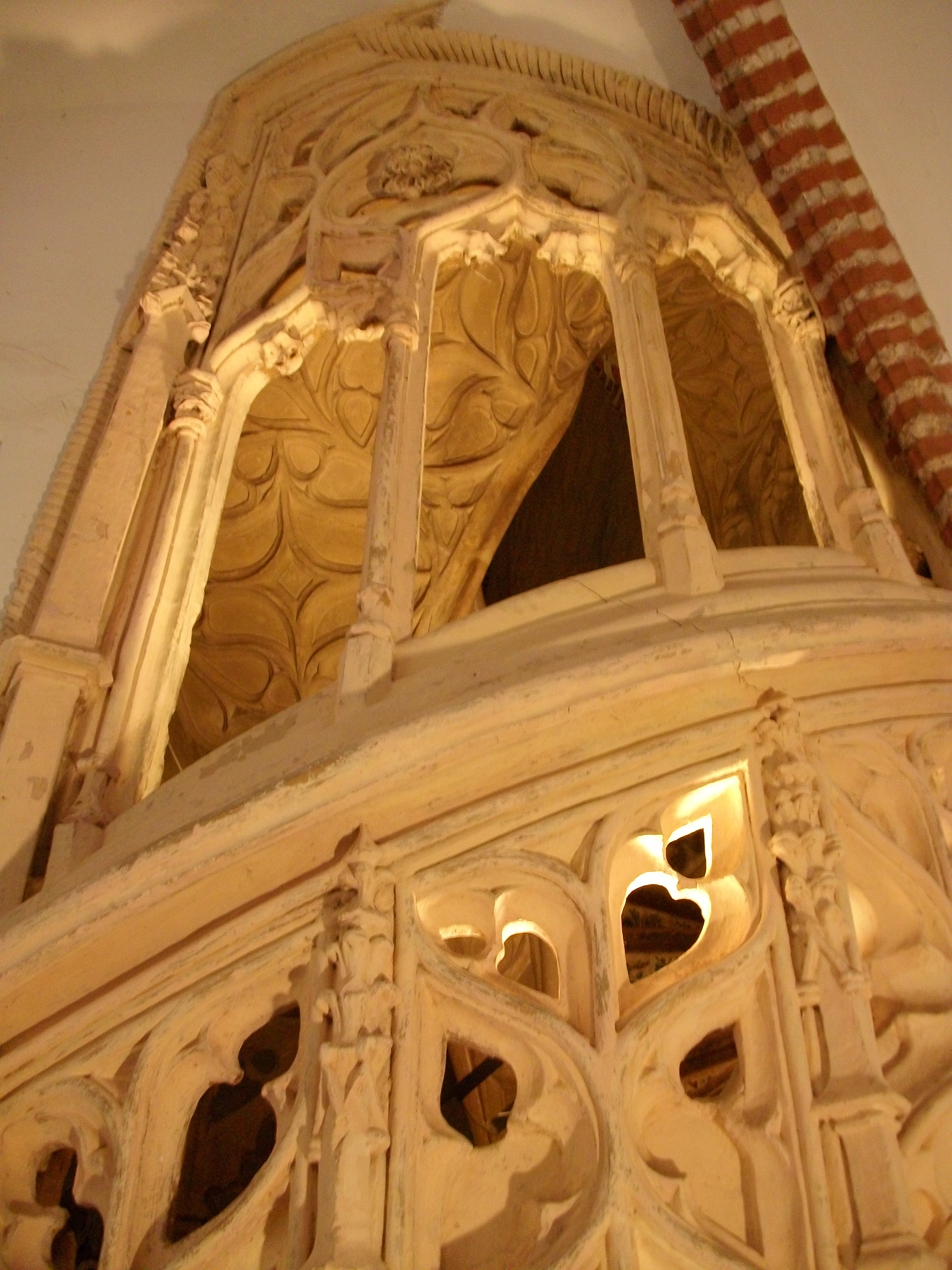
Valencian Gothic stairs, work of Pere Compte, 15th century.

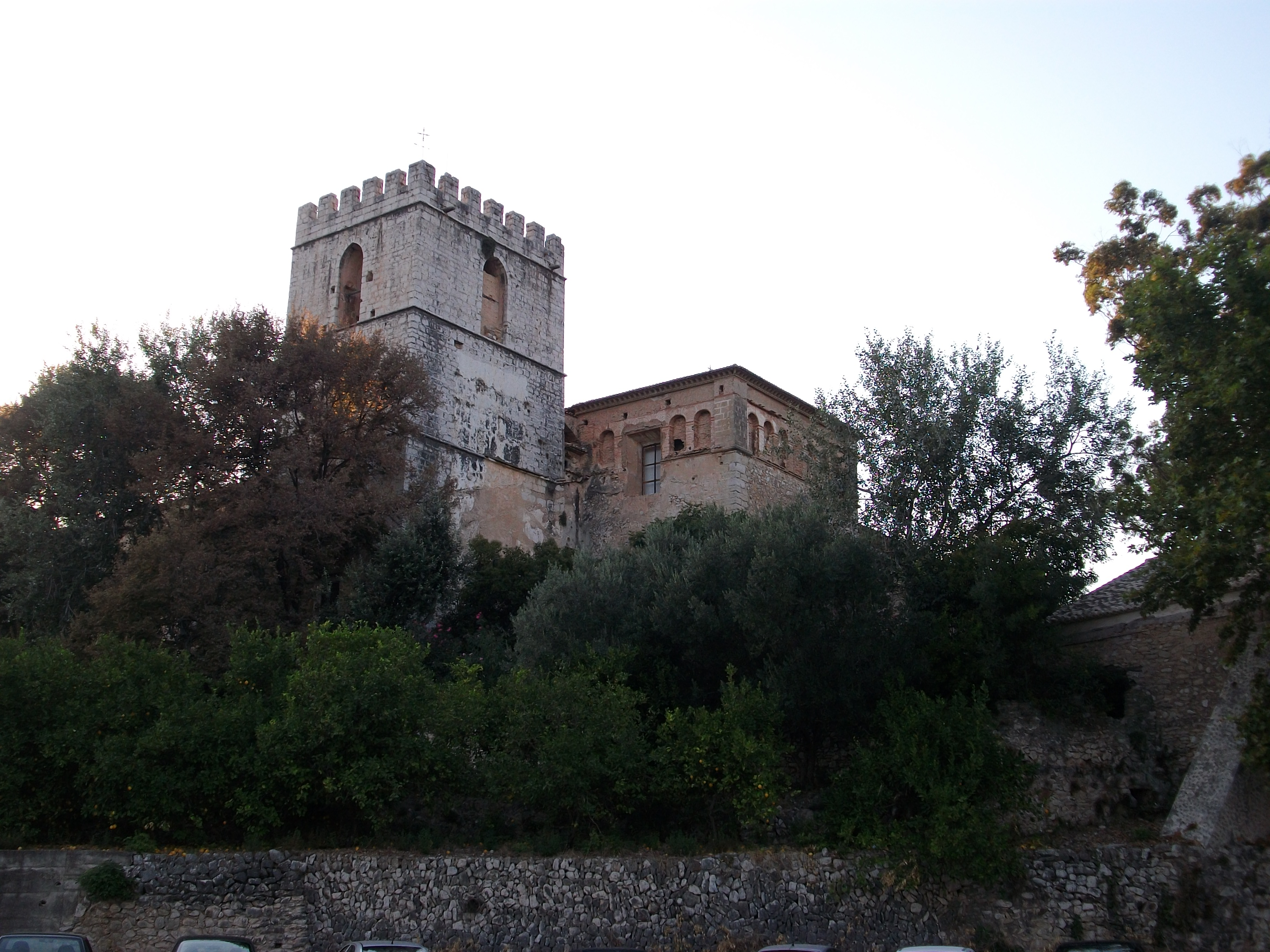
Main or Bell tower, of Valencian Gothic style, 15th century.

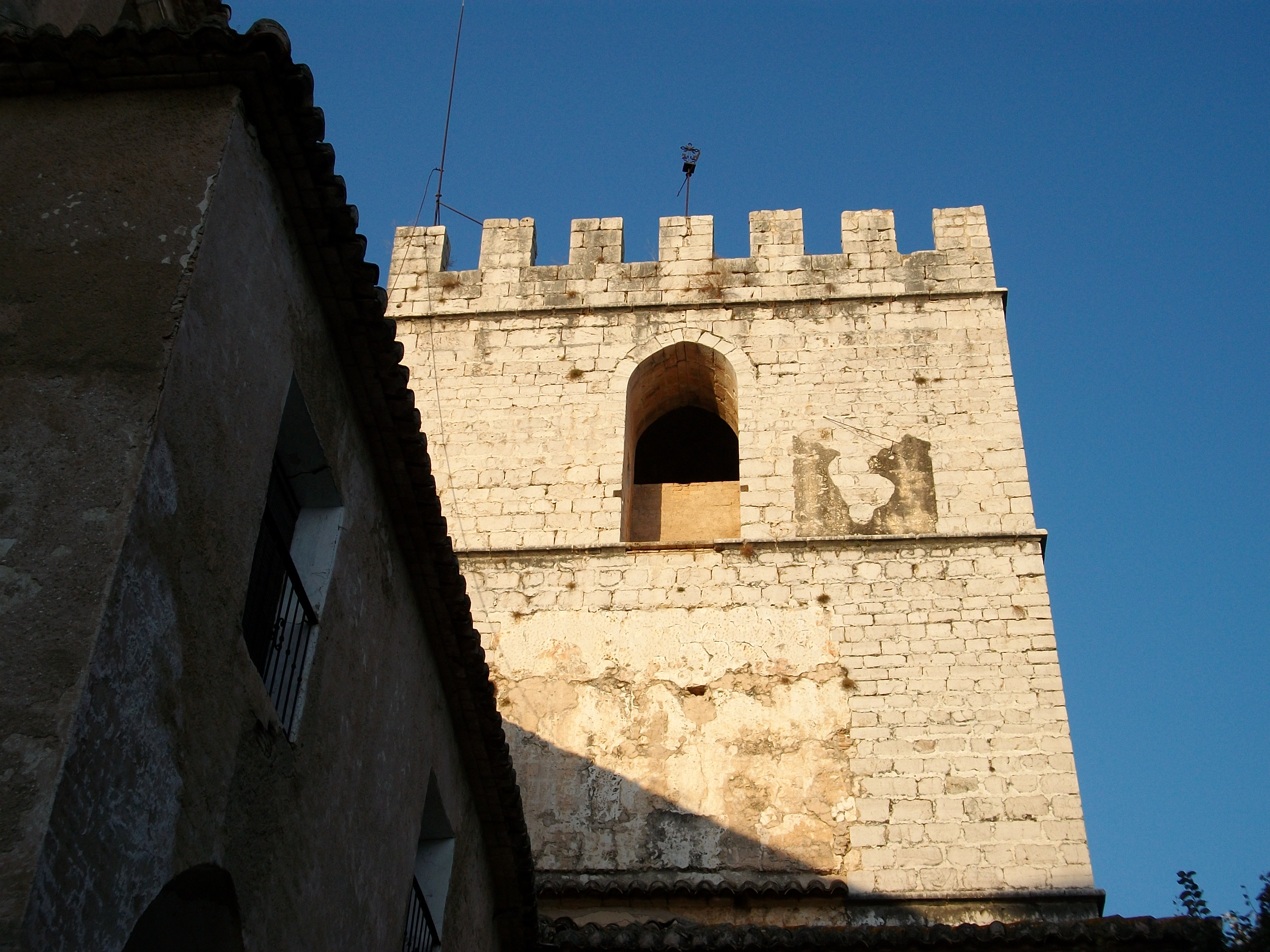
Detail of the Main or Bell tower, Valencian Gothic style, 15th century.

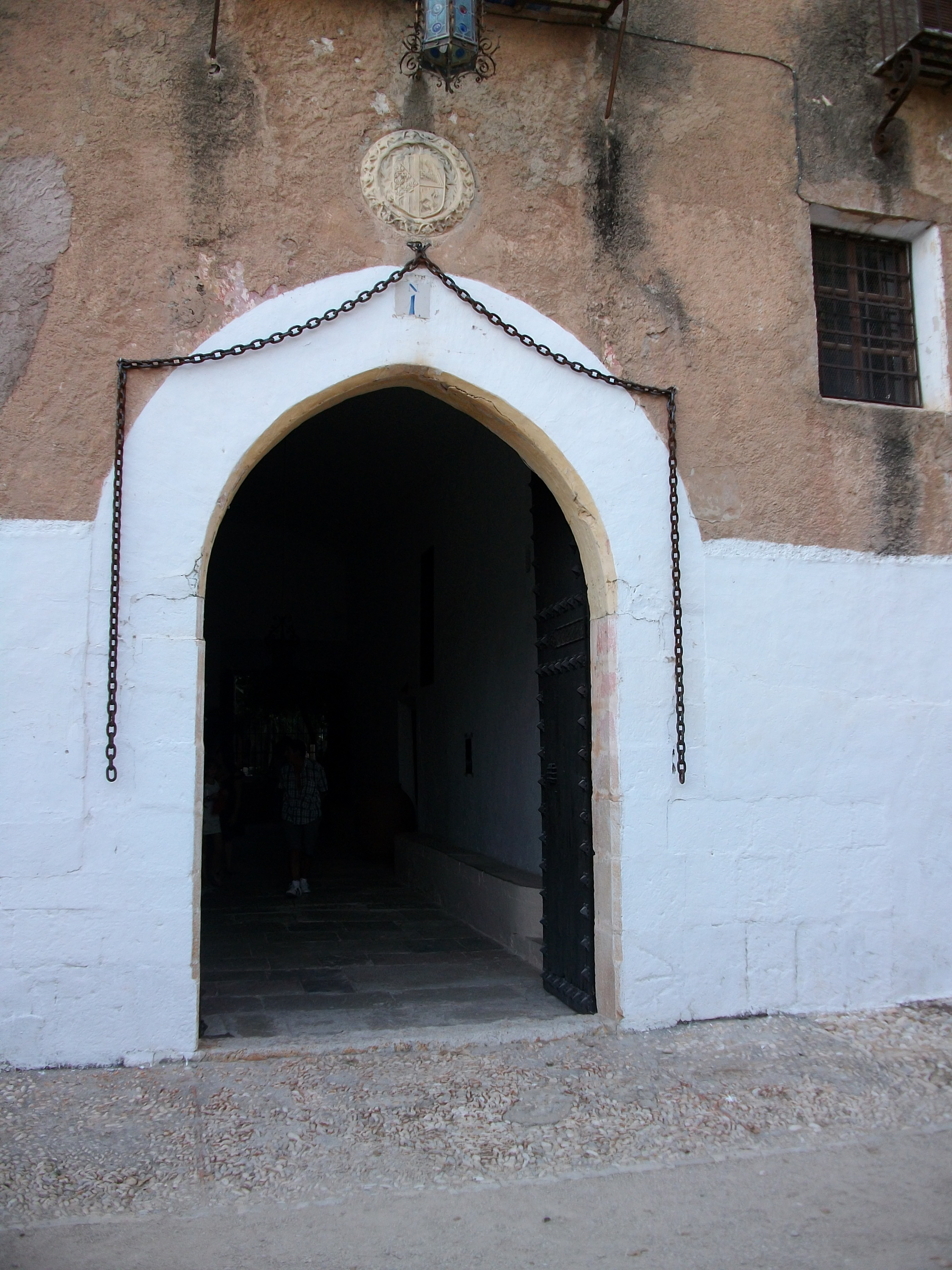
Main gateway of the Monastery.

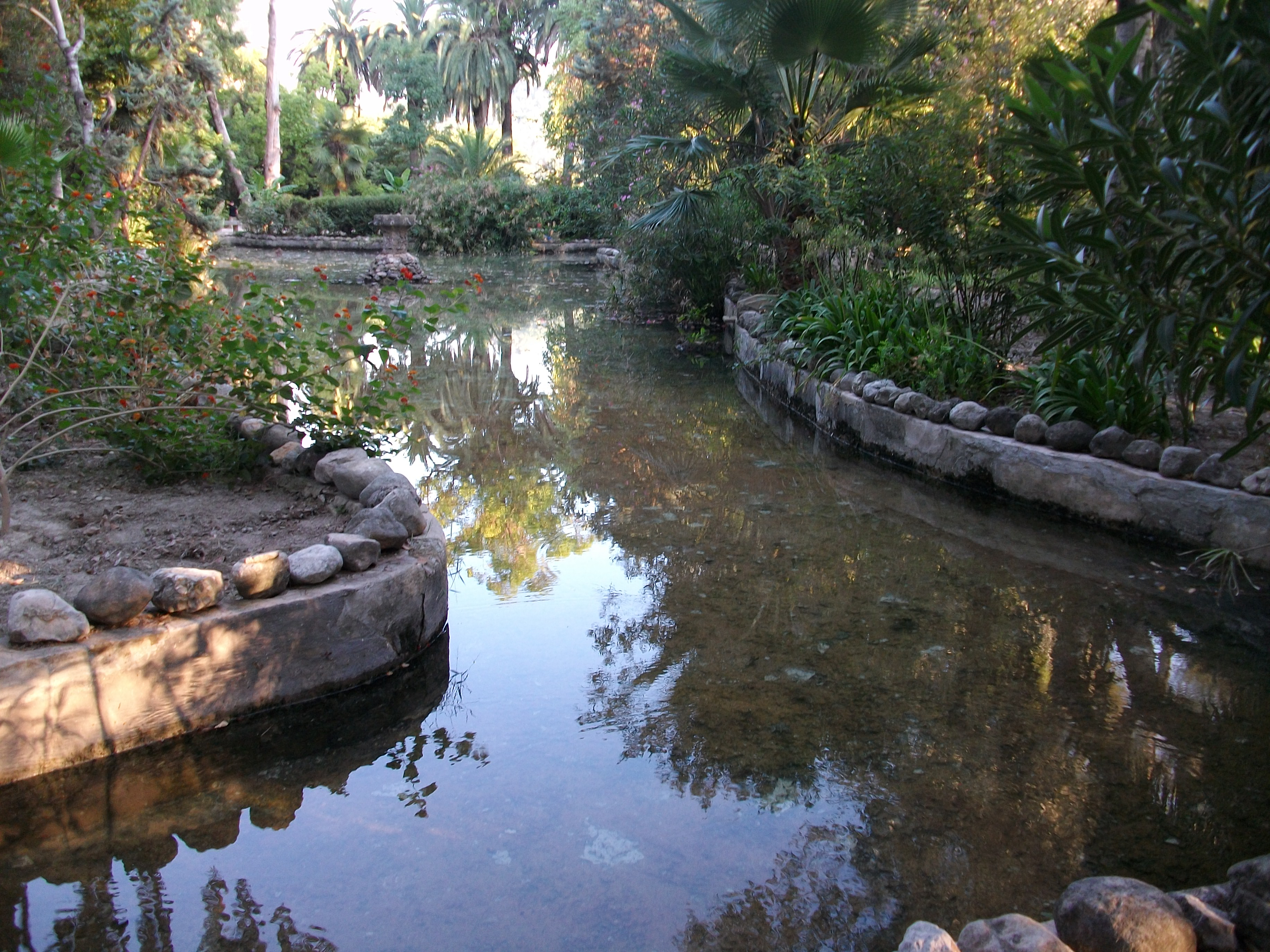
Romantic gardens of the monastery.

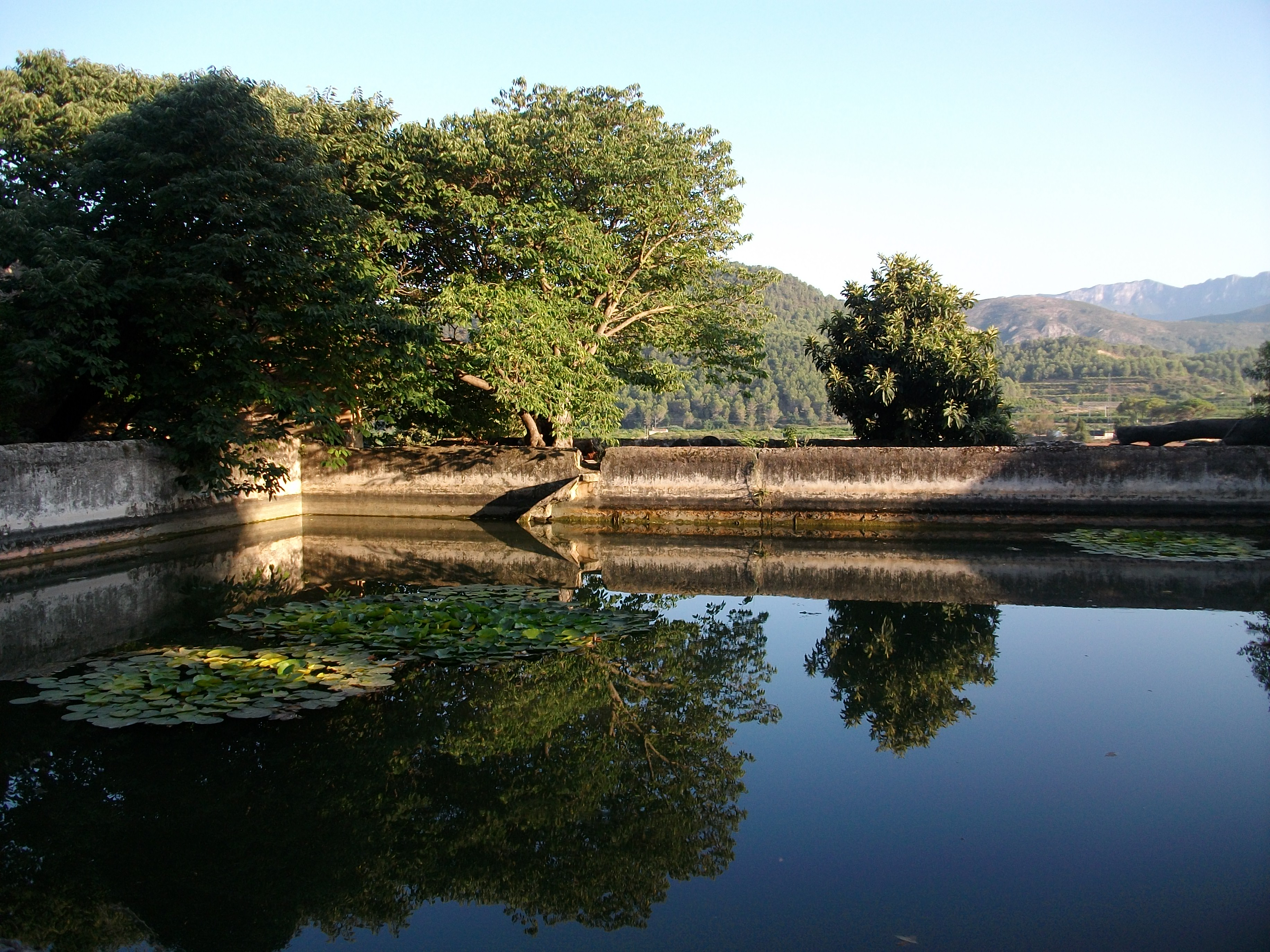
Agricultural raft next to the romantic gardens of the monastery.

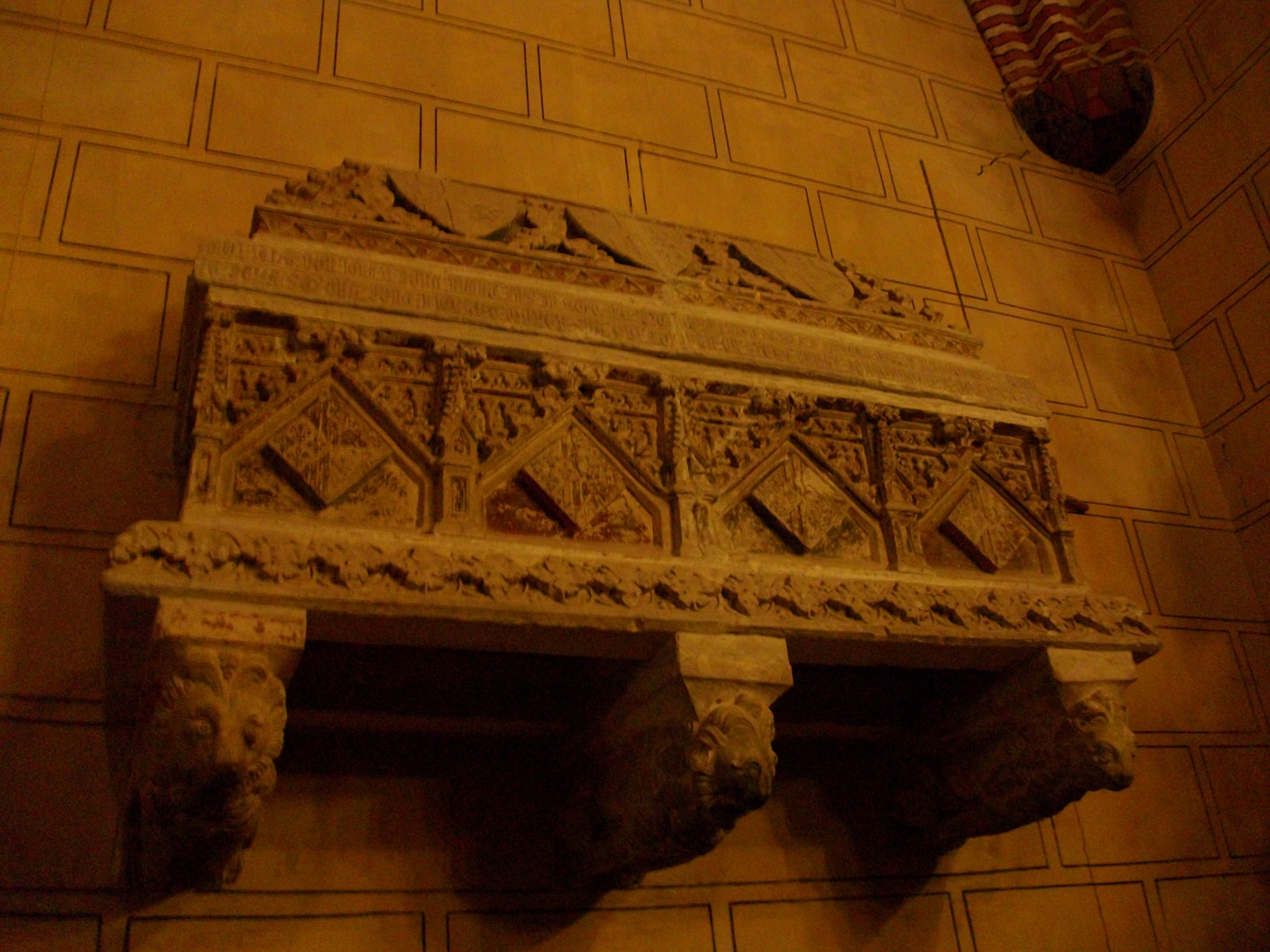
Medieval sarcophagus of the Duke's children Alfonso of Aragón and Foix, 14th century.

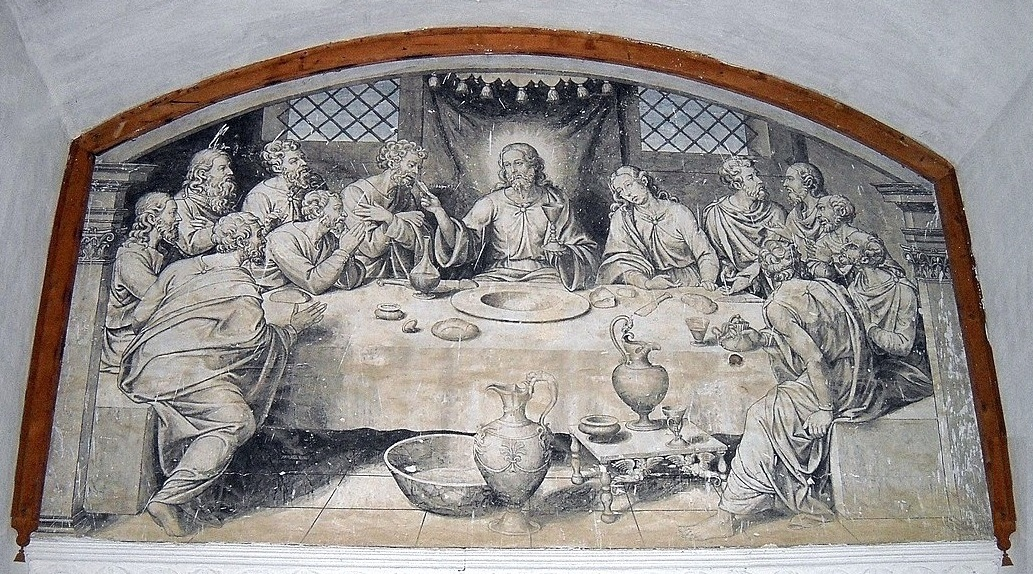
The Last Supper painted in fresco by Nicolás Borrás at the Monastery's refectory, 16th century.

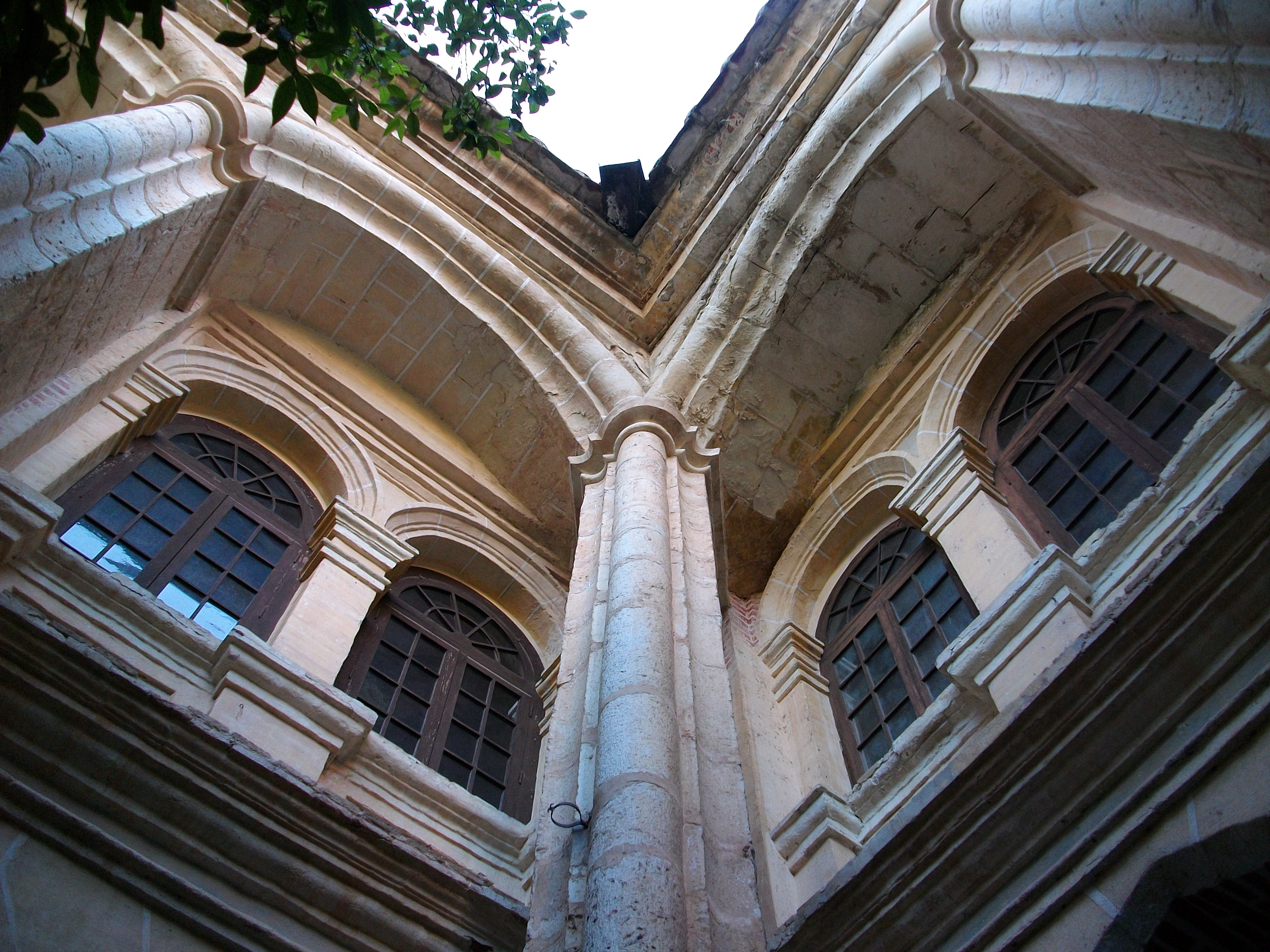
Windows of the upper cloister.

The Monastery of Sant Jeroni de Cotalba (Valencian pronunciation: [ˈsaɲ dʒeˈɾɔni ðe koˈtalba]; Spanish: San Jerónimo de Cotalba, "Saint Jerome of Cotalba") is a monastic building of Valencian Gothic, Mudéjar, Renaissance, Baroque and Neoclassical styles constructed between the 14th and 18th centuries, located in the municipal area of Alfauir, (Valencia), Spain, about 8 km. from the well-known city of Gandia.

== History ==
The monastery of Sant Jeroni de Cotalba is one of the most historic monastic constructions in Valencia and located near Alfauir, a village about eight kilometres outside Gandia.

It has its origin in Xàbia. In 1374 Pope Gregory XI authorized the foundation of a monastery to the hermit of Xàbia, who belonged to the Hiernymite order. The duke Alfonso of Aragon granted the grounds to the building. The monastery was attacked by pirates in 1387. Therefore, the monks feared to return there. For that reason in 1388 Alfonso of Aragon bought the territories of Cotalba from the Muslims, which were more protected and he donated them to the Hieronmyte monks of Xàbia. They moved to Cotalba and Alfonso of Aragon founded the monastery in 1388. In 1388 Alfonso of Aragon and Foix, Royal Duke of Gandia, constructed a fortress to protect the monastics from attacks by Berber pirates. Tradition claims Saint Vincent Ferrer preached publicly from the monastery. The father, Pere March, and the two wives of the well-known Valencian medieval poet Ausiàs March are buried in this monastery.

In the 16th century the monastery came under the protection of the House of Borgia. The Duchess of Gandia, Maria Enriquez de Luna, widow of the duke Giovanni Borgia and daughter-in-law of the Pope Alexander VI, financed the monastery's enlargement such as the upper cloister of late Gothic style or the medieval cistern of the Orange Tree Patio. Later, also Saint Francis Borgia frequented the monastery and his wife, Leonor de Castro, lady and intimate friend of the Empress Isabella of Portugal, spent her last days in it recovering from her ailments, where she died on March 27, 1546.

Spanish Renaissance painter Nicolás Borrás was so impressed by his stay at the monastery, he asked for membership in the order has his only payment. He was born in Cocentaina (Alicante). He was a pupil of Juan de Juanes. He is one of the best artists of Valencian monastic painting. The Hieronymite monks of Cotalba called him to paint the greater altarpiece of the church. In this way, he entered in the order. The altarpiece consisted in fourteen tables. There was a sculpture of Saint Jerome in the middle. In addition, he made other altarpieces for the chapels of the church and the chapterhouse. Also he produced paintings for different parts of the monastery. He painted four great linens for the stations of the low cloister. However, the only work conserved in its original place was The Saint Supper painted in fresco. It is placed in what nowadays is known as the oil mill, that originally was the dining hall (refectory). He took the habit in 1575, and professed final vows the following year. He passed the rest of his life painting, leaving twelve altarpieces in the church alone, and spent his own money to hire sculptors and builders for the monastery's embellishment.

The Ecclesiastical Confiscations of Mendizábal sold off the religious buildings to pay state debts. The monks left the monastery on August 6, 1835. In 1843, it was acquired by the Trénor family and remains in their bands until today. The Trénor family has owned it since 1843, although it became a military hospital temporarily during the Spanish Civil War.

In 1994, the monastery was declared as an item of cultural interest (BIC), and is now being restored. The doors were opened to the public on May 26, 2005. The restoration work has been carried out on the area behind the church's retable and Nicolas Borrás painting gallery. Nowadays, most of the monastery is open to visitors.

== Architecture ==
The construction of the monastery began in the 14th century and continued through the 16th century, though its current layout dates from reconstruction in the 17th and 18th centuries. The main facade is overlooked by the main and priory towers. The gothic church has a rectangular ground plan with one aisle and chapels between buttresses, as well as Baroque elements from the 18th-century renovation. The most significant areas on the upper floor are the presbytery and the choir.

The bell tower's facade features 17th-century blue and white carvings, and includes the founder's date and name in Valencian. The cloister is arranged in four galleries on two floors encircling a garden. The lower cloister includes arches and vaults in two-coloured Mudéjar style reminiscent of the Córdoba mosque. The sala capitular houses the remains of Prince John and Princess Blanche of Aragon, children of the mediaeval Duke Alfonso the Old.

=== Sections of the monastery ===
- The Entry's main door: The main entry of the monastery has a ceramic where Saint Jerome appears writing the Vulgata. At the top, we can see the stone shield of Duke Alfonso of Aragon. There appears the crown, the bars of Aragon's crown, the lis flower (symbol of the French royalty), the lion and an arm of an eagle with a sword.
- The Cotalba village: When we cross the main door, there is a pre-existent Moorish village to the right we can see a tower of square form. It is the oldest construction of the building. The houses, next to the moorish tower, were built two centuries ago.
- The Main or bell tower is of rectangular form, whose walls are made with ashlar masonry. The tower is divided in four parts by means of moldings. The bell was in the last floor. It has four pointed arcs that finishes with battlements. The inaugural stone is placed in this tower, it is written with Gothic letters and in old Valencian.
- Main façade: The main front of the monastery has two towers: The Main tower and the prior's tower. When the church was reformed in the 18th century, a porch was constructed to reinforce the front. The façade is divided in three floors plus a loft. Two doors stand out. One of them is the main door to go into the monastery. It has a pointed arch and on top of it, is placed the founder's shield. The other door goes into the church and it is located under the porch. It also has a pointed arch, which was cut in the walls by the use of the church as a wine cellar and warehouse. In the façade we can also see the balconies with bars on the first floor. They were made in the 18th century and they have ornamental tile in the ground.
- The church has a rectangular form with a single hall. There are chapels between each buttress. The presbytery is at the head and the choir at the back. The original church was of Valencian Gothic style. In the 18th century the hall was covered with a domed vault, as a baroque style. From the presbytery, there are two accesses to the Transagrario. This one has square form. It is covered by a "cupola with lantern", with floral decoration of baroque style. The pavement is of Valencian tile from the 17th century. The choir has two floors. In the low part, we find two sections, one of which is surrounded by two reduced arcs. The high choir of rectangular form has a vault with lunetos and shells in the corners. After the Ecclesiastical Confiscations of Mendizábal the pictorial works went to the Museum of Fine Arts of Valencia. The Monstrance went to the Collegiate Basilica of Gandia, the organ to the Pias Schools of the same city, the great bell went to Xeresa and the image of the Virgin of the Health was taken to the church of Rotova. The church became a warehouse.
- Cloister: The cloister has four galleries with two floors. The inferior part was built during 14th and 15th centuries. The high galleries were built between 15th and 18th centuries. In the cloister high and low, there are seven vaults with crossed arcs in each gallery, plus another one by each angle. We can see different phases of construction in the superior cloister. The four galleries form a central patio where there is a cistern, which stored the water for use of the monastery. Its construction was ordered by the Duchess of Gandia, Maria Enriquez de Luna, in the 16th century. In the low cloister, the pointed arcs are made with brick and lime mortar, in the manner of Mudéjar. In this way, the combination of the brick's colour with the target creates a two-colour pattern. The corbels and the keystones are made of stone. There is a spiral staircase in the southeastern angle. Next to it, there is a space with moulding, where one of Friar Nicolas Borras paintings were located. Three other paintings should be located in the other angles of the cloister. The superior South gallery is the oldest of the four. It was raised in the 15th century. In the south side the prioral cell was in the high floor. On the ground floor, the kitchen, the barber's and clother's were located.
- Chapterhouse: In the low part of the wing, we find the chapterhouse. Where the monks met to read the chapter. It is of square form with a vault of crossed arcs. It is of the first construction period. At the moment it is the chapel of the Virgin of the Health since it became the chapel for the cult of the proprietary family at the end of the 19th century. For that reason, they installed a neogothic altar, which has a copy of the Virgin of the Health of Rotova's church. There is also a gothic tomb of the Infants Juan and Blanca of Aragon, children of the Duke Alfonso of Aragon. It still preserves the rests of the painting. In the southwestern corner of the room, there is a spiral staircase, which goes up to the high cloister. It was constructed in the 16th century. It is of gothic style, made in plaster with floral decoration. Tiles of the steps also stand out.
- Oil mill: Is next to the chapter house. Originally, this room was divided in three spaces: the infirmary, oratory and the dining hall (refectory). The latter only conserves the distemper of Friar Nicolas Borras that represents The Saint Supper. This room became the oil mill in the last stage of the monastery. For that reason there are large earthen jars that were used to store oil.
- The Monstrance is the more remarkable gold work of the monastery. It was made by Friar Antonio Sancho de Benevento in 1548. It measured one meter in height. It was a piece in tower form, with numerous images with great detail. His quality and his technique was comparable to the monstrances of the Toledo Cathedral or the Santiago de Compostela Cathedral, being one of the best examples of the Spanish Renaissance gold work. After the Ecclesiastical Confiscations of Mendizábal the monstrance went to the Collegiate Basilica of Gandia. It was exhibited in the Barcelona International Exposition in 1929. It disappeared during the Spanish Civil War.
- High cloister: The east superior gallery was built in the 16th century by Maria Enriquez de Luna, Duchess of Gandia. It is made of stone with a gothic style. The arcs are closed by double windows. The north gallery is from the 17th century. There are double windows with columns of dôrico capital. The underground store and the wine and oil press were in the low part. The library and the archive were on the upper floor. The dining hall (refectory) was constructed in the west wing at the end of the 15th and beginning of the 16th century. The armoury was next to this room. The superior gallery is of the 18th century.
- Romantic gardens: We can access the garden from the square going into an irrigation pool. The Trénor family ordered to make a romantic garden in the style of the Nicolas Forestier made. This garden was made in the west side at the beginning of the 20th century. There are a variety of non-native trees and plants. It has a pool which receives water from a waterfall attached to the aqueduct. This serves to close the garden.
- Aqueduct: The aqueduct was constructed to provide the monastery with water in the 15th century. It saved the distance of five km and the topographic unevenness between source of Batlamala and the monastery. The aqueduct is divided in two heights, the inferior made of brick with pointed arches, the superior has the same type of arcs but of a smaller size.

== Tour routes and visitor information ==
The monastery now stands at the start of the Route of the Monasteries of Valencia (GR-236), a religious, cultural and tourist route established in 2008 to connect five monasteries located in central region of the Province of Valencia, (Valencian Community). It is also on the Route of the Borgias, a tourist route accessible by automobile.

Nowadays, it's possible to visit the majority of the building. The monastery's website includes scheduling information (updated visit schedule).

== Bibliography ==
- Este artículo incorpora texto del BIC incoado por la Consejería de Cultura de la Generalitat Valenciana
- es:Jesús Eduard Alonso López. Sant Jeroni de Cotalba: desintegració feudal i vida monàstica (segles XVIII y XIX). Gandía, CEIC Alfonso el Vell, 1988. ISBN 84-86927-00-5
- Fernando Mut Oltra y Vicente Palmer Terrades. Real Monasterio de San Jerónimo de Cotalba. Fernando Mut, Editor, Gandía, 1999. ISBN 84-605-9116-6
- Francisco Javier Delicado Martínez y Carolina Ballester Hermán. El Monasterio de Cotalba (Gandía). Una fundación Jerónima del Siglo XIV. University of Valencia.
- Arturo Zaragozá Catalán. Valencian Gothic Architecture. Valencia, Generalitat Valenciana, 2000, ISBN 978-84-482-2545-2
- Arturo Zaragozá Catalán. Memorias Olvidadas. Imágenes de la escultura gótica valenciana. Valencia, Generalitat Valenciana, 2015, ISBN 978-84-482-6017-0
- Mateo Gómez, Isabel, López-Yarto, Amelia y Prados García, José María, El arte de la Orden Jerónima: historia y mecenazgo, Madrid, Encuentro, 2000, ISBN 978-84-7490-552-6 pp. 281–284.

== See also ==
- Route of the Monasteries of Valencia
- Route of the Borgias
- Route of the Valencian classics
- PR-CV 100 (Route of the Monastery of Sant Jeroni de Cotalba)
- Dukes of Gandía
- Alfonso of Aragon and Foix
- Ausiàs March
- Pere March
- House of Borgia
- Maria Enriquez de Luna
- Nicolás Borrás
- Antonio Sancho de Benevento
- Leonor de Castro Mello y Meneses
- Hieronymites
- Saint Vincent Ferrer
