= Lady of the House =

Lady of the House may refer to:

- Lady of the House (1949 film) (Sitt al-Bayt), an Egyptian film
- Bariwali (The Lady of the House), a 2000 Bengali film
- The Lady of the House, original name of the Irish Tatler founded in 1890, see Tatler
- Lady of the House, a 1966 autobiography by Sally Stanford
  - Lady of the House (1978 film), a television movie adaptation directed by Ralph Nelson
- Lady of the House, a Detroit, MI restaurant owned by Kate Williams

== See also ==
- Mistress (form of address), an old form of address that implies "lady of the house"
