= Alfauir =

Alfauir Alfahuir
- Municipality
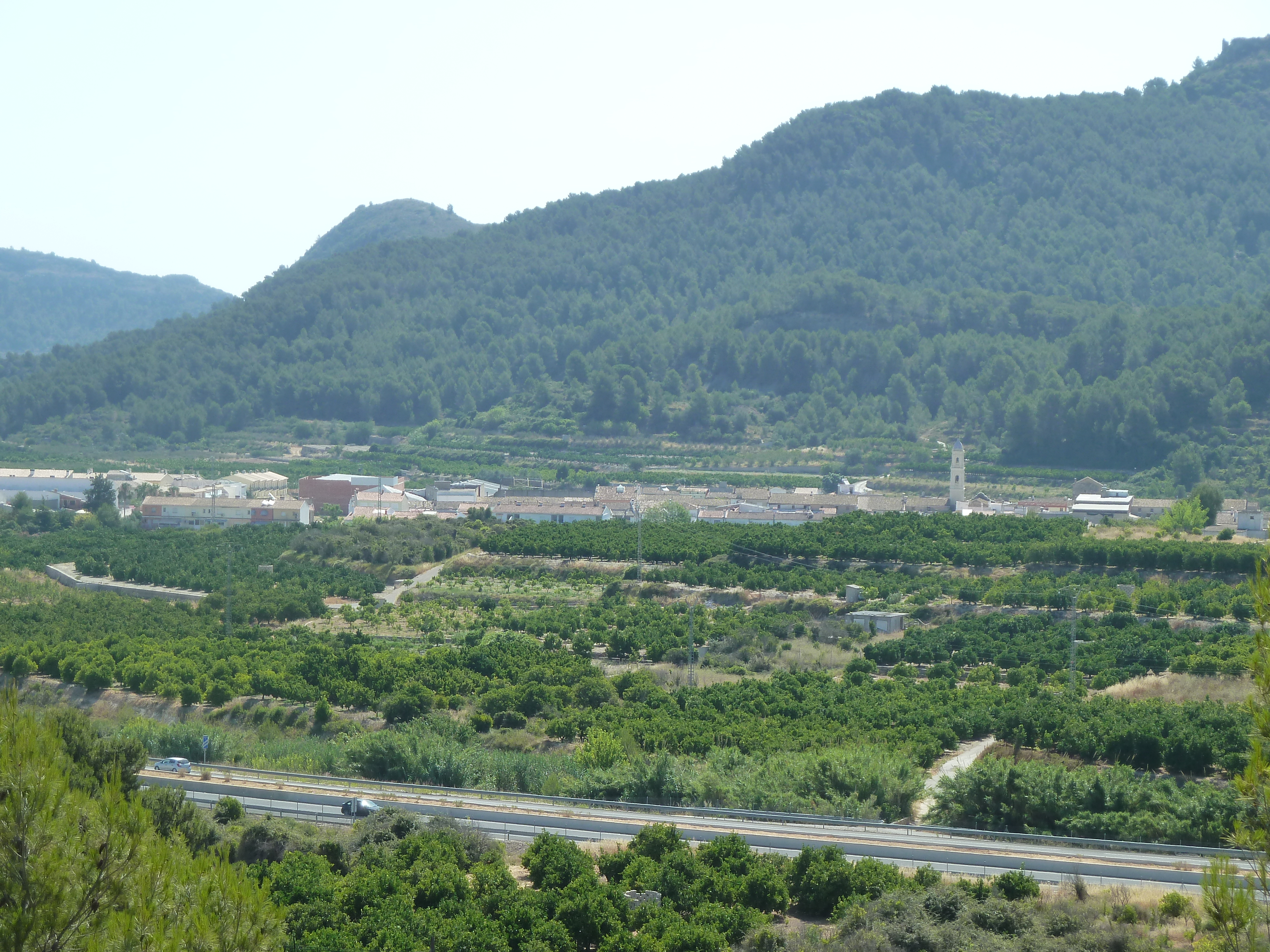

- Flag Coat of arms

- Location in Spain Alfauir (Valencian Community) Alfauir (Spain)
- Coordinates: 38°55′40″N 0°15′9″W
- Country: Spain
- Autonomous community: Valencian Community
- Province: Valencia
- Comarca: Safor
- Judicial district: Gandia

Government
  - Alcalde: Marcos García Tudela (PSPV)

Area
  - Total: 6.2 km^{2} (2.4 sq mi)
- Elevation: 75 m (246 ft)

Population (2025-01-01)
  - Total: 515
  - Density: 83/km^{2} (220/sq mi)
- Demonyms: Alfauirenc, alfauirenca
- Time zone: UTC+1 (CET)
  - Summer (DST): UTC+2 (CEST)
- Postal code: 46725
- Official language(s): Valencian
- Website: Official website

Alfauir (Valencian: [alfaˈwiɾ]; Spanish: Alfahuir [alfaˈwiɾ]) is a municipality in the comarca of Safor in the Valencian Community, Spain.

== Main sights ==
- Monastery of Sant Jeroni de Cotalba, constructed between the 14th and 18th centuries.
- Church of the Mare de Déu del Roser, 20th century.
- Palma Castle, 11th century.

== People ==
- Salvador Cardona, a professional road racing cyclist. In 1929 he became the first Spanish road bicycle racer to win a stage in Tour de France.
- Nicolás Borrás, a Spanish Renaissance painter and monk of the Monastery of Sant Jeroni de Cotalba.
- Antonio Sancho de Benevento, a silversmith artist of the Spanish Renaissance and monk of the Monastery of Sant Jeroni de Cotalba.

== See also ==
- Monastery of Sant Jeroni de Cotalba
- Route of the Monasteries of Valencia
- Route of the Borgias
- Route of the Valencian classics
- List of municipalities in Valencia
