= Lady (sculpture) =

Sculpture by Jan Zach in Eugene, Oregon, U.S.

- The sculpture in 2015
- Artist: Jan Zach
- Type: Sculpture
- Medium: Steel
- Dimensions: 4.3 m (14 ft)
- Location: Eugene, Oregon, United States; 44.044776°N 123.077977°W

Lady is an outdoor sculpture by Jan Zach, installed outside the Jordan Schnitzer Museum of Art, between Prince Lucien Campbell Hall and Condon Hall, on the University of Oregon campus in Eugene, Oregon, in the United States. The 14-foot (4.3 m) painted steel sculpture was donated to the museum in 2014. It was commissioned by Inacio Peixoto, in memory of his wife, and marked Zach's final work. The sculpture was a work in progress when Zach died in 1986, but his former student Jerry Harpster was able to fabricate Zach's original vision.
