= Lady Bardales =

Peruvian police officer

- Born: November 29, 1982 (age 42); Peru
- Occupation: Former police officer
- Known for: Being wanted on corruption charges

Lady Bardales (born November 29, 1982) is a Peruvian police officer who worked for former president Alejandro Toledo in 2005. Bardales is a lieutenant in the Peruvian National Police and was assigned to protect President Toledo's wife.

== Background ==
Lady Bardales was sentenced for illegal enrichment but failed to appear in court, making her a fugitive of justice for several months. On July 2, 2008, she surrendered to the relevant authorities.

On September 23, 2008, Lady Bardales was released from prison, with all charges dropped due to lack of evidence.

== Personal life ==
In 2019, Bardales announced that she had become a born-again Christian and became engaged to be married.
