= Milord =

British title

Milord (French: [milɔʁ]) is a term for an Englishman, especially a noble, traveling in Continental Europe. The term was used in both French and English from the 16th century. It derives ultimately from the English phrase "my lord", which was borrowed into Middle French as millourt or milor, meaning a noble or rich man.

== History ==
The Middle French term millourt, meaning a nobleman or a rich man, was in use by around 1430. It appears to be a borrowing of the English phrase "my lord", a term of address for a lord or other noble. Later French variants include milourt and milor; the form milord was in use by at least 1610. It was reborrowed into English by 1598, in the sense of an English noble generally, or one travelling in Continental Europe more specifically. Today, the term is rarely used except humorously. "Milord" has also been used for an automotive bodystyle also known as a three-position convertible or Victoria Cabriolet.

The equivalent in Italian is milordo. In Greece, the equivalent was "O Lordos". Lord Byron, who was involved in the Greek War of Independence, was known as "O Lordos" (The Lord), or "Lordos Veeron" (as the Greeks pronounced it), causing things as varied as hotels, ships, cricket teams, roads and even suburbs to be called "Lord Byron" today.

The term provided the title for the 1959 French "Milord" sung by Edith Piaf.

== Alternative legal use ==
"Milord" (in this use generally pronounced as, and sometimes written as, "M'lud": /məˈlʌd/) is not used in legal settings in the United Kingdom anymore, instead the form of address for several types of judges is just "My Lord". Some courts in Canada and in India also use the phrase.

It is common to see (in television or film portrayals of British courtrooms) barristers addressing the judge as "M'lud". This was the usual pronunciation until about the middle of the twentieth century in courts in which the judge was entitled to be addressed as "My Lord". However, it is a pronunciation which is now obsolete and no longer heard in court.
