= Joan Ramon I of Cardona =

Catalan nobleman

Joan Ramon I Folc de Cardona, 2nd Count of Cardona (3 January 1375 – 11 April 1441), was a Catalan nobleman in the late Middle Ages. His titles included Count of Cardona and Viscount of Vilamur (Catalan: Comte de Cardona i vescomte de Vilamur).

== Biography ==
His parents were Hug I, 1st Count of Cardona, and his wife Beatriu d'Anglesola.

In 1396 Joan Ramon, heir of Cardona, was one of the magnates who went to Sicily to assist its new King, Martín. The young king soon granted him the investiture to the Admiralty previously held by his father. Upon the death of his father, the first count, Hug de Cardona, in 1400 he inherited the county of Cardona.

He inherited the title of Admiral of Aragon.

Joan Ramon, count of Cardona, was one of the generals of King Martin the Young in the Sardinian campaign. The campaign ended with the Battle of Sanluri in 1409.

During the interregnum of 1410–12 in the realm of the Crown of Aragon, count Joan Ramon and his brother Antoni de Cardona were the most notable leaders of the party of Jaume II, Count of Urgell, in the parliamentary processes. In 1412 they both lodged their protest against the way the delegates for the Compromis de Casp had been elected.

However, once the decision had been pronounced, choosing Ferran de Antequera as the new king of Aragon, the count Joan Ramon I was fervently loyal to the new dynasty and refused to collaborate with the Urgellist revolt of 1413. In 1418 count Joan Ramon I was the Ambassador of King Alfonso V of Aragon to the Church Council of Constance.

In 1423, Joan Ramon commanded a fleet of 22 galleys and eight big ships, assisting Aragonese king Alfonso V of Aragon, (1395 - king of Aragon and Sicily 1416 - king of Naples "manu militari" between 1434 - 1458), who was besieged in Naples. On his return home, he took the French city of Marseille. For his actions, his family was awarded in 1463 by Alfonso V of Aragon's brother, King John II of Aragon (ruled 1458 - 1479), the Sicilian town of Alì Terme.

After 1436, count Joan Ramon I retired to Cardona.

== Cultural achievements ==
For the occasion of the wedding of his son Joan Ramon II with Joana de Prades, the elderly count authored a beautiful letter of advice and instructions.

== Family ==
At the age of 16 years, Joan Ramon I was married to a young lady from the Royal House, by name Joana de Arago de Gandia, in 1391. She was daughter of Alfonso I, Duke of Gandia and his wife Violant de Arenos. Countess Joana died in 1419. Their adult children were:

- Joan Ramon II (1400-1471), his successor as Count of Cardona
- Hug de Cardona i Gandia (1405-1470)
- Joana de Cardona
- Jaume de Cardona i de Gandia (1405-1466), bishop of Vic (1445-1459) and President of the Generalitat de Catalunya from 1443 to 1446
- Elionor de Cardona, she embarked in 1451 to Sardinia for marriage with the Marquess of Oristany
- Pere de Cardona
