= Bernardo Pérez de Chinchón =

Valencian Catholic writer

Bernardo Pérez de Chinchón (c.1488/93 – 1556?) was a Valencian Roman Catholic writer.

Pérez de Chinchón translated Erasmus into Castilian. Employed by Juan de Borja, 3rd Duke of Gandía, he also wrote works of Christian apologetics directed against Islam.

== Works ==
- (tr.) Erasmus, Silenos de Alcibíades (Adagia), Valencia: Jorge Costilla, 1528
- Libro llamado Antialcorano: que quiere dezir contra el Alcoran de Mahoma, Valencia, 1532
- Diálogos christianos contra la secta mahomética y contra la pertinacia de los judíos, Valencia: Francisco Díaz Romano, 1535.
