= Hugo I, Duke of Gandia =

Duke of Gandía (1425-1433)

Hugo Folch of Cardona and Gandía, known as "the Navarrese" (~1405 - ~1470) was Duke of Gandía (1425-1433) and gentleman of Guadalest. He was son of Joan Ramon I, Count of Cardona and Joana of Gandía. In 1422, he temporarily inherited the Señoría of Ondara and Duchy of Gandia, due to the death without heirs of his maternal uncle Alfonso II, Duke of Gandia. In 1433, as agreed, Hugo de Cardona had to cede the Duchy of Gandia to the infante Juan of Aragon, the future John II of Aragon.

== Biography ==
Gandia was very active in the sugar industry. Hugo of Cardona possessed the monopoly to exploit sugar in Gandia. He sold the business during the second half of the 15th century to the stockists of the Magna Societas Alemannorum of Ravensburg.

From his mother he inherited, Calasanz and Sanui in Ribagorza, and Guadalest and Confrides in the Kingdom of Valencia. He received the barony of Guadalest in the inheritance of his mother. In 1424 he joined the king Alfonso V of Aragon in the Kingdom of Naples. He established himself in Valencia, where he litigated with his son Juan. In 1427 Hugo de Cardona married Blanca of Navarre, lady of Caparrosso, Aézcoa, Carazar and Caseda, daughter of Juana of Navarra who was a natural daughter of King Charles II of Navarre.

With this wife he had four children:

- Juan of Cardona and of Navarra baron of Guadalest and High Steward of King Charles III of Navarre.
- Beatriz of Cardona.
- Onofre of Cardona, baron of Guadalest, married Beatriu Bou, of the family Bou, gentlemen of Callosa and Tàrbena.
