= Girolama Borgia =

Illegitimate daughter of Rodrigo Borgia, Pope Alexander VI

- Born: 1469
- Died: 20 January 1483 (aged 13–14)
- Spouse: Giovanni Andrea Cesarini (m. 1481)
- Father: Rodrigo Borgia

Girolama Borgia (Catalan: Jerónima de Borja; 1469 – 20 January 1483) was an illegitimate daughter of Cardinal Rodrigo Borgia, later Pope Alexander VI.

Arms of the House of Borgia

== Biography ==
Girolama Borgia was born in Rome in 1469 to Cardinal Rodrigo Borgia and an unmarried woman whose identity is unknown, who was Borgia's lover before of his most famous mistress Vannozza Cattanei. She was the third child of Borgia, after her half-siblings Pedro Luis and Isabella. Her younger half-siblings were the most famous children of Borgia, birth by Vannozza Cattanei: Cesare, Giovanni "Juan", Lucrezia and Goffredo "Joffre" Borgia.

Girolama did not receive from her father the titles and wealth that he granted to Vannozza's children when he became Pope, but he recognized her as his daughter, as evidenced by her marriage certificate, and guaranteed her an income sufficient for a comfortable life.

In 1481 she was given in marriage to Giovanni Andrea Cesarini, a Roman aristocrat.

She died in Rome on 20 January 1483 (aged 13-14). In the same year Giovanni Andrea died also.
