= Joan II =

Joan II may refer to:

- Joan II, Countess of Burgundy (1292–1330), Queen of France by marriage to Philip V
- Joan II, Countess of Dreux (1309 – 1355), only child of John II of Dreux
- Joan II of Navarre (1312–1349), Queen of Navarre
- Joan II, Countess of Auvergne (1378 – c. 1424), Sovereign Countess of Auvergne and Boulogne
- Joan II of Naples (1373–1435), Queen of Naples

== See also ==
- Joan Ramon II, Count of Cardona (1400–1471), Catalan nobleman
