= Joan I =

Joan I or Joanna I may refer to:

- Joan I, Countess of Burgundy (1191–1205)
- Joan I of Navarre (1271–1305), daughter of King Henry I of Navarre and Blanche of Artois
- Joan I, Countess of Auvergne (1326–1360)
- Joanna I of Naples (1328–1382)
- Joan I, Countess of Dreux (1345 – 1346), only child of Peter, Count of Dreux
- Joanna of Castile (1479–1555), a.k.a. Joanna I or Juana I, Queen of Castile and Aragon, daughter of Isabella I of Castile and Ferdinand II of Aragon

== See also ==
- Joan Ramon I, Count of Cardona (1375-1441), Catalan nobleman
