= Miquelot de Prades =

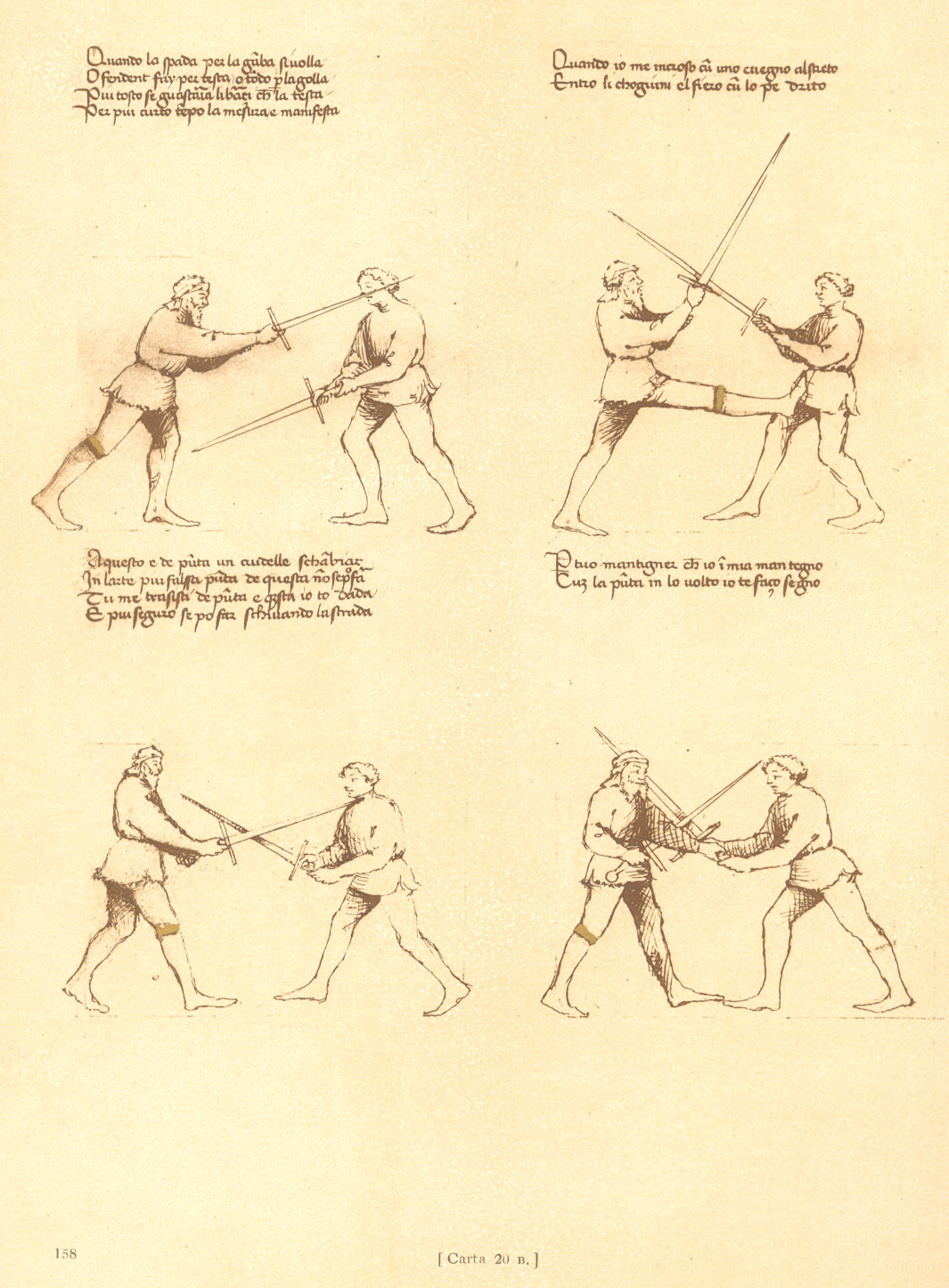

Miquel de Prades ( Balaguer ?, 1462? - Belvedere Marittimo coast 1505), known by the name of Miquelot de Prades, was a Catalan soldier famous for his skill with the sword and various military deeds. There is no certain evidence that confirms whether three documented facts (about a fencer, about a murderer and about a soldier who died at sea) can be attributed to the same person.

== Documented facts ==
=== Assassination of Joan Borja in Rome ===
The historian Jerónimo Zurita explains the assassination of Giovanni Borgia, son of Alexander VI in Rome, in the year 1497. The death was attributed to Michalot de Prats, who was at the service of the victim.

=== Famous fencer in Italy and Montserrat ===
Gonzalo Fernández de Oviedo y Valdés, in his work Las Quinquagenas de la nobility de España, spoke of a Catalan soldier (Michalot de Pradas) who roamed Italy, winning all the duels with a sure thrust to the opponent's neck. Repentant of his life, that soldier went to take refuge in the monastery of Montserrat. One bad day an Italian soldier with two swords showed up and challenged Miquelot (saying that he wanted to see the secret thrust, claiming that he would know how to counter it). Miquelot flatly refused to fight but the other's insistence forced him to do so. The Italian ended up dead, with a thrust to the neck. There was probably no better way to teach him. Repentant of the new death, he went to Rome to ask for forgiveness. The pope incorporated him into his troops.

- There is no document that indicates the type of sword used by Miquelot and his opponents. It could be either a broadsword (rigid and heavy) or a flexible and relatively light sword.

=== Soldier at the service of the Pontiff ===
There is a Michalot de Prats who with an armed caravel in Naples chased and made some corsairs flee near Belvedere Marittimo (a priori, without any relationship, with the previous events). Michalot's ship, some ships that accompanied him and the captured privateers suffered a sudden storm and sank (year 1505). All the crew were drowned.
