= Pier Luigi de Borgia, 1st Duke of Gandía =

1st duke of Gandía and son of Pope Alexander VI

- Duke of Gandía
- Coat of arms
- Tenure: 1485 – 1488
- Predecessor: None
- Successor: Giovanni Borgia
- Born: c. 1468
- Died: 3 September 1488 (aged 19–20)
- Noble family: House of Borgia
- Father: Pope Alexander VI

Pier Luigi de Borgia, 1st Duke of Gandía (Spanish: Pedro Luis de Borja, Catalan: Pere Lluís de Borja, Latin: Petrus Ludovicus de Boria; c. 1468 – 3 September 1488) was the illegitimate son of Cardinal Rodrigo Borgia (later Pope Alexander VI) and a member of the House of Borgia. He was the first duke of Gandía, a duchy in the Kingdom of Valencia that King Ferdinand II of Aragon re-established in 1485 as a favour to his father.

== Life ==
Pier Luigi de Borgia was probably born around 1468. In the bull of his legitimation, on 5 November 5 1481, Sixtus IV speaks of him as Adolescente Romano, declaring him to be the son of Cardinal-Deacon Rodrigo Borgia and a freewoman (de tune Diacono Cardinali et soluta). He was a half-brother of Isabella Borgia and Girolama Borgia, born by unknown mothers, and Cesare Borgia, Giovanni Borgia, Lucrezia Borgia and Gioffre Borgia, all born by Vannozza dei Cattanei.

The duchy of Gandía was initially created for Pier Luigi. However, even before becoming the duke of Gandía, he purchased the large estates in the area through a financial agreement with local nobles Andrés de Cabrera, Marquis of Moya, and his wife, Beatriz de Bobadilla. Through this agreement, Pier Luigi was required to provide the marquis an unknown sum, albeit considered small, and accept certain rights pertaining to the crown and of Valencia over the lands of the duchy. Some sources state that Pedro Luis' father gave him 50,000 ducats in order to purchase the territory. In late 1485, King Ferdinand II officially elevated Pier Luigi's status to Duke of Gandía.

Pier Luigi Borgia fought alongside the Spanish armies during the Granada War in the Reconquista. Following his heroic triumph during the Battle of Ronda, King Ferdinand II rewarded him with the title of 'grandee of Spain' on 18 May 1485.

Pier Luigi was promised to María Enríquez de Luna of the House of Enríquez. Due to his untimely death, she would later wed his younger brother Giovanni (also known as Juan) in September 1493.

In his will, Pier Luigi ceded the duchy to his younger brother Giovanni and left a dowry of 10,000 florins to his sister, Lucrezia.

== See also ==
- House of Borgia
- Route of the Borgias

Preceded by Ferdinand II of Aragon	Duke of Gandía; 1485 - 1488	Succeeded by Giovanni Borgia
