= Alfonso IV =

Alfonso IV may refer to:

- Alfonso IV of León (924–931)
- Afonso IV of Portugal (1291–1357)
- Alfonso IV of Aragon (1327–1336)
- Alfonso IV of Ribagorza (1332–1412)
- Alfonso IV d'Este (1634–1662), Duke of Modena and Regg
