= Isabel de Borja y Enríquez =

Italian-Spanish noblewoman (1498–1557)

Isabella Borgia Enriquez
- Arms of Borgia-Enriquez family, with the dukal crown
- Born: 15 January 1497; Gandia
- Died: 28 October 1557 (aged 59); Valladolid
- Burial: Valladolid, Convent of Saint Francis
- House: Borja
- Father: Juan Borgia, II Duke of Gandía
- Mother: Maria Enriquez de Luna

Francisca de Jesus

Ecclesiastical career
- Religion: Catholicism
- Ordained: 1512
- Writings: Spiritual Exhortations; De la imagen de Dios borrada, que es el alma del pecador
- Offices held: abbess of the Convent of Santa Clara of Gandia

Isabella Borgia Enriquez (Spanish: Isabel de Borja y Enríquez; Catalan: Isabel Borja Enríquez; later known with her religious name Francisca de Jesus, Catalan: Francesca de Jesus; 15 January 1497 - 28 October 1557) was an Italian-Spanish noblewoman, religious and writer, daughter of Juan Borgia, II Duke of Gandia, illegitimate son of Pope Alexander VI, and Maria Enriquez de Luna.

== Biography ==
Isabella was born on 15 January 1497 at Gandia, by Juan Borgia, II Duke of Gandia an illegitimate son of Pope Alexander VI, and Maria Enriquez de Luna, a Spanish noblewoman. She was the second child of the couple after her brother Juan Borgia Enriquez; his father was soon murdered by unknown assailants in Rome.

She grew up in Spain with her mother, without contact with her paternal family: Maria accused her brother-in-law Cesare Borgia of the death of her husband, and her father-in-law Alexander VI of having covered up the fraticide. Isabella was educated in a humanistic program that included Latin, Greek, classical and religious literature. Having reached marriageable age, she was entrusted to the Monastery of Las Descalzas of Saint Colette, waiting to arrange a marriage for her, but when it was announced that she would marry the heir of the Duchy of Segorbe Isabella chose instead to take religious vows. She was initially opposed by her mother and the abbess, but Isabella physically resisted leaving the convent and finally managed to obtain permission to become a nun.

In 1512, she became a nun with the name Francisca de Jesus. After the ceremony, she donated 1,500 silver ducats to the monastery. According to her sisters, she was a woman of great virtues, elegant, kind, composed and pleasant, capable of discreetly advising and conversing amiably with anyone. She also stood out for her devotion to the Sacred Heart of Jesus.

In 1533 she was appointed abbess of the Convent of Santa Clara of Gandía, an office she held until 1548, when she decided to travel around Spain to preach, write and found new convents. Isabella convinced her mother, her nephew Francis and five of his sisters (religious name Mary of Crux, Jane Evangelist, Jane Baptist, Mary Gabriela and Jane of Crux), all children of her brother Juan, and Dorothea, daughter of Francis, to take vows. Isabella ordered all of them, except Francis, personally.

Isabella died in Valladolid on 28 October 1557, while working, together with Joanna of Habsburg, who had asked for her collaboration to found a monastery in which to retire, on the construction of Descalzas Reales in Madrid.

After long disputes over the possession of her body due to the possibility of her being sanctified, she was finally buried in the local convent of Sait Francis.

== Works ==
In addition to her epistolary, she wrote a collection of Spiritual Exhortations, printed in Madrid in 1616, and a religious treatise, De la imagen de Dios borrada, que es el alma del pecador, published together with the writings of hee nephew Francis Borgia.
