= Abdet =

Coordinates: 38°42′N 0°15′W

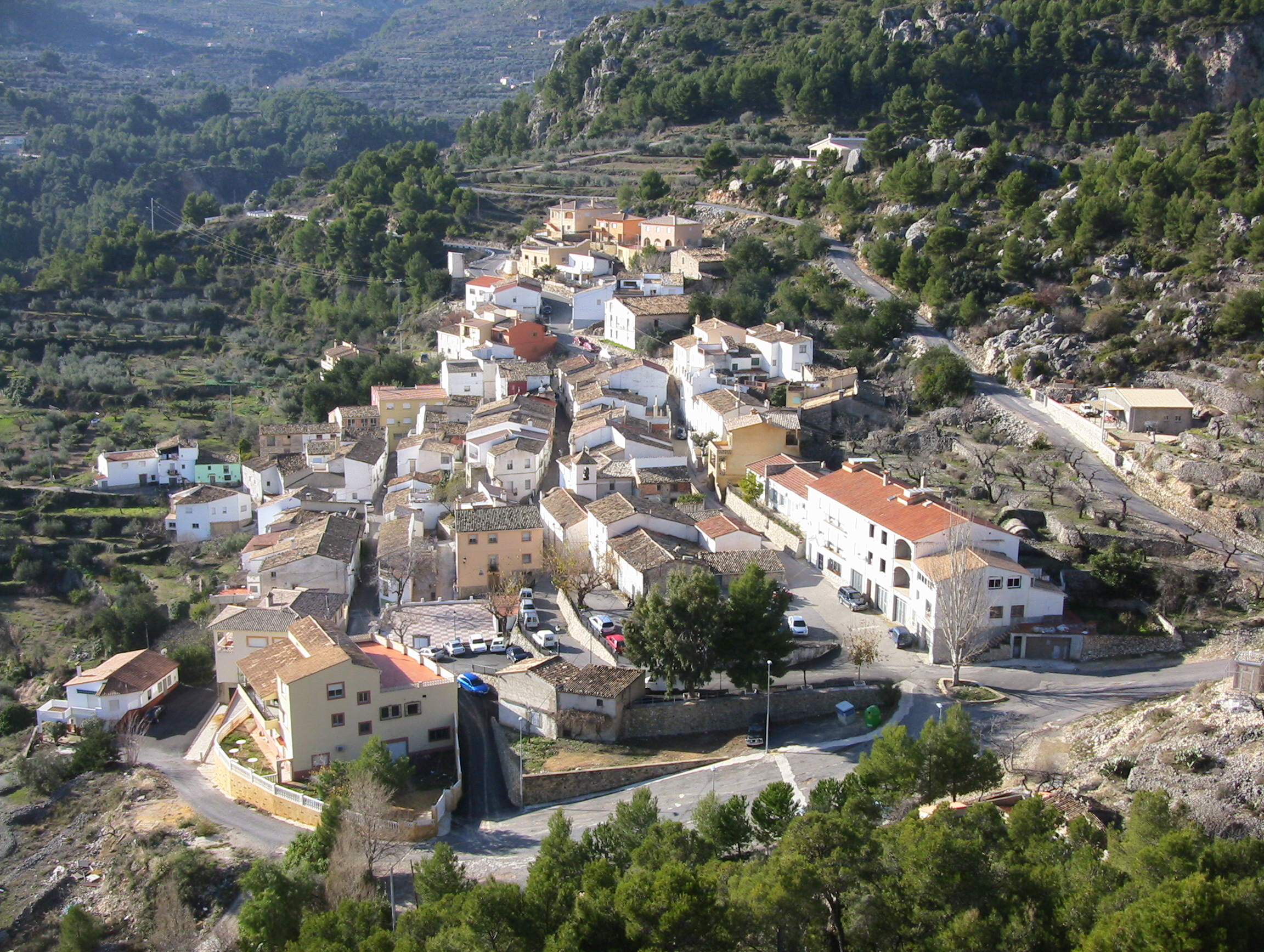
View of Abdet

Abdet (Valencian: [abˈdet], Spanish: [aβˈðet]) is a small village in the Guadalest Valley of the Costa Blanca, Valencian Community in Spain. It is a hamlet of Confrides.

== History ==
The population is primarily of Arab origin, as it was given to Vidal de Sarrià in 1264 by James I. The houses of Cardona and Ariza controlled it before the Muslims rebelled in 1526 against the order of conversion sent by Charles I. Battles against Castile recurred until 1609, when there was an evacuation to the shelter of the mountains of the Valley of Laguart, leaving only 12 houses occupied.

The town was later repopulated, and in the 18th century there were twenty-five houses. The complete municipality of Abdet and Confrides had 822 inhabitants. During recent centuries the population has decreased. During period 1960-1970 there was a 17% reduction, and during recent decades it has gone down to 50% of its 1960 population.

== Celebrations ==
Abdet has a Fiesta at Easter and also during August.

== Nature ==
Abdet has commanding views of the valley. It is a good base for walking and climbing, and also has a canyon, The Barranco de Meli, which is a popular canyon trip requiring ropes.

== Abdet's trinquet ==
Abdet has one of the oldest courtfields of the Valencian autochthonous sport, the pilota, dated of 1772, although it actually resembles a minor variant, galotxetes.
