= Jaume Cardona =

Co-Prince of Andorra and Bishop of Urgell

Jaume Francesc Folc de Cardona i de Gandia (1405-1 December 1466) was a Catholic cardinal.
He was Bishop of Vich (1445-1459), Girona (1459-1461) and Urgell (1461-1466), then in the Principality of Catalonia. He was chosen as a cardinal by Pope Pius II on 18 December 1461.

He was also the 22nd president of the Generalitat de Catalunya between 1443 and 1446.

== Biography ==
He was a son of Joan Ramon I, Count of Cardona and Joana of Gandía.

He was Canon and Archedian in Barcelona, perpetual administrator of the abbey of Santa Maria de Solsona and ecclesiastical deputy of the Deputation of the General of Catalonia. In 1445 he was appointed Bishop of Vich. He endorsed the election of Pope Nicholas V. In 1459 he was transferred to the Diocese of Girona and in 1461 to Urgell.

Pope Pius II created him cardinal in the consistory of 18 December 1461. Cardona never went to Rome to receive the cardinal cape and did not participate in the 1464 papal conclave (election of Paul II).
