= María Enríquez de Luna =

Duchess of Gandía (1474–1539)

María Enríquez of Luna
- Duchess of Gandía
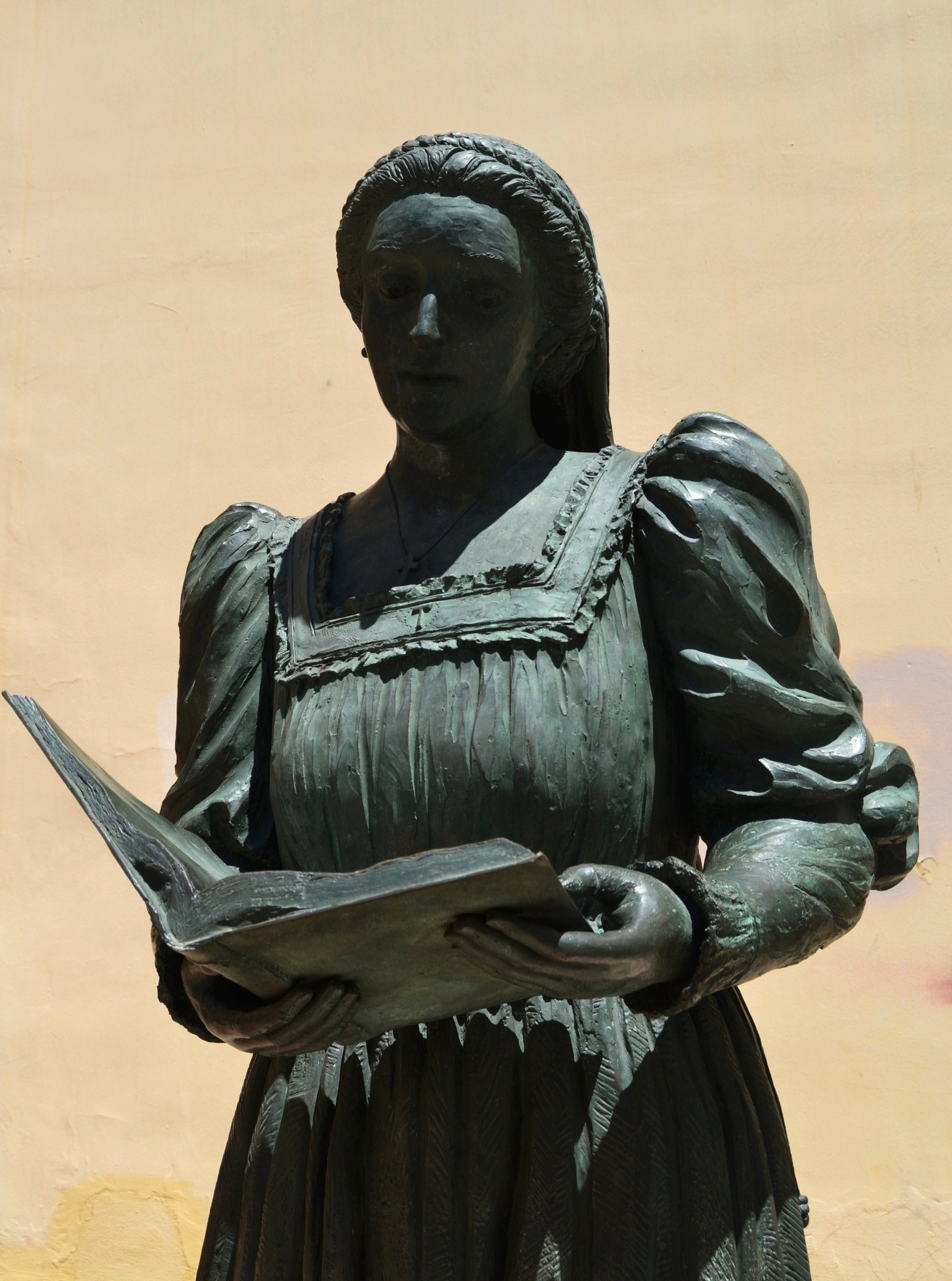
- Full name: María Enríquez de Luna
- Born: 1474; Spain
- Died: 1539 (aged 64–65); Gandía
- Buried: Gandía
- Noble family: House of Castile
- Spouses: Juan de Borja y Cattanei, 2nd Duke of Gandía
- Issue: Juan de Borja y Enríquez, 3rd Duke of Gandia; Isabel de Borja y Enríquez
- Father: Enrique Enríquez de Quiñones, Señor of Villada, Villavicencio, Orce and Baza
- Mother: María de Luna y Herrera

María Enríquez de Luna (1474 – 1539) was the wife of Juan (Giovanni) Borgia, second Duke of Gandía. Her father was, Enrique Enríquez de Quiñones, making her paternal grandfather Fadrique Enríquez. Her aunt, Juana Enríquez, was Queen of Aragon by marriage to John II of Aragon. Therefore, she was a first cousin of King Ferdinand II of Aragon. She married Juan somewhere between 1493 and 1494, and together, they had two children: Juan de Borja y Enríquez (known as Juan Borgia), who became the 3rd Duke of Gandía, and Isabel de Borja y Enríquez, who was born shortly after her father was killed and never knew him. The younger Juan was the father of Saint Francis Borgia. Isabel grew up to be abbess of Santa Clara in Gandía. In personality, María was very intelligent, devout, financially shrewd, and devoted to her husband and children, in contrast to her husband, who was regarded by many as a womanizer, a gambler, a drunkard, and an incompetent general.

Sometime after the end of Pope Alexander VI's papacy, María, along with her aunt Isabella of Castile, tried to press murder charges against her brother-in-law, Cesare Borgia for the alleged murder of her husband Juan.

== Bibliography ==
- Soler Salcedo, Juan Miguel (2008). Nobleza Española: grandeza inmemorial 1520. Visión Libros. ISBN 8498861799.
- Salazar y Acha, Jaime de (2010). «Una rama subsistente del linaje de Borja en la América española». Boletín de la Real Academia Matritense de Heráldica y Genealogía (75): pp. 16–17. OCLC 27332380.

== See also ==
- House of Borgia
- Monastery of Sant Jeroni de Cotalba
- Route of the Borgias
- Dukes of Gandía
- Enríquez
- Diario Borja - Borgia Tres siglos de Historia día a día
