= Alfonso II, Duke of Gandia =

Alfonso de Aragon and Eiximenis

Duke of Gandía
- Tenure: 1412–1422
- Predecessor: Alfonso of Aragon and Foix
- Successor: Hugo de Cardona
- Born: 1358
- Died: 1422 (aged 63–64); Gandía
- Spouse: Maria de Navarra; Violant of Villafeliche
Names
- Alfonso de Aragón and Eiximenis, Alfonso "the young", Alfons "el Jove".
- House: House of Barcelona
- Father: Alfonso of Aragon and Foix
- Mother: Violante d'Arenós
- Religion: Roman Catholicism

Alfonso of Aragon and Eiximenis, also known as Alfonso II of Gandia the young was a promiment Spanish Nobleman also known as Alfonso V of Ribagorza (c. 1358 – 31 August 1422) Duke of Gandia, count of Denia and count of Ribagorza. He was the son of Alfonso of Aragon and Foix and his wife Violante Jimenez.

== Biography ==
He married María of Navarra, daughter of King Charles II of Navarre and Joan of France on January 20, 1393, in Tudela, Navarre. After her death, he contracted a second marriage with Violant of Villafeliche. He had no legitimate children but a son out of wedlock named Jaime of Aragon, to whom his father gave the barony of Arenós and other places.

He was pretender to the throne of the Crown of Aragon during the Caspe Compromise after the death of his father claiming a better right to the throne being a straight male descendant of King Jaime II of Aragon, but he had very little support and finished in the final vote without any vote in his favor. He fought beside Fernando of Antequera, who was elected King of Aragon, during the siege of Balaguer when Jaime II of Urgell, one of the pretenders to the throne, revolted against King Fernando, blocking the city gates of Lleida, and negotiating the surrender of the rebels.

Alfonso the younger prompted the construction of important monuments such as the Monastery of Sant Jeroni de Cotalba and the Ducal Palace of Gandía, which were formerly initiated by his father Alfonso of Aragon and Foix, the elder.

After his death without legitimate descendants, came a lawsuit on the succession of his territories, which was resolved temporarily by giving Gandia to his nephew Hugo Cardona and Ribagorza. A few years later, in 1433, Hugo de Cardona had to cede the Duchy of Gandia to the infante Juan of Aragon, the future John II of Aragon. In this way, the titles of Duke of Gandia and Count of Ribagorza were joined again.

== See also ==
- Dukes of Gandía
- Monastery of Sant Jeroni de Cotalba

== Bibliography ==
- Iglesias Costa, Manuel (2001). Historia del condado de Ribagorza. (in Spanish). Huesca: Instituto de Estudios Altoaragoneses: Diputación de Huesca. ISBN 84-8127-121-7.
