= Confrides =

- Municipality
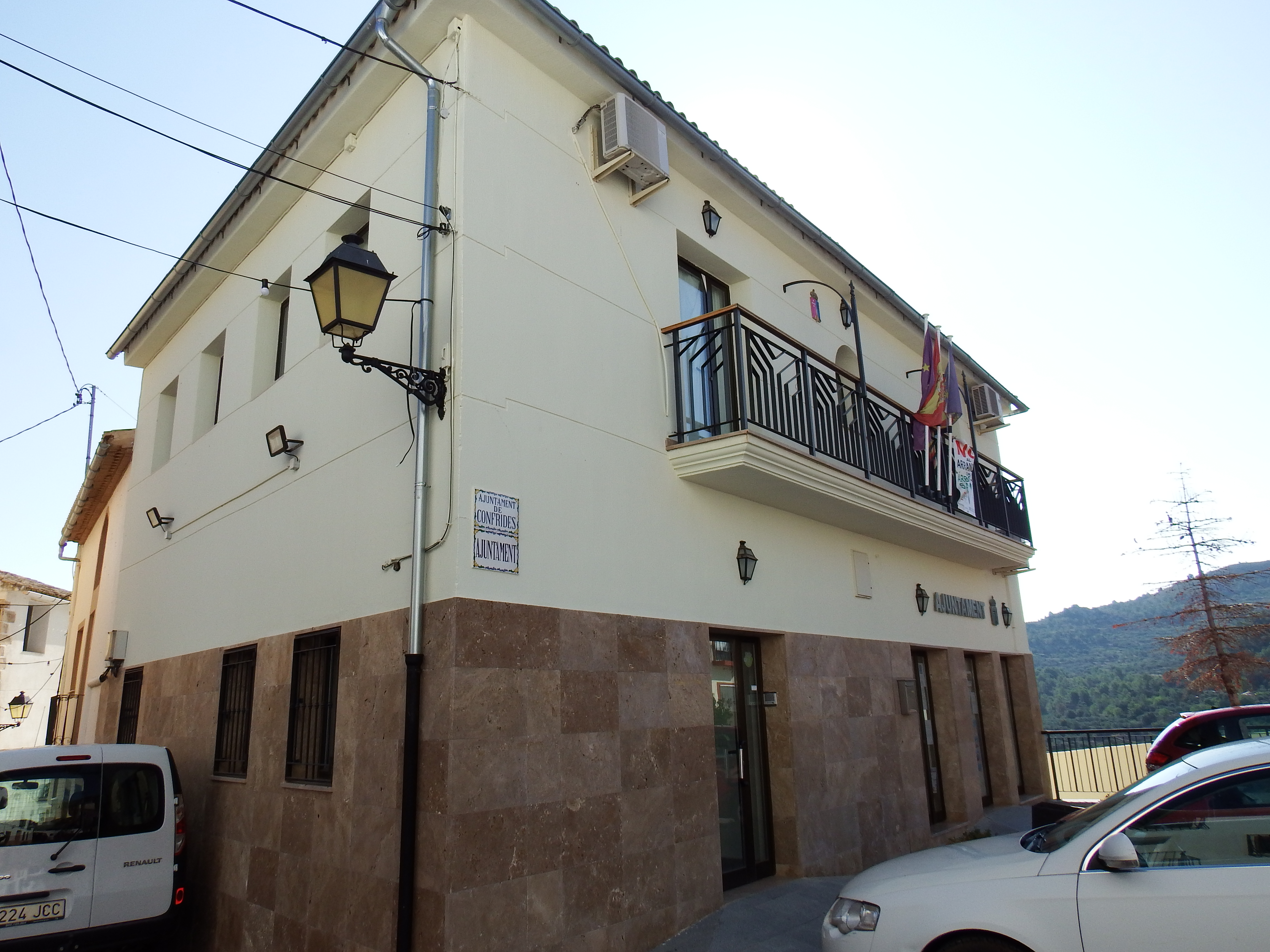
- Town hall

- Coat of arms

- Location in Spain
- Coordinates: 38°41′0″N 0°16′7″W
- Country: Spain
- Autonomous community: Valencian Community
- Province: Alicante
- Comarca: Marina Baixa
- Judicial district: Villajoyosa

Government
  - Alcalde: José Buades Llorca(2007) (PP)

Area
  - Total: 40 km^{2} (15 sq mi)
- Elevation: 785 m (2,575 ft)

Population (2025-01-01)
  - Total: 293
  - Density: 7.3/km^{2} (19/sq mi)
- Demonym(s): Confridenc, confridenca
- Time zone: UTC+1 (CET)
  - Summer (DST): UTC+2 (CEST)
- Postal code: 03517
- Official language(s): Valencian
- Website: Official website

Confrides (Valencian pronunciation: [koɱˈfɾiðes]) is a municipality in the comarca of Marina Baixa in the Valencian Community, Spain.

== See also ==
- Abdet
