= Joan Ramon II of Cardona =

Catalan nobleman

The 3rd Count of Cardona, Joan Ramon II Folc de Cardona (14 June 1400 – 1471), was a Catalan nobleman in the late Middle Ages. His titles included Count of Cardona and Count-consort of Prades, as well as Viscount of Vilamur.

== Biography ==
He was born in (circa) 1400. His parents were Joan Ramon I, 2nd Count of Cardona, and his wife Joana de Gandia. In 1404, he received the Viscountcy of Vilamur from his family.

In the aftermath of the Compromis de Casp of 1412, the young Joan Ramon was still planned to marry Cecilia de Urgell, sister of the vanquished throne candidate Jaume, Count of Urgell. However, by 1418 this wedding project for him had ended in failure.

Instead, the young heir Joan Ramon de Cardona was in 1418 married with Joana de Prades, a younger sister of the Dowager Queen Margerida de Prades who had married very young the aged and ailing King Martin I of Aragon.

Joana inherited the county of Prades, and the Barony of Entença, by royal decision of 1425. This made the young Joan Ramon a sitting peer, Count of Prades, in the parliament, already in lifetime of his father. It even meant that the son's rank was higher than the father's, because Prades was a more senior peerage. The father and son always presented themselves together in the parliament. The younger Joan Ramon was active in parliamentary politics.

When his father, the 2nd Count of Cardona, died in 1441, he inherited the title of Admiral of Aragon and the title of Count of Cardona too. In 1445, as a belated consequence of the death of his father, he decided to renounce Prades and Vilamur in favor of his own son, Joan Ramon III.

However, from about 1445, he also lived in retirement in Cardona, taking an abstentionist role to politics. When the Catalan Civil War broke out in 1462, the county of Cardona remained loyal to King John II of Aragon. Despite the old count's inactivity, this loyalty caused the Catalan authorities to declare the elderly Count Joan Ramon II as enemy of the Principality of Catalonia, in 1462. King John II of Aragon, battling against his own rebelling Catalan subjects, experienced extreme difficulties in 1467, but in 1468, his younger son and later King (from 1479) 16-year-old Ferdinand II of Aragon, received the military help of this 3rd Count of Cardona.

Count Joan Ramon II died in 1471 at Cardona in Bages.

== Family ==
From his marriage with Juana de Prades, five children were born:

- Timbor de Cardona, a nun,
- Violeta de Cardona, married to Felip Albert de Pallars,
- Margarita de Cardona, married to Galcerán VII de Pinos-Fenollet,
- Juana de Cardona, married to Arnau Roger IV de Pallars-Sobirá,
- Juan Ramón Folch III de Cardona (1418-1486), his only son and successor, who would incorporate his mother's titles to those of Count of Cardona.

== Sources ==
- Enciclopedia catalana
