= Giovanni Borgia, 2nd Duke of Gandía =

Son of Pope Alexander VI (c. 1476 – 1497)

Giovanni Borgia
- Duke of Gandía
- Arms of the House of Borgia
- Reign: 1488–1497
- Predecessor: Pier Luigi Borgia
- Successor: Juan de Borja y Enríquez
- Other titles: Captain General of the Church, Gonfalonier of the Church, Prefect of Rome
- Born: c. 1476; Rome, Papal States
- Died: 14 June 1497 (aged 20–21); Rome, Papal States
- Buried: Santa Maria del Popolo, later transferred to the Collegiate Basilica of Gandia
- Noble family: Borgia
- Spouse: María Enríquez de Luna
- Issue: Juan de Borja y Enríquez, 3rd Duke of Gandía; Isabel de Borja y Enríquez
- Father: Pope Alexander VI
- Mother: Vannozza dei Cattanei

Giovanni Borgia, 2nd Duke of Gandía (Spanish: Juan de Borja; Valencian: Joan Borja; c. 1476 – 14 June 1497) was the second child of Pope Alexander VI and Vannozza dei Cattanei and a member of the House of Borgia. He was the brother of Cesare, Gioffre, and Lucrezia Borgia. Giovanni Borgia was the pope's favourite son, and Alexander VI granted him important positions and honours. He was murdered in Rome on 14 June 1497. The case remained unsolved and is still considered one of the most notorious scandals of the Borgia era.

== Early life ==
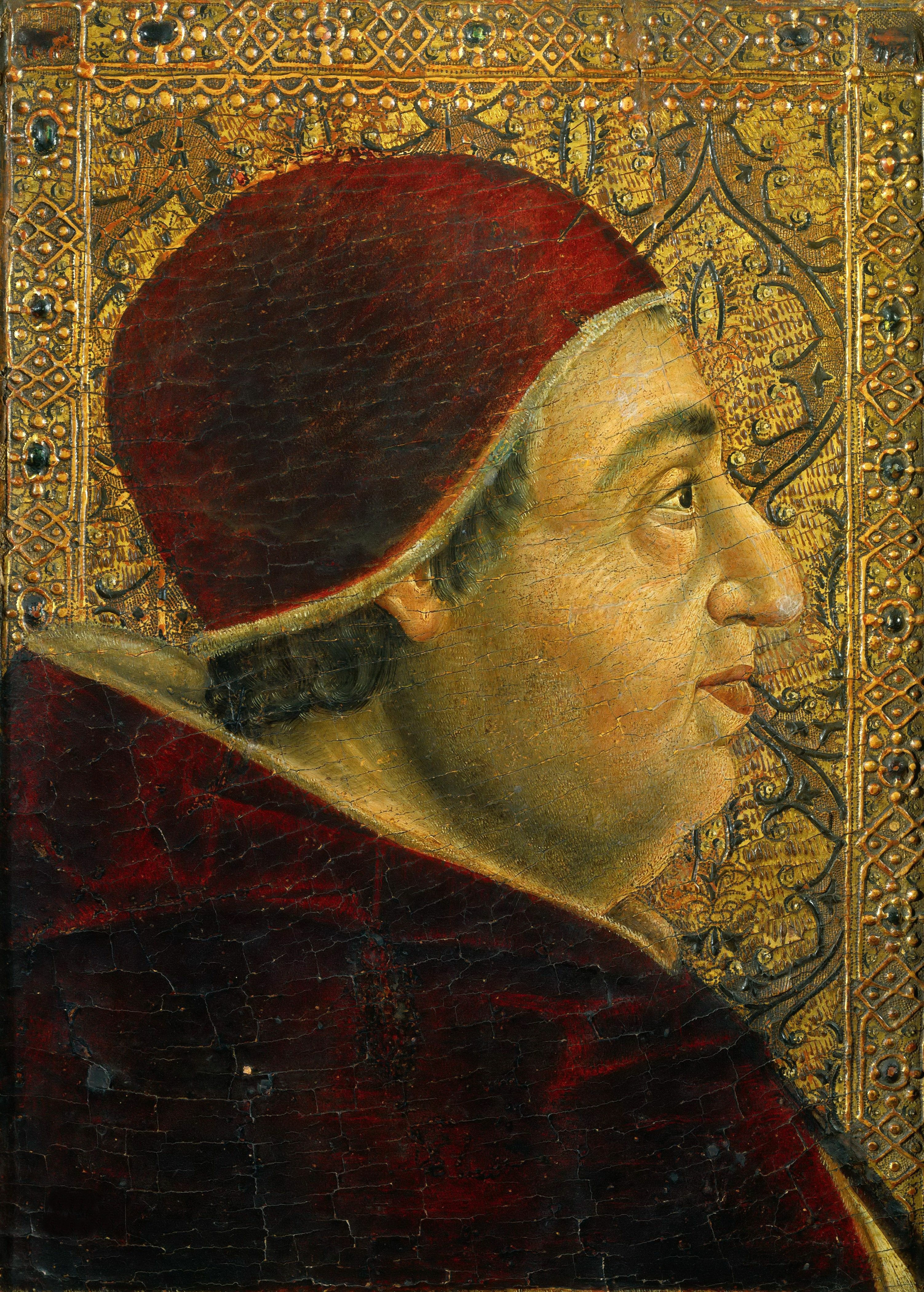
Portrait of Pope Alexander VI

Giovanni Borgia was born in Rome around 1476 to Cardinal Rodrigo Borgia and his mistress, Vannozza dei Cattanei. He was the second son of the couple, after the firstborn Cesare. No exact birth dates are known for him and his brother, and Giovanni was long thought to be the couple's eldest son, but modern research agrees that he must have been younger than Cesare. (Note: Evidence of this is provided by the tombstone of Vanozza dei Cattanei, rediscovered in 1947, in which Giovanni is named as the second-born, and a papal bull from 1493, in which Cesare is described as the elder.) Cesare and Giovanni were brought up together in a house provided by their father, probably supervised by his confidant, Adriana de Mila. An instrument of 29 January 1483 removed the guardianship of Giovanni from his mother's family and gave it to his older half-brother, Pier Luigi and another relative, Otto Borgia.

Pier Luigi died in September 1488 and by his will, Giovanni succeeded him as the 2nd Duke of Gandía. The duchy was located in the Kingdom of Valencia, the Borgia's ancestral homeland, and it was cobbled together by Rodrigo Borgia in 1485 with the help of his patron, King Ferdinand II of Aragon. A marriage contract was written on 13 December 1488 for Giovanni and María Enríquez de Luna, the king's first cousin, who had been betrothed to his brother, Pier Luigi. Because Giovanni was only twelve years old, the wedding was postponed. The situation changed four years later when Cardinal Rodrigo Borgia was elected pope as Alexander VI. A political alliance between the Crown of Aragon and the papacy made the long-planned union more urgent for both sides.

== Years in Spain ==
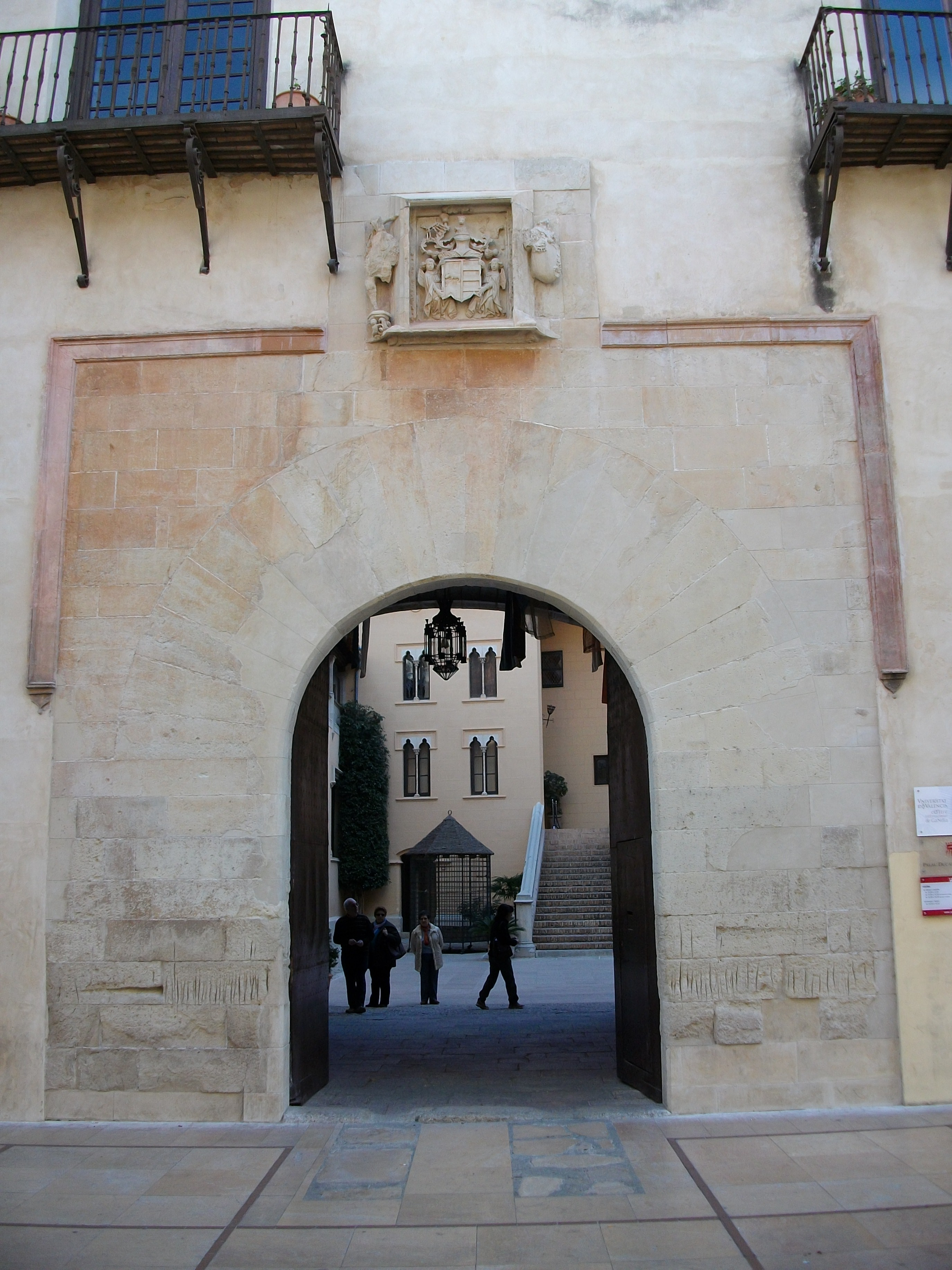
Gothic main entrance of the Ducal Palace in Gandía with the Borgia coat-of-arms

In August 1493, Alexander VI sent the then-17 year-old Giovanni to Spain equipped with a large amount of textiles, jewels, silver and portable goods. "He left Rome loaded with loot and was expected to return next year to make more," wrote the ambassador from Mantua, Giovanni Lucido Cattanei. Giovanni was received with great ceremony by the Catholic Monarchs in the Royal Palace of Barcelona. His wedding to María Enríquez was celebrated at the end of September 1493.

Initially there were rumours, to the great dismay of the pope, that the marriage was not consummated. Alexander VI rebuked his son in a letter dated 30 November 1493, and repeatedly advised him to be a good husband. Eventually, María Enríquez gave birth to two children. Juan de Borja y Enríquez (later the 3rd Duke of Gandía) was born on 10 November 1494. A daughter, Isabel de Borja y Enríquez, was born on 15 January 1497, seven months after Giovanni's departure to Rome; she grew up to be abbess of Santa Clara in Gandía with the name Francisca de Jesús.

Giovanni Borgia spent three years in Spain where he kept a sizeable court of 130 noblemen and their entourage. The pope was constantly worried about his reckless spending, and urged his son to live more moderately and expand his estate. Alexander VI was a keen businessman, and the region around Gandía was a major centre of sugarcane production where buying up lands of the cash-strapped local nobility was a smart plan. In this regard, Giovanni, like his brother before, simply acted as his father's manager in the duchy but his acquisitions were limited.

Arms of the House of Enríquez

Alexander hoped that his son would receive large estates in the recently conquered Kingdom of Granada and become an important figure at the Spanish court. However, the Catholic Monarchs did not heap any more favours on the duke. Queen Isabella was particularly annoyed that the pope was so focused on the promotion of his children, and refused to provide any assistance in this regard. Still, the pope was relentless in this pursuit: he managed to get the new King of Naples, Alfonso II, to grant the fiefdom of Tricarico and the counties of Carinola, Claramonte and Lauria, worth 12,000 ducats a year, to Giovanni on the occasion of his coronation in May 1494. However, the subsequent Italian campaign of Charles VIII of France made these Neapolitan estates unavailable for the Borgias.

The young man was already homesick in 1494, and wrote letters to his father to send ships to take him back to Rome. "Each day seems like a year to me in the delay of those ships which His Holiness has written in recent days he will send soon", he wrote to his brother, Cesare. At this point, Giovanni Borgia was effectively a pawn in the hands of the Catholic Monarchs, as his presence in Spain guaranteed the alliance between the House of Aragon and the papacy against the French.

== Captain General of the Church ==
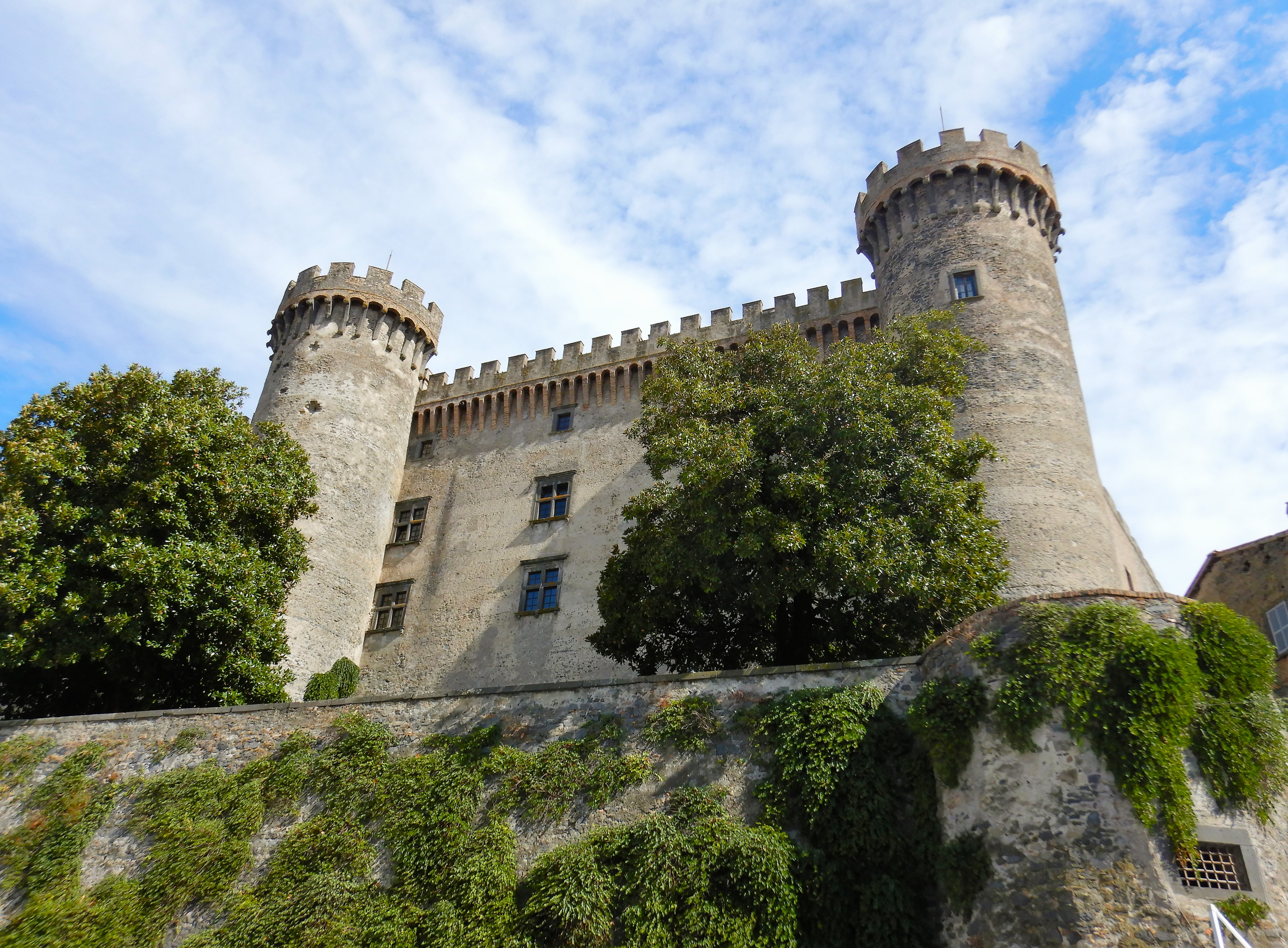
The Orsini Castle in Bracciano that Giovanni Borgia besieged unsuccessfully in 1496

The Duke of Gandía was finally able to return to Italy 1496 after the French army retreated. He arrived in Rome on 10 August without his pregnant wife and his two-year-old son who remained in Spain. He was received in Rome with great pomp and ceremony. All the cardinals, led by his brother, were waiting for him on the Campus Martius, as well as the ambassadors, the Roman nobles and the officials. On 26 October he was invested in St. Peter's Basilica as Captain General and Gonfalonier of the Church.

The pope had great plans for his favourite son, and entrusted him with the campaign against the powerful Orsini family who controlled a large part of the Roman Campagna and had sided with the French against Alexander VI in the previous years. The twenty-year-old duke was completely inexperienced as a commander, therefore he was joined by the condottiero Guidobaldo da Montefeltro. They were initially successful, forcing several Orsini strongholds to surrender while they advanced north from Rome to Lake Bracciano. But the strong castle of Bracciano was able to withstand the siege of the papal forces, and the troops suffered heavily from the harsh winter weather and the rain. Montefeltro was wounded, and the leadership of the campaign devolved mainly to Giovanni. The defendants of the castle insulted him by sending a donkey to his camp with a sign around the animal's neck reading:

Lassatime andar per la mia via, che vado ambasador al ducha di Chandia

Let me pass because I am an ambassador to the Duke of Gandía

— cited by Marino Sanudo

There was even a rude personal message stuck under the animal's tail.

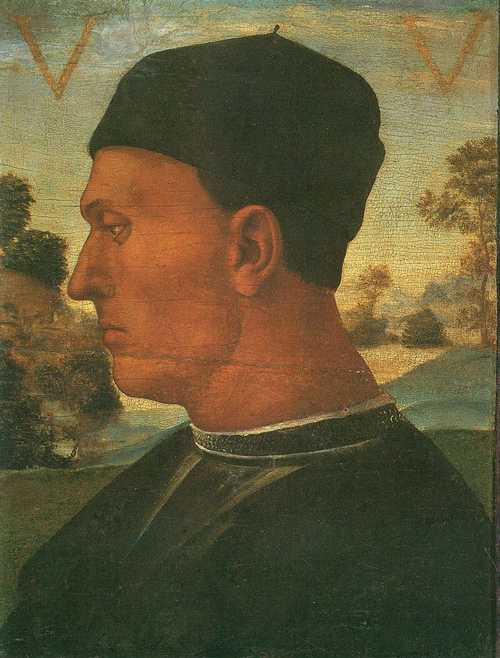
The portrait of Vitellozzo Vitelli, who defeated the papal army in the Battle of Soriano

On 23 January 1497, the Borgia army suffered a heavy defeat at Soriano when the captains tried to fight the Orsini relief army led by Vitellozzo Vitelli and Carlo Orsini in the open field. Montefeltro was captured but Giovanni Borgia managed to escape with only minor injuries to his face.

At the Battle of Soriano "the men of the Church succumbed with great dishonor and loss", as Burchard put it in his diary; some five hundred soldiers were killed and many more were wounded, the Orsini captured all the cannons and scattered the papal forces. They quickly advanced to the walls of Rome and recaptured their lost strongholds. The pope now had no choice but to sign a peace treaty with his enemies in February 1497.

Giovanni's next military endeavour was more successful: he took part in the recapture of Ostia which was still held by forces loyal to the French. The campaign was led by Gonzalo Fernández de Córdoba, an experienced Spanish general, and ended quickly with the surrender of the garrison on 9 March 1497. A few days later Córdoba held a victory parade in Rome, where he was accompanied by the Duke of Gandía and his brother-in-law, Giovanni Sforza. But Córdoba seems to have resented the favouritism shown towards the duke because on 19 March he refused to accept a blessed palm branch during the celebration of Palm Sunday in the chapel of the Apostolic Palace after Giovanni Borgia had received one. It was a surprising rebuke from an important ally of the Borgias.

Despite losing the war against the Orsini, the pope still tried to carve out a principality in Italy for his son. For this, he marked out territories that had belonged to the Patrimony of Saint Peter for centuries. On 7 June a secret consistory was held, in which the Duchy of Benevento and the cities of Terracina and Pontecorvo were granted to the Duke of Gandía and his legitimate descendants. Out of the cardinals present, only Francesco Todeschini Piccolomini raised his voice against the alienation of the lands of the papacy. Jerónimo Zurita claimed that the Spanish ambassador also objected and warned the pope that his plan was unacceptable.

== Murder ==
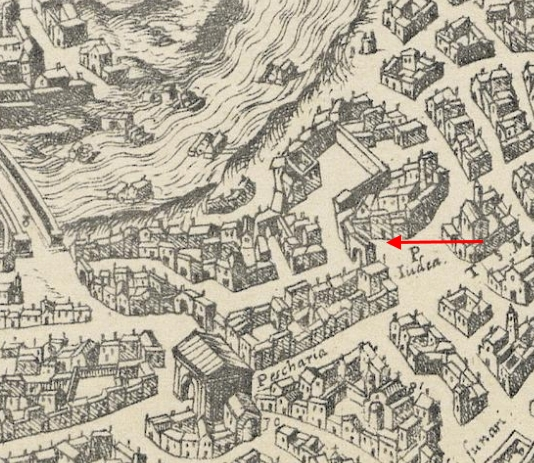
The Square of the Jews on the map of Rome by Étienne Dupérac (1577)

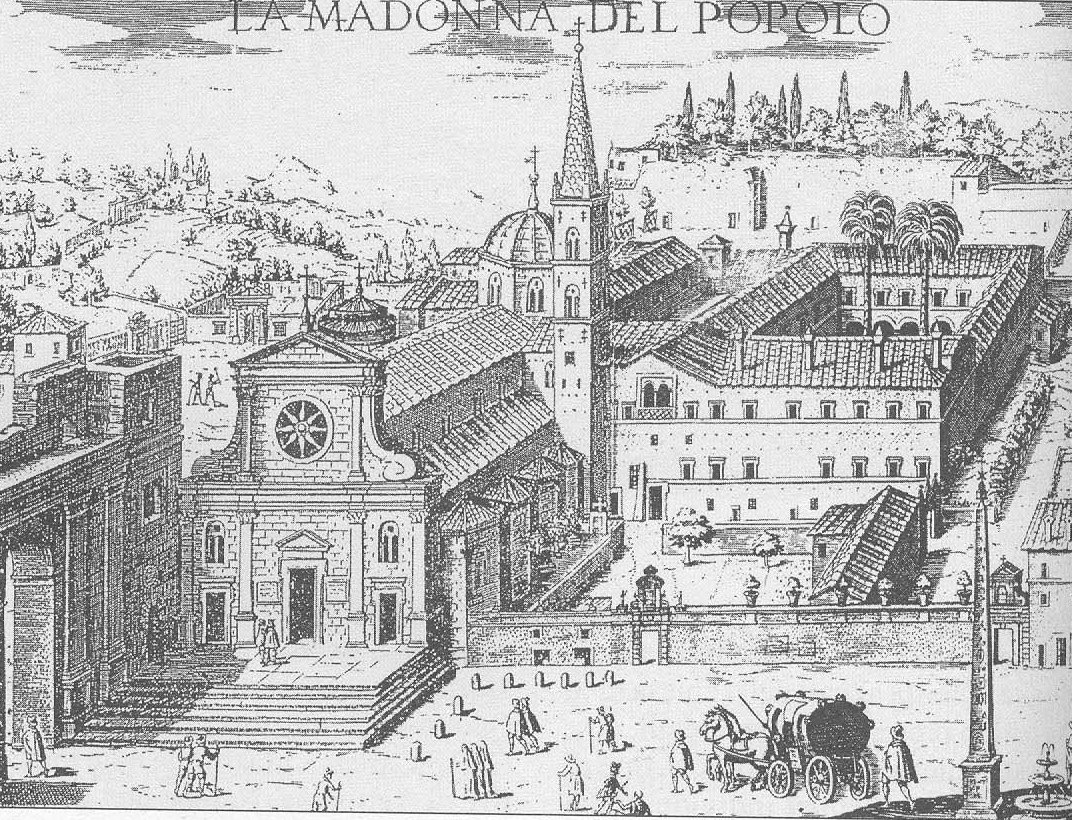
The Santa Maria del Popolo in its original form on Giovanni Maggi's copper engraving (1625)

Giovanni Borgia was murdered on the night of 14 June 1497 in Rome. According to Burchard he was last seen alive when he left a family dinner at the home of his mother, Donna Vannozza, who owned a house near the Church of San Pietro in Vincoli. (Note: The vineyard of Vannozza was located between the churches of Santa Lucia in Selci and San Martino ai Monti identified as plot no. 515 on the Catasto Gregoriano, see William Harrison Woodward: Cesare Borgia, London, 1913, p. 107 and Lorenzo Bianchi: Case e torri medioevali a Roma, Vol. 1., L'Erma di Bretschneider, p. 61) After the dinner, his brother Cesare urged him to return to the Papal Palace, but as they approached the Palace of Cardinal Ascanio Sforza (now the Palazzo Sforza Cesarini), the duke told his brother that he was going to find entertainment somewhere, and dismissed his retinue. He took only his valet and a masked man whose identity was unknown but who had accompanied Giovanni when he arrived at dinner, and had been visiting him almost daily at the palace for about a month. The duke rode to the Square of the Jews where he ordered the servant to wait for him until eight o'clock, and if he had not appeared by then, to return to the palace. Then he rode off with the masked man behind him on the back of his mule.

When the duke did not return to the palace on the next morning, which was Thursday, 15th of June, his trusted servants became uneasy and one of them carried to the Pope the news of the late expedition of the duke and Cesare and the vain watch for the return of the former. The Pope was much disturbed by the news, but tried to persuade himself that the duke was enjoying himself somewhere with a girl and was embarrassed for that reason at leaving her house in broad daylight, and he clung to the hope that he might return at any rate in the evening. When this hope was not fulfilled, the Pope was stricken with deadly terror.

On the morning of 15 June, the servant Giovanni had ordered to wait for him at the Square of the Jews was found fatally wounded and unresponsive, and despite being taken into a house and given care, could neither be saved nor give any account of his master's fate before dying. On the same morning, Giovanni's mule was found or returned to the palace, riderless and with one of its stirrups cut.

Although it was traditionally assumed that Giovanni was killed in or near the Square of the Jews where he had left his valet, in a letter to his brother Cardinal Ascanio Sforza gave a different location for the murder: "The Duke was last seen that night close to the cross in the street leading to Santa Maria del Popolo; it is thought that the crime was committed somewhere near this cross, because both horsemen and others on foot were seen there." Notably, the street he described was the same one that ran along the riverbank where Giovanni's body was later confirmed to have been disposed of.

Alexander VI ordered that all the houses on the banks of the Tiber should be thoroughly searched, including the Palace of Ascanio Sforza. The cardinal fully supported this action but nothing was found. Sforza's private correspondence also indicates that his conscience was clear.

Later a witness, a Slavonian timber dealer named Georgio, made a statement that led to the discovery of Giovanni's body. He had been lying in his boat on the Tiber on the night of the murder to guard his wood, and watched as five men had thrown a corpse into the river next to the fountain at the Hospital of Saint Jerome.

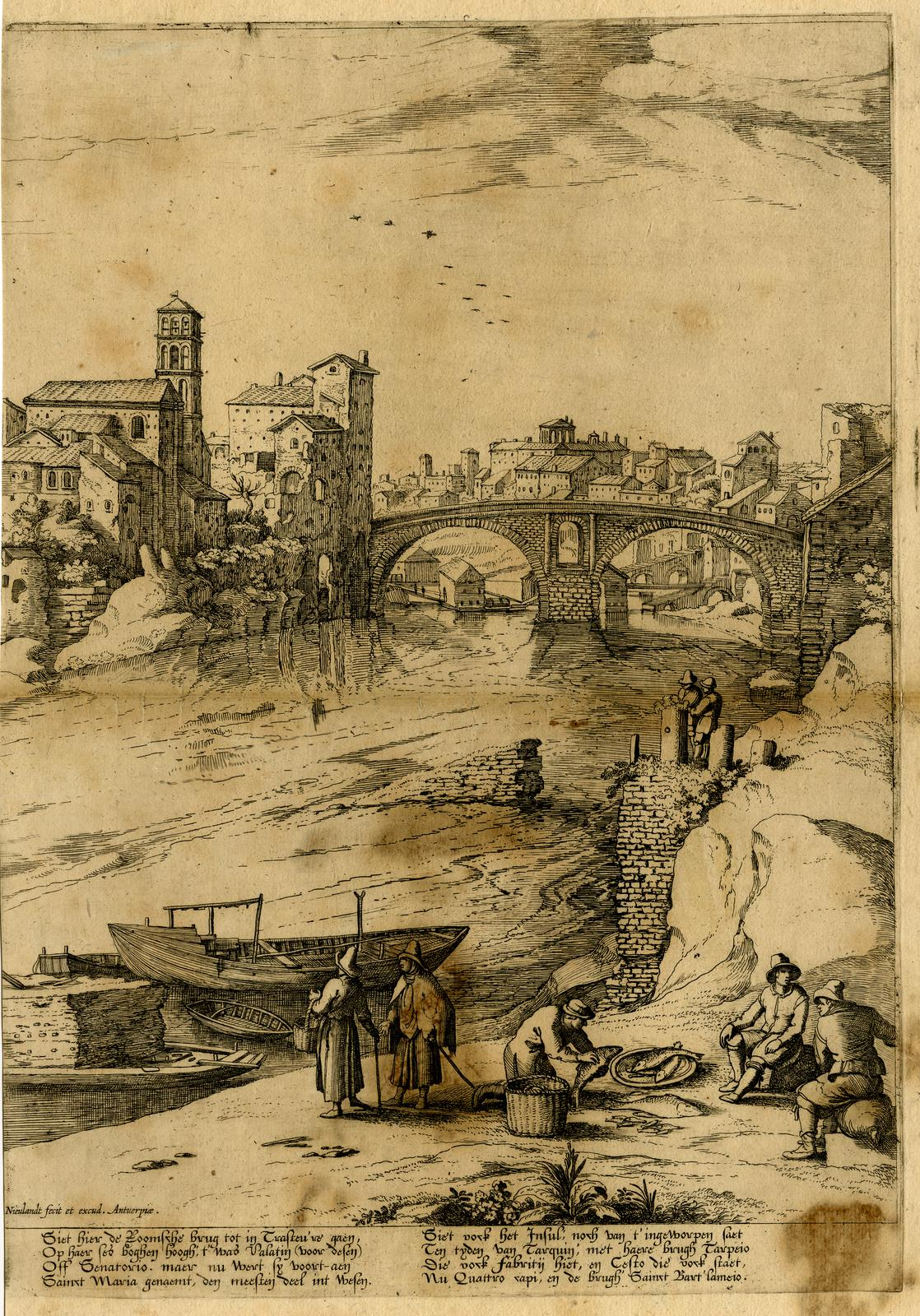
The banks of the Tiber in Rome with barges by Willem van Nieulandt (c. 1602-05)

At about two o'clock in the morning two men came out of a lane by the hospital on to the public road along the river. They looked about cautiously to see whether any one was passing and when they did not see anybody they disappeared again in the lane. After a little while two others came out of the lane, looked about in the same way and made a sign to their companions when they discovered nobody. Thereupon a rider appeared on a white horse who had a corpse behind him with the head and arms hanging down on one side and the legs on the other and supported on both sides by the two men who had first appeared. The procession advanced to the place where the refuse is thrown into the river. At the bank they came to a halt and turned the horse with its tail to the river. Then they lifted the corpse, one holding it by its hands and arms, the other by the legs and feet, dragged it down from the horse and cast it with all their strength into the river. To the question of the rider if it was safely in, they answered, 'Yes, Sir!' Then the rider cast another look at the river and, seeing the cloak of the corpse floating on the water, asked his companions what that black thing was floating there. They answered, 'the cloak,' whereupon he threw stones at the garment to make it sink to the bottom. Then all five, including the other two who had kept watch and now rejoined the rider and his two companions, departed and took their way together through another lane that leads to the Hospital of St. James.

When asked why he had not reported the murder, the witness replied: "In my day I have seen as many as a hundred corpses thrown into the river at that place on different nights without anybody troubling himself about it, and so I attached no further importance to the circumstance".

Fishermen and boatmen were summoned to drag the river; on 16 June, Giovanni's body was recovered from the Tiber.

It was just before vespers when they found the duke still fully clad, with his stockings, shoes, waistcoat and cloak, and in his belt there was his purse with thirty ducats. He had nine wounds, one in the neck through the throat, the other eight in the head, body and legs.

The corpse was thrown into the river at the point besides the fountain where the refuse of the streets is usually dumped into the water, near or beside the Hospital of Saint Hieronymus of the Slavonians on the road which runs from the Angel's Bridge straight to the Church of Santa Maria del Popolo.

Other contemporary sources gave fundamentally different accounts of the murder. These are clearly much less reliable than Burchard's but must have preserved a few crumbs of the rumours circulating at the time. The Venetian Domenico Malipiero claimed that the duke left the banquet with his brother-in-law, Giovanni Sforza, who tortured and murdered him in a vineyard. He did this out of jealousy, because Giovanni Borgia had an incestuous relationship with his sister, Lucrezia, Sforza's wife. However. Malipiero admitted that all this was hearsay.

A contemporary Spanish chronicler, Andrés Bernáldez in his Historia de los reyes católicos, also stated that Giovanni Sforza murdered the duke with his own hands, because they had had a quarrel during the siege of Ostia, and the duke executed four of Sforza's men. To take revenge, Sforza used a masked woman to trap Giovanni Borgia. This woman told the duke, who was drunk and a captive of his vices, that his mistress, Madama Damiata, was waiting for him in the Campo Santo. The body, placed in a sack, was thrown from the Ponte Sisto into the river. After the murder, Sforza hid in the palace of his relative, Cardinal Ascanio, with whom he had planned the crime. Bernáldez's account remained unknown for a long time, as it was not published until 1870, but it shows what information reached Spain about the murder.

== Aftermath of the murder ==
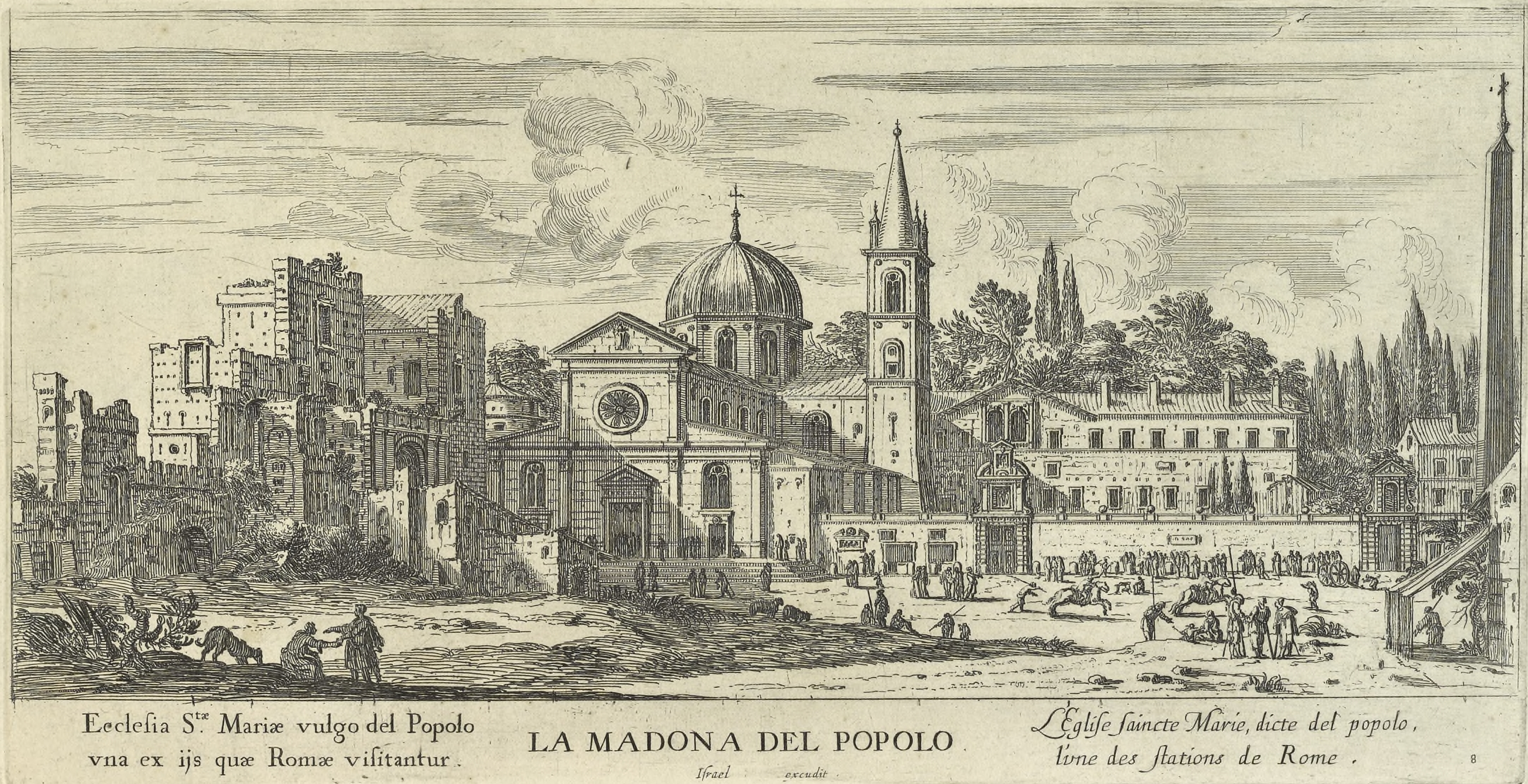
The Church of Santa Maria del Popolo where Giovanni Borgia was buried in 1497 (engraving by Israël Sylvestre).

After the discovery of the body, the grief-stricken pope locked himself in his chambers and wept bitterly for hours. He did not eat and sleep until the next Sunday. He next appeared in public at a consistory on 19 June in front of all the cardinals staying in Rome who offered their condolences to him individually. Alexander lamented the loss of his son with these deeply moving words:

The Duke of Gandía is dead. A greater calamity could not have befallen us, for we bore him unbounded affection. Life has lost its interest for us. Indeed, had we seven papacies, we would give them all to recall the Duke to life. It must be that God thus punishes us for our sins, for the Duke had done nothing to deserve so terrible a fate.

The pope felt such a heavy sense of guilt (or was so appalled by the state of affairs under his rule that this murder made conspicuous) that he decided to reform the Church. "Meanwhile we are resolved without delay to think of the Church first and foremost, and not of ourselves nor of our privileges. We must begin by reforming ourselves," he declared. For this aim he created a commission consisting six cardinals. But his determination was short-lived, and in the end he ignored the report of the Reform Commission.

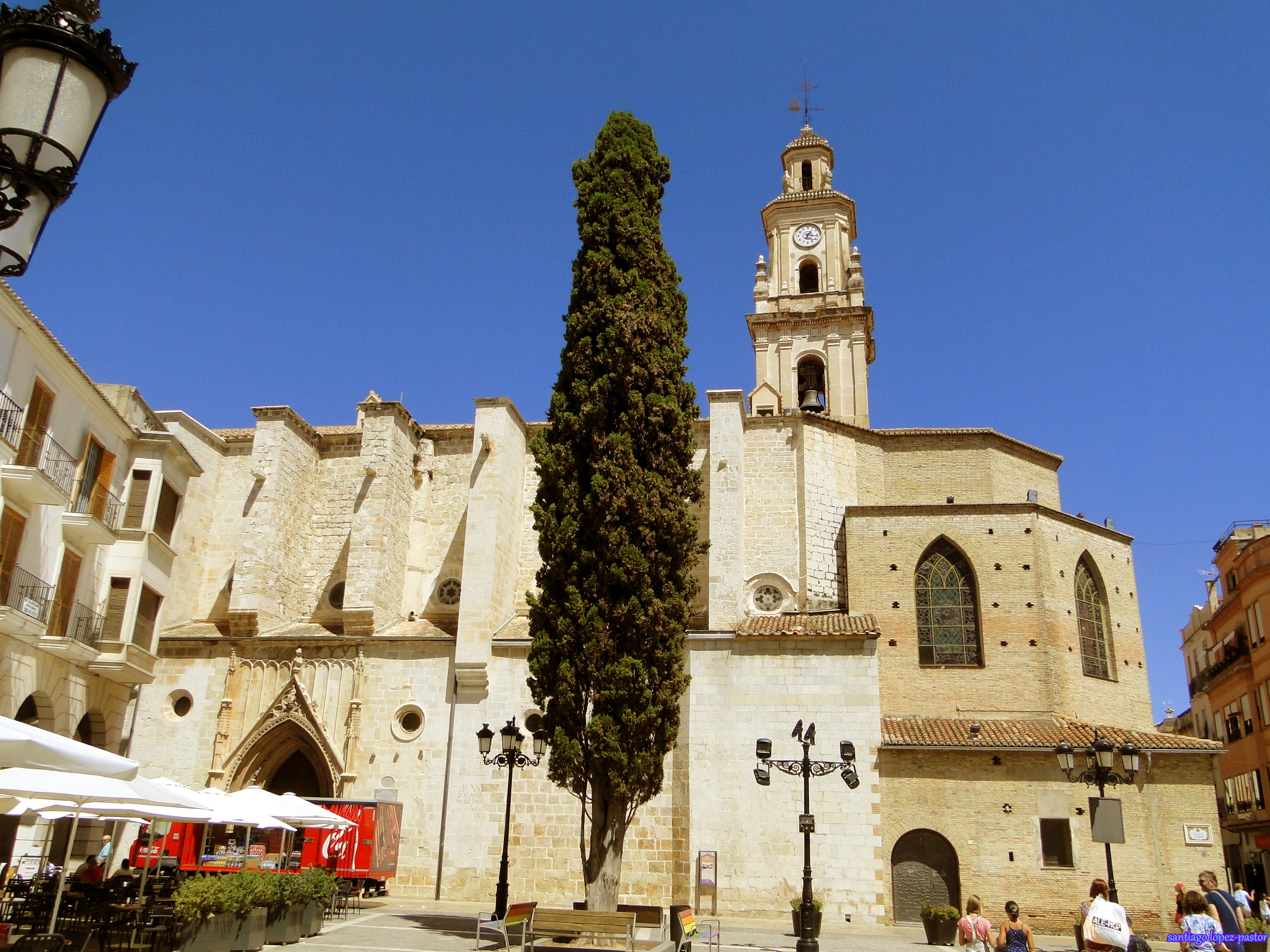
Collegiate Basilica of Gandia.

When the death of the duke was officially announced, many Italian and foreign dignitaries expressed their condolences to the pope including such well-known enemies as Cardinal Giuliano della Rovere and Girolamo Savonarola. In his desperation, Alexander VI wrote to King Ferdinand II of Aragon that he was thinking of abdication, but the king responded that he should not act without deliberation; and he must give himself time to heal from the pain of losing his son.

The corpse of the duke was first brought to Castel Sant'Angelo, then on the same evening, it was transferred to the Basilica of Santa Maria del Popolo, the favourite church of the Borgias, preceded by 120 torchbearers and many prelates and servants. It was laid upon a bier with great pomp and ceremony, and later he was buried in the vault. His brother, Pier Luigi, the first Duke of Gandía had been buried in the same church in 1488.

During the reign of Pope Julius II the widowed Duchess of Gandía, María Enríquez de Luna asked permission to have the remains of both Pier Luigi and Giovanni transferred from Rome to Gandía. The pope ordered the Augustinians of Santa Maria del Popolo, under pain of excommunication, to allow the exhumations. The tombs of the brothers in the Collegiate Basilica of Gandia did not survive.

== Suspects ==
In his speech at the consistory of 19 June, Pope Alexander VI explicitly exonerated some of the suspects.

It is not known at whose hands he met his death. It has been stated that the Lord of Pesaro devised it, which we do not believe, or the Prince of Squillace, his brother, which is utterly false. We are certain, too, that the Duke of Urbino had no hand in it. God forgive the guilty, whoever he was.

At the time, it was presumed that Alexander VI was aware of the identity of the real culprits but saw no opportunity to punish them immediately. "This morning I was told by a trustworthy person that at this time His Beatitude has very close news of the truth, but he will pretend otherwise to surprise the authors in their sleep, as they are very important people and of high status", the Florentine envoy, Alessandro Braccio reported on 23 June.

The investigation lasted more than a year but it was concluded without results. The murder was never avenged, which contributed to the spread of wild rumours. Eventually the unsolved case became part of the black legend of the Borgia, and regarded as one of the most mysterious crimes in history.

The main suspects:

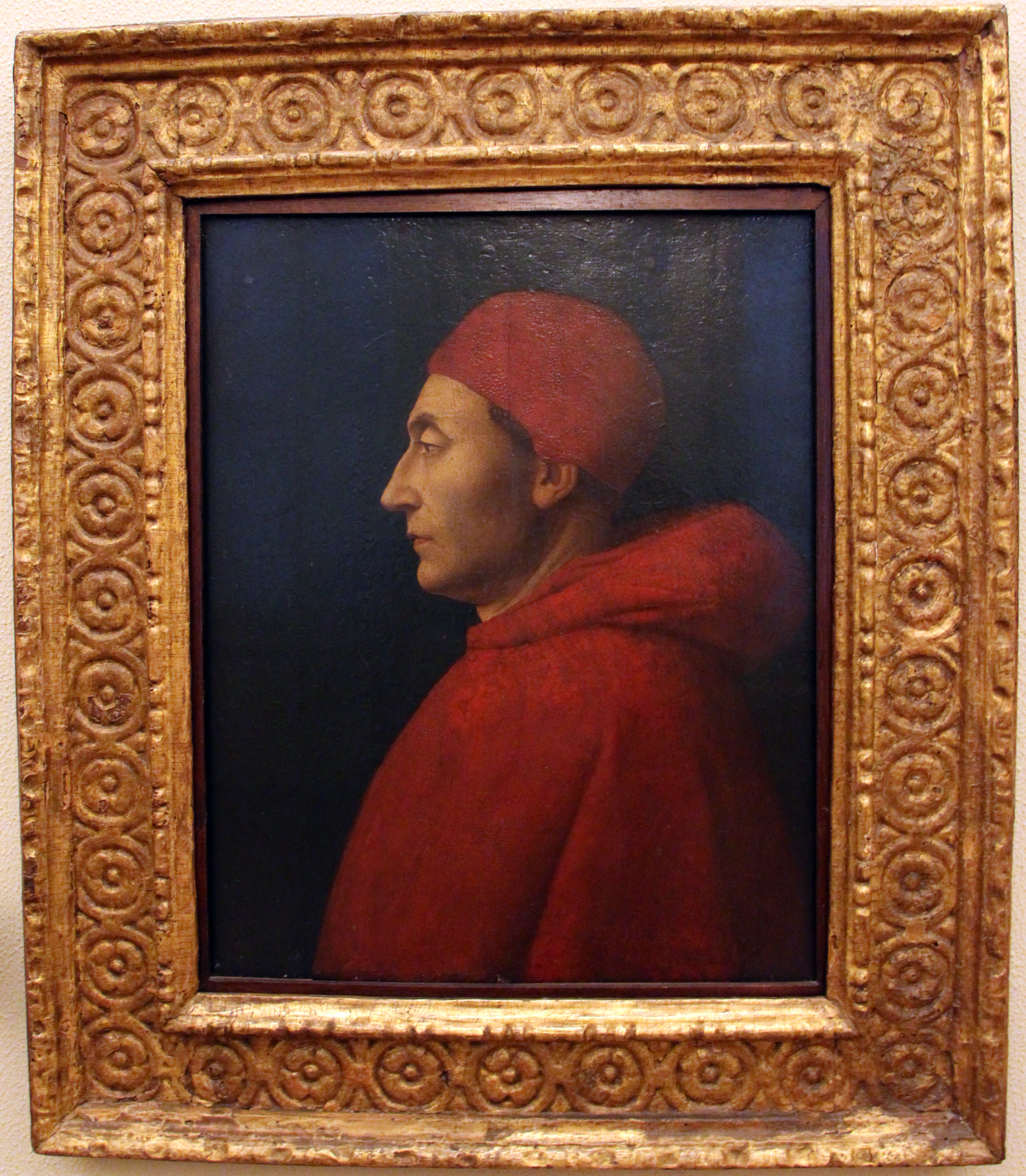
Cardinal Ascanio Sforza was one of the main suspects at the time of the murder but the pope dismissed the charge.

- The most obvious suspects were the Orsinis revenging the death of Virginio Orsini at the beginning of the year in a Neapolitan prison. This ancient Roman family was hostile to the Borgias, and they had fought a war against Alexander VI. They defeated the Duke of Gandía on the battlefield, but the pope's plan to carve out a principality in Italy for his son still posed a threat to the family's fortune. Immediately after the murder, the Milanese envoy wrote that all signs point to the Orsini's guilt, but the pope is acting with great caution. In December Sanudo reported that "the pope was plotting to ruin the Orsini, because they certainly had his son, the Duke of Gandía killed", however, the Venetians intervened that the moment was not suitable. Several sources testify that Alexander VI remained determined to exact revenge on the family but political circumstances prevented him to carry out his plan.
- Ascanio Sforza, Vice-Chancellor of the Holy Roman Church was one of the prime suspects in the period following the murder. At the time the relations between the Sforzas and the pope were tense. The cardinal tried to mediate in the conflict between his cousin, Giovanni Sforza and the Borgias, and immediately before the murder his valet called the Duke of Gandia a bastard during a quarrel and the man was subsequently killed. According to Burchard, the Duke of Gandía took leave of his brother, Cesare near the vice-chancellor's palace on the fateful evening. Ascanio Sforza did not attend the consistory of 19 June. The Spanish ambassador, Garcilaso de la Vega apologised for his absence by saying that he was worried about the rumours accusing him of being behind the murder. Pope Alexander VI immediately absolved him from the charge: "God forbid that I should suspect him, for I hold him as a brother." In a letter to his brother on 20 June, Ascanio Sforza admitted that his people were suspected: "It is said that some of my people may have done it on account of the recent quarrel with the duke". In the following months, relations between the cardinal and the pope fluctuated, meetings were held, but suspicion reared its head again among the Spaniards in Rome, and during the summer Sforza thought advisable to spend more time away from the city. At the time the Venetian envoy wrote that everyone in Rome believes that Ascanio Sforza ordered the murder.
- Antonio Maria Pico della Mirandola was among the early suspects. The Florentine envoy, Alessandro Braccio mentioned that the city police searched all the houses that the duke had been visiting in secret to question family members and maids, including the house of Count Antonio della Mirandola that was located not far from the place where Giovanni Borgia was murdered and where his body was thrown into the river. Mirandola "had a very shapely daughter but of very good fame", Braccio added. It seems that the envoy alluded to a love affair between the Duke of Gandía and the girl, or at least to a rumor circulating in the city. The Ferrarese envoy claimed that the murder was organized by Mirandola and Cardinal Ascanio Sforza, and "the said count was already arrested by the pope". Since Mirandola was never mentioned again, the charge must have been dismissed.
- Suspicions later centred on Giovanni's brother, Cesare Borgia. Some argue that a personal rivalry existed between them and, with Giovanni's death, Cesare was allowed to leave the Church as he wished, taking his brother's place as a man-at-arms and eventually the prospective ruler of a Borgia principality. The claim that Cesare was his brother's murderer is first found in a despatch of the Ferrarese ambassador at Venice: "I recently learned how the death of the Duke of Candia was caused by his brother, the Cardinal", he wrote on 22 February 1498. This new accusation emerged nine months after the murder, and not in Rome but in distant Venice. Until then, Cesare had never been mentioned among the suspects. Two years later, Paolo Cappello, the Venetian ambassador in Rome also included the allegation in his report. (Note: Cappello was not in Rome at the time of the murder, so this only proves that the rumour had spread in the Eternal City by this time.) The malicious rumour was spread further by an infamous pamphlet that appeared in Italy in November 1501. The anonymous Letter to Silvio Savelli was a poisoned attack on the Borgia family which became the basis of the black legend. About Cesare it says: "yet they all fear [the pope], and especially fear his fratricidal son, who, as a cardinal, has become a murderer". Niccolò Machiavelli eventually also came to the conclusion that Cesare Borgia was the perpetrator. (Note: Among the fragments published under the title Estratto di Lettere ai Dieci di Balìa an apparently later note says: "At the time it was not known by whom [the duke was killed]; then it was held for certain that the cardinal of Valenza, or on his orders, had been the author of this murder out of envy, or because of Mona Lucrezia.")

Persons exonerated by the pope:

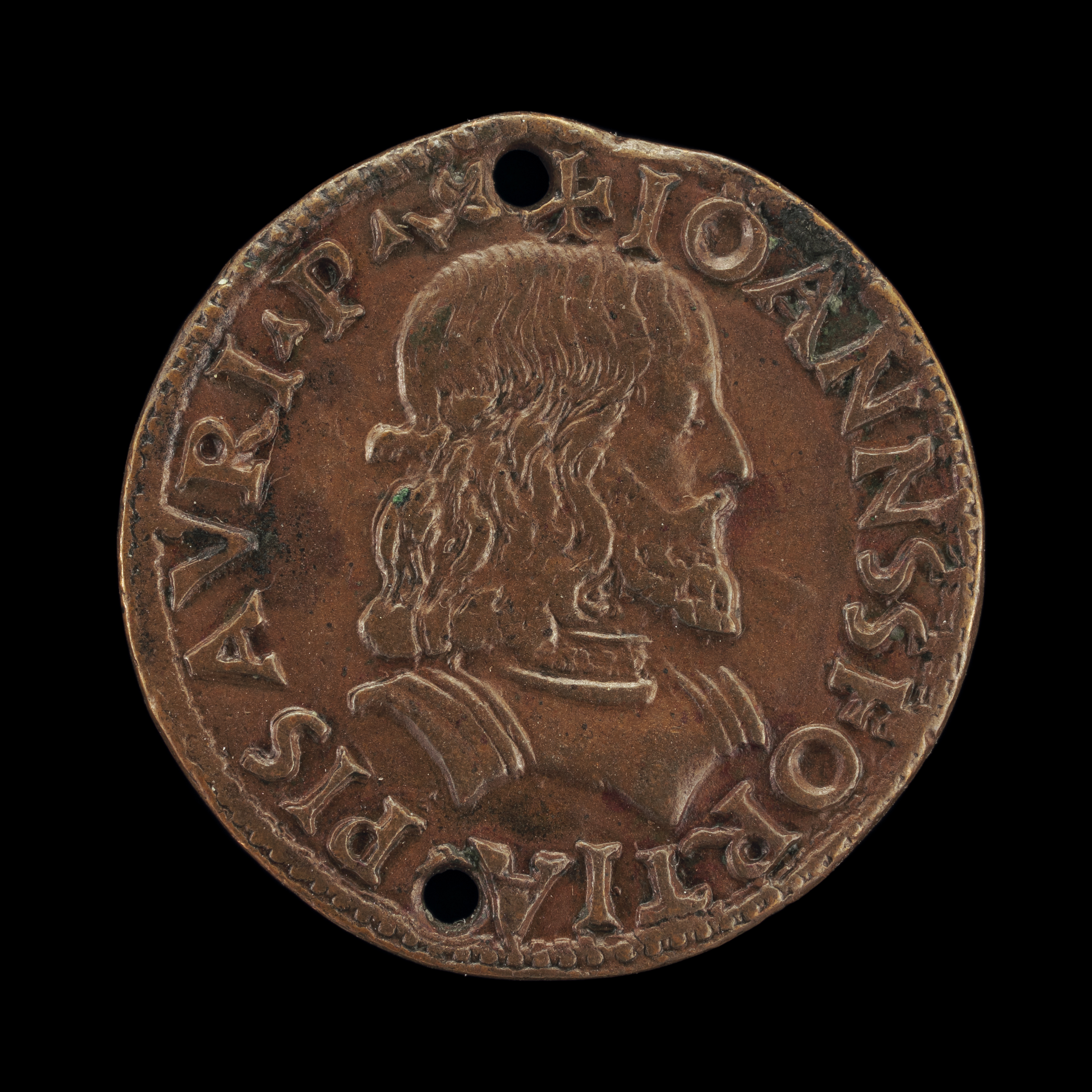
Giovanni Sforza, the Lord of Pesaro

- Giovanni Sforza, the Lord of Pesaro was a condottiero and the husband of Lucrezia Borgia. The marriage was no longer useful for the Borgias politically and Sforza was fearing for his life; he fled Rome in disguise in March 1497. In the following months Pope Alexander VI tried to annul the marriage but Sforza refused the humiliation imposed on him. At first, his brother, Galeazzo was also among the suspects although he had not even left Pesaro.
- Gioffre Borgia, the Prince of Squillace was the younger brother of Cesare and Giovanni Borgia. His wife, Sancia allegedly had affairs with both of her husband's older brothers. It was rumoured that Gioffre had killed his brother out of jealousy, but the pope apparently considered this utter nonsense. (Note: The pope was obviously addressing a rumour; Sanudo also reported that "for many months past the lady Sancia has given herself to the Cardinal of Valencia", see I diarii di Marino Sanuto, Venice, F. Visentini, 1879, Vol. 1, p. 792)
- Guidobaldo da Montefeltro, the Duke of Urbino was a condottiero who led the papal troops against the Orsini together with Giovanni Borgia in 1496. Montefeltro was captured at the Battle of Soriano, but the pope refused to pay his ransom, and he had to arrange his release at his own expense. This gave him enough reason to resent Giovanni Borgia's undeserved success, yet the pope was sure that he had not instigated the murder.

Proceedings against Cesare

Some sources suggest that María Enríquez, the Dowager Duchess of Gandia, held Cesare Borgia responsible for her husband's murder. But these sources describe events which happened after the death of Pope Alexander VI, when Cesare had already lost his principality, and was arrested in Naples by Gonzalo Fernández de Córdoba in May 1504. One contemporary diplomatic despatch on 18 June 1504 claimed that "the wife of the Duke of Candia, who was killed by Valentino, procured this act of retribution and revenge, and she is a relative of the King of Spain." According to Höfler, this was just a rumour that arose because an explanation was needed for the uncharacteristic act of Córdoba who violated safe-conduct with the arrest. However, Antonio Giustiniani, the Venetian envoy in Rome wrote the same in his report in May. On 19 October, when Cesare Borgia was already transferred to a Spanish prison, Giustiniani claimed that letters have come from Spain about "a trial being held against him for the death of the Duke of Gandía, his brother and for the death of his brother-in-law; with the intention of having him executed for his crimes".

This proceedings ultimately came to nothing due to Cesare's escape and later his death in 1507. María Enríquez was an influential lady in the Spanish court, and if she really blamed her brother-in-law for the murder, her opinion certainly mattered a lot for the Catholic Monarchs. But she had never set foot in Italy and the circumstances of the murder were only known to her by hearsay.

Opinions

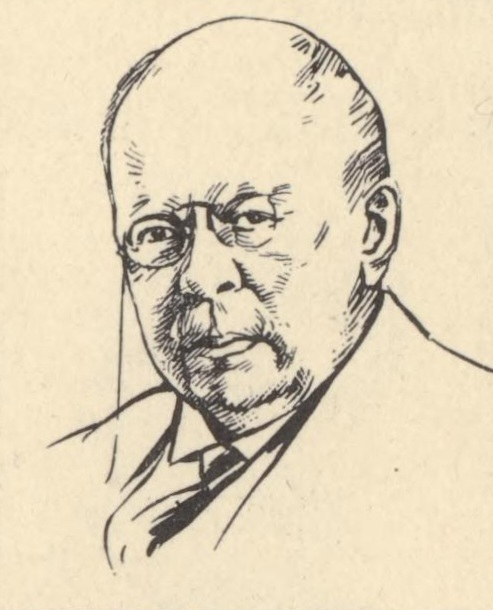
Ludwig von Pastor came to the conclusion that Cesare Borgia had no part in the murder

Historians and chroniclers have always been divided about the identity of the perpetrator. The theory about Giovianni Sforza being the murderer of his brother-in-law was popularized in the colourful but highly unreliable account of Francesco Matarazzo in his Chronicles. As we saw from Bernáldez's account, the same view prevailed in Spain at the time of the murder.

Francesco Guicciardini summarized the most popular argument for Cesare's guilt in his highly influential work, The History of Italy in 1537-40. According to him the Cardinal of Valencia "aspired to the exercise of arms, and could not tolerate that this place was occupied by his brother. He was, besides, extremely jealous that Madonna Lucrezia, their sister, loved him more." So the main motives were incestuous lust and ambition. His contemporary, Paolo Giovio also blamed Cesare in his Vita e gesta di Ferdinando Consalvo.

In the 19th century, modern academic historians have generally dismissed this theory. Ludwig von Pastor ruled out Cesare's guilt based on a thorough examination of the sources and found that no such assumption was made at the time of the murder. "Whether the Duke of Gandia fell a victim to the revenge of the Orsini and Giovanni Sforza, or to his own profligacy, or to both, it is certain that Caesar was not implicated in this crime", he concluded.

The same verdict was previously reached by Konstantin von Höfler, who stated that Cesare had no real reason for the murder, and that the pope's behavior makes this conjecture completely unrealistic. In the end, the belief "is only rooted in the fact that, under completely different circumstances, Cesare got rid of the petty tyrants" of Romagna, he observed. In 1877, Alois Knöpfler devoted an entire study to proving Cesare's innocence. Among the English, William Roscoe was of the same opinion, having established that the only really useful source for the murder was Burchard, and "throughout the whole narrative, there is not the slightest indication that Caesar had any share in the transaction"; on the fateful night the Duke of Gandía might have been "detected by some jealous rival, or injured husband, and had paid with his life the forfeiture of his folly", he assumed.

Ferdinand Gregorovius was one of the few who still supported Guicciardini's claim: "According to the general opinion of the day, which in all probability was correct, Caesar was the murderer of his brother", he wrote. He even accused Pope Alexander VI becoming "morally accessory after the fact", as he fell under the power of his terrible son. Rafael Sabatini in his biography of Cesare Borgia criticized Gregorovius for this unprofessional opinion: "There is much against Cesare Borgia, but it never has been proved, and never will be proved, that he was a fratricide. Indeed the few really known facts of the murder all point to a very different conclusion — a conclusion more or less obvious, which has been discarded, presumably for no better reason than because it was obvious", he argued. Sabatini believed that the duke, whose wrists were pinioned, was most probably tortured and then killed by a personal enemy which "points to an affair of sordid gallantry". (Note: Only Domenico Malipiero mentioned that the duke's hands were tied in his rather unreliable account of the murder.)

== Giovanni Borgia's character ==
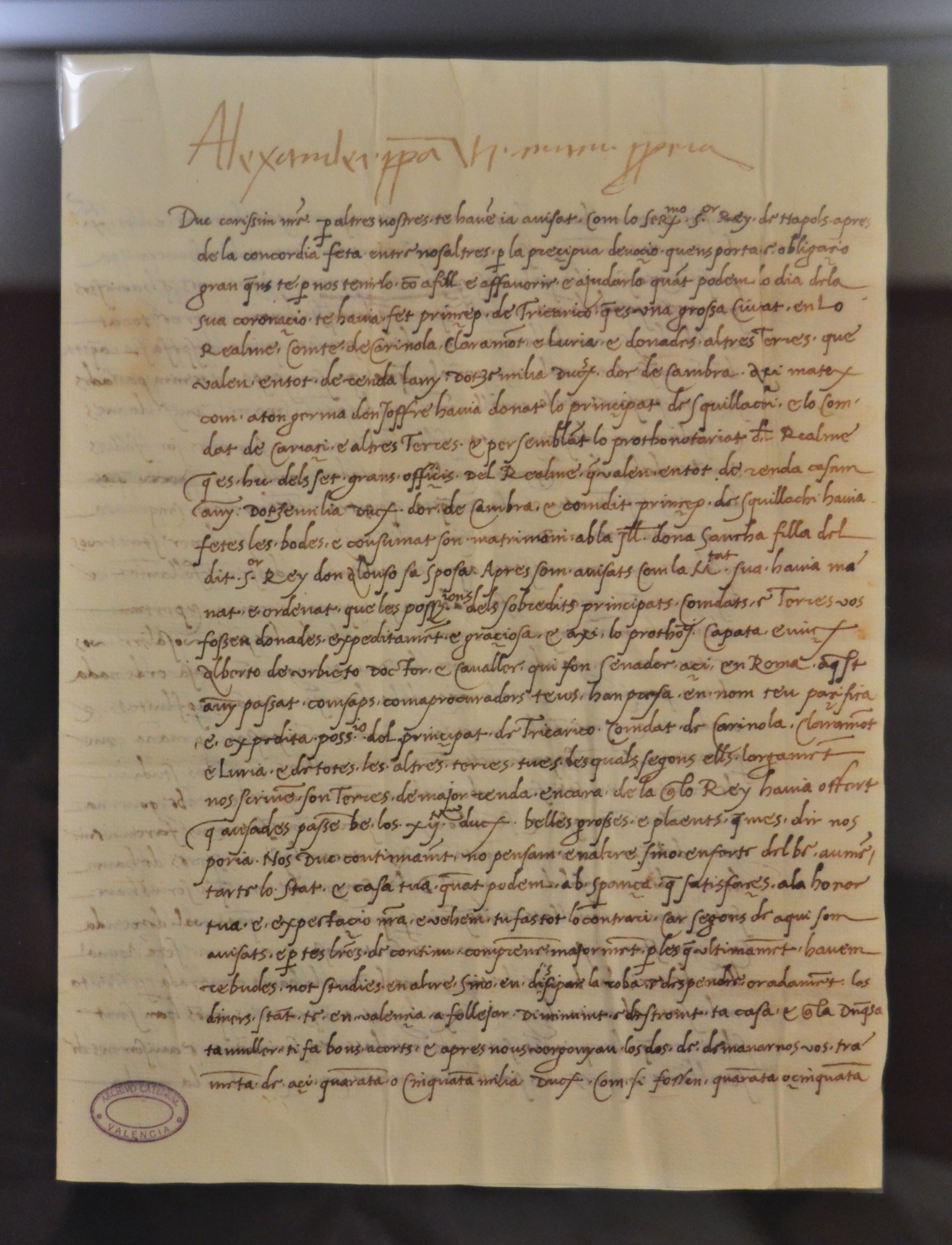
Letter from Alexander VI to his son rebuking him for the many expenses, giving him instructions and informing him of the problems with France (29 May 1494, Rome)

As the pope's favourite son, Giovanni held great influence over his father. Carlo Canale, Vannozza's third husband, wrote on 18 March 1493: "In dealings with His Holiness you could have no better intercessor than His Lordship, because he is the apple of His Holiness's eye."

Gianandrea Boccaccio, the ambassador from Ferrara, spoke more highly of Cesare Borgia than of his brother in his description of the pope's teenage sons. In 1493, he wrote: "His demeanor is much more impressive and preferable than that of his brother, the Duke of Gandia. He too is not lacking in good qualities."

The Duke of Gandía was a handsome young man who dressed fashionably and ostentatiously. At his sister's wedding to Giovanni Sforza in June 1493 he wore a long Turkish-style cloth-of-gold robe, called turcha, its sleeves embroidered with large pearls, and expensive jewels including a chain of balas rubies and pearls. The dazzling attire was estimated to be worth 150,000 ducats.

Although Giovanni was born in Italy from an Italian mother, the Borgias used the Valencian variety of the Catalan language among themselves as letters between him and his family members show. These letters give an insight into his personal relationships and character during the time when he lived in Spain. At first the young duke apparently became unhinged in the foreign environment, and his behavior caused scandal. Directed by the pope, Cesare wrote a strongly worded letter to his younger brother:

No matter how much joy and happiness I felt for my promotion to the cardinalate, although it was great, my anger was still greater when I heard of the bad reports that His Holiness Our Lord had received of you and your bad behaviour; because they have informed His Beatitude that you had been going around Barcelona at night killing dogs and cats, often visiting the brothel, gambling much money, speaking improperly and imprudently to important people, not obeying Don Enrique and Doña María [his father and mother-in-law] and finally acting in a way truly unworthy of a gentleman of your position.

After taking possession of the Duchy of Gandía on 4 December 1493, Giovanni tried to placate his furious father, and diligently completed the tasks assigned to him, including the procurement of floor tiles for the Borgia Apartments of the Apostolic Palace and the restoration of Castel Sant'Angelo. Rejecting the rumours that he was indifferent to his wife and devoted solely to idle pleasures, he wrote to his father: "What saddens me especially is that Your Holiness has given credence to assertions that have no semblance of truth."

He was on friendly terms with his brother-in-law, Giovanni Sforza, and wrote an endearing letter to his sister, Lucrezia asking for more frequent communication citing his pregnant wife who "complains a great deal of you, that you have never written despite all the letters sent to you from here".

Before his trip to Spain, he was also friends with Prince Djem, an Ottoman hostage living in Rome. It was a sign of this friendship that they rode together during an excursion of the papal court through the city to Saint John Lateran on 5 May 1493 when Giovanni Borgia was conspicuously dressed in Turkish robes. Djem died in 1495 before the duke returned to Rome.

In later literature, he was often characterized as vain and arrogant, although a 17th-century anti-Borgia biographer, Tomaso Tomasi described him as a man "naturally gifted with a very pleasant appearance and gentle manners, except for some laxity in the matters of Venus".

== In literature ==
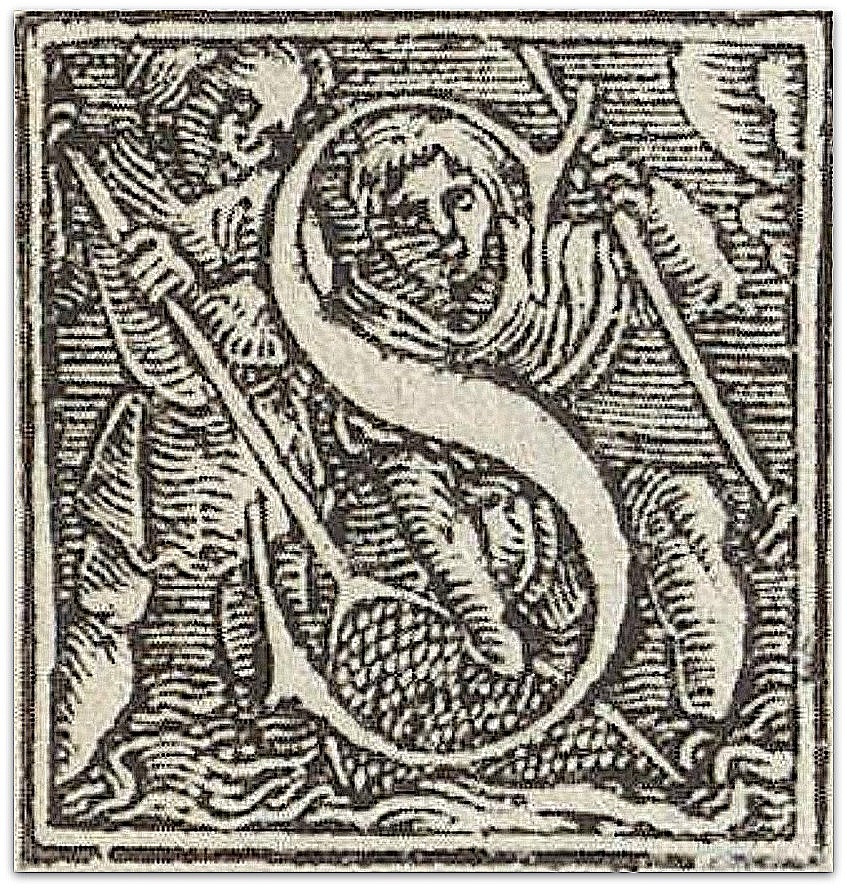
Woodcut initial from Jacopo Sannazaro's collected works, probably referring to the famous Fisher of men epigram (printed in Lyon, 1536)

The murder occasioned the witty and cruel epigram by the contemporary Neapolitan poet and humanist, Jacopo Sannazaro about Pope Alexander VI. The poem plays on the apostolic title of the pope as fisher of men alluding to the scandal when his son's body was dragged from the river:

Piscatorem hominum ne te non Sexte putemus / Piscaris natum retibus ecce tuum

Lest we do not think you are not a fisher of men, Sixth, you fish for your own son with nets

— Jacopo Sannazaro, Epigrammata

The most important Renaissance literary work remembering the event was a traditional Hispanic ballad (romance) entitled Muerte del duque de Gandía (Death of the Duke of Gandía). The original version was in all probability composed right after the murder, and belonged to the group of news-bearing ballads dealing with tragic contemporary events. The ballad survived in five different 16th-century printed editions. Even the oldest version, from a chapbook printed in Burgos around 1530, appeared more than thirty years after Juan's death, which suggests that the ballad had previously been transmitted by oral tradition for a long time. The remaining versions were included in chapbooks printed around 1540 in Valladolid and in Valencia around 1560, and two famous songbooks that appeared in Valencia and Granada (in 1573 and 1588 respectively). The ballad was apparently popular on the Iberian Peninsula, and retained its relevance for more than a century. Other ballads of this kind usually disappeared quickly from the press.

The romance portrayed Alexander VI as a loving father worrying about his son, and later as an example of Christian charity who forgives the murderers and even absolves them. Juan is described as a young nobleman widely mourned by the papal court, who "did not deserve such harm", although some versions refer to his sins. The murderers remain unnamed although one songbook version claims that they have already fled beyond Lombardy. The main motif of the ballad is the finding of the body, which the text attributes to the same boatman who witnessed the murder. The rich clothing and the horrific wounds of the victim are emphasized. Although some researchers interpreted the ballad as anti-Borgia propaganda, a reading of the text does not really support such a view, in fact there is an obvious sympathy for the grieving pope and his murdered son.

The oral tradition of the ballad died out on the Iberian Peninsula but lived on in the Sephardic diaspora. A very large number of versions in Judaeo-Spanish were recorded among the Jewish communities in the Eastern Mediterranean and in Morocco. In these late versions all the historical references to the Borgias and Rome were lost, and Giovanni Borgia was transformed into a "golden duke" whose corpse was discovered in the sea. In some versions he was murdered by a fisherman. In this way the murder of the Duke of Gandía became a Jewish folk tale.

In fiction

The crimes and tragedy of the Borgias became a frequent literary topic during the Romantic era. The black legend was created by Renaissance pamphlet writers and chroniclers, but 19th-century poets and novelists made it widely known to the European reading public. From the beginning, the murder of the Duke of Gandía by his jealous brother was a crucial element.

The fratricide was mentioned in Massimo d'Azeglio's 1833 historical novel, Ettore Fieramosca, a highly popular literary expression of Italian patriotism in the Risorgimento era. D'Azeglio made Cesare Borgia an antihero who, among his many other crimes, threw the corpse of his brother into the Tiber, "washed off the blood-stains from the pommel of his saddle, and disappeared in a dark lane".

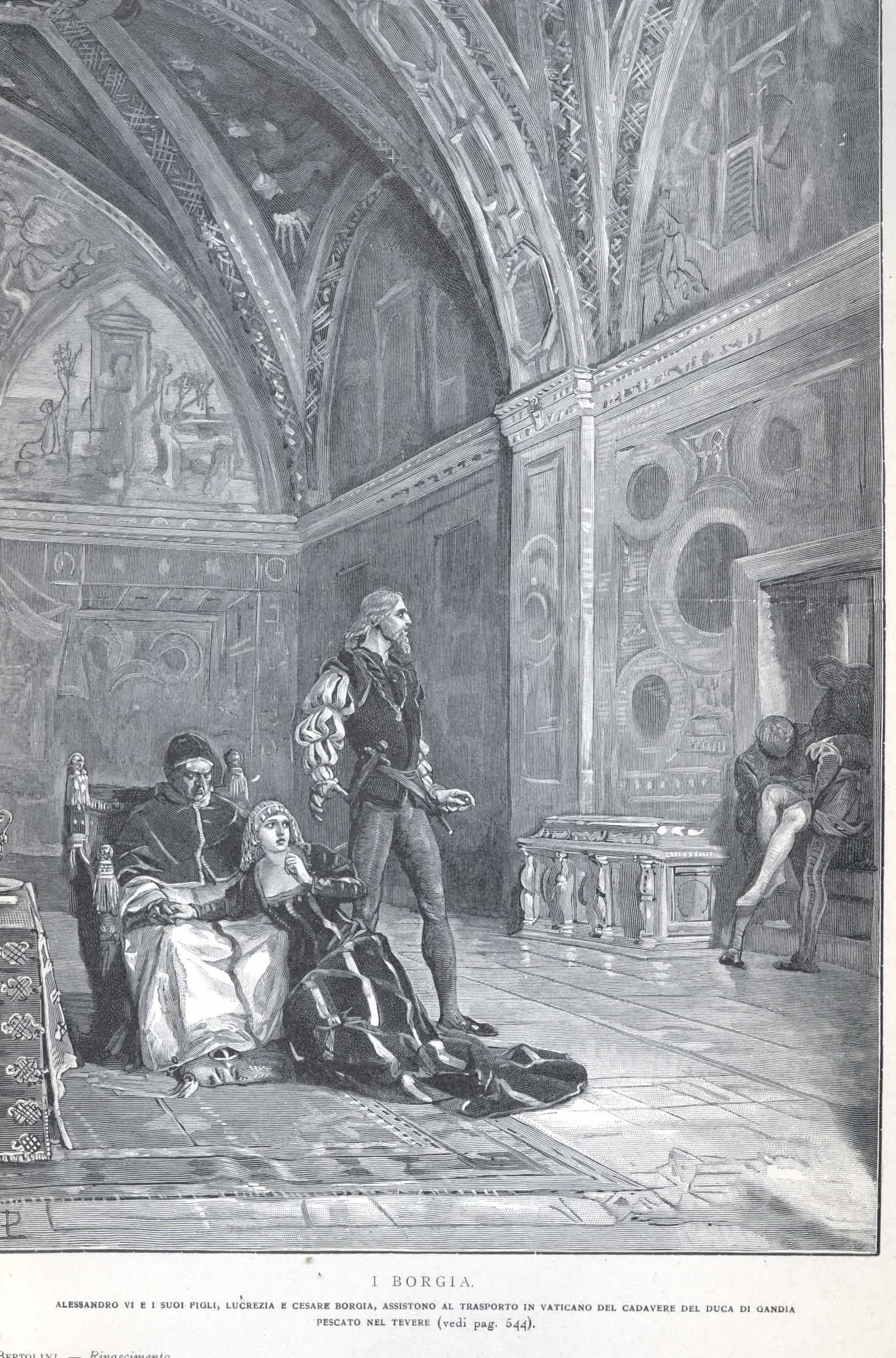
Giovanni Borgia's corpse brought to the Vatican (Lodovico Pogliaghi's woodcut from 1897)

Nikolaus Lenau, one of the most important German poets of the Late Romantic era dedicated a song, "Vater und Sohn" to Giovanni Borgia's murder in his 1837 epic, Savonarola. The song describes an imagined late-night conversation between Alexander VI and his son, Cesare, during which he tells the pope that he killed his brother. The young duke is not sleeping in the arms of a prostitute, as his doting father thinks:

Diesmahl hat eine alte, kühle, / Unsaubre Dirne ihn umfasst; / Er hält auf ihrem schlechten Pfühle vom Liebestaumel tiefe Rast.

This time an old, cold, unclean whore has embraced him; and he is taking a deep rest on her bad pillows from the madness of love.

— Nikolaus Lenau, Savonarola

The old whore Cesare is speaking about is the Tiber, and in this moment Alexander VI, the great sinner "is shocked to see that he has fathered an even greater one".

The murder was recounted by Alexandre Dumas in his 1840 novel, The Borgias (although Giovanni Borgia is referred to as Francesco) which was published in his Celebrated Crimes series. One of Dumas' early historical novels, it was based on documentary research, probably conducted with the collaboration of Pier Angelo Fiorentino, an Italian author whom he had met in Naples. The French writer closely follows Burchard's description of the murder, only adding a few storytelling details and an invented dialogue between Cesare Borgia and his henchman, Michelotto Corella. The novel relies on the well-established clichés of fratricide and incest. Dumas' opposition to authoritarian and absolute regimes provide a framework for interpretation but the novel also had a strong anticlerical message. The whole series was popular literature, and it was reprinted many times in the 1840s.

The modernist Algernon Charles Swinburne wrote a drama about the murder titled The Duke of Gandia in 1908, also naming the victim Francesco, and using Michelotto as Cesare's henchman. This decadent work focused on the thoroughly immoral character of the Borgias using florid Shakespearean language and again an imagined conversation between the pope and Cesare after the murder. It was not meant to be a play for the stage, but a brief, dramatic poem of "hate, ambition, fear, desire, and the conquest of ironic evil".

The murder of Giovanni Borgia is one of the main topics in Canto V by Ezra Pound written in 1919. Recounted along with another infamous Renaissance era crime, the murder of Duke Alessandro de' Medici by his cousin, the poem is concerned with the relationship between historical facts and historiography. As Pound's main source was William Roscoe, who acquitted Cesare Borgia of the murder charge in his Life and Pontificate of Leo the Tenth , Pound does not take it for granted that Giovanni Borgia was killed by his own brother. History is to some extent unknowable and, as he says, "slander is up betimes". Pound's poetic vision of the murder is particularly evocative:

Tiber, dark with the cloak, wet cat, gleaming in patches. / Click of the hooves, through garbage, / Clutching the greasy stone. "And the cloak floated"

— Ezra Pound, Canto V

In contrast to the sensationalism of the Romantic literary tradition, the 1926 novel of The Borgias or At the Feet of Venus by Vicente Blasco Ibáñez was based on modern scientific research. The Spanish realist writer wanted to rehabilitate the memory of the much-maligned family. After painstakingly reconstructing the events, the narrator concludes that the accusations against Cesare are only malicious slander, and his brother was simply a young man, enjoying life, not realizing the dangers involved. "He was, in reality, a superficial man, his character not corresponding to his external brilliance. But ... many ladies raved about his elegance and masculine vigor", Ibáñez says about Juan.

== In art ==
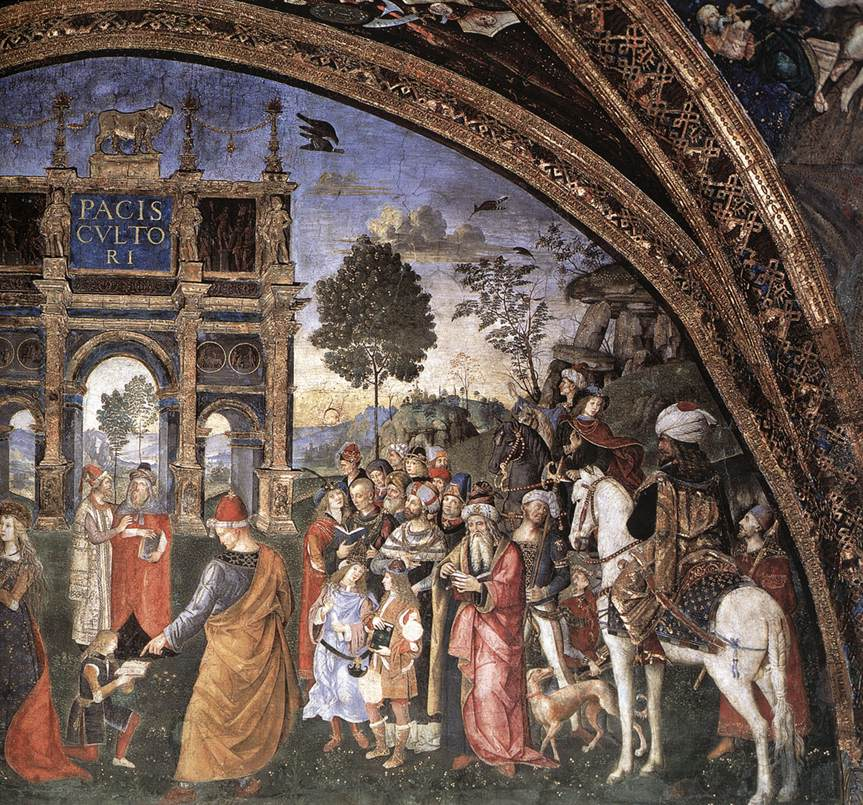
Pinturicchio's Disputation of St. Catherine (detail)

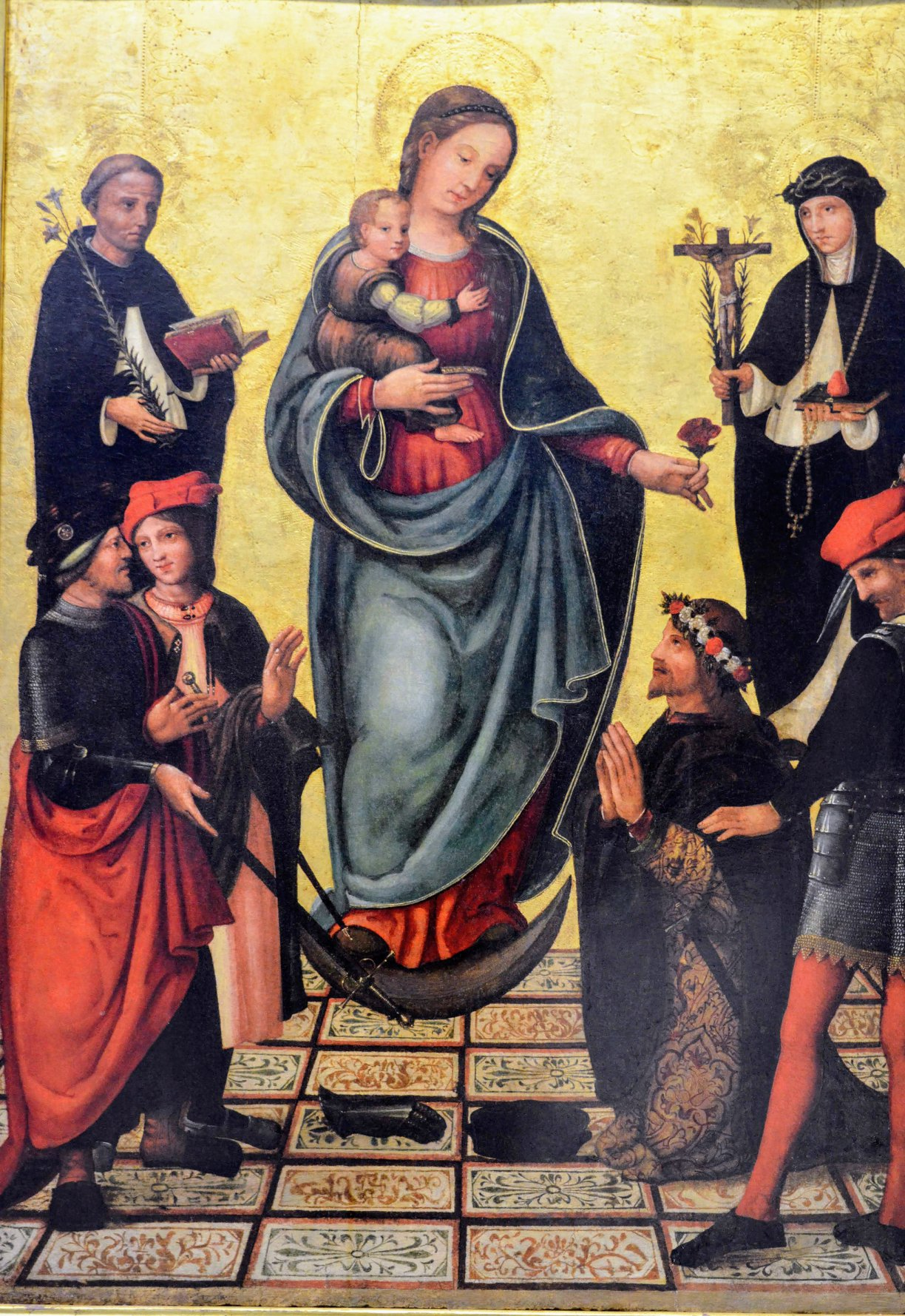
Miracle of the Knight of Cologne by Miguel Esteve (once thought to have been Giovanni Borgia)

During his short life, Giovanni Borgia did not become a patron of artists, and there is no authentic contemporary portrait of him.

He is sometimes identified with the horseman in a Turkish robe on the far right of the famous fresco of the Disputation of St. Catherine by Pinturicchio in the Borgia Apartments. The young Duke of Gandía liked to wear fashionable oriental clothes. He memorably rode through Rome dressed alla turchesca and with a turban on his head during a papal procession in May 1493, perhaps out of courtesy to his friend, Prince Djem. But other than that, there is not much to support the theory.

In 1897, Franz Ehrle, the first monographer of the Borgia Apartments refuted the claim that any of the pope's children were portrayed on the fresco. Cesare, Lucrezia and Giovanni were still teenagers, when Alexander VI created the apartments for his own personal use in the Vatican Palace between 1492 and 1494. They were younger than any of the figures painted. "Conjectures on this subject have long been taken up by the ciceroni, passing them off as proven facts. ... It would be appropriate to stop spreading these fables", he stated. A few years later Pinturicchio's biographer, Evelyn March Phillipps identified "the fierce and stately prince on horseback" as Prince Djem. Despite this, the claim still appears regularly in literature dealing with the Borgias. (Note: The theory was popularized by Christopher Hibbert and Peter G. Maxwell-Stuart, among others. Although there is no documentary evidence either that the horseman is Djem, the 33-years-old Ottoman prince is a much more likely candidate for the man depicted on the fresco.)

Another painting erroneously connected to Giovanni Borgia is a small panel in the collection of the Museu del Patriarca in Valencia. Painted by an unknown artist it shows the Virgin Mary with two saints. In the foreground, a bearded young man is about to be stabbed by an assassin while two other men watch the scene. Émile Bertaux, who discovered the painting in 1908, claimed that it was commissioned by María Enríquez de Luna, Giovanni Borgia's widow, and it shows the murder of her husband ordered by his brother, Cesare. Bertaux stated that panel "is the most striking memory of the tragic family in the Kingdom of Valencia". The fanciful interpretation is not supported by any documents, and was based simply on a perceived physical likeness of one of the figures to Cesare Borgia. The painting was later attributed to Miguel Esteve, and the subject was identified as the Miracle of the Knight of Cologne, a popular story related to the Virgin of the Rosary's cult. In fact, there is no evidence that the painting has anything to do with the Borgia family.

== Popular culture ==
In the 2010 animated short film, Assassin's Creed: Ascendance, a fictionalised version of Juan's death is depicted at the hand of Cesare Borgia, who hires a prostitute to murder him.

In the 2011 Showtime series, The Borgias, Juan is played by David Oakes. He is portrayed as an arrogant and hedonistic man, wearing a facade of bravado to mask his naivety and inner weakness. Haunted by deep-seated insecurities about his parentage and sense of belonging within the family, he goes to extreme lengths, often driven by misguided notions, to safeguard the Borgia legacy. However, his efforts frequently lead to tragic consequences and ultimately to his own downfall. He is killed by Cesare after attempting to reconcile, offering a speech of forgiveness. Cesare rejects the gesture, murders him, and dumps his body in the Tiber in the second season of the series, in "World of Wonders".

In the 2011 French/German series, Borgia, Juan is played by French actor Stanley Weber. He is a main character in the first season and dies in that season's finale "The Serpent Rises". In this adaptation, he is the eldest child of Rodrigo and Vannozza, and his murder is perpetrated primarily by Lucrezia, with the help of her lover, Pedro Caldes.

The portrayals of Juan in the two shows are markedly different. In the 2011 French/German series, he is depicted as haughty, selfish, and cruel, with few redeeming qualities. In contrast, the 2011 Showtime series presents him as a broken soul who made mistakes but later strove for self-betterment, only to be ultimately crushed by his brother's envy and betrayal, as well as his own descent into delirium and madness brought on by illness (syphilis and gangrene).

The CBBC television show Horrible Histories features a song portraying the Borgia family, with Ben Willbond as Giovanni Borgia.

== See also ==
- List of unsolved murders (before the 20th century)
- Route of the Borgias

== Notes ==
Preceded by Pier Luigi de Borgia	Duke of Gandía; 1488 - 1497	Succeeded by Juan de Borja y Enríquez de Luna
