= Alfonso I, Duke of Gandia =

Alfonso de Aragon and Foix

Duke of Gandía
- Tenure: 1399–1412
- Predecessor: Peter, Count of Ribagorza
- Successor: Alfonso of Aragon and Eiximenis

Count of Ribagorza
- Tenure: 1365–1412
- Predecessor: Peter, Count of Ribagorza
- Successor: Alfonso of Aragon and Eiximenis
- Born: 1332
- Died: 5 March 1412 (aged 79–80); Gandía
- Burial: Collegiate Basilica of Gandia
- Spouse: Violante Díaz de Arenós
- Issue Detail: Alfonso of Aragon the Younger; Pedro of Aragon; Violante of Aragon; Juana of Aragon
Names
- Alfonso de Aragón y Foix, Alfonso "the Old", Alfons "el Vell".
- House: House of Barcelona
- Father: Peter, Count of Ribagorza
- Mother: Isabel de Foix

Alfonso de Aragón y Foix (1332 - Gandia, 5 March 1412) also called Alfonso I of Gandía "the old" and Alfonso IV of Ribagorza, was the eldest son of Count Peter of Ribagorza and Juana of Foix. He was the grandson of James II of Aragon and cousin of Pedro IV "the Ceremonious". He held the titles of Duke of Gandía (from 1399), Count of Denia (since 1355), Count of Ribagorza (from 1361), Marquis of Villena (since 1366), and first Constable of Castile.

He was a claimant to the Crown of Aragon in the succession crisis that followed the death of Martin of Aragon with no children. Alfonso claimed the crown as senior male-line descendant of James II. Alfonso died before the crisis was resolved by the Compromise of Caspe; his claim was inherited by his brother, Juan of Aragon and Foix.

== Marriage and children ==
From his marriage in 1355 with Violante Díaz de Arenós, daughter of Gonzalo Díaz de Arenós and his wife María Juana Cornell, he had the following children:

- Alfonso of Aragon the Younger (c. 1358 – 1422), who inherited the Duchy of Gandia and the counties of Ribagorza and Denia.
- Pedro of Aragon (1362 - Battle of Aljubarrota 1385), married to Joanna of Castile, natural daughter of King Henry II of Castile and father of Enrique de Villena (1384 - 1434).
- Violante de Aragón (1405/1445), abbess of the Convent of Santa María de Valencia or de la Puridad.
- Juana de Aragón y Arenós (1378 - 1442), married in 1377 to Joan Ramón Folc I de Cardona, 2nd Count of Cardona, with issue.
- Eleanor or Violante de Aragón, married in c. 1393 with Jaime de Prades, Baron of Caccamo and Esclafani, Constable of Sicily from 1375 to 1408, with issue.

== See also ==
- Dukes of Gandía
- Monastery of Sant Jeroni de Cotalba

== Bibliography ==
- Iglesias Costa, Manuel (2001) Historia del condado de Ribagorza. (in Spanish). Huesca: Instituto de Estudios Altoaragoneses: Diputación de Huesca. ISBN 84-8127-121-7.
- Suárez Fernández, Luis (1976) Historia de España Antigua y media (in Spanish). vol.1, p. 318. Ediciones Rialp ISBN 8432118826.
