= Duke of Gandía =

Title of Spanish nobility

Dukedom of Gandía
- Creation date: 20 December 1485
- Created by: Catholic Monarchs
- Peerage: Peerage of Spain
- First holder: Pedro Luis de Borja, 1st Duke of Gandía
- Present holder: Ángela María de Ulloa y Solís-Beaumont, 20th Duchess of Gandía

Duke of Gandía (Valencian: Ducat de Gandia, IPA: [duˈkad de ɣanˈdi.a]) is a title of Spanish nobility that was first created in 1399 by Martin of Aragon and granted to Alfonso of Aragon and Foix. It has its origin in the lordship of Gandía created in 1323 by James II of Aragon. Later, having no direct descendants, the title passed from the House of Barcelona to the House of Trastámara.

The title was re-established in 1483 by Ferdinand II of Aragon as a favour to Rodrigo Cardinal Borgia for his son Pier Luigi Borgia. The dukedom then went to Pier Luigi's half-brother Giovanni Borgia. He was assassinated, and his young son inherited the title. The fourth duke was the religious figure Francesco Borgia. After the death of his wife, with whom he had a large family, he became a Jesuit.

== Dukes of Gandía ==
=== House of Aragon ===
Arms of the dukes of Gandía of the House of Aragon

- Pedro de Aragón y Anjou, Lord of Gandía (1323–1359)
1. Alfonso of Aragon and Foix, Lord of Gandía (1359–1399), Duke of Gandia (1399–1412)
2. Alfonso of Aragon and Eiximenis (1412–1422)
3. Hugo of Cardona and Gandia (1425–1433)

=== House of Trastámara ===
Arms of the House of Trastámara

- John II of Aragon (1433–1439)
- Charles, Prince of Viana (1439–1461)
- Ferdinand II of Aragon (1461–1483)

=== House of Borja or Borgia ===
Arms of the dukes of Gandía of the House of Borja or Borgia

On 20 December 1483, the title was re-established by Ferdinand II of Aragon and granted to the House of Borgia, of Spain and Italy.

1. Pier Luigi de Borgia (Pedro Luis de Borja), 1st duke
2. Giovanni Borgia (Juan de Borja), 2nd duke
3. Juan de Borja y Enríquez de Luna, son of Giovanni Borgia, (1495–1543), 3rd duke
4. Saint Francis Borgia (Francisco de Borja), 4th duke
5. Carlos de Borja y Aragón, 5th duke
6. Francisco Tomás de Borja Aragón y Centelles, 6th duke
7. Francisco Carlos de Borja Aragón y Centelles, 7th duke
8. Francisco Diego Pascual de Borja Aragón y Centelles, 8th duke
9. Francisco Carlos de Borja Aragón y Centelles, 9th duke
10. Pascual Francisco de Borja Aragón y Centelles, 10th duke
11. Luis Ignacio Francisco Juan de Borja Aragón y Centelles, 11th duke
12. María Ana Antonia Luisa de Borja Aragón y Centelles, 12th duchess (d. 1748)

=== House of Pimentel ===
Arms of the House of Pimentel

- Francisco de Borja Alfonso Pimentel y Borja
- María Josefa Pimentel y Téllez-Girón

=== House of Osuna ===
Arms of the House of Osuna

- Pedro de Alcántara Téllez-Girón y Beaufort
- Mariano Téllez-Girón y Beaufort Spontin
- Pedro de Alcantara Téllez-Girón y Fernández de Santillán
- María de los Dolores Téllez-Girón y Dominé
- Ángela María Téllez-Girón y Duque de Estrada
- Ángela María de Ulloa y Solís-Beaumont

== See also ==
- House of Borgia
- Monastery of Sant Jeroni de Cotalba
- Route of the Borgias
- Ducal Palace of Gandia
- History of Spain
