= PR 100 =

PR 100 is the name of different places:

== In Puerto Rico ==
- Puerto Rico Highway 100, a secondary highway in southwestern Puerto Rico

== In Spain ==
- PR-CV-100, a short-distance footpath of the Valencian Community

== In the United States ==
- Texas Park Road 100, a highway that runs along South Padre Island
