= PR-CV 100 =

PR-CV 100 Rotova's Paths
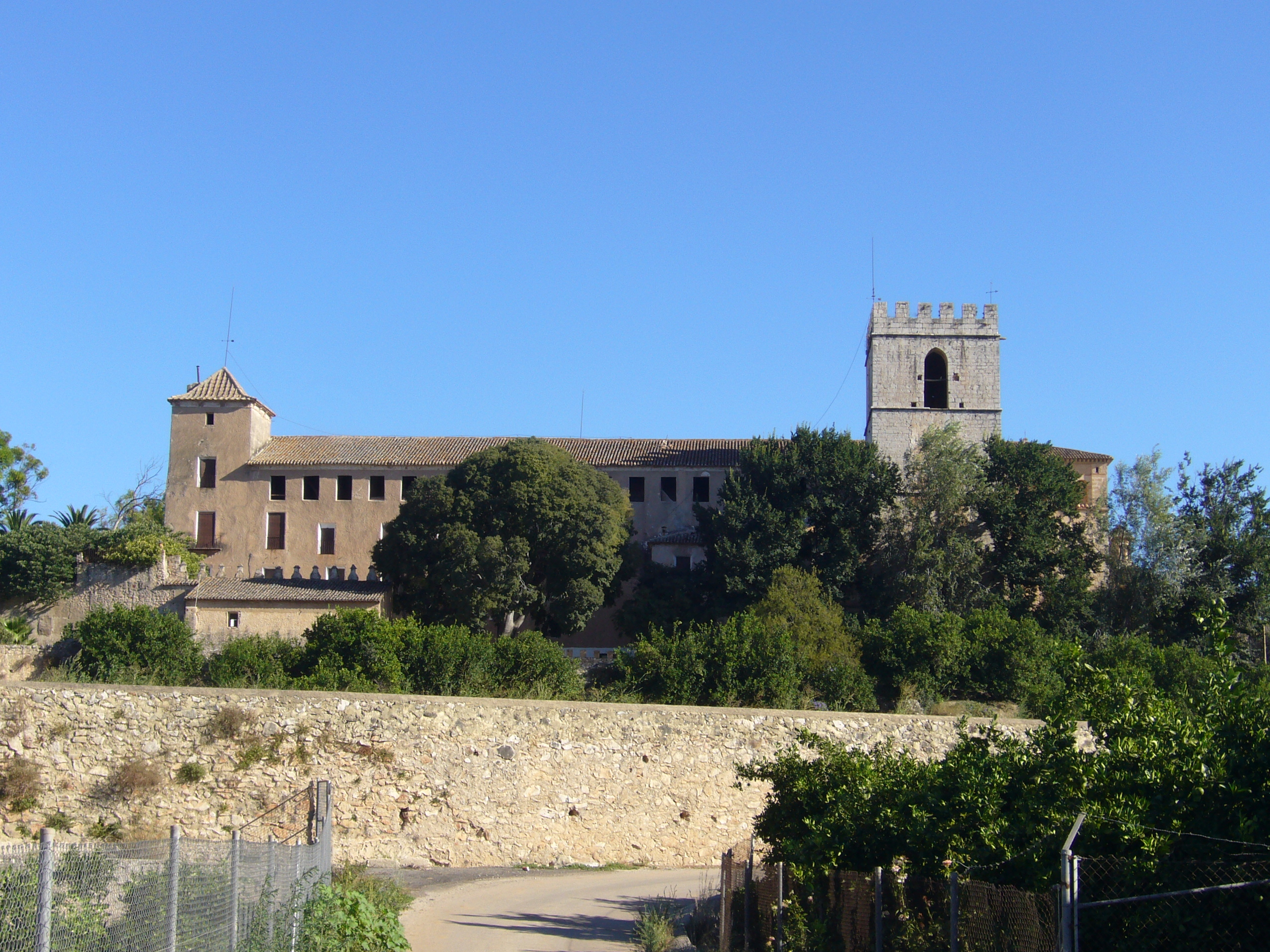
- Monastery of Sant Jeroni de Cotalba
- Length: 12.4 km (7.7 mi)
- Location: Spain
- Designation: Footpath
- Use: Hiking, Mountain biking
- Highest point: 600 m (2,000 ft)
- Difficulty: Middle
- Season: All year
- Sights: Historical center of Ròtova; Historical center of Alfauir; Gothic aqueduct of the Monastery of Sant Jeroni de Cotalba; Monastery of Sant Jeroni de Cotalba; Borró Castle; Palace of the Counts of Ròtova; River Vernisa; Alto del Águila; Valley of Marchuquera; Falconera and Ador saws

Map of the PR-CV 100
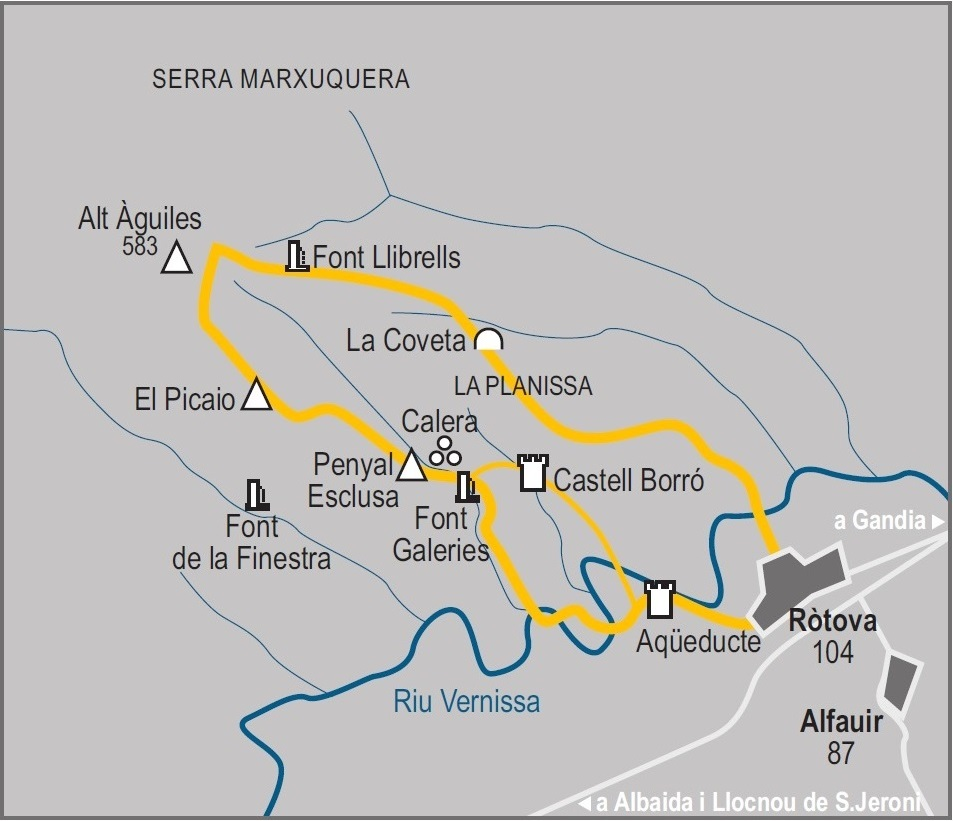

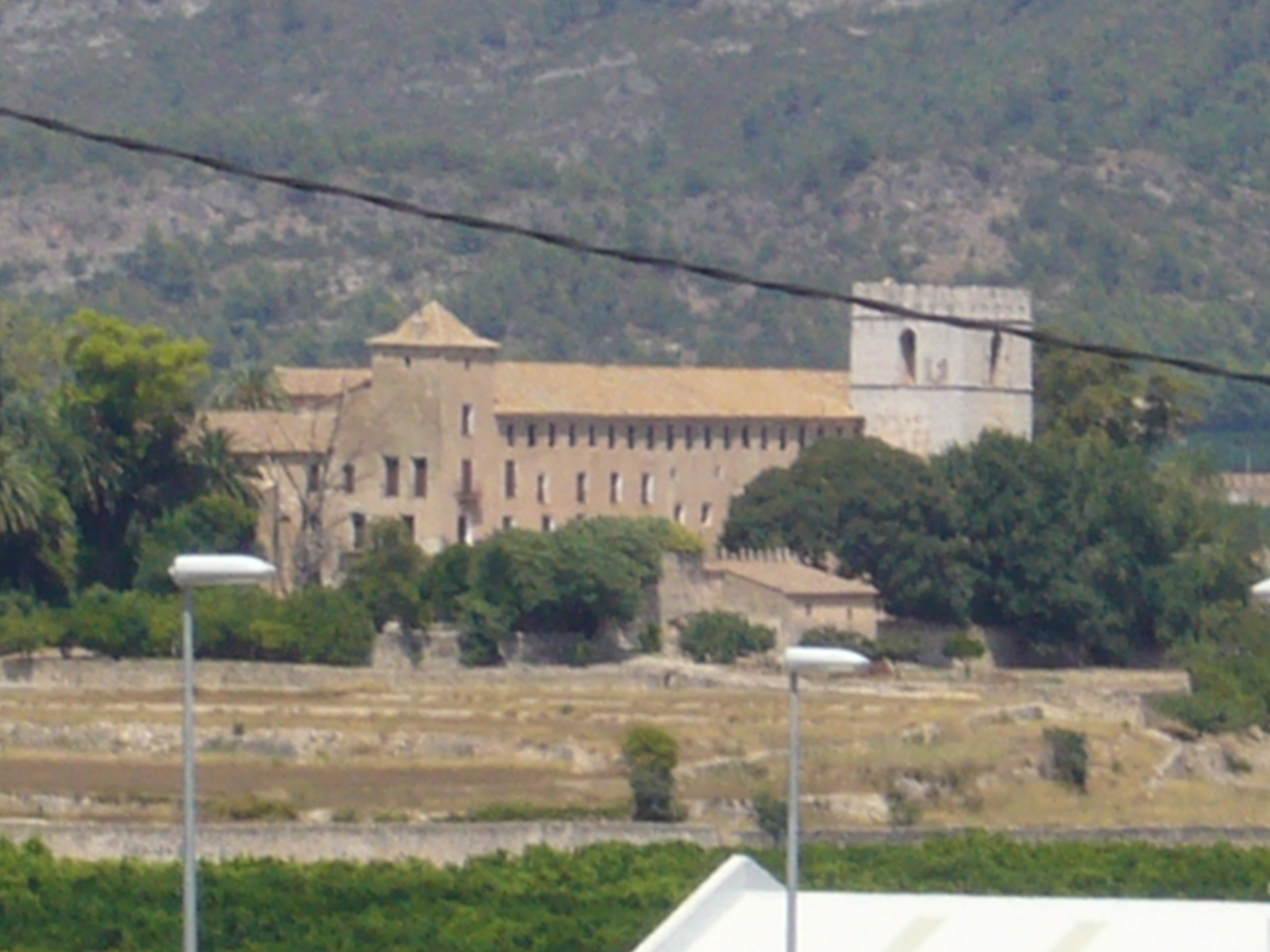
Monastery of Sant Jeroni de Cotalba, in Alfauir (Valencia).

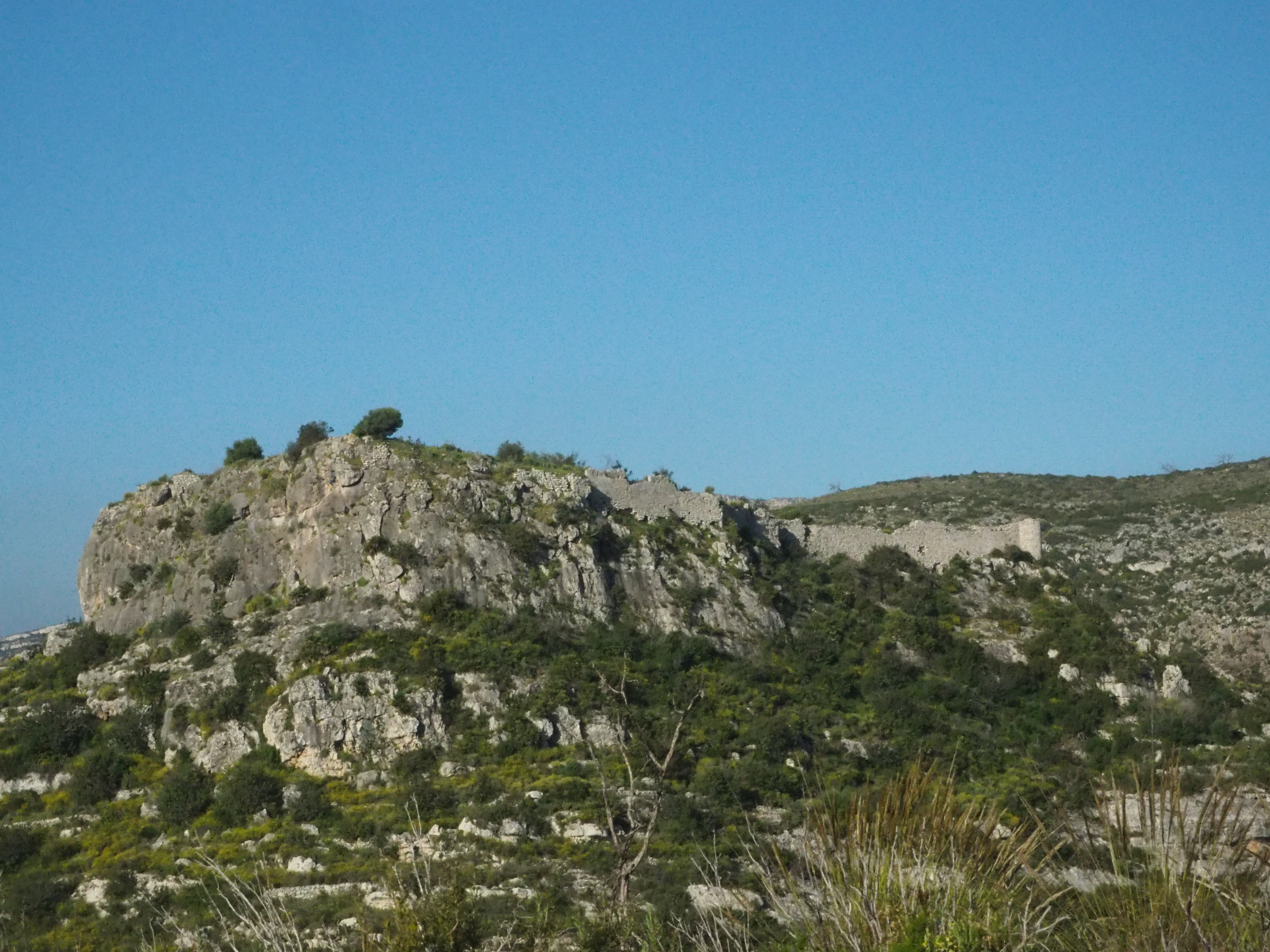
Castle of Borró, in Ròtova (Valencia).

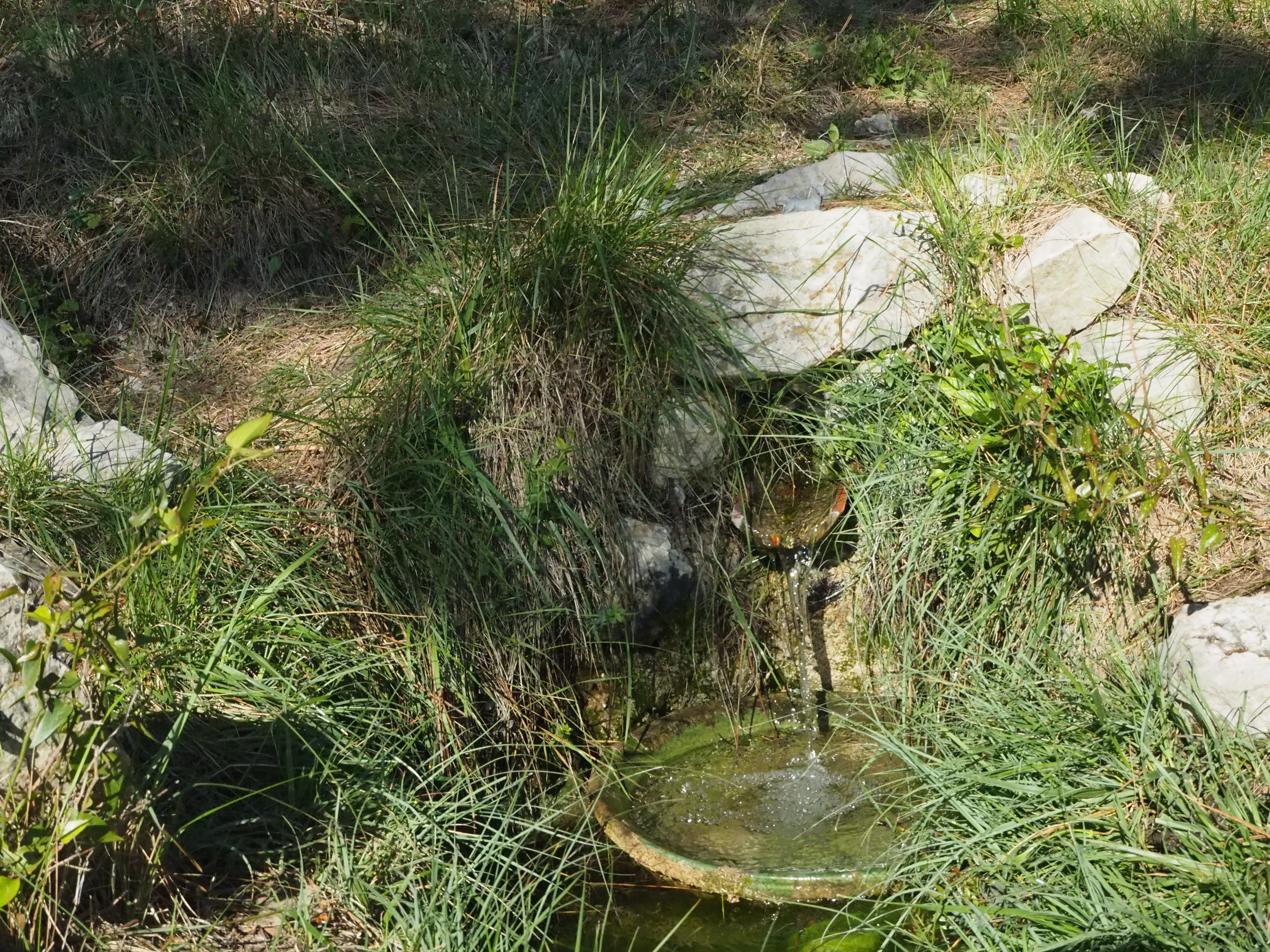
Fountain "Llibrell", in Ròtova (Valencia).

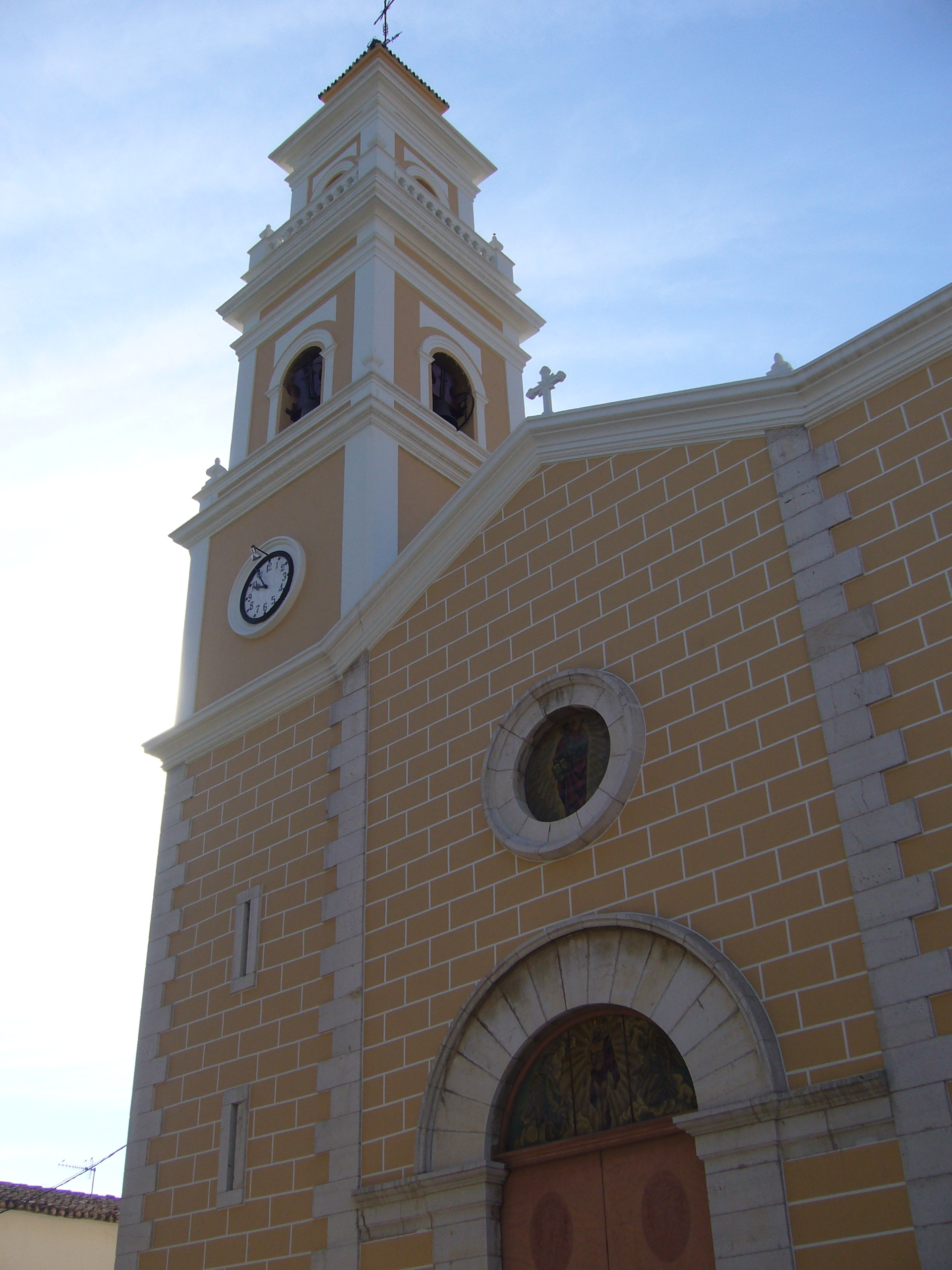
Church of San Bartolomé, in Ròtova (Valencia).

The route PR-CV 100 is a short-distance footpath of the Valencian Community (Spain) that goes from Ròtova (Valencia) to the Monastery of Sant Jeroni de Cotalba, in Alfauir (Valencia), crossing different natural places and monuments, saws, rivers, etc., all of them of great landscape and cultural interest.

The official name of the route PR-CV 100 is "Rotova's Paths - The ways of the Marchuquera Saw". The route was promoted by the "Centre Excursioniste de Ròtova" and authorized by the Federation of Mountain's Sports and Climbing of the Valencian Community (FEMECV).

== Characteristics ==
- Distance: 12,400 km.
- Time: 5 hours.
- Difficulty: Middle.
- Maximum altitude: 600 m.
- Type: Circular.

== Itinerary ==
- Ròtova
- Ghotic aqueduct of the Monastery of Sant Jeroni de Cotalba
- Monastery of Sant Jeroni de Cotalba
- Fountain Galerías
- Horno de cal
- Peñal
- La Esclusa
- El Picayo
- Alto del Águila
- Fountain Barreño
- La Coveta
- Ròtova

The route possesses a variant from "Fuente Galerías" (Galerias Fountain) to the Borró castle and since "Fuente de Borró" (Borró Fountain) to Rótova (1 hour).

== Places of interest ==
- Historical centers of Rótova and Alfauir
- Monastery of Sant Jeroni de Cotalba
- Borró Castle
- Palace of the Counts of Ròtova
- River Vernisa, aqueducts and construccions of the bank
- Alto del Águila
- Valley of the Marchuquera and views of La Safor
- Falconera and Ador saws

== Signposting ==
The whole route is marked by both horizontal lines white and yellow, typical of the short-distance footpath.

== Recreative facilities ==
Refuges:

- Refuge Casa dels Garcies (Centre Excursioniste de Ròtova)

Recreative areas:

- La Font del Llop (Terrateig)

== Information ==
- Tourist Info Office of Rótova
- Tourist Info Office of Gandia

== See also ==
- Monastery of Sant Jeroni de Cotalba
- Route of the Monasteries of Valencia
- Route of the Borgias
- Route of the Valencian classics
- Ròtova
- Alfauir
