= Influence of Arabic on other languages =

Arabic has had a great influence on other languages, especially in vocabulary. The influence of Arabic has been most profound in those countries visited by Islam or Islamic power.

Arabic loanwords have made their way into languages as diverse as Abkhaz, Afrikaans, Amharic, Albanian, Armenian, Assyrian, Azerbaijani, Balochi, Bengali, Berber, Bosnian, Bulgarian, Catalan, Chechen, Circassian, Croatian, English, French, Georgian, Greek, Gujarati, Hausa, Hebrew, Hindi, Hungarian, Indonesian, Italian, Kazakh, Kurdish, Kyrgyz, Macedonian, Malay, Mongolian, Montenegrin, Nepali, Odia, Ossetian, Pashto, Persian, Portuguese, Punjabi, Romani, Romanian, Russian, Serbian, Sicilian, Spanish, Sindhi, Somali, Swahili, Tagalog, Tajik, Tatar, Tigrinya, Turkish, Turkmen, Ukrainian, Urdu, Uyghur, Uzbek, Visayan, Wolof, Xhosa, Yoruba, and Zulu, as well as into other languages within the countries where these languages are spoken. Some languages such as Maltese and Nubi outright derive from Arabic, rather than merely borrowing vocabulary. Arabic words were being used from the Iberian Peninsula all the way to Maritime Southeast Asia prior to the spread of European international words.

Spanish has one of the largest Arabic-influenced vocabularies of any European language— around 8%— due to Arab rule mainly in Southern Iberia, a region that was known as Al-Andalus, from 711 until 1492; however, Spain's re-Christianization and resulting loss of contact with Arabic culture has led to a significant shift in both meaning and pronunciation of Spanish words of Arabic etymology.

The terms borrowed range from religious terminology (like Berber taẓallit, "prayer" < salat), academic terms (like Persian manteq, "logic"), to everyday conjunctions (like Hindi/Urdu lekin, "but"). Most Berber varieties (such as Kabyle), along with Swahili, borrow numbers from Arabic. Most religious terms used by Muslims around the world are direct borrowings from Arabic, such as ṣalāt, 'prayer' and imām, 'prayer leader'. In languages not directly in contact with the Arab world, Arabic loanwords are often mediated by other languages rather than being transferred directly from Arabic; for example many older Arabic loanwords in Hausa were borrowed from Kanuri. Arabic has also influenced the names of the days of the week in a number of languages, Indonesian, Lezgian, Malagasy, Malay, Somali, Swahili, Tausaug, Yakan.

Outside the Muslim world, there are more limited borrowings from Arabic, usually to denote vegetables and other articles in commerce, such as "aubergine", "alcohol" and also some other terms like "admiral". Among European languages, these mostly were transmitted through Spanish and Turkish.

== Interlingua ==
Dozens of Arabic words occur in Interlingua, frequently because their co-occurrence in such languages as English, French, Italian, Spanish, and Portuguese can be used to verify their internationality. Many of these words entered Interlingua's vocabulary through Spanish. Arabic words in Interlingua include "algebra", "alcohol", "cifra" (cypher), "magazin", "sucro" (sugar), "zenit", and "zero".

== Austronesian languages ==
=== Javanese ===
There are far fewer Arabic loanwords in Javanese than Sanskrit loanwords, and they are usually concerned with Islamic religion. Nevertheless, some words have entered the basic vocabulary, such as pikir ("to think", from the Arabic fikr), badan ("body"), mripat ("eye", thought to be derived from the Arabic ma'rifah, meaning "knowledge" or "vision"). However, these Arabic words typically have native Austronesian or Sanskrit alternatives: pikir = galih, idhĕp (Austronesian) and manah, cipta, or cita (from Sanskrit); badan = awak (Austronesian) and slira, sarira, or angga (from Sanskrit); and mripat = mata (Austronesian and Tagalog [Philippines]) and soca or netra (from Sanskrit).

=== Malay and Indonesian ===
In Indonesian and Malaysian Malay, the loanwords from Arabic are mainly concerned with religion, in particular with Islam, but to a lesser extent Christianity. Nevertheless, some words have even entered the basic vocabulary; words of Arabic origin include dunia (from Arabic: دنيا dunya = the present world), Sabtu (from Arabic: السبت as-sabt = Saturday), khabar or kabar (خبر ḵabar = news), selamat/salam (سلام salām = a greeting), Jumaat or Jumat (الجمعة al-jumʿa = Friday), ijazah (إجازة ijāza = vacation), kitab (كتاب kitāb = book), nikah (نكاح nikāh = marriage or wedding), tertib (ترتيب tartīb = orderly) and kamus (قاموس qāmūs = dictionary).

==== Christian usage ====
Ilah (Arabic: إله) is the word for God even in Christian Bible translations.

Many early Bible translators, when they came across some unusual Hebrew words or proper names, used the Arabic cognates. In the newer translations this practice is discontinued. They now turn to Greek names or use the original Hebrew Word. For example, the name Jesus was initially translated as 'Isa (Arabic: عيسى), but is now spelt as Yesus. Several ecclesiastical terms derived from Arabic still exist in Indonesian and Malaysian clerical use.

The Malay word for bishop is uskup (from Arabic: اسقف usquf = bishop, ultimately from Ancient Greek episkopos). This in turn makes the derived term for "archbishop" uskup agung (literally great bishop), which is combining the Arabic word with an Old Javanese word. The term imam (from Arabic: امام imām = leader, prayer leader) is used to translate a Catholic priest, beside its more common association with an Islamic prayer leader. Some Protestant denominations refer to their congregation as jemaat (from Arabic: جماعة jamā'a = group, community). Even the name of the Bible in Indonesian translation is Alkitab (from Arabic: كتاب kitāb = book), which literally means "the Book".

=== Tagalog ===
Arabic influence on Tagalog is largely indirect, occurring through two principal channels: contact with Islamized Malay-speaking polities in precolonial Southeast Asia, and later through Spanish, which itself contains a substantial number of Arabic loanwords due to centuries of contact during the period of Al-Andalus.

Unlike Malay or Indonesian, Tagalog did not undergo widespread Islamization, and therefore Arabic loanwords are fewer in number and are not predominantly religious. Nevertheless, several Arabic-derived terms entered Tagalog prior to Spanish colonization via Malay trade and cultural exchange, particularly in abstract vocabulary related to knowledge, values, and social relations. These words are often fully nativized and perceived as indigenous by speakers. Examples include salamat (“thanks”, from Arabic salāmah سلامة via Malay selamat), alam (“knowledge” or “awareness”, from Arabic ʿilm علم), hukom ("judge", from Arabic ḥukm حُكْم via Malay hukum), and hikayat ("persuasion", from Arabic hikāyat حِكَايَة).

During the Spanish colonial period, additional Arabic-derived vocabulary entered Tagalog through Spanish, particularly terms associated with material culture, administration, timekeeping, and household items. These words often preserve the Arabic definite article al- as part of the loanword, reflecting their transmission through Iberian Arabic into Spanish. Examples include alkansiya ('piggy bank'), alkohol ('alcohol', from al-kuḥl), alahas ('jewelry'), asukal ('sugar', from as-sukkar), and almusal ('breakfast').

== Berber languages ==
Most Berber languages have a high percentage of borrowing and influence from the Arabic language, as well as from other languages. For example, Arabic loanwords represent 35% to 46% of the total vocabulary of the Kabyle language, and represent 51.7% of the total vocabulary of Tarifit. Almost all Berber languages took from Arabic the pharyngeal fricatives /ʕ/ and /ħ/, the (nongeminated) uvular stop /q/, and the voiceless pharyngealized consonant /ṣ/.

The influence of Arabic, the process of spirantization, and the absence of labialization have caused the consonant systems of Berber languages to differ significantly by region. Berber languages found north of, and in the northern half of, the Sahara have greater influence from Arabic, including that of loaned phonemes, than those in more southern regions, like Tuareg. Many Berber languages have lost use of their original numerals due to the influence of Arabic, such as Tarifit which lost all except one.

== English ==
Like other European languages, English contains many words derived from Arabic, often through other European languages, especially Spanish. Among them is every-day vocabulary like "sugar" (sukkar), "cotton" (quṭn) or "magazine" (maḫāzin). More recognizable are words like "algebra" (al-jabr), "alcohol" (al-kuhūl), "alchemy" ("al-kimiya"), "alkali", "cypher" and "zenith" (see list of English words of Arabic origin).

A more indirect form of influence is the use of certain Latinate words in an unclassical sense, derived from their use in Latin translations of medieval Arabic philosophical works (e.g. those of Averroes), which entered the scholastic vocabulary and later came into normal use in modern languages. Examples are "information" to mean the imparting or acquisition of knowledge (Arabic taṣawwur, mental impression or representation, from a root meaning "form") and "intention" (Arabic ma^{c}nā, meaning). These words may almost be regarded as calques.

== Indic Languages ==
=== Bengali ===
The Bengali language as spoken by the Muslim-majority Bengalis, has gained Arabic vocabulary both directly, as the language of Islam and its literature, but also indirectly as a consequence of Arabic-influenced Persian being an official language in Bengal for over 500 years. During the late medieval period, a number of Bengali Muslim writers also wrote Bengali using the Arabic script. In the coastal Chittagonian dialect, the Arabic influence is magnified with researchers considering half of the dialect's lexicon to be of Arabic origin. This form of Bengali is referred to as Dobhashi.

=== Gujarati ===
The Gujarati language (i.e., the one heavily influenced by Arabic and Persian) is referred to as Lisan ud-Dawat.

=== Hindustani (Hindi and Urdu) ===
Hindustani language (and especially the Urdu register; but also the colloquial Hindi register to a certain extent) has as a substantial number of loanwords from Persian and Arabic (both directly as well as via Persian). Hindustani contains around 5,500 words of Persian and Arabic origin.

== Iranian Languages ==
=== Kurdish ===
Kurdish differs from other Iranian languages such as Persian in sharing the same or close geographical spaces with Arabic-speaking populations, especially in Upper Mesopotamia. The influenced introduced the pharyngeal phonemes are found in varying degrees in both Central Kurd- ish and Northern Kurdish. They are retained in most of the Arabic loanwords originally bearing them.

=== Persian ===
The Arab conquest of Iran lasted for two centuries, from the 7th to the 9th CE. Arabic gradually replaced Middle Persian as an official language and Arabic became the language of the Persian intellectuals during Golden Age of Islam. During this period, many Arabic words were imported into the Persian language. Persian words of Arabic origin especially include Islamic terms. Arabic has had an extensive influence on the Persian lexicon, with a considerable portion of the lexicon derived from Arabic roots, including some of the Arabic plural patterns. Arabic grammatical elements have also been imported into the Persian language and are used in both Arabic loan words as well as Persian and other non-Arabic words. Arabic has also had an influence on Persian phonology and syntax.

These Arabic words have been imported and lexicalized in Persian. So, for instance, the Arabic plural form for kitāb (كتاب) ["book"] is kutub (كتب) obtained by the root derivation system. In Persian, the plural for the lexical word ketâb is obtained by simply adding the Persian plural morpheme hā: ketāb+hā → ketābhā (كتاب‌ها). Also, any new Persian words can only be pluralized by the addition of this plural morpheme since the Arabic root system is not a productive process in Persian. In addition, since the plurals formed by the Arabic morphological system constitute only a small portion of the Persian vocabulary (about 5% in the Shiraz corpus), it is not necessary to include them in the morphology; they are instead listed in the dictionary as irregular forms.

In fact, among Iranians there have been sporadic efforts as far back as the Safavid Empire to revive Persian and diminish the use of Arabic loanwords in their language. Both Pahlavi Shahs supported such efforts in the 20th century by creating the academy of Persian Language and Literature. In 1934, Reza Shah ordered to rebuild tomb of Ferdowsi, who is regarded as the savior of Persian language, and set up a ceremony in Mashhad, celebrating a thousand years of Persian literature since the time of Ferdowsi, titled Ferdowsi Millenary Celebration (Persian: جشن هزاره فردوسی).

Academy of Persian language and literature after the Iranian revolution continued its striving to protect the integrity of the Persian language. However, the attention of the academy has been turned towards the persistent infiltration of Persian, like many other languages, with English words, as a result of the globalization process. Since the 1980s, the academy constantly campaigns for the use of the Persian equivalents of these new English loanwords. It also has the task of linguistically deriving such words from existing Persian roots if no such equivalents exist, and actively promoting the adoption of these new coinages instead of their English equivalents in the daily lives of the Persian-speaking people in Iran, Afghanistan and Tajikistan. However, modern Persian is deeply rooted in Arabic with 50–80% of its vocabulary being of Arabic origin. To render a style of modern Persian devoid of Arabic influence is almost impossible, and a purge of foreign influences on the language similar to the Turkish language reform would be unrealistic in Persian.

=== Pashto ===
Arab conquest of Afghanistan brought Arabic words to Pashto, either directly from Arabic or through Persian.

== Romance (Latin) Languages ==
Arabic has influenced a number of Romance languages in different time periods, most notably the languages of the Iberian Peninsula, and especially Spanish.

=== Catalan and Valencian ===
Arabic has notably influenced the Catalan language, and especially the southern dialects (including the Valencian ones). Due to almost eight centuries of Arabic presence in the Iberian Peninsula (Al-Andalus), hundreds of words from many fields (including Arabic inventions) have been adapted into Catalan; among many are séquia ("irrigation ditch"), nòria ("waterwheel, noria"), algorfa ("loft"), magatzem ("warehouse"), alfàbia ("earthenware jar"), barnús ("bathrobe"), aladroc ("anchovy"), dacsa ("corn"), safanòria ("carrot"), carxofa ("artichoke"), albergínia ("aubergine"), xirivia ("parsnip"), alfals ("alfalfa"), albercoc ("apricot"), tramús ("lupin"), corfa ("bark, peel"), xara ("thicket"), matalaf/matalàs ("mattress"), alacrà ("scorpion"), fardatxo ("lizard") alfàb(r)ega ("basil"), etc. and expressions such as a la babalà ("randomly, to God's will") and a betzef ("abundance, plenty").

==== Toponymy ====
Many places of the Land of Valencia, and also a few from Catalonia and the Balearic Islands, have names of partial or total Arabic origin, such as Algemesí, Alzira, Almassora, etc.

A large number of places have the Arabic roots Beni, Bena and Bene, which mean "son of" or "sons of": Benidorm, Benimuslem, Benilloba, Benillup, Benimantell, Benimarfull, Benicàssim, Benissa, Benissoda, Benirredrà, Benaguasil, Benasau, Beneixama, Benaixeve, Beneixida, Benetússer, Beniflà, Beniardà, Beniarrés, Beniatjar, Benicarló, Benicolet, Benicull de Xúquer, Benidoleig, Benifaió, Benifairó de la Valldigna, Benifairó de les Valls, Benifato, Benigànim, Benigembla, Benimodo, Benimassot, Benimeli, Beniparrell, Benavites, Benafigos, Benitatxell, etc.

=== French ===
French is widely spoken as a second language in France's former colonies in the Maghreb. Therefore, the list of words that are used or incorporated into the French spoken in this region (as a result of code-switching, convenience or lack of an equivalent term in standard French) is potentially endless. Such arabisms, are accepted within the local context but would not normally be known by non-maghrebi French speakers.

Arabic-derived words have entered standard or metropolitan French from two main sources. As is the case for many other European languages, one principal source was Spanish. The other was directly from Maghrebi Arabic as a result of the occupation and colonisation of the Maghreb, particularly Algeria, in the 19th and 20th centuries. Examples of the latter include 'bled', a slang term for place of origin, following this word's usage in the Maghreb, as opposed to the Standard Arabic balad, 'country', along with the Maghrebi term 'kif kif' and 'tabeeb', a slang term for 'doctor'. A small number of Arabic terms have entered mainstream French as a result of immigration from North Africa which began after the independence of Algeria. Other slang terms such as "niquer" (to have sex) are older borrowings from Arabic during Napoleon's occupation of Egypt (1798-1801).

=== Italian ===
The majority of words of Arabic origin entered Italian through Sicilian.

=== Portuguese ===
Between the 9th century and up to 1249 when the Arabs were expelled from the Algarve, Portuguese acquired words (between 400 and 600 estimate) from Arabic by influence of Moorish Iberia. Although the native population spoke the Lusitanian-Mozarabic, they kept some Mozarabic-derived words. These are often recognizable by the initial Arabic article a(l)-, and include common words such as aldeia "village" from الضيعة aḍ-ḍī^{c}ah, alface "lettuce" from الخس al-khass, armazém "warehouse" from المخزن al-makhzan, and azeite "olive oil" from الزيت az-zayt. From Arabic came also the grammatically peculiar word oxalá "God willing", which is an archaism. The frequency of Arabic toponyms is more evident in the south of the country.

=== Sicilian ===
In AD 535, Emperor Justinian I made Sicily a Byzantine province, and for the second time in Sicilian history, the Greek language became a familiar sound across the island (Hull, 1989). As the power of the Byzantine Empire waned, Sicily was progressively conquered by Arab Muslims, from the mid 9th to mid 10th centuries. The Arabic language influence is noticeable in around 800 Sicilian words, many of which relate to agriculture and related activities (Hull and Ruffino).

Sicilian words of Arabic origin include azzizzari (to embellish, from ^{c}azīz; precious, beautiful), cafisu (measure for liquids, from qafiz), gebbia (artificial pond, from gabiya), giuggiulena (sesame seed, from giulgiulan, ràisi (leader, from ra'īs), saja (canal, from saqiya), and zibbibbu (a type of grape, from zabib). (Giarrizzo)

=== Spanish ===
The Spanish language has been influenced by Arabic as a result of the long Islamic presence within the Iberian Peninsula, beginning with the Umayyad conquest in 711-718 AD; the last Islamic kingdom in the Peninsula was conquered by Christians in 1492 AD. Modern day Spanish, also called castellano ("Castilian"), gradually evolved from Vulgar Latin and was influenced by Arabic from an early date. Arabic influence increased when the expanding Kingdom of Castile spread southward, conquering territory from Muslim kingdoms during the Christian Reconquista. The Mozarabs, that had lived under Muslim rulers and had spoken their own varieties of Arabic-influenced Romance (known today by scholars as the Mozarabic languages), probably had a formative influence on the language and indirectly contributed Arabic vocabulary. The presence of Mozarabic refugees can explain the presence of Arabic toponyms in areas of Northern Spain where Islamic rule was shorter. The only Iberian Muslim kingdom in which Arabic was the sole language at all levels of society was the Kingdom of Granada in the time of the Nasrid dynasty.

In many cases, both Arabic and Latin derived words are used for the same meaning in Spanish. For example, aceituna and oliva (olive), alacrán and escorpión (scorpion), jaqueca and migraña (headache) or alcancía and hucha (piggy bank). The influence of Arabic, whether directly or through Mozarabic, is more noticeable in the Spanish dialects of southern Spain, where the Arabic influence was heavier and of a much longer duration. The same difference also exists between Catalan and Valencian.

The Arabic influence can be seen in hundreds of toponyms but with a few minor exceptions, its influence on Spanish is primarily lexical. It is estimated that there are over two thousand Arabic loanwords and three thousand derivatives in the Spanish dictionary. In the Middle Ages, Spanish was the main route by which Arabic words entered other West European languages. The majority of these words are nouns, with a more limited number of verbs, adjectives, adverbs and one preposition. Everyday Arabic loanwords include aceite (oil, from az-zayt), alcalde (mayor, from al-qādī), azafata (stewardess, from سَفَط safaṭ), ahorrar (to save, from hurr), tarea (task, from tariha), ojalá (if God wills; I wish, from لو شاء الله law šaʾ allāh), and hasta (until, from hatta).

== Swahili ==
Historically it has been considered that around 15% - 20% of Swahili vocabulary consists of Arabic loanwords, including the name of the language (سَوَاحِلي sawāḥilī, a plural adjectival form of an Arabic word meaning 'of the coasts'). The loanwords date from the era of contact between Arab traders and the Bantu inhabitants of the east coast of Africa, which was also the time period when Swahili emerged as a lingua franca in the region.

== Turkic Languages ==
Arabic has influenced a number of Turkic languages, from Crimean Tatar, Tatar and Bashkir in Eastern Europe, Uyghur and Kazakh in Central Asia to Turkish and Gagauz in Anatolia and the Balkans.

=== Turkish ===
Following the adoption of Islam c. 950 by the Kara-Khanid Khanate and the Seljuq Turks, regarded as the cultural ancestors of the Ottomans, the administrative and literary languages of these states acquired a large collection of loanwords from Arabic (usually by way of Persian), as well as non-Arabic Persian words: a leading example of a Perso-Arabic influenced Turkic language was Chagatai, which remained the literary language of Central Asia until Soviet times. During the course of over six hundred years of the Ottoman Empire (c. 1299–1922), the literary and official language of the empire was a mixture of Turkish, Persian and Arabic, which differed considerably from the everyday spoken Turkish of the time, and is termed Ottoman Turkish.

After the foundation of the Republic of Turkey, and following the script reform, the Turkish Language Association (TDK) was established under the patronage of Mustafa Kemal Atatürk in 1932, with the aim of conducting research on Turkish. One of the tasks of the newly established association was to initiate a language reform to replace loanwords of Arabic and Persian origin with Turkish equivalents. By banning the usage of replaced loanwords in the press, the association succeeded in removing several hundred foreign words from the language, thus diminishing but by no means erasing the Arabic influence on Turkish.

== See also ==
- List of Arabic star names
- List of Arabic place names
