= Gorga, Spain =

Gorga
- Municipality
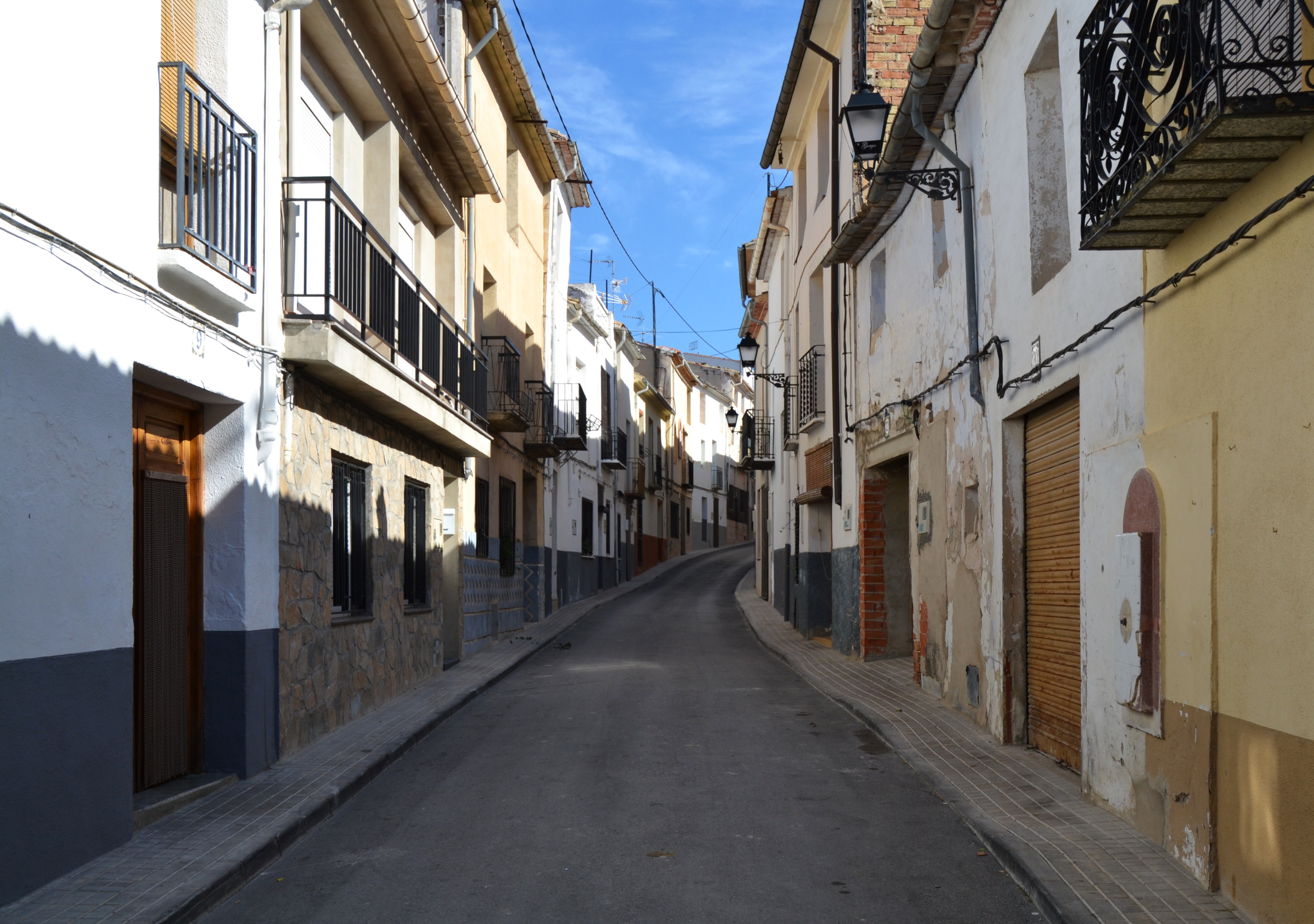
- Carrer Major

- Coat of arms

- Location in the Province of Alicante Gorga (Spain)
- Coordinates: 38°43′05″N 0°21′26″W
- Country: Spain
- Community: Valencia
- Province: Alacant / Alicante
- Comarca: Comtat

Government
  - Mayor: Blas Calbo Ferrándiz (PSPV-PSOE)

Area
  - Total: 9.11 km^{2} (3.52 sq mi)
- Elevation: 545 m (1,788 ft)

Population (2025-01-01)
  - Total: 286
  - Density: 31.4/km^{2} (81.3/sq mi)
- Demonym(s): gorguer, -a (Val.) gorguero, -a (Sp.)
- Time zone: UTC+1 (CET)
  - Summer (DST): UTC+2 (CEST)
- Official language(s): Valencian; Spanish

Gorga (Valencian: [ˈɡɔɾɣa], also [ˈɡɔɾɣɔ]; Spanish: [ˈɡoɾɣa]) is a Spanish village and municipality located in the comarca of Comtat, province of Alicante, in the Valencian Community.

== Geography ==
Located in a confluence of the valleys of Seta and Travadell, it borders with the municipalities of Balones, Benasau, Benilloba, Cocentaina, Millena, Penàguila and Quatretondeta.

== Gallery ==
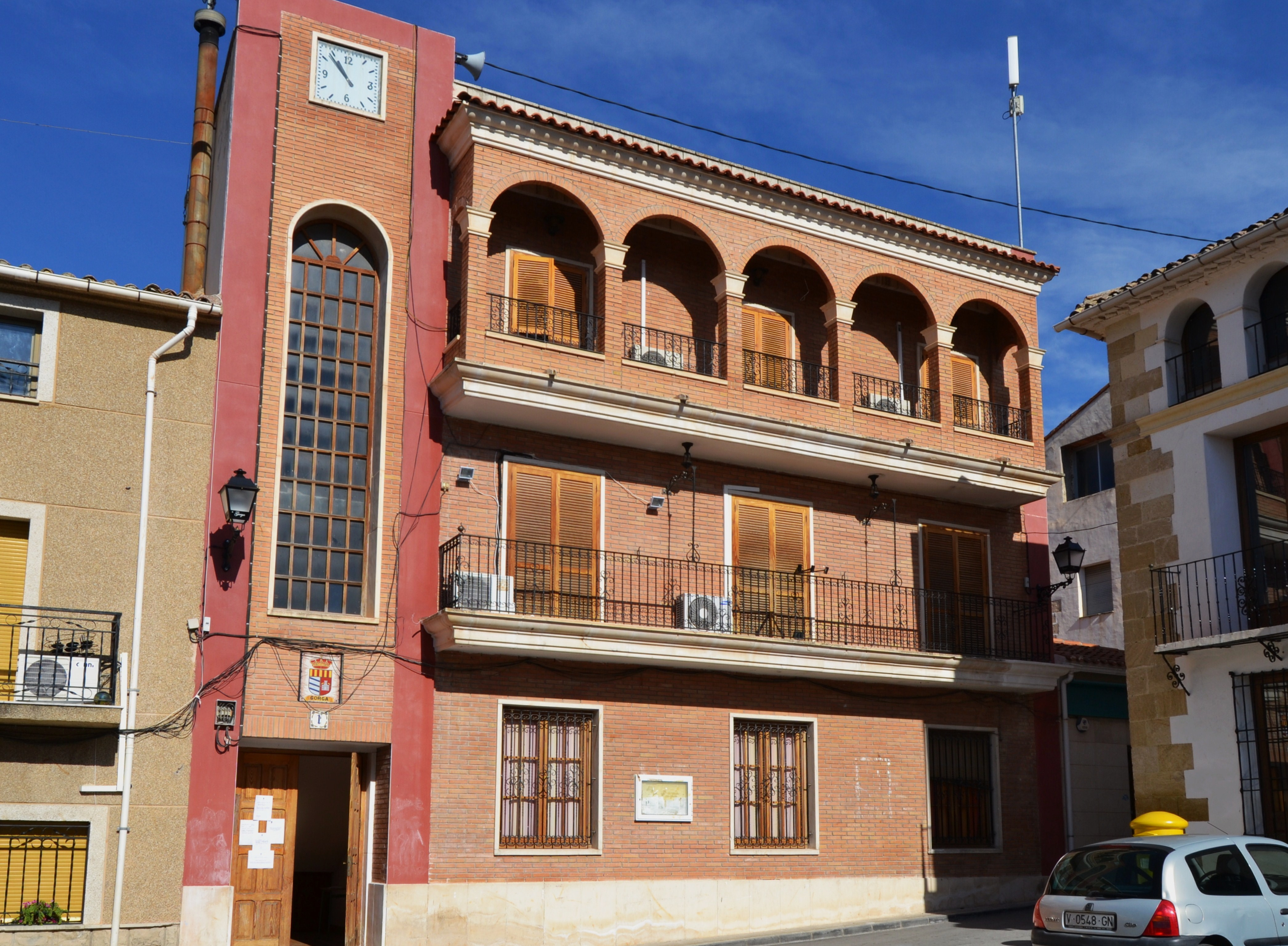
Town Hall

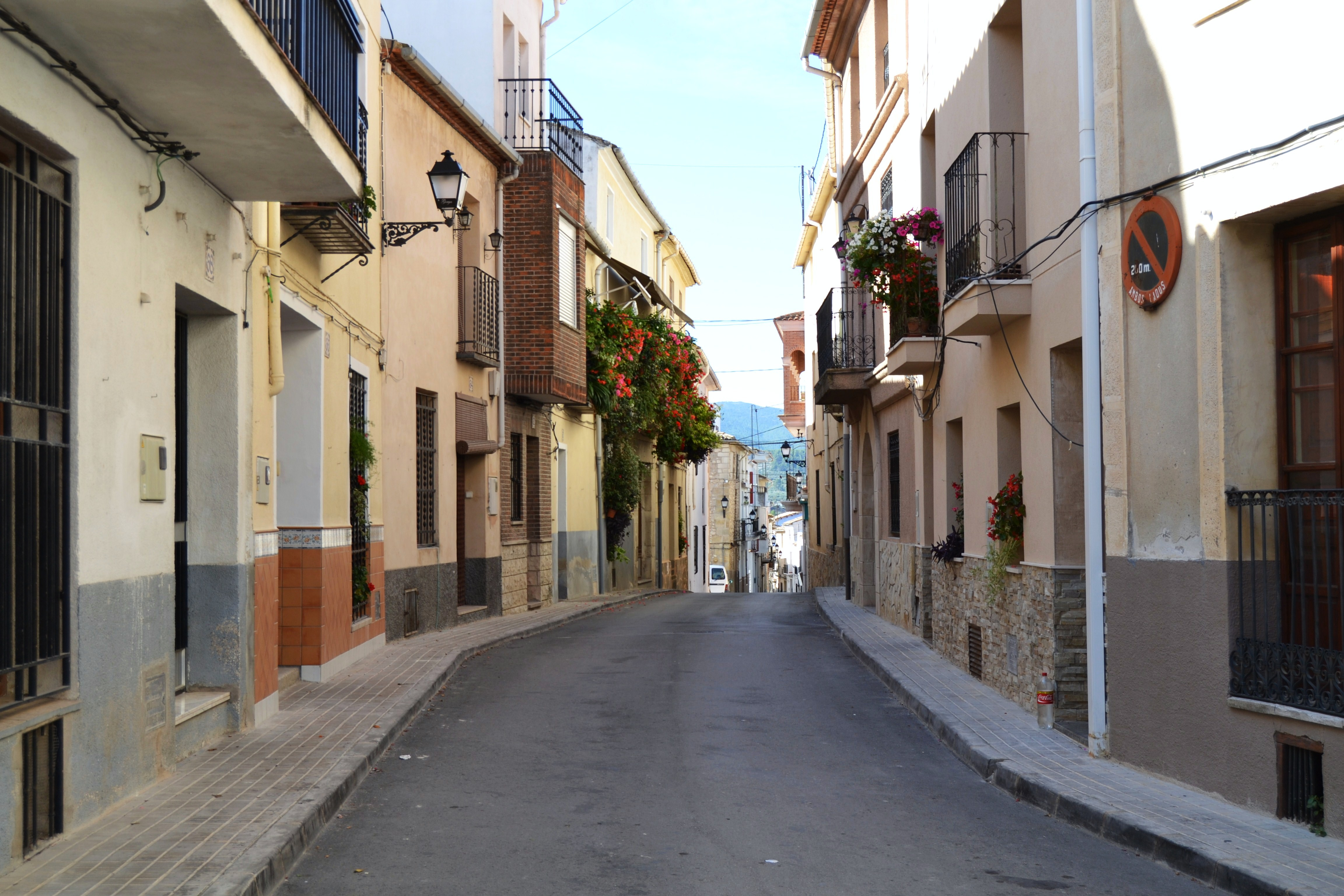
Carrer Major
