= Serpis =

River in Spain

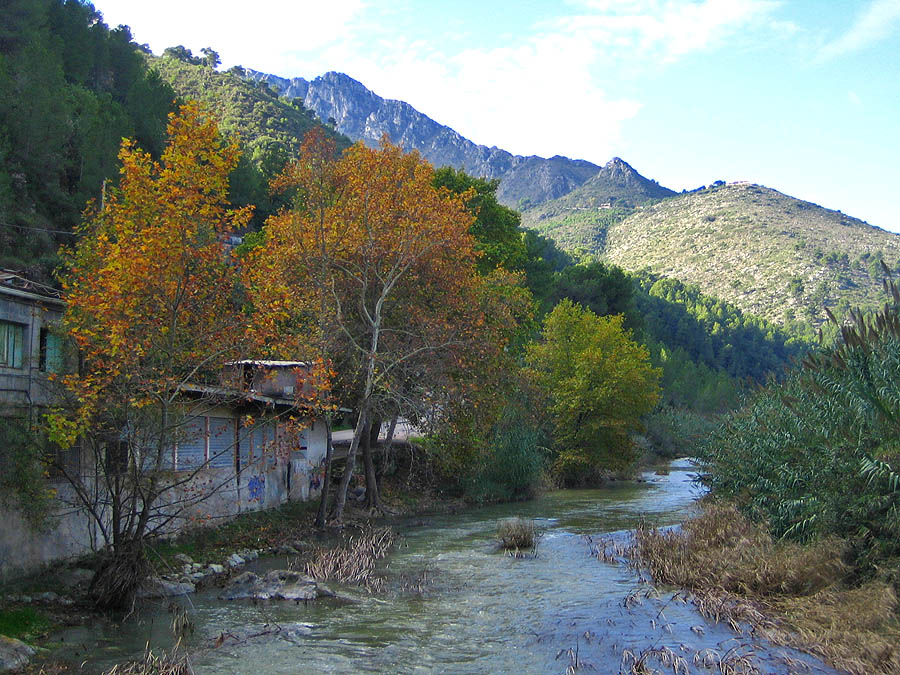
- The river near Vilallonga.

Location
- Country: Spain

Physical characteristics
- Source
  - location: Carrasqueta
- Mouth
  - location: Mediterranean Sea
- Length: 74.5 km (46.3 mi)
- Basin size: 752.8 km^{2} (290.7 sq mi)
- Discharge
  - average: 2.5 m^{3}/s (88 cu ft/s)

The Serpis (Valencian: [ˈseɾpis]) is a short coastal river in the provinces of Alicante and Valencia, in Spain.

The river starts at the feet of the Carrasqueta, a mountain area southwest to Alcoi, by the confluence of the Polop and Troncal streams. In its initial part the Serpis is intermittent. Near Alcoi it joins with the Barxell, coming from the Serra de Mariola, after which it has a regular course. Other cities it passes through include Cocentaina, L'Alqueria d'Asnar, Muro d'Alcoi, Gayanes and Beniarrés, where a dam creates an artificial lake; after the latter, the Serpis crosses L'Orxa, Vilallonga, Potries, Beniarjó, Almoines, El Real de Gandia and Gandia, where it flows into the Mediterranean Sea, shortly after receiving the waters of its main affluent, Vernisa river.

38°42′8.08″N 0°28′13.0″W
