= Alcocer de Planes =

Alcocer de Planes Alcosser
- municipality
- Coat of arms

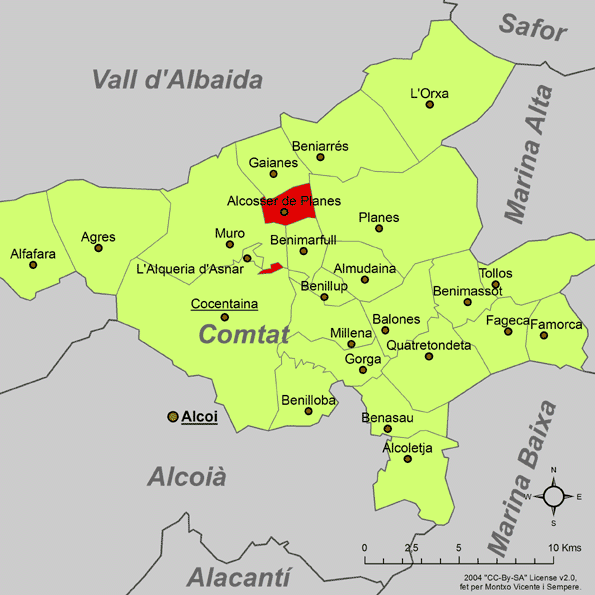
- Location in the comarca Vinalopó Medio

- Location within the Valencian Community
- Coordinates: 38°47′40″N 0°24′09″W
- Country: Spain
- Autonomous community: Valencian Community
- Province: Alacant / Alicante
- Comarca: Comtat

Area
  - Total: 4.39 km^{2} (1.69 sq mi)
- Elevation: 350 m (1,150 ft)

Population (2025-01-01)
  - Total: 263
  - Density: 59.9/km^{2} (155/sq mi)
  - Official language(s): Valencian and Spanish
- Demonyms: • alcosserí, -ina (Val.) • alcocerino, -a (Sp.)
- Distance to Alicante: 80 km (50 mi)

Alcocer de Planes (Spanish: [alkoˈθeɾ ðe ˈplanes]; Valencian: Alcosser [alkoˈseɾ]) is a municipality in the Valencian comarca of Comtat, in the province of Alicante, Spain.

It is situated on the shore of the Serpis river, south of the Serra de Benicadell, in the central part of the Foia de Cocentaina. It is bordered on the north by Gaianes, on the east by Planes, on the west by Muro d'Alcoi, and on the south by Benimarfull.
