= Agres =

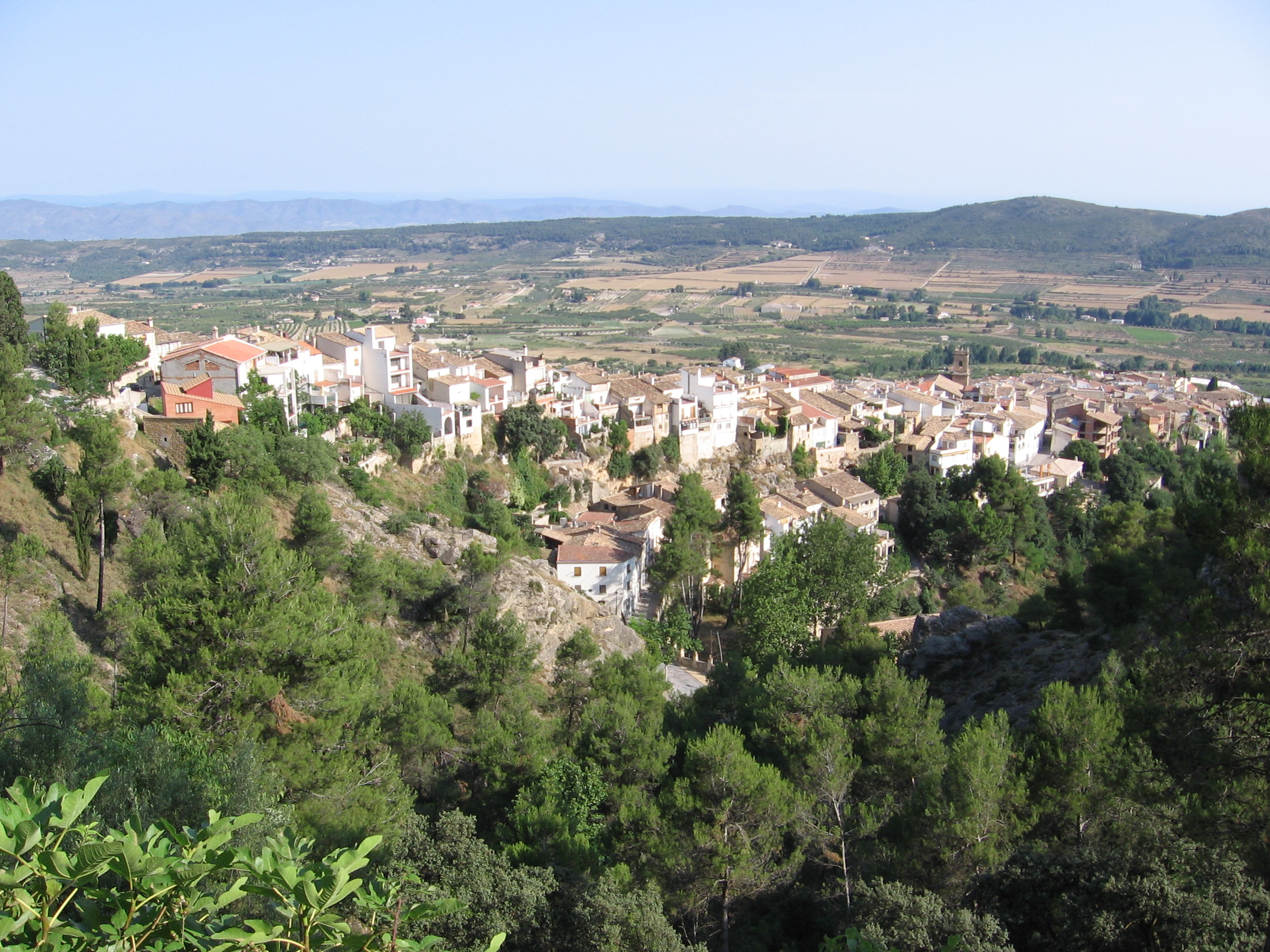
- Agres seen from the Montcabrer.

- Coat of arms

- Location within the Valencian Community
- Coordinates: 38°46′47″N 00°30′58″W
- Country: Spain
- Province: Alicante
- Comarca: Comtat

Government
  - Alcalde: Josep Manel Francès i Reig

Area
  - Total: 25.80 km^{2} (9.96 sq mi)
- Elevation: 722 m (2,369 ft)

Population (2025-01-01)
  - Total: 623
  - Density: 24.1/km^{2} (62.5/sq mi)
  - Language: Valencian
- Demonyms: Agresà, agresana (Catalan)
- Postcode: 03837
- Website: http://www.agres.es

Agres (Valencian and Spanish: [ˈaɣɾes]) is a town and municipality in the comarca of Comtat, in the province of Alicante, Valencian Community, Spain.

It is situated between the Serra de Mariola and the Serra d'Agullent. It is bordered by Agullent, Benissoda and Albaida to the north; Muro d'Alcoi and Cocentaina to the east; Alfafara to the west and Alcoi to the south.

== See also ==
- Serra Mariola Natural Park
