= Rafael Pérez y Pérez =

Spanish writer (1891–1984)

- Born: 18 September 1891; Quatretondeta, Province of Alicante, Spain
- Died: 24 April 1984 (aged 92); Quatretondeta, Province of Alicante, Spain
- Resting place: Quatretondeta, Province of Alicante, Spain
- Occupation: Novelist
- Writing career
- Pen name: Rafael Pérez y Pérez; R. Pérez y Pérez
- Language: Spanish language
- Period: 1909–71
- Genre: Romance

Rafael Pérez y Pérez (born 18 September 1891 in Quatretondeta, Province of Alicante, Spain – d. 24 April 1984 in Quatretondeta, Province of Alicante, Spain), was a popular Spanish writer of over 160 romantic novels from 1909 to 1971. He was one of the first writers to publish romance novels written in Spanish language. His novels have been translated into 22 languages, and had sold over 5 million copies by the year 1977, and some of his novels were adapted to film.

== Biography ==
Rafael Pérez y Pérez was born on 18 September 1891 in Quatretondeta, Province of Alicante, Spain. Amateur historian, in 1909 he won his first award with a historical monograph entitled Las Germanías de Valencia. He worked first as a teacher and then as primary education inspector. He began publishing in the 1920s, achieving great success until the 1940s, but he continued publishing until 1971, when his progressive blindness no longer allowed him to continue. His novels with a medieval setting were particularly successful. Five of his novels were adapted to film: Mariquita Monleón, Cuando pasa el amor, La niña de Ara, Muñequita and Inmaculada.

== Bibliography ==
=== Non-fiction ===
- Las Germanías de Valencia (1909)

=== Single novels ===
- La verdad en el amor (1922)
- El Monasterio de la Buena Muerte (1925)
- Inmaculada (1925)
- Levántate y anda (1925)
- El secretario (1926)
- El último cacique (1927)
- El hada Alegría (1930)
- Doña Sol (1931)
- La clavariesa (1931)
- Los cien caballeros de Isabel la Católica (1931)
- Madrinita buena (1931)
- Almas recias (1932)
- El verdadero amor (1932)
- Mariposa (1932)
- Un hombre cabal (1932)
- Cuento de invierno (1933)
- La señora (1933)
- Lo imposible (1933)
- Los dos caminos (1933)
- María Pura (1933)
- Muñequita (1933)
- Al borde de la leyenda (1934)
- Amor que no muere (1934)
- Esperanza (1934)
- La eterna historia y otras narraciones (1934)
- Mariquita Monleón (1934)
- Rebeldía (1934)
- Una niña loca (1934)
- Alfonso Queral (1935)
- Cuando pasa el amor (1935)
- El hombre del casco (1935)
- El secreto de Juan (1935)
- Palomita torcaz (1935)
- La niña de Ara (1936)
- Romace de amor (1936)
- Lengua de víbora (1939)
- La ciénaga (1940)
- Por la puerta falsa (1940)
- Cabeza de estopa (1941)
- El chófer de María Luz (1941)
- La chica del molinero (1941)
- La doncella de Loarre (1942)
- Sexta bandera (1942)
- El excelente conde (1943)
- La casa de Azlor (1943)
- Sor María de la Consolación (1944)
- Tentación (1944)
- La ocasión de Mariquita Guevara (1945)
- La que se reía del amor (1945)
- Azucenas en Castilla (1946)
- Noche blanca (1946)
- Renzo (1947)
- El sillón de la Marquesa Gersinda (1948)
- Clara María (1949)
- Crucero de amor (1949)
- El conde maldito (1949)
- El templario (1950)
- Amor y dinero (1951)
- Los cuatro primos (1951)
- Aquella noche (1952)
- El último Bernal (1952)
- El trovador bandolero (1953)
- El padrastro de Navarra (1954)
- La máscara verde (1954)
- La princesa Galsuinda (1954)
- Vivir es olvidar (1954)
- Baltasar de Zúñiga (1955)
- La golfilla del Avapiés (1955)
- La moza del Salt (1955)
- La torre del misterio (1955)
- El duende de palacio (1956)
- El vengador (1956)
- La prueba (1956)
- Los diamantes amarillos (1956)
- Aquella mujer (1957)
- El amor que vuelve (1957)
- La beata Zaragata (1957)
- Caminos torcidos (1958)
- El sobre azul (1958)
- Jimeno de Asúa (1958)
- Yolanda (1958)
- La alquería de las rosas (1959)
- La masía del buen amor (1959)
- La villana (1959)
- Farsa de amor (1960)
- Tres meses de licencia (1960)
- Un hombre y el amor (1960)
- Una fiera (1960)
- Almas a la deriva (1961)
- La viuda del pescador (1961)
- Una mujer de piedra (1961)
- Juego de orgullos (1962)
- Los dos almirantes (1962)
- El "hereu" de En Sarriá (1963)
- El caso de Marcela (1963)
- El lobo de la falconera (1963)
- El enigma de la charca (1964)
- El forjador de reyes (1964)
- Fuerza mayor (1964)
- Novios de verano (1964)
- A espaldas del amor (1965)
- El monje loco (1965)
- Leonor de Castilla (1965)
- Un caballero leonés (1966)
- Una boda extraña (1966)
- La bruja de la ermita (1967)
- La casa maldita (1967)
- El doncel de doña Urraca (1968)
- Ha llegado el amor (1968)
- La eterna enamorada (1968)
- El hombre del tajo en la cara (1969)
- Romántica aventura (1969)
- Teresa tenía razón (1970)
- La dama de Alzamora (1971)

=== Los Caballeros de Loyola Series ===
1. Los Caballeros de Loyola (1929)
2. La gloria de amar (1934)

=== Duquesa Inés Series ===
1. Duquesa Inés (1930)
2. Por el honor del nombre (1932)

=== Dos Españas Series ===
- Dos Españas (1939)
1. Elena (1939)
2. Juan Ignacio (1939)
3. De una España a otra (1939)

=== Entre el aviador y el millonario Series ===
1. Entre el aviador y el millonario (1943)
2. Sin amor (1943)

=== El Señor de Albarracín Series ===
1. El Señor de Albarracín (1945)
2. El idilio de una reina (1945)

=== Martinejo Series ===
1. Martinejo (1947)
2. Intrigas en la corte (1947)

=== El valido del Rey Series ===
1. El valido del Rey (1948)
2. La bastarda del condestable (1948)
3. El Castillo de Escalona (1948)

=== El segundón Series ===
1. El segundón (1953)
2. El misterio de Gistaín (1953)
