= Arabism =

Arabism may refer to:

- an effect of the influence of Arabic on other languages
- Pan-Arabism
- Arabist

== See also ==
- Arabization
