= Alcoleja =

Alcoleja Alcolecha
- Municipality
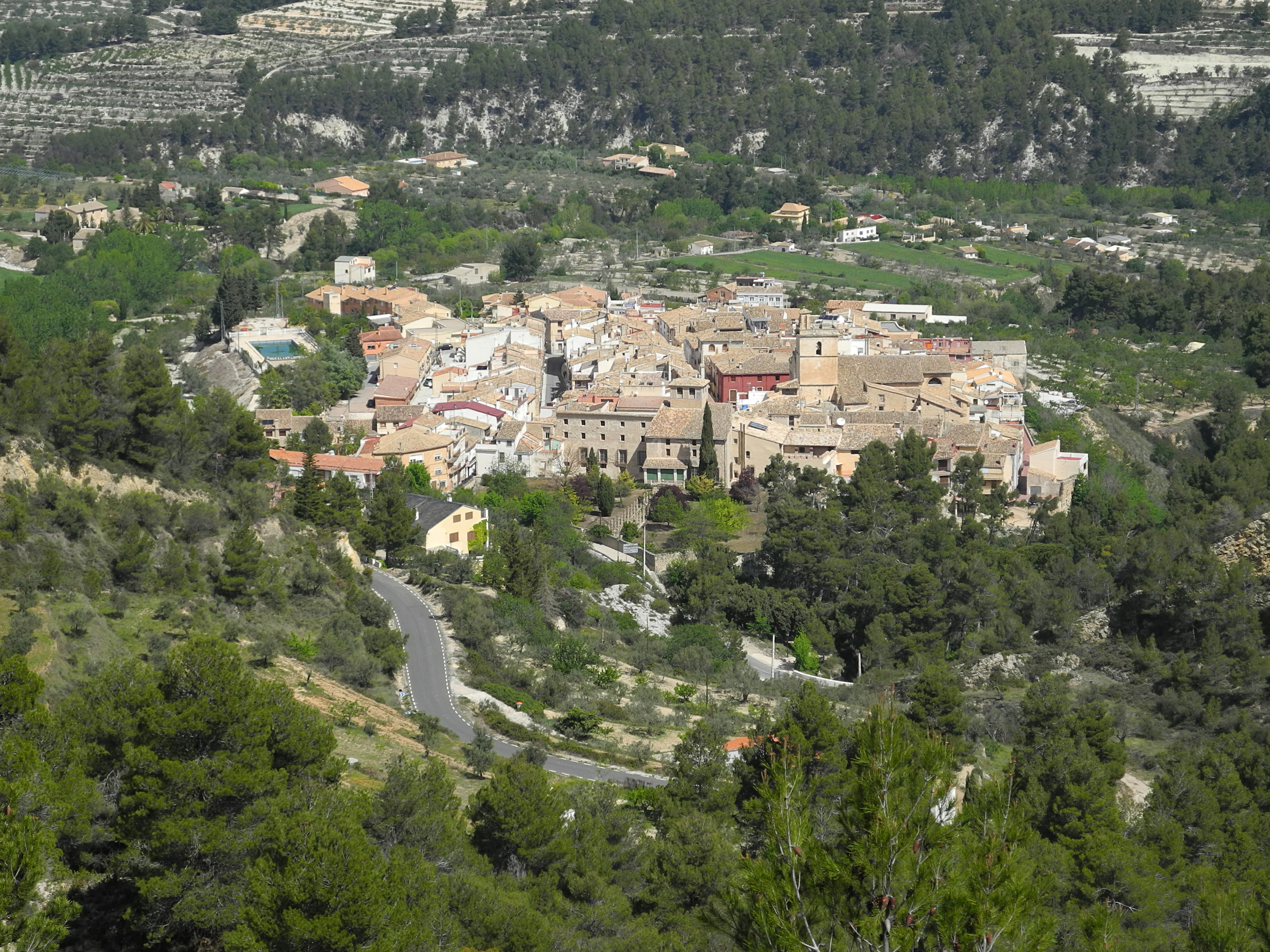

- Flag Coat of arms

- Location within the Valencian Community
- Coordinates: 38°40′59″N 0°19′59″W
- Country: Spain
- Autonomous community: Valencian Community
- Province: Alacant / Alicante
- Comarca: Comtat
- Judicial district: Alcoi / Alcoy

Government
  - Alcalde: Francisco Miguel Fenollar Iváñez (2007) (PSOE)

Area
  - Total: 14.56 km^{2} (5.62 sq mi)
- Elevation: 739 m (2,425 ft)

Population (2025-01-01)
  - Total: 184
  - Density: 12.6/km^{2} (32.7/sq mi)
- Demonyms: • alcolejà, -ana (Val.) • alcolechano, -a (Sp.)
- Time zone: UTC+1 (CET)
  - Summer (DST): UTC+2 (CEST)
- Postal code: 03814
- Official language(s): Valencian and Spanish

Alcoleja (Valencian: [alkoˈledʒa]; Spanish: Alcolecha [alkoˈletʃa]) is a municipality in the comarca of Comtat in the Valencian Community, Spain.
