= Almudaina =

- Municipality
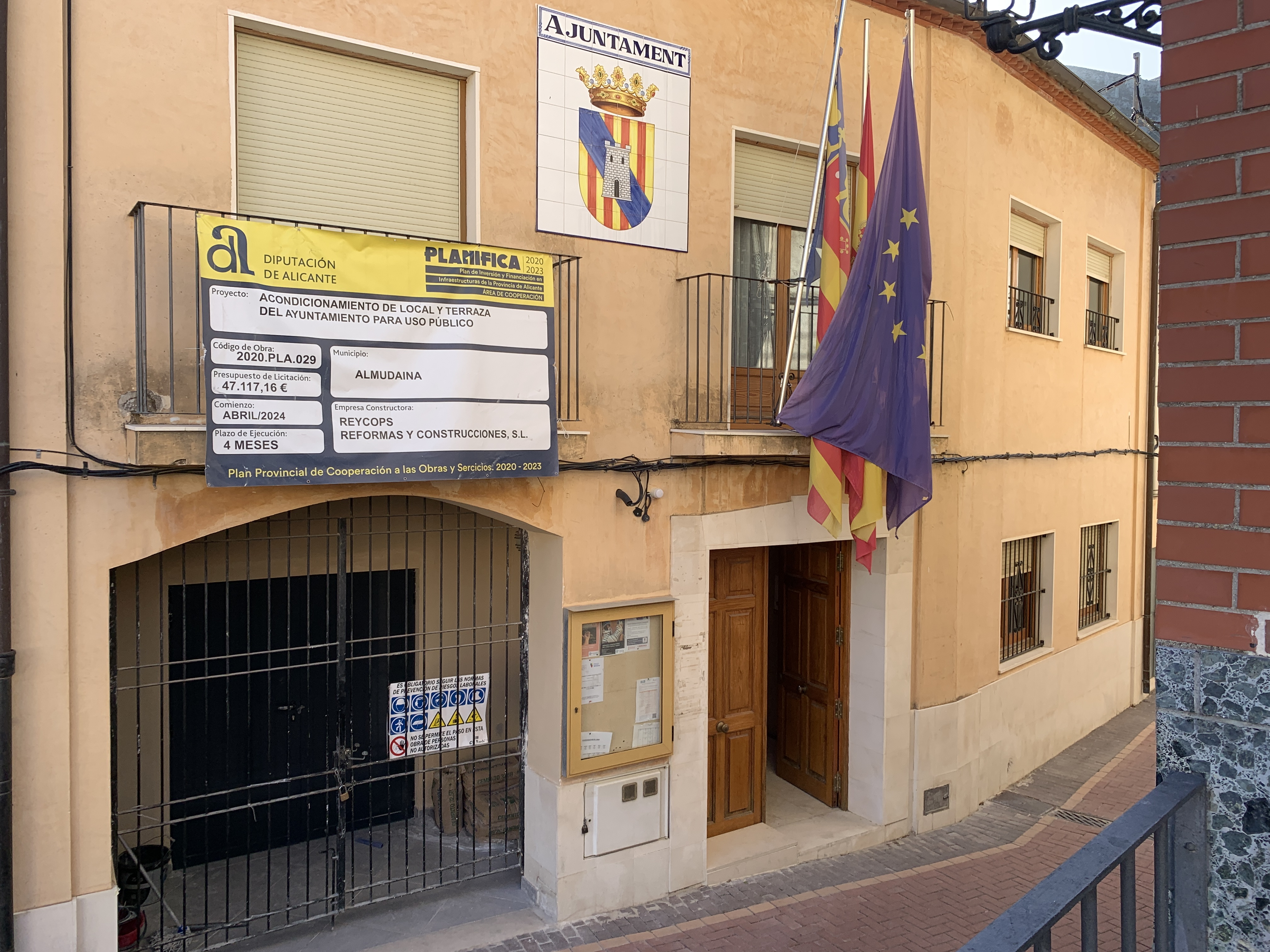
- Town hall scut d'Almudaina.svg

- Location within the Valencian Community
- Coordinates: 38°45′40″N 0°21′16″W
- Country: Spain
- Autonomous community: Valencian Community
- Province: Alicante
- Comarca: Comtat
- Judicial district: Alcoy

Government
  - Alcalde: José Luis Seguí Andrés (PP)

Area
  - Total: 8.82 km^{2} (3.41 sq mi)
- Elevation: 586 m (1,923 ft)

Population (2025-01-01)
  - Total: 128
  - Density: 14.5/km^{2} (37.6/sq mi)
- Demonyms: Almudainero, -a
- Time zone: UTC+01:00 (CET)
  - Summer (DST): UTC+02:00 (CEST)
- Postal code: 03827
- Official language(s): Valencian

Almudaina (Valencian: [almuˈðajna]; Spanish: [almuˈðajna]) is a municipality in the comarca of Comtat in the Valencian Community, Spain.
