= Comtat =

Coordinates: 38°46′1″N 0°22′30″W

Comtat Condado de Cocentaina
- Comarca
- Country: Spain
- Autonomous community: Valencian Community
- Province: Alacant / Alicante
- Capital and largest city: Cocentaina
- Municipalities: 24 municipalities: Agres, Alcosser de Planes, Alcoleja, Alfafara, Almudaina, L'Alqueria d'Asnar, Balones, Benasau, Beniarrés, Benilloba, Benillup, Benimarfull, Benimassot, Cocentaina, Fageca, Famorca, Gaianes, Gorga, Millena, Muro d'Alcoi, L'Orxa/Lorcha, Planes, Quatretondeta, Tollos

Area
  - Total: 376.4 km^{2} (145.3 sq mi)

Population (2019)
  - Total: 28,096
  - Density: 74.64/km^{2} (193.3/sq mi)
- Time zone: UTC+1 (CET)
  - Summer (DST): UTC+2 (CEST)

Comtat (Valencian: [komˈtat]; Spanish: Condado de Cocentaina [konˈdaðo ðe koθenˈtajna]) is a comarca in the province of Alicante, Valencian Community, Spain.

== Municipalities ==
The comarca is composed of 24 municipalities, listed below with their areas and populations:

Name	Area in km^{2}	Population (2001)	Population (2011)	Population (2019)
Agres	25.8	635	576	565
Alcoleja	14.6	251	193	173
Alcosser de Planes	4.7	153	222	230
Alfafara	19.8	418	416	410
Almudaina	8.8	109	119	113
L'Alqueria d'Asnar	0.7	417	517	493
Balones	11.2	185	147	131
Benasau	9.0	221	172	151
Beniarrés	20.2	1,375	1,249	1,118
Benilloba	9.5	903	790	724
Benillup	3.4	97	109	97
Benimarfull	5.6	420	405	409
Benimassot	9.5	147	124	106
Cocentaina	52.8	10,617	11,424	11,511
Fageca	10.2	115	100	106
Famorca	9.6	73	56	47
Gaianes	9.6	319	435	452
Gorga	9.1	269	255	249
Millena	9.8	178	208	237
Muro de Alcoy / Muro d'Alcoi	30.5	7,514	8,993	9,324
Lorcha/L'Orxa	31.8	737	717	578
Planes	38.9	787	814	693
Quatretondeta	16.7	166	110	122
Tollos	14.6	41	44	57
Totals	376.4	26,147	28,195	28,096

Municipalities of Comtat

== See also ==
- Geography of Spain
- List of Spanish cities
