= Fageca =

- Municipality
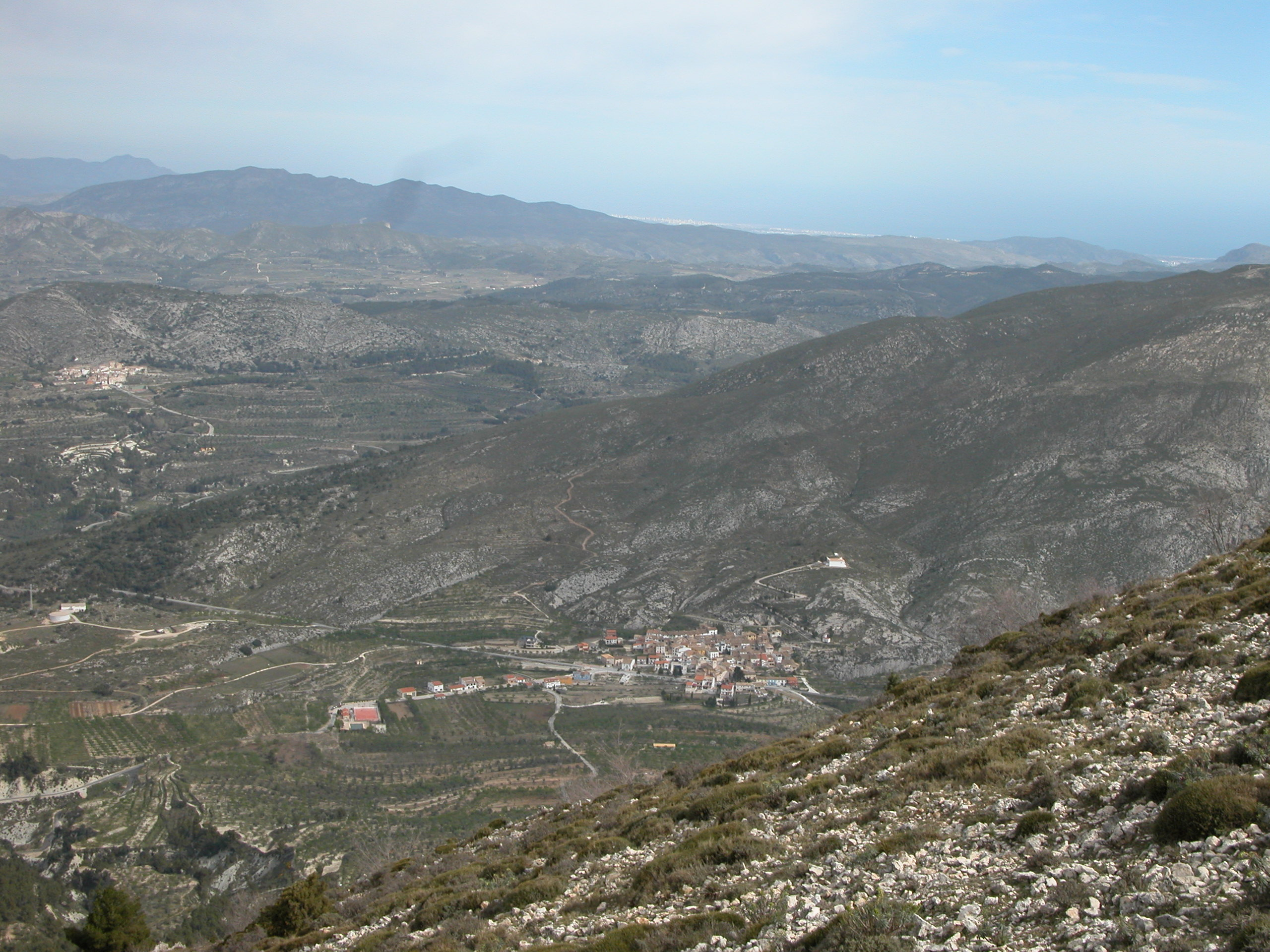
- View of Fageca.

- Coat of arms

- Location of Fageca. Fageca (Valencian Community)
- Coordinates: 38°44′N 0°16′W
- Country: Spain
- Community: Valencian Community
- Province: Alicante
- Comarca: Comtat

Government
  - Mayor: Ismael Vidal Soneira (PSOE)

Area
  - Total: 10.17 km^{2} (3.93 sq mi)

Population (2023)
  - Total: 101
  - Density: 9.93/km^{2} (25.7/sq mi)
- Time zone: UTC+1 (CET)
  - Summer (DST): UTC+2 (CEST)
- Postal code: 03813
- Website: www.fageca.es

Fageca (Valencian pronunciation: [faˈdʒeka], Spanish: Facheca [faˈtʃeka]) is a municipality in the comarca of Comtat, Alicante, Valencia, Spain.
