= Àlex Pascual =

Spanish footballer

Personal information
- Full name: Alejandro Pascual Julià
- Date of birth: 21 May 1977 (age 49)
- Place of birth: Muro de Alcoy, Spain
- Height: 1.75 m (5 ft 9 in)
- Positions: Midfielder; winger

Team information
- Current team: Eldense

Youth career
- Muro
- Alcoyano

Senior career*
Years	Team	Apps	(Gls)
1994–1995	Alcoyano		
1995–1997	Ontinyent	41	(9)
1998–1999	Hércules	43	(5)
1999–2000	Valencia B	23	(0)
2000–2001	Novelda	8	(0)
2001–2006	Ontinyent		
2006–2008	Olímpic Xàtiva		
2008	Muro		
2008–2009	Benigànim		
2009–2012	Muro		
2012–	Eldense		
- * Club domestic league appearances and goals

Alejandro "Àlex" Pascual Julià (born 21 May 1977) is a Spanish footballer who plays for CD Eldense in Tercera División, as an attacking midfielder or right winger.

== Football career ==
Born in Muro de Alcoy, Province of Alicante, Pascual spent his entire career in the Valencian Community, starting with CD Alcoyano and Ontinyent CF, playing three of four seasons in Segunda División B. In the 1998 winter transfer window, he joined Hércules CF in Segunda División, appearing in 20 games in his first year and being relegated in his second.

From there onwards, Pascual resumed his career in the lower leagues, notably spending six seasons with former club Ontinyent in Tercera División. In the 2009 summer, aged 32, he signed for a second spell with local Muro Club de Fútbol, also in that level.

In late December 2012 Pascual signed for CD Eldense, still in the fourth category.
