= L'Orxa / Lorcha =

Municipality in Alicante, Spain

L'Orxa Lorcha
- Municipality
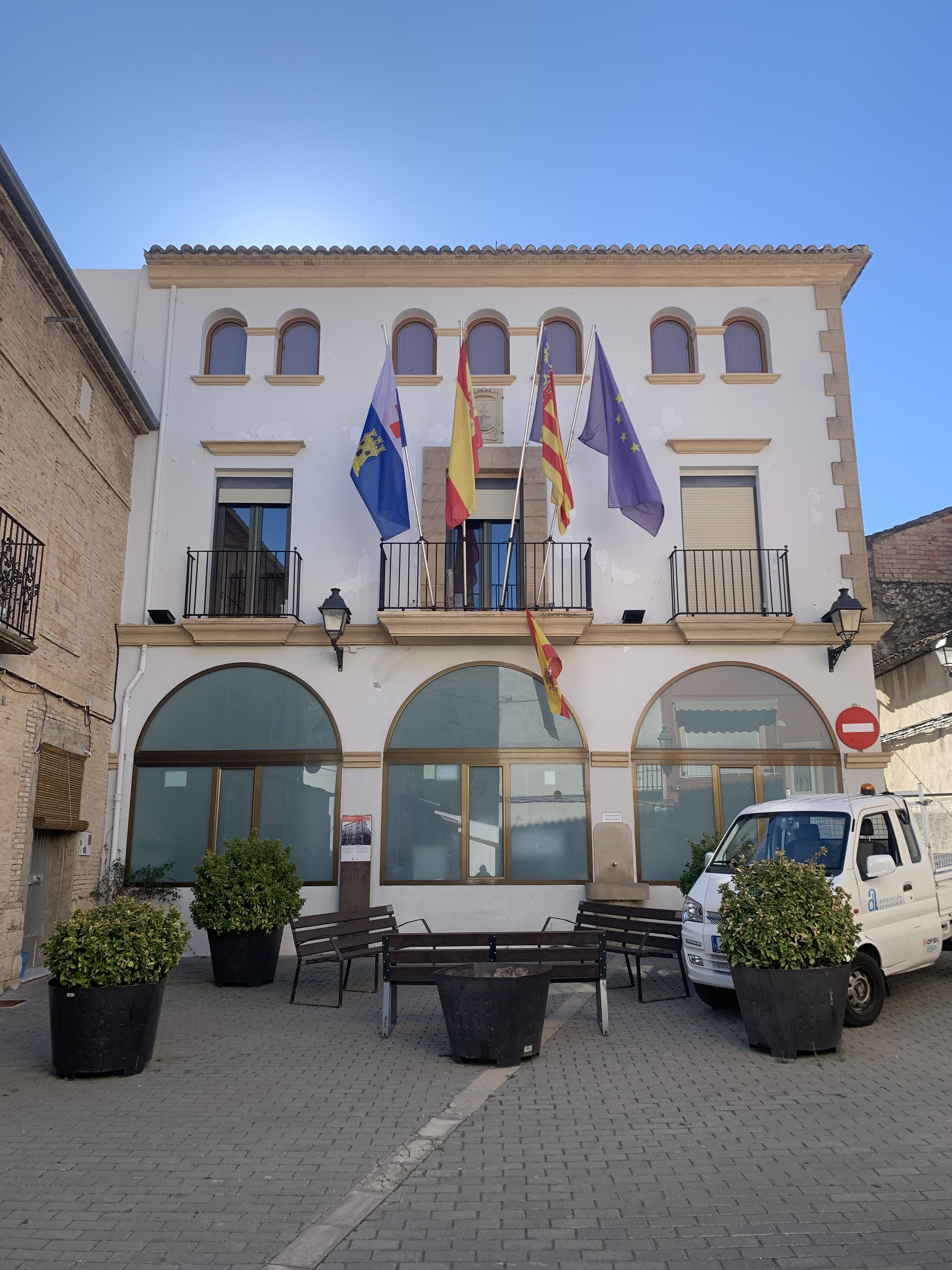
- Town hall of L'Orxa

- Flag Coat of arms

- Location within Province of Alicante Location within Valencian Community Location within Spain
- Coordinates: 38°50′37″N 00°18′43″W
- Country: Spain
- Autonomous community: Valencia
- Province: Alicante
- Comarca: Comtat
- Judicial district: Alcoy

Government
  - Alcalde: Arnaldo Dueñas Crespo (2015)

Area
  - Total: 31.80 km^{2} (12.28 sq mi)
- Elevation: 467 m (1,532 ft)

Population (2021)
  - Total: 581
  - Density: 18.3/km^{2} (47.3/sq mi)
- Demonym(s): orxà, -ana (Val.) lorchano, -a (Sp.)
- Time zone: UTC+1 (CET)
  - Summer (DST): UTC+2 (CEST)
- Postal code: 03860
- Dialing code: 960-963
- Official language(s): Valencian; Spanish

L'Orxa (Valencian: [ˈloɾtʃa]), or Lorcha (Spanish: [ˈloɾtʃa]), is a municipality is a municipality in the comarca of Comtat in the Valencian Community, Spain. As of the year 2021, it has a total population of 581.

== History ==
The settlement first appeared as Alquenènsia in a 1379 census. Following the Expulsion of the Moriscos in 1609, it was repopulated by migrants from Mallorca.

== Geography ==
Lorcha is located along the northern edge of Alicante, to the east of Serpis River. Highway CV-701 passes through the northeastern portion of the municipality. Its average elevation is 467 meters above the sea level.

== Climate ==
L'Orxa has a Hot-summer Mediterranean Climate (Csa). It sees the least precipitation in July, with an average rainfall of 10 mm; and the most precipitation in September, with an average rainfall of 82 mm.

Climate data for Lorcha
Month	Jan	Feb	Mar	Apr	May	Jun	Jul	Aug	Sep	Oct	Nov	Dec	Year
Mean daily maximum °C (°F)	12.7 (54.9)	13.2 (55.8)	16.1 (61.0)	18.4 (65.1)	21.9 (71.4)	27.0 (80.6)	29.9 (85.8)	29.5 (85.1)	25.2 (77.4)	21.4 (70.5)	15.7 (60.3)	13.1 (55.6)	20.3 (68.6)
Daily mean °C (°F)	8.0 (46.4)	8.5 (47.3)	11.1 (52.0)	13.6 (56.5)	17.1 (62.8)	21.8 (71.2)	24.7 (76.5)	24.4 (75.9)	20.7 (69.3)	17.0 (62.6)	11.4 (52.5)	8.7 (47.7)	15.6 (60.1)
Mean daily minimum °C (°F)	4.1 (39.4)	4.3 (39.7)	6.6 (43.9)	8.9 (48.0)	12.0 (53.6)	16.4 (61.5)	19.5 (67.1)	19.8 (67.6)	16.7 (62.1)	13.2 (55.8)	7.9 (46.2)	5.1 (41.2)	11.2 (52.2)
Average rainfall mm (inches)	52 (2.0)	44 (1.7)	52 (2.0)	62 (2.4)	48 (1.9)	22 (0.9)	10 (0.4)	27 (1.1)	82 (3.2)	77 (3.0)	64 (2.5)	58 (2.3)	598 (23.4)
Source: Climate-Data.org
