= Tollos =

- Municipality
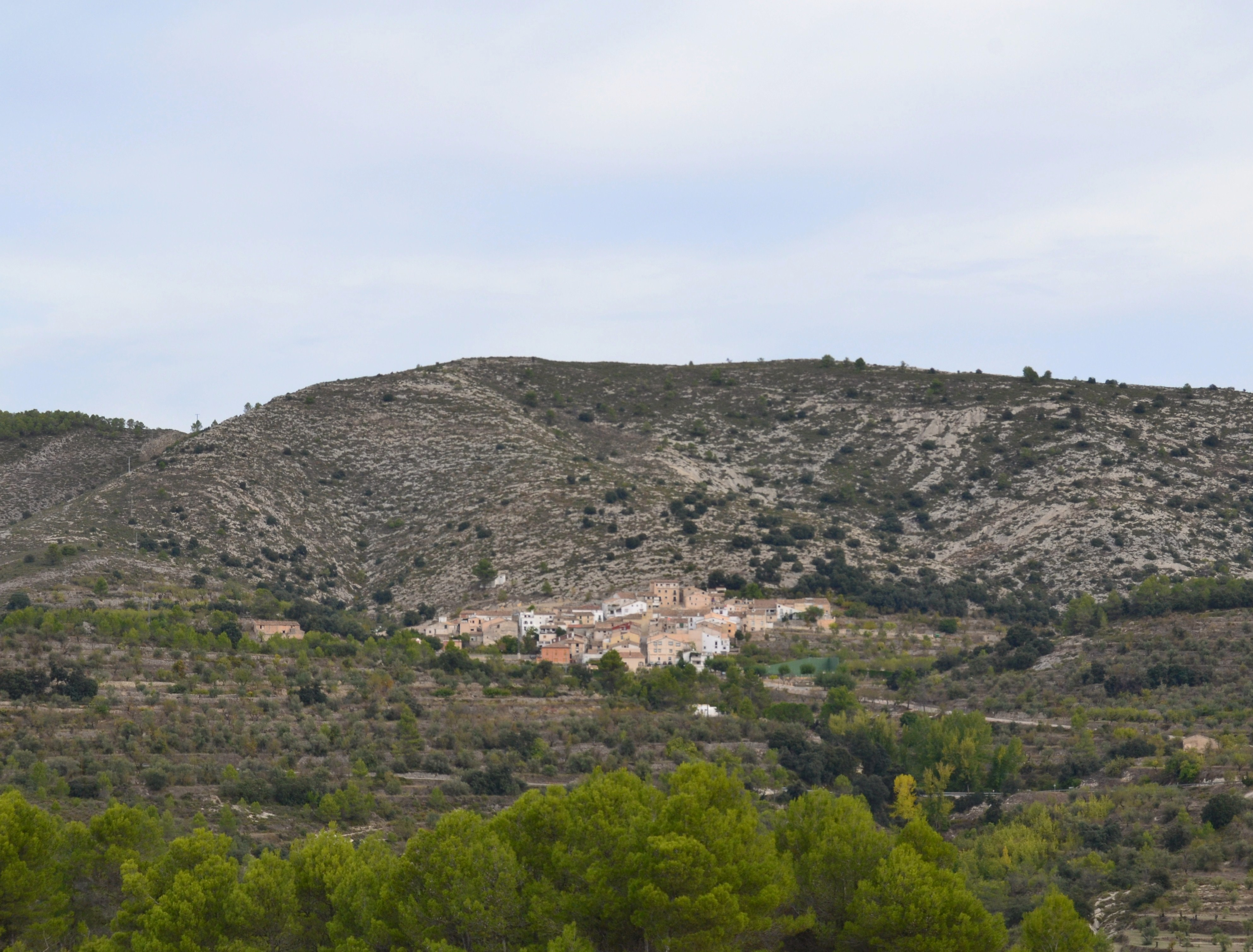
- General view of Tollos.

- Coat of arms

- Location of Tollos. Tollos (Valencian Community)
- Coordinates: 38°45′N 0°16′W
- Country: Spain
- Community: Valencian Community
- Province: Alicante
- Comarca: Condado de Cocentaina

Government
  - Mayor: Félix Frau Seguí (PP)

Area
  - Total: 15.97 km^{2} (6.17 sq mi)

Population (2023)
  - Total: 40
  - Density: 2.5/km^{2} (6.5/sq mi)
- Time zone: UTC+1 (CET)
  - Summer (DST): UTC+2 (CEST)
- Postal code: 03813
- Website: www.tollos.es

Tollos (Valencian and Spanish: [ˈtoʎos]) is a municipality in the comarca of Comtat, Alicante, Valencia, Spain.

The small village of Tollos is in the El Comtat region of the Province of Alicante in the Comunidad de Valencia. It stands at 780 metres above sea level. Its climate is typically Mediterranean with about 300 days of sunshine. Spring and Autumn are said to be very pleasant; Summer can see average temperatures of 34 °C whilst the winters have days of about 15 °C with night time dropping to 6 or 7 °C.

There are about 54 homes in the village but only about 12 permanent inhabitants. During the COVID pandemic this number has risen to about 24. The village has no shop but supplies by baker, butcher and grocer come regularly throughout the week. A doctor makes two weekly visits (Monday and Thursday), no appointment necessary, the farmacia also opens on those days.

The summer months sees an influx of families to enjoy life at the mountain pace; the village pool also opens at this time along with the pool bar.

Much of the surrounding areas were repopulated by people from Majorca after the expulsion of the Moors in 1492. The home language of the region is Valenciano but Spanish is also used.

The common crops grown are almonds and olives along with cherries in neighbouring valleys. However with an ageing population many of the fields are left unworked.
