= Famorca =

- Municipality
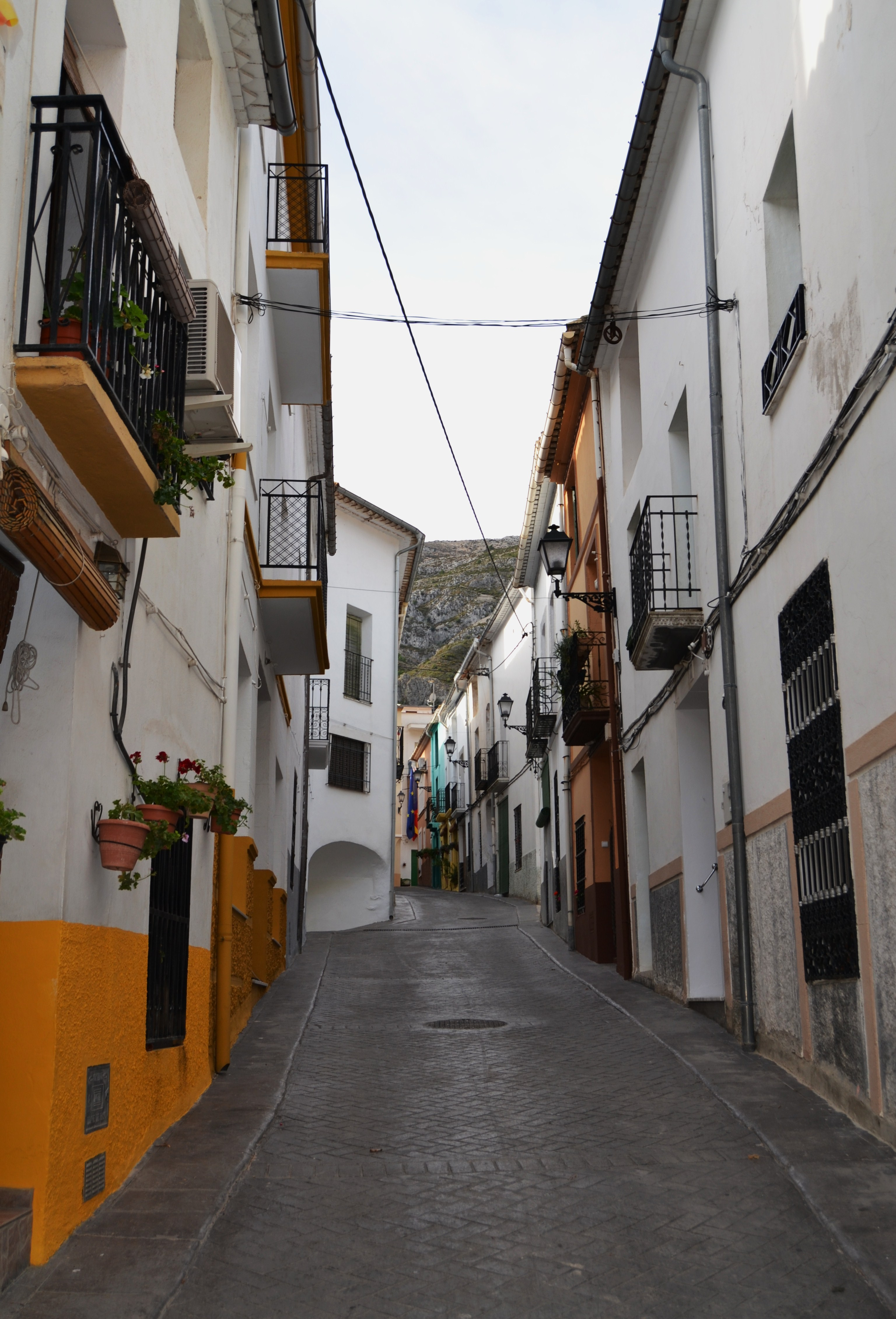
- Street of Famorca.

- Coat of arms

- Location of Famorca. Famorca (Valencian Community)
- Coordinates: 38°44′N 0°15′W
- Country: Spain
- Community: Valencia
- Province: Alicante
- Comarca: Comtat

Government
  - Mayor: José Vicente Masanet Ferrer (PP)

Area
  - Total: 9.72 km^{2} (3.75 sq mi)

Population (2023)
  - Total: 45
  - Density: 4.6/km^{2} (12/sq mi)
- Time zone: UTC+1 (CET)
  - Summer (DST): UTC+2 (CEST)
- Postal code: 03813
- Website: www.famorca.es

Famorca (Valencian: [faˈmoɾka], Spanish: [faˈmoɾka]) is a municipality in the comarca of Comtat, Alicante, Valencia, Spain.
