= L'Alqueria d'Asnar =

- Municipality
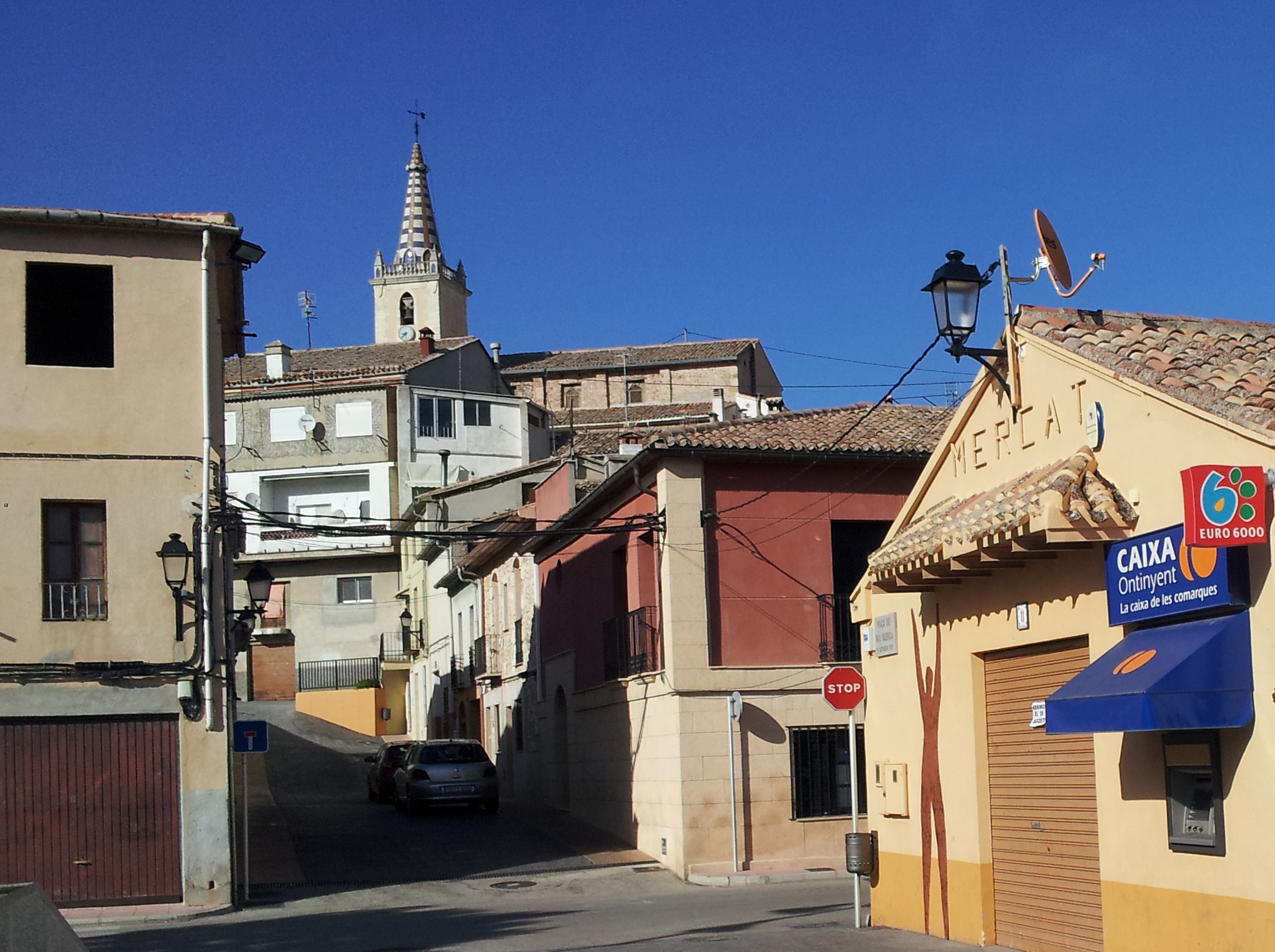
- L'Alqueria d'Asnar

- Flag Coat of arms

- Location within the Valencian Community L'Alqueria d'Asnar (Spain)
- Coordinates: 38°46′22″N 0°25′33″W
- Country: Spain
- Autonomous community: Valencian Community
- Province: Alicante
- Comarca: Comtat
- Judicial district: Alcoy

Government
  - Alcalde: Francesc Jaume Pascual Pascual (PSPV-PSOE)

Area
  - Total: 1.08 km^{2} (0.42 sq mi)
- Elevation: 394 m (1,293 ft)

Population (2025-01-01)
  - Total: 519
  - Density: 481/km^{2} (1,240/sq mi)
- Demonym(s): Alquerier, alquerirera
- Time zone: UTC+1 (CET)
  - Summer (DST): UTC+2 (CEST)
- Postal code: 03829
- Official language(s): Valencian

L'Alqueria d'Asnar (Valencian pronunciation: [lalkeˈɾi.a ðazˈnaɾ]; Spanish: Alquería de Aznar [alkeˈɾi.a ðe aðˈnaɾ]) is a municipality in the comarca of Comtat in the Valencian Community, Spain.
