= Balones =

- Municipality
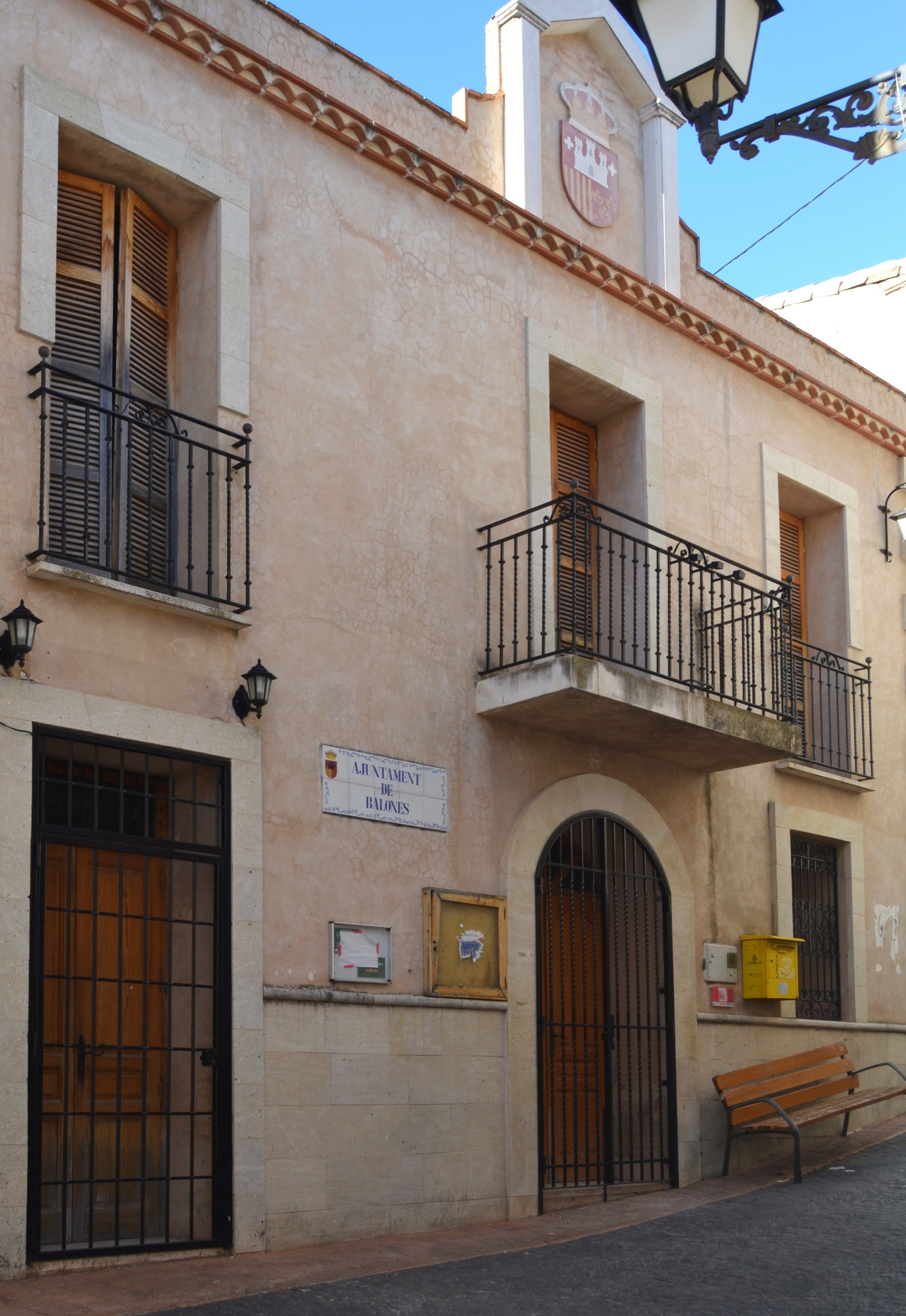
- Town hall

- Coat of arms

- Location within the Valencian Community
- Coordinates: 38°44′12″N 0°20′35″W
- Country: Spain
- Autonomous community: Valencian Community
- Province: Alicante
- Comarca: Comtat
- Judicial district: Alcoi

Government
  - Alcalde: Juan Ramón Nadal Doménech (PP)

Area
  - Total: 11.20 km^{2} (4.32 sq mi)
- Elevation: 660 m (2,170 ft)

Population (2025-01-01)
  - Total: 132
  - Density: 11.8/km^{2} (30.5/sq mi)
- Demonym: Baloner(a)
- Time zone: UTC+1 (CET)
  - Summer (DST): UTC+2 (CEST)
- Postal code: 03812
- Official language(s): Valencian

Balones (Valencian and Spanish: [baˈlones]) is a municipality in the comarca of Comtat in the Valencian Community, Spain.
