= Benimarfull =

- Municipality
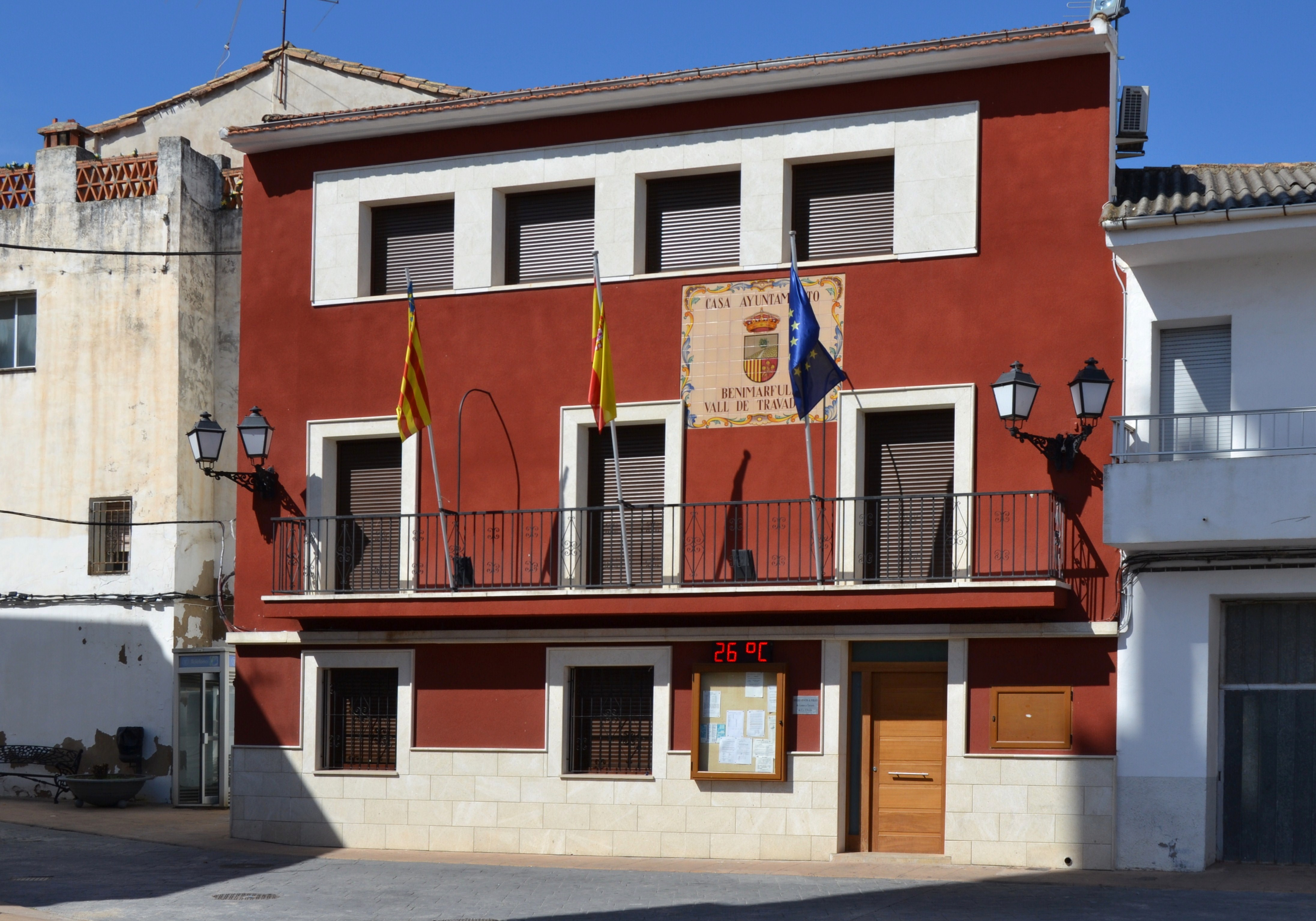
- The city Council of Benimarfull

- Coat of arms

- Location within the Valencian Community
- Coordinates: 38°46′59″N 0°22′59″W
- Country: Spain
- Autonomous community: Valencian Community
- Province: Alicante
- Comarca: Comtat
- Judicial district: Alcoy

Government
  - Alcalde: Maria Rosario Recio Vilaplana (2005) (PP)

Area
  - Total: 5.6 km^{2} (2.2 sq mi)
- Elevation: 416 m (1,365 ft)

Population (2025-01-01)
  - Total: 465
  - Density: 83/km^{2} (220/sq mi)
- Demonym(s): Benimarfuller, benimarfullera
- Time zone: UTC+1 (CET)
  - Summer (DST): UTC+2 (CEST)
- Postal code: 03827
- Official language(s): Valencian

Benimarfull (Valencian: [benimaɾˈfuʎ], Spanish: [benimaɾˈful]) is a municipality in the comarca of Comtat in the Valencian Community, Spain, just 14.5 kilometers (9 miles) from the town of Alcoy.

Benimarfull is one of 14 municipalities in the Association of Municipalities of Alcoy, which supports the area through economic, cultural and educational initiatives.

== Geography ==
It is located on the CV-700 roadway that runs between Alfafara, Pego, and Vergel, crossing the entire Gallinera Valley, the valley of cherries. The town is crossed by the Sofre, Benimarfull, and Albacar ravines, and all tributaries of the Serpis river. Its municipal area borders with those of Alcocer de Planes, Almudaina, Benillup, Cocentaina, Muro de Alcoy and Planes.

== History ==
The name Benimarfull, of Arabic origin, means "son of the bitter fountain." In the mid-13th century, the place was conquered from the Muslims by James I of Aragon and incorporated into the Kingdom of Valencia. From the mid-15th century, it became part of the lordship of Guadalest. In 1574, the Patriarch Juan de Ribera ordered the creation of the Morisco restoration of Benimarfull-Benillup, the document of creation in which contains the first appearance of the name "Benimarfull."

== Demographics ==
The population has decreased since the beginning of the 20th century, with 414 inhabitants in the INE 2010 census .

Demographic evolution
1900	1910	1920	1930	1940	1950	1960	1970	1981	1991	2000	2005	2010	2020
780	797	753	767	739	719	573	532	410	379	410	441	414	396

== Economy ==
The economy, mainly agricultural, is based on dry farming and is known for being the origins of the cherry for the "Montaña de Alicante," and olives for the "Aceite virgen de oliva Mariola.". It is also a notable producer of aromatic plants, spices, infusions, and teas from organic farming called Herbes del Molí, which is marketed under the Artemís brand.

It is also the municipality in Alicante with the highest per capita income, with an average net income per person of 23,205 euros in 2020 according to data from the INE.

== Monuments ==
- Church of Santa Ana . White and earthy construction, with a slender bell tower with three bodies and built in the 16th century .
- Fuente de Santa Ana Spa. Building of architectural interest. In 1847, taking advantage of a sulphurous water spring, the Fuente de Santa Ana spa was inaugurated, which would be in operation until 1936 .

== Events ==
The religious festivities are held in the second half of July dedicated to Saint James, Saint Anne, and the Holy Christ. In the first weekend of August, the popular festivities are celebrated with a solemn procession, entrances and parades of Moors and Christians, popular dances, theater shows, etc.

== Satellite Image ==
- Benimarfull: . Source: WikiMapia
