= Serra Mariola Natural Park =

Nature reserve in mountains in the Valencian Community, Spain

- Parc Natural de la Serra de Mariola (Valencian); Parque Natural de la Sierra de Mariola (Spanish)
- IUCN category IV (habitat/species management area)
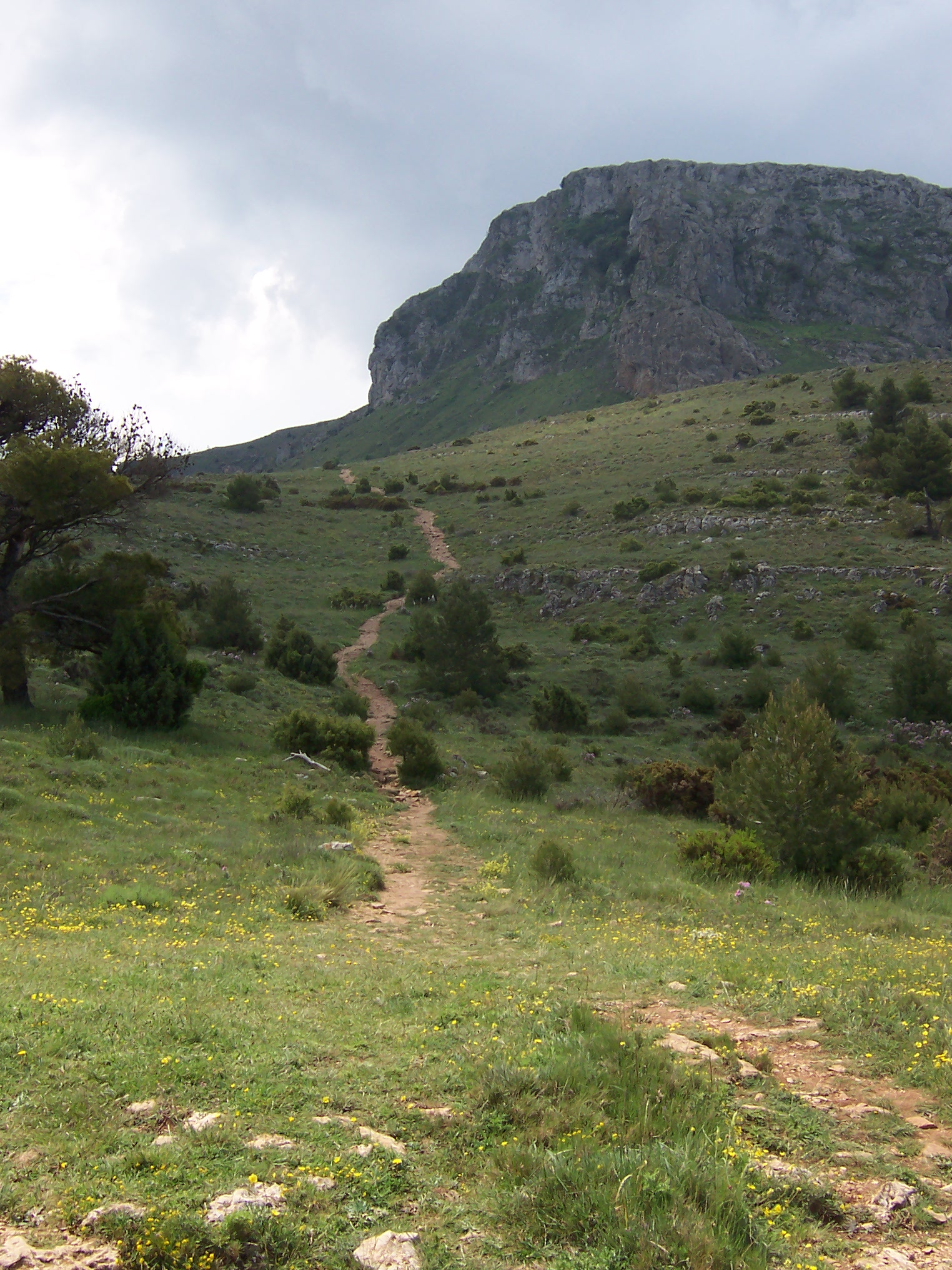
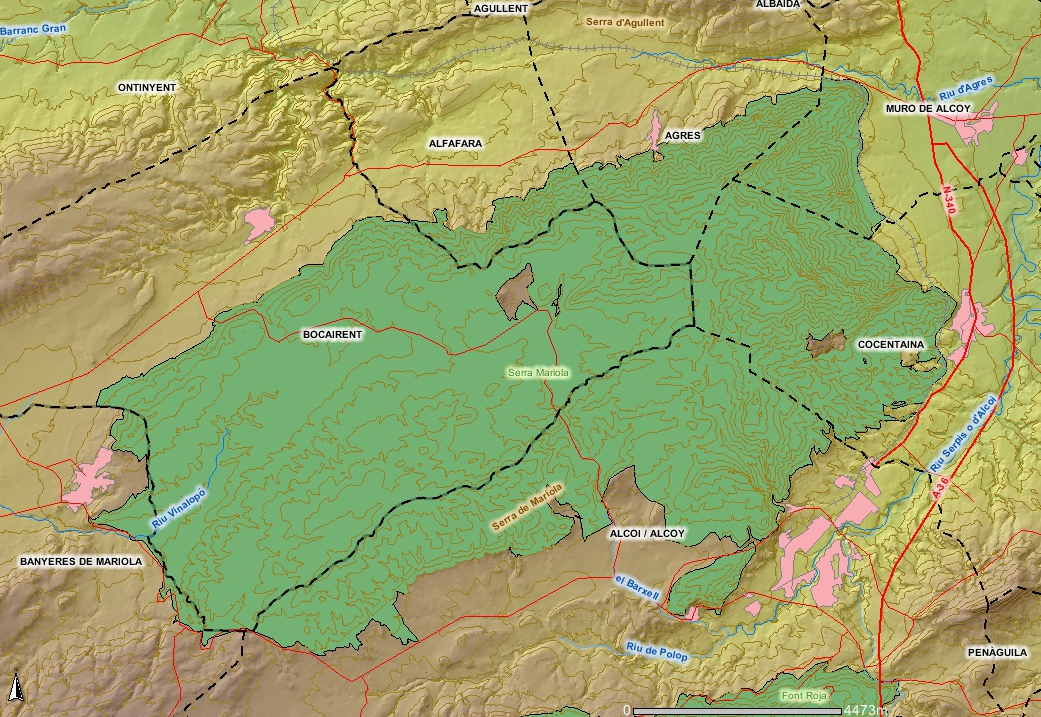
- Path to the Montcabrer Map of the Serra Mariola Natural Park
- Interactive map of Serra Mariola Natural Park
- Location: Alcoy, Valencian Community, Spain
- Nearest city: Valencian Community: Alcoy, Cocentaina, Muro de Alcoy, Agres, Alfafara, Bocairent and Banyeres de Mariola.
- Coordinates: 38°44′1″N 0°35′30″W
- Area: 17.257 ha (42.64 acres)
- Established: 2002
- Governing body: Generalitat Valenciana

The Serra Mariola Natural Park (Valencian: Parc Natural de la Serra de Mariola, (Note: Valencian: [ˈpaɾɡ natuˈɾal de la ˈsɛra ðe maɾiˈɔla], also [ˈpaɾɡ natuˈɾal de la ˈsɛrɛ ðe maɾiˈɔlɔ].) Spanish: Parque Natural de la Sierra de Mariola (Note: Spanish: [ˈpaɾke natuˈɾal de la ˈsjera ðe maɾˈjola].)) is a mountain range in the Valencian Community, Spain, one of the most peripheral offsprings of the Baetic System. Most of its territory is included in a natural park founded in 2002, covering an area of 17,257 ha. The park is surrounded by the towns of Cocentaina and Bocairent and the cities of Ontinyent and Alcoi.

It has a rectangular shape and altitudes higher than 1,000 metres, the highest peak being the Montcabrer, at 1,389 metres high. To the north the Benicadell Mountain Range has a peak bearing the same name and is 1,104 metres high. The Serra is predominantly composed of limestone. The climate is largely Mediterranean.

Covering these mountain ranges are some 200 or more different aromatic and medicinal plants with hundreds of different trees, which include a variety of yew unique to this area.

== See also ==
- Font Roja Natural Park
