= Benillup =

- Municipality
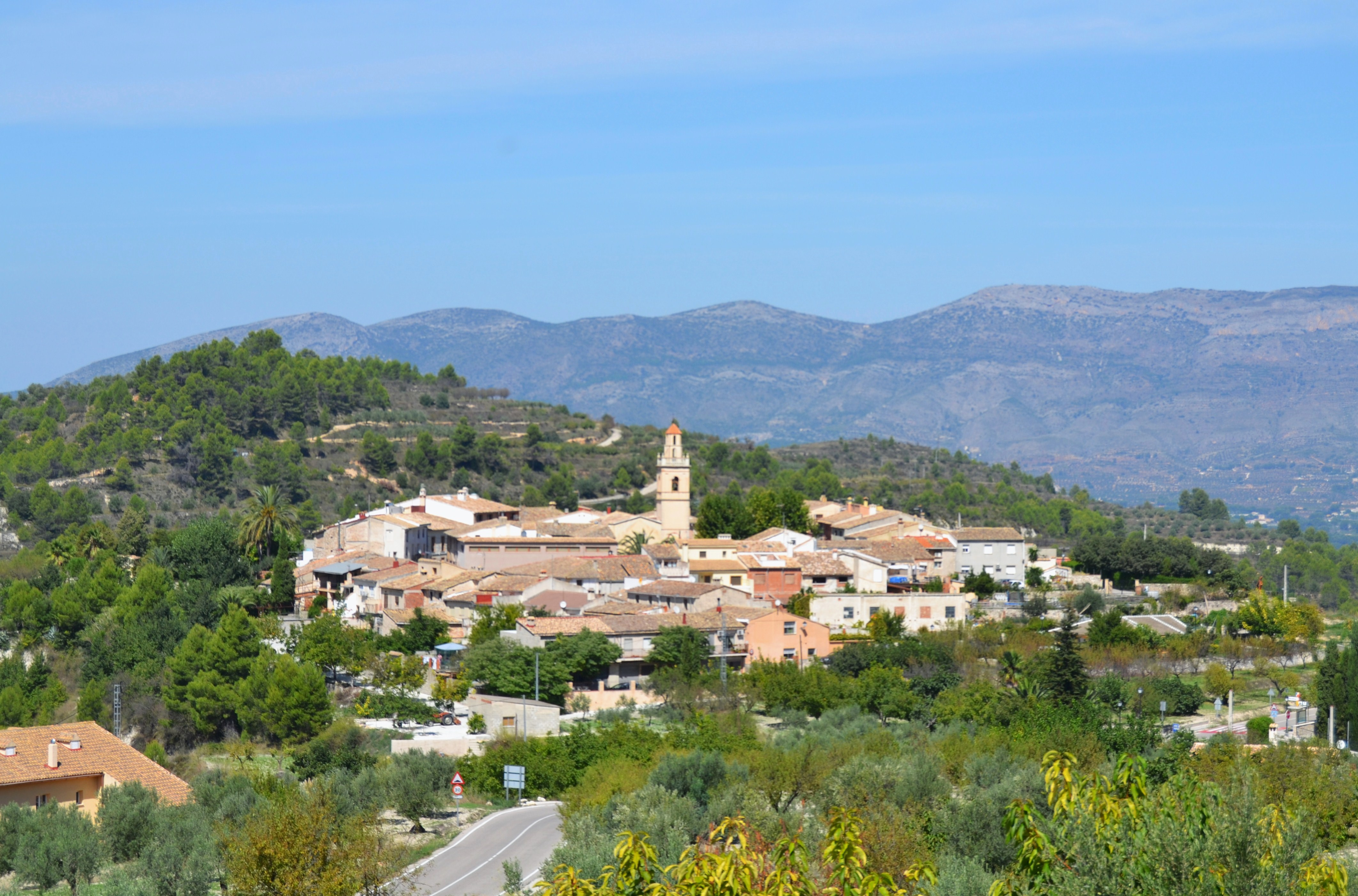
- The view of Benillup

- Coat of arms

- Location within the Valencian Community
- Coordinates: 38°45′12″N 0°22′46″W
- Country: Spain
- Autonomous community: Valencian Community
- Province: Alicante
- Comarca: Comtat
- Judicial district: Alcoi

Government
  - Alcalde: Enrique Coderch Ferrando (2007) (PP)

Area
  - Total: 3.40 km^{2} (1.31 sq mi)
- Elevation: 565 m (1,854 ft)

Population (2025-01-01)
  - Total: 110
  - Density: 32/km^{2} (84/sq mi)
- Demonym(s): Benilluper, benillupera
- Time zone: UTC+1 (CET)
  - Summer (DST): UTC+2 (CEST)
- Postal code: 03827
- Official language(s): Valencian

Benillup (Valencian and Spanish: [beniˈʎup]) is a municipality in the comarca of Comtat in the Valencian Community, Spain.
