= Millena =

- Municipality
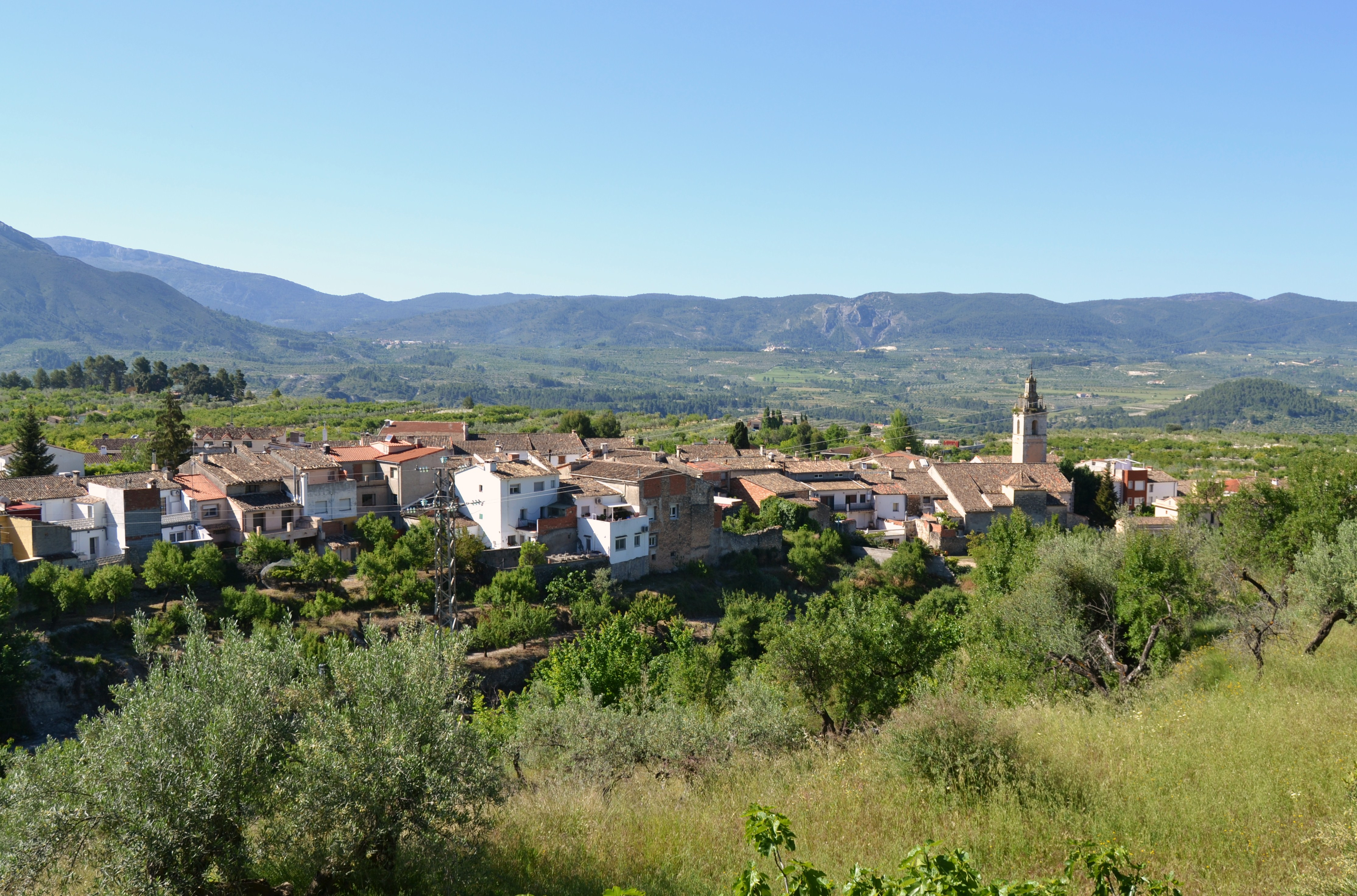
- General view of Millena.

- Coat of arms

- Location of Millena. Millena (Valencian Community)
- Coordinates: 38°44′N 0°21′W
- Country: Spain
- Community: Valencia
- Province: Alicante
- Comarca: Comtat

Government
  - Mayor: César García Bonet (PSOE)

Area
  - Total: 9.77 km^{2} (3.77 sq mi)

Population (2023)
  - Total: 254
  - Density: 26.0/km^{2} (67.3/sq mi)
- Time zone: UTC+1 (CET)
  - Summer (DST): UTC+2 (CEST)
- Postal code: 03812
- Website: www.millena.es

Millena (Valencian and Spanish: [miˈʎena]) is a municipality in the comarca of Comtat, Alicante, Valencia, Spain.
