= Benimassot =

- Municipality
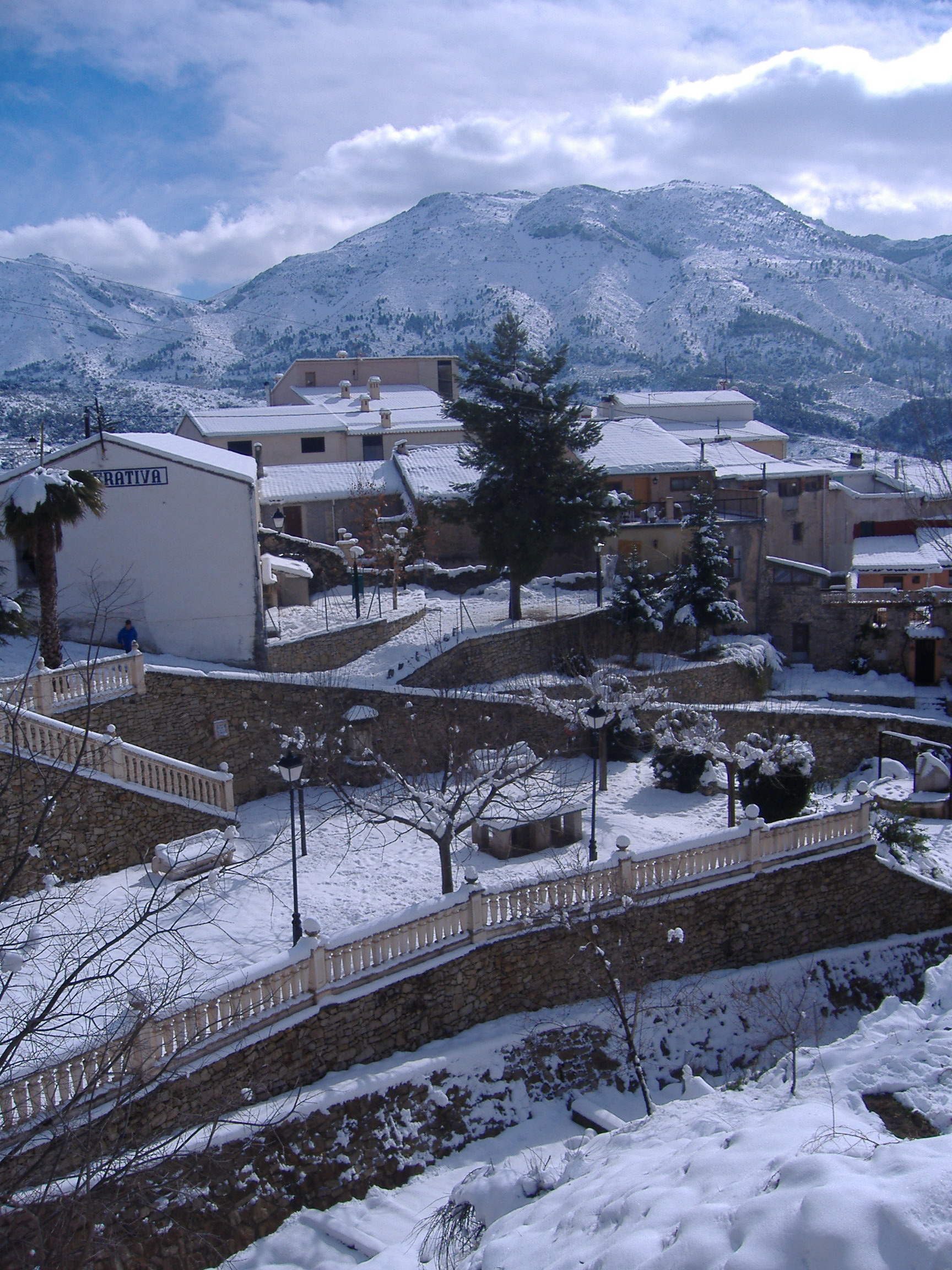
- The view of the snowy town of Benimasot

- Coat of arms

- Location within the Valencian Community
- Coordinates: 38°45′00″N 0°16′59″W
- Country: Spain
- Autonomous community: Valencian Community
- Province: Alicante
- Comarca: Comtat
- Judicial district: Alcoy

Government
  - Alcalde: Rafael Cano Doménech (2005) (PSPV-PSOE)

Area
  - Total: 9.5 km^{2} (3.7 sq mi)
- Elevation: 729 m (2,392 ft)

Population (2025-01-01)
  - Total: 85
  - Density: 8.9/km^{2} (23/sq mi)
- Demonym(s): Benimasotero, -a
- Time zone: UTC+1 (CET)
  - Summer (DST): UTC+2 (CEST)
- Postal code: 03812
- Official language(s): Valencian

Benimassot (Valencian pronunciation: [benimaˈsɔt], Spanish: Benimasot) is a municipality in the comarca of Comtat in the Valencian Community, Spain.
