= Quatretondeta =

Quatretondeta Cuatretondeta
- Municipality
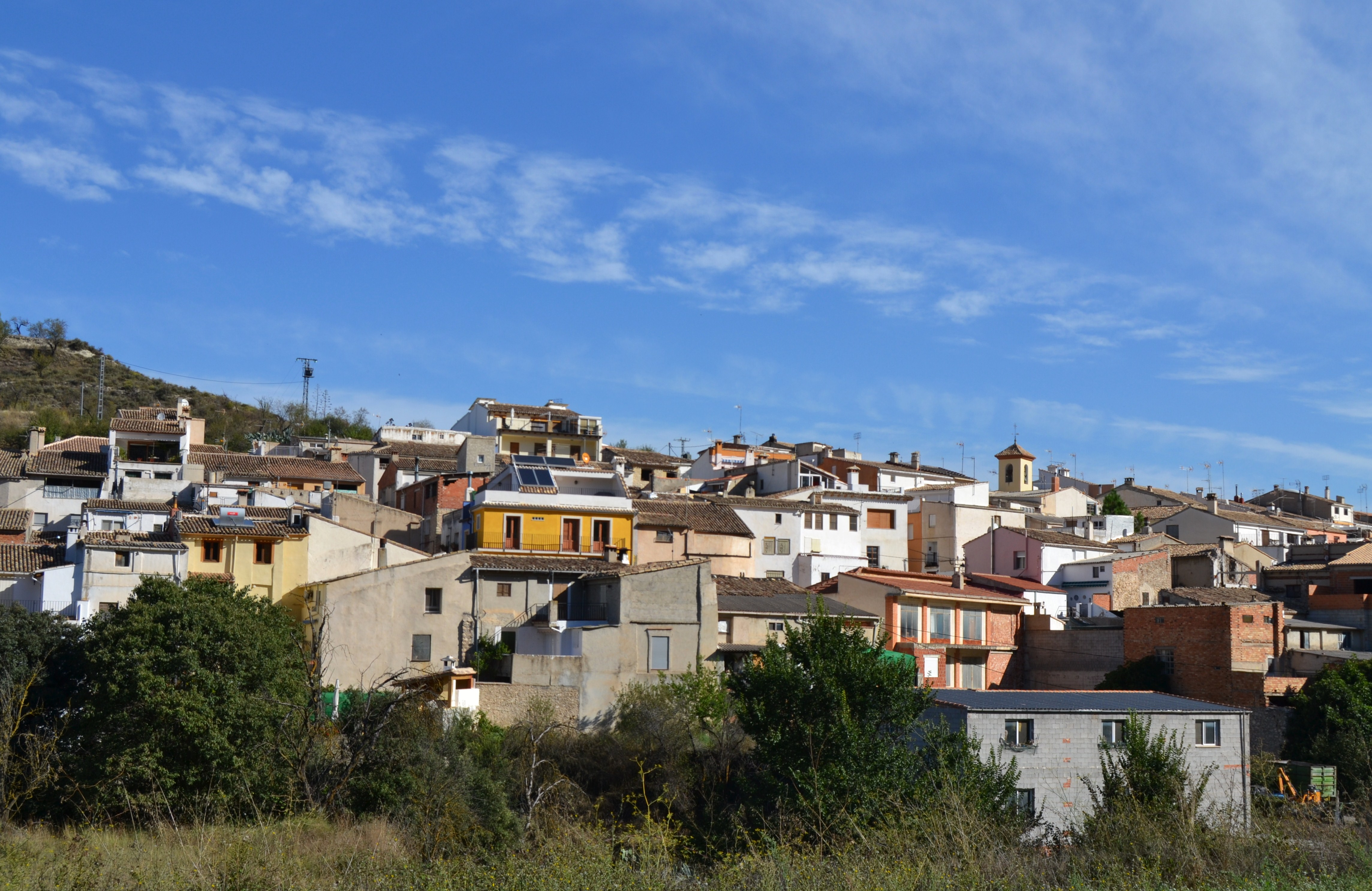
- Quatretondeta, el Comtat

- Coat of arms

- Location within the Valencian Community
- Coordinates: 38°43′25″N 0°19′01″W
- Country: Spain
- Autonomous community: Valencian Community
- Province: Alicante
- Comarca: Comtat
- Judicial district: Cocentaina

Government
  - Mayor: Jorge García Doménech (PSPV-PSOE)

Area
  - Total: 16.70 km^{2} (6.45 sq mi)
- Elevation: 630 m (2,070 ft)

Population (2025-01-01)
  - Total: 130
  - Density: 7.8/km^{2} (20/sq mi)
- Demonym(s): quatretondetí, -ina (Val.)
- Time zone: UTC+1 (CET)
  - Summer (DST): UTC+2 (CEST)
- Postal code: 03811
- Official language(s): Valencian; Spanish
- Website: www.quatretondeta.es

Quatretondeta (Valencian: [ˌkwatɾetonˈdeta]; Spanish: Cuatretondeta [ˌkwatɾetonˈdeta]) is a municipality in the comarca of Comtat, Alicante, Valencian Country, Spain.
