= Benasau =

- Municipality
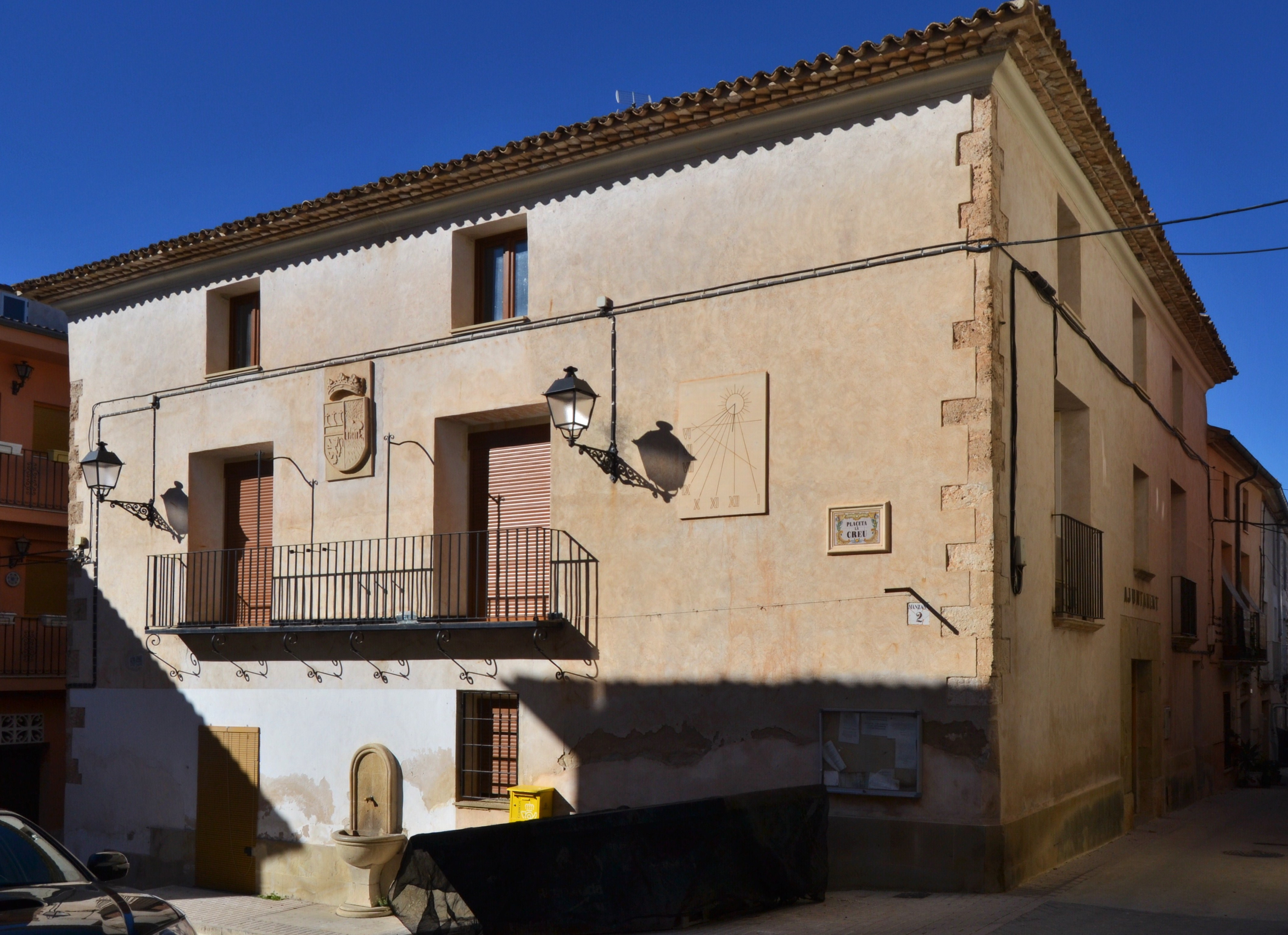
- Town hall

- Coat of arms

- Location within the Valencian Community
- Coordinates: 38°41′23″N 0°20′36″W
- Country: Spain
- Autonomous community: Valencian Community
- Province: Alicante
- Comarca: Comtat
- Judicial district: Alcoi

Government
  - Alcalde: Nieves Mas Gadea (2007) (PSOE)

Area
  - Total: 9.04 km^{2} (3.49 sq mi)
- Elevation: 701 m (2,300 ft)

Population (2025-01-01)
  - Total: 174
  - Density: 19.2/km^{2} (49.9/sq mi)
- Demonym(s): Benasauer, Benasauera
- Time zone: UTC+1 (CET)
  - Summer (DST): UTC+2 (CEST)
- Postal code: 03814
- Official language(s): Valencian
- Website: Official website

Benasau (Valencian: [benaˈzaw]; Spanish: [benaˈsaw]) is a municipality in the comarca of Comtat in the Valencian Community, Spain.
