= Beniarrés =

- Municipality
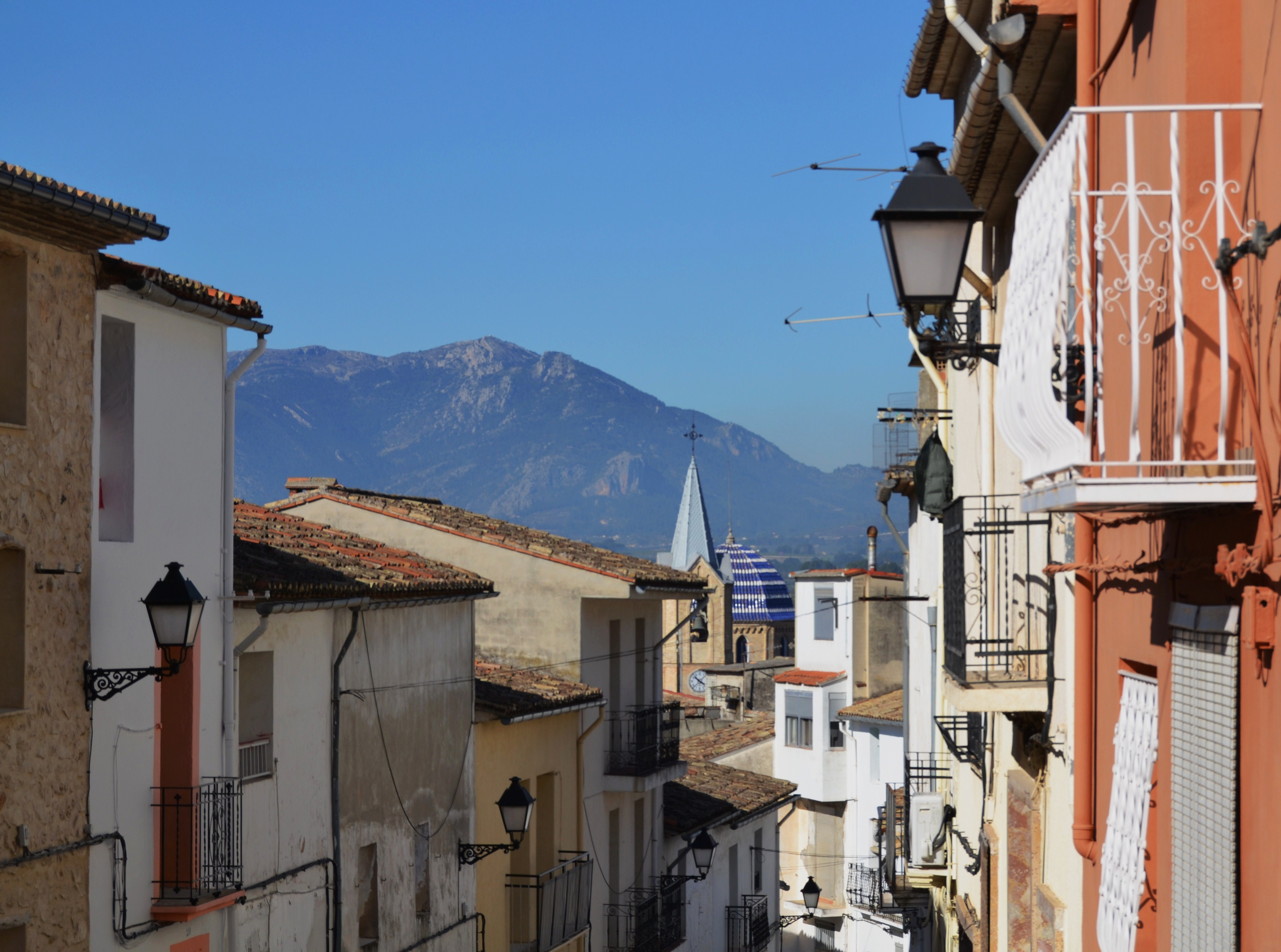

- Coat of arms

- Location within the Valencian Community
- Coordinates: 38°49′12″N 0°22′46″W
- Country: Spain
- Autonomous community: Valencian Community
- Province: Alicante
- Comarca: Comtat
- Judicial district: Cocentaina

Government
  - Alcalde: Luis Miguel Tomás López (2005) (PP)

Area
  - Total: 20.20 km^{2} (7.80 sq mi)
- Elevation: 398 m (1,306 ft)

Population (2025-01-01)
  - Total: 1,117
  - Density: 55.30/km^{2} (143.2/sq mi)
- Demonym(s): Beniarresí, beniarresina
- Time zone: UTC+1 (CET)
  - Summer (DST): UTC+2 (CEST)
- Postal code: 03850
- Official language(s): Valencian

Beniarrés (Valencian: [beniaˈres], Spanish: [benjaˈres]) is a municipality in the comarca of Comtat in the Valencian Community, Spain.
