= Benilloba =

- Municipality
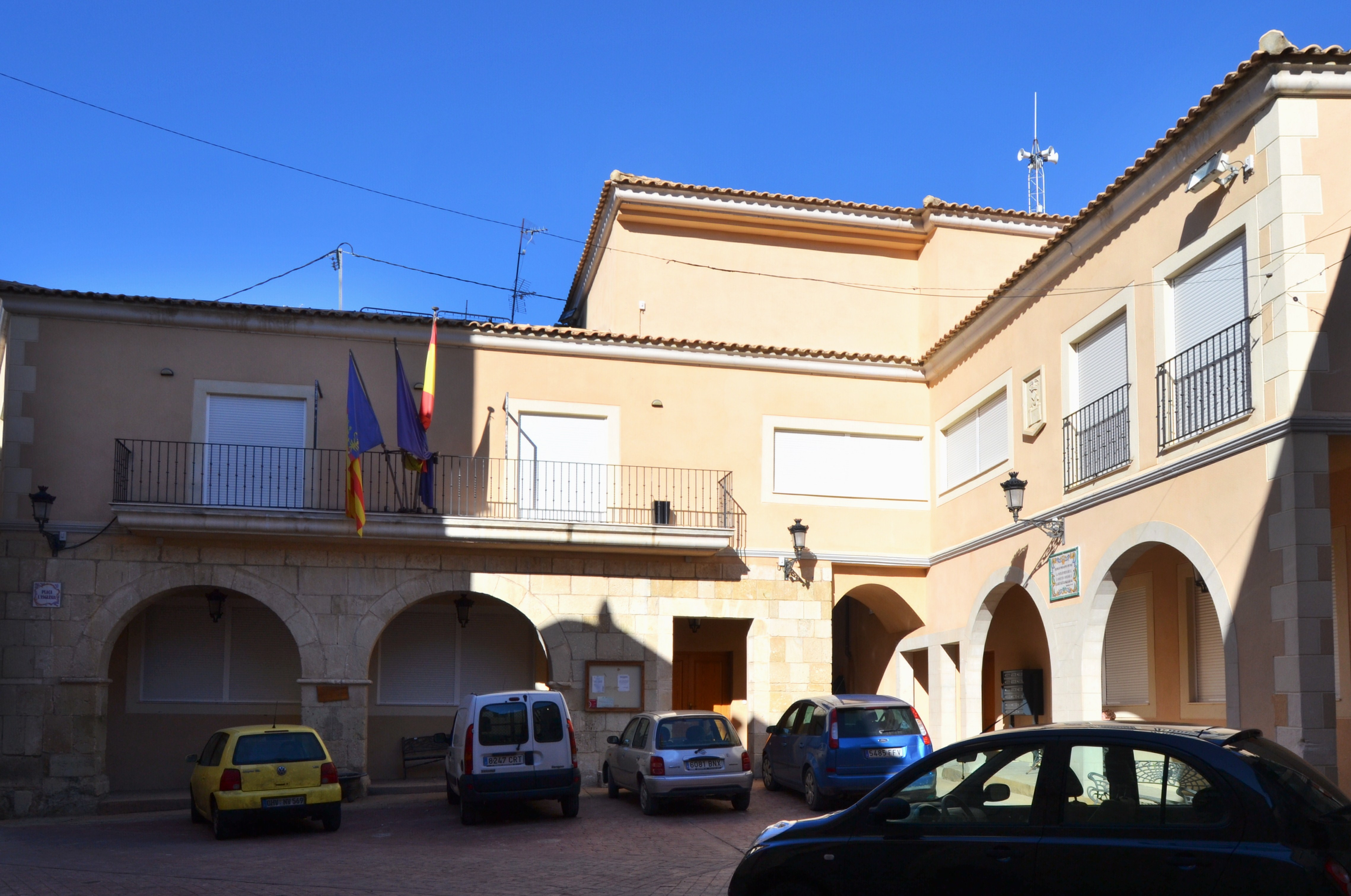
- Town hall

- Coat of arms

- Location within the Valencian Community
- Coordinates: 38°41′57″N 0°23′28″W
- Country: Spain
- Autonomous community: Valencian Community
- Province: Alicante
- Comarca: Comtat
- Judicial district: Alcoi

Government
  - Alcalde: Maria Fernanda Sanz Biosca (PP)

Area
  - Total: 9.5 km^{2} (3.7 sq mi)
- Elevation: 520 m (1,710 ft)

Population (2025-01-01)
  - Total: 744
  - Density: 78/km^{2} (200/sq mi)
- Demonym(s): benillober, -a (Val.) benillobero, -a (Sp.)
- Time zone: UTC+1 (CET)
  - Summer (DST): UTC+2 (CEST)
- Postal code: 03810
- Official language(s): Valencian; Spanish

Benilloba (Valencian: [beniˈʎoba]; Spanish: [beniˈʎoβa]) is a municipality in the comarca of Comtat in the Valencian Community, Spain.
