= Alfafara =

- Municipality
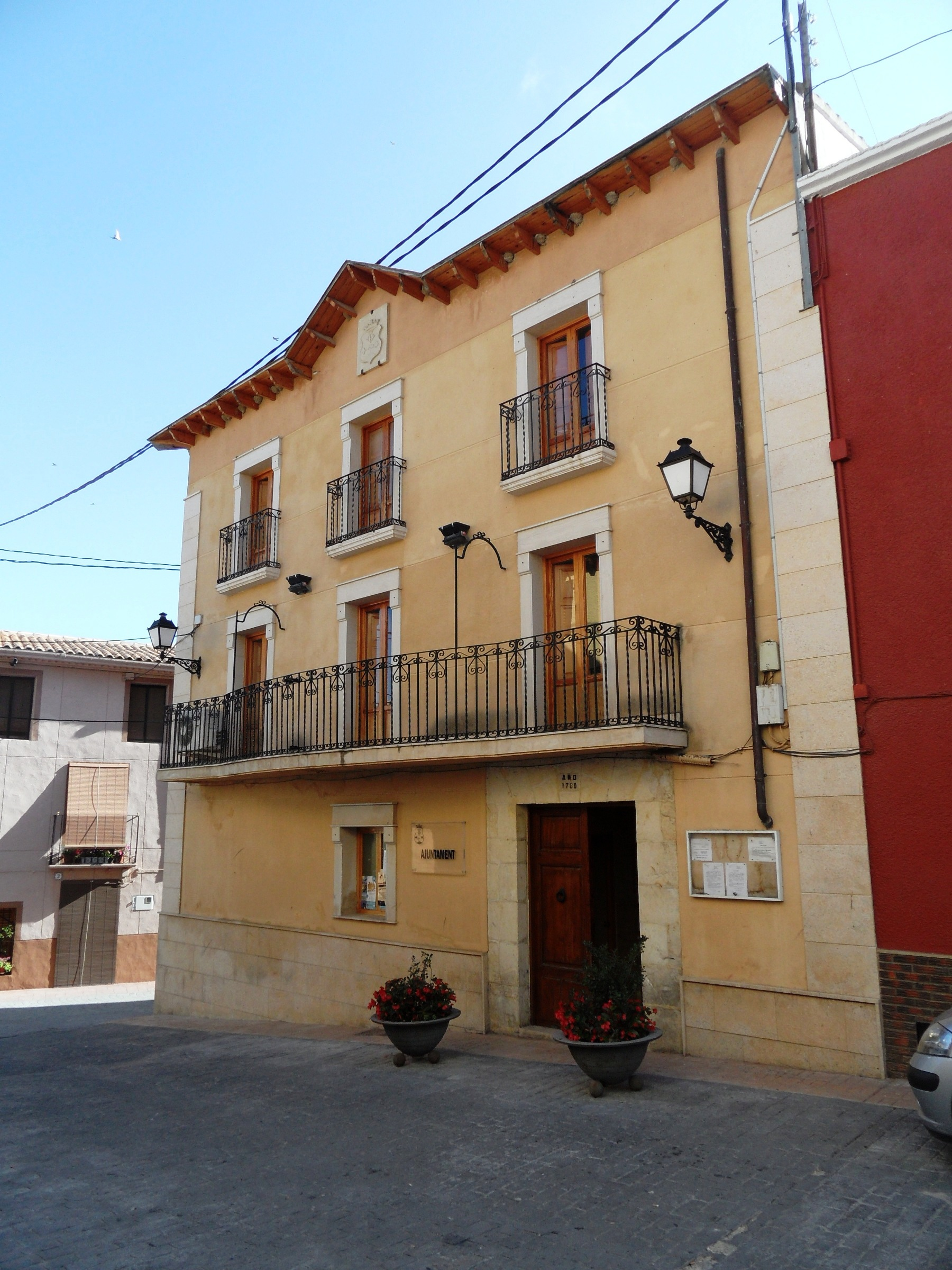
- Town hall

- Coat of arms

- Location within the Valencian Community
- Coordinates: 38°46′21″N 0°33′22″W
- Country: Spain
- Autonomous community: Valencian Community
- Province: Alicante
- Comarca: Comtat
- Judicial district: Alcoy

Government
  - Mayor: José Sanz Pascual (PSPV-PSOE)

Area
  - Total: 19.78 km^{2} (7.64 sq mi)
- Elevation: 582 m (1,909 ft)

Population (2025-01-01)
  - Total: 419
  - Density: 21.2/km^{2} (54.9/sq mi)
- Demonym: Alfafarences
- Time zone: UTC+1 (CET)
  - Summer (DST): UTC+2 (CEST)
- Postal code: 03838
- Official language(s): Valencian

Alfafara (Valencian: [alfaˈfaɾa]; Spanish: [alfaˈfaɾa]) is a municipality in the comarca of Comtat in the Valencian Community, Spain.

== See also ==
- Serra Mariola Natural Park
