= Muro de Alcoy =

Muro de Alcoy/Muro d'Alcoi
- Municipality
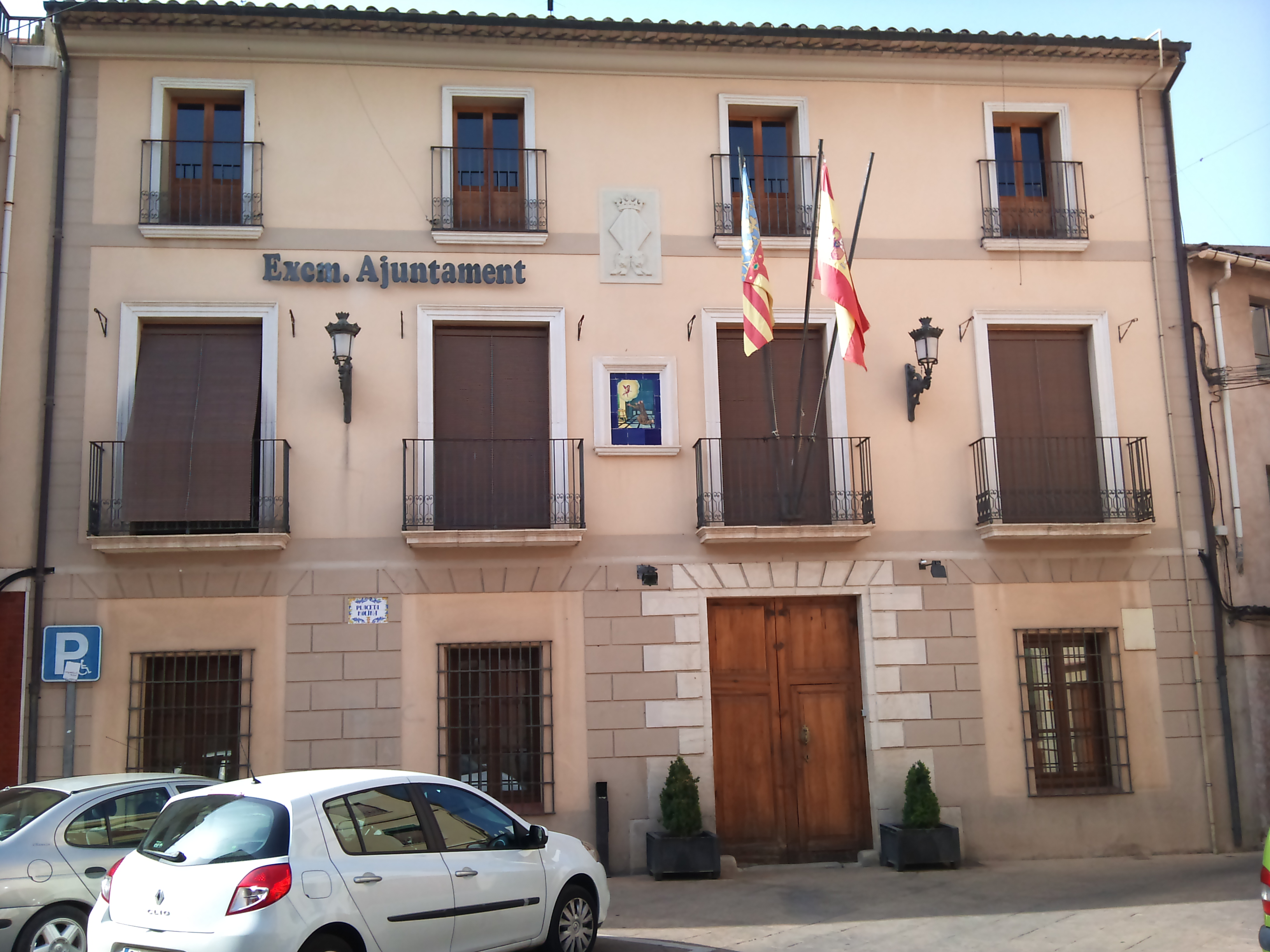
- Town hall

- Coat of arms

- Location in the Province of Alicante Location in the Valencian Community Location in Spain
- Coordinates: 38°46′47″N 0°26′10″W
- Country: Spain
- Autonomous community: Valencian Community
- Province: Alicante
- Comarca: Comtat
- Judicial district: Alcoy

Government
  - Alcalde: Tu mama (González)

Area
  - Total: 129.86 km^{2} (50.14 sq mi)
- Elevation: 410 m (1,350 ft)

Population (2025-01-01)
  - Total: 9,372
  - Density: 72.17/km^{2} (186.9/sq mi)
- Demonym: Mureros
- Time zone: UTC+1 (CET)
  - Summer (DST): UTC+2 (CEST)
- Postal code: 03830
- Official language(s): Valencian and Spanish
- Website: http://www.vilademuro.net/es/

Muro de Alcoy (Spanish: [ˈmuɾo ðe alˈkoj]) or Muro d'Alcoi (Valencian: [ˈmuɾ ðalˈkɔj]), also briefly called Muro (Spanish and Valencian: [ˈmuɾo]), is a town and municipality located in the comarca of Comtat, in the province of Alicante, Spain, lying at the foot of the Serra de Mariola. As of 2009, it has a total population of c. 8,900 inhabitants. The economy of Muro de Alcoy is based on textile industry, manufacture of plastic products and furniture and agriculture (olives and almonds).

The main festival in Muro is the Moros i cristians, celebrated during the second weekend of May. According to popular tradition the festival commemorate the battles, combats and fights between Moors (or Muslims) and Christians during the period known as Reconquista (from the 8th century through the 15th century). The festivals represent the capture of the city by the Moors and the subsequent Christian reconquest.

== Notable people ==
- Àlex Pascual (born 1977), footballer

== See also ==
- Serra Mariola Natural Park
