= Llíber =

Village in Spain

Coordinates: 38°45′N 0°01′E

Llíber's coat of arms

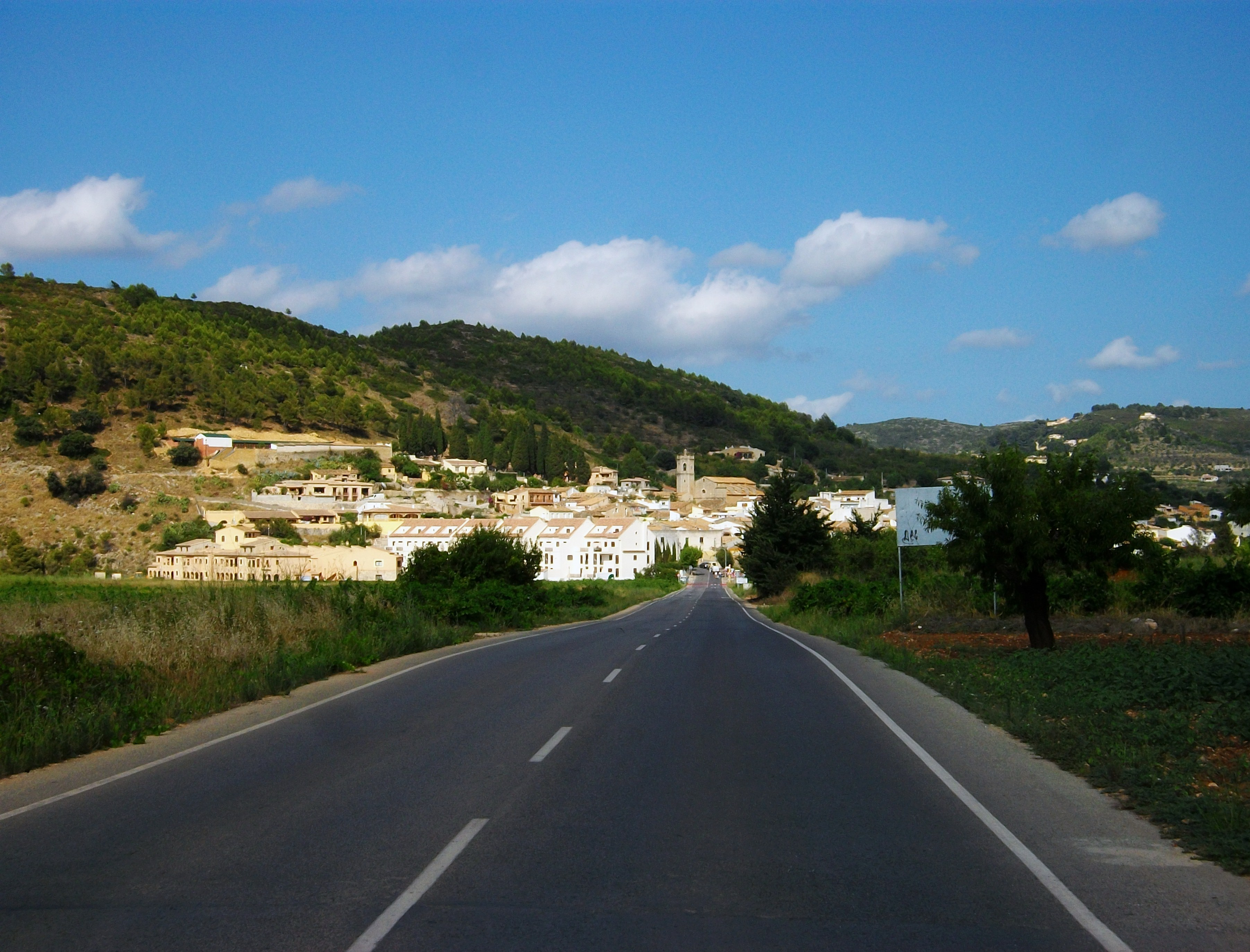
View of Llíber from Jalón

Llíber is a village in the province of Alicante and autonomous community of Valencia, Spain. The municipality covers an area of 21.9 square kilometres (8.5 sq mi).

== Geography ==
Llíber is a municipality of Comunidad Valenciana, Spain. It is located in the north-east of the Province of Alicante, within the region of the Marina Alta and is one of a number of villages in the area known as Vall de Pop. It has 1,099 inhabitants, of which 62.80% are of foreign nationality (National Institute of Statistics - Spain 2015). Llíber is bordered by the neighbourhood Penya Roja to the north with Lloma Llarga and Tossal del Cau to the south. Llíber is accessed from the AP7 motorway, exiting at junction 63, on the CV745 from Benissa, or from the N332 at Gata de Gorgos on the CV748. Llíber borders the municipalities of Alcalalí, Benissa, Gata de Gorgos, Jalón, Pedreguer and Senija.

== History ==
Located to the north of the municipal area is the Iberian town of Pozo de Gata. The Iberians used to build their settlements in high places in order to obtain a better defence against their enemies. For this same reason, they also walled them. Llíber and the surrounding lands were conquered in 1256 by King James I of Aragon. The lady Constance of Sicily enjoyed the Llíber incomes until November 1300, when James II transferred the incomes to those of those of Pego and La Vall d'Uixó. From 1413 until 1444 Llíber was part of the dominion of the Martorell, lineage to which belonged the famous novelist, Joanot Martorell. In 1444 the town of Llíber was sold at auction at the request of the creditors of Galceran Martorell. The purchasers were Gonzalo de Híjar, Comendador de Montalbán and his wife, Inés, de Portugal. On September 12, 1444, Gonzalo de Hijar, sold Llíber to his son Pedro. Later it belonged to the Duke of Almodóvar. In 1609, Llíber had 25 houses and was an annex of Xaló which became independent. Until 1707 Llíber belonged to the government of Xàtiva (Júcar), which until 1833 was part of the government (township) of Dénia. In 1992 an Englishman, Lord Perry Harber, extended the village by designing and building 80 properties on a disused vineyard.

== Agriculture ==
More than half of the land remains uncultivated, with dryland agriculture predominating in the cultivated areas with olive, grape and almond being the most prominent crops.

== Festivals ==
The major annual festival is celebrated in mid-August, in honour of Saint Roch (San Roque).

== Gallery ==
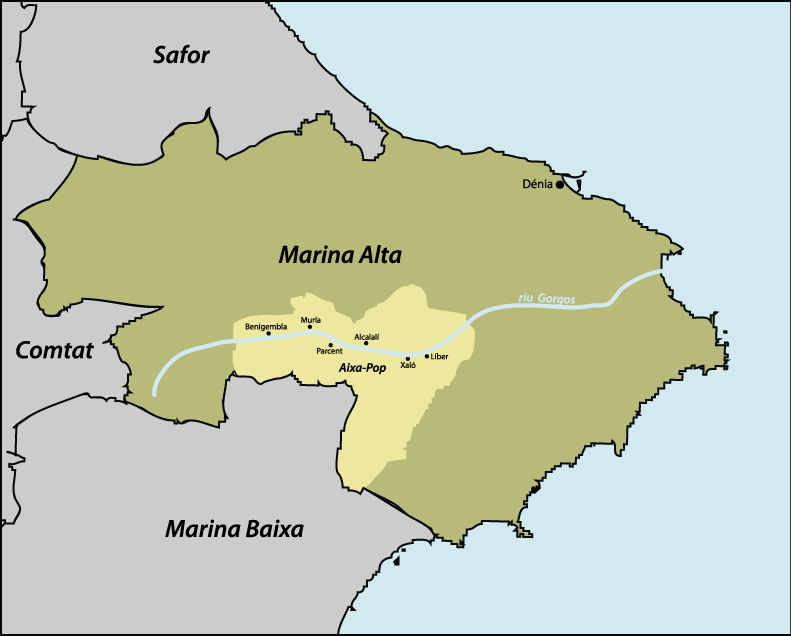
Vall de Pop, Marina Alta

The municipality of Llíber, Marina Alta

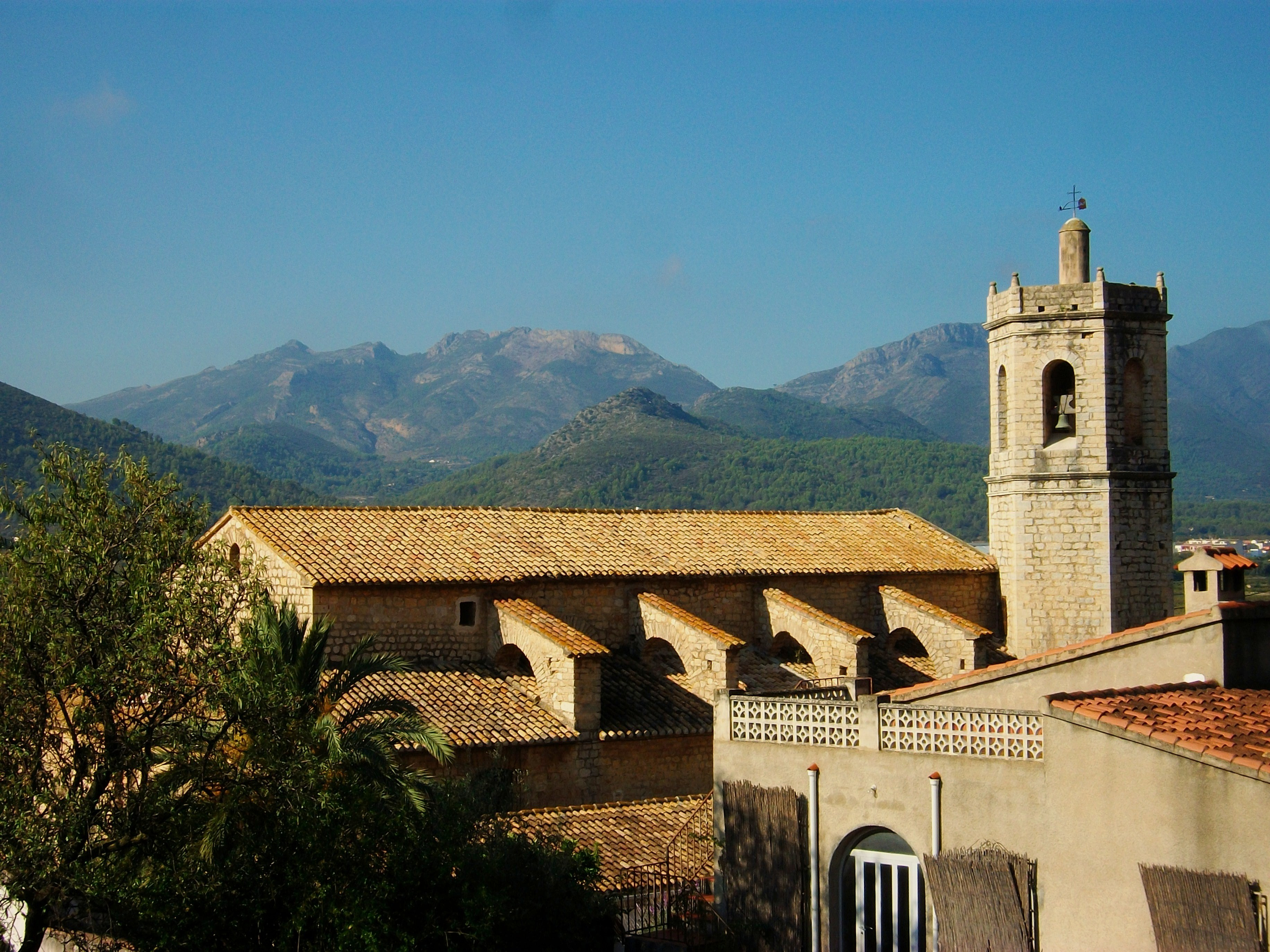
The Church of Saint Cosmé and Saint Damián, Llíber

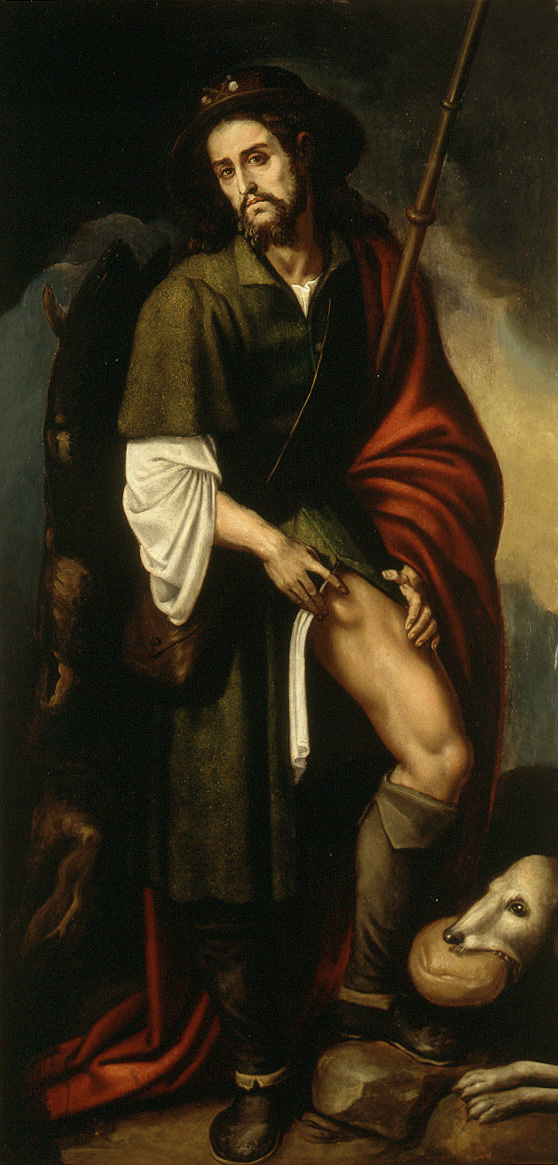
San Roque, patron saint of Llíber
