= Orba, Spain =

Orba
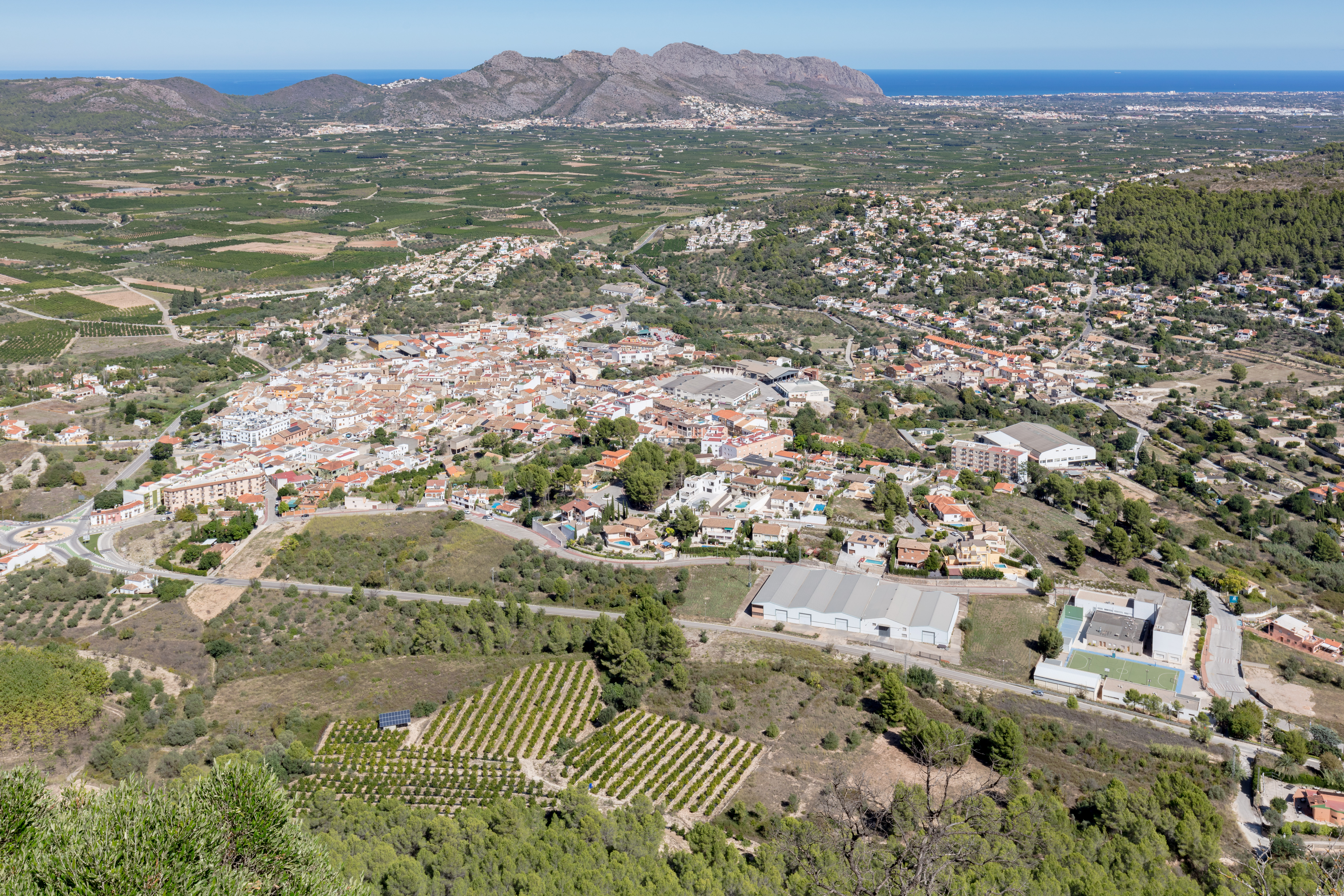
- View of Orba from El Castellet

- Coat of arms

- Location within Spain
- Coordinates: 38°46′48″N 0°3′52″E
- Country: Spain
- Province: Alicante
- Comarca: Marina Alta

Government
  - Mayor: Ignasi Cervera Arbona (Compromís; 2015)

Area
  - Total: 17.73 km^{2} (6.85 sq mi)
- Elevation: 154 m (505 ft)

Population (2025-01-01)
  - Total: 2,399
  - Density: 135.3/km^{2} (350.4/sq mi)
  - Language: Valencian
- Demonym(s): Orber, -a (Valencian)
- Distance to Alicante: 78 km (48 mi) northeast
- Website: www.orba.es

Orba (Valencian: [ˈɔɾba]; Spanish: [ˈoɾβa]) is a small town and municipality in the comarca of Marina Alta in the Valencian Community, Spain.

It is situated in the River Gerona valley and is bordered by Pego to the north; Benidoleig and Ondara to the north-east; Xaló and Pedreguer to the east and Parcent and Alcalalí to the south.

The town has many commercial premises including mini-supermarkets, restaurants and cafe-bars, hair stylist salons and a barbers shop. The town is also well served with four banks, two builders merchants and two estate agents. In addition to the indigenous population, the town and surrounding area is now home to expatriates from throughout the European Union, many of whom are permanent residents and are gainfully employed within the local community.

The location of Orba in Marina Alta
