= La Vall d'Alcalà =

Vall d'Alcalá
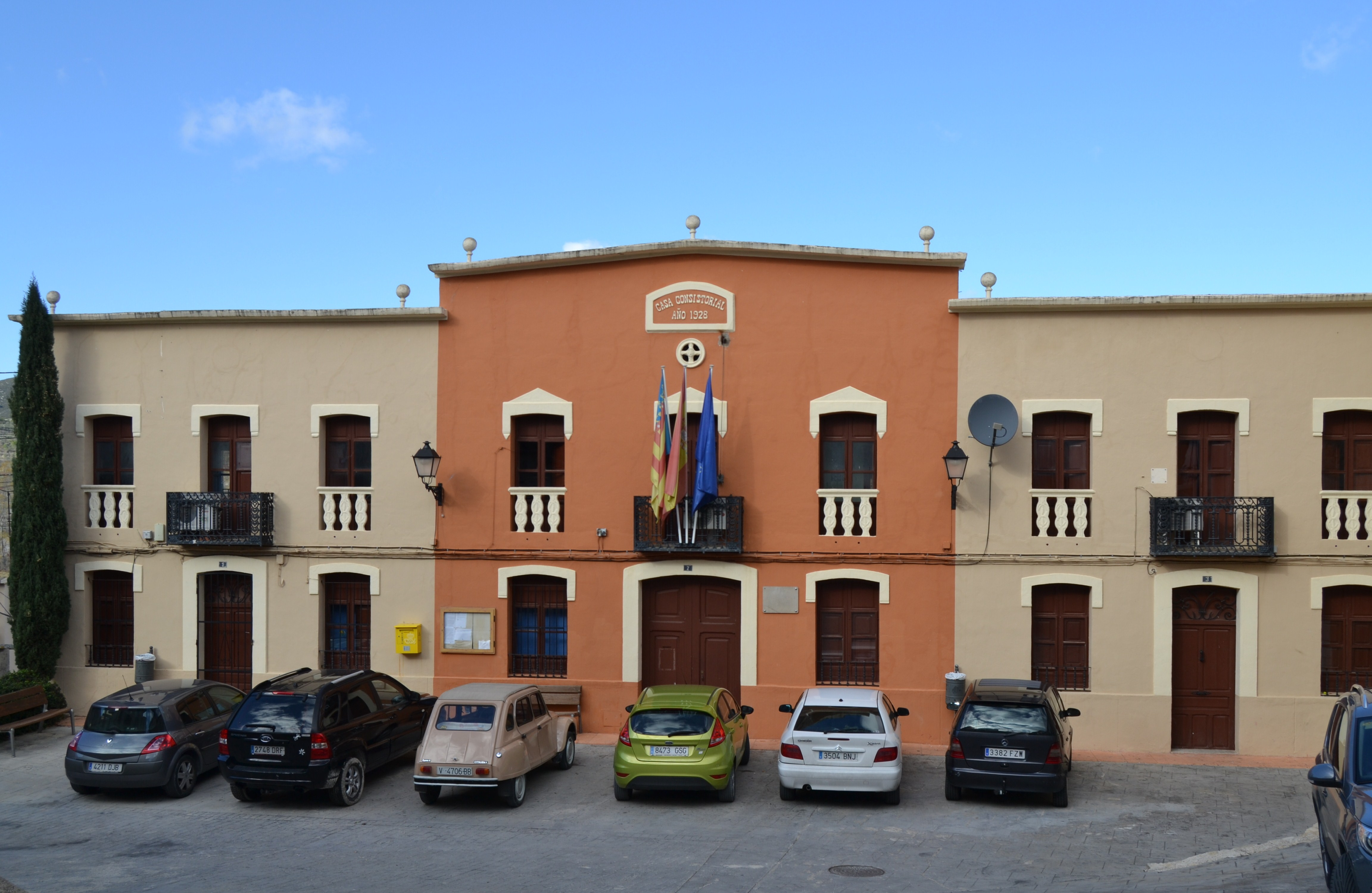

- Coat of arms

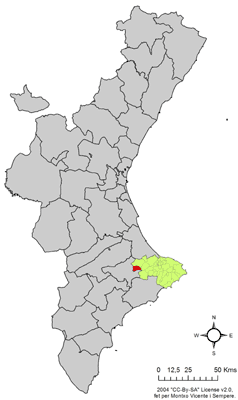
- Location of Vall de Alcalá within the Comunidad Valenciana

- Location of Vall de Alcalá within Marina Alta
- Coordinates: 38°47′40″N 0°15′10″W

Area
  - Total: 24.40 km^{2} (9.42 sq mi)
- Elevation: 637 m (2,090 ft)

Population (2025-01-01)
  - Total: 159
- Demonym(s): Alcalanero, -a
- Postal code: 03788
- Official language(s): Valencian
- Website: Official website

La Vall d'Alcalà (Valencian pronunciation: [la ˈvaʎ dalkaˈla], Spanish: Valle de Alcalá [ˈbaʎe ðe alkaˈla]) is a valley in the Marina Alta region of Alicante, Spain.

The area contains two villages: Alcalà de la Jovada and Beniaia. In the past, there were also another five villages, some of them now uninhabited or in ruins; they were: Criola, Benialí, Benixarco, La Roca and La Adsubia/L'Atzúvia (Benialí is not to be confused with an existing village of the same name, found in the neighbouring valley of Gallinera).

According to the 2005 census, Alcalà and Beniaia's inhabitants add up to a total of 165. Until the 1950s the villages had well over 500 inhabitants (642 in 1910), but a steady decline started in the 1960s as families emigrated to the nearby larger towns of Pego, Oliva, Gandia, Muro d'Alcoi, Cocentaina and Alcoi.

== History ==
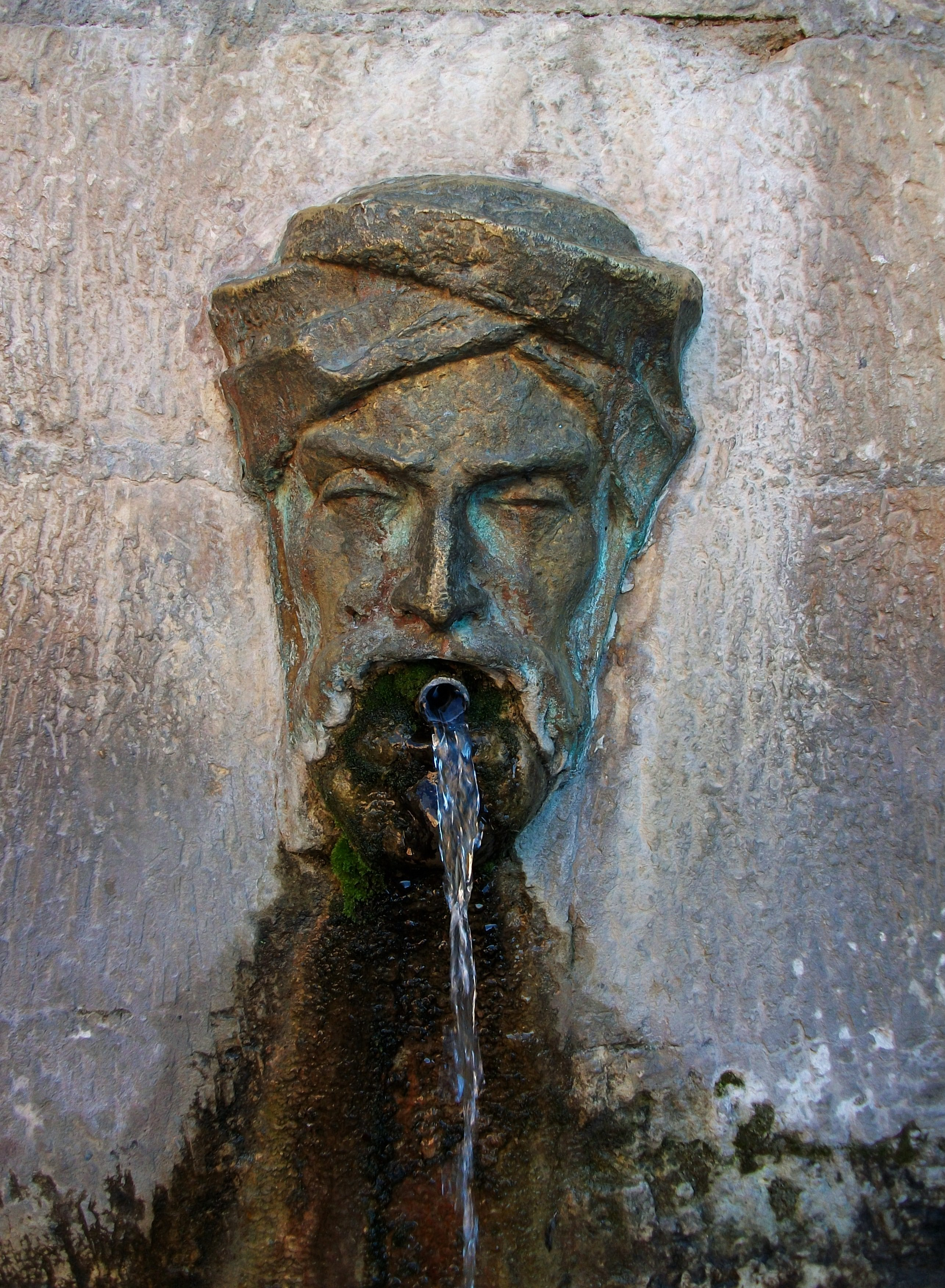
Font d'Al-Azraq.

The village of Vall d'Alcalà is well-known for being the birthplace of Al-Azraq, a Moorish commander who signed an important treaty with King James I of Aragon in 1245, known as the Al-Azraq Treaty of 1245, locally known as the 'Tractat del Pouet' ('Treaty of the little well') because it was signed beside a small water source just outside the village.

Al-Azraq famously betrayed the treaty in 1245 and 1258 when he unsuccessfully tried to defeat James I's army. The battles are still remembered today all around the region, when towns gather to watch Moros i Cristians or 'Moors and Christians' parades. The ones held in Alcoi are by far the most famous and spectacular, and are televised live on Canal Nou television as well as occasionally on state channel TVE.

Both Alcalà and Beniaia have their own Moors and Christians parades too, in August and September respectively, albeit on a much smaller scale.

== Economy ==
Cherries, almonds and olives are the main exports from Vall d'Alcalà. Many of the cherries bought overseas in, for example, the UK, come from the valley, which has its own Denominación de Origen, 'Muntanya d'Alacant'.

== Etymology ==
Alcalà comes from the Arabic لقلعة for 'The citadel', al-qal'a.

== Local sights and amenities ==
The village of Alcalà de la Jovada has three bars, a campsite (currently closed), a hotel, a public swimming-pool, a sports complex, an internet café, a cultural centre/theatre, a chemist and a church. It however does not have a general store or supermarket.

The ruined Moorish village of L'Atzuvieta is nearby, as are two domes which were packed with snow in the winter so as to keep food cold during the warmer months. These are called neveras (neveres in Valencian). The upper nevera is called Nevera de Dalt, the lower one Nevera de Baix. 'Nevera' is the modern word for refrigerator, but the origins of the word come from nieve (neu in Valencian) meaning snow.

Further down towards the neighbouring La Vall d'Ebo village, there is a cave that was discovered in 1919 by a local hunter called José Vicente Mengual, known locally as El tío Rull or 'Uncle Rull'. His dog chased a rabbit down a hole and did not come back. He then sent his ferret down and that did not return either. Finally, he moved some rocks and discovered a cave containing stalactites and stalagmites. The cave, which officially bears his nickname La Cova del Rull, is open to the public.

The village of La Vall d'Alcalà celebrates its week-long festa on normally the first but sometimes the second weekend of August. Beniaia celebrates its own, smaller festa in September.
