= Les Marines =

Les Marines refers to the Valencian comarques (regions) of:

- Marina Alta ("Upper Marina")
- Marina Baixa ("Lower Marina")

== See also ==
- Central comarques of the Valencian Community
