= Marina Alta =

- Comarca
- Country: Spain
- Community: Valencian Community
- Province: Alacant / Alicante
- Capital and largest city: Dénia
- Municipalities: 33 municipalities: Alcalalí, L'Atzúbia, Beniarbeig, Benidoleig, Benigembla, Benimeli, Benissa, El Poble Nou de Benitatxell / Benitachell, Calp, Castell de Castells, Dénia, Gata de Gorgos, Llíber, Murla, Ondara, Orba, Parcent, Pedreguer, Pego, Els Poblets, El Ràfol d'Almúnia, Sagra, Sanet i els Negrals, Senija, Teulada, Tormos, La Vall d'Alcalà, La Vall d'Ebo, La Vall de Gallinera, La Vall de Laguar, El Verger, Xàbia / Jávea, Xaló

Area
  - Total: 767.2 km^{2} (296.2 sq mi)

Population (2023)
  - Total: 191,265
  - Density: 249.3/km^{2} (645.7/sq mi)
- Time zone: UTC+1 (CET)
  - Summer (DST): UTC+2 (CEST)

Marina Alta (Valencian: [maˈɾina ˈalta]; Spanish: [maˈɾina ˈalta]; lit. "Upper Marina") is a central and coastal comarca of the autonomous community of Valencia, Spain. The comarca is located in the area of Alicante (Alacant) and its capital and largest settlement is the city of Dénia.

Marina Alta borders the comarca of Safor to the north, the Mediterranean Sea to the north and east, the comarca of Marina Baixa to the south and Comtat to the west.

Marina Alta and Marina Baixa are commonly referred to as Les Marines. Historically, the comarca is also known as the Marquesat (Marquisate of Dénia).

== Geography ==
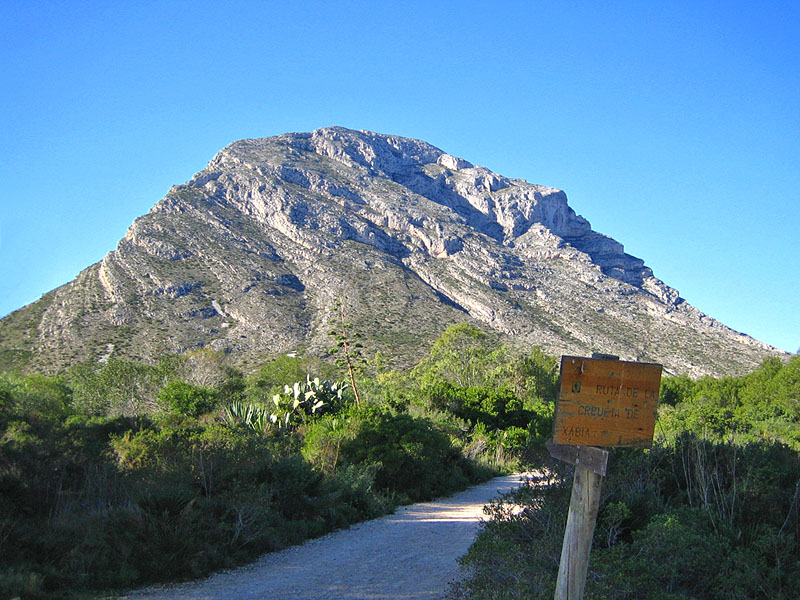
The Montgó Massif, seen from the plateau between Dénia and Xàbia.

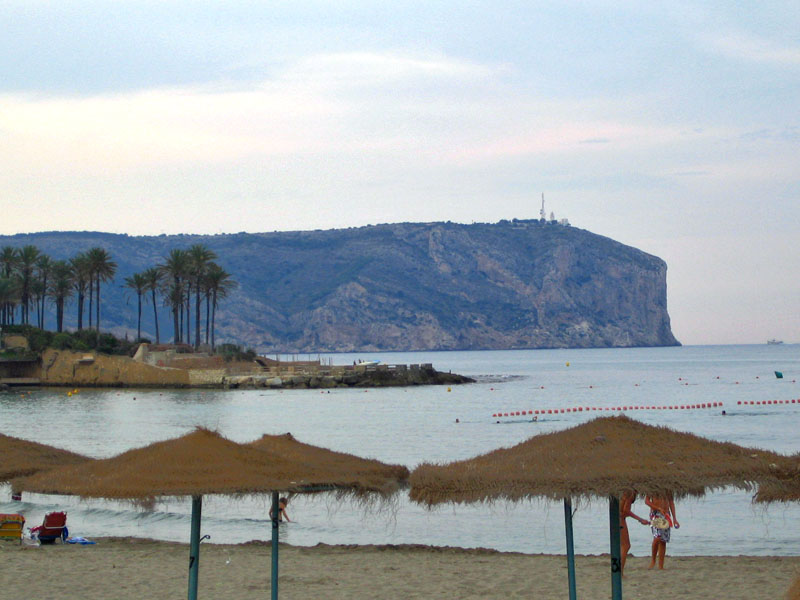
Cape San Antonio seen from the Arenal beach, Xàbia.

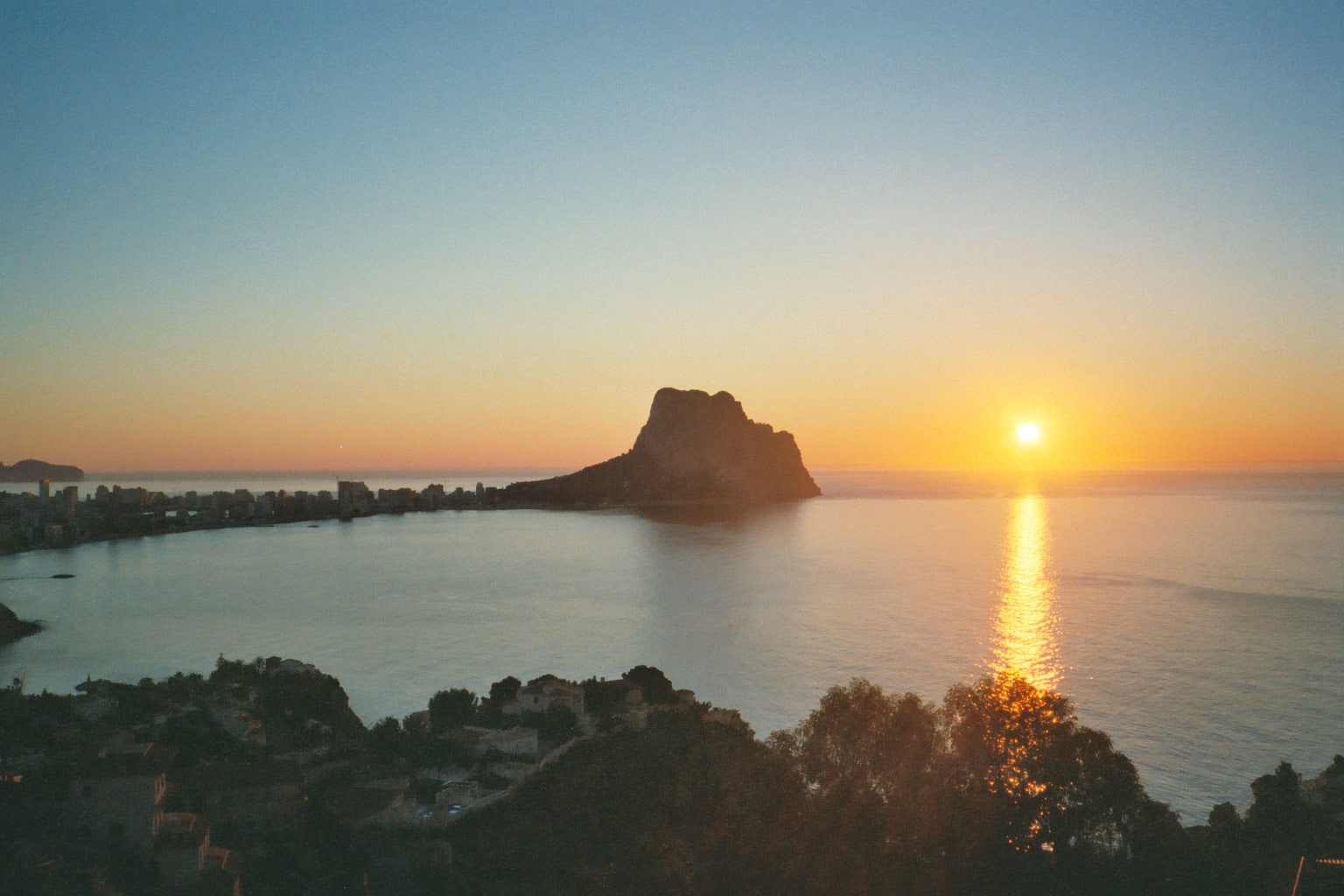
View of the Peñón de Ifach (Penyal d'Ifac) in Calp.

Marina Alta is a coastal comarca that marks a transition point between the flat, open coastline of Safor—dominated by orange cultivation—and the maritime cliffs of Marina Baixa, where crops like medlars and grapes are hidden in inland valleys.

The region is sharply divided into three plains separated by rugged mountains. The largest agricultural area surrounds the Girona river, encompassing Dénia, El Verger, and Ondara. To the south, a plain stretches along the Gorgos river from Xàbia to Gata de Gorgos, predominated by almond trees and vineyards. Finally, there is a marshland area in the extreme north, between Pego and the coast, forming the Marjal de Pego-Oliva Natural Park.

=== Orography ===
The coastline of Marina Alta is dominated by four major mountains: the Segària mountain range (500 m), the Montgó Massif (752 m), the Bèrnia range (1,126 m), and Puig de la Llorença (436 m). Inland, several ranges belonging to the Baetic System—such as Foradada, Carrasca d'Ebo, and Carrascar de Parcent—create a series of difficult-to-access valleys called the Valls de la Marina Alta. These valleys are oriented primarily east-west and are carved by rivers flanked by steep terrain. The only inland valley offering a modest plain is the Vall de Pop.

=== Hydrography ===
The main rivers in the comarca are the Bullent and the Molinell, which form the northern border and feed the Pego marsh; the Girona and the Gorgos, which water the alluvial plains of Dénia and Xàbia respectively. In addition to these rivers, there are numerous seasonal ravines (barrancos) that can overflow during heavy autumn rains, as occurred with the Girona river in October 2007.

=== Climate ===
The comarca features a Mediterranean climate with abundant sunshine. However, due to its maritime location between the Catalan Sea and the main Mediterranean basin, it frequently experiences strong storms during summer and autumn. The rainiest area in the Valencian Community is located at the northern tip of the comarca, near the mouth of the Molinell river. Conversely, the southern areas and inland valleys are much drier. The proximity to the Pityusic Islands often gives the comarca a weather pattern more characteristic of an island than the peninsula.

== Municipalities ==
The comarca of la Marina Alta comprises 33 municipalities, of which the most northeasterly two - Dénia and adjacent Xàbia (Jávea) - form the largest urban area. These are listed below with their areas and populations:

Name	Area in km^{2}	Population (2001)	Population (2011)	Population (2023)
Alcalalí	14.4	902	1,334	1,397
L'Atzúbia (Adsubia)	14.7	550	677	608
Beniarbeig	7.4	1,315	1,881	2,353
Benidoleig	7.5	890	1,187	1,218
Benigembla	18.4	488	519	537
Benimeli	3.5	334	411	455
Benissa	69.7	9,821	11,613	12,279
El Poble Nou de Benitatxell / Benitachell	12.7	2,385	4,540	4,858
Calp	23.5	18,881	23,241	25,854
Castell de Castells	45.9	471	446	445
Dénia	66.2	33,342	42,743	45,622
Gata de Gorgos	20.3	5,129	6,129	6,515
Llíber	21.9	671	927	946
Murla	5.8	391	554	575
Ondara	10.4	5,511	6,568	7,308
Orba	17.7	1,693	2,272	2,379
Parcent	11.8	798	1,034	1,003
Pedreguer	29.6	5,945	7,434	8,558
Pego	52.9	10,060	10,418	10,485
Els Poblets	3.6	1,822	3,029	2,763
El Ràfol d'Almúnia	4.9	536	704	721
Sagra	5.6	401	439	442
Sanet i els Negrals	3.9	595	660	737
Senija	4.8	513	601	670
Teulada	32.2	8,453	12,094	12,515
Tormos	5.3	299	356	339
La Vall d'Alcalà	24.2	166	180	174
La Vall d'Ebo	32.4	318	278	230
La Vall de Gallinera	53.6	624	657	581
La Vall de Laguar	23.1	870	934	873
El Verger (Vergel)	8.2	3,744	4,856	5,101
Xàbia / Jávea	68.6	18,753	28,936	29,760
Xaló (Jalón)	34.6	2,025	2,875	2,964
Totals	767.2	138,696	180,527	191,265

Municipalities of Marina Alta

== Economy ==
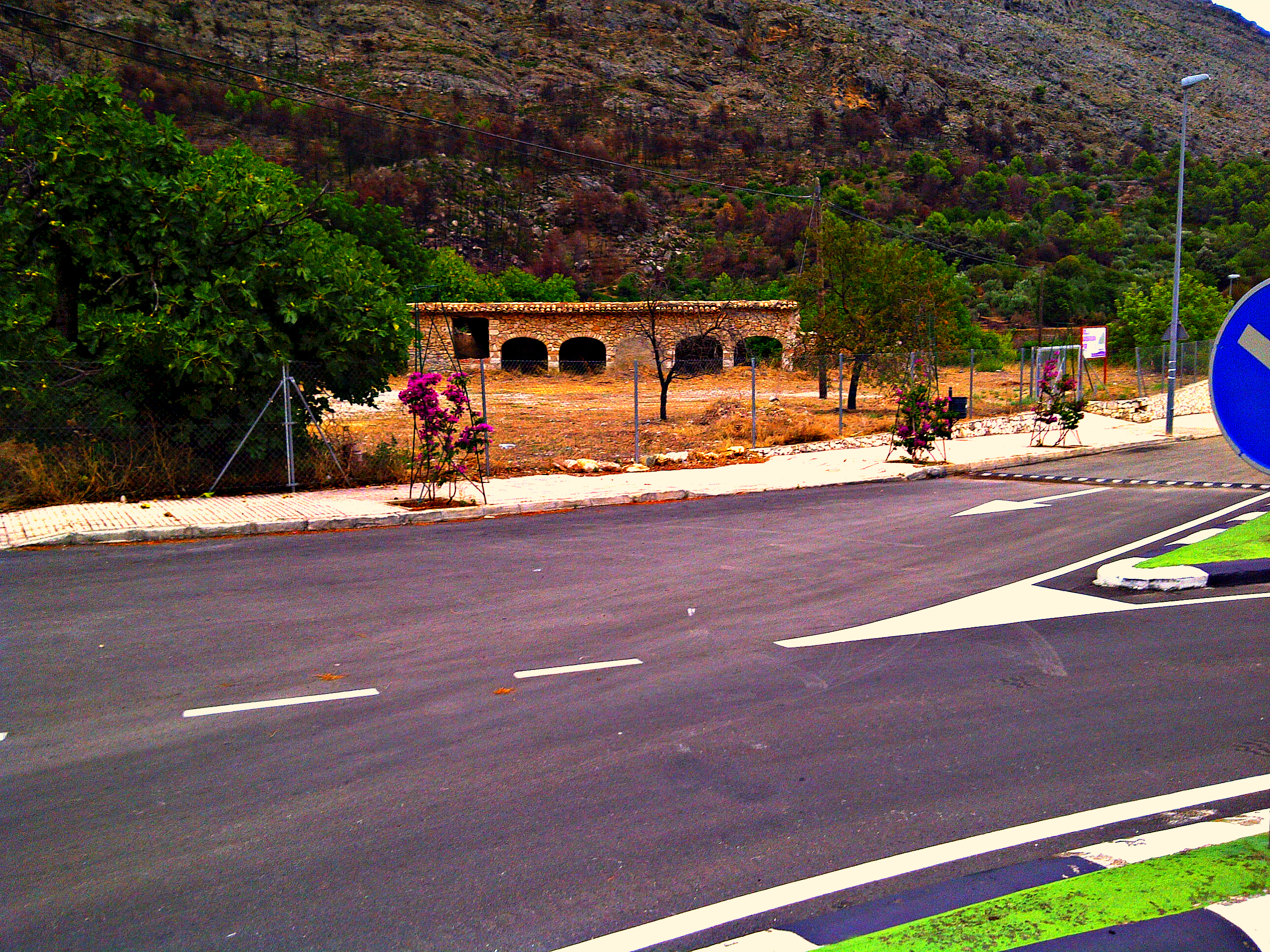
A typical riurau in Benigembla, traditionally used for drying raisins.

Marina Alta has historically relied on agriculture in its inland municipalities—primarily citrus fruits, grapes, and cherries—and fishing along the coast. During the 19th century, the production of raisins and mistela significantly enriched Dénia, Xàbia, Benissa, and Teulada. Following the tourism boom of the 1960s, the coastal economy shifted predominantly towards the service sector, with towns such as Calp, Dénia and Xàbia now heavily dependent on residential tourism, particularly from northern and central European residents.

Alongside tourism, the comarca sustains a diversified business base spanning food distribution, manufacturing, automotive services and hospitality. The shipping company Baleària, headquartered in Dénia with international operations, and the supermarket chain Más y Más (Pedreguer) rank among the hundred largest companies in the Valencian Community. Notable firms in the food sector include Overseas Import (Benissa) and Hammeken Cellars (Xàbia). In the industrial and services sector, Talleres Ginestar (Benissa) and Auto-Gata (Gata) operate in automotive services, while Textil Villa de Pego (Pego) manufactures agricultural meshes and agrotextiles. Tradia Hotel (Calp) is among the leading hospitality businesses in the comarca.

== Culture and Architecture ==
The local dialect of the region is the southern variant of Valencian, although some inland villages, historically repopulated by Majorcans, retain distinct Balearic phonetic and lexical traits.

The traditional architecture of the Marina comarca heavily features stone walls plastered in white or painted in bright colors (blue, red, yellow, and green) around windows and doors. The region is particularly known for specific rural structures such as casups, naies, and riuraus, the latter being porticoed structures specifically designed for drying raisins.

== Places of Interest ==
- The castle and the historic neighborhoods of les Roquetes and Baix la Mar in Dénia.
- Montgó Natural Park, including Cape San Antonio and the Cova Tallada.
- Marjal de Pego-Oliva Natural Park and the Bullent River.
- Peñón de Ifach in Calp.
- The historic center of Teulada, featuring medieval palaces and a Gothic loggia.
- The historic center of Benissa, known for its palatial houses and the large Puríssima Xiqueta church, often called the "Cathedral of the Marina".
- The prehistoric rock art at the Pla de Petracos sanctuary in the Vall de Laguar.
