= Alcalalí =

- Coat of arms

- Location with Valencia
- Coordinates: 38°44′58″N 0°02′30″E
- Country: Spain
- Community: Valencia
- Province: Alicante
- Comarca: Marina Alta

Government
  - Mayor: José Vicente; Marco Mestre (PP)

Area
  - Total: 14.4 km^{2} (5.6 sq mi)
- Elevation: 230 m (750 ft)

Population (2025-01-01)
  - Total: 1,428
  - Density: 99.2/km^{2} (257/sq mi)
  - Language: Valencian
- Demonyms: Alcanaliner, -a (va)
- Distance to Alicante: 78 km (48 mi) northeast
- Website: http://www.alcalali.es

Alcalalí (Valencian: [alkalaˈli]; Spanish: [alkalaˈli]) is a Valencian municipality in the comarca of Marina Alta, province of Alicante, Spain.

It is situated in the Pop Valley (Vall de Pop) between the Serra del Ferrer and the mounts of Segili. It is bordered by Pedreguer and Benidoleig to the north, Jalón (Xaló) and Llíber to the east; Orba, Murla, Benigembla and Parcent to the west and Tàrbena to the south.
