= Castell de Castells =

- Municipality
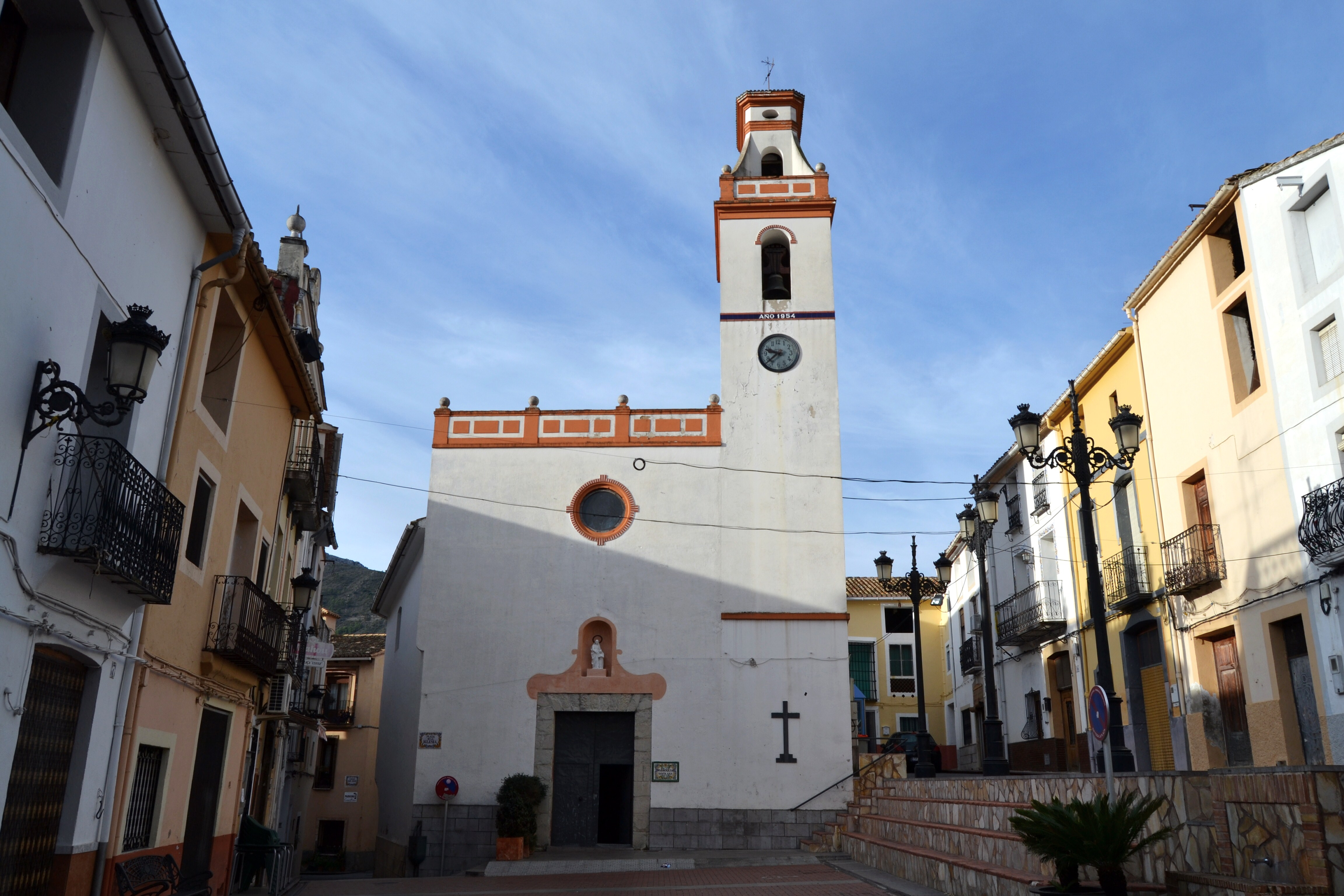

- Flag Coat of arms

- Location within Spain Location within Valencian Community Location within Europe
- Coordinates: 38°49′29″N 0°11′40″W
- Country: Spain
- Autonomous Community: Valencian Community
- Province: Alicante
- Comarca: Marina Alta

Government
  - Type: Mayor-council government
  - Body: Ajuntament de Castell de Castells
  - Mayor: Vicente Tomàs Estalrich (2023) (UPC-I)

Area
  - Total: 45.90 km^{2} (17.72 sq mi)
- Elevation: 551 m (1,808 ft)

Population (2025-01-01)
  - Total: 443
  - Density: 9.65/km^{2} (25.0/sq mi)
- Demonym(s): Castellenco, -ca (es) castellenc, ca (va)
- Time zone: CET (GMT +1)
  - Summer (DST): CEST (GMT +2)
- Postcode: 03793

Castell de Castells (Valencian: [kasˈteʎ de kasˈteʎs], Spanish: [kasˈtel de kasˈtels]) is a municipality high in the mountains of the Marina Alta on the Costa Blanca in southeastern Spain. The village is at the source of the Rio Jalón and surrounded by mountains. It is approximately 12 kilometres (7.5 mi) from the nearest village of Benigembla, and 20 kilometres (12 mi) from Jalón, the nearest large town. It is approximately one hour's drive to the beaches, the Fuentes de Algar, and Terra Mítica theme park. Also in the area are the caves of Vall d'Ebo and Benidoleig.

The highest peak of the Serrella mountain range, Malla de Llop, is over 1,300 metres (4,300 ft) high. The remains of the Arabic castle, Penya Castellet, and many trails are found in the area, popular for walking and mountain biking. The area has a rich history with three settlements around the village: Pla de Petracos, Bitla and Pla d'Alt. Travelers can visit Els Arcs' naturally formed arches which are some of the largest natural arches in Europe. The ruins of these settlements are now being rebuilt as modern homes.

The area and mountains are very popular with mountain bikers and walkers alike. Trails are well marked with white and yellow markers.

Five kilometres outside the village in the area known as Pla de Petracos are ancient cave paintings said to have been painted over 5000 years ago. Caves at the archaeological site have a viewing platform, and the paintings are explained on six interpretive panels.

There is also a museum in the village open on weekends

The village has an hotel, Hotel Serrella with restaurant. Two Casas Rural / bed and breakfast, Casa Pilar and Casa Blanca. Several bars, and other restaurants, all quite different and serving traditional or international dishes.

Three kilometres outside the village is an enormous natural arch, Els Arcs. Said to be one of the biggest in Europe.

== Fiestas ==
Every year there is an artisan market 2026 it will be held on weekend of 30 and 31 st. May.

- San Vicente Ferrer: Celebrated at Easter time.
- Week of Culture: This event will commence 22 July 2026 for about a week. With lots of activities through the week, music concerts in the square performed by the village band "La Primitiva", traditional dancing with entertainment for young and old.
- Santa Ana: 26 July is the day of Santa Ana, patron saint of Castell de Castells. This is a day of great celebration in the village with a candlelit procession through the streets in the evening.
- Summer Fiesta: Starts on 12 August, with one week of celebrations with events morning, noon and night. A typical Spanish fiesta is very noisy and tends to go on very late at night, so siestas are important in the afternoon, when it is extremely hot.
- Pla de Petracos: Early in September the village holds a great fiesta under the old trees in the ancient settlement of Petracos. Trees are lit with fairy lights, then music, food and dancing goes on through the night. On Sunday morning the Saint is carried from the village church to Petracos, about 5;km down the mountain. Mass is then held under the trees. Afterwards families gather for an aperitif before cooking their paella’s in the open air and continuing with the weekend fiesta.

== Flora and fauna ==
Plants and animals in the area include Narcissus assonanus, Narcissus dubious, Bee Orchids, Ophrys speculum, Venus' Mirror Orchid, Man Orchid, Aceras anthropophorum, Sombre Bee, Ophrys fusca Sawfly, Phrys tenthredinifera and Woodcock, Ophrys scolopax, also the Yellow Bee Orchid Ophrys lutea, the very rare Orchis italica, Fritillaria hispanica, and Dictamnus. Tulips include Tulipa australis.
