= L'Atzúbia =

L'Atzúbia Adsubia
- Municipality
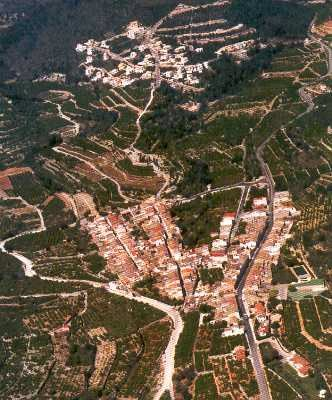

- Coat of arms

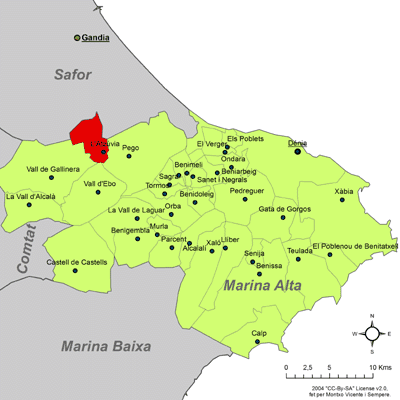
- Location in the comarca Marina Alta, within the Province of Alicante

- Location within Spain
- Coordinates: 38°45′44″N 0°11′17″E
- Country: Spain
- Autonomous community: Valencian Community
- Province: Alicante
- Comarca: Marina Alta

Government
  - Mayor: Josep Vicent Vidal Torralba (IAF)

Area
  - Total: 14.73 km^{2} (5.69 sq mi)
- Elevation: 102 m (335 ft)

Population (2025-01-01)
  - Total: 589
  - Density: 40.0/km^{2} (104/sq mi)
- Demonym(s): atzubià, -ana (Val.) adsubiano, -a (Sp.)
- Postcode: 03786
- Official language(s): Valencian; Spanish
- Website: www.atzubia-forna.org

L'Atzúbia (Valencian: [laˈdzubia]; Spanish: Adsubia [aðˈsuβja]) is a municipality in the comarca of Marina Alta in the north of the province of Alicante, in the Valencian Community, Spain.

It is enclaved in the Pego Valley. The neighbouring municipalities are: Vilallonga and Oliva to the north, Oliva and Pego to the east, La Vall de Gallinera and Vilallonga to the west; and La Vall de Gallinera and Pego to the south.
