= El Verger =

- Municipality
- Coat of arms

- Location in Spain
- Coordinates: 38°50′34″N 0°0′34″E
- Country: Spain
- Autonomous community: Valencian Community
- Province: Alicante
- Comarca: Marina Alta
- Judicial district: Dénia

Government
  - Alcalde: Ximo Coll (PSOE)

Area
  - Total: 8.16 km^{2} (3.15 sq mi)
- Elevation: 25 m (82 ft)

Population (2025-01-01)
  - Total: 5,508
  - Density: 675/km^{2} (1,750/sq mi)
- Demonym(s): Vergerí, vergerina Vergerer, vergerera
- Time zone: UTC+1 (CET)
  - Summer (DST): UTC+2 (CEST)
- Postal code: 03770
- Official language(s): Valencian
- Website: Official website

El Verger (Valencian pronunciation: [el veɾˈdʒeɾ]; Spanish: Vergel [beɾˈxel]) is a town of 4,992 inhabitants situated 3 kilometres from the Mediterranean Sea and 8 kilometres from Dénia, in the Comarca of Marina Alta, Valencian Community, Spain. The main attractions are the Main Street, two medieval towers and a neoclassical church. The town's crest, recently resuscitated, pays homage to its name: it displays two trees and four flowers.

The Prime Meridian crosses El Verger.

== Geography ==
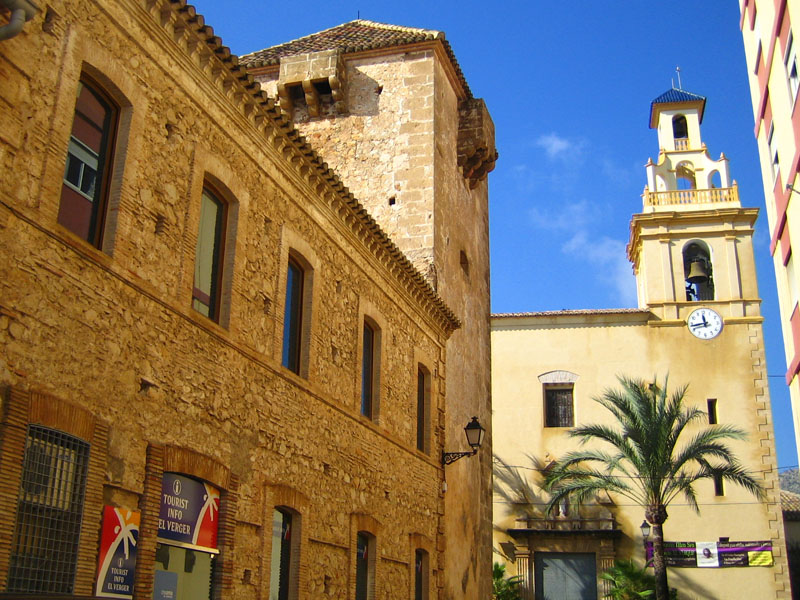
Church and tower of El Verger

The municipal boundaries confront those of Beniarbeig, Benimeli, Murla, Dénia, Ondara and Els Poblets. The town is 91 km from both Alicante and Valencia, and constitutes part of the frontier between the Province of Alicante and that of Valencia. The Mediterranean is 3 kilometres to the northeast. The town is split in two by the river Girona, which flooded catastrophically in 2007, destroying many houses and taking a life. The largest part of El Verger is to be found on the western side of the river, and three bridges provide access to the other side and to the sea beyond. Behind El Verger lies the Segària mountain range, a place popular for hiking and which gives the local school its name. A large part of the surrounding lands is dedicated to agriculture, specifically vegetables and citrus fruits.

== Gallery ==
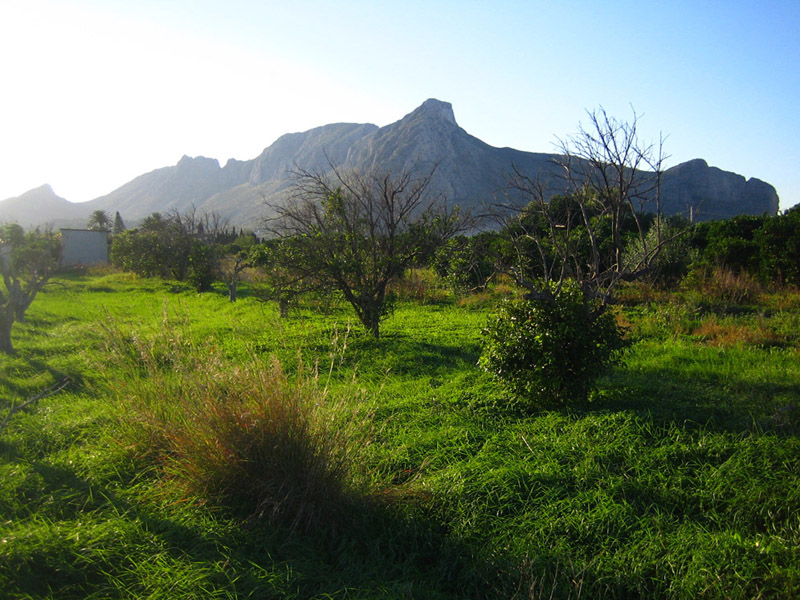
Segària, El Verger's mountain.

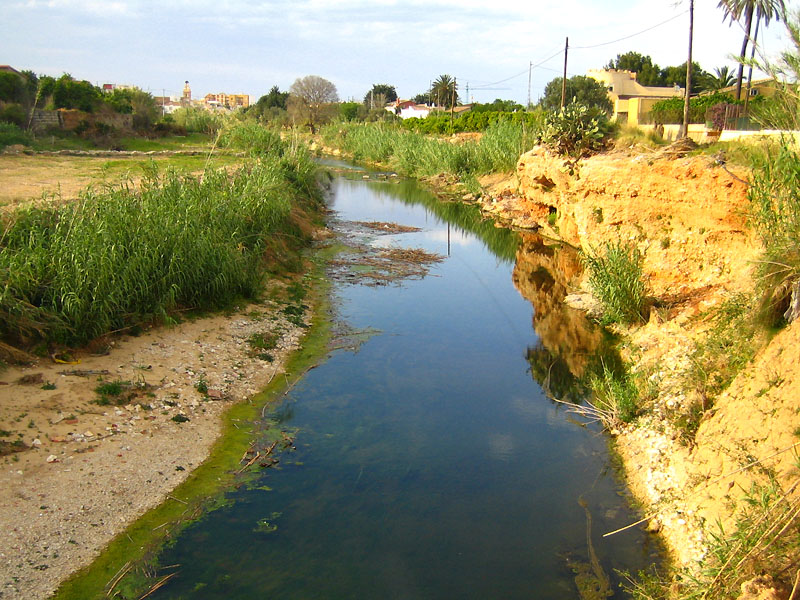
The river Girona at the height of El Verger.

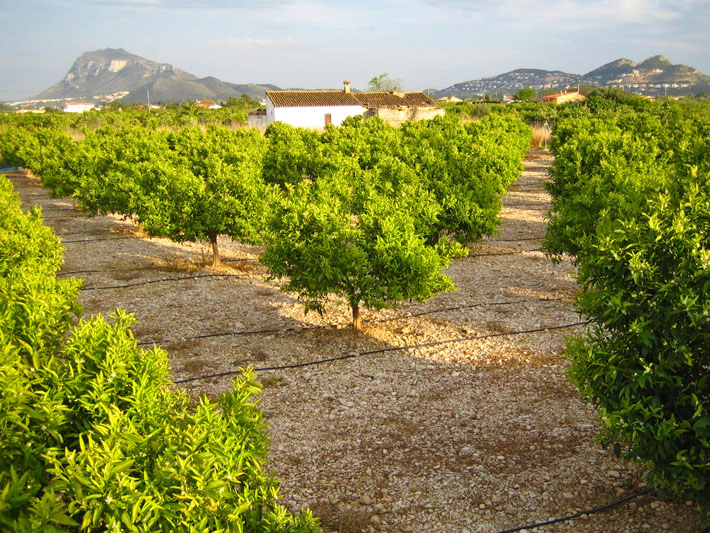
Orange groves in El Verger.

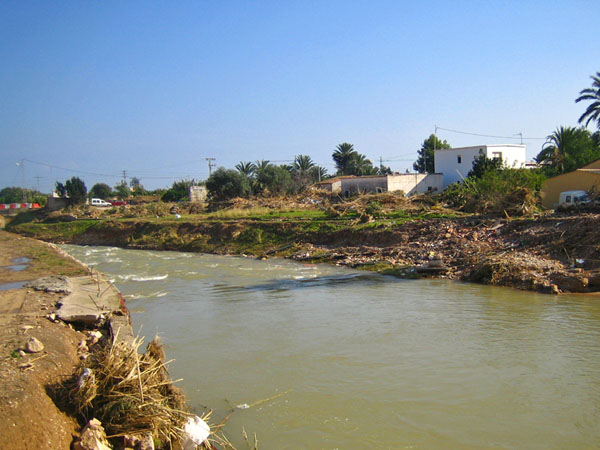
Photo of the damage done by the flood of October 2007, El Verger

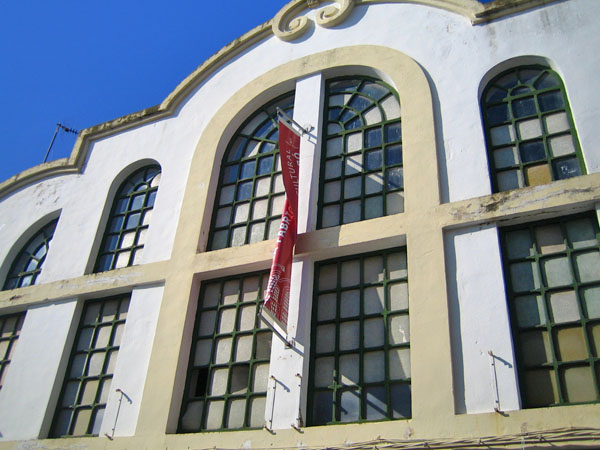
La Fàbrica de Sabó (The Soap Factory), El Verger's cultural centre
