= Senija =

Village in Alicante, Valencia, Spain

Coordinates: 38°43′N 0°03′E

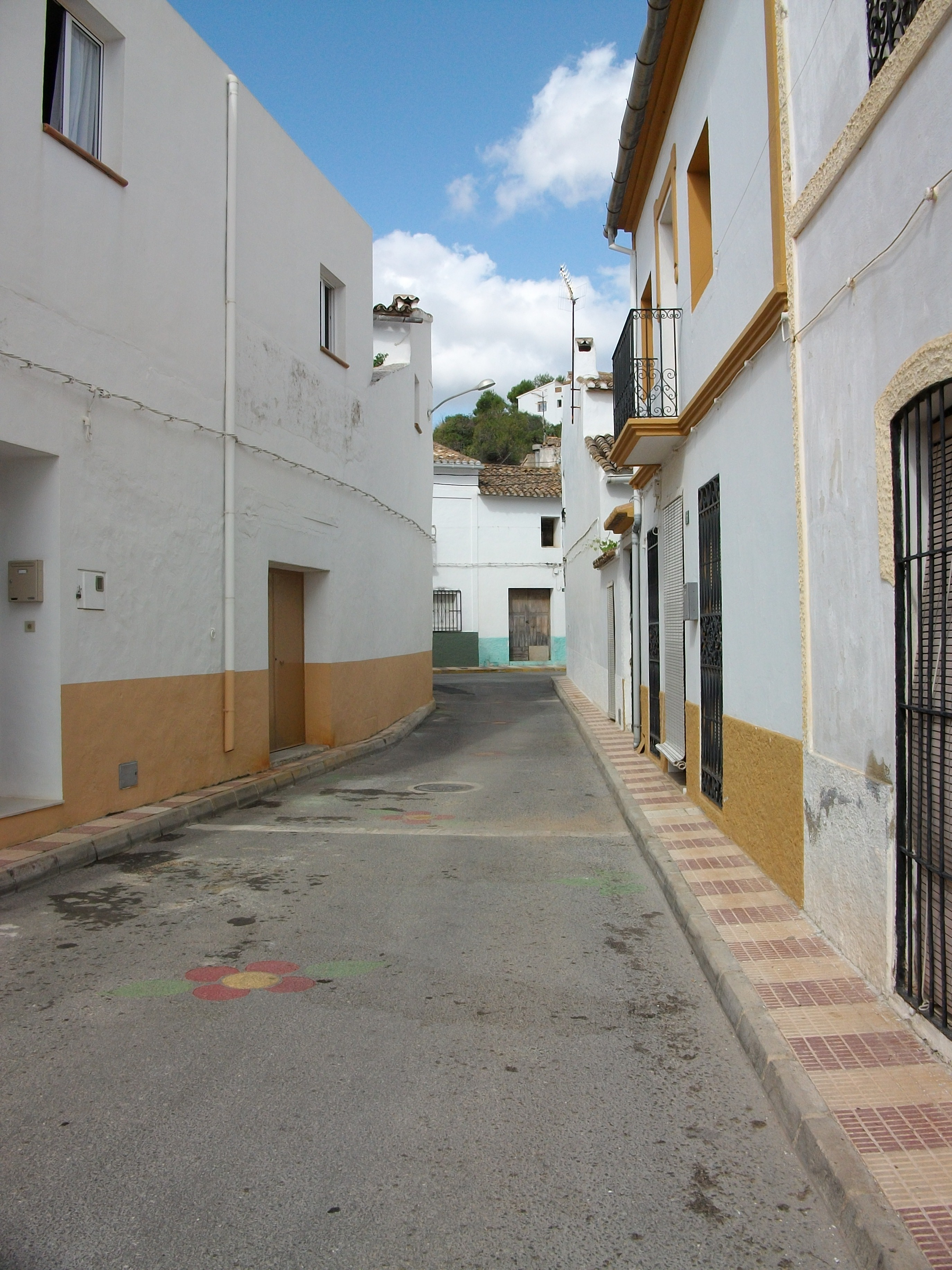

Senija's coat of arms

Senija is a village in the province of Alicante and autonomous community of Valencia, Spain. The municipality covers an area of 4.8 square kilometres (1.9 sq mi) and as of 2011 had a population of 661 people.

== Geography ==
Senija is stretched out at the foot of a small mountain, so it looks like a continuation of the mountainside. The municipality's terrain is uneven.

It is located on the left bank of the Autovía A-7 (also known as the Autovía del Mediterráneo), from which you can access the town by taking the exit at Benisa. It is also connected by the CV-750 road which, from Parcent, passes through Alcalalí and Jalón.

== History ==
The history of Senija has been linked to Benissa, a nearby town. In the 16th century it was populated exclusively by Moors; until 1535, when it was annexed to the parish of Benissa. Little is known about its town charter after the expulsion of the Moriscos, but in 1622 it had a population of 33 Christian families, a significantly lower number than in the last years of the Moorish period, showing the economic damage suffered due to the expulsion. In the 17th century it belonged to the Zapata family, who were merchants and knights. In 1794 it had 121 families who were mainly engaged in the production of raisins destined for export. In recent decades, its population has significantly decreased.

== Economy ==
Senija's economy is based on agriculture - citrus fruits, carob trees, almonds, and most importantly, vineyards that produce the famous raisins dried in the sun of La Marina County [ca] that have brought the town wealth. The municipality also produces oil, dessert wines and dried tomatoes. The proximity to the coast has allowed the arrival of tourists, who come to Senija to eat at the restaurants there.

== Demographics ==
It has a population of 658 inhabitants (INE 2007). 37.80% of the residents in Senija are not Spanish citizens, and are mainly from other countries in the European Union.

== Government and politics ==
Makeup of the Municipal Government The City Council Plenum is made up of 7 councilors. In the municipal elections of 26 May 2019, 4 councilors were elected from Coalició Compromís (Compromís per Senija) and 3 from the Popular Party.
