= El Ràfol d'Almúnia =

- Municipality
- Flag Coat of arms

- Location in Spain
- Coordinates: 38°49′13″N 0°3′11″W
- Country: Spain
- Autonomous community: Valencian Community
- Province: Alicante
- Comarca: Marina Alta
- Judicial district: Dénia

Government
  - Alcalde: Alejandro Pastor Furió (2007) (PP)

Area
  - Total: 4.90 km^{2} (1.89 sq mi)
- Elevation: 88 m (289 ft)

Population (2025-01-01)
  - Total: 734
  - Density: 150/km^{2} (388/sq mi)
- Demonym(s): Rafolenc, rafolenca
- Time zone: UTC+1 (CET)
  - Summer (DST): UTC+2 (CEST)
- Postal code: 03769
- Official language(s): Valencian
- Website: Official website

El Ràfol d'Almúnia (Valencian: [el ˈrafol dalˈmunia]; Spanish: Ráfol de Almunia [ˈrafol dalˈmunja]) is a municipality in the comarca of Marina Alta in the Valencian Community, Spain.

It is situated in the northern part of the province of Alicante, and numbers some 635 inhabitants according to the 2007 Spanish National Census (INE).

== History ==
El Ràfol d'Almúnia has Arab origins. It belonged to King Taifas of Dénia, but under the conquest of James I, control passed to the Crown of Aragon and their local ruling families, first the Murs, then the Sapenas and later the Almúnia. In 1535, it was elevated to parish status with the appointment of the first parish priest D. Antonio Aringo, whose control also encompassed the sub-parishes of Benimeli, Sagra, Negrals and Zeneta. After the expulsion of the moors, El Ràfol was repopulated in 1610 by 123 inhabitants occupying 26 houses. In 1800 it had grown to 80 houses with 429 inhabitants. The parish church of Sant Francesc de Paula was served by a priest and an assistant whose ministry also took in Benimeli, Negrals, Sagra, Sanet and Tormos. In the 17th century, El Ràfol lay at the centre of the area now known as the Rectoria, and also at the heart of the territory ruled by the Marquess of El Ràfol d'Almúnia. In 1693, Ràfol's neighbour, Francesc Garcia, acquired fame through his oppression of feudalism in the Marina Alta.

== Demographics ==
It has a population of 635 inhabitants.
