= Muhammad al-Azraq =

Arab military commander

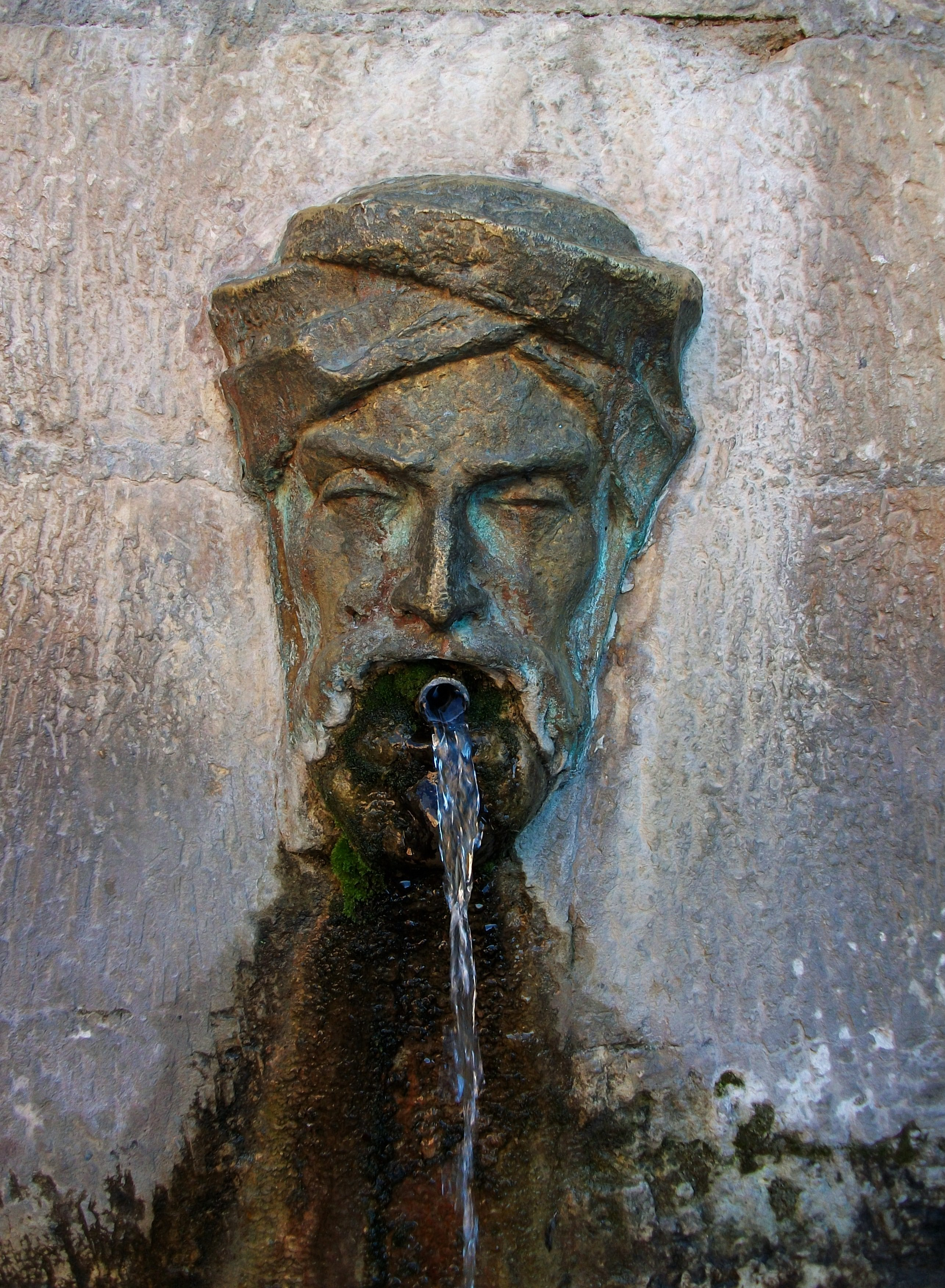
Al-Azraq, Alcalà de la Jovada, Marina Alta

Abu 'Abd Allah Muhammad ibn Hudhayl al-Saghir (Arabic: أبو عبد الله محمد بن هذيل الصغير) (1208 in la Vall d'Alcalà, Alicante – 1276 Alcoi), popularly known as Al-Azraq (الأزرق, 'the Blue' – referring to his eyes), was an Arab Moorish commander in the Iberian Peninsula in the south of the Kingdom of Valencia.

After the conquest of the Kingdom of Valencia by James I of Aragon, Al-Azraq signed the Al-Azraq Treaty of 1245, a pact with the Aragonese king by which the Muslim commander could keep control of a series of fortifications including Polop (later the lordship of the Barons of Polop) in the valleys of Alcalá and Gallinera.

== See also ==
- Moors and Christians of Alcoy
