= Els Poblets =

- Municipality
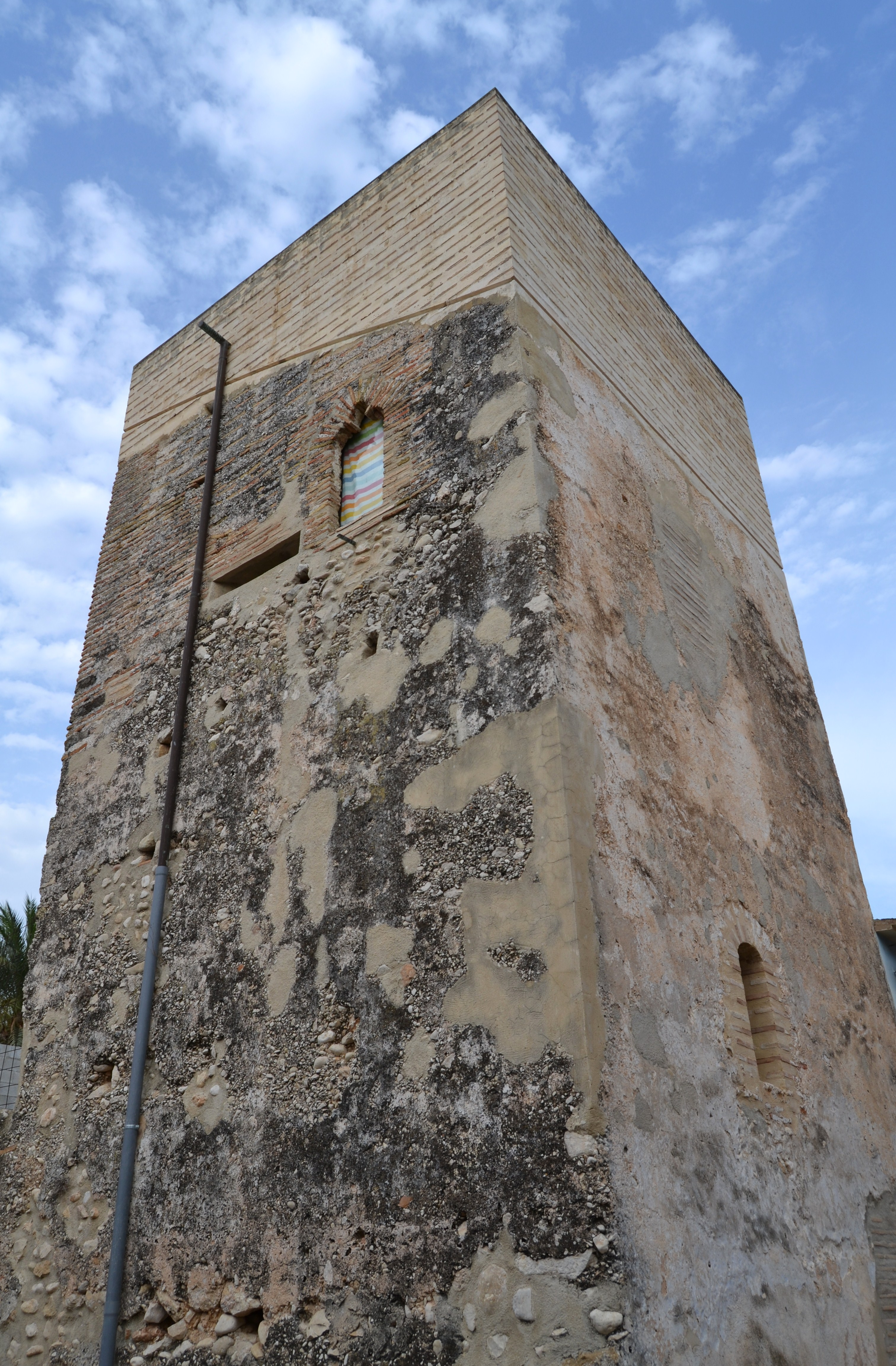
- Torre de Mira-rosa in Els Poblets.

- Coat of arms

- Location of Els Poblets. Els Poblets (Valencian Community)
- Country: Spain
- Community: Valencian Community
- Province: Alicante
- Comarca: Marina Alta

Area
  - Total: 3.68 km^{2} (1.42 sq mi)

Population (2023)
  - Total: 2,763
  - Density: 751/km^{2} (1,940/sq mi)
- Time zone: UTC+1 (CET)
  - Summer (DST): UTC+2 (CEST)
- Postal code: 03779
- Website: www.elspoblets.es

Els Poblets (Valencian: [els poˈblets]), also known as Setla, Mira-rosa i Miraflor, is a municipality in the Valencian Community, Spain. It is situated in the north of the province of Alicante. The population is 2,763 (INE 2023).

== Geography ==
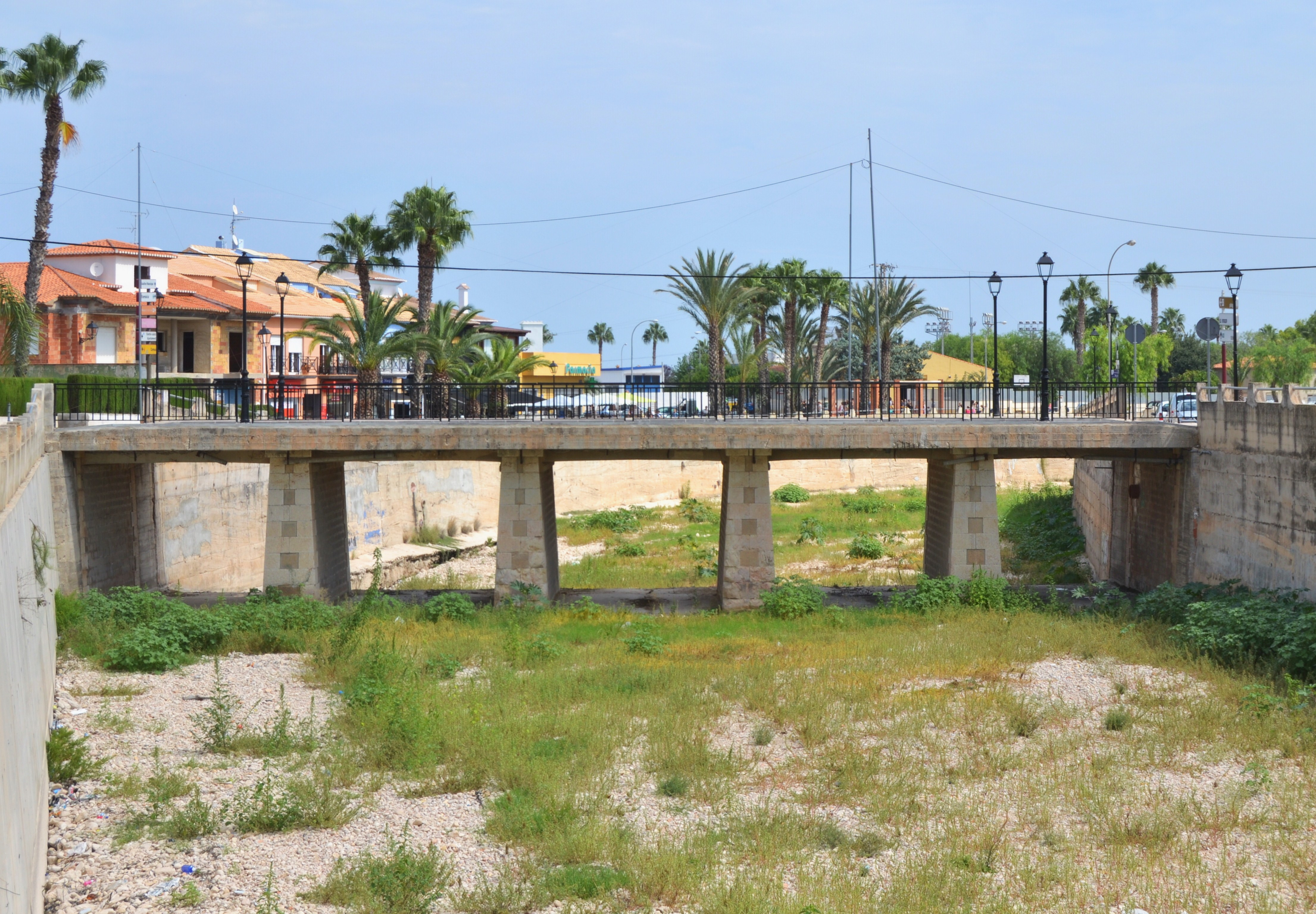
The bridge over the river Girona

Els Poblets is located in a plain formed by alluvial soils of the Girona river. It spans about 1 km (0.62 mi) of coastline on the Mediterranean and contains the beach of Almadraba.

The municipality is bordered by Denia and El Verger.

The average temperature ranges from 11 degrees in January to 25 in July, the average rainfall is 600 mm a year.

== History ==
Although els Poblets has its origin in an old farm founded after the Muslim conquest, which was later incorporated into the Christian domain of Dénia, there are remains of older populations. In the Roman site of Almadrava several houses belonging to a pottery were found, along with clay deposits, workshops and rooms for the workers.

Towards the 16th century Miraflor was owned by the lords of Perpignan. It subsequently became the home of the Cardona noblemen. It was a place inhabited by moriscos, which in 1609 had a total of 85 houses, after their expulsion a repopulation with people from Mallorca was carried out.

Mira-rosa and Miraflor merged into one single municipality in 1971. On November 12 of 1991, by Decree 216/91 of the Council of the Generalitat Valenciana, it was agreed to change the name of the town to els Poblets, as it was popularly known.
