= Central comarques of the Valencian Community =

Location of the Central comarques of the Valencian Country

The central comarques of the Valencian Community, or Valencian Country, is a region of the Valencia Autonomous Community conterminous with the historical territory of the Governor of Xàtiva and the Province of Xàtiva. In modern times it comprises the comarques of Costera, Canal de Navarres, Vall d'Albaida, les Marines (Marina Alta and Marina Baixa), Comtat and Alcoià.

The central comarques do not belong to any unitarian administration, however in 2015 the Social and Economic Council of the Valencian Central Comarques was created to advance in the integration of the territory.
