= La Vall d'Ebo =

- Municipality
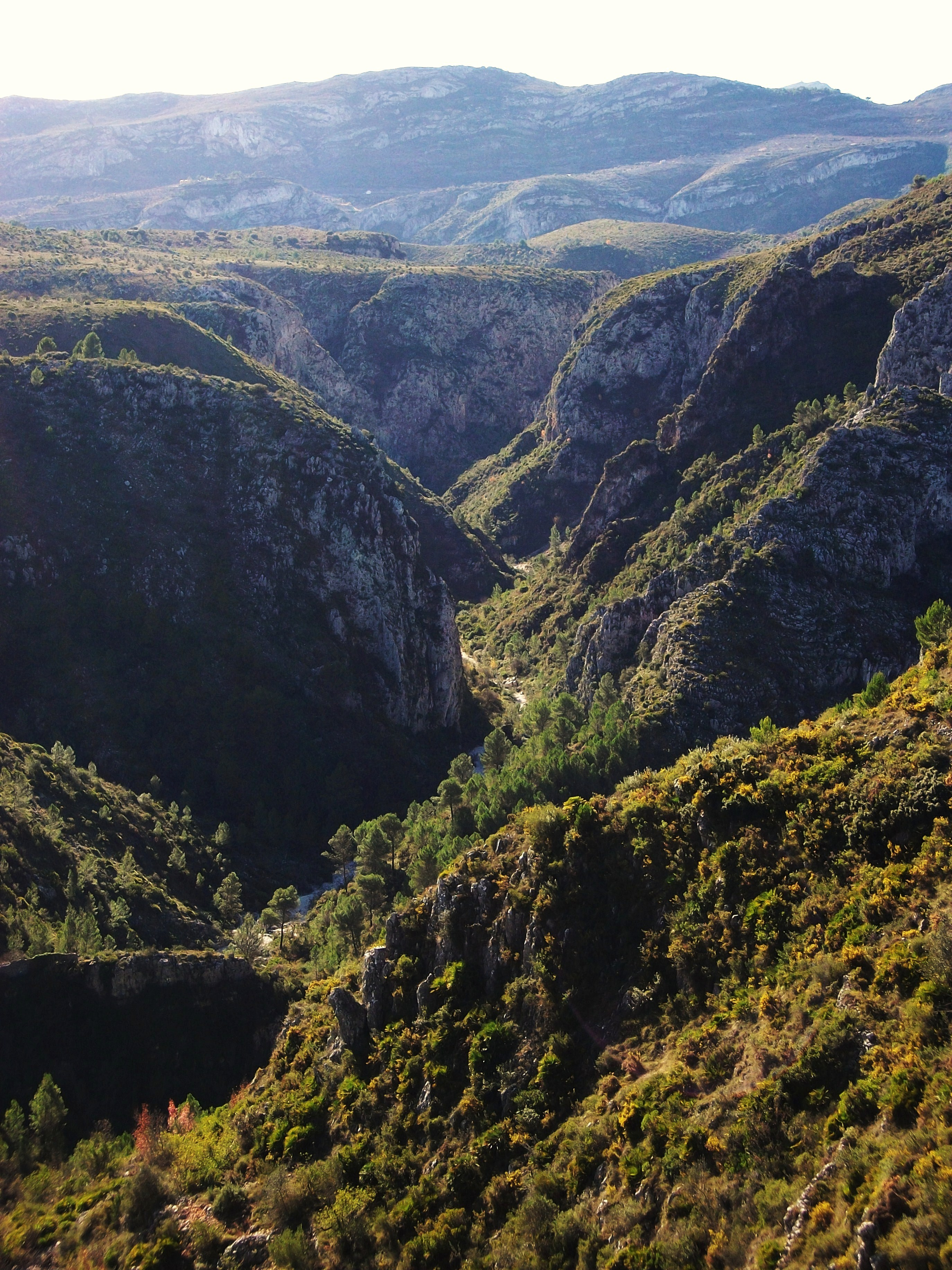

- Flag Coat of arms

- Location within Spain Location within Valencian Community Location within Europe
- Coordinates: 38°48′20″N 0°09′33″W
- Country: Spain
- Autonomous Community: Valencian Community
- Province: Alicante
- Comarca: Marina Alta

Government
  - Type: Mayor-council government
  - Body: Ajuntament de La Vall d'Ebo
  - Mayor: Rafael Llodrá Masanet (2007) (PSPV-PSOE)

Area
  - Total: 32.40 km^{2} (12.51 sq mi)
- Elevation: 394 m (1,293 ft)

Population (2025-01-01)
  - Total: 231
  - Density: 7.13/km^{2} (18.5/sq mi)
- Demonym(s): Ebolino, -na (es) ebolí, ina (va)
- Time zone: CET (GMT +1)
  - Summer (DST): CEST (GMT +2)
- Postcode: 03789
- Website: City Hall of La Vall d'Ebo

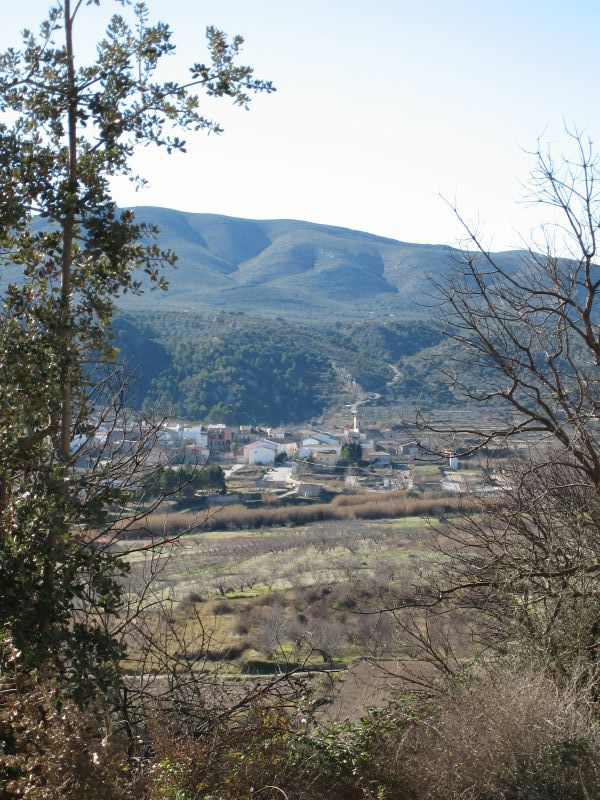

La Vall d'Ebo is a municipality in the province of Alicante and autonomous community of Valencia, Spain. The municipality covers an area of 32.4 square kilometres (12.5 sq mi) and as of 2011 had a population of 284 people.
