= Beniarbeig =

- Municipality
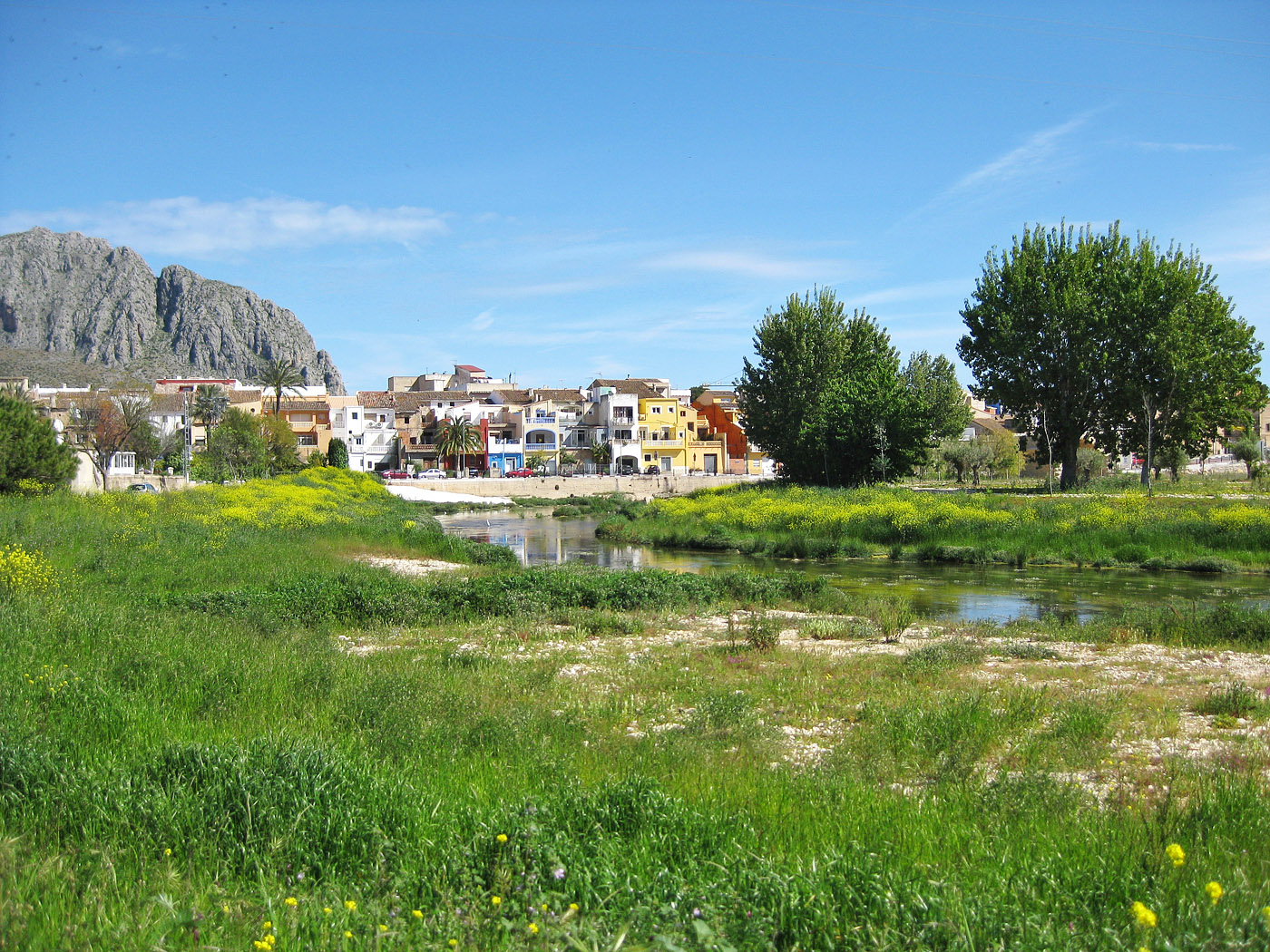
- The view of Beniarbeig and the river Girona

- Flag Coat of arms

- Location in Spain
- Coordinates: 38°49′18″N 0°0′6″W
- Country: Spain
- Autonomous community: Valencian Community
- Province: Alicante
- Comarca: Marina Alta (comarca)
- Judicial district: Dénia

Government
  - Alcalde: Luis Gil Pastor (2007) (PSOE)

Area
  - Total: 7.40 km^{2} (2.86 sq mi)
- Elevation: 42 m (138 ft)

Population (2025-01-01)
  - Total: 2,499
  - Density: 338/km^{2} (875/sq mi)
- Demonym(s): beniarbegí, -ina (Val.) beniarbegino, -a (Sp.)
- Time zone: UTC+1 (CET)
  - Summer (DST): UTC+2 (CEST)
- Postal code: 03778
- Official language(s): Valencian; Spanish
- Website: Official website

Beniarbeig (Valencian: [beniaɾˈbetʃ]; Spanish: [benjaɾˈβejɣ], also [benjaɾˈβetʃ]) is a municipality in the comarca of Marina Alta in the Valencian Community, Spain.
