= Gata de Gorgos =

Municipality of Spain

Coordinates: 38°46′N 0°05′E

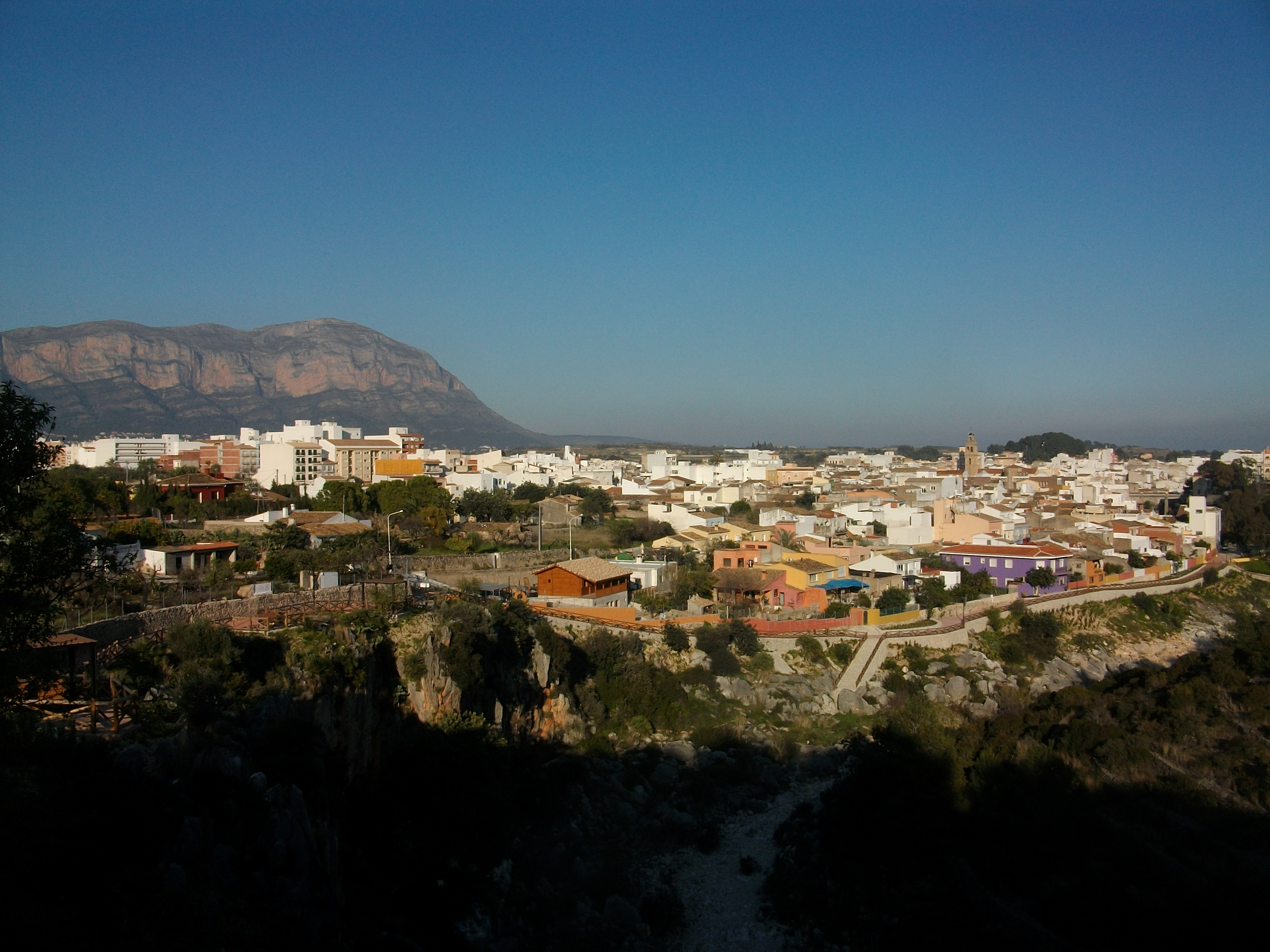
Gata de Gorgos seen from Coves Roges, with the Montgó mountain in the background

Gata de Gorgos's coat of arms

Gata de Gorgos (Valencian: [ˈɡata ðe ˈɣoɾɣos], Spanish: [ˈɡata ðe ˈɣoɾɣos]) is a village in the Marina Alta region of the north Costa Blanca in Spain. It has a population of 5,325 (2005).

The village is known for its wicker industry and for having an unusually large number of bars and restaurants per capita. Boasting over 30 bars, the most popular are Ca Corder, which is located in the church square, and Ca Patrics, which is located in the Placa Nuevo.

The town's key fiestas take place during July to honour The Christ of the Calvary.(Fiestas en honor al Santísimo Cristo del Calvario). A key part of this event includes bull running along the street known as Paseo de Alicante - another is when the town's young men and women who are 'coming of age' form groups called 'Quintos' and march through the town accompanied by music and watched by family and friends. The highlight to many is the Paella Night, where most of the town congregate in the school to cook paella in the open air before being entertained by a local band.
