= Sanet i els Negrals =

Sanet i els Negrals's coat of arms

Sanet i els Negrals is a village in the province of Alicante and autonomous community of Valencia, Spain. The municipality covers an area of 21.1 square kilometres (8.1 sq mi) and as of 2011 had a population of 717 people.
