= Benimeli =

- Municipality
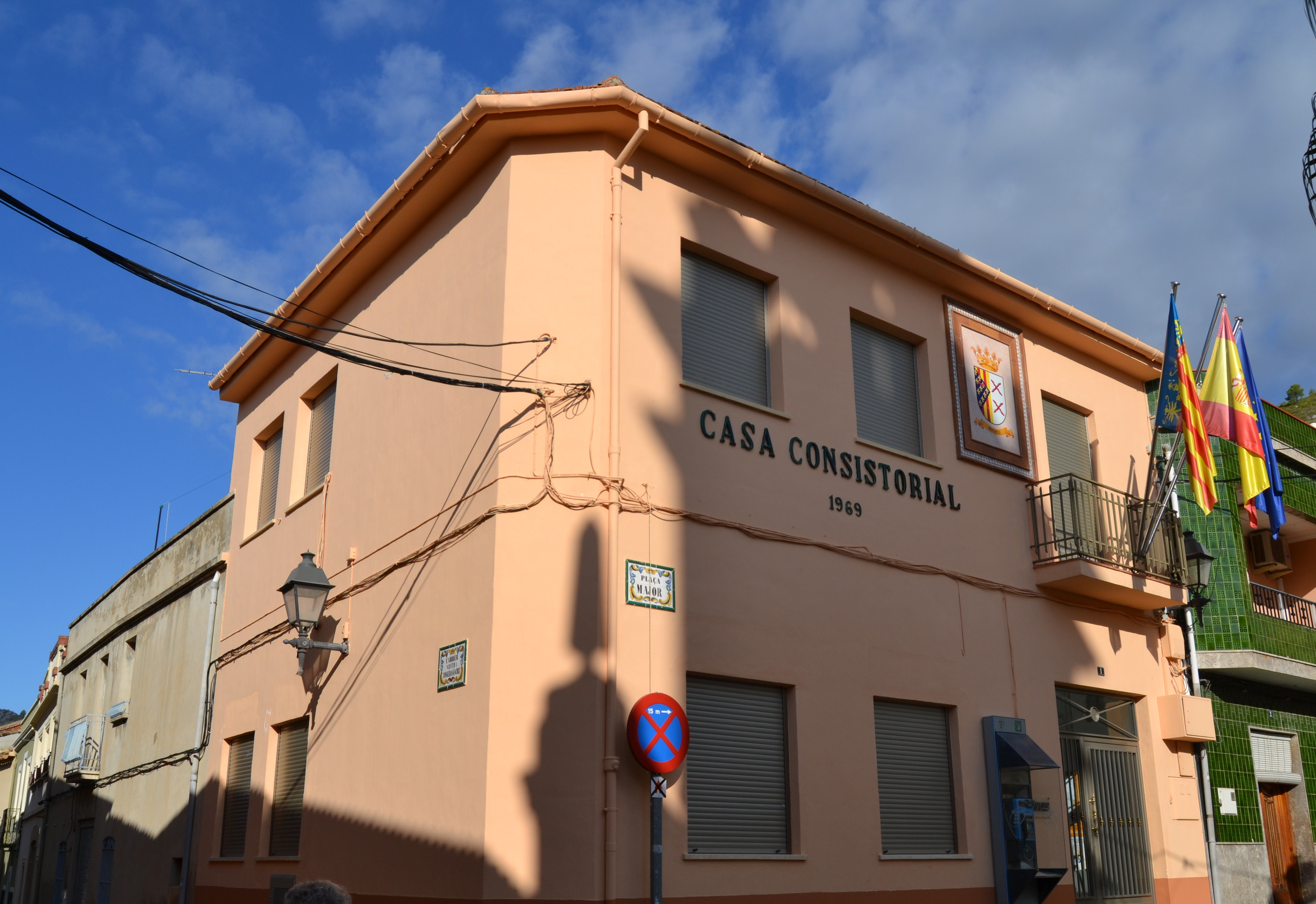
- Town hall

- Coat of arms

- Location in Spain
- Coordinates: 38°49′22″N 0°02′29″W
- Country: Spain
- Autonomous community: Valencian Community
- Province: Alicante
- Comarca: Marina Alta
- Judicial district: Dénia

Government
  - Alcalde: Rosa Ana Perelló Lull (2007) (PP)

Area
  - Total: 3.5 km^{2} (1.4 sq mi)
- Elevation: 95 m (312 ft)

Population (2025-01-01)
  - Total: 474
  - Density: 140/km^{2} (350/sq mi)
- Demonym(s): Benimelí, benimelina
- Time zone: UTC+1 (CET)
  - Summer (DST): UTC+2 (CEST)
- Postal code: 03769
- Official language(s): Valencian

Benimeli (Valencian: [beniˈmɛli], Spanish: [beniˈmeli]) is a municipality in the comarca of Marina Alta in the Valencian Community, Spain.
