= Parcent =

- Village
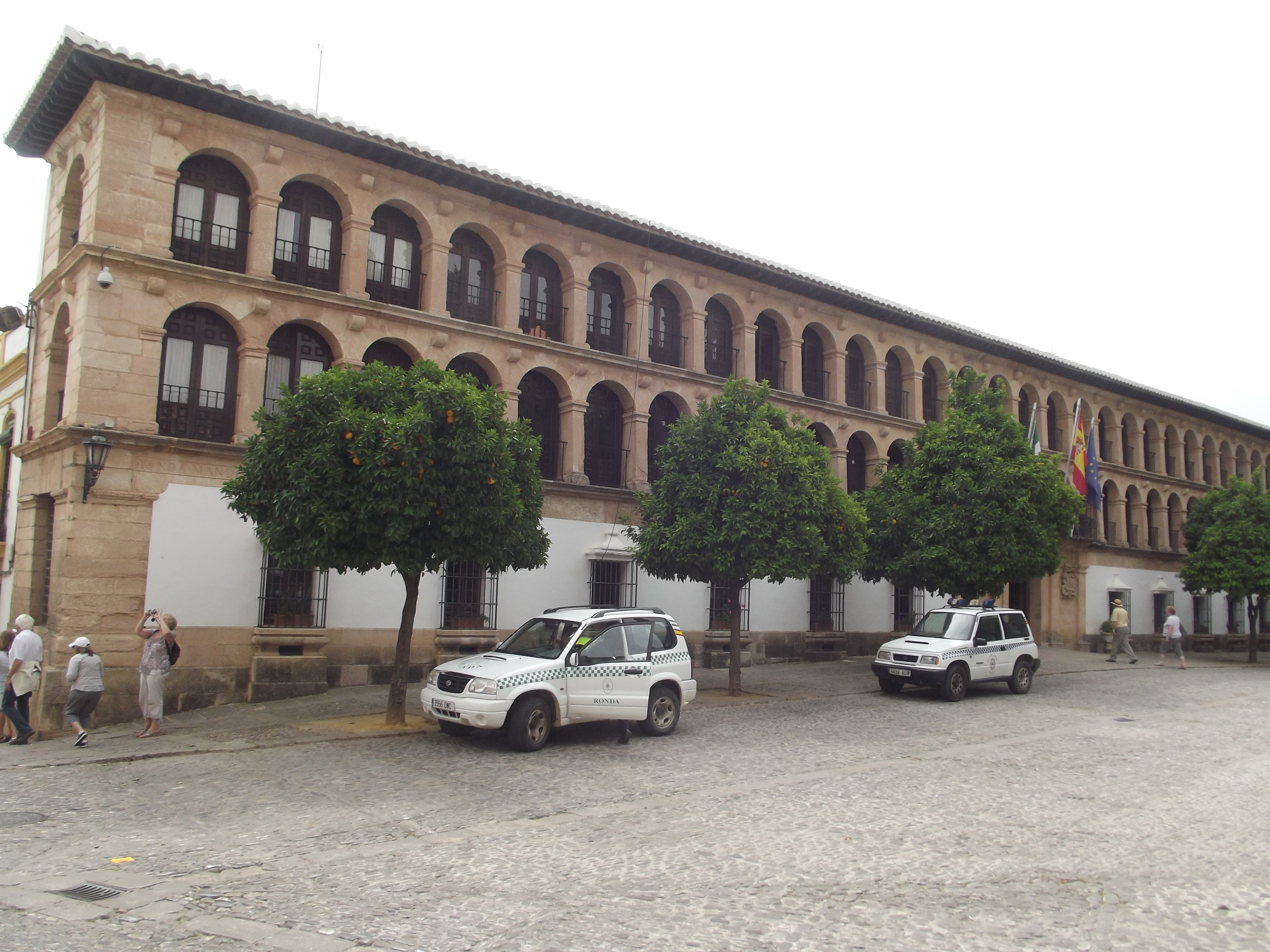
- Town hall

- Coat of arms

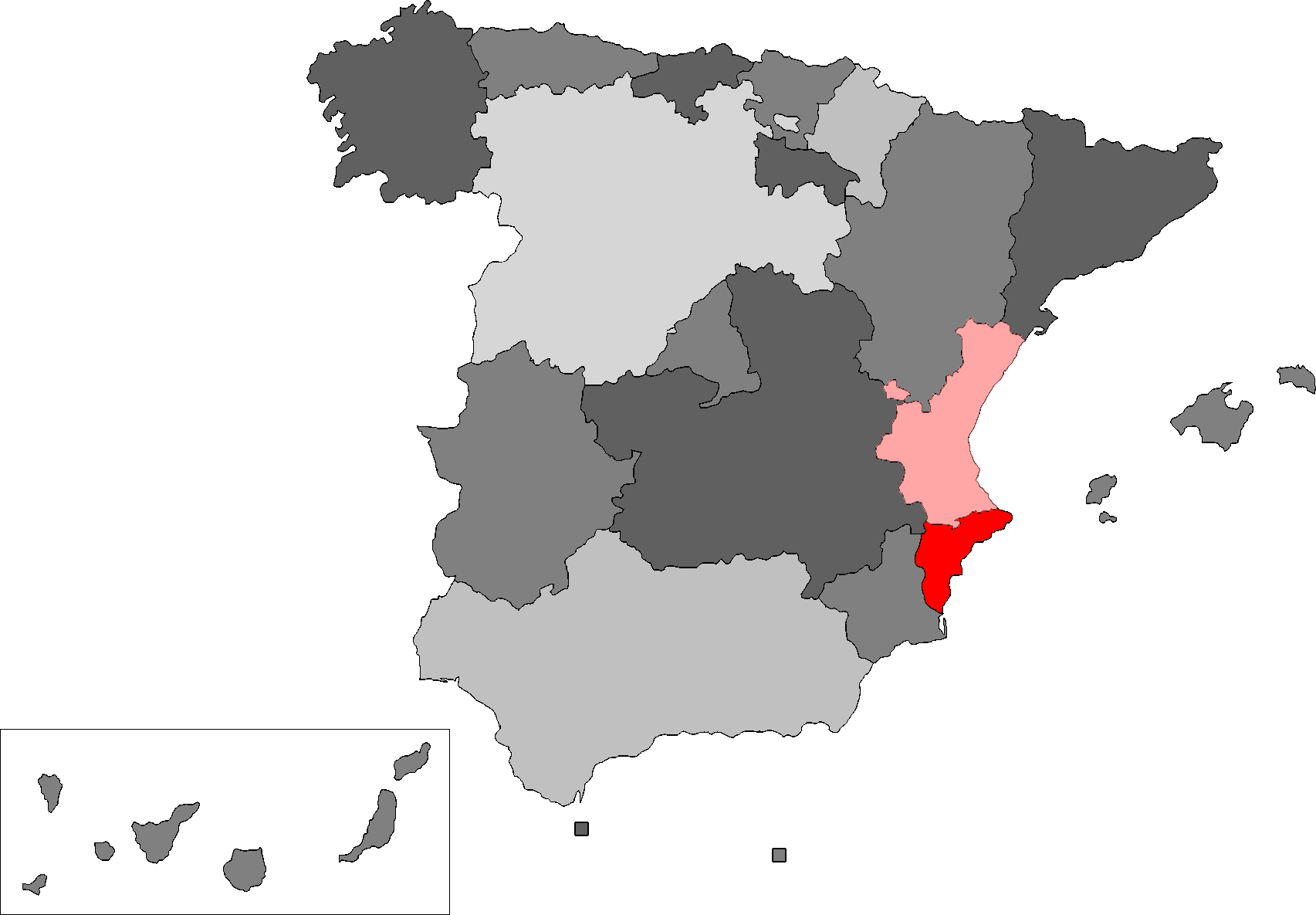
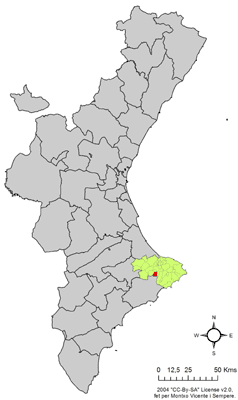
- Location in the Valencian Community, Spain

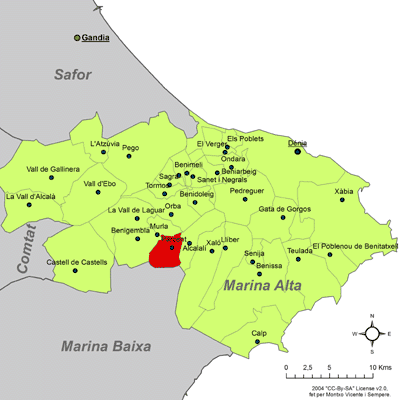
- Location in the comarca Marina Alta
- Coordinates: 38°44′N 00°03′E
- Country: Spain
- Province: Alicante
- Comarca: Marina Alta

Government
  - Mayor: Máximo Revilla

Area
  - Total: 11.8 km^{2} (4.6 sq mi)
- Elevation: 295 m (968 ft)

Population (2025-01-01)
  - Total: 1,037
  - Density: 87.9/km^{2} (228/sq mi)
  - Language: Spanish
- Demonym(s): Parcent (Spanish); Parcent (Valenciano)
- Time zone: CET (GMT +1)
  - Summer (DST): CEST (GMT +2)
- Postcode: 03792
- Market Days: Monday
- Website: http://www.parcent.es/ www.veinsdeparcent.info
- festivals = Fiestas of San Antonio Abad, which features a pilgrimage and blessing of the animals, in January; Carnival, in February; San Vicente Ferrer Festival, in April; San Lorenzo Festival, in August

Parcent (Valencian: [paɾˈsent]; Spanish: [paɾˈθent]) is a municipality in the Pop Valley of La Marina Alta in the Alicante Province, which is located in the Valencian region of Spain. Parcent has a population of about 1100 and is about one hour's drive north of the city of Alicante, and about an hour's drive south of the city of Valencia.

It features the small Holy Virgin church, and is surrounded by hills and mountains. Writer Gabriel Miró (1879–1930) was a resident of Parcent and called it a "paradise between the mountains".

It is also close to Jalón (written as Xaló in Catalan), which is known for its wine production and markets. The traditional economy of Parcent relies on almond and orange farming in the surrounding area.

== History ==
The name "Parcent" is of Latin origin. Later, it was a Moorish town until the forces of James I of Aragon conquered it in 1256 CE.

There was a major outbreak of leprosy in Parcent in 1850 and by 1887 20% of the residents of Parcent were afflicted. This apparently motivated the inclusion of passages about the disease in Miró's two so-called "Oleza" novels.

== Demographics ==
The 2006 census established that Parcent's population was 1,019 inhabitants. It was also revealed that about 35.10% of the population of Parcent were not Spanish citizens but were in fact incomers from other countries within the European Union.

Historical population

Year	Pop.	±% p.a.
1857	1,223	—
1887	1,415	+0.49%
1900	1,192	−1.31%
1910	978	−1.96%
1920	935	−0.45%

Year	Pop.	±% p.a.
1930	801	−1.53%
1940	889	+1.05%
1950	793	−1.14%
1960	728	−0.85%
1970	678	−0.71%

Year	Pop.	±% p.a.
1981	619	−0.82%
1991	717	+1.48%
2000	857	+2.00%
2005	960	+2.30%
2006	1,019	+6.15%

== Controversy ==
Many Europeans from other areas have built retirement or second homes in Parcent, mainly due to the sunshine and proximity to the beaches. However, Parcent and the surrounding valley are suffering growing pains as development quickens.

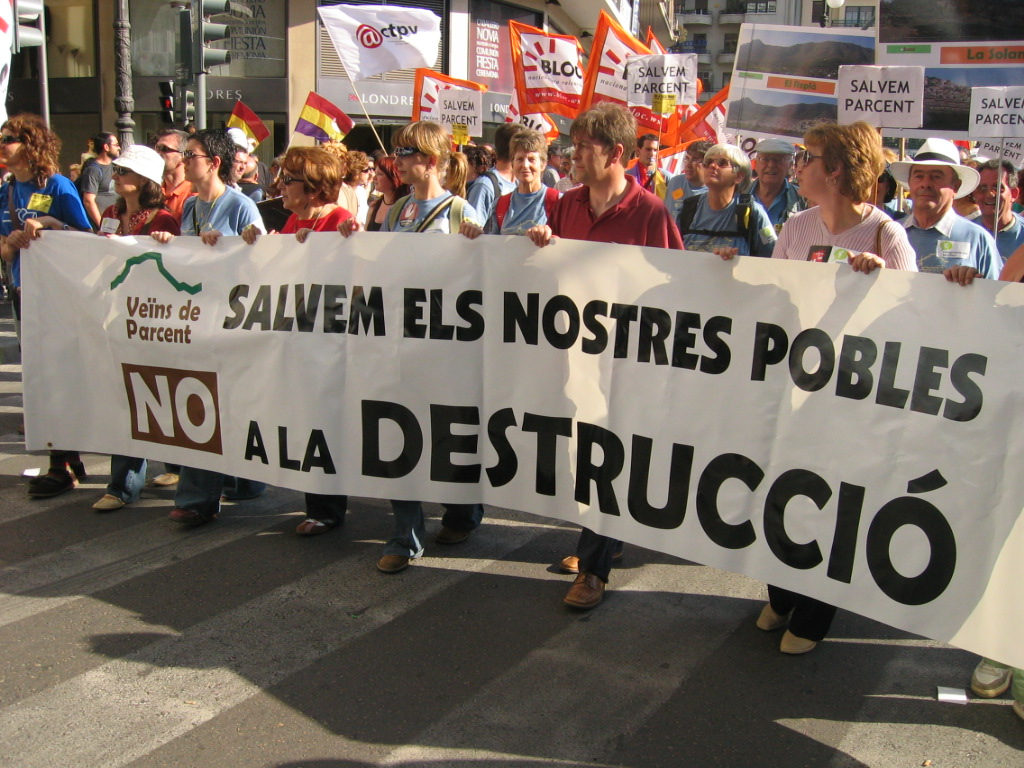
Protest marchers in Parcent concerned about growth plans
