= La Vall de Gallinera =

- Municipality
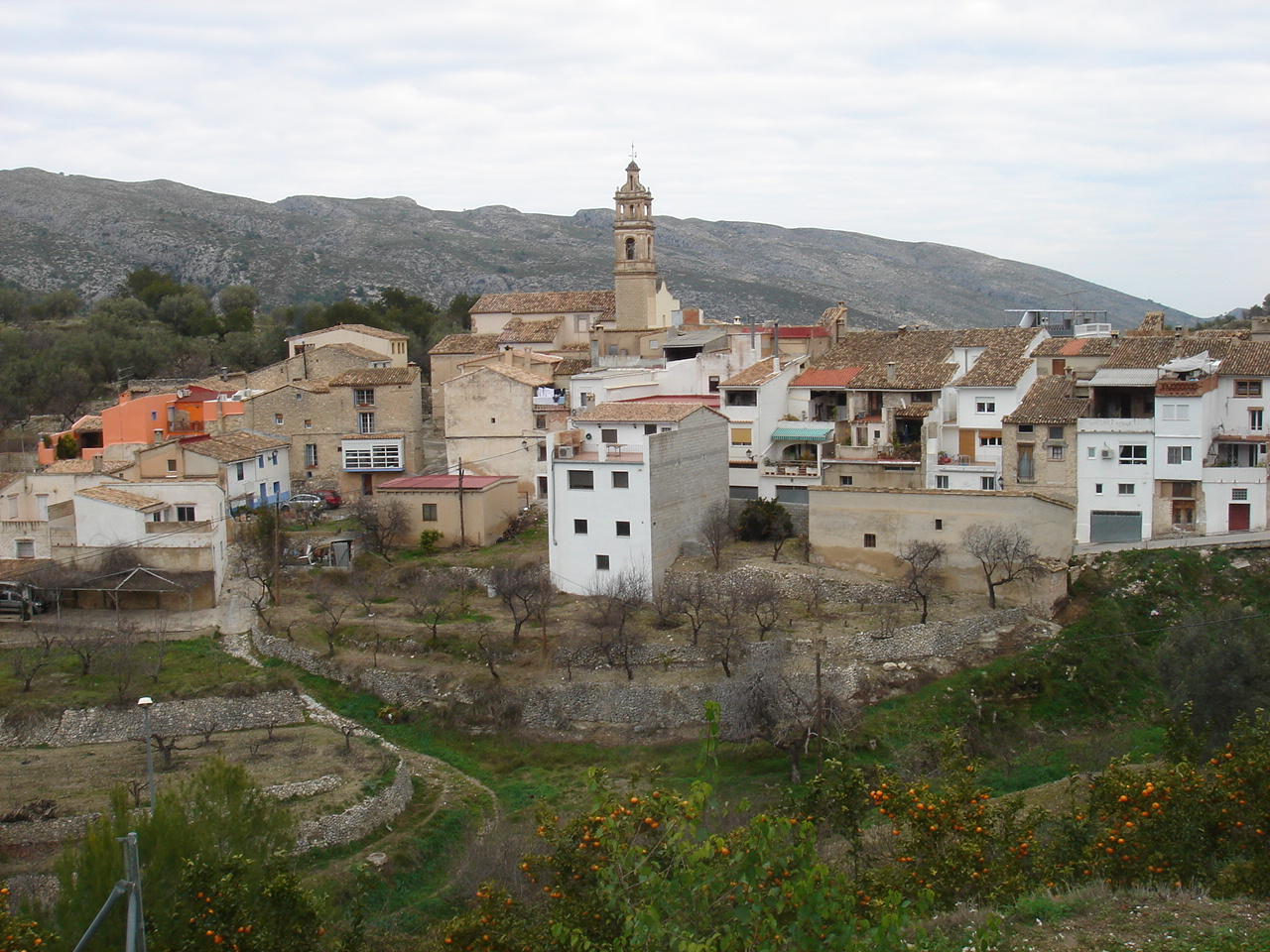

- Flag Coat of arms

- Location within Province of Alicante Location within Valencian Community Location within Spain
- Coordinates: 38°49′20″N 0°13′20″W
- Country: Spain
- Autonomous Community: Valencian Community
- Province: Alicante
- Comarca: Marina Alta

Government
  - Type: Mayor-council government
  - Body: Ajuntament de La Vall de Gallinera
  - Mayor: Antonio Gil Pardo (2015) (GPV)

Area
  - Total: 53.60 km^{2} (20.70 sq mi)
- Elevation: 295 m (968 ft)

Population (2025-01-01)
  - Total: 583
  - Density: 10.9/km^{2} (28.2/sq mi)
- Demonym(s): Vallero, -ra (es) valler, ra (va)
- Time zone: CET (GMT +1)
  - Summer (DST): CEST (GMT +2)
- Postcode: 03789
- Website: City Hall of La Vall de Gallinera

La Vall de Gallinera is a valley and a municipality in north-east Alicante, Spain, included in the Marina Alta comarca. It is formed by the nuclei of Benirrama, Benialí, Benissivà, Benitaia, Carroja, Alpatró, Llombai and Benissili. All these settlements constitute a single municipality. The total combined population at the moment is around 600.

== History ==
Like in all other valleys of the interior of Marina Alta, the Moors occupied the territory for almost six centuries. After the expulsion of the Moriscos in 1609, the Vall de Gallinera became deserted and the Duke of Gandia, to whom this area was given, brought from Mallorca 150 families to repopulate the valley. As per Cavanilles: "it is easy still to see the origin of all of them in the accent and dialect of its inhabitants. They are very hard working, all they take advantage of it and they live contentedly in that delicious enclosure." Indeed, in this valley, Valencian is heavily influenced by Balearic Catalan.

== Economy ==
The main businesses of the area are the cultivation of cherries, almonds and olives, and rural tourism.

== Sources ==
- Ayuntamiento de Vall de Gallinera (in Spanish)
- Índice estadístico municipal de Vall de Gallinera. Unidad de Documentación de la Diputación de Alicante (in Spanish)
- Portal Interactivo de Vall de Gallinera (in Spanish)
- Web de Vall de Gallinera (in Spanish)
