= Benidoleig =

- Municipality
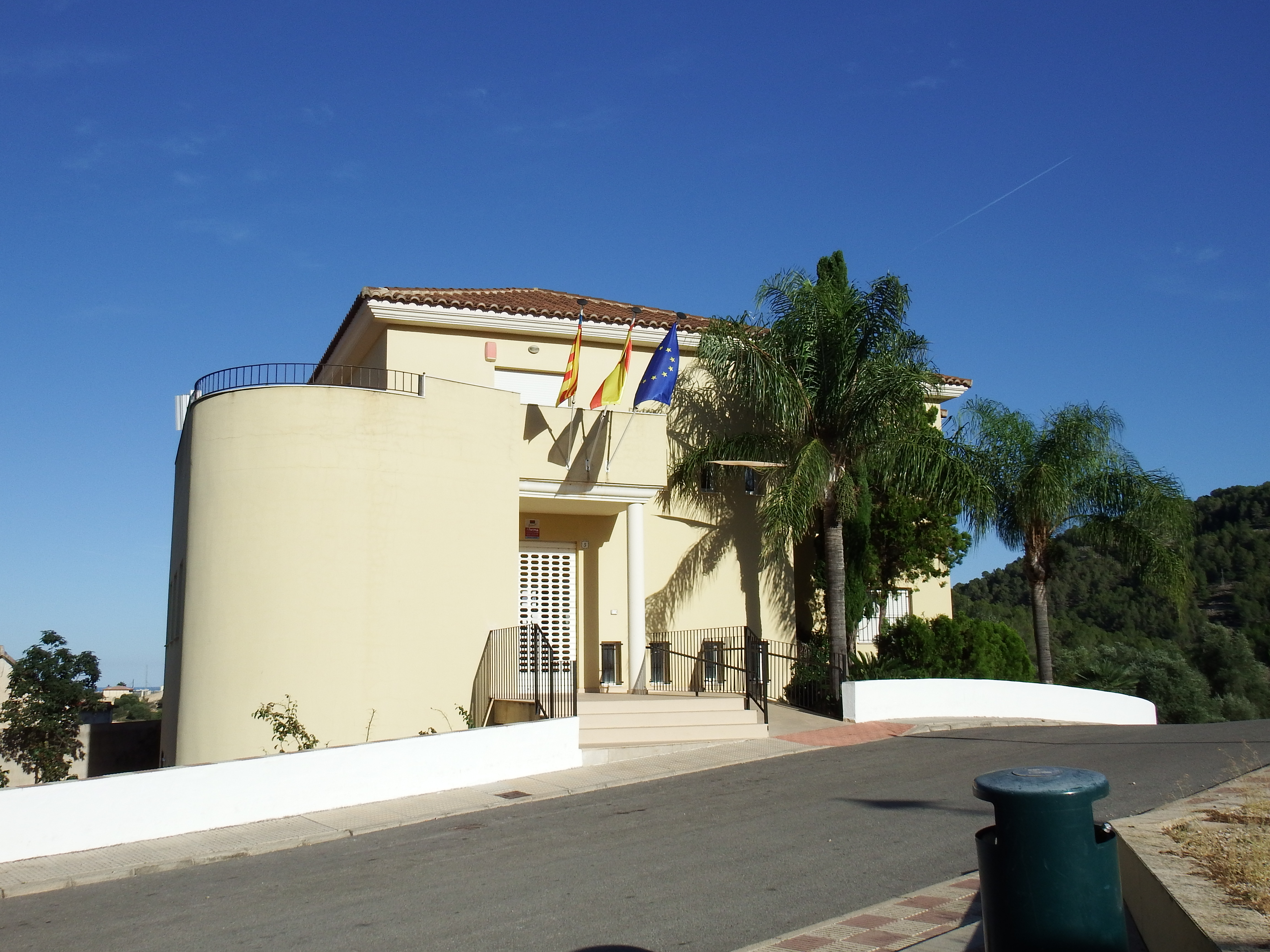
- Town hall

- Coat of arms

- Location in Spain
- Coordinates: 38°47′30″N 0°01′57″W
- Country: Spain
- Autonomous community: Valencian Community
- Province: Alicante
- Comarca: Marina Alta
- Judicial district: Dénia

Government
  - Alcalde: Josep-Vicent Pons i Peris (2007) (BNV)

Area
  - Total: 7.48 km^{2} (2.89 sq mi)
- Elevation: 131 m (430 ft)

Population (2025-01-01)
  - Total: 1,245
  - Density: 166/km^{2} (431/sq mi)
- Demonym(s): benidolejà, -ana (Val.) benidolejano, -a (Sp.)
- Time zone: UTC+1 (CET)
  - Summer (DST): UTC+2 (CEST)
- Postal code: 03759
- Official language(s): Valencian; Spanish

Benidoleig (Valencian: [beniðoˈletʃ]; Spanish: [beniðoˈlejɣ], also [beniðoˈletʃ]) is a municipality in the comarca of Marina Alta in the Valencian Community, Spain.

Benidoleig is located in the Girona Valley of the Marina Alta area in Spain's Costa Blanca. Among the various amenities within the village is a junior/infant school, nursery school (local authority run), medical centre, post office (open 1 hour per day), supermarket, tobacconist/newsagents, hardware store, curtain shop, hairdresser, estate agent/sign shop, printers, bank, pharmacy and various Spanish bars. The village is also well catered with a Spanish restaurant and an International restaurant.

There is a large expatriate community in Benidoleig but it has not spoilt the essence of the village as incomers have integrated easily within the Spanish community.

The village hosts a small market on Thursday mornings, where fresh fruit & veg, meat & fish, and clothes, shoes and general household items can be purchased.

There is no public transport in the village.

The nearest large supermarket is in neighbouring town of Ondara, some 6 km away.
