= Pego, Spain =

Pego
- Municipality
- Coat of arms
- Interactive map of Pego
- Coordinates: 38°50.5′N 0°7′W
- Country: Spain
- Province: Alicante

Area
  - Total: 5,285 km^{2} (2,041 sq mi)

Population (2025-01-01)
  - Total: 10,791
  - Density: 2.042/km^{2} (5.288/sq mi)
- Postal code: 03780
- Website: www.pego.org

Pego (Valencian and Spanish: [ˈpeɣo]) is a municipality located in the province of Alicante, Spain.

Lying just inland from the northern Costa Blanca resort of Dénia, the town of Pego sits in a depression, surrounded by mountains. A part of the Marina Alta comarca of Alicante, Pego has a population of 10,721 (2006) and a history dating from the Arab occupation. The region around Pego was settled during the Bronze Age and later by Iberian and Roman civilizations, though the story of the town really begins during the times of the Moors in around 726, when Pego was an important Arab enclave which later formed part of the Taifa of Dénia. Subsequently, conquered by forces under James I of Aragon in 1244, Pego was later repopulated with peasants from Catalonia and the barony of Pego was created in 1262, and control of the town passed through the hands of various members of the Valencian nobility.

== Geography ==
Pego is situated on an alluvial plain. It is surrounded by 200 m high hills to the North and South and 600 m high mountains to the West, which give rise to several creeks draining Northeastward into the Mediterranean Sea: the Barranc de Mixel to the North and the Barranc de Beniganim to the South. Two feeders of these creeks touch the outskirts of the town: the Barranc de la Horta and the Barranc de la Quintanella on its Northwestern part and the Barranc de Benituba flows through Pego´s southeastern end.

The nearest town to the North on the CV-715 is Oliva. On the CV-700 to the East lies El Verger with its 400 m high Segària mountain range, and further East, 20 km away from Pego is Dénia.

== History ==
During the late 13th century the wetlands between Pego and Oliva were developed for the production of rice, fishing and grazing, rice in particular became an important source of income, though later rice production in the wetlands was banned by Martin I (1403) and attempts were made to regulate the cultivation of the wetlands. The final expulsion of remaining moriscos (Moors converted to Christianity) occurred in 1609 and Pego became virtually deserted for some time.

In the late 18th century certain areas of the wetlands were further developed, beginning with the formation of drainage ditches in the outer sections, though rice production did not return until 1805 when a Royal Order allowed the crop to be grown once more, significant areas were transformed between 1820 and 1840 though much of the wetlands remained untouched. The cultivation of rice continued to increase and by 1901 382 hectares were dedicated to rice production, this reached a high of 900 hectares in 1945. During Moorish times Pego was of course a walled town, with the obligatory castle, after the reconquest these fortifications were extended and had in all 16 towers, most of this was destroyed during the War of Spanish Succession (1701–14). There are still some remains of the wall, these can be found in the Old Town where the medieval streets still retain much of their original charm.

== 21st century ==
During the 2024 Spanish floods, a road from Pego to El Verger was flooded.

== Economy ==
Pego's economy is based primarily on irrigated agriculture, including citrus cultivation and rice production in the Pego-Oliva wetlands. The town is also home to Textil Villa de Pego, S.L. (TVP), an agrotextile manufacturer founded in 1949. The company specialises in agricultural meshes, harvest collection covers and packaging sacks, employs over 100 people and exports to more than 15 countries. It is a leading European producer of agricultural sacks, manufacturing approximately 25 million units annually.

== Main sights ==
Worth visiting in Pego are the Arciprestal Church of Our Lady of the Assumption (16th century) built in the Renaissance style, built on the ruins of an earlier church, the Chapel of Ecce Homo (18th century) in the Baroque style and designed by the Valencian architect Fray Francisco Cabezas, the Church of the Sagrada Família, the hermitage of Sant Josep (19th century), the hermitage of Sant Miquel (17th century), the Castell d'Ambra (Castle Ambra) thought to originate from the early 13th century and the Parc Natural de la Marjal de Pego-Oliva (Natural Park of the Pego-Oliva Marshes).

== Climate ==
Pego has a hot summer mediterranean climate (Köppen climate classification: Csa) with mild, moderately rainy winters and hot to very hot, dry summers. Unlike other Mediterranean climates, autumn and spring are rainier than winter, with autumn being the wettest season. Summer, although dry, receives relatively high rainfall by Mediterranean standards, but still low enough to be classified as Mediterranean, as the driest month of summer only has 7.2 mm of precipitation. The average annual temperature is 19.8 °C (67.6 °F), which is high for its latitude. On 15 January 2024, Pego recorded a minimum temperature of 19.4 °C (66.9 °F), being the highest minimum temperature ever recorded in peninsular Spain in a month of January, while on 13 February 2016, a minimum temperature of 20 °C (68 °F) was recorded, being a tropical night in winter.

Climate data for Pego (2011-2025), extremes (2009-present)
Month	Jan	Feb	Mar	Apr	May	Jun	Jul	Aug	Sep	Oct	Nov	Dec	Year
Record high °C (°F)	28.7 (83.7)	28.1 (82.6)	32.4 (90.3)	36.5 (97.7)	41.5 (106.7)	41.9 (107.4)	44.0 (111.2)	43.9 (111.0)	41.6 (106.9)	35.2 (95.4)	31.3 (88.3)	26.7 (80.1)	44.0 (111.2)
Mean daily maximum °C (°F)	17.3 (63.1)	17.8 (64.0)	19.6 (67.3)	22.3 (72.1)	26.3 (79.3)	30.9 (87.6)	33.6 (92.5)	33.3 (91.9)	29.4 (84.9)	25.4 (77.7)	20.4 (68.7)	18.0 (64.4)	24.5 (76.1)
Daily mean °C (°F)	13.0 (55.4)	13.3 (55.9)	15.1 (59.2)	17.4 (63.3)	21.0 (69.8)	25.3 (77.5)	28.2 (82.8)	28.1 (82.6)	24.8 (76.6)	21.1 (70.0)	16.4 (61.5)	14.0 (57.2)	19.8 (67.7)
Mean daily minimum °C (°F)	8.7 (47.7)	8.8 (47.8)	10.5 (50.9)	12.5 (54.5)	15.6 (60.1)	19.6 (67.3)	22.7 (72.9)	22.9 (73.2)	20.2 (68.4)	16.8 (62.2)	12.5 (54.5)	9.9 (49.8)	15.1 (59.1)
Record low °C (°F)	0.6 (33.1)	0.3 (32.5)	3.6 (38.5)	5.8 (42.4)	8.5 (47.3)	13.3 (55.9)	17.4 (63.3)	17.1 (62.8)	13.4 (56.1)	7.2 (45.0)	4.3 (39.7)	1.1 (34.0)	0.3 (32.5)
Average precipitation mm (inches)	70.5 (2.78)	34.7 (1.37)	107.3 (4.22)	58.4 (2.30)	34.8 (1.37)	11.9 (0.47)	15.5 (0.61)	51.2 (2.02)	90.3 (3.56)	82.9 (3.26)	120.7 (4.75)	68.7 (2.70)	746.9 (29.41)
Source: Agencia Estatal de Meteorologia

== Culture ==
Pego celebrates a number of fiestas and festivals throughout the year and these include the Moors and Christians (late June), Porrat de Sant Antoni del Porquet (January), Carnival and the Pinyata (burial of the sardine).

Some typical local dishes include "Crosta" (rice baked in the oven with pork parts), botifarra (blood and onion sausage), chick peas and beaten eggs (baked on top at the end), "arros caldos" (soupy rice with beans, turnips, chicken, and pork) and paella with land snails and rabbit and many other varieties of paella. Tapas such as "pichinettes" (colorful tiny freshly caught clams sautéed in EVO with tomato, onion and lemon). "Caragols" land snails sautéed in tomato, tortilla shells with various speciality fillings such as tiny shrimp from the local river.

== Demographic population ==
Year	Population
1857	5,847
1887	6,509
1900	6,983
1910	7,849
1920	7,409
1930	8,398
1940	8,547
1950	8,491
1960	8,291
1970	8,861
1981	9,112
1991	9,062
2000	10,103
2007	10,878
2008	11,043
2009	11,133
2010	11,208
2011	11,116
2012	11,029
2013	10,957
2014	10,144
2015	10,331
2016	10,158
2017	9,923
