= Jalón =

Jalón Xaló
- Municipality
- Xaló (official)
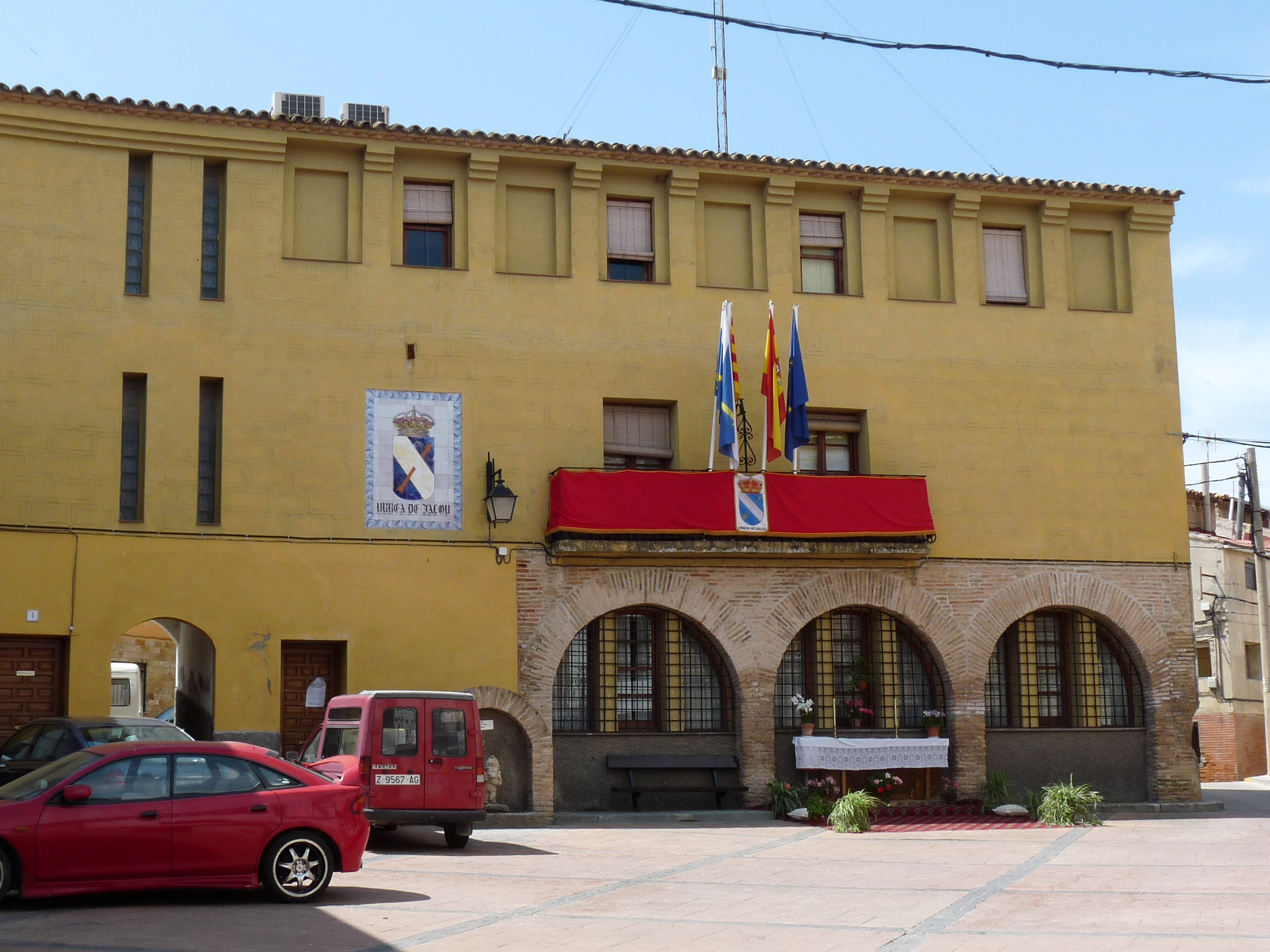
- Town hall

- Coat of arms

- Location in the Province of Alicante Jalón (Spain)
- Coordinates: 38°44′26″N 0°0′44″W
- Country: Spain
- Autonomous community: Valencian Community
- Province: Alicante
- Comarca: Marina Alta
- Judicial district: Dénia

Government
  - Alcalde: Joan Miquel Garcés Font (2011) (BNV)

Area
  - Total: 34.59 km^{2} (13.36 sq mi)
- Elevation: 189 m (620 ft)

Population (2025-01-01)
  - Total: 3,104
  - Density: 89.74/km^{2} (232.4/sq mi)
- Demonym(s): xaloner, -a (Val.) jalonense (Sp.)
- Time zone: UTC+1 (CET)
  - Summer (DST): UTC+2 (CEST)
- Postal code: 03727
- Official language(s): Valencian; Spanish
- Website: Official website

Jalón (Spanish: [xaˈlon]; Valencian: Xaló [ʃaˈlo]) is a municipality in the comarca of Marina Alta in the Valencian Community, Spain.

== Geography ==
The town of Jalón is located in the Jalón Valley (la Vall de Xaló). The Jalón (Xaló) or Gorgos river crosses the town, which has a length of 55 km (34 miles).

=== Climate ===
Jalón's climate is mild with mild winters and bearable summers due to its proximity of the Mediterranean Sea. The rainiest month is usually October.

== Main sights ==
- Route of the Valencian classics
