= List of municipalities in Alicante =

Map of Spain with the province of Alicante highlighted

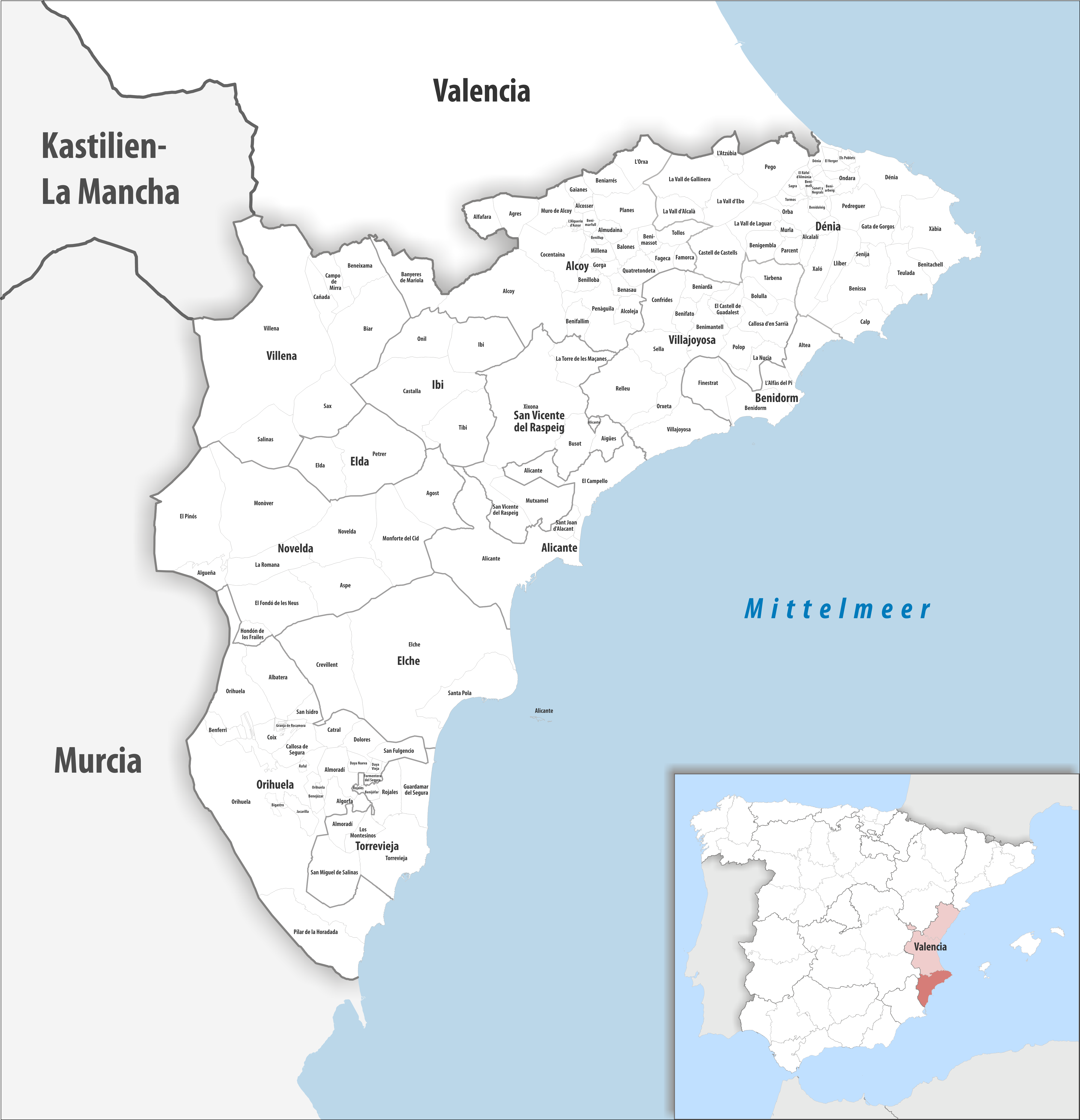
Map of the municipalities in the province of Alicante

Alicante or Alacant (officially: Alacant / Alicante) is a province in the autonomous community of Valencia, Spain, that is divided into 141 municipalities. As of the 2023 Spanish census, the province is the 5th largest by population, with 1,952,291 inhabitants, and the 41st largest by land area, spanning 5,817 km^{2} (2,246 sq mi). Municipalities are the basic local political division in Spain, and can only belong to one province. They enjoy a large degree of autonomy in their local administration, being in charge of tasks such as urban planning, water supply, lighting, roads, local police, and firefighting.

The organisation of municipalities in Spain is outlined in a local government law (Spanish: Ley 7/1985, de 2 de abril, Reguladora de las Bases del Régimen Local; transl. Law 7/1985, of 2 April, Regulating the Bases of the Local Administration) passed on 2 April 1985 and finalised by an 18 April 1986 royal decree. All citizens of Spain are required to register in the municipality in which they reside. Each municipality is a corporation with independent legal personhood: its governing body is called the ajuntament or ayuntamiento (municipal council or corporation), a term often also used to refer to the municipal offices (city and town halls). The ayuntamiento is composed of the mayor (alcalde), the deputy mayors (tinents d'alcalde or tenientes de alcalde) and the plenary assembly (ple or pleno) of councillors (regidors or concejales). Municipalities are categorised by population for the purpose of determining the number of councillors: three when the population is up to 100 inhabitants, five for 101–250, seven for 251–1,000, nine for 1,001–2,000, eleven for 2,001–5,000, thirteen for 5,001–10,000, seventeen for 10,001–20,000, twenty-one for 20,001–50,000, and twenty-five for 50,001–100,000. One councillor is added for every additional 100,000 inhabitants, with a further one added when the number of councillors based on this methodology would be even in order to prevent tied votes.

The mayor and the deputy mayors are elected by the plenary assembly, which is itself elected by universal suffrage. Elections in municipalities with more than 250 inhabitants are carried out following a proportional representation system with closed lists, whilst those with a population lower than 250 use a block plurality voting system with open lists. The plenary assembly must meet periodically at the seat of the ajuntament or ayuntamiento, with meetings occurring more or less frequently depending on the population of the municipality: monthly for those whose population is larger than 20,000, once every two months if it ranges between 5,001 and 20,000, and once every three months if it does not exceed 5,000. Many ajuntaments or ayuntamientos also have a local governing board (junta de govern local or junta de gobierno local), which is named by the mayor from amongst the councillors and is required for municipalities of more than 5,000 inhabitants. The board, whose role is to assist the mayor between meetings of the plenary assembly, may not include more than one third of the councillors.

The largest municipality by population in the province as of the 2023 Spanish census is Alacant / Alicante, its capital, with 349,282 residents, while the smallest is Tollos, with 40 residents. The largest municipality by area is Orihuela, which spans 365.36 km², while L'Alqueria d'Asnar is the smallest at 1.08 km².

== Municipalities ==
Official name	Name in Spanish	Name in co-official language (Valencian)	Population (2023)	Area (km^{2})	Density (2023)	Linguistic area	Comarca	INE code
Agost	Agost		5,067	66.64	76.03	Valencian	Alacantí	03002
Agres	Agres		619	25.84	23.95	Valencian	Comtat	03003
Aigües	Aguas de Busot	Aigües	1,146	18.47	62.04	Valencian	Alacantí	03004
Alacant / Alicante	Alicante	Alacant	349,282	201.27	1,735.39	Valencian	Alacantí	03014
Albatera	Albatera		13,092	61.54	212.73	Spanish	Vega Baja	03005
Alcalalí	Alcalalí		1,397	14.4	97.01	Valencian	Marina Alta	03006
Alcoleja	Alcolecha	Alcoleja	188	14.56	12.91	Valencian	Comtat	03008
Alcosser	Alcocer de Planes	Alcosser	259	4.39	58.99	Valencian	Comtat	03007
Alcoi / Alcoy	Alcoy	Alcoi	59,493	129.86	458.13	Valencian	Alcoià	03009
Alfafara	Alfafara		419	19.78	21.18	Valencian	Comtat	03010
L'Alfàs del Pi	Alfaz del Pi	L'Alfàs del Pi	20,518	19.26	1,065.31	Valencian	Marina Baixa	03011
Algorfa	Algorfa		3,635	18.47	196.80	Spanish	Vega Baja	03012
Algueña	Algueña	L'Alguenya	1,395	18.47	75.52	Valencian	Vinalopó Mitjà	03013
Almoradí	Almoradí		21,874	42.69	512.39	Spanish	Vega Baja	03015
Almudaina	Almudaina		110	8.82	12.47	Valencian	Comtat	03016
L'Alqueria d'Asnar	Alquería de Aznar	L'Alqueria d'Asnar	511	1.08	473.14	Valencian	Comtat	03017
Altea	Altea		23,820	34.43	691.83	Valencian	Marina Baixa	03018
Aspe	Aspe	Asp	21,473	70.57	304.27	Spanish	Baix Vinalopó	03019
L'Atzúbia	Adsubia	L'Atzúbia	608	14.67	41.44	Valencian	Marina Alta	03001
Balones	Balones		119	11.25	10.57	Valencian	Comtat	03020
Banyeres de Mariola	Bañeres	Banyeres de Mariola	7,255	50.28	144.29	Valencian	Alcoià	03021
Benasau	Benasau		173	9.04	19.13	Valencian	Comtat	03022
Beneixama	Benejama	Beneixama	1,697	34.89	48.63	Valencian	Alt Vinalopó	03023
Benejúzar	Benejúzar	Benejússer	5,625	9.33	602.89	Spanish	Vega Baja	03024
Benferri	Benferri		2,023	12.37	163.54	Spanish	Vega Baja	03025
Beniarbeig	Beniarbeig		2,353	7.4	317.97	Valencian	Marina Alta	03026
Beniardà	Beniardá	Beniardà	252	15.74	16.01	Valencian	Marina Baixa	03027
Beniarrés	Beniarrés		1,089	20.21	53.88	Valencian	Comtat	03028
Benidoleig	Benidoleig		1,218	7.48	162.83	Valencian	Marina Alta	03030
Benidorm	Benidorm		72,342	38.51	1,878.52	Valencian	Marina Baixa	03031
Benifallim	Benifallim		111	13.69	8.10	Valencian	Alcoià	03032
Benifato	Benifato		140	11.88	11.78	Valencian	Marina Baixa	03033
Benigembla	Benichembla	Benigembla	537	18.45	29.10	Valencian	Marina Alta	03029
Benijófar	Benijófar	Benijòfer	3,473	4.36	796.55	Spanish	Vega Baja	03034
Benilloba	Benilloba		737	9.54	77.25	Valencian	Comtat	03035
Benillup	Benillup		105	3.38	31.06	Valencian	Comtat	03036
Benimantell	Benimantell		534	37.93	14.07	Valencian	Marina Baixa	03037
Benimarfull	Benimarfull		422	5.56	75.89	Valencian	Comtat	03038
Benimassot	Benimasot	Benimassot	105	9.51	11.04	Valencian	Comtat	03039
Benimeli	Benimeli		455	3.5	130	Valencian	Marina Alta	03040
Benissa	Benisa	Benissa	12,279	69.71	176.14	Valencian	Marina Alta	03041
Biar	Biar		3,607	98.17	36.74	Valencian	Alt Vinalopó	03043
Bigastro	Bigastro	Bigastre	7,361	4.1	1,795.36	Spanish	Vega Baja	03044
Bolulla	Bolulla		440	13.57	32.42	Valencian	Marina Baixa	03045
Busot	Busot		3,534	33.84	104.43	Valencian	Alacantí	03046
Callosa de Segura	Callosa de Segura		19,484	24.91	782.17	Spanish	Vega Baja	03049
Callosa d'en Sarrià	Callosa de Ensarriá	Callosa d'en Sarrià	7,708	34.66	222.38	Valencian	Marina Baixa	03048
Calp	Calpe	Calp	25,854	23.61	1,095.04	Valencian	Marina Alta	03047
El Campello	Campello	El Campello	29,993	55.27	542.66	Valencian	Alacantí	03050
Camp de Mirra / El Camp de Mirra	Campo de Mirra	El Camp de Mirra	442	21.82	20.25	Valencian	Alt Vinalopó	03051
Cañada	Cañada	La Canyada	1,210	19.32	62.62	Valencian	Alt Vinalopó	03052
Castalla	Castalla		11,365	114.6	99.17	Valencian	Alcoià	03053
Castell de Castells	Castell de Castells		445	45.93	9.68	Valencian	Marina Baixa	03054
El Castell de Guadalest	Guadalest	El Castell de Guadalest	274	15.96	17.16	Valencian	Marina Baixa	03075
Catral	Catral		9,275	20.02	463.28	Spanish	Vega Baja	03055
Cocentaina	Cocentaina		11,309	52.94	213.61	Valencian	Comtat	03056
Confrides	Confrides		297	39.98	7.42	Valencian	Marina Baixa	03057
Cox	Cox	Coix	7,513	16.71	449.61	Spanish	Vega Baja	03058
Crevillent	Crevillente	Crevillent	30,191	104.55	288.77	Valencian	Baix Vinalopó	03059
Daya Nueva	Daya Nueva	Daia Nova	1,767	7.09	249.22	Spanish	Vega Baja	03061
Daya Vieja	Daya Vieja	Daia Vella	667	3.14	212.42	Spanish	Vega Baja	03062
Dénia	Denia	Dénia	45,622	66.18	689.36	Valencian	Marina Alta	03063
Dolores	Dolores	Dolors	7,919	18.7	423.47	Spanish	Vega Baja	03064
Elda	Elda		53,034	45.79	1,158.20	Spanish	Vinalopó Mitjà	03066
Elx / Elche	Elche	Elx	238,293	326.5	729.84	Valencian	Baix Vinalopó	03065
Fageca	Facheca	Fageca	101	10.17	9.93	Valencian	Comtat	03067
Famorca	Famorca		45	9.72	4.62	Valencian	Comtat	03068
Finestrat	Finestrat		8,836	42.25	209.13	Valencian	Marina Baixa	03069
El Fondó de les Neus / Hondón de las Nieves	Hondón de las Nieves	El Fondó de les Neus	2,698	68.85	39.18	Valencian	Vinalopó Mitjà	03077
Formentera del Segura	Formentera del Segura		4,618	4.33	1,066.51	Spanish	Vega Baja	03070
Gaianes	Gayanes	Gaianes	555	9.57	57.99	Valencian	Comtat	03072
Gata de Gorgos	Gata de Gorgos		6,515	20.33	320.46	Valencian	Marina Alta	03071
Gorga	Gorga		284	9.11	31.17	Valencian	Comtat	03073
Granja de Rocamora	Granja de Rocamora	La Granja de Rocamora	2,686	7.17	374.61	Spanish	Vega Baja	03074
Guardamar del Segura	Guardamar del Segura		17,328	33.94	510.54	Valencian	Vega Baja	03076
Hondón de los Frailes	Hondón de los Frailes	El Fondó dels Frares	1,311	12.55	104.46	Valencian	Vinalopó Mitjà	03078
Ibi	Ibi		23,920	62.52	382.59	Valencian	Alcoià	03079
Jacarilla	Jacarilla	Xacarella	2,108	12.2	172.78	Spanish	Vega Baja	03080
Llíber	Llíber		946	21.93	43.13	Valencian	Marina Alta	03085
Millena	Millena		254	9.77	25.99	Valencian	Comtat	03086
Monforte del Cid	Monforte del Cid	Montfort	8,777	79.52	110.37	Spanish	Vinalopó Mitjà	03088
Monòver / Monóvar	Monóvar	Monòver	12,542	152.36	82.31	Valencian	Vinalopó Mitjà	03089
Los Montesinos	Los Montesinos		5,477	14.99	365.37	Spanish	Vega Baja	03903
Murla	Murla		575	5.81	98.96	Valencian	Marina Alta	03091
Muro de Alcoy	Muro de Alcoy	Muro d'Alcoi	9,253	30.24	305.98	Valencian	Comtat	03092
Mutxamel	Muchamiel	Mutxamel	27,078	47.65	568.26	Valencian	Alacantí	03090
Novelda	Novelda		25,771	75.72	340.34	Valencian	Vinalopó Mitjà	03093
La Nucia	La Nucía	La Nucia	18,970	21.36	888.10	Valencian	Marina Baixa	03094
Ondara	Ondara		7,308	10.41	702.01	Valencian	Marina Alta	03095
Onil	Onil		7,763	48.41	160.35	Valencian	Alcoià	03096
Orba	Orba		2,379	17.73	134.17	Valencian	Marina Alta	03097
Orihuela	Orihuela	Oriola	82,449	365.36	225.66	Spanish	Vega Baja	03099
L'Orxa / Lorcha	Lorcha	L'Orxa	587	31.76	18.48	Valencian	Comtat	03084
Orxeta	Orcheta	Orxeta	840	24.06	34.91	Valencian	Marina Baixa	03098
Parcent	Parcent		1,003	11.77	85.21	Valencian	Marina Alta	03100
Pedreguer	Pedreguer		8,558	29.58	289.31	Valencian	Marina Alta	03101
Pego	Pego		10,485	52.85	198.39	Valencian	Marina Alta	03102
Penàguila	Penáguila	Penàguila	313	49.92	6.27	Valencian	Alcoià	03103
Petrer	Petrel	Petrer	33,914	104.09	325.81	Valencian	Vinalopó Mitjà	03104
Pilar de la Horadada	Pilar de la Horadada	El Pilar de la Foradada	23,428	77.81	301.09	Spanish	Vega Baja	03902
El Pinós / Pinoso	Pinoso	El Pinós	8,281	126.46	65.48	Valencian	Vinalopó Mitjà	03105
Planes	Planes		699	38.87	17.98	Valencian	Comtat	03106
El Poble Nou de Benitatxell / Benitachell	Benitachell	El Poble Nou de Benitatxell	4,858	12.65	384.03	Valencian	Marina Alta	03042
Els Poblets	Els Poblets		2,763	3.62	763.25	Valencian	Marina Alta	03901
Polop	Polop		5,339	22.56	236.65	Valencian	Marina Baixa	03107
Quatretondeta	Cuatretondeta	Quatretondeta	136	16.7	8.14	Valencian	Comtat	03060
Rafal	Rafal		4,800	1.57	3,057.32	Spanish	Vega Baja	03109
El Ràfol d'Almúnia	Ráfol de Almunia	El Ràfol d'Almúnia	721	4.88	147.74	Valencian	Marina Alta	03110
Redován	Redován	Redovà	8,183	9.45	865.92	Spanish	Vega Baja	03111
Relleu	Relleu		1,248	76.87	16.23	Valencian	Marina Baixa	03112
Rojales	Rojales	Rojals	17,451	27.73	629.31	Spanish	Vega Baja	03113
La Romana	La Romana		2,632	43.29	60.79	Valencian	Vinalopó Mitjà	03114
Sagra	Sagra		442	5.62	78.64	Valencian	Marina Alta	03115
Salinas	Salinas	Salines	1,733	61.71	28.08	Spanish	Alt Vinalopó	03116
San Fulgencio	San Fulgencio	Sant Fulgenci	9,443	20.7	456.18	Spanish	Vega Baja	03118
San Isidro	San Isidro	Sant Isidre	2,208	11.7	188.71	Spanish	Vega Baja	03904
San Miguel de Salinas	San Miguel de Salinas	Sant Miquel de les Salines	6,798	54.85	123.93	Spanish	Vega Baja	03120
Sanet y Negrals	Sanet y Negrals	Sanet i els Negrals	737	3.94	187.05	Valencian	Marina Alta	03117
Sant Joan d'Alacant	San Juan de Alicante	Sant Joan d'Alacant	25,275	9.64	2,621.88	Valencian	Alacantí	03119
Sant Vicent del Raspeig / San Vicente del Raspeig	San Vicente del Raspeig	Sant Vicent del Raspeig	59,928	40.55	1,477.87	Valencian	Alacantí	03122
Santa Pola	Santa Pola		37,816	58.16	650.20	Valencian	Baix Vinalopó	03121
Sax	Sax	Saix	10,072	63.48	158.66	Spanish	Alt Vinalopó	03123
Sella	Sella		607	38.72	15.67	Valencian	Marina Baixa	03124
Senija	Senija		670	4.79	139.87	Valencian	Marina Alta	03125
Tàrbena	Tárbena	Tàrbena	630	31.67	19.89	Valencian	Marina Baixa	03127
Teulada	Teulada		12,515	32.25	388.06	Valencian	Marina Alta	03128
Tibi	Tibi		1,808	70.38	25.68	Valencian	Alcoià	03129
Tollos	Tollos		40	15.97	2.50	Valencian	Comtat	03130
Tormos	Tormos		339	5.36	63.24	Valencian	Marina Alta	03131
La Torre de les Maçanes / Torremanzanas	Torremanzanas	La Torre de les Maçanes	714	36.48	19.57	Valencian	Alacantí	03132
Torrevieja	Torrevieja	Torrevella	89,290	71.76	1,244.28	Spanish	Vega Baja	03133
La Vall d'Alcalà	Valle de Alcalá	La Vall d'Alcalà	174	22.85	7.61	Valencian	Marina Alta	03134
La Vall d'Ebo	Vall de Ebo	La Vall d'Ebo	230	32.43	7.09	Valencian	Marina Alta	03135
La Vall de Gallinera	Vall de Gallinera	La Vall de Gallinera	581	53.63	10.83	Valencian	Marina Alta	03136
La Vall de Laguar	Vall de Laguart	La Vall de Laguar	873	23.05	37.87	Valencian	Marina Alta	03137
El Verger	Vergel	El Verger	5,101	8.16	625.12	Valencian	Marina Alta	03138
La Vila Joiosa / Villajoyosa	Villajoyosa	La Vila Joiosa	36,093	59.25	609.16	Valencian	Marina Baixa	03139
Villena	Villena		34,144	345.38	98.85	Spanish	Alt Vinalopó	03140
Xàbia / Jávea	Jávea	Xàbia	29,760	68.59	433.88	Valencian	Marina Alta	03082
Xaló	Jalón	Xaló	2,964	34.59	85.68	Valencian	Marina Alta	03081
Xixona / Jijona	Jijona	Xixona	7,032	163.76	42.94	Valencian	Alacantí	03083

== Gallery ==
Pictures of the largest municipalities in the province of Alicante by population

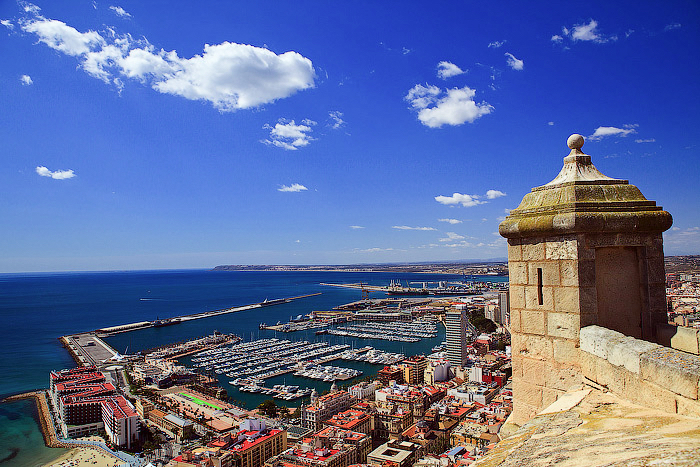
Alacant / Alicante

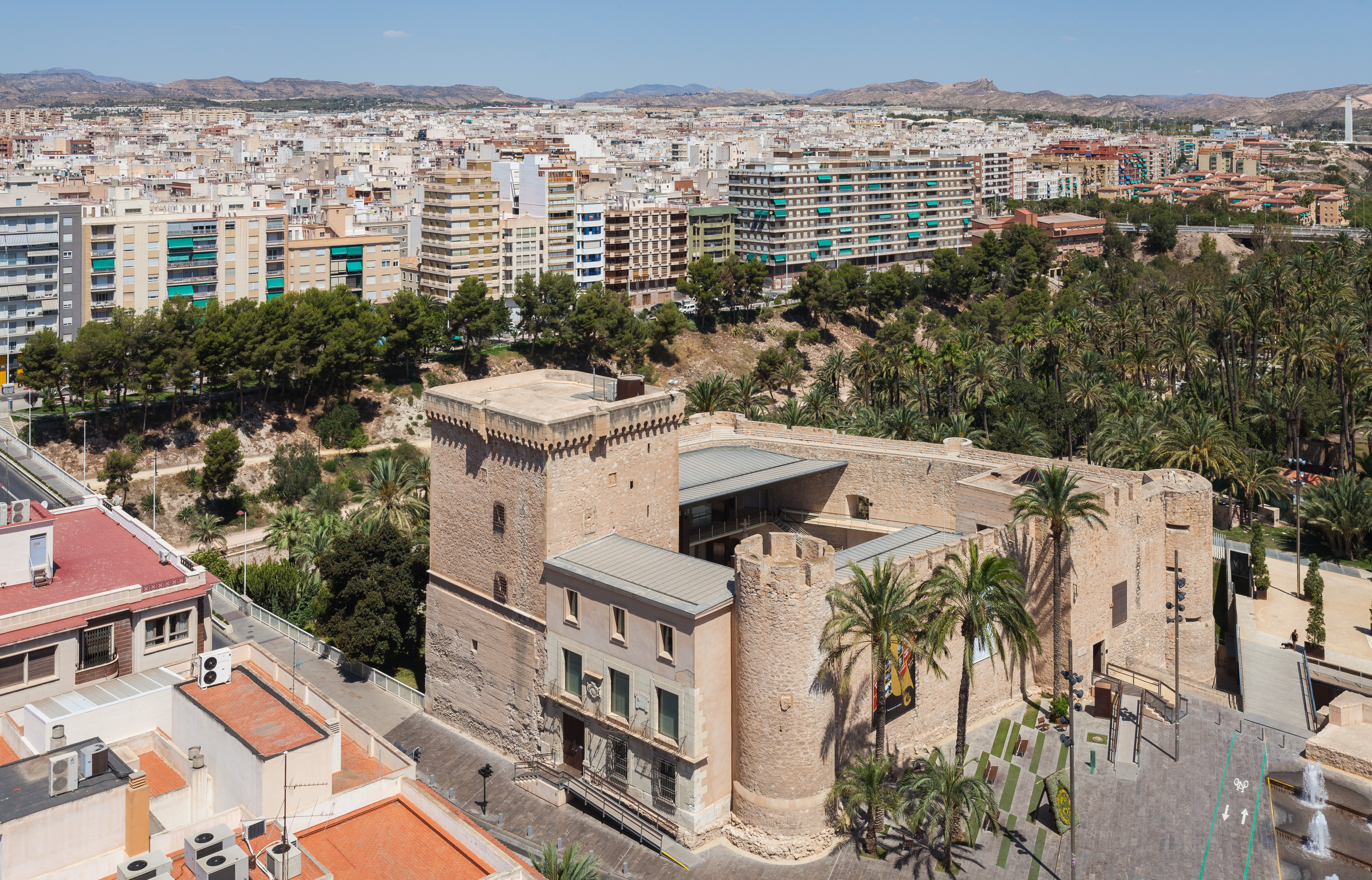
Elx / Elche

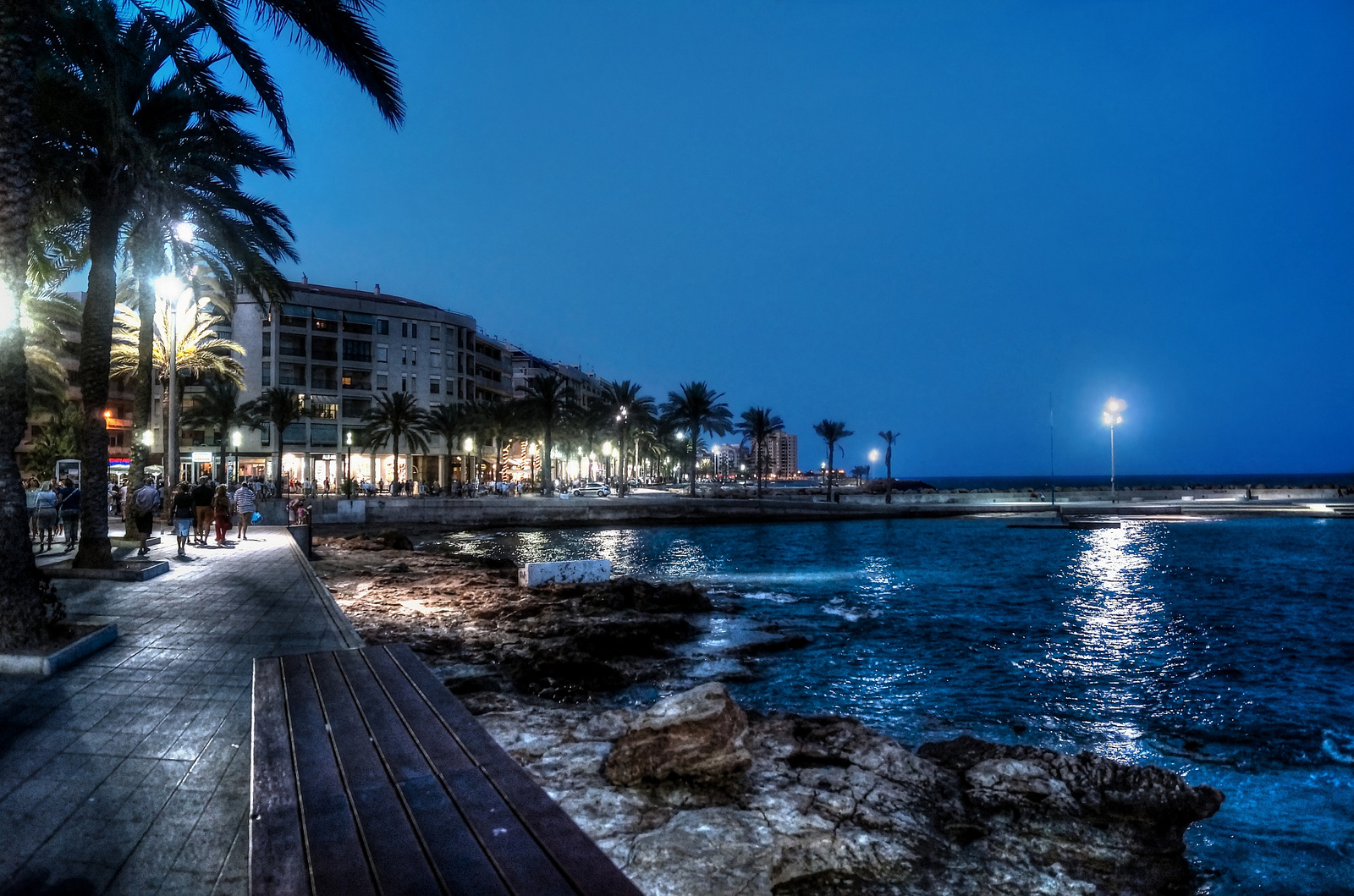
Torrevieja

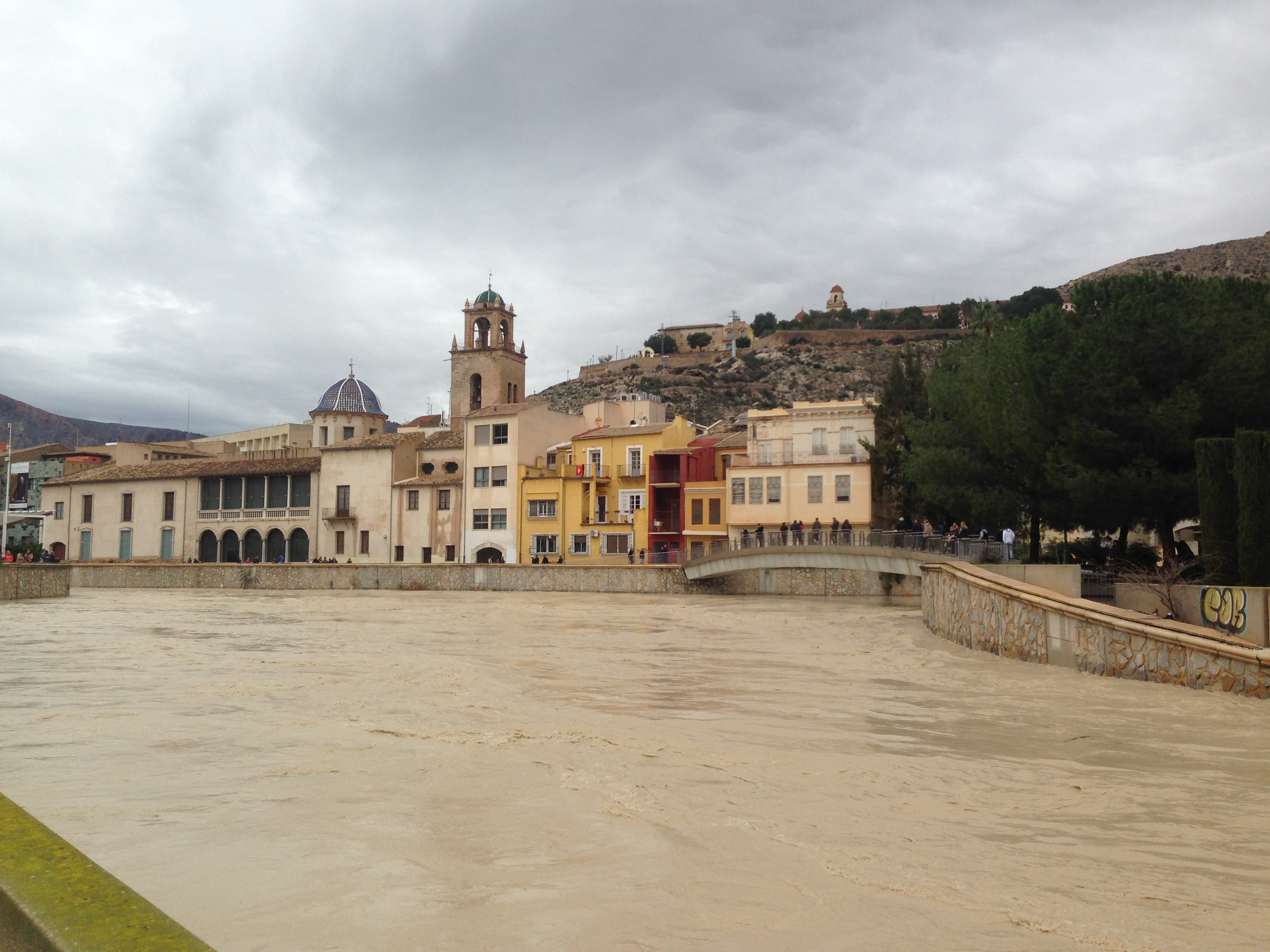
Orihuela

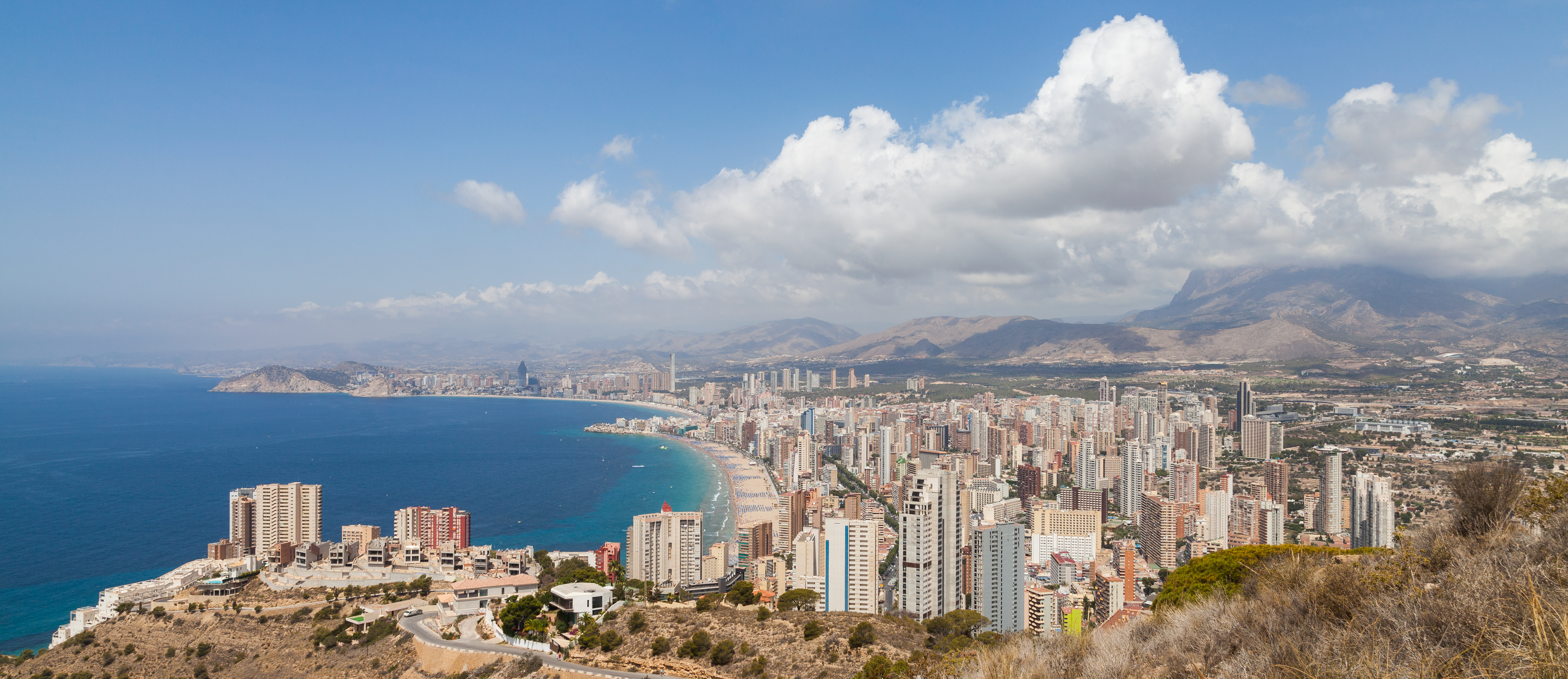
Benidorm

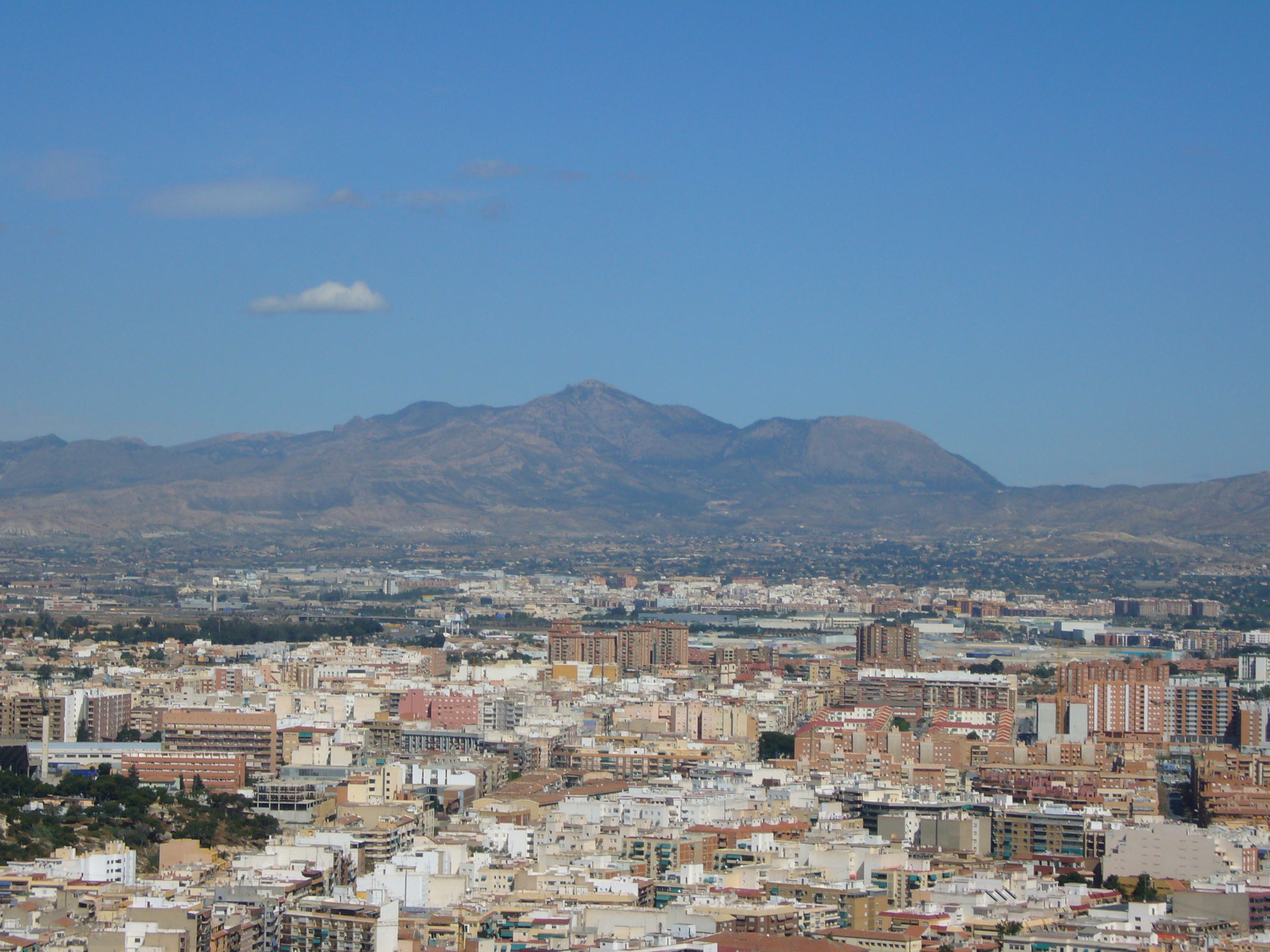
Sant Vicent del Raspeig / San Vicente del Raspeig

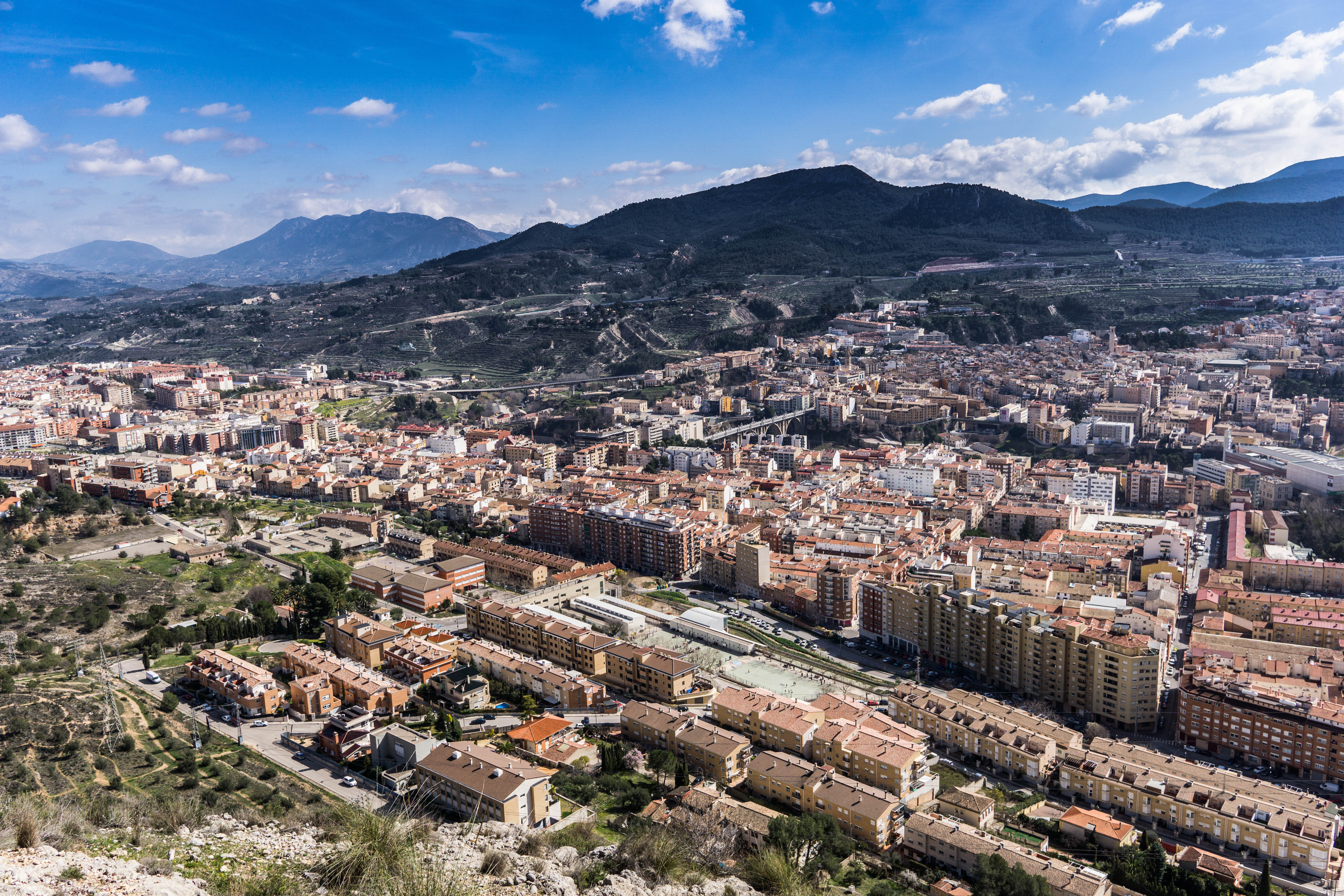
Alcoi / Alcoy

== See also ==
- Geography of Spain
- List of Spanish cities
