= Relleu =

- Municipality
- Flag Coat of arms

- Location in Spain
- Coordinates: 38°35′14″N 0°18′41″W
- Country: Spain
- Autonomous community: Valencian Community
- Province: Alicante
- Region: Marina Baixa
- Judicial district: Villajoyosa/La Vila Joiosa

Government
  - Mayor: Lino Antonio Pascual Carbonell (since 2019) (PP)

Area
  - Total: 76.87 km^{2} (29.68 sq mi)
- Elevation: 429 m (1,407 ft)

Population (2025-01-01)
  - Total: 1,375
  - Density: 17.89/km^{2} (46.33/sq mi)
- Demonym(s): Relleuer(a) (Valencian); Relleuero/a (Spanish)
- Time zone: UTC+1 (CET)
  - Summer (DST): UTC+2 (CEST)
- Postal code: 03578
- Official language(s): Valencian, Spanish
- Website: Relleu Town Hall

Relleu (Valencian: [reˈʎew], Spanish: [reˈʎew]) is a municipality in the comarca of Marina Baixa, Alicante, Valencia, Spain.

== Geography ==
Relleu is set in the middle of a valley surrounded by mountains like the Cabeçó d'Or (1,209 m), the Serra de la Grana (1,095 m) and the Serra de l'Aguilar (895 m). The best way to access Relleu is coming from Villajoyosa/La Vila Joiosa, take the road that connects with Orxeta-Sella (CV-770). From Alicante, you can also access this location through the AP-7 or N-332 then take the CV-775 up from El Campello.

Relleu borders the municipalities of Aigües, Alicante/Alacant, Busot, Jijona/Xixona, Orxeta, Penàguila, Sella and Torremanzanas/La Torre de les Maçanes.

== History ==
Relleu has an interesting Roman past. It was brought into focus by Doctor Alejandro Sendra, who found, on his property, the burial stone of ‘Paccius’ that indicated Roman occupation well inside the Imperium. More findings from recent works in the town, although not yet closely studied, will shed more light on the past of the town, which, during the Roman period, was probably within the administration of the important nearby Roman town of Villajoyosa/La Vila Joiosa.

The history of Relleu precedes the Romans by at least four centuries as there was an Iberian settlement within the Parish boundaries a little distance from the town on the highest point of the Penya-roja (Spanish Peñarroja). As detailed in the book ‘Contestina Ibérica’ by E. Llobregat.

Unfortunately the site has been looted but there still remain half meter thick walls and a significant quantity of Iberian amphora fragments, small pieces of Iberian ceramic and over the hillside, slag from iron working.

This material, together with other artefacts deposited in the local museum, with similar characteristics to those found in the settlement give the impression of permanent occupation more or less through the 2nd and 1st centuries BC when Romans controlled the area.

Relleu (which means "relief" in Valencian) owes its name to the rugged terrain that makes up the municipality and is overlooked by the ruins of an 11th-century castle built by the Muslim population. The town consisted of 70 houses linked with Cocentaina. After the conquest of the region by the troops of James I of Aragon Relleu would become the property of Bernat de Sarrià depending ecclesiastically on Finestrat parish until 1535.

In the late 16th century the property was under the Duke of Osuna and years later, the 1609 decree by Philip III expelling the Moors dramatically affected the town's population, who fled to the mountains and then, together with the Moors of Finestrat and Sella, rose up against Alicante. Only 15 Christian families remained.

The town became one of the most populous in the area at the beginning of the 20th century, having 3,342 inhabitants. This was due to irrigation of the horta by the Amadorio River. The ruins of the castle are protected by the Law on Spanish Historical Heritage.

== Demographics ==
The population went from 3,342 registered inhabitants in 1900 to 717 in 1991 due to the migration of its inhabitants. In recent years Relleu has become an attractive destination for (mainly) British citizens, which has reversed the depopulation, so that in 2011 it had 1,338 inhabitants of which 42.1% were of foreign nationality, however, by 2018 the figure had fallen to 38.3%.

Year	1857	1887	1900	1910	1920	1930	1940	1950	1960	1970	1981	1991	2001	2006	2007	2009	2010	2011	2015	2019
Population	2,521	3,018	3,342	3,080	2,690	2,424	2,001	1,813	1,539	1,307	1,009	717	795	1,046	1,090	1,262	1,279	1,338	1,279	1,160

A table showing the increase in the number of foreign residents since 2000.

Year	2000	2001	2002	2003	2004	2005	2006	2007	2008	2009	2010	2011	2018
Natives	760	741	737	725	725	749	741	720	763	758	752	775	707
Foreigners	35	54	84	131	200	273	305	370	442	504	527	563	440

== Language ==
Valencian and Spanish are the two official languages.

A visitor to Relleu is likely to encounter two languages being used for notices around the town and in the entrance to the town hall; these are Valencian and English. In addition, the town hall employs a native English speaker to liaise with foreigners.

== Economy ==
Although agriculture (mainly almonds and olives) is still in practice, it is not as important as it was in the last century and today the economic source of Relleu depends mostly on the services sector.

Relleu had 24,654 motor vehicles on its register in 2008 due to a large vehicle tax rebate being paid by the town hall. This equates to 23 cars per inhabitant making it the municipality with the largest number of registered vehicles per capita in Spain.

== Monuments and places of interest ==
Relleu Castle. This tenth-century Moorish castle is now in ruins. It was listed as being of "Special Cultural Interest" in 2001.

Casa Balde, La Garrofera. Listed as being of "Special Cultural Interest" in 1997.

Torre de la Vallonga. Listed as being of "Special Cultural Interest" in 1997.

The Town Centre. As steep and narrow as the best Arab souks, is very well preserved and has examples of significant architectural interest. The Plaza of the Sacred Heart of Jesus is at its centre and serves as a meeting place for the inhabitants.

St. James Parish Church. This was first built in the seventeenth century on the ancient Moorish cemetery and then demolished in the late nineteenth century. Rebuilding was finished in 1931. Five years later, because of the Civil War the church was burned and had to be reformed again. Its bells are unique as they are the oldest in the entire province. During the Civil War a militia truck came for the bells. The mayor at the time was Don Francisco Carbonell i Climent, known by the nickname "Quico Cit". The militia chief put a gun to the mayor's chest and ordered him to have the bells ready for collection in two weeks' time. When they returned to collect the bells Quico Cit bravely said that he needed a permit in order for the bells to leave Relleu. Faced with this determination to keep the bells, the militiamen went away, never to return.

Name of Bell	Diameter	Weight	Year
Santa Bàrbara	49 cm	15 cwt (762 kg)	1827
Puríssima Concepció	73 cm	25 cwt (1,270 kg)	1873
Maria del Milagro y S.Jaime	92 cm	36 cwt (1,829 kg)	1790

Chapel of St. Albert. Located on one of the hills near the town centre. The climb (including the Stations of the Cross) gives some of the best views of Relleu and much of the surrounding area.

Pantano/Pantà de Relleu. Located on the southeastern outskirts of town, just before the boundary with Orxeta and where the Amadorio river tributaries meet. There is an eighteenth-century dam wall of vault-arch construction, 30 metres high and 10 metres thick. The dam was built at the instigation of the inhabitants of Villajoyosa, who received a document in 1653 from King Philip IV authorizing its construction. Currently, this dam is unused. The site is impressive because of the steepness of the river gorge.

The 'Kick of St. James' marks a footprint on the rock whose origin is attributed to an alleged visit made by the Apostle to the area.

The K-T Boundary. On the road to Torremanzanas, near the village water supply, is one of just a few places where one can see evidence of the K-T Boundary, this is a geological mark left by an asteroid that struck the earth causing the K–T extinction event which killed the dinosaurs.

== Local celebrations ==
There are 3 official fiestas known as Festes Majors in Valencian (Spanish Fiestas Mayores):

Festes Patronals. These are held for 5 days over the last weekend of September in honour of the Virgin of Miracles and Saints Cosme and Damian. The celebrations include religious ceremonies and recreational events such as the paella contest, correfoc (fire-runs), music and fireworks.

Sant Albert. This takes place for 5 days over the weekend closest to 7 August. It is celebrated by making a pilgrimage to the shrine of the saint. There are also sardines, paella, cucanyes (games), costume parade, orchestras, banyà (swimming).

Mare de Déu del Miracle. In 1710 there was a severe drought with crops failing and animals dying. The men of Relleu, who never went to church, all agreed to attend and pray for rain. Their prayers were answered and the drought ended. 11 April commemorates the miracle of the Mare de Déu del Miracle (Mother of God of the Miracle) with flowers, revetla (dancing outdoors at night) and processions. This is primarily a religious festival.

Other fiestas:

Rodar les Aixames. This fiesta which is performed in only a handful of towns (Jijona/Xixona, Tibi, Torremanzanas and Relleu), takes place on the evening of 24 December. It is a festival of pagan origin in which torches (aixames) are lit and spun around. The people (mostly children) parade through the streets. There have been cases of children being burnt but the tradition is considered to be of historic importance and it continues to be given permission by the town hall.

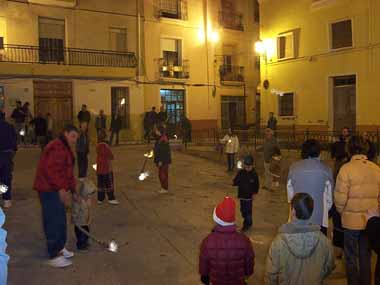
Rodar les Aixames

La Matança (Slaughter). Is celebrated on the day of St. Anthony (closest weekend to 17 Jan) in memory of the date when, historically the locals slaughtered their pigs. At the end of the ceremony the public are invited to taste the meat, all accompanied by the town musicians.

Concurs d'Alfàbegues (Basil contest). This fiesta is relatively new. It started in 2000 and is held two weeks before the festival of Mare de Déu del Miracle. It is a revival of an old fiesta which was historically held on 15 August in honour of Mare de Déu Gità .The aim of the fiesta is to engage people in planting and caring for plants/trees. Prizes are given on Sunday for the best plants.

== Gastronomy ==
The local dishes are "Olleta de Blat" (literally in English 'big pot of wheat') a bean, pork rib and black pudding stew. The "Borra" made with spinach, cauliflower, sausages and cod. "Faseura" with corn cakes. Plus the various "coques" (sweet or savoury bread based cakes) named "Farcida", "Escaldà", or "a la Paleta".

== Images of Relleu ==
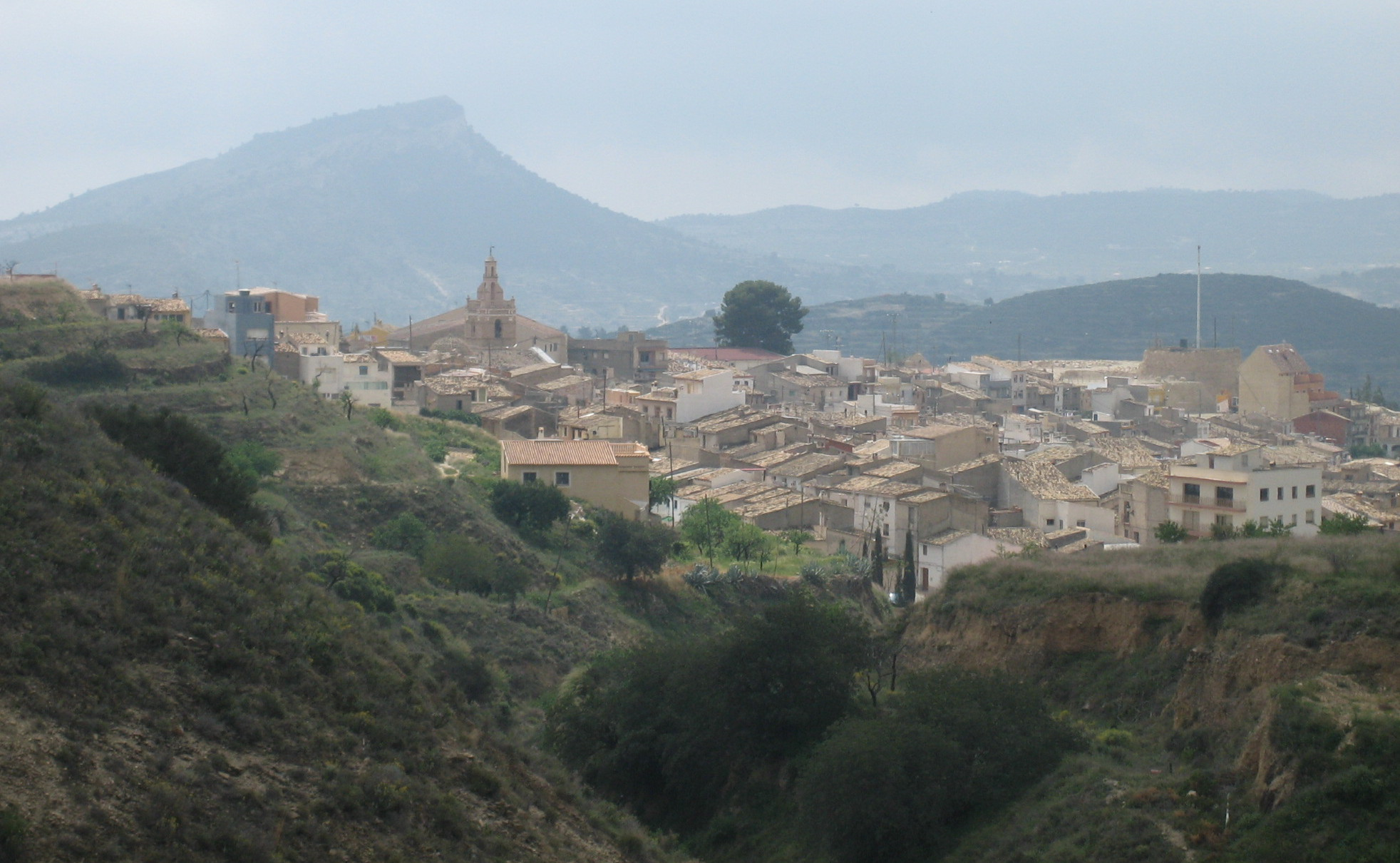
View of Relleu

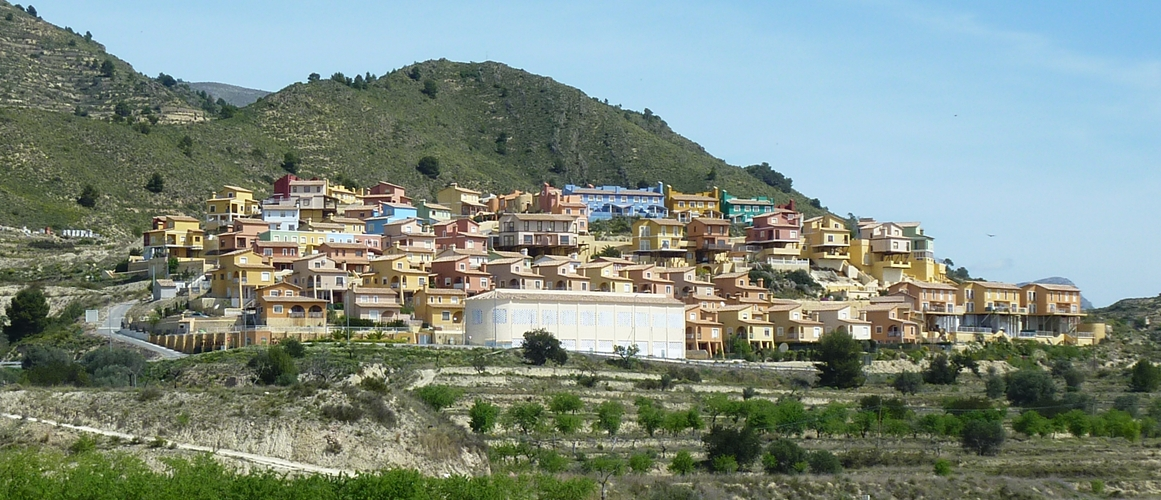
Muscaret Urbanisation

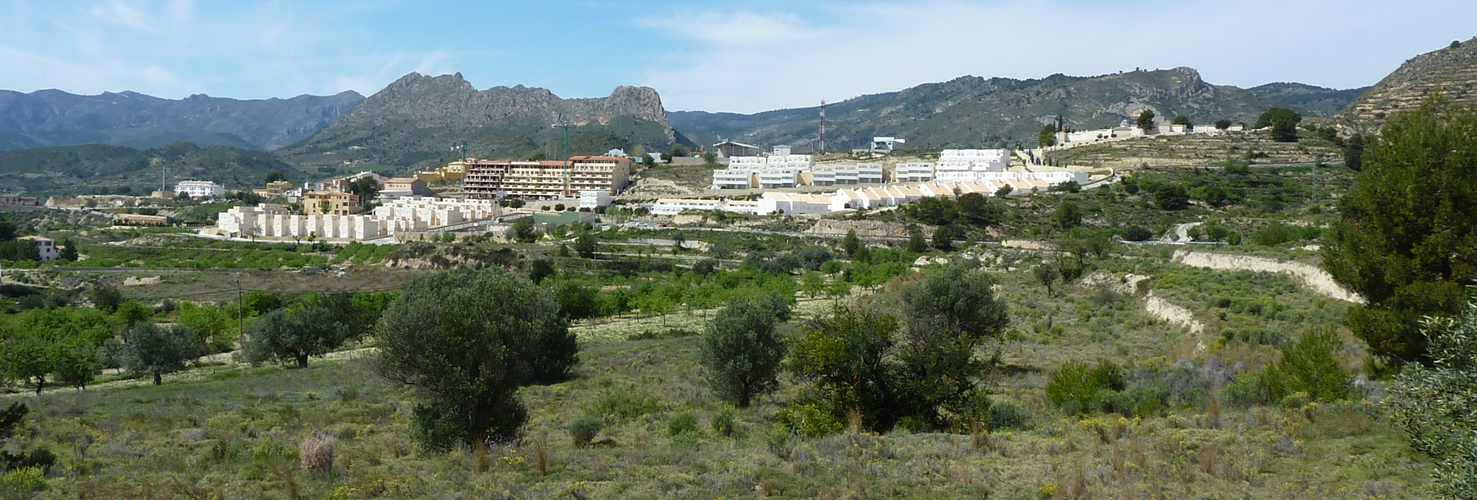
The 2010 urbanisations
