= Callosa d'en Sarrià =

- Municipality
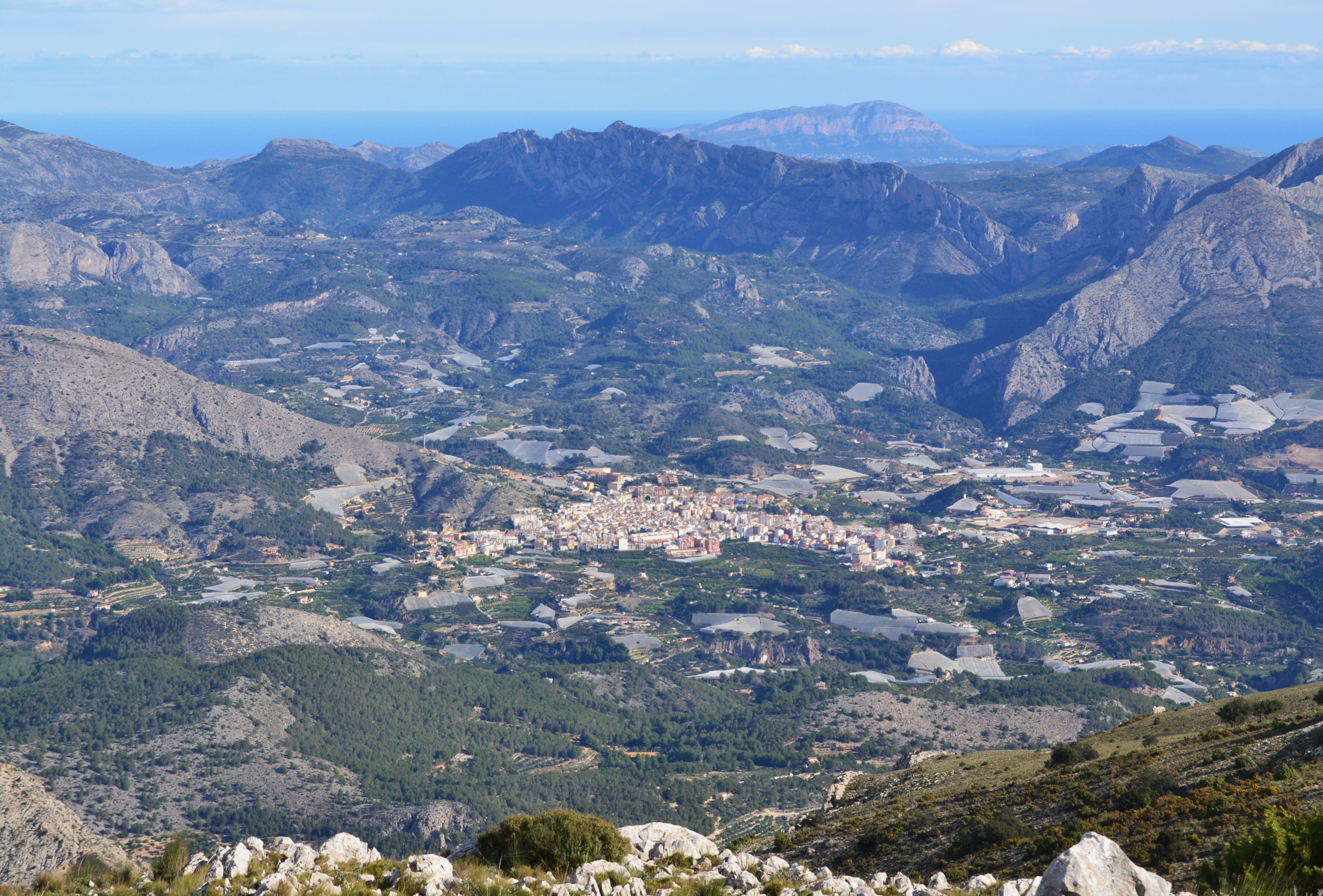

- Coat of arms

- Location in Spain
- Coordinates: 38°39′5″N 0°7′22″W
- Country: Spain
- Autonomous community: Valencian Community
- Province: Alicante
- Comarca: Marina Baixa
- Judicial district: Villajoyosa

Government
  - Alcalde: Juan Bautista Saval Ferrando (2007) (PP)

Area
  - Total: 34.66 km^{2} (13.38 sq mi)
- Elevation: 247 m (810 ft)

Population (2025-01-01)
  - Total: 8,182
  - Density: 236.1/km^{2} (611.4/sq mi)
- Demonym(s): Callosí, callosina
- Time zone: UTC+1 (CET)
  - Summer (DST): UTC+2 (CEST)
- Postal code: 03510
- Official language(s): Valencian
- Website: Official website

Callosa d'en Sarrià (Valencian: [kaˈʎoza ðen sariˈa] is a Valencian town and municipality located in the comarca of Marina Baixa, in the province of Alicante, Spain, lying in the valley of the river Guadalest, 50 km from the city of Alicante. Callosa d'en Sarrià has an area of 24.8 km^{2} and according to the 2003 census, a total population of 8,060 inhabitants. The economy of Callosa is chiefly based on tourism and agriculture: it is the main producer of loquat in Spain. The most important monuments in the town are the Catholic archipresbyteral church of Sant Joan Baptista (Saint John), built in the 18th century, and the Fortress of Bèrnia, built in the 17th century at the top of a nearby mountain to defend the city from pirates and Moriscos.

== Toponymy ==
The rivers Guadalest and Algar cross the town, which is surrounded by the mountains of Aitana, Bèrnia and Xortà. It has a Mediterranean climate with temperatures averaging 17 °C in January, with a high of 24 °C in summer and a low of 9.5 °C in winter.

Callosa is located 10 km from the coast at the intersection on the C-3318 that connects Benidorm with Pego and the road from Benidorm to Alcoi through Guadalest. From Alicante, Callosa may be reached via the AP-7 or the N-332 in Benidorm, then by the CV-70 and then by the CV-715 in La Nucia.

=== Bordering towns ===
Callosa borders the municipalities of Altea, Bolulla, Guadalest, Xaló, La Nucia, Polop and Tàrbena.

== History ==
Deposits have been discovered belonging to the Neolithic (5,000 BC), Chalcolithic, Bronze Age, Iberian and Roman eras. These settlements formed the basis for the establishment of Muslim hamlets in different parts of the municipality.

The origin of Callosa (meaning probably "land hard, dry" in Latin) is an ancient Muslim farmhouse, after the Christian reconquest by the king James I of Aragon in the 13th century, the property was acquired by Admiral Bernat de Sarrià in 1290 during the reign of Alfonso III of Aragon, becoming its first feudal lord. Hence, since then the city was renamed Callosa d'en Sarrià and became the center of the manor, which extended over part of the current district of Marina Baixa.

Afterwards it was acquired by different noble families and other entities, among which were the Sarrià (1290–1335), the Crown of Aragon (1335–1445), the Bou (1445–1560), the Moncada (1560–1767) and the Count of Orgaz (1767). Today, the noble title of the people belongs to the family of Valldaura Crespí.

The city retains the old town part of its medieval urban structure, bounded by a line of walls of the intramural Callosa, which still can be entered by one of its original gates: El Portal.

== Demography ==
Callosa has 7.888 residents (INE 2010). A 30.4% of the census are foreigners, mainly from Latin America (mainly Ecuador and Bolivia) and the European continent.

Demographic evolution of Callosa d'en Sarrià
	1857	1887	1900	1910	1920	1930	1940	1950	1960	1970	1981	1991	2000	2005	2008	2009	2010
Población	3.889	4.206	4.195	4.415	4.070	4.098	4.101	4.189	4.617	5.701	7.127	7.503	6.488	8.179	8.224	8.056	7.888

== Economy ==
Callosa has a highly competitive agriculture based on loquats and medlars, introduced in Spain in the 19th century by the Callosan Juan Bautista Berenguer y Ronda. Farmers are partners in a cooperative that handles the marketing of fruits, intended mostly for exporting; their main destinations are France and Italy.

Recently the City Council managed the "denominación de origen" (DO) and thus, the Council of the Designation of Origin of loquats from Callosa d'en Sarrià, with a view to establish quality standards for the loquat produced in Callosa and its region.

The tourism sector has experienced a significant rise in recent years.

== Monuments and sightseeing ==
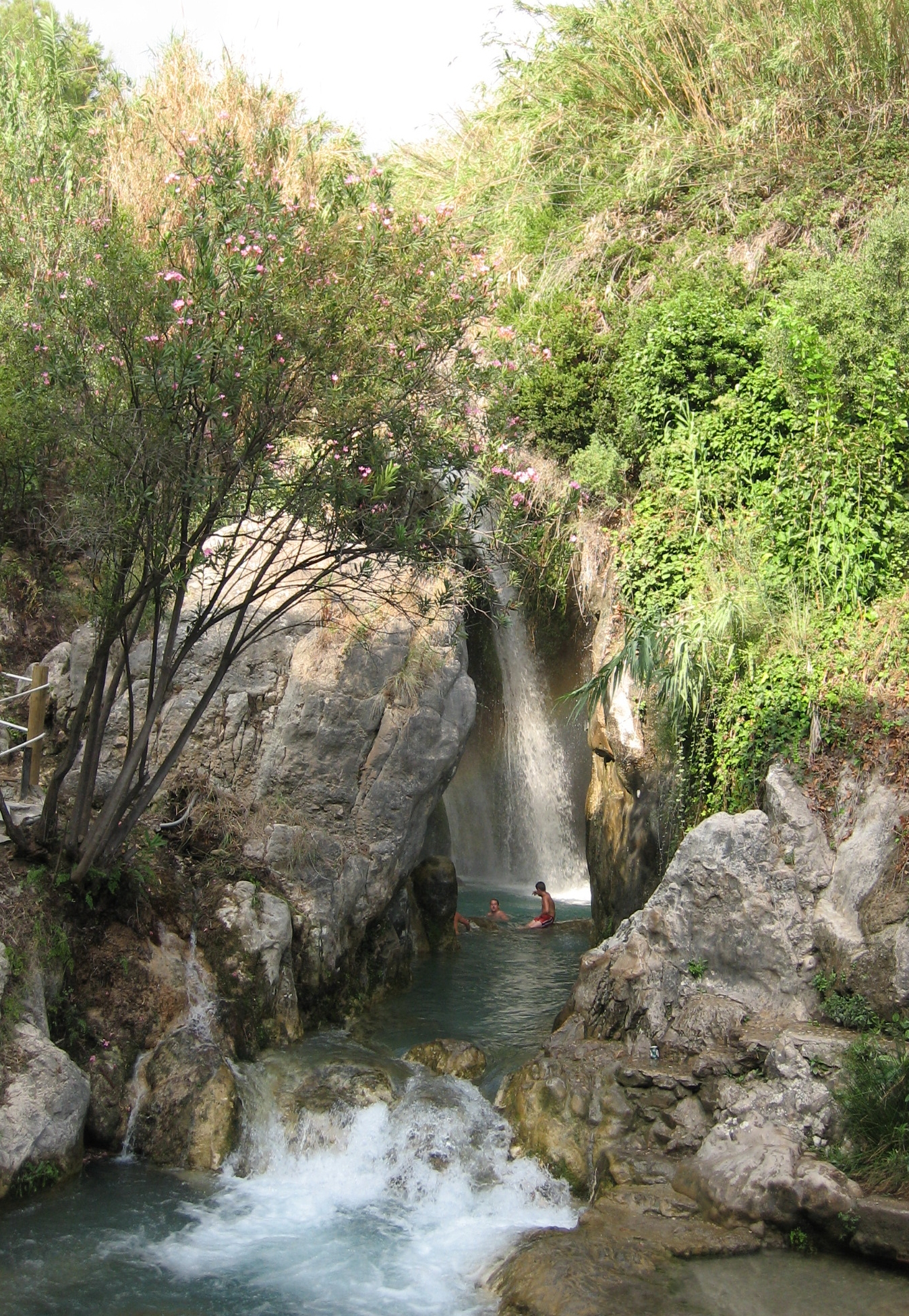
Waterfall in the Algar Waterfalls

=== Fonts de l’Algar ===
The Fonts de l’Algar (Algar Waterfalls) are at 3 km from the centre of Callosa, heading towards Bolulla, and Tàrbena. The Algar waterfalls form a natural park with an elevated grade of conservation of the ecological richness, and at the same time it has tourism and environment education services.

=== Fortalesa de Bèrnia ===
The Fortalesa de Bèrnia (Fortress of Bèrnia) was built in 1562 by the royal engineer Giovanni Battista Antonelli. It was a magnificent and clear exponent of the military architecture in the Renaissance epoch. King Philip II of Spain ordered its construction to face the Ottoman incursions on the coast. In 1612, because of its inefficiency and because it was far from the coast, it was demolished by order of Philip III of Spain. At the Fort you can still see the arches, the fosse, the bastion, the well and the wall remains. The wall measured 100 meters long and 100 meters wide. It has been considered as a Property of Culture Interest since 1997. The explanatory panels show the ancient running and use of the Fort.

=== El Poador de la Font Major ===
This is the old washing place and a water trough built in 1786 by the Town Council of Callosa d'en Sarrià. It used to have twelve spouts and the washing place was able to provide space for over seventy people. In 1910 the washing place was covered with a roof. Nowadays it is restored and it represents one of the most charismatic images of the town.

=== Sant Joan Baptista Church ===
The first data about the present church is from 1574, when the Parish Church was built. In 1578 it was inaugurated by Francisco de Mesa. An extension of the Church was considered during the second half of the 18th century. The construction of the crossing started in 1765 and ended in 178. In 1819 some works on the façade were made, the material used was marble from the local quarries, and they were finished in 1865. The upper part of the façade was made in 1917, but this time the material used was painted concrete emulating the marble.

=== Remains of the Castle wall ===
The first information about the castle dates from 1322, when Infant Don Pedro was given it by Bernat de Sarrià, Lord of Callosa, who might be the builder. It was successively owned by several Lords of Callosa such as the Moncada and the Bou Family until the late 17th century. At this point, it started to get ruined, and it finally disappeared in the early 18th century. Nowadays some remains of the castle wall can be admired by visitors.

== Fiestas ==
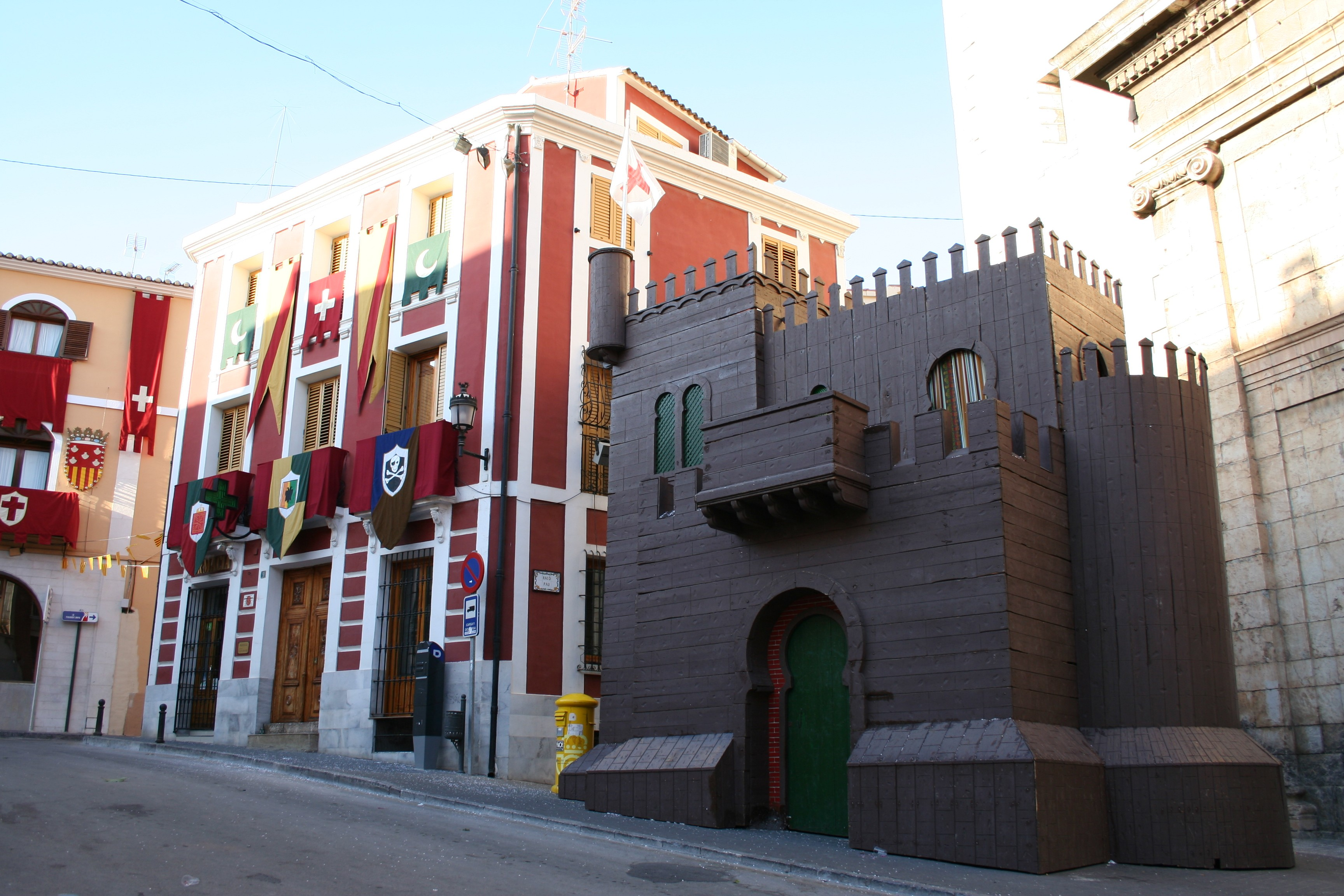
Plaza de España

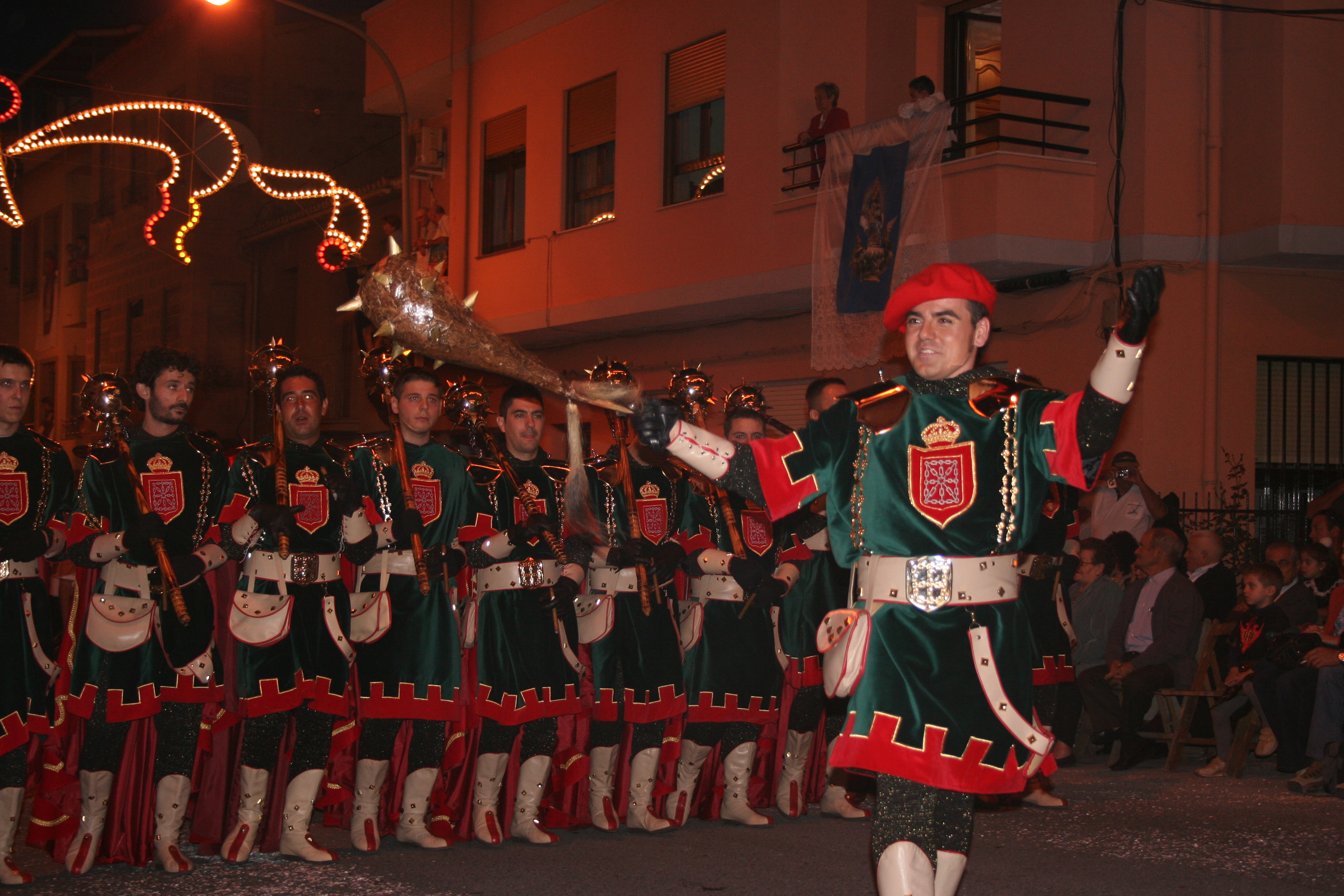
Moors and Christians of Callosa d'en Sarrià

- Festes de Sant Jaume. Les Danses de Sant Jaume, also known as La Festa del Fadrí are the oldest fiestas in the festivities of Callosa d'en Sarrià, as well as in the region. The historian Adolf Salvà dates the fiestas in 1819, when is the first written reference. Its origin, like many other celebrations, is pagan: possibly the dances were in honor of some god of the fertility. The festival is in honor of a saint, in this case Saint James. The festivals of Sant Jaume are not limited exclusively to the dances, they are also a few days of celebration in the streets, like: cucanyes (popular games), games of Calitx (a popular game with coins) of Valencian pilota, loquat, cake tasting, correguda del gall (Rooster race), etc.
- Moors and Christians. As a people with historical roots, since 1860 are held the second weekend in October, the celebrations of "Moors and Christians", are declared National Tourist Interest since 1985. They are celebrated in honor of the Virgen of injuries. Among the most spectacular acts, are the colorful parades Entrada Mora and Entrada Cristiana old dances preceded by Nanos, which accompany the Virgin during the procession.

The dance of the Nanos precedes the parade and represent the pagan festival.

== Gastronomy ==
The typical dishes of Callosa include:

- Crosta. A typical Carnival dish. It's made with dry rice and contains among other ingredients, sausages, covered with beaten egg, baked in clay pot.
- Minxos. Cover patties of chopped vegetables and fish.
- Putxero (or olla) amb pilotas. Typical dish from the festivities of Moros i Cristians. It's similar to Spanish stew, incorporating some balls stuffed with meat and blood and wrapped in cabbage leaves.
- Desserts, Referring to desserts, we highlight the pastissets d’aguardent i a l’aire, tiny cakes with liquor. And of course, the loquat in all its varieties (natural, in syrup, cakes and so on).

== Policy ==
Results of local elections on May 22, 2011
Party	candidate	Votes	%	Seats
PP	Juan Bautista Saval Ferrando	1.948	50,99	7
PSPV-PSOE	Alfonso Puigcerver Berenguer	1.038	27,17	3
BLOC-Compromís	Vicent Llobell Bertomeu	834	21,83	3
source: Generalitat Valenciana
