= Benifato =

- Municipality
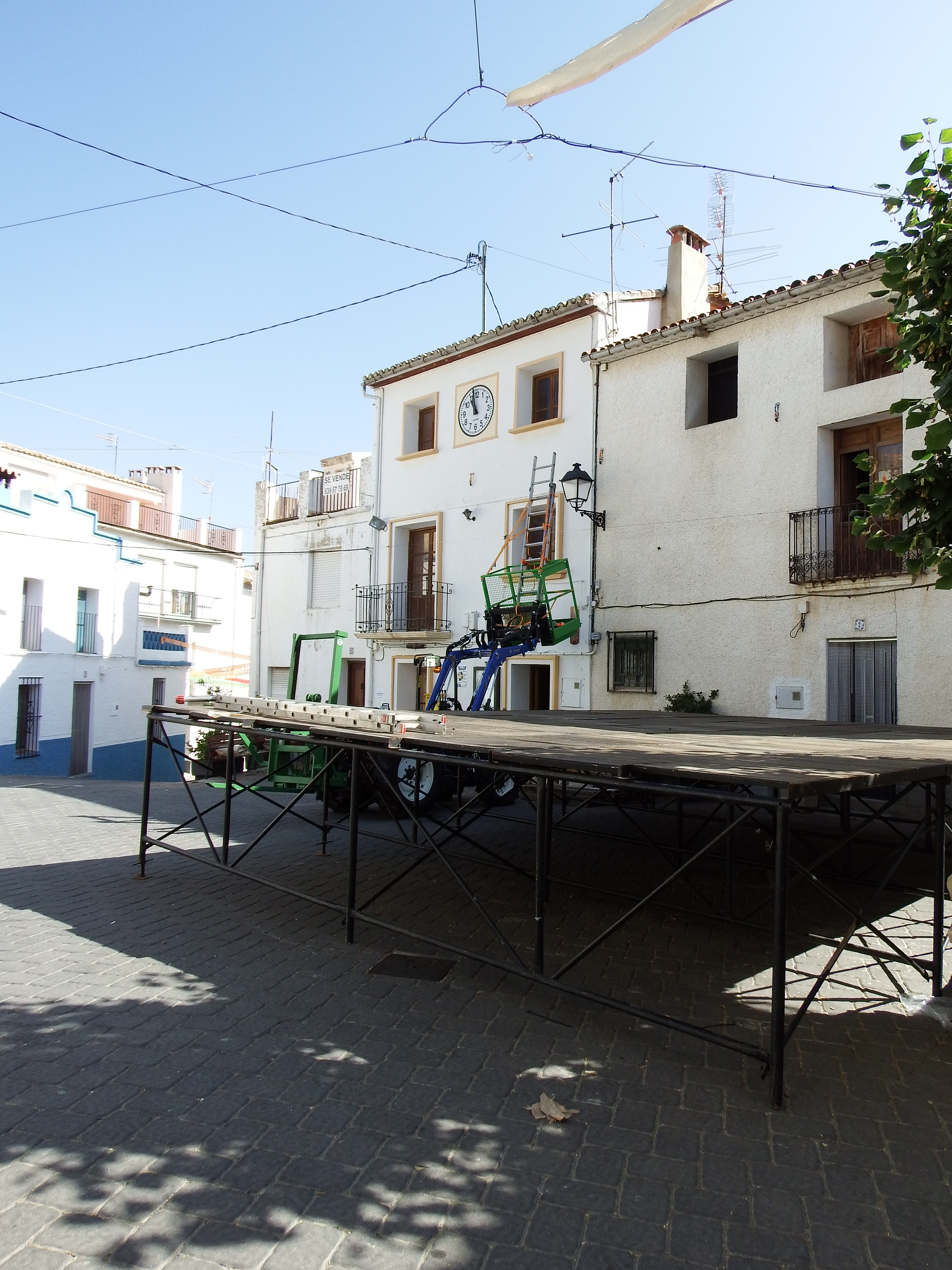
- Town hall

- Coat of arms

- Location in Spain
- Coordinates: 38°40′24″N 0°13′46″W
- Country: Spain
- Autonomous community: Valencian Community
- Province: Alicante
- Comarca: Marina Baixa
- Judicial district: Villajoyosa

Government
  - Alcalde: Enrique Ponsoda Fracés (2003) (PP)

Area
  - Total: 11.90 km^{2} (4.59 sq mi)
- Elevation: 658 m (2,159 ft)

Population (2025-01-01)
  - Total: 162
  - Density: 13.6/km^{2} (35.3/sq mi)
- Demonym(s): Benifater, benifatera
- Time zone: UTC+1 (CET)
  - Summer (DST): UTC+2 (CEST)
- Postal code: 03517
- Official language(s): Valencian

Benifato (Valencian: [beniˈfato]; Spanish: [beniˈfato]) is a Valencian town and municipality located in the comarca of Marina Baixa, in the province of Alicante, Spain. Benifato has an area of 11.9 km² and, according to the 2002 census, a total population of 164 inhabitants. The economy of Benifato is exclusively based on agriculture (olives, almonds and medlars). The most important monument in the town is the Catholic church of Sant Miquel (Saint Michael).
