= Aitana (mountain) =

Mountain massif in Alicante, Spain

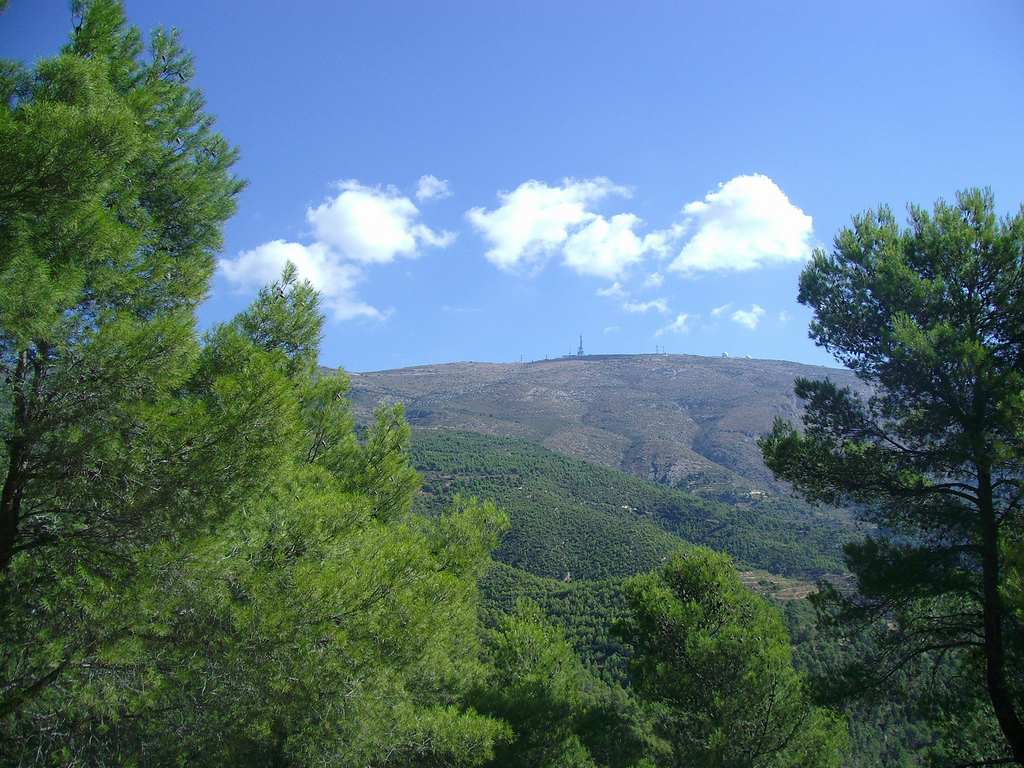
- Aitana peak and the antenna of EVA

Highest point
- Peak: Aitana
- Elevation: 1,558 m (5,112 ft)
- Prominence: 943 m (3,094 ft)
- Coordinates: 38°39′39″N 0°16′29″W

Dimensions
- Length: 8 km (5.0 mi) E/W
- Width: 3 km (1.9 mi) N/S
- Area: 20 km^{2} (7.7 mi^{2})

Geography
- Location within Spain
- Location: Marina Baixa, Alcoià and Comtat, Valencian Community
- Parent range: Baetic System

Geology
- Rock type: Limestone

Aitana (Valencian: [ajˈtana], Spanish: [ajˈtana]) is a mountain massif that is part of Prebaetic System in the eastern end of the Iberian Peninsula. Administratively, the mountainous area is located in the Marina Baixa, Alcoià and Comtat comarcas in the northern part of Alicante province, Valencian Community, Spain. Its peak at 1,558 metres above sea level is the highest point of the province.

== Geography ==
The Aitana mountain range is spread over an area of 2,000 hectares, about ten miles from the Mediterranean coast. Apart from Aitana, the highest peak that gives the name to the mountain system, other notable peaks are Penya Alta (1,506 m), Penya Catxa (1,467 m), El Mulero (1,308 m) and Alt del Carrascar (1,208 m).

The summit has also been the location of the finish line in the annual multi-stage bicycle race Vuelta a España a number of times. The Alto de Aitana is a 22.3 kilometer-long grinding ascension with an average gradient of 6% and can also be compared with Mount Ventoux, though Ventoux is steeper.

=== Ascent ===
There are some routes in order to climb the top. Visitors can go there almost year round except during irregular snowy periods during winter. One route is about 18 kilometers round-trip.

The route is divided into three stages:

Puerto Tudons - Font de l’Arbre. The font de l’Arbre can be reached by automobiles from Confrides. The route is 7 km on a narrow track.

Font de l’arbre - Font de la Forata. Can also be reached from Benifato.

The most spectacular part of the trail is the Font de Partagás - Pas de la rabossa - Summit of Aitana with a distance of 2 km. It starts at 1040 meters elevation, with almost 500 meters of uneven terrain. The path is well signposted with trail markings and distance signs.

The first section of just over 4 kilometers begins on the CV-770 with a long climb of 2.5 km. To the right are the walls of the Sierra de Aitana and to the left are pines and holly oaks, with panoramic views of the valley and the towns of Alcolecha and Ares del Bosque, as well as abandoned terraces.

A short descent leads to first stop: La Font de l’Arbre. The remains of snow reservoirs constructed of rock that were used for centuries to provide blocks of ice to the towns below.

La Font de l’Arbre is a recreational area with wooden tables, a barbecue grill and a source of fresh water. A few farmhouses and the refuge hostel can be seen from here.

The section from Font de l’Arbre to Font de la Forata is three kilometers of a continuous slight climb until just before reaching the Font de la Forata. The path runs between pine trees on one side and the walls of the mountains on the other.

La font de la Forata is a flat area with grass and some pipes where a stream of water runs down. From here can be seen the summit of Aitana with a tall antenna at the very top. A little further to the left is the Pas de La Rabosa. The trail passes through that cleft in the mountain. From here one can also get to Benifato by walking the PR-CV 21 pass.

The road from Font de la Forata to Pas de La Rabosa continues along the so-called Passet de La Rabosa botanical trail. Here are wooden sign boards that describe this micro-reserve of flora. The native plants that have evolved to adapt to blizzards and other rigors of the cold winters in this part of the mountains are notable. The pass is very close and climbs a little through the loose rocks fallen down the mountainside, easily but carefully; the other side of Aitana can be accessed through a small corridor, Pas de la Rabosa, between the rocks. From here the views are spectacular.

Aitana Pas de la Rabosa. We cross the pass and follow the path along some gorges, known as the chasms of Partagás, that form a natural spectacle. These cracks, 15 or 20 meters wide, can be more than 100 meters deep. They have been carved by the action of rain and melting snow – the combination of water and CO_{2} in the atmosphere forms the carbonic acid that dissolves the limestone rock.

=== Appearances in Vuelta a España (since 2001) ===
Year	Stage	Start of stage	Distance (km)	Category	Stage winner	Leader
2026	9	La Vila Joiosa/Villajoyosa	187.4	1	Enric Mas (ESP)	Enric Mas (ESP)
2016	20	Benidorm	184	HC	Pierre Latour (FRA)	Nairo Quintana (COL)
2009	8	Alzira	204.7	HC	Damiano Cunego (ITA)	Cadel Evans (AUS)
2004	9	Xàtiva	170	HC	Leonardo Piepoli (ITA)	Floyd Landis (USA)
2001	15	Valencia	207.2	HC	Claus Michael Møller (DEN)	Óscar Sevilla (ESP)

== See also ==
- Mountains of the Valencian Community
