= L'Alfàs del Pi =

L'Alfàs del Pi Alfaz del Pi
- Municipality
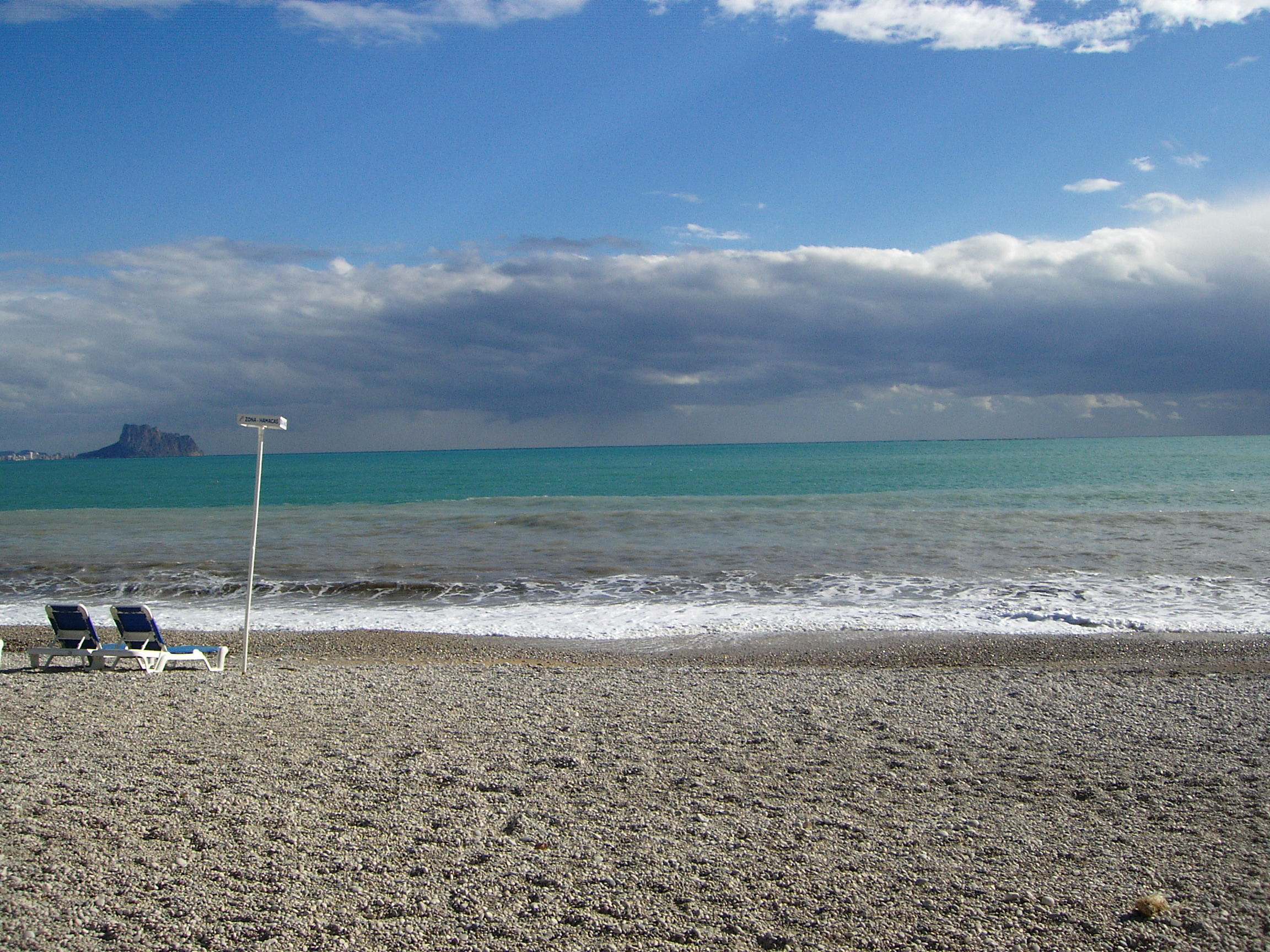
- Racó de l'Albir beach in L'Alfàs del Pi

- Coat of arms

- Location in Spain
- Coordinates: 38°34′48″N 0°6′11″W
- Country: Spain
- Autonomous community: Valencian Community
- Province: Alicante / Alacant
- Comarca: Marina Baixa
- Judicial district: Benidorm

Government
  - Mayor: Vicente Arques (2007) (PSPV-PSOE)

Area
  - Total: 19.26 km^{2} (7.44 sq mi)
- Elevation: 88 m (289 ft)

Population (2025-01-01)
  - Total: 21,080
  - Density: 1,094/km^{2} (2,835/sq mi)
- Demonym(s): alfassí, -ina (Val.) alfasino, -a (Sp.)
- Time zone: UTC+1 (CET)
  - Summer (DST): UTC+2 (CEST)
- Postal code: 03580–03581
- Official language(s): Spanish and Valencian
- Website: www.lalfas.com

L'Alfàs del Pi (Valencian: [lalˈfaz ðel ˈpi]; Spanish: Alfaz del Pi [alˈfaθ ðel ˈpi]) is a Valencian town and municipality located in the comarca of Marina Baixa, in the province of Alicante, Spain, lying at the foot of Serra Gelada.

L'Alfàs del Pi has an area of 19.3 km^{2} and, according to the 2011 census, a total population of 19,802 inhabitants; the latest official estimate (as at 2019) is 20,482. As of 2005, the town had the second largest concentration of Norwegian residents abroad, along with sizable Dutch and English communities. The economy of L'Alfàs del Pi is mainly based on tourism. The most important monument in the city is the Catholic church of Crist del Bon Encert, built in 1784. The town's symbol is a pine tree, which can be found in the church square. It is home to a nationally renowned film festival which runs each year.

L'Alfàs del Pi has created a planned sea-side community - Platja de l'Albir - situated between Benidorm to the south and Altea to the north in fields earlier dominated by citrus and almond groves. Since 1995, Albir has grown into a village of about 5,000 inhabitants, into a municipality with over 20,000 inhabitants; the majority of whom are originally from Northern Europe.

L'Alfàs del Pi has a high amount of foreign-born residents, having a higher percentage of foreign residents than Spanish residents. The largest foreign population are Norwegians, who have two public Norwegian schools, paid by the Norwegian government, two elder care centres for Norwegians and the only volunteering centre opened by the Norwegian government outside of Norway.

In 2013, the sculpture Paraboloide by Agustín Ibarrola that symbolizes peace and was made in honor of the 2011 Norway Attacks victims was revealed. The sculpture is placed in a park that will be named after Johan Galtung.
