= Benimantell =

- Municipality
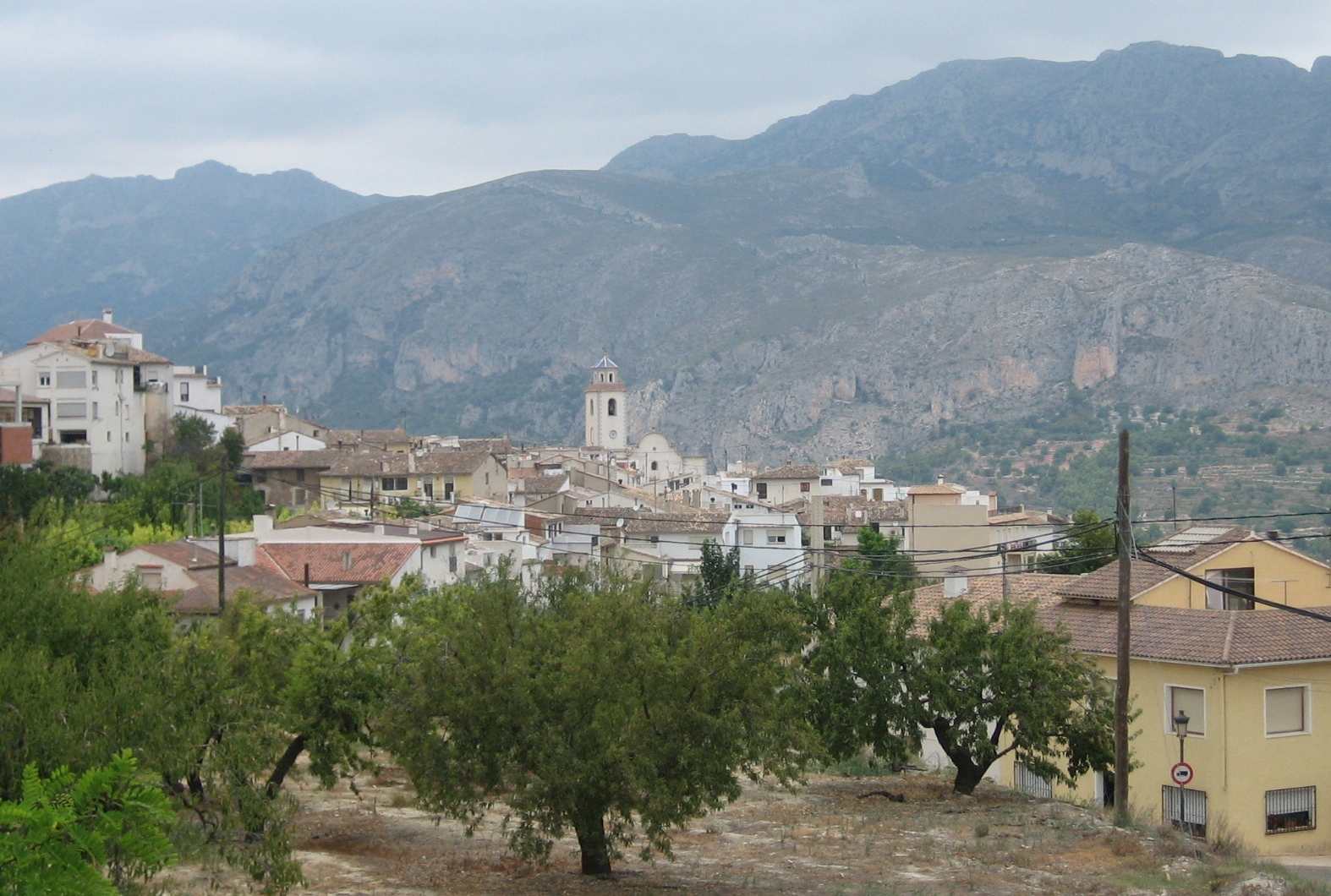

- Coat of arms

- Location in Spain
- Coordinates: 38°40′45″N 0°21′33″W
- Country: Spain
- Autonomous community: Valencian Community
- Province: Alicante
- Comarca: Marina Baixa
- Judicial district: Villajoyosa/La Vila Joiosa

Government
  - Alcalde: Felipe Miralles Solbes (2007) (PSPV-PSOE)

Area
  - Total: 37.90 km^{2} (14.63 sq mi)
- Elevation: 547 m (1,795 ft)

Population (2025-01-01)
  - Total: 548
  - Density: 14.5/km^{2} (37.4/sq mi)
- Demonym(s): Benimantellut, benimantelluda
- Time zone: UTC+1 (CET)
  - Summer (DST): UTC+2 (CEST)
- Postal code: 03516
- Official language(s): Valencian

Benimantell (Valencian: [benimanˈteʎ], Spanish: [benimanˈtel]) is a Valencian town and municipality located in the comarca of Marina Baixa, in the province of Alicante, Spain. Benimantell has an area of 37.9 km^{2} and, according to the 2002 census, a total population of 378 inhabitants. The economy of Benimantell is exclusively based on agriculture (almonds and olives). The most important monument in the town is the Catholic church of Sant Vicent Màrtir, with a hexagonal tower.
