= Beniardà =

Beniardà Beniardà (Valencian) Beniardá (Spanish)
- Municipality
- Coat of arms

- Location in Spain
- Coordinates: 38°41′00″N 0°13′00″W
- Country: Spain
- Autonomous community: Valencian Community
- Province: Alicante
- Comarca: Marina Baixa
- Judicial district: Villajoyosa/La Vila Joiosa

Government
  - Alcalde: César Vicedo Bou (2005) (PP)

Area
  - Total: 15.74 km^{2} (6.08 sq mi)
- Elevation: 464 m (1,522 ft)

Population (2025-01-01)
  - Total: 226
  - Density: 14.4/km^{2} (37.2/sq mi)
- Demonym(s): Beniarder, beniardera
- Time zone: UTC+1 (CET)
  - Summer (DST): UTC+2 (CEST)
- Postal code: 03517
- Official language(s): Valencian

Beniardà (Valencian: [beniaɾˈða]; Spanish: Beniardá [benjaɾˈða]) is a municipality in the comarca of Marina Baixa in the Valencian Community, Spain.

The economy of Beniardà is exclusively based on agriculture. The most important monument in the town is the Catholic church of Sant Joan Baptista, built in the 16th century.

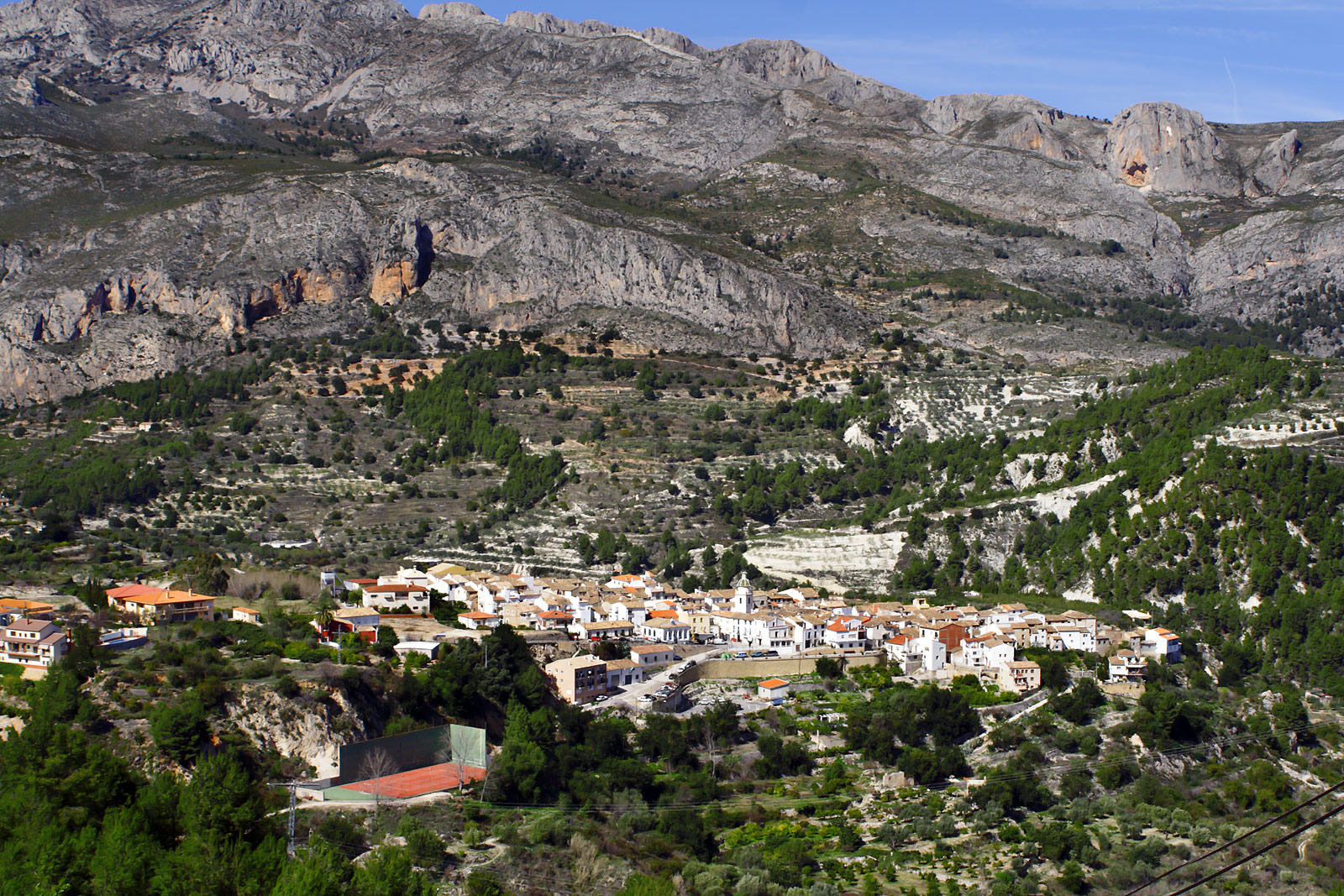
Beniardà
