= Marina Baixa =

Coordinates: 38.6005°N 0.214919°W

Marina Baixa Marina Baja
- Comarca
- Country: Spain
- Autonomous community: Valencian Community
- Province: Alacant / Alicante
- Capital: La Vila Joiosa / Villajoyosa
- Municipalities: 18 municipalities: Benidorm, La Vila Joiosa / Villajoyosa, Altea, L'Alfàs del Pi, La Nucia, Callosa d'En Sarrià, Finestrat, Polop, Relleu, Orxeta, Tàrbena, Sella, Benimantell, Bolulla, Confrides, Beniardà, El Castell de Guadalest, Benifato

Area
  - Total: 605.15 km^{2} (233.65 sq mi)

Population (2019)
  - Total: 188,623
  - Density: 311.70/km^{2} (807.29/sq mi)
- Time zone: UTC+1 (CET)
  - Summer (DST): UTC+2 (CEST)
- Most populated municipality: Benidorm

Marina Baixa (Valencian: [maˈɾina ˈbajʃa]; Spanish: Marina Baja [maˈɾina ˈβaxa]; lit. "Lower Marina") is a comarca in the Valencian Community, Spain. It is bordered by the comarques of Comtat on the northwest, Marina Alta on the northeast, Alacantí and Alcoià on the west and the Mediterranean Sea on the east. Marina Baixa and Marina Alta are commonly referred as Les Marines.

The interior of this comarca is mountainous, and it is dominated by the Serra d'Aitana whose highest peak is 1,500 m. The local fauna is composed by eagles, hawks, crows, blackbirds, swallows, foxes, wildcats, wild boars and many smaller animals. Rosemaries, pines, medlars and carobtrees are commonplace flora. The terrain is calcareous, so the landscape shows impressive caves and natural archways and fountains.

Tourism is the main economic resource. Fruit trees (especially orange and lemon trees), olive and almond trees are cultivated. The population of this comarca strongly increased in the last twenty years.

== Municipalities ==
The comarca of la Marina Baixa comprises 18 municipalities, listed below with their areas and populations:

| Name | Area in km^{2} | Population (2001) | Population (2011) | Population (2019) |
|---|---|---|---|---|
| L'Alfàs del Pi | 19.3 | 11,103 | 19,802 | 20,482 |
| Altea | 34.4 | 15,910 | 22,385 | 22,290 |
| Beniardà | 15.7 | 245 | 209 | 232 |
| Benidorm | 38.5 | 51,873 | 68,045 | 68,721 |
| Benifato | 11.9 | 166 | 193 | 140 |
| Benimantell | 37.9 | 402 | 483 | 483 |
| Bolulla | 13.6 | 358 | 408 | 420 |
| Callosa d'en Sarrià | 34.7 | 7,057 | 7,653 | 7,373 |
| El Castell de Guadalest | 40.0 | 180 | 227 | 217 |
| Confrides | 42.2 | 309 | 283 | 187 |
| Finestrat | 42.5 | 2,307 | 6,099 | 6,715 |
| La Nucia | 21.4 | 6,587 | 17,096 | 18,603 |
| Orxeta | 24.1 | 528 | 875 | 736 |
| Polop | 22.6 | 2,300 | 4,159 | 4,965 |
| Relleu | 76.9 | 800 | 1,208 | 1,160 |
| Sella | 38.7 | 591 | 607 | 580 |
| Tàrbena | 31.7 | 715 | 721 | 646 |
| La Vila Joiosa / Villajoyosa | 59.2 | 23,657 | 32,649 | 34,673 |
| Totals | 605.3 | 125,088 | 183,102 | 188,623 |

Municipalities of Marina Baixa
