= Bolulla =

- Municipality
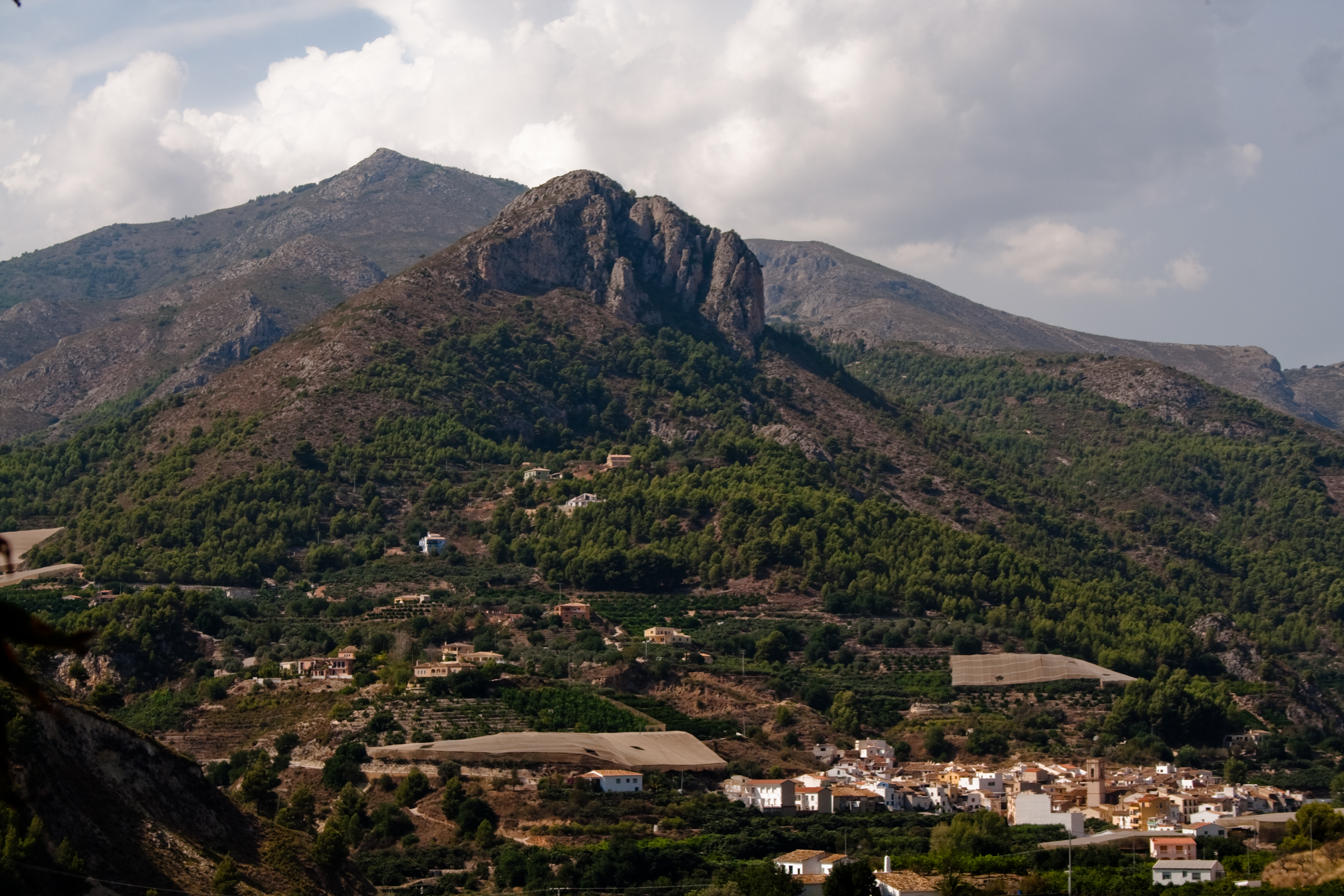

- Flag Coat of arms

- Location in Spain
- Coordinates: 38°40′35″N 0°6′44″W
- Country: Spain
- Autonomous community: Valencian Community
- Province: Alicante
- Comarca: Marina Baixa
- Judicial district: Villajoyosa/La Vila Joiosa

Government
  - Alcalde: Andrés Ferrer Ruiz (2003) (PSPV-PSOE)

Area
  - Total: 13.60 km^{2} (5.25 sq mi)
- Elevation: 214 m (702 ft)

Population (2025-01-01)
  - Total: 490
  - Density: 36/km^{2} (93/sq mi)
- Demonym(s): Boluller, bolullera
- Time zone: UTC+1 (CET)
  - Summer (DST): UTC+2 (CEST)
- Postal code: 03518
- Official language(s): Valencian

Bolulla (Valencian pronunciation: [boˈluʎa]) is a Valencian town and municipality located in the comarca of Marina Baixa, in the province of Alicante, Spain. Bolulla has an area of 13.6 km^{2} and, according to the Spanish National Statistics Institute, a total population of 421 inhabitants at 1 January 2014 (of which 241 Spaniards and 180 foreigners). The economy of Bolulla is exclusively based on agriculture. The most important monument in the town is the Catholic church of Sant Josep (Saint Joseph), built in the 18th century.
