= Orxeta =

- Municipality
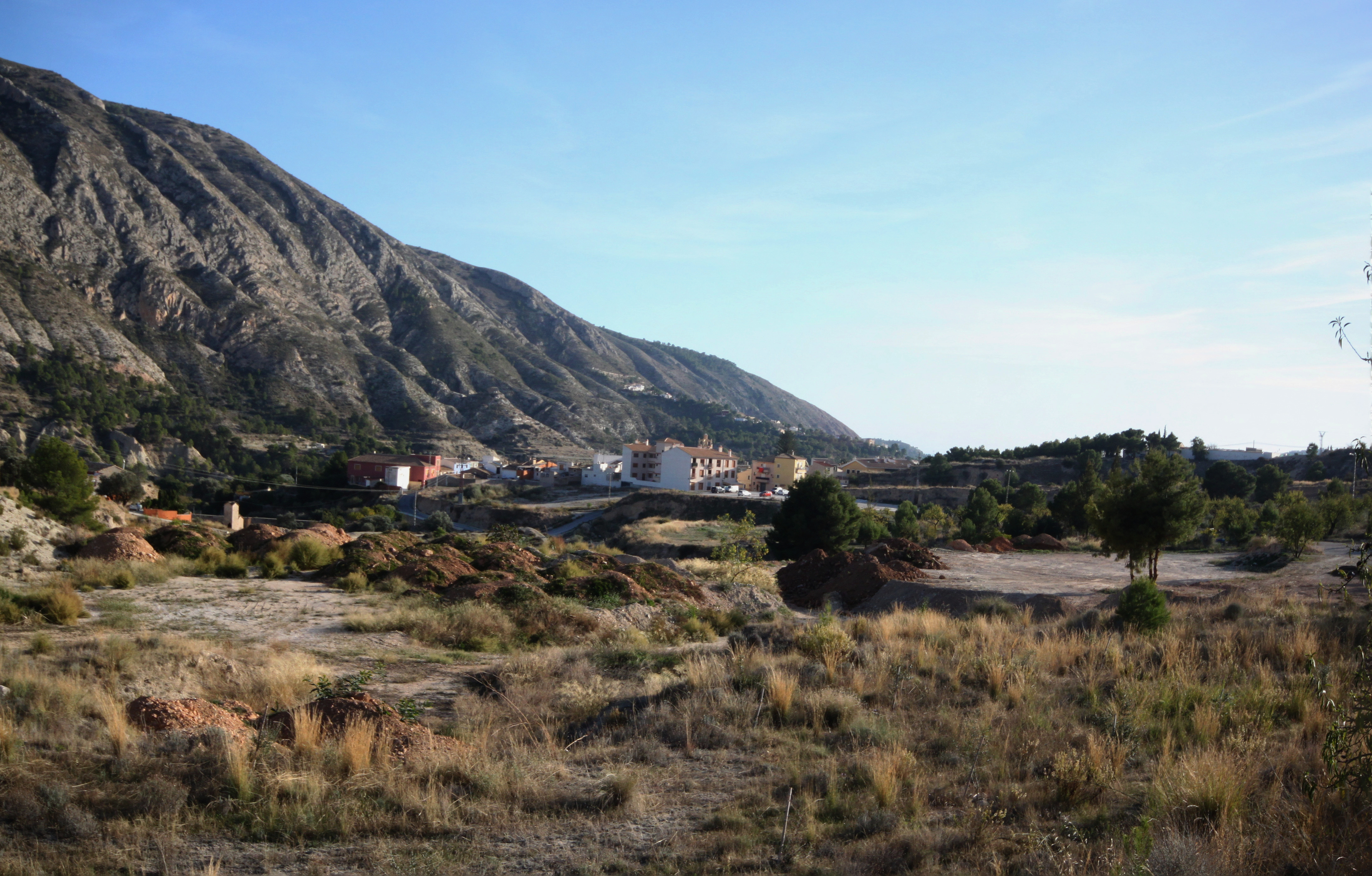
- View of Orxeta

- Coat of arms

- Location of Altura. Orxeta (Valencian Community)
- Coordinates: 38.563°N 0.262°W
- Country: Spain
- Community: Valencia
- Province: Alicante
- Comarca: Marina Baixa

Government
  - Mayor: Jaime Lloret

Area
  - Total: 24.06 km^{2} (9.29 sq mi)

Population (2023)
  - Total: 840
  - Density: 35/km^{2} (90/sq mi)
- Demonym: Orxetà/Orxetana
- Time zone: UTC+1 (CET)
  - Summer (DST): UTC+2 (CEST)
- Postal code: 03579
- Website: www.orxeta.es

Orxeta (Valencian: [oɾˈtʃeta], Spanish: Orcheta) is a small town and municipality in the comarca of Marina Baixa in the Valencian Community, Spain.
