= Sella, Spain =

Municipality in the comarca of Marina Baixa in Spain

Coordinates: 38°36′N 0°16′W

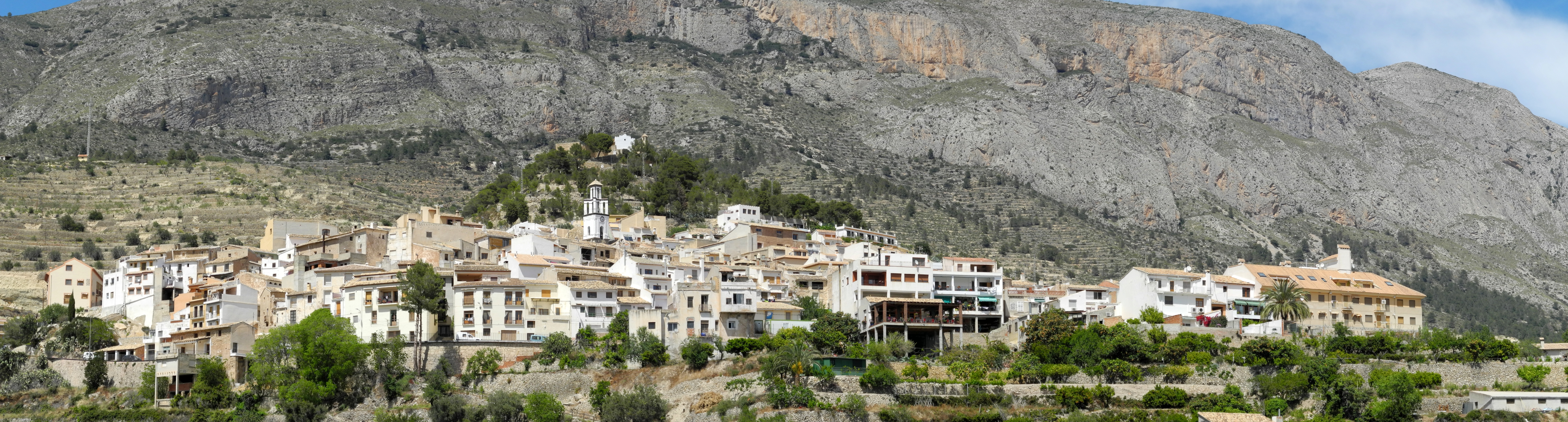
View of Sella

Sella's coat of arms

Sella (Valencian pronunciation: [ˈseʎa]) is a municipality in the comarca of Marina Baixa in the province of Alicante, Spain. Every year the first weekend of October Sella celebrates its Festa Major; Festes de l'Aurora.

== Description ==
Sella has one of the most important climbing areas in the Valencian Community, with a lot of high quality limestone rock and hundreds of bolted routes.
