= Tàrbena =

Tàrbena Tàrbena
- Municipality
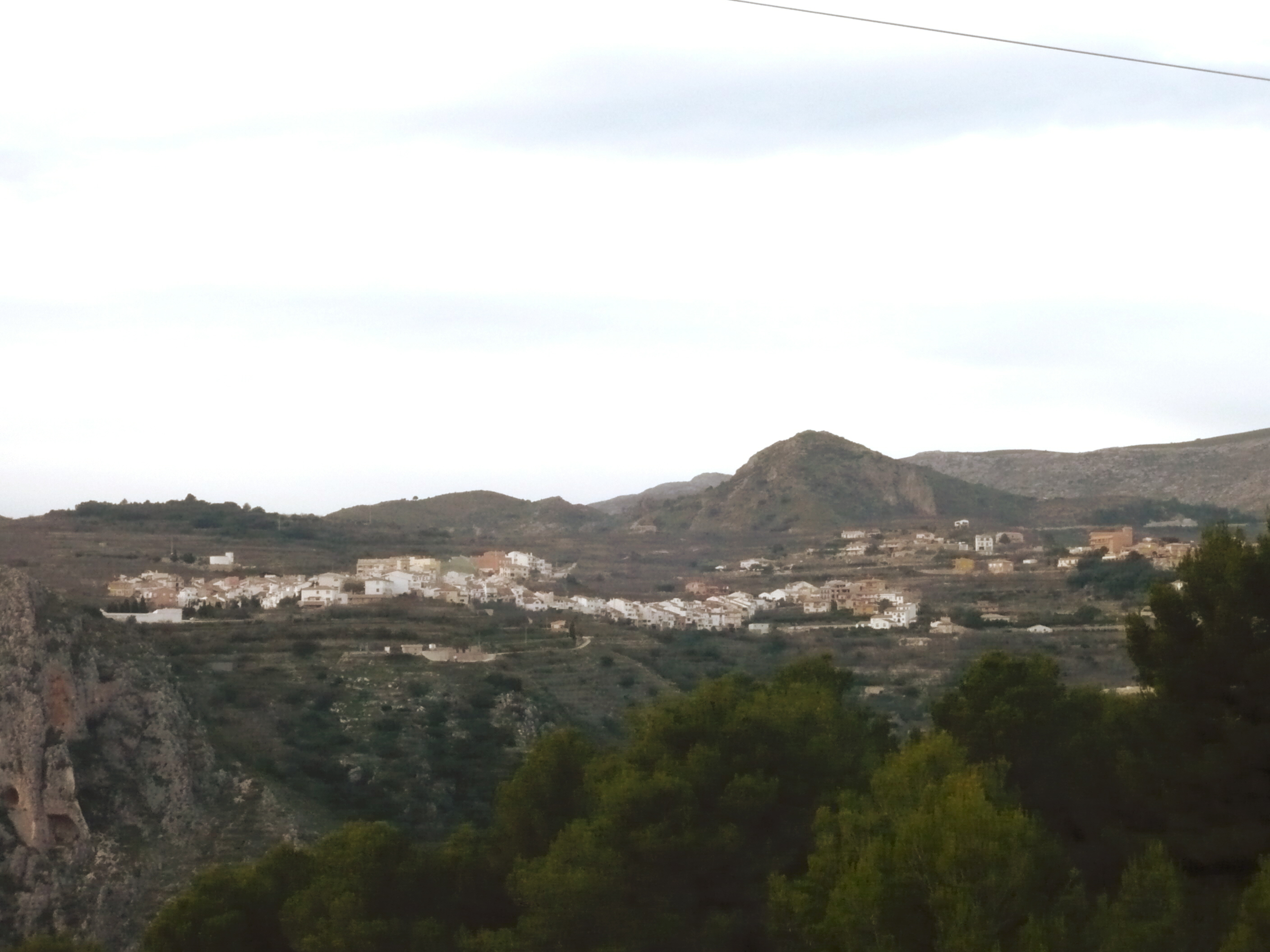

- Coat of arms

- Location within Spain Location within Valencian Community Location within Europe
- Coordinates: 38°41′42″N 0°06′03″W
- Country: Spain
- Autonomous Community: Valencian Community
- Province: Alicante
- Comarca: Marina Baixa

Government
  - Type: Mayor-council government
  - Body: Ajuntament de Tàrbena
  - Mayor: José Francisco Signes Mascaró (2011) (PP)

Area
  - Total: 31.67 km^{2} (12.23 sq mi)
- Elevation: 560 m (1,840 ft)

Population (2025-01-01)
  - Total: 662
  - Density: 20.9/km^{2} (54.1/sq mi)
- Demonym(s): tarbenero, -ra (es) tarbener, -ra (va)
- Time zone: CET (GMT +1)
  - Summer (DST): CEST (GMT +2)
- Postcode: 03518
- Website: City Hall of Tàrbena

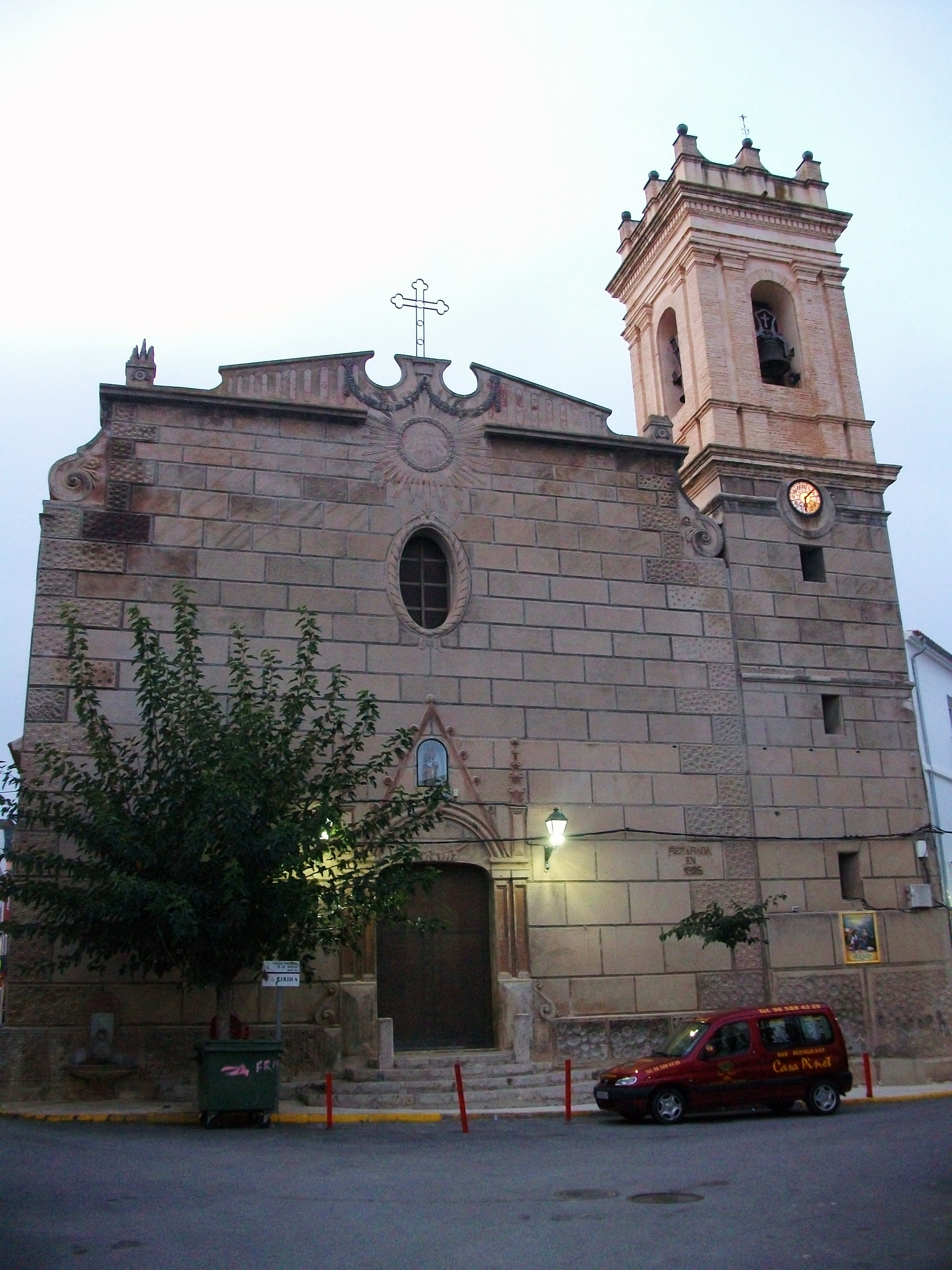
The church of St Barbara

Tàrbena (Valencian pronunciation: [ˈtaɾbena], Spanish: Tárbena) is a municipality in the comarca of Marina Baixa, Alicante, Valencia, Spain.

== History ==
It had been subjected to religious de-population and later re-population by an entirely different race of people. At the time of the Spanish Inquisition it was abandoned when the mostly Moorish population ran away.

It was re-populated by impoverished natives of Mallorca, who took over the tumbledown ruins and turned it into a village. A Valencian shipping magnate in whose ducal domain the mountain territory of Tarbena belonged, was involved in considerable livestock trade between the mainland and the Balearic islands. Ferrying pigs on the outboard journey, he often brought back the offal produced for a profit. Mallorcan black pudding was a sought after delicacy in Valencia, being quite distinct from local varieties. Then it occurred to him that if he put Mallorcans in one of his abandoned villages and got them to make the black pudding there, he could save the cost of transport and collect rents as well. So he then shipped a cargo of pigs out and a cargo of sausage-maker artisans back, took them up into the hills, showed them the empty village and gave it to them for free. They were a hardy lot and soon a cottage industry producing all manner of pig puddings and sausages; black, red and white, was flourishing. They still exist today, making butifarras, blanquets and sobrassada.
