= Villajoyosa =

Villajoyosa la Vila Joiosa
- Town and municipality
- la Vila Joiosa / Villajoyosa (official)
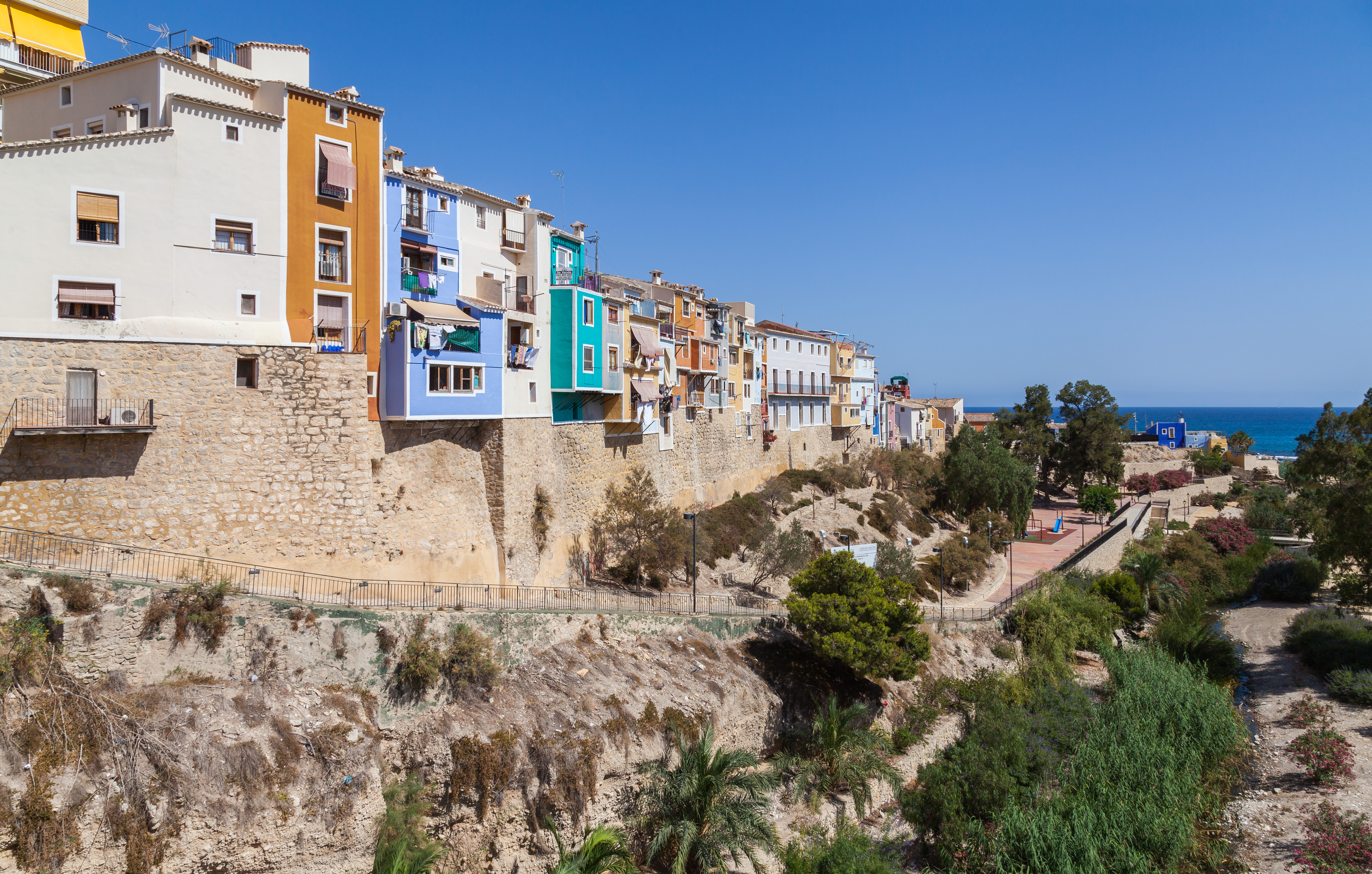

- Flag Coat of arms
- Nickname: la Vila
- Location of la Vila Joiosa / Villajoyosa
- Location within Province of Alicante Location within Valencian Community Location within Spain
- Coordinates: 38°30′19″N 0°13′58″W
- Country: Spain
- Autonomous community: Valencian Community
- Province: Alacant / Alicante
- Comarca: Marina Baixa
- Judicial district: la Vila Joiosa / Villajoyosa

Government
  - Alcalde (Mayor): Marcos Enrique Zaragoza Mayor (PPCV)

Area
  - Total: 20.45 km^{2} (7.90 sq mi)
- Elevation: 27 m (89 ft)

Population (2025-01-01)
  - Total: 37,449
  - Density: 1,831/km^{2} (4,743/sq mi)
- Demonyms: • viler, -a (Val.) • vilero/a (Sp.); Also jonense (locally, in disuse)
- Official language(s): Valencian; Spanish
- Linguistic area: Valencian
- Time zone: UTC+1 (CET)
  - Summer (DST): UTC+2 (CEST)
- Postal code: 03570
- Website: www.villajoyosa.com

Villajoyosa, (Note: Pronunciation of Villajoyosa: Spanish: [biʎaxoˈʝosa]) in Spanish, or la Vila Joiosa, (Note: Pronunciation of la Vila Joiosa: Valencian: [la ˈvila dʒoˈjoza]) in Valencian (officially la Vila Joiosa / Villajoyosa), both meaning "The Joyful Town", is a coastal town and municipality in the south of the Valencian Community, Spain, by the Mediterranean Sea. It is the historic and administrative capital of Marina Baixa region, and is located in the province of Alicante (Alacant). The town is known locally simply as la Vila.

== Geography ==
It is the historic and administrative capital of the comarca of Marina Baixa and is located 32 km from the city of Alicante, in the coastal area known as Costa Blanca (White Coast). It has over three kilometers of beaches, including the Platja Centre (Central Beach), close to the town center. The river of la Vila (incorrectly also known as Amadòrio) runs through the town.

== Transport ==
Access to la Vila Joiosa / Villajoyosa can be either through the expressway N-332, the motorway AP-7 or also through the Alicante Metropolitan TRAM Line 1.

== Attractions ==
The area is famous for its chocolate industry and tourism. One of the most popular tourist attractions is its Gothic Catholic Church of the Assumption, with a Baroque altar piece. Another popular destination, the Royal Palm Casino (formerly Casino Costa Blanca), is reopened after major renovation. The town's festival of Moros i Cristians (Moors and Christians), celebrated at the end of July, was declared an International Tourist Interest Festival. Currently, this festivity commemorates a boat landing from the Berber pirates that was repelled by the population of the town.

== Appearance ==
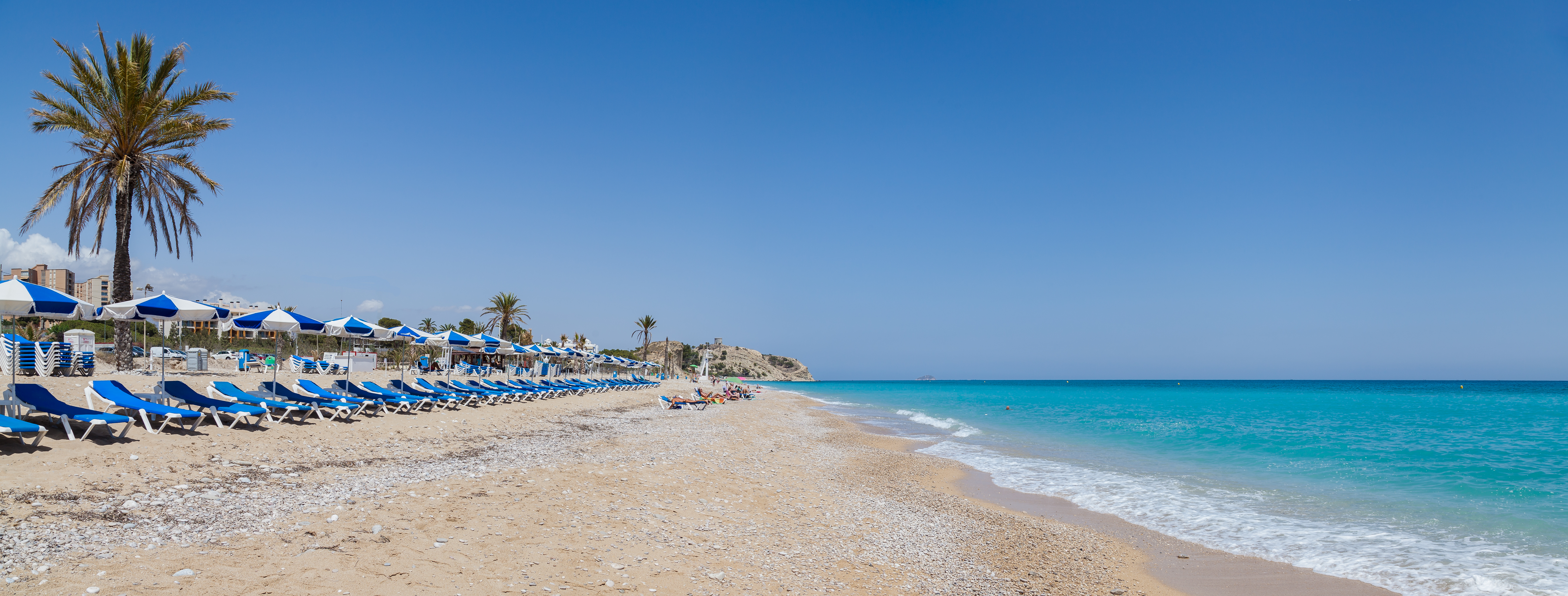
Platja del Paradís in la Vila Joiosa, by the Mediterranean Sea.

== Notable people ==
- Marta Baldó, rhythmic gymnast and Olympic Champion (1996, Atlanta)
- José Catalá, footballer
- Lucía Cortez Llorca, tennis player
- Maisa Lloret, rhythmic gymnast
- Felipe Orts, road and cyclo-cross cyclist
- Maxim Kuzminov, Russian defector and helicopter pilot found dead in Villajoyosa
- Anthony Jung, footballer who was born in Villajoyosa, Spain, to a German mother and Spanish father. He emigrated at the age of three with his divorced mother to Germany.

== Twin towns ==
- Vitré, Ille-et-Vilaine, France, since 1989
- Quesada, Spain, since 2006
- Bullas, Spain, since 2006
