= List of Bienes de Interés Cultural in the Province of Alicante =

This is a list of Bien de Interés Cultural landmarks in the Province of Alicante, Spain.

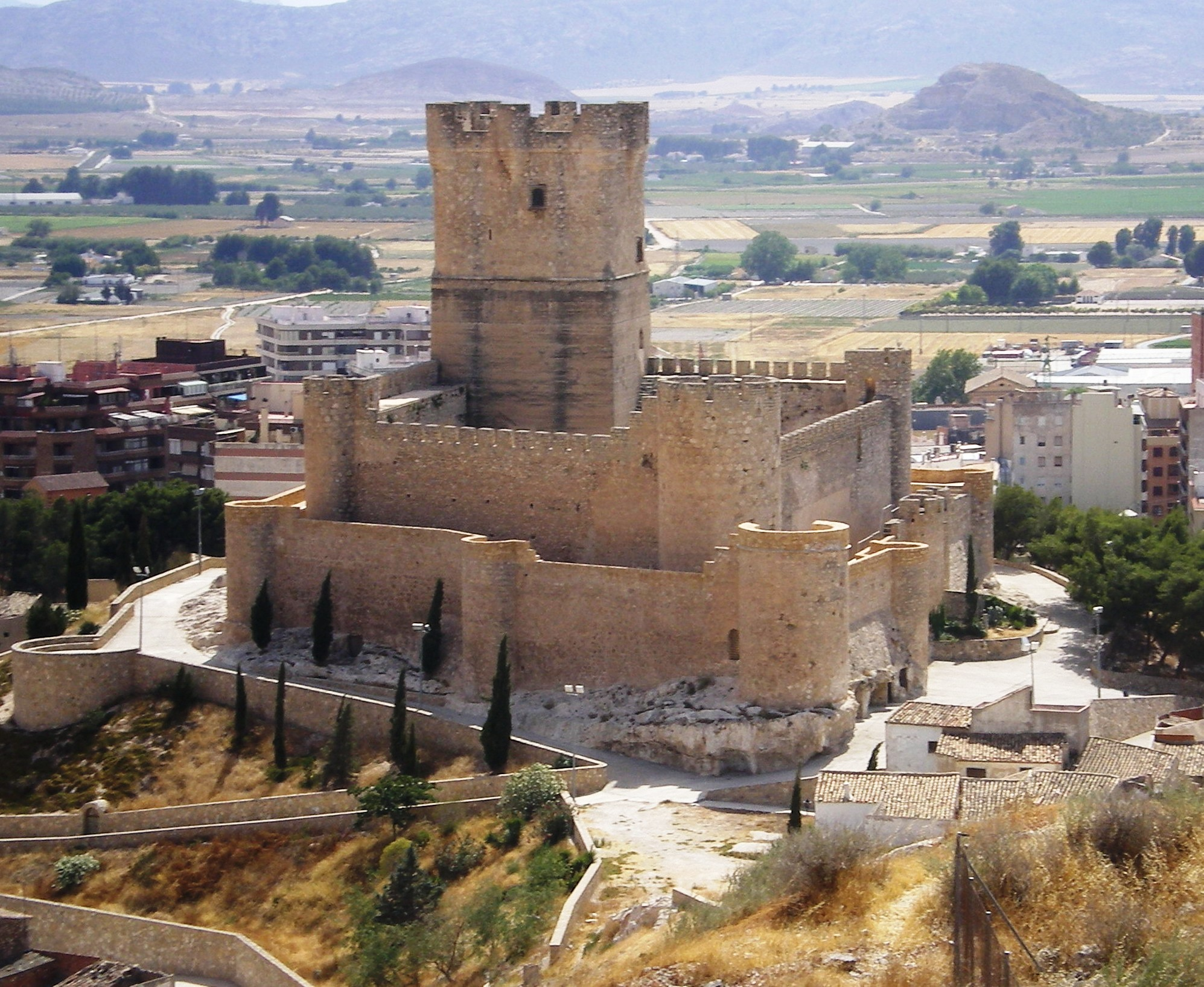
The Atalaya Castle.

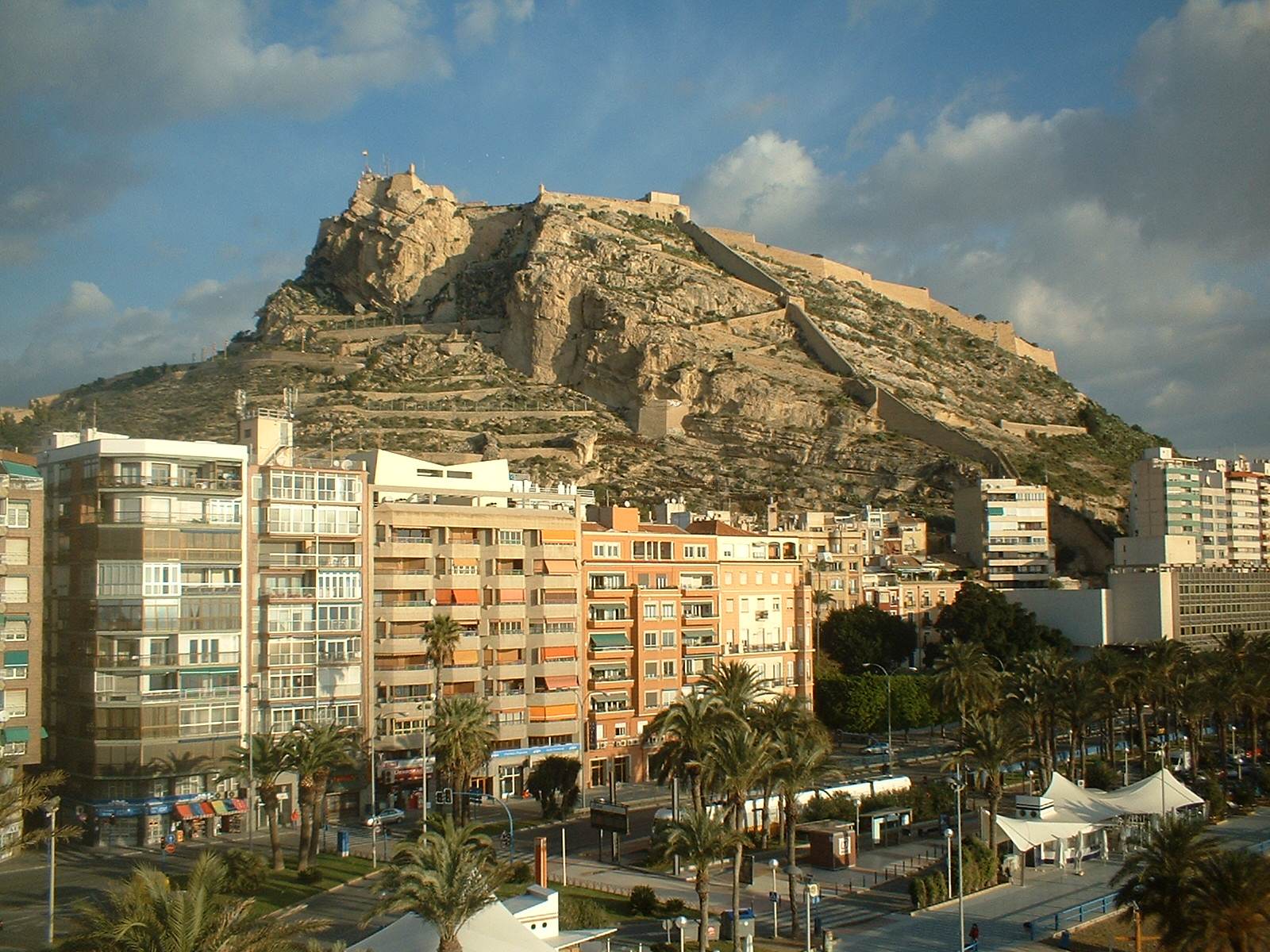
Mount Benacantil and the Santa Bárbara Castle, 2005

- Archaeological Museum of Alicante
- Atalaya Castle
- Barxell Castle
- Basilica of Santa Maria, Alicante
- Castillo de Forna
- Castle of Banyeres
- Castle of Biar
- Church of St Martin, Callosa de Segura
- Concatedral de San Nicolás, Alicante
- Cocentaina Castle
- Lucentum
- Archaeological Museum Camil Visedo
- Misteri d'Elx
- Orihuela
- Orihuela Cathedral
- Palace of the Counts of Cocentaina
- Palmeral of Elche
- San Jorge Bridge
- Santa Bárbara Castle
- Tibi Dam
