= Treaty of Almizra =

1244 treaty between Aragon and Castile

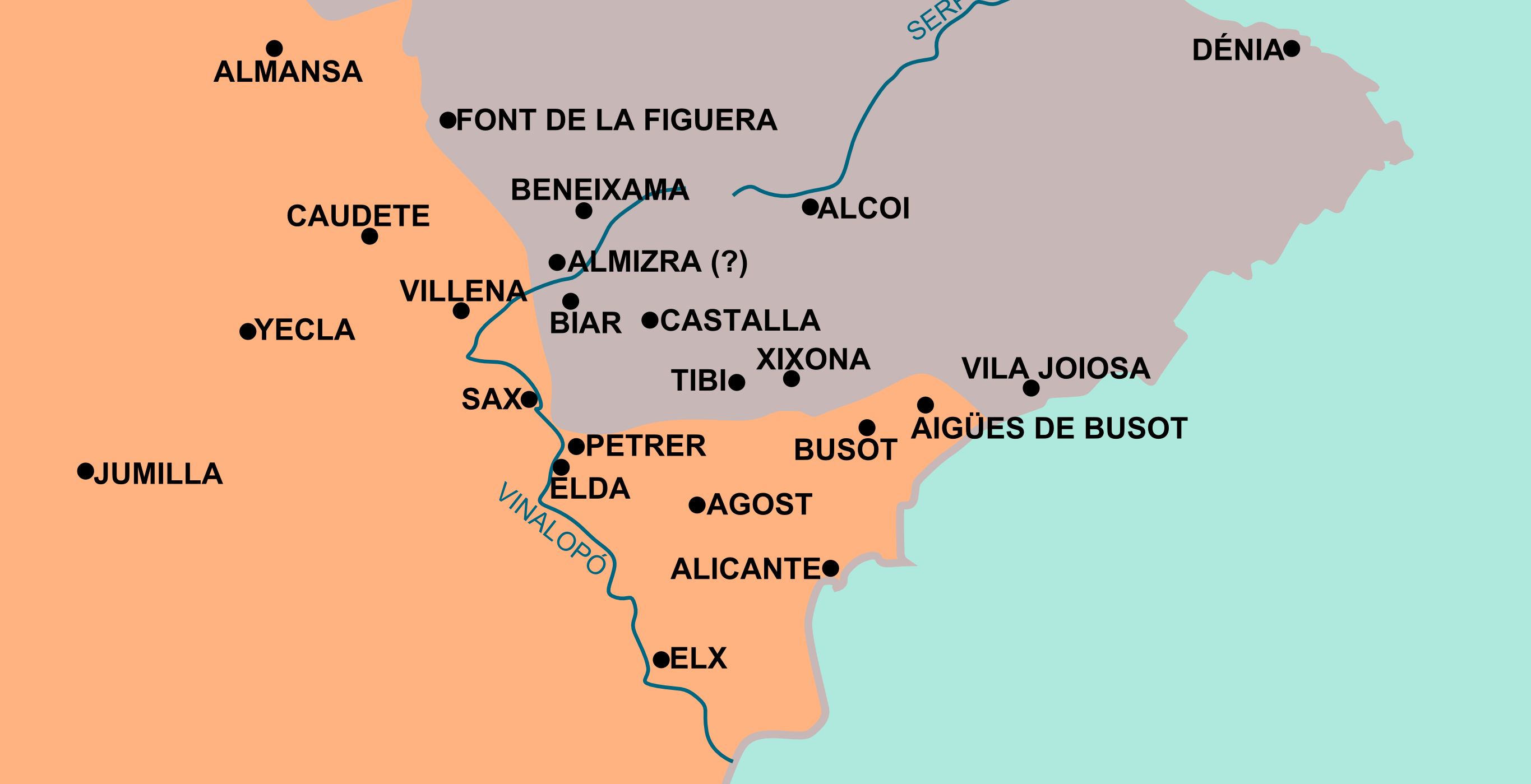
Limits of the Treaty of Almizra.

The Treaty of Almizra (or Treaty of Almiçra) was the third of a series of three treaties between the Crown of Aragon and Crown of Castile meant to determine the limits of their expansion into Al-Andalus so as to prevent squabbling between the Christian princes. Specifically, it defined the borders of the Kingdom of Valencia. James I of Aragon signed it on 26 March 1244, but Alfonso X of Castile did not affirm it until much later. According to the treaty, all lands south of a line from Biar to Villajoyosa through Busot were reserved for Castile. This ended most further Aragonese expansion on the Iberian peninsula.

The treaty succeeded those of Tudilén and Cazorla, which were constantly breached. The clause by which neither party seemed capable of residing was that neither crown should diminish the partition assigned to the other or put any obstacle in the way of the other attaining unto his portion. That clause was broken when James I conquered Caudete, Villena, and Sax, which technically belonged to Castile. At the same time, the infante Alfonso was holding Xàtiva in the zone assigned to Aragon.

The treaty first received mention in the second chapter of Llibre dels fets. The text of the treaty itself, however, was finally published in 1905. The treaty was signed in Campo de Mirra, where a monument, erected in 1977, still commemorates it. In 1296, during a break in the war between the two crowns, James II of Aragon conquered the Kingdom of Murcia. The kingdom was divided and Medio Vinalopó, Bajo Vinalopó, L'Alacantí, and Vega Baja del Segura were incorporated into Valencia by the treaties of Torrellas (1304) and Elche (1305).
