= Sax, Spain =

Sax
- Municipality
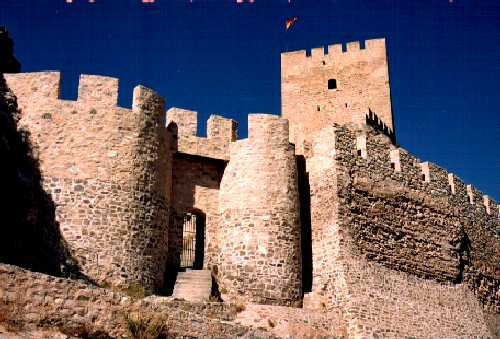
- Castle of Sax.

- Coat of arms

- Location in Spain Sax (Valencian Community) Sax (Spain)
- Coordinates: 38°32′22″N 0°48′58″W
- Country: Spain
- Autonomous community: Valencian Community
- Province: Alicante
- Comarca: Alt Vinalopó
- Judicial district: Villena

Government
  - Mayor: Laura Estevan Antolín (PP)

Area
  - Total: 63.5 km^{2} (24.5 sq mi)
- Elevation: 472 m (1,549 ft)

Population (2025-01-01)
  - Total: 10,346
  - Density: 163/km^{2} (422/sq mi)
- Demonym: Sajeño
- Time zone: UTC+1 (CET)
  - Summer (DST): UTC+2 (CEST)
- Postal code: 03630
- Official language(s): Spanish
- Website: Official website

Sax (Spanish pronunciation: [ˈsaks], locally: [ˈsas]. Valencian: Saix [ˈsajʃ]) is a municipality in the comarca of Alt Vinalopó, province of Alicante, Valencian Community.

== Toponymy ==
The origin of the name Sax is uncertain, although it has been related to the Latin term saxum (rock), due to the pointed rocky mass on which its castle stands, and around which the town appeared. The term has also been related to the Segisa that Ptolemy located in Bastetania. It is possible that during the Roman period there was an establishment or inn in Sax next to the Via Augusta. The current pronunciation is /saks/ although traditionally it was /sax/, as confirmed by the gentilic name Sajeño.

== History ==
There are archaeological findings in the area dating to the Bronze Age, as well as an Iberian necropolis and remains of Roman villas.

In the later stages of the Reconquista, Sax was at the focus of tensions between Castile and Aragon, since James I of Aragon conquered it from the Moors though it should have been reserved to Castile under the treaties of Tudilén and Cazorla.

== Notable people ==
- Alberto Sols García (1917–1989), biochemist, born in Sax

== Main sights ==
- Castle, one of three main fortress in the comarca together with those clnerthera of Villena and Biar. The base of one of the towers is perhaps Roman, while the other is of Moorish origin (10th–12th century)
- Church of the Assumption (16th century)
- Casa Fnek, a modern art museum located in an abandoned house

== See also ==
- Route of the Castles of Vinalopó
