= Fábricas Agrupadas de Muñecas de Onil Sociedad Anónima =

Spanish toy company

- Trade name: Famosa
- Type: privately-owned S.A.
- Industry: Toys, Entertainment
- Founded: 1957
Headquarters
Las Atalayas Industrial Polygon, Alicante, Spain
- Products: Nenuco, Barriguitas, Nancy, Jaggets, Pinypon, Nenuco Baby (baby toys) and Feber
- Owner: Giochi Preziosi
- Website: http://www.famosa.es

Fábricas Agrupadas de Muñecas de Onil Sociedad Anónima, better known for its initials FAMOSA, is a Spanish toy company historically based in Onil (Province of Alicante, Valencian Community). Between 2010 and 2019, it was owned by Sun Capital, an American risk capital fund. Since 2019 it is owned by Italian toy giant Giochi Preziosi. Its headquarters are located at the Las Atalayas industrial polygon in Alicante.

== Background ==
The Alicantine location of Onil, since the late nineteenth century, has traditionally been a doll manufacturing location. Since Ramón Mira Vidal decided to manufacture clay dolls, inspired by the idea of the English, the French and the Germans, many small companies and work studios started dedicating themselves to the art.

In the mid-twentieth century, the appearance of plastic, a much more malleable, cheaper and easy to work material than those employed by traditional components, caused an important development in the local doll workshops. Up until then, the dolls, which were made with clay, were teleported by donkey through several paths with irregular surface, which caused most of them to arrive broken or in a bad state. However, the introduction of plastic in the industry also caused the companies in Onil to face a difficult situation. The limited benefits they obtained made it impossible to receive the new machinery to renew themselves, putting their future at serious risk. On the other hand, the dolls that were manufactured there were known for their hard work, which increased its price and made them hard to sell. Also, the buyer started considering them to be out of date. For that, the workshops of Onil started working together under a single company, with the goal of facing the competition through the acquisition of new machinery. This way, they decided to persist in a changing and highly competitive market, avoiding the disappearance of a wide number of local companies.

== History ==
On February 23, 1957, a total of 25 companies in Onil merged, creating Famosa (Fábricas Agrupadas de Muñecas de Onil, S.A.) with its first director-general being Isidro Rico, replaced in 1978 by Jaime Ferri. The market accepted the idea well and gave the impression that all companies were satisfied with the new scenario. The first inconvenient Famosa faced came from within the group itself, as the abandoning of four companies that took part in the new company caused many of them to leave it. The fact that it was a group consisting of companies from the same location, and even with family ties between them, caused this "exodus". After that, Famosa continued with five of the founding companies, which decided to continue the project. In just ten years, Rico managed to put the coompany's finances on track.

Another problem Famosa faced in its early years was the launch of the "Baby Godín" doll in 1963. When everything was ready and with the requests on the point of being served, they noticed that, while at the warehouses, the skin color of the toys has inexplicably turned yellow, which made its launch impossible. The low quality of the plastic used was the possible cause of such an inconvenience. Bad quality plastic, but the one that was affordable by the government of the time, as importing such raw materials was heavily restricted. The hard work of the local population surpassed these difficulties and with the opening to new markets, Famosa decided to enter international toy fairs like in Lyon. The then-director-general of the company Isidro Rico and Ramón Sempere went there. Negotiations there were a failure and they returned to Onil empty-handed. A second attempt at the Núremberg Toy Fair was suggested but its directorate did not give them a proper slot and had to relocate to the landing part of a staircase, wheir their dolls were sold.

Some time later, negotiations were held with Geobra Brandstätter who was launching the Playmobil toy line, unknown at the time, presented to Spain by Jaime Ferri who later became one of its director-generals. Its launch was a success; bilateral contacts between both companies began in 1973, beginning to manufacture its clicks in Onil in 1976. The disappearance of Famobil (Famosa and Playmobil) is unknown, reportedly happening between 1982 and 1983, in which the existing Famobil line diluted over time, being replaced by Playmobil Ibérica, S.A., causing it to later abandon the license, and created a new product line focused on licensed characters and sets from animated movies.

In 1988, Famosa created a subsidiary, Famosa International Ltd., based in China, which manufactured parts of the dolls there and distributed the containers; the parent company was responsible for its directive.

As of 2002, around twenty of the founding families had shares in the company. That year, it was acquired by an investment group led by Inveralia y Torreal.

In 2003, Promociones Famosa merged all of its factories (Note: These companies were FÁBRICAS AGRUPADAS DE MUÑECAS DE ONIL, S. A. FAMOSA COMERCIAL, S. A. Sociedad unipersonal MANUFACTURAS QUIRÓN, S. A. FABRIPEL, S. A. Sociedad unipersonal FAMOPLAY MOTORS, S. A. ONILCO INNOVACIÓN, S. A. INDUSTRIA COMPLEMENTARIA DE LA MUÑECA, S. A. and AGRÍCOLA CASA ALARCÓN, S. A. Sociedad unipersonal.) and sold it to three companies: Caja de Ahorros del Mediterráneo, Inveralia y Torreal, Ahorro Corporación.

Later, in 2005, Famosa is acquired by Banco Santander's risk capital fund, Vista Capital, to the investment group owned by Inveralia y Torreal for €80 million in capital and €75 million in debt. After the sale, the production capacities in Onil were reduced by 70%, by outsourcing to China, causing hundreds of people to lose their jobs.

In 2006, Famosa acquired Feber, located in neighboring Ibi, having previously acquired Play by Play, dedicated to plushes. With this operation, it became the leading Spanish toy company in the outdoor and vehicle sectors, reinforcing its position in the sector. In 2008, Famosa acquired the rights to manufacture and release two figures of Rodolfo Chikilicuatre, who appeared in that year's Eurovision Song Contest.

In 2008 and 2009, Famosa suffered grave economic losses. In 2010, the company's sale to Sun Capital finished. In 2012, the company moved to the Las Atalayas industrial polygon, which implied daily 40km travels between the houses of the staff in Onil and the new factory in Alicante. What remains in Onil is the old factory, partly damaged and sold to other companies.

In 2019, Italian company Giochi Preziosi acquired Famosa, precisely at a time when it had better financial results, having an EBITDA worth €170 million. por lo que la marca italiana desapareció en el mercado español para priorizar la histórica.

In 2022, Famosa's brand Nenuco returned to Chile, after signing a distribution agreement with local toy company Ansaldo.

== Christmas jingle ==
The company is also known for its Christmas jingle, composed in the early 1970s by Luis Figuerola-Ferreti. It was created because of indecision regarding which toy it would advertise for the Christmas season, which led to the creation of a commercial, made by Clarín, featuring all of the toys available. Each of the toys represented the nativity scene common at Christmas, while the first commercial was a scenic version of it.

A tongue-in-cheek social media post in Christmas 2018 theorized that, based on the opening line of the jingle, the dolls would take 877 hours to travel from Onil to Bethlehem.
