= Barxell Castle =

- Castell de Barxell (Valencian)
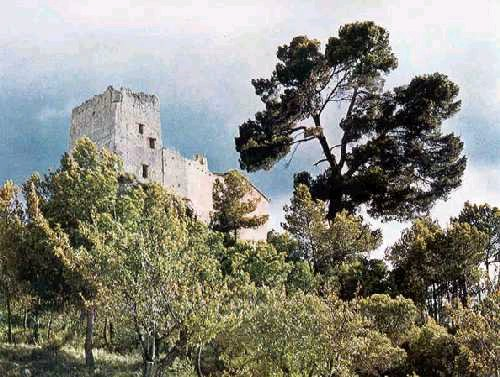

- Location within Spain
- 38.690808°N 0.530128°W
- Location: Alcoy, Valencian Community

Spanish Cultural Heritage
- Official name: Castell de Barxell
- Type: Non-movable
- Criteria: Monument
- Designated: 1996
- Reference no.: 03.27.009-004

The Barxell Castle, located in the municipality of Alcoy, Alicante, Spain, is a 13th-century medieval building which stands on a rocky mound in the middle of a pine forest. It is next to the CV-795 road, between Alcoy and Banyeres de Mariola. It is located in the rural place of Barxell at 800 metres altitude. It is very close to the "Solanetes" which had a small population in the Muslim era.

The Barxell Castle is located in the rural place of Barxell, in the Valley of Polop, a natural enclave of great scenic value between two natural parks, the Font Roja and Serra Mariola.

== Bibliography ==
- Jaén i Urban, Gaspar (1999). Instituto de Cultura Juan Gil-Albert, Colegio Territorial de Arquitectos de Alicante (ed.). Guía de arquitectura de la provincia de Alicante (in Spanish). p. 6. ISBN 84-7784-353-8.
- PAREDES VAÑÓ, Enric (2006), "El castell de Barxell" en Història d'Alcoi, Alcoi: Ajuntament d'Alcoi, Editorial Marfil, S.A., Centre Alcoià d'estudis Històrics i Arqueològics (p. 133) ISBN 84-89136-50-5
- PAREDES VAÑÓ, Enric (2011), "Aproximación a la arquitectura de las fortificaciones en las montañas del valle central del Serpis. Las Torres". Actas del Séptimo Congreso Nacional de Historia de la Construcción. Instituto Juan de Herrera - Madrid - 2011. ISBN 978-84-9728-370-0 | 2 vols., 146 comunicaciones, 1507 pp.

== See also ==
- Font Roja Natural Park
- Serra Mariola Natural Park
- Route of the Castles of Vinalopó
- Castle of Banyeres
- Cocentaina Castle
