= Castle of Biar =

Castle in Valencian Community, Spain

Coordinates: 38°37′55″N 0°45′50″W

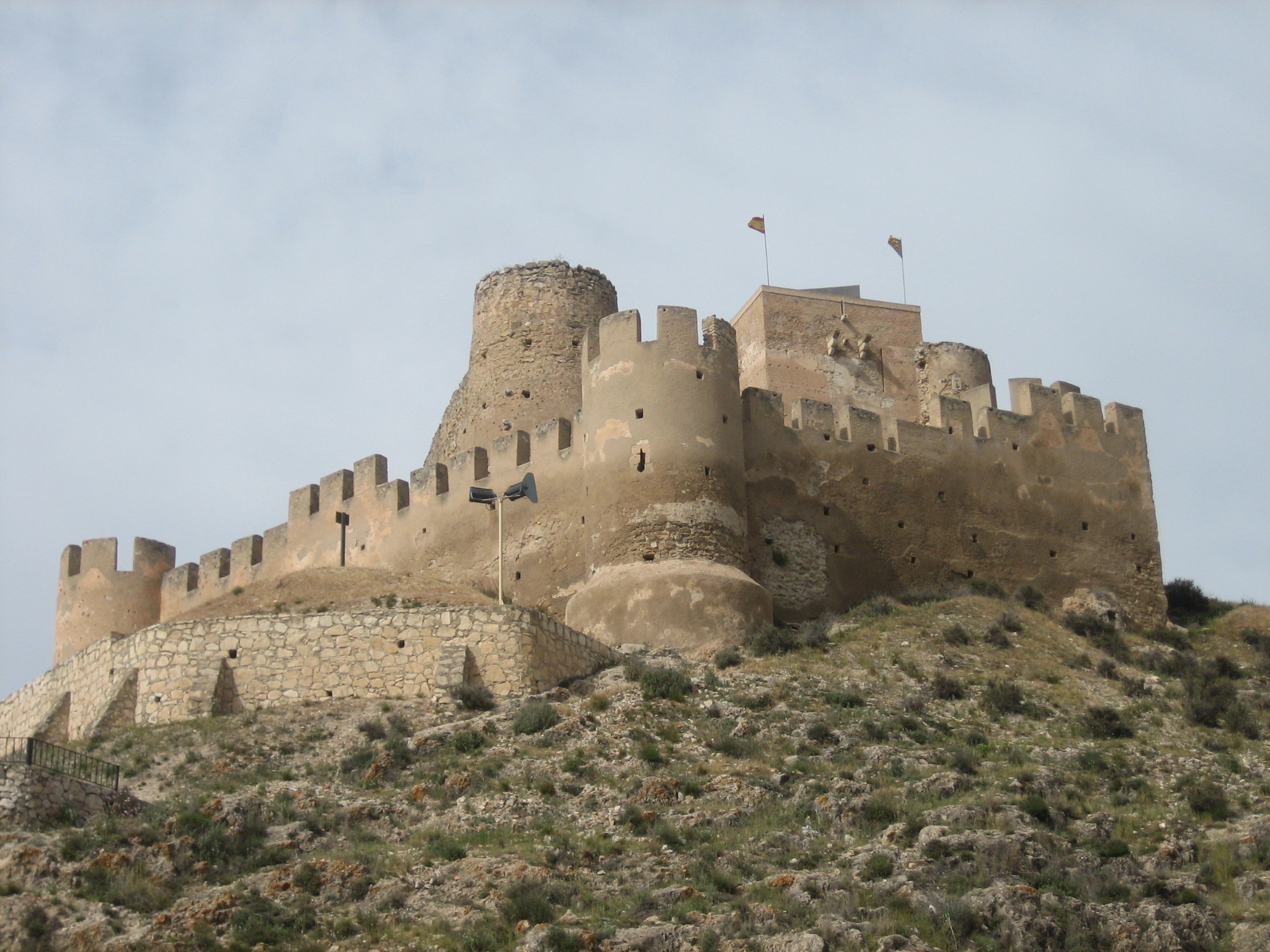
Castle of Biar

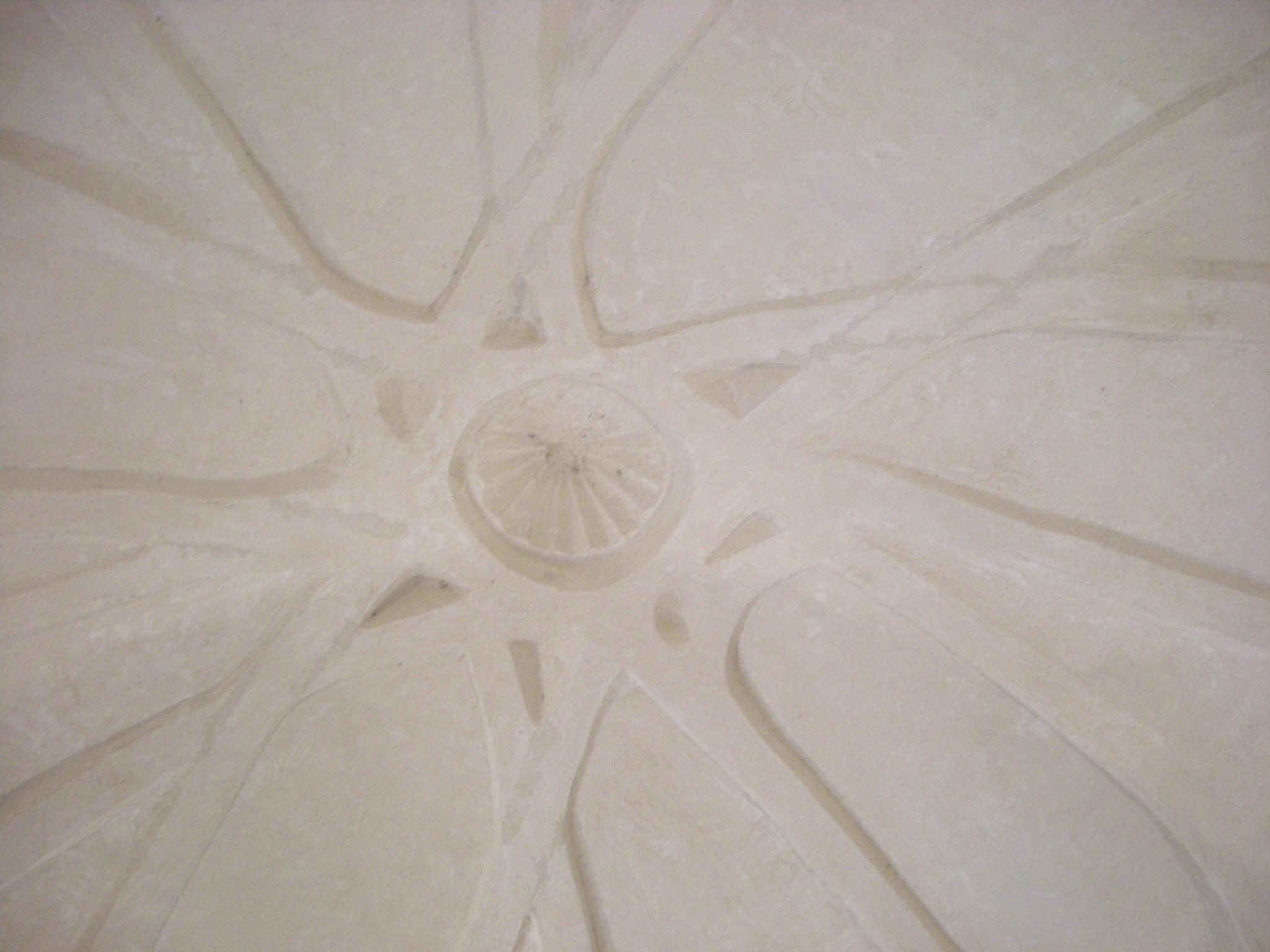
Almohad dome, one of the oldest in the Western Arab

The Castle of Biar stands on a hillock overlooking the town of Biar, in the comarca of Alt Vinalopó (Valencian Community, Spain).

== History ==
During the Muslim rule had already news but few of the fortress, which began to be relevant to the time of James I of Aragon, remain as border castle under the Treaty of Almizra. The building lost its role during the early modern period and, although rarely used, after was used as a cemetery. It was declared a Monumento Nacional in 1931 and is in the call Route of the Castles of Vinalopó.

== Structure ==
The castle was built in stone with masonry and rammed earth, which was used for the tower of homage. The building consists of two parts. On the one hand, a semicircular enclosure with four towers at the corners thereof, and on the other, a space with four cubic structures and the tower of homage. These towers and other structures are the basic defenses of the castle, and its position high on a rocky hill, the proliferation of small openings in its walls and battlements auction.

The tower of homage is the highlight of the architectural complex. Dating from the 12th century, the tower, situated on one side, was built with mortar mixture of sand and lime and reaches a height of 19 metres (62 ft). Its plan is square shaped and has three floors, acquiring such an enormous importance. On the lower floor is used the called barrel vault and the other levels, second and third, use the Almohad ribbed vault which, together with those of the neighboring Castle of Villena, are among the oldest in Spain and throughout the Maghreb, as well as the only used in a military building in the Iberian Peninsula.

== See also ==
- Route of the Castles of Vinalopó
