= Idrizaj =

Idrizaj is a surname. Notable people with the surname include:

- Besian Idrizaj (1987–2010), Austrian footballer
- Endrit Idrizaj (born 1989), Albanian footballer
- Hektor Idrizaj (born 1989), Albanian footballer
- Onils Idrizaj (born 1991), Albanian footballer
