= Cañada, Alicante =

Cañada
- Coat of arms

- Location within Spain
- Coordinates: 38°40′3″N 0°48′37″W
- Country: Spain
- Autonomous Community: Valencian Community
- Province: Alicante
- Comarca: Alto Vinalopó

Government
  - Mayor: Juan Molina Beneito (PP)

Area
  - Total: 19.32 km^{2} (7.46 sq mi)
- Elevation: 558 m (1,831 ft)

Population (2025-01-01)
  - Total: 1,213
  - Density: 62.78/km^{2} (162.6/sq mi)
- Time zone: UTC+1 (CET)
  - Summer (DST): UTC+2 (CEST)
- Postal code: 03409
- Website: Official website

Cañada (Spanish: [kaˈɲaða]) or La Canyada (Valencian: [la kaˈɲaða]) is a Spanish municipality in the comarca of Alt Vinalopó, province of Alicante, Valencian Community.
