= Benifallim =

- Municipality
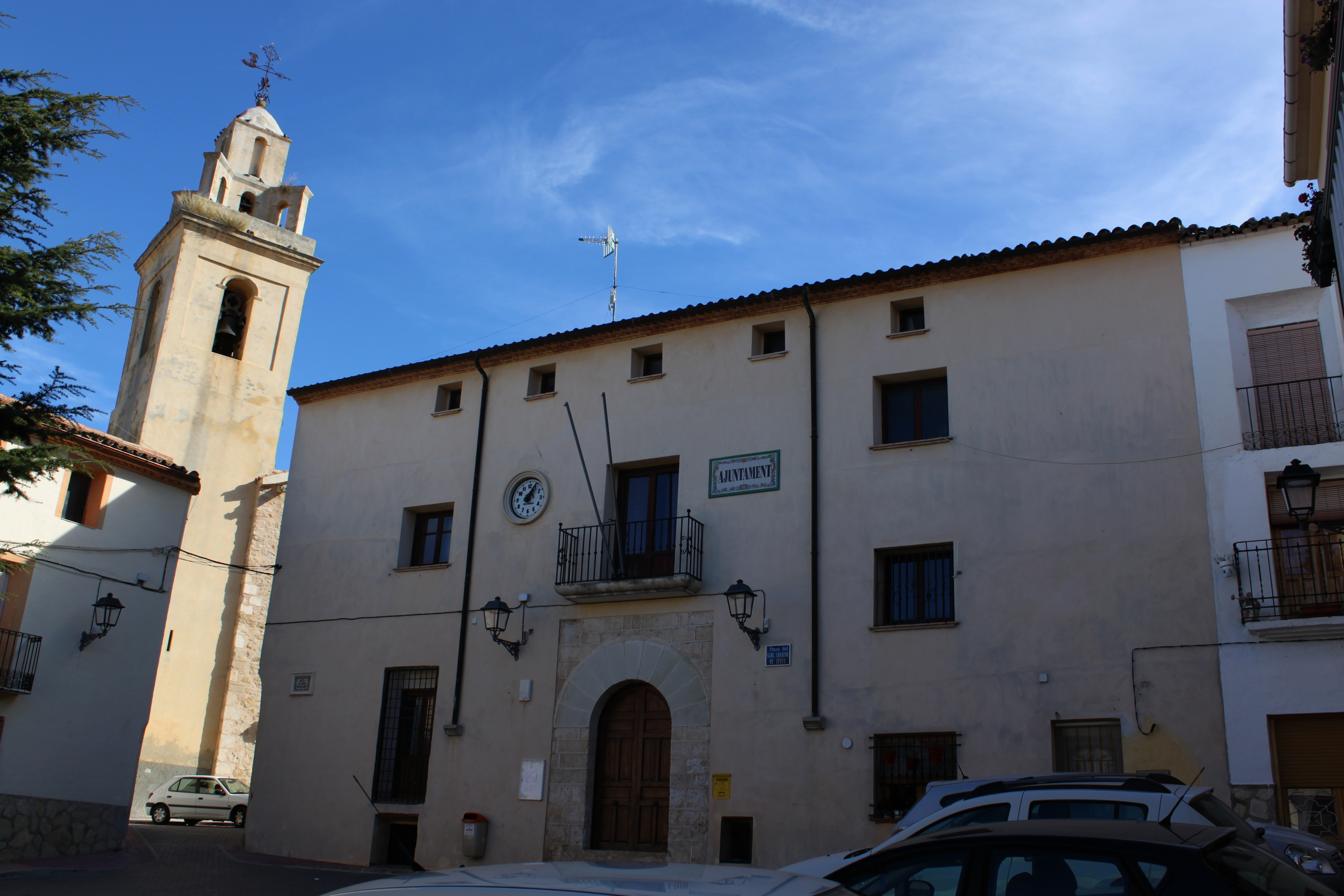
- Town hall

- Coat of arms

- Location in Spain
- Coordinates: 38°39′46″N 0°23′59″W
- Country: Spain
- Autonomous community: Valencian Community
- Province: Alicante
- Comarca: Alcoià
- Judicial district: Alcoi

Area
  - Total: 13.70 km^{2} (5.29 sq mi)
- Elevation: 734 m (2,408 ft)

Population (2025-01-01)
  - Total: 130
  - Density: 9.5/km^{2} (25/sq mi)
- Demonym(s): Benefallimer, benefallimera
- Time zone: UTC+1 (CET)
  - Summer (DST): UTC+2 (CEST)
- Postal code: 03816
- Official language(s): Valencian

Benifallim (Valencian: [benifaˈʎim]; Spanish: [benifaˈʎin]) is a municipality in the comarca of Alcoià in the Valencian Community, Spain.
