= Salinas, Alicante =

Salinas
- Municipality
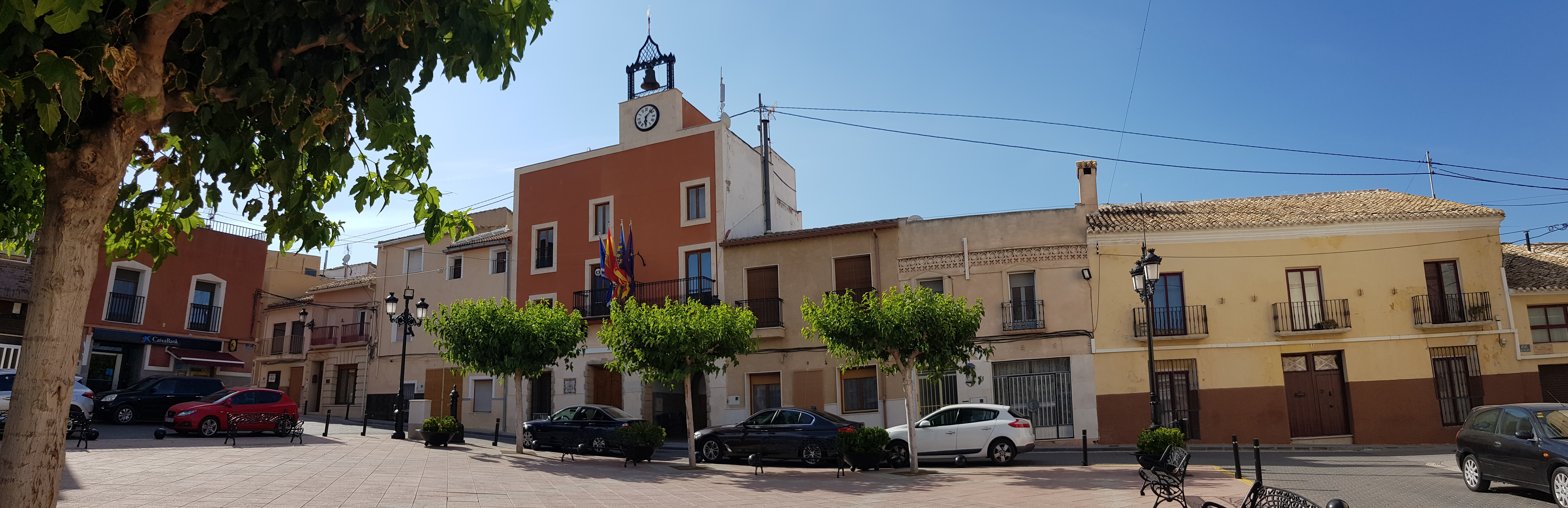

- Coat of arms

- Location within the Province of Alicante Location within Spain
- Coordinates: 38°31′16″N 0°54′42″W
- Country: Spain
- Autonomous community: Valencian Community
- Province: Alicante
- Comarca: Alt Vinalopó
- Judicial district: Villena
- Founded: c. 11th century
- Reestablished after major flooding: 1751 AD
- Seat: Ayuntamiento Nuevo de Salinas

Government
  - Type: Mayor-council government
  - Body: Ayuntamiento de Salinas
  - Mayor: Isidro Monzó Perez (2019) (PP)

Area
  - Total: 61.7 km^{2} (23.8 sq mi)
- Elevation: 493 m (1,617 ft)
- Highest elevation: 1,238 m (4,062 ft)

Population (2025-01-01)
  - Total: 1,828
  - Density: 29.6/km^{2} (76.7/sq mi)
- Demonym: salinero/a (es)
- Time zone: UTC+1 (CET)
  - Summer (DST): UTC+2 (CEST)
- Postal code: 03638
- Area code: +34 (ES) +96 (Valencian Community)
- Official language(s): Spanish
- Website: www.salinas.es

Salinas (Spanish pronunciation: [saˈlinas]) is a Spanish municipality in the comarca of Alto Vinalopó, province of Alicante, Valencian Community.
