= Coat of arms of Sax =

The official coat of arms of Sax.

== History ==
This is the traditional coat of arms of the Spanish municipality of Sax, with a representation of the Castle of Sax, the canting arms of Juan Manuel, Prince of Villena, the First Lord of Sax, and a reference to the extensive pine forests that covered the region during the time period and were one of the municipality's main sources of wealth. The shield was approved by a resolution on November 20, 1998.
