= Onil (given name) =

Onil or Onils is a given name. Notable people with the name include:

- Onil Doiron, Canadian politician
- Onils Idrizaj (born 1991), Albanian footballer
