= Cocentaina Castle =

- Castell de Cocentaina (Valencian)
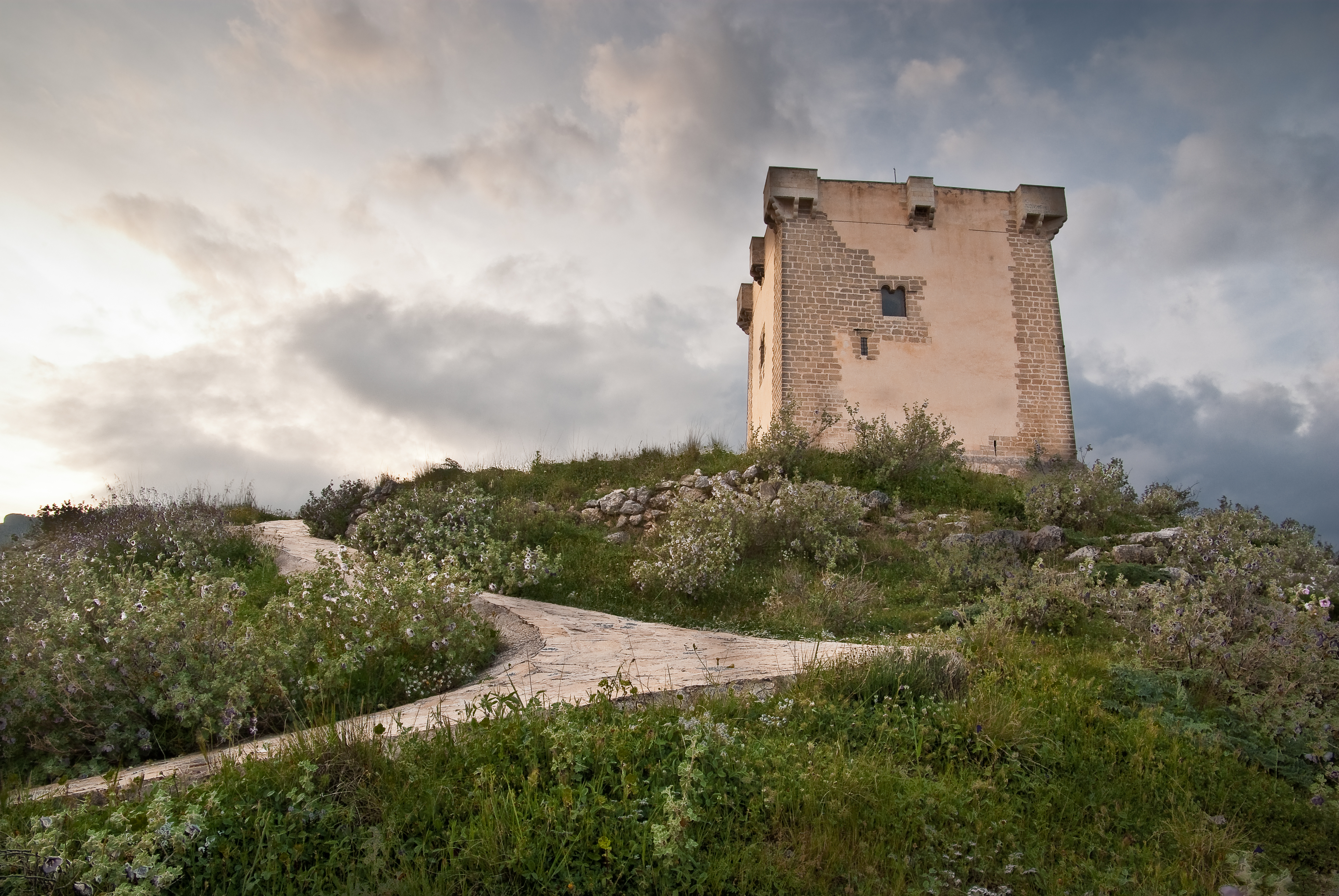

- Location within Spain
- 38.745969°N 0.447022°W
- Location: Cocentaina, Valencian Community

Site notes
- Architectural style: XIV

Spanish Cultural Heritage
- Official name: Castell de Cocentaina
- Type: Non-movable
- Criteria: Monument
- Designated: 1985

The Castle of Cocentaina, located in the municipality of Cocentaina, Alicante, Spain, is a 14th-century medieval building which stands on a rocky mound of 765 m. The castle structure, recently restored, is one of the town's symbols. The tower is a square two-story structure. On the first floor there is an open patio with a well, a chapel and a warehouse. On the upper floor, where the lords lived, there is a cornice with battlements and a path for guards. The castle is a good example of military gothic style.

== See also ==
- Route of the Valencian classics
- Castle of Barxell
- Route of the Castles of Vinalopó
- Castle of Banyeres

== Bibliography ==
- Guía de Arquitectura de la Provincia de Alicante. ISBN 84-7784-353-8
- PAREDES VAÑÓ, Enric (2011), "Aproximación a la arquitectura de las fortificaciones en las montañas del valle central del Serpis. Las Torres". Actas del Séptimo Congreso Nacional de Historia de la Construcción. Instituto Juan de Herrera - Madrid - 2011. ISBN 978-84-9728-370-0 | 2 vols., 146 comunicaciones, 1507 pp.
