= Alberto Sols =

Spanish researcher in biochemistry (1917–1989)

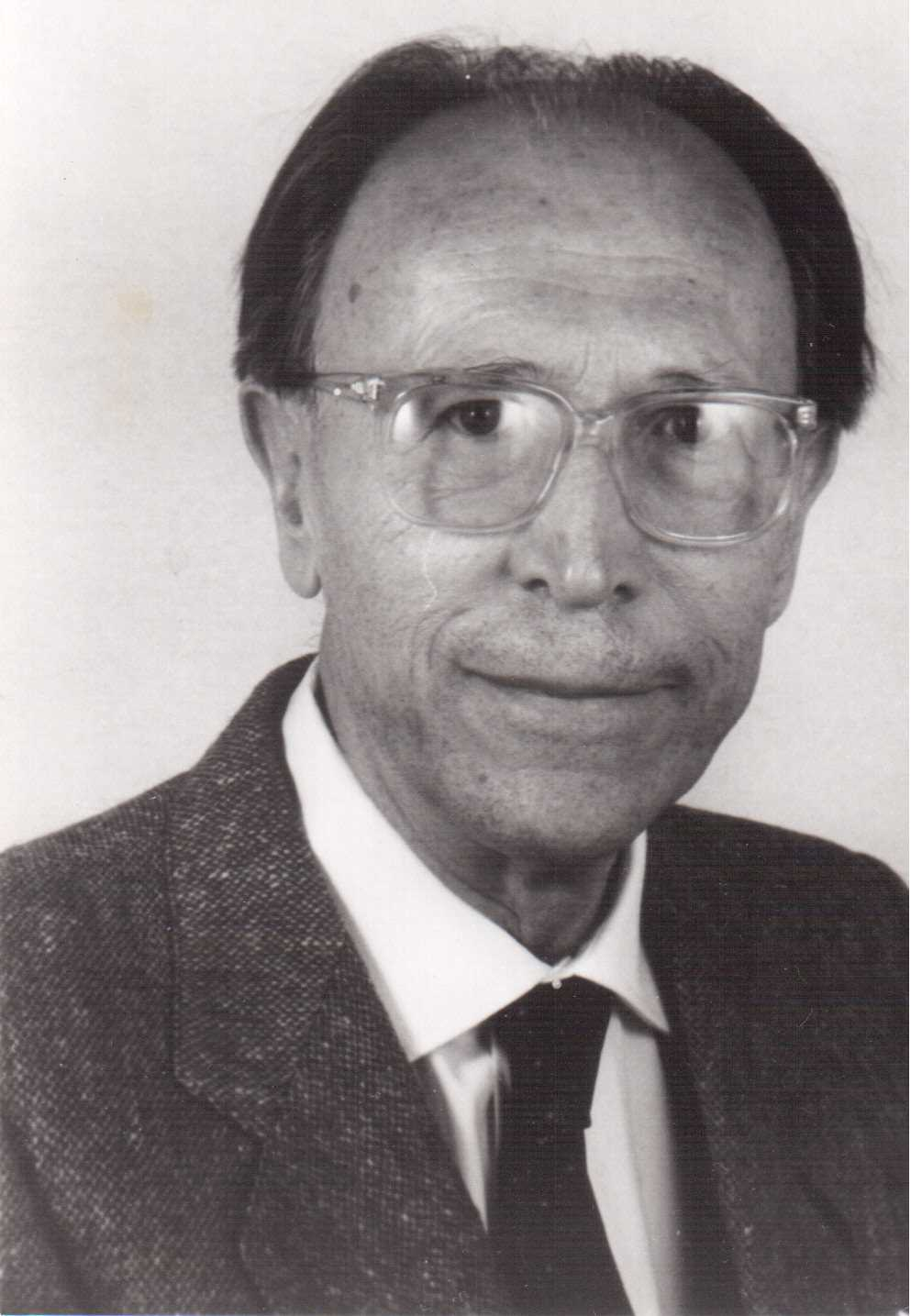
- Sols in 1987
- Born: Alberto Sols García; 2 February 1917; Sax (Alicante), Spain
- Died: 10 August 1989 (aged 72); Dénia (Alicante), Spain
- Education: University of Valencia
- Known for: Investigation of hexokinases; carbohydrate metabolism
- Awards: Plaque of the Civil Order of Alfonso X, the Wise; Grand Cross of the Civil Order of Alfonso X, the Wise; Prince of Asturias Award for Technical and Scientific Research
- Scientific career
- Fields: Biochemistry
- Workplaces: Washington University School of Medicine; Spanish National Research Council

Alberto Sols García (1917–1989) was a Spanish researcher specializing in biochemistry, working especially on hexokinases. He effectively created biochemistry as a major discipline in Spain.

== Life ==
Alberto Sols was born in Sax, Alicante, on 2 February 1917, the son of Pedro Sols Lluch. He died in Denia, Alicante, on 10 August 1989. The house of his birth is now the Centro de Estudios y Archivo Histórico Municipal Alberto Sols.

== Career ==
Sols studied medicine at the University of Valencia. After working for three years, principally with Robert Crane at Washington University in St. Louis, in the group of Nobel prizewinners Carl and Gerty Cori he returned to Spain in 1954, and created a research group at the Spanish National Research Council (CSIC). His work concerned hexokinases and sugar phosphorylation in general.

In 1963 he was Founding President of the Spanish Society of Biochemistry (now Spanish Society of Biochemistry and Molecular Biology—Sociedad Española de Bioquímica y Biología Molecular: SEBBM). He was also a member of scientific societies in the UK, USA, Argentina and Chile.

== Distinctions ==
Sols received numerous prizes, and was the first holder of the Prince of Asturias Award for Technical and Scientific Research in 1981. In 1987 he received the National Research Prize "Santiago Ramón y Cajal" of the Ministry of Education. In 1989 he was elected to the Royal National Academy of Medicine of Spain.
