= Font Roja Natural Park =

- Parc Natural del Carrascar de la Font Roja (Valencian); Parque Natural del Carrascal de la Fuente Roja (Spanish)
- IUCN category II (national park)
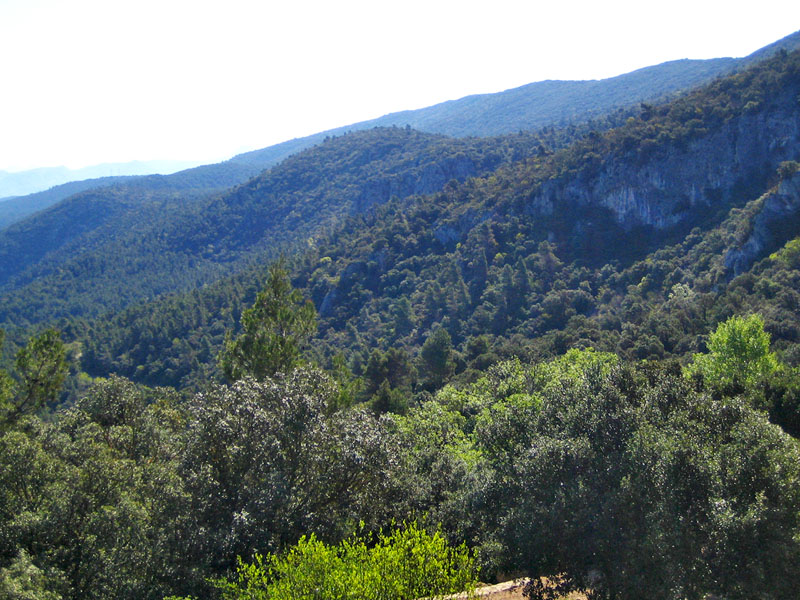
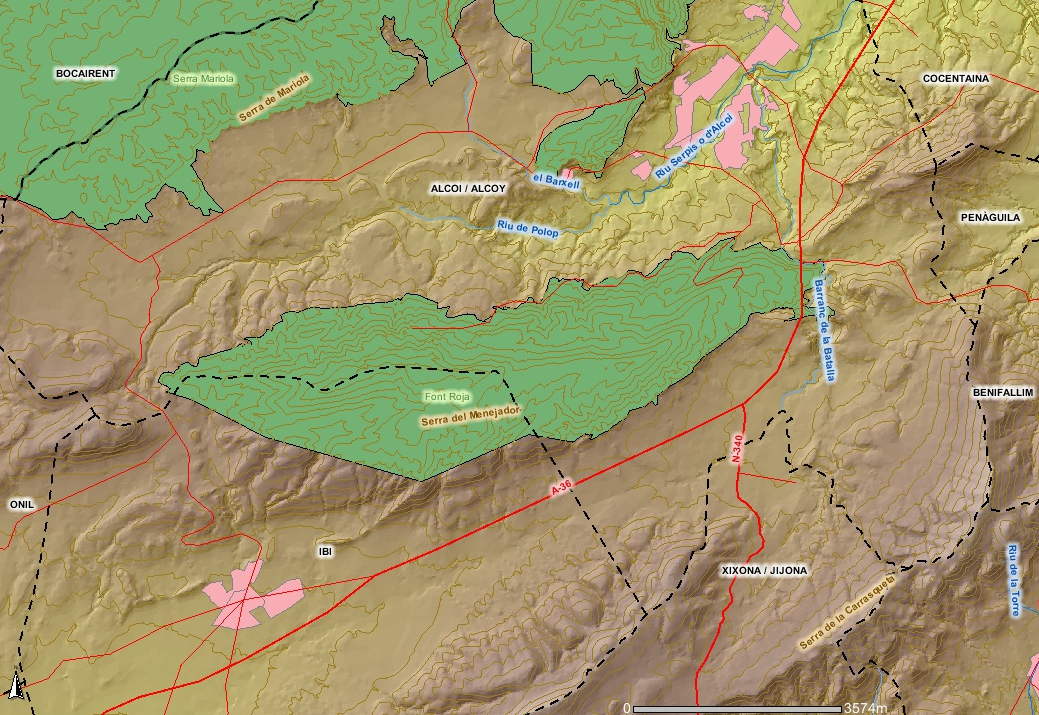
- View of the park Map of the Font Roja Natural Park
- Interactive map of Font Roja Natural Park
- Location: Alcoy, Valencian Community, Spain
- Nearest city: Valencian Community: Alcoy, Ibi
- Coordinates: 38°38′51″N 0°32′46″W
- Area: 2.450 ha (6.05 acres)
- Established: 1987
- Governing body: Generalitat Valenciana

The Font Roja Natural Park (Valencian: Parc Natural del Carrascar de la Font Roja, Spanish: Parque Natural del Carrascal de la Fuente Roja) is a natural park situated in Alcoy, in the autonomous community of Valencia, in eastern Spain.

The Font Roja natural park was declared on April 13, 1987 natural park by the Generalitat Valenciana. It is located in the comarca of Alcoià, in the North of the province of Alicante, between the towns of Alcoy and Ibi. This natural park is one of the best preserved natural areas of the Valencian Community. The protected natural area covers 2.298 hectares and comprises mountainous alignment of L'Alt de Sant Antoni (El Alto de San Antonio), El Carrascar of the Font Roja (El Carrascar de la Font Roja) and La Teixereta. The summit of the Serra del Menejador, with 1,356 m of height, is the highest elevation of the park.

== See also ==
- Serra Mariola Natural Park
- Barxell Castle
