= Treaty of Cazola =

1179 treaty between Aragon and Castile

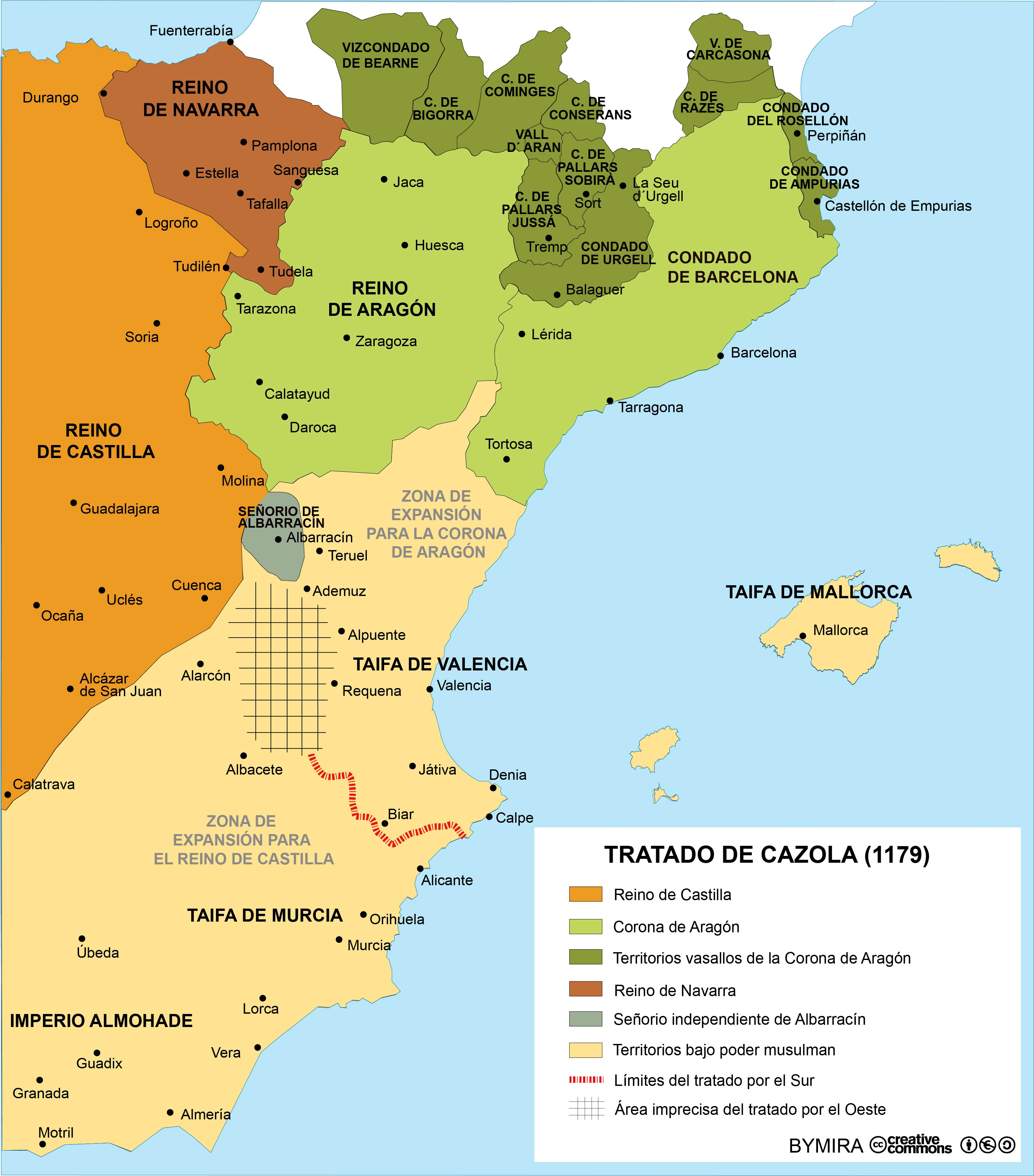
Map of the Treaty of Cazola (spanish)

The Treaty of Cazola (or Cazorla) was signed in 1179 in Soria between Alfonso II of Aragon and Alfonso VIII of Castile. The pact divided Al-Andalus into separate zones of conquest for the two kingdoms, so that the work of the Reconquista would not be stymied by internecine feuding over spoils among the Christians. Aragon was given the places of Xàtiva, Denia, and Biar, from Biar to Calpe towards Valencia. Castile had all the lands on the other side of Biar. Compared with the earlier Treaty of Tudilén, Aragon had lost the right of annexing Murcia. The agreement further stipulated that it was to be held in perpetuity and upheld by the successors of both Alfonsos. This was reinforced with a clause stating that neither king could give up his part or diminish the part of the other, nor could any obstacle be put in the way by either king of the conquest by his counterpart of his rightful division. The subsequent breach of the treaty by both parties led to the Treaty of Almizra in 1244.
