= Onil =

Town in Spain

Coordinates: 38°38′N 0°40′W

For people with the given name, see Onil (given name).

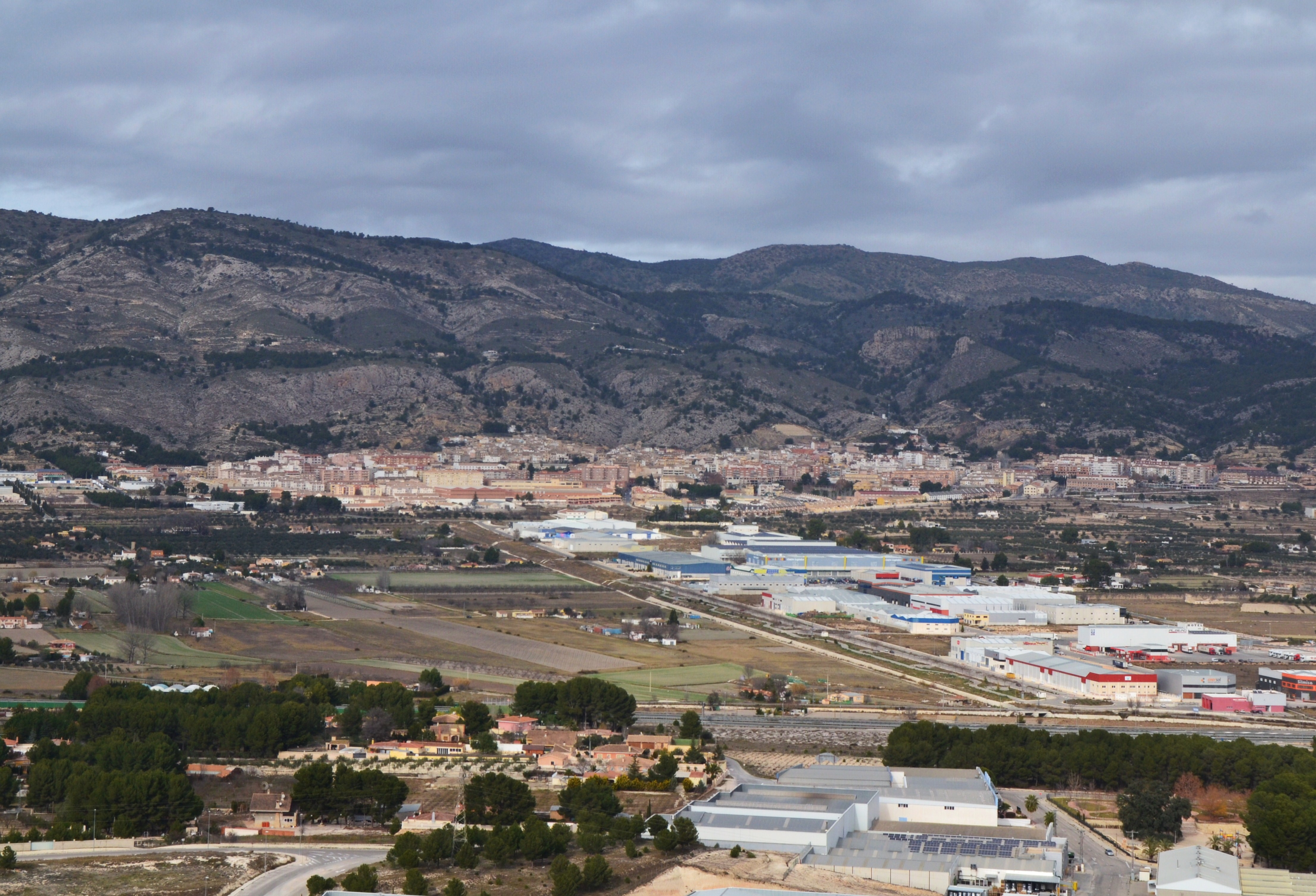
Onil

Onil's flag

Onil's coat of arms

Onil (Valencian: [oˈnil]; Spanish: [oˈnil]) is a town and municipality located in the comarca of L'Alcoià, in the province of Alicante, Valencian Community, Spain. It has an area of 48.41 km^{2} and, according to the 2021 census, a total population of 7,612 inhabitants and a population density of 154.22 inhabitants/km^{2}. Onil is located next to the mountain called Serra d'Onil in the Serra de Mariola, 36 km from Alicante city.

The economy of Onil is based on the industries of toy, construction and farming (almonds and olives).

The most important monuments in Onil are the Palace–Fortress from the 16th century, which is the headquarters of the town council; the Catholic church of Saint James Apostles (from the 17th-18th century) and the Hermitages of Saint Bonaventure (from the 17th century) and Saint Anna.

The Moros i Cristians festival of Onil is celebrated each April.
