= Penàguila =

Penàguila Penáguila
- Municipality
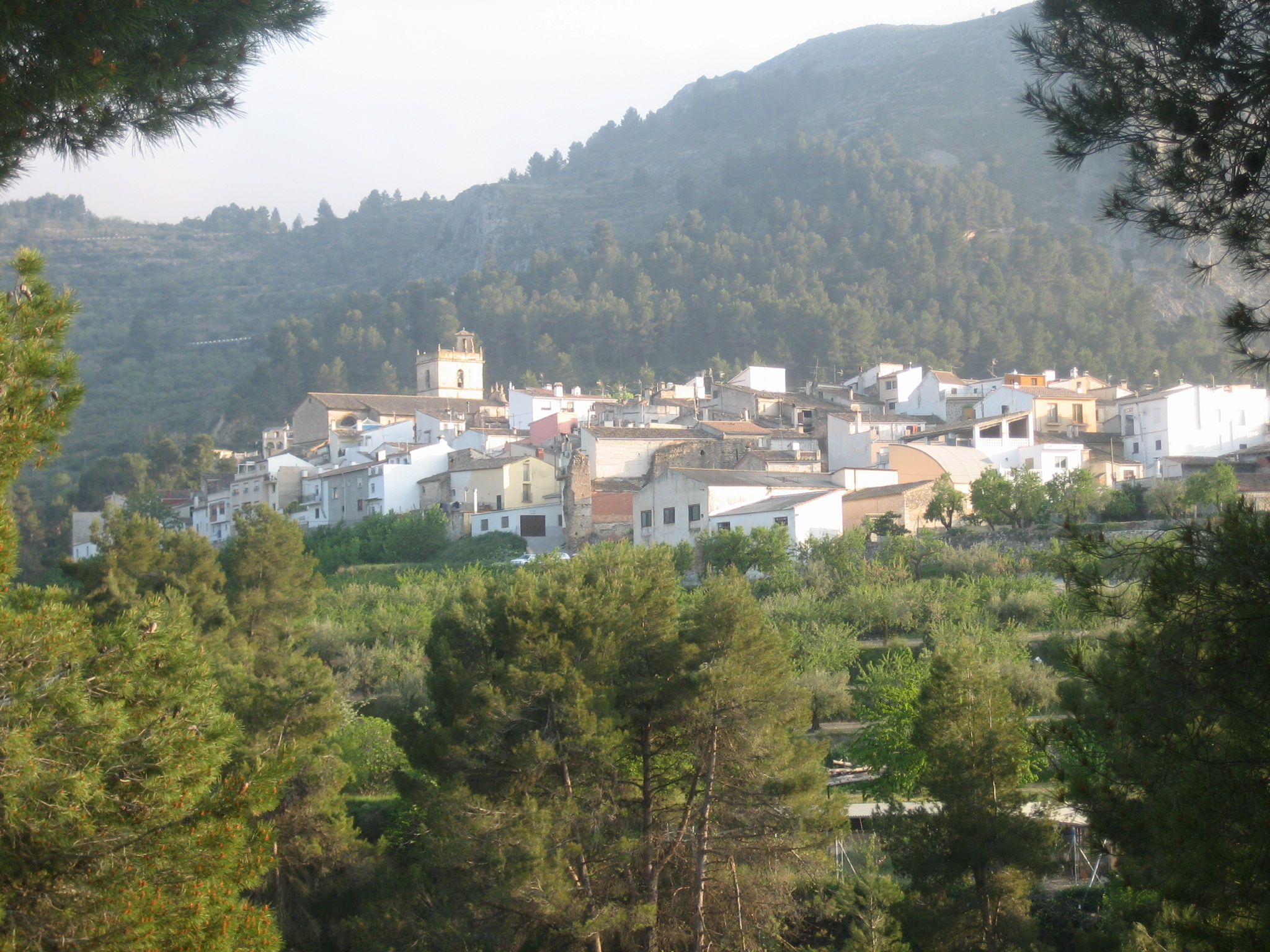
- General view of Penàguila

- Coat of arms

- Location of Penàguila in Spain
- Coordinates: 38°40′45″N 0°21′33″W
- Country: Spain
- Autonomous Community: Valencian Community
- Province: Alicante
- Comarca: Alcoià
- Founded: 324 BC

Government
  - Mayor: Carlos Blanes Gisbert (PP)

Population (2025-01-01)
  - Total: 305
- Demonym(s): penaguilenc, -a (Val.) penaguilero, -a (Sp.)
- Time zone: UTC+1 (CET)
  - Summer (DST): UTC+2 (CEST)
- Postal code: 03815
- Area code: +34 (ES) + 96 (A)
- Official language(s): Valencian; Spanish
- Website: Official website

Penàguila (Valencian: [peˈnaɣila]; Spanish: Penáguila [peˈnaɣila]) is a municipality in the comarca of Alcoià, Alicante, Valencia, Spain.

== Geography ==
Located at the foot of the Sierra de Penàguila in Pre-Baetic Valencian domain, the municipality extends from Morro Ull (1050 m), west to the top of the Creueta, east, forming part of the northern slopes of the Sierra de Aitana and open to the pit of Alcoy. The term river running through Frainós or Penàguila, east of the town, which flows into the river Alcoy Serpis or when it reaches Cocentaina.

== History ==
Of Muslim origin, the villa was totally walled, and currently some ruins of the walls and towers remain.

On April 8, 1276, James I promised Lacerates Berenguer Mayor Penàguila Castle, divide the lands of the same men who guard it strength. On September 26, 1278, Peter III granted Penàguila a town charter. In 1338, Pedro of Aragon ordered the fortification of the castle. During the fifteenth and sixteenth centuries the manor belonged to the Fenollar family before it became part of the crown. Penàguila was a royal town with voting rights in the courts (Corts Valencianes).

In contrary to other places in the area, Penàguila consisted of a largely Christian population, so the decree of expulsion of the Moors, in 1609, was a not important to its demographics: the 200 homes registered before expulsion were reduced to 145, and did not involve an excessive loss.

Penàguila belonged until 1707 to the governor of Xàtiva, and until 1833, was part of the township of Alcoy. With the provincial division of 1833 it was included in the province of Alicante.

== Economy ==
A little more than half of the municipal area is cropland (54%), the other half is forest land (46%). The breeding ground is practically all of dry (2,480 ha), where the predominant olive (over 1,400 ha), there are also almond (365 ha) and minor surfaces fruit trees (peaches, plums, apples). Irrigation is minimal (41 ha) and is dedicated to horticultural crops and a variety of fruit. Agricultural activities are organized in cooperative farmers Virgen del Patrocinio.
