= Tibi, Spain =

Coordinates: 38°32′N 0°35′W

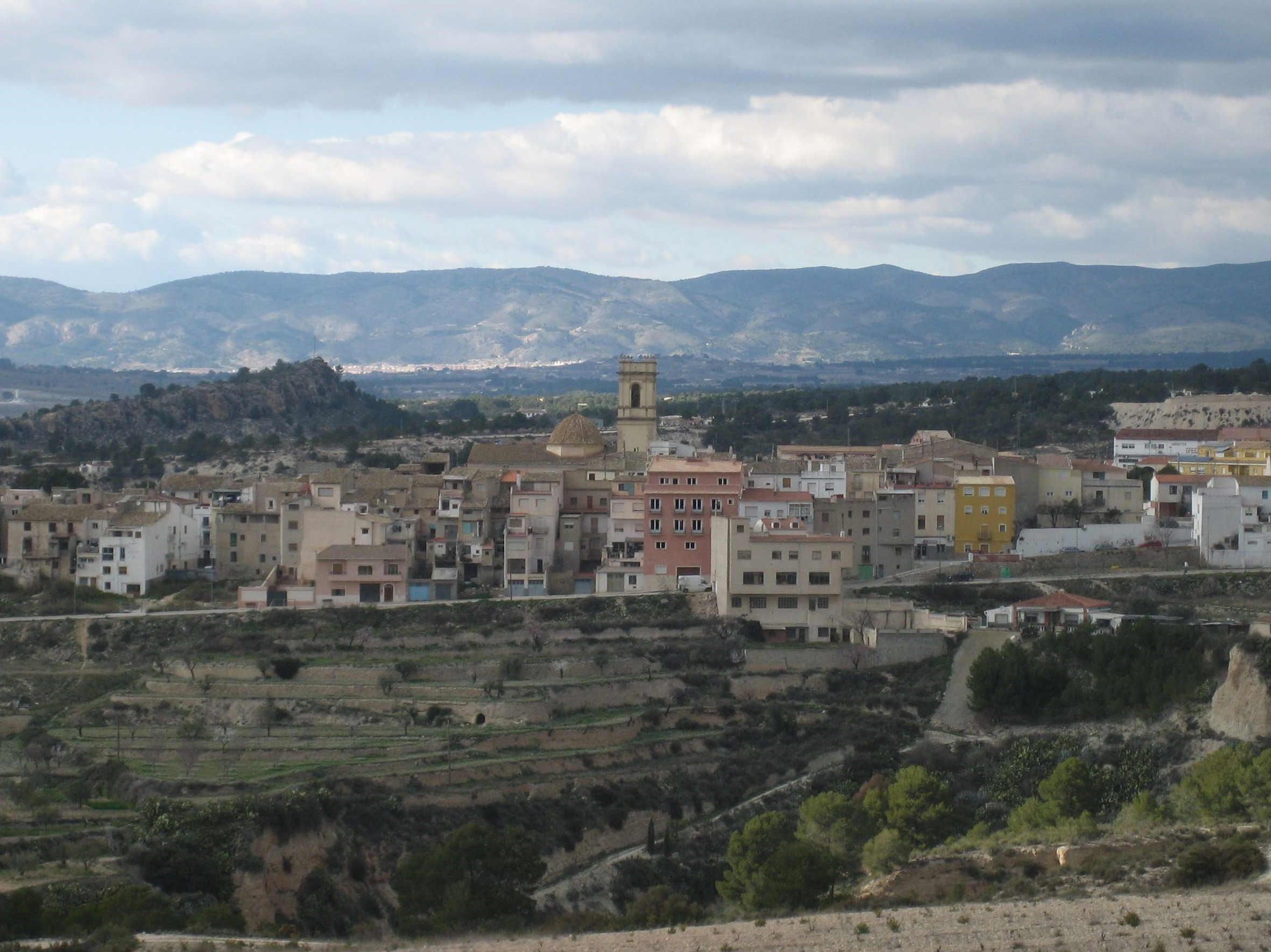

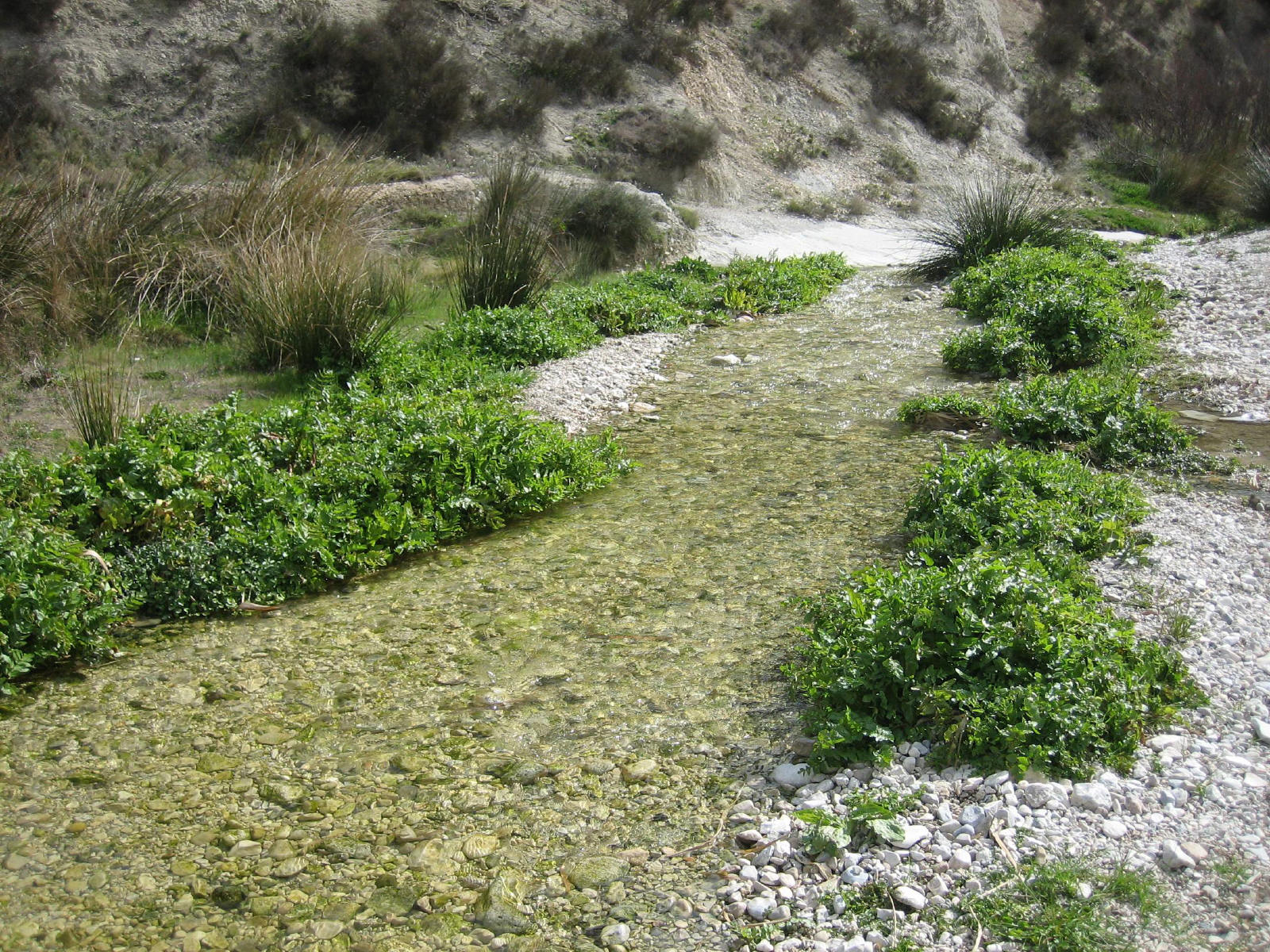
Monnegre river in Tibi.

Tibi's coat of arms

Tibi (Valencian: [ˈtibi]; Spanish: [ˈtiβi]) is a municipality in the comarca of Alcoià, Alicante, Valencia, Spain. The name of this municipality comes from Latin and it means "for you". This territory was populated with 1,564 people in the year 2018.

== Geography ==
Two mountain ranges stretches this municipality: Serra del Maigmó and Serra de la Penya-roja. The village is places on the slope of the second mountain range. A river whose name is Monnegre or Riu Verd traverses the municipality.

== History ==
During the period in which Muslims occupied the Iberian Peninsula, this current municipality was governed by several kings. The castle that is located in Tibi was built in that era. The village belong to the Almohad king Zayt-Abu-Zayt until the year 1240 and then it was conquered by James I of Aragon.

In the year 1244 the Treaty of Almizra, which was a result of a pact between the king Alfonso X of Castile and James I of Aragon, was signed. A line that had a border function was traced and it demarcated the Crown of Aragon and the Crown of Castile. The border started in Biar, crossed Tibi and Basot and ended on the coast line.

James I of Aragon bestowed the territory to Pedro Sánchez de Lienda and his spouse Ixonis de Soler. The population of the hamlet consisted of 150 inhabitants in that era.

The manor Villa de Tibi and its castle was governed by several lords until the mid 15th century. Then, it became property of the head of the Marquisate of Villena, which was lord of a territory that extended from the area of Jumilla (north of Region of Murcia) to Villena. In the early 18th century, the current municipality was owned by the head of Marquisate of Dos Aguas until its demise in 1717.

== Main sights ==
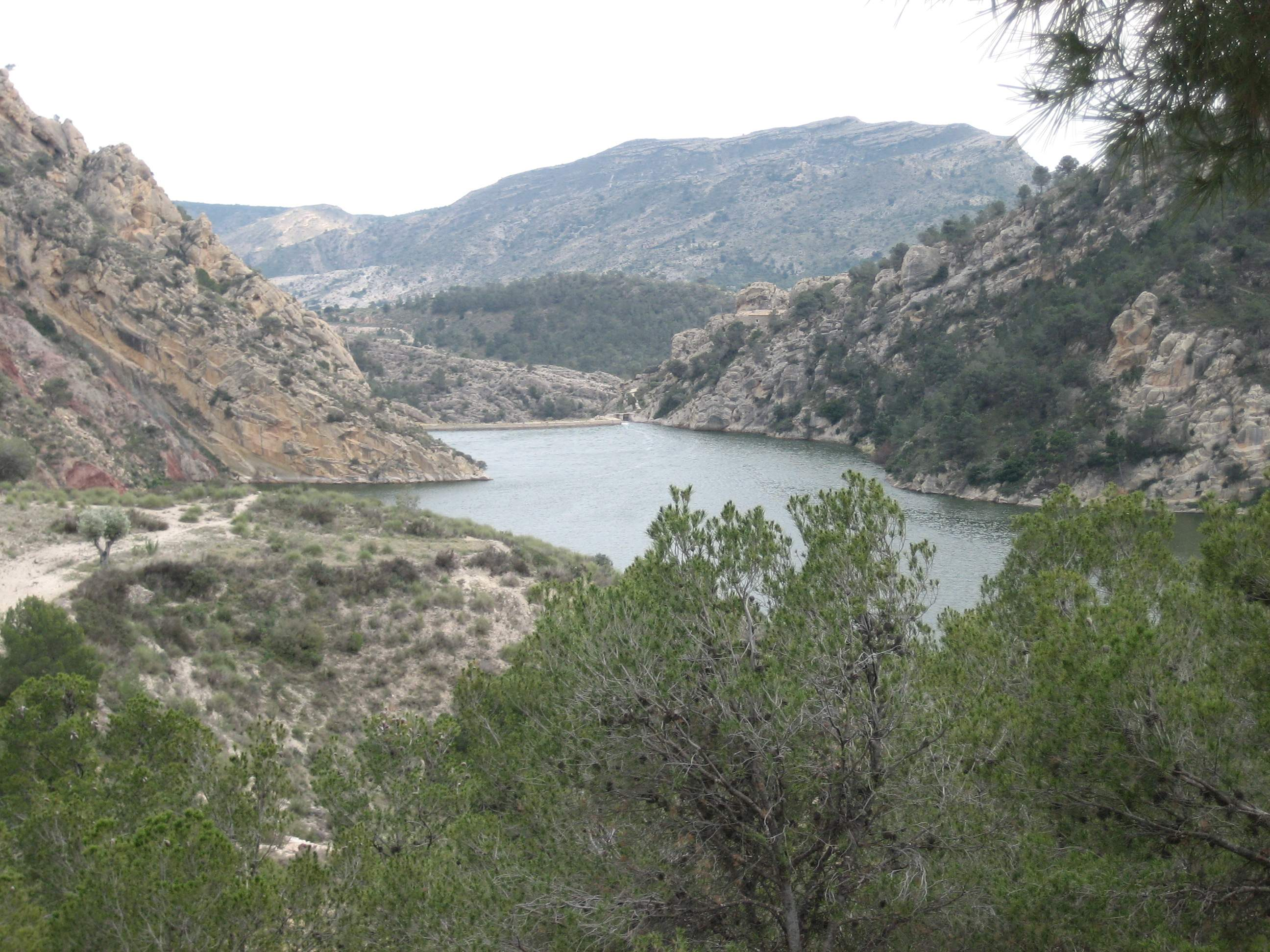
The reservoir of Tibi.

Castle in Tibi This castle is located on a long shaped peak. It was built in the 10th century and it belonged to the Almohad dynasty until the year 1240. After the Christian conquer, it became owned by the Crown of Aragon.

Reservoir in Tibi It is one of the most ancient work of water blocking and deliver in Europe. Its construction was ordered by the king Philip II of Spain in the 16th century for making possible the water supply in the historic region Horta d'Alacant. This work keeps functioning nowadays.
