= Beneixama =

Beneixama Benejama
- Municipality
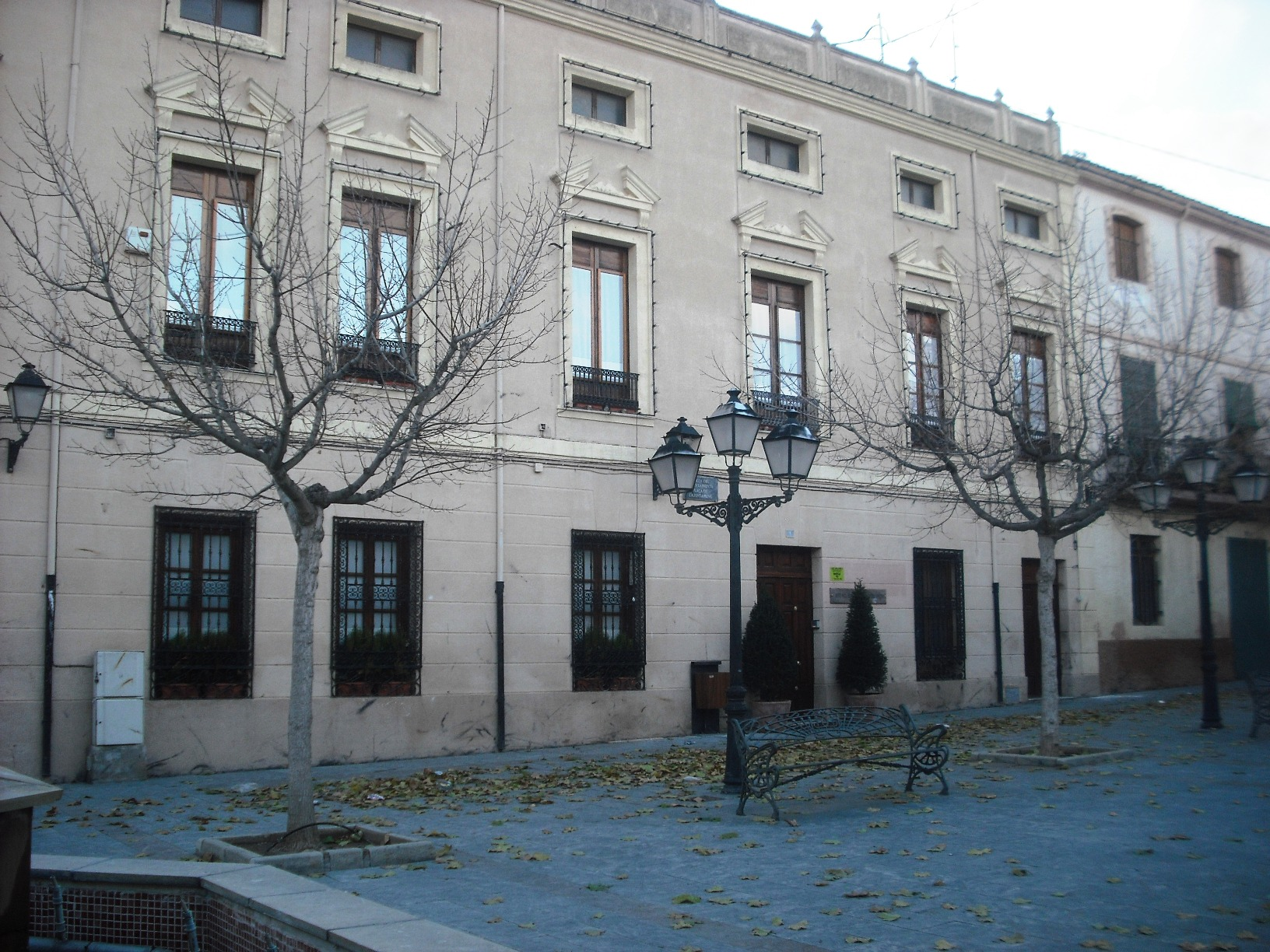
- Town hall

- Coat of arms

- Location in Spain
- Coordinates: 38°42′0″N 0°46′2″W
- Country: Spain
- Autonomous community: Valencian Community
- Province: Alacant / Alicante
- Comarca: Alt Vinalopó
- Judicial district: Villena

Government
  - Mayor: Amparo Barceló Segura (2007) (PSOE)

Area
  - Total: 34.89 km^{2} (13.47 sq mi)
- Elevation: 592 m (1,942 ft)

Population (2025-01-01)
  - Total: 1,696
  - Density: 48.61/km^{2} (125.9/sq mi)
- Demonym(s): • beneixamer, -a or beneixamut, -uda (Val.) • benejamense (Sp.)
- Time zone: UTC+1 (CET)
  - Summer (DST): UTC+2 (CEST)
- Postal code: 03460
- Official language(s): Valencian and Spanish
- Website: Official website

Beneixama (Valencian: [benejˈʃama], locally [beniˈʃama]; Spanish: Benejama [beneˈxama]) is a municipality in the comarca of Alt Vinalopó in the north of Alicante province, Valencian Community, Spain.

== Gallery ==
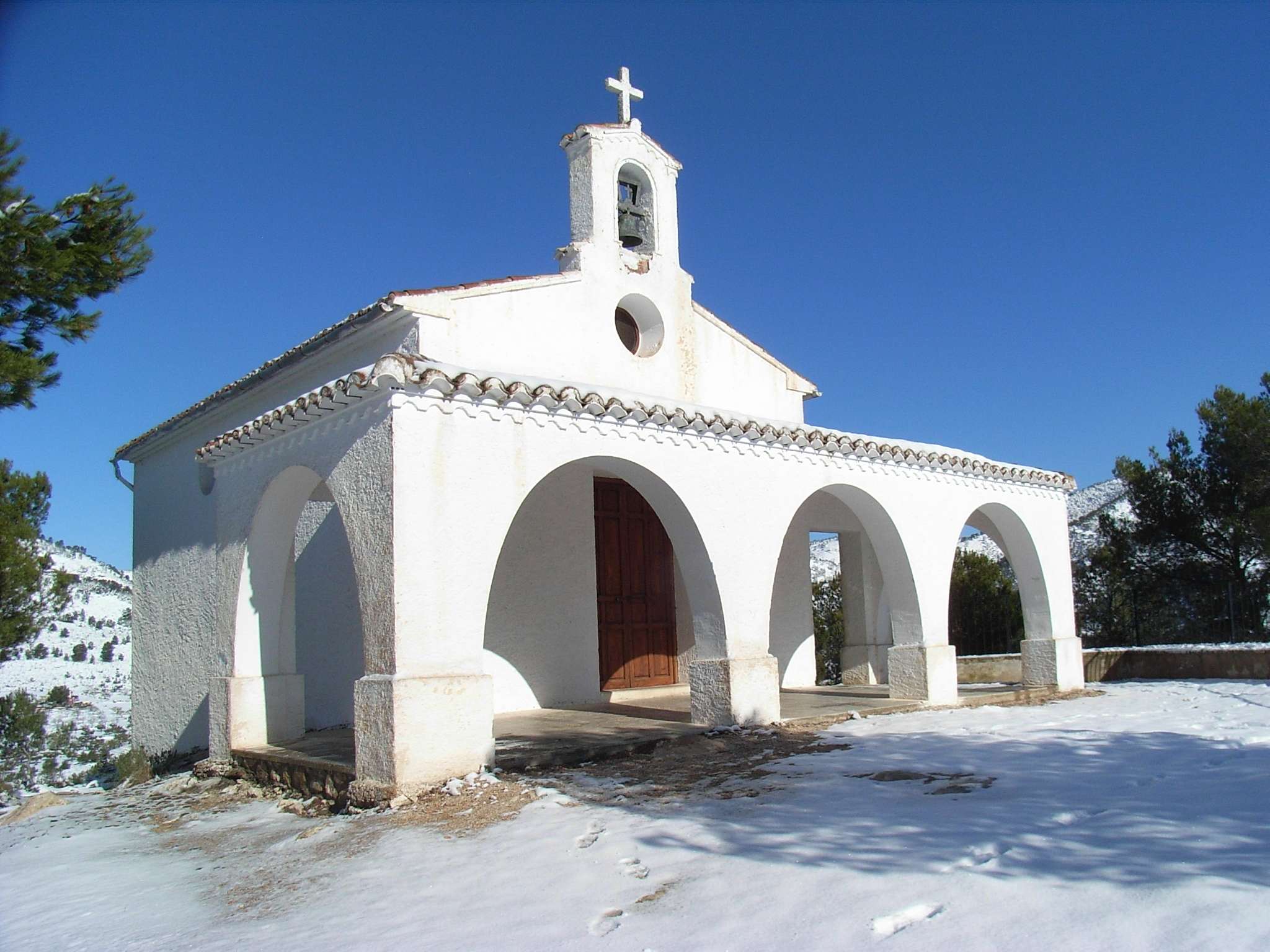
Shrine of Saint Isidore the Laborer.

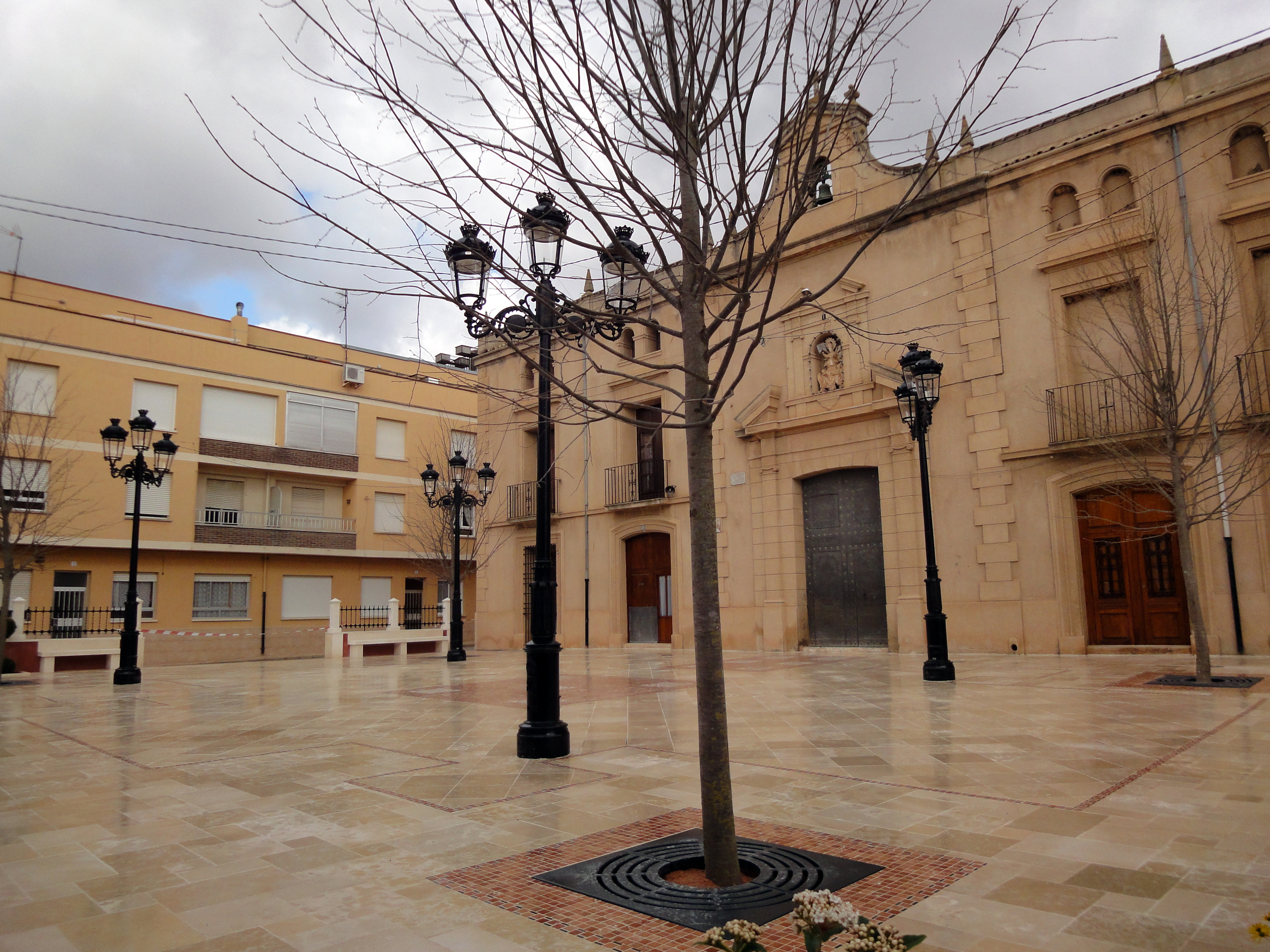
Glorieta of Beneixama

== See also ==
- Beneixama photovoltaic power plant
