= Alcoià =

Coordinates: 38°42′07″N 0°28′38″W

Alcoià Hoya de Alcoy
- Comarca
- Country: Spain
- Autonomous community: Valencian Community
- Province: Alacant / Alicante
- Capital and largest city: Alcoi / Alcoy
- Municipalities: 8 municipalities: Alcoi / Alcoy, Banyeres de Mariola, Benifallim, Castalla, Ibi, Onil, Penàguila, Tibi

Area
  - Total: 539.66 km^{2} (208.36 sq mi)

Population (2019)
  - Total: 109,196
  - Density: 202.34/km^{2} (524.06/sq mi)
- Time zone: UTC+1 (CET)
  - Summer (DST): UTC+2 (CEST)

Alcoià (Valencian: [alkoˈja]; Spanish: Hoya de Alcoy [ˈoʝa ðe alˈkoj]) is a comarca in the province of Alicante, Valencian Community, Spain.

== Municipalities ==
The comarca contains eight municipalities, listed below with their areas and populations:

Name	Population (2019)	Area (km^{2})	Elevation (AMSL)
Alcoi / Alcoy	58,994	129.86	562 m (1,844 ft)
Banyeres	7,068	50.28	816 m (2,677 ft)
Benifallim	105	13.69	734 m (2,408 ft)
Castalla	10,124	114.60	675 m (2,215 ft)
Ibi	23,489	62.52	816 m (2,677 ft)
Onil	7,507	48.41	697 m (2,286 ft)
Penàguila	292	49.92	685 m (2,247 ft)
Tibi	1,614	70.38	533 m (1,748 ft)
Totals	109,196	539.66	689 m (2,262 ft)

Municipalities of Alcoià
