= Campo de Mirra =

Campo de Mirra El Camp de Mirra
- Municipality
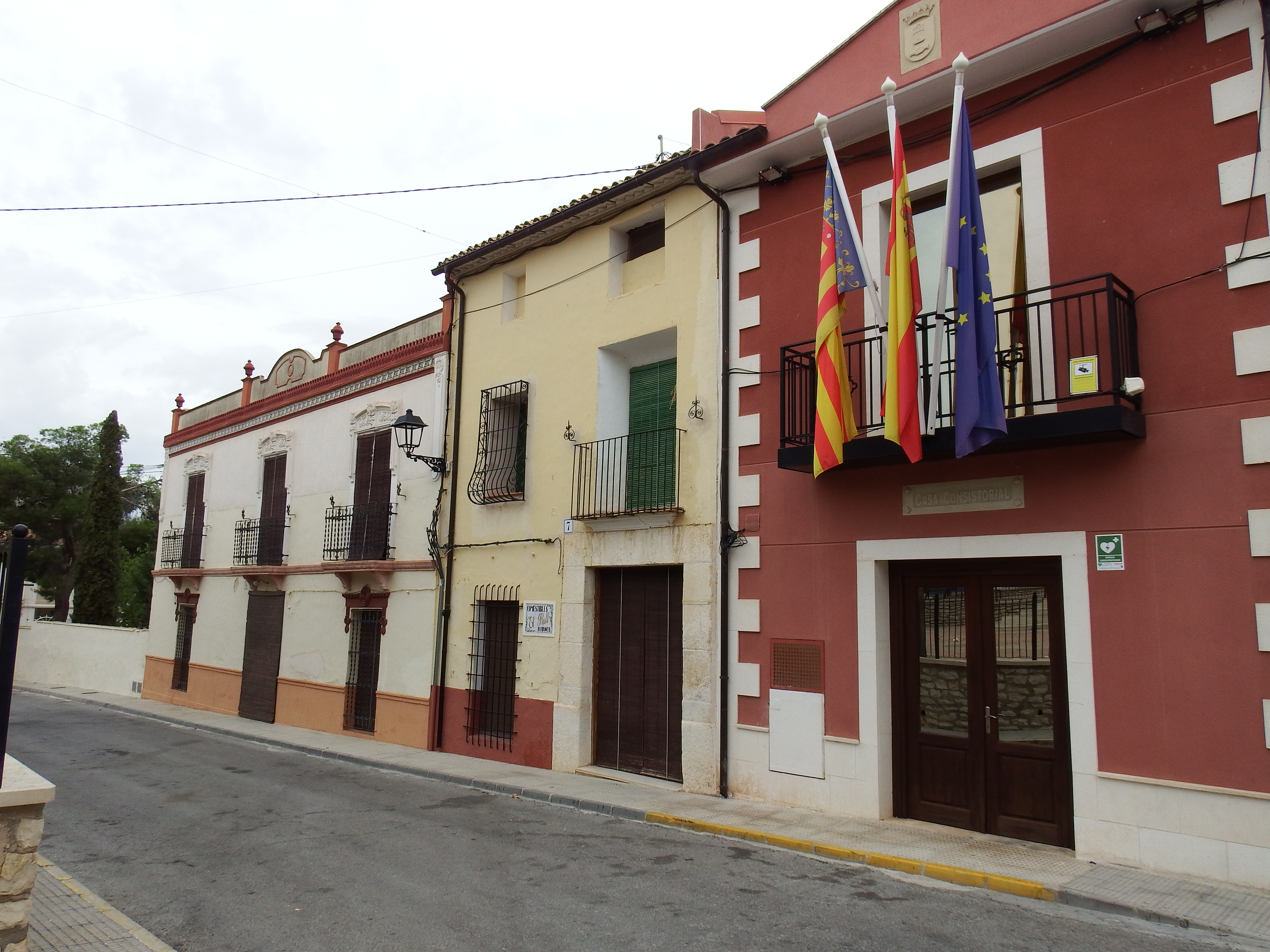
- Town hall

- Coat of arms

- Location in Spain
- Coordinates: 38°41′12″N 0°46′49″W
- Country: Spain
- Autonomous community: Valencian Community
- Province: Alicante
- Comarca: Alt Vinalopó
- Judicial district: Villena

Government
  - Mayor: Ramón Salvador Alfaro (PSPV-PSOE)

Area
  - Total: 21.8 km^{2} (8.4 sq mi)
- Elevation: 590 m (1,940 ft)

Population (2025-01-01)
  - Total: 447
  - Density: 20.5/km^{2} (53.1/sq mi)
- Demonym(s): mirrenc, -a (Val.) mirrense (Sp.)
- Time zone: UTC+1 (CET)
  - Summer (DST): UTC+2 (CEST)
- Postal code: 03469
- Official language(s): Valencian; Spanish
- Website: Official website

Campo de Mirra (Spanish: [ˈkampo ðe ˈmira]) or El Camp de Mirra (Valencian: [el kam(b) de ˈmira]), officially El Camp de Mirra / Campo de Mirra, is a municipality in the comarca of Alt Vinalopó in the Valencian Community, Spain.
