= Castle of Banyeres =

- Castell de Banyeres (Valencian)
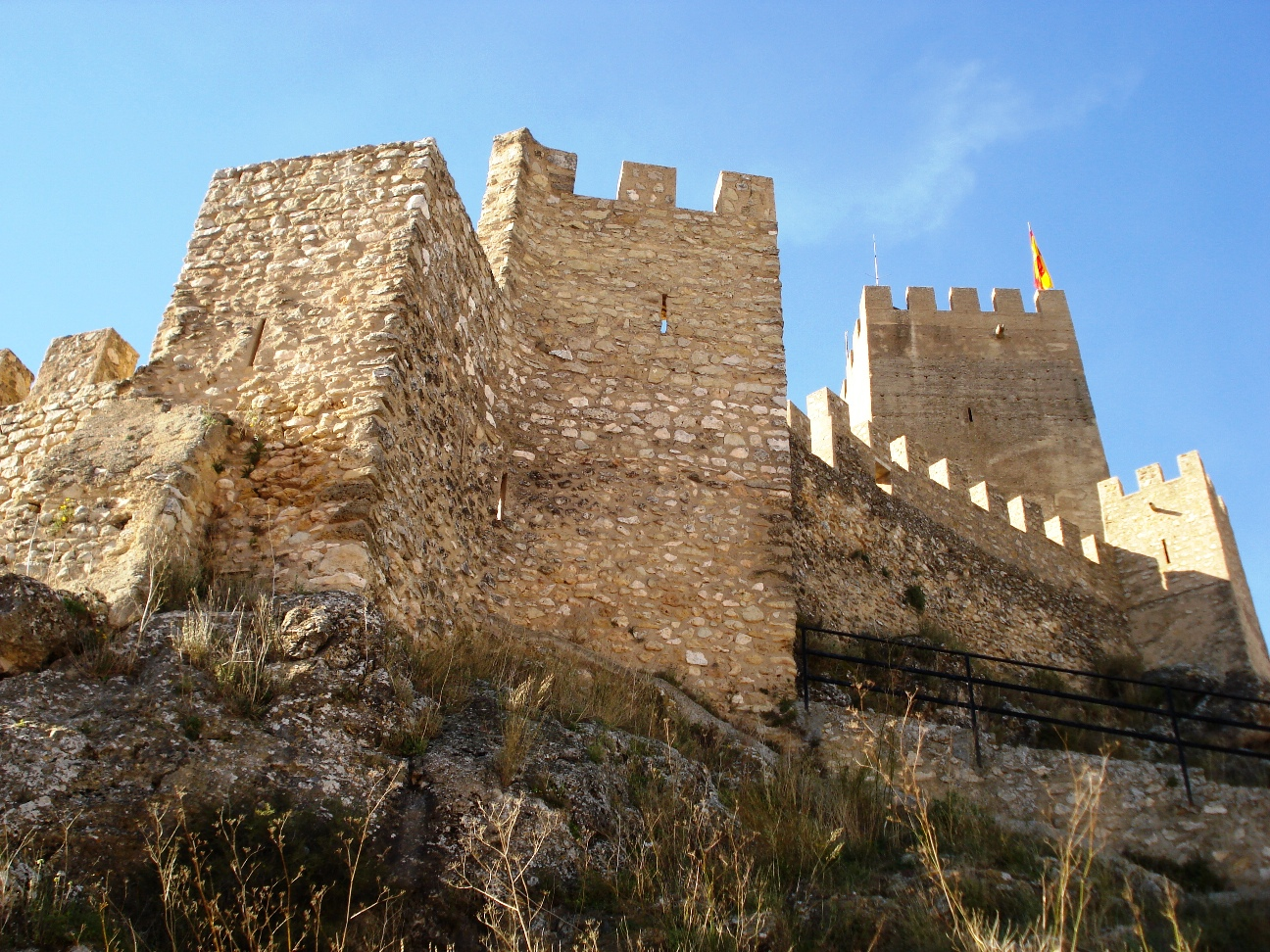

- Location within Spain
- 38.715544°N 0.657844°W
- Location: Banyeres de Mariola, (Valencian Community)

History
- Built: 13th century

Spanish Cultural Heritage
- Official name: Castell de Banyeres
- Type: Non-movable
- Criteria: Monument
- Designated: 2001
- Reference no.: 03.27.021-002

The castle of Banyeres (Alicante), Valencian Community (Spain), is an Almohad fortress built in the 13th century, which is situated on the tossal de l'Àguila (Valencian), English: 'Hill of the Eagle', in the geographical center of Banyeres, with an elevation of 830 meters above the sea level.

The castle, irregularly shaped, has two enclosures and adapts to the ground. His most significant element is his tower of 17 meters. It has a square ground plan and three heights and is made of rammed earth. The remains of walls, also made with mud, they have pockets made in later period and dominated the arches with voussoirs. Within the grounds there is a cistern and a chapel.

It is currently the headquarters of Banyeres festive museum (Museu Fester).

== History ==
The first historical record of the castle appears in 1249, when King James I of Aragon granted the castle and the town to the knight Jofré de Loaysa and his wife Jacometa. Later, in the 15th century, the castle was sold to the nearby town of Bocairent, remaining under its jurisdiction until Banyeres regained independence in 1628.

During the War of the Spanish Succession (1705), the castle served as a stronghold for the supporters of Philip V. It successfully resisted three sieges by Archduke Charles's troops. Due to this loyalty, the king awarded the town the titles of "noble, faithful, loyal, and royal," which are still featured on the municipal coat of arms.

== See also ==
- Route of the Castles of Vinalopó
- Barchell Castle
- Cocentaina Castle
