= Banyeres de Mariola =

Banyeres de Mariola Banyeres de Mariola (Valencian) Bañeres (Spanish)
- Municipality
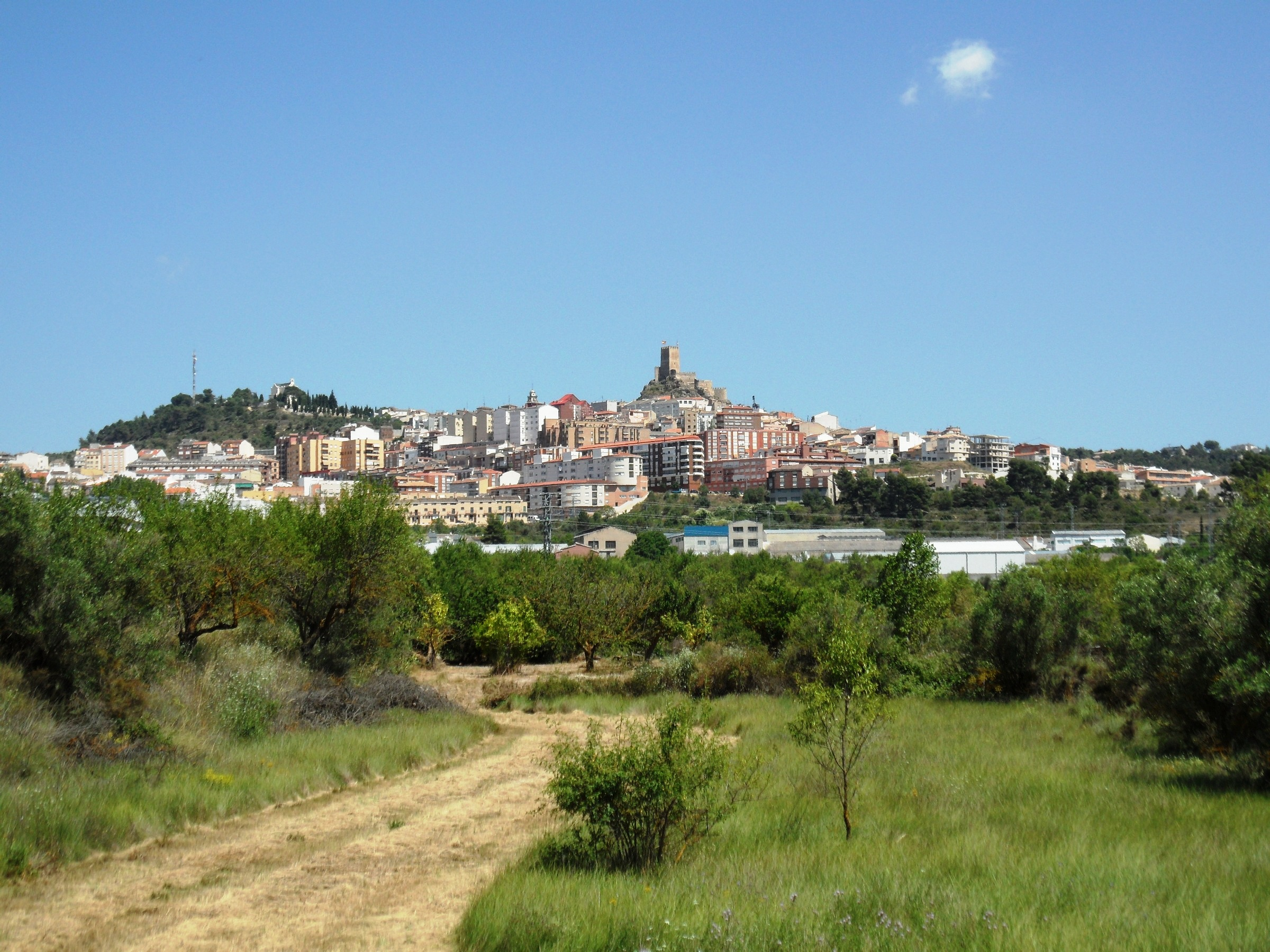
- View of Banyeres de Mariola

- Flag Coat of arms

- Location in Spain
- Coordinates: 38°42′57″N 0°39′26″W
- Country: Spain
- Autonomous community: Valencian Community
- Province: Alacant
- Comarca: Alcoià
- Judicial district: Alcoi

Government
  - Alcalde: Josep Sempere i Castelló (2019) (Compromís)

Area
  - Total: 50.28 km^{2} (19.41 sq mi)
- Elevation: 816 m (2,677 ft)

Population (2025-01-01)
  - Total: 7,347
  - Density: 146.1/km^{2} (378.5/sq mi)
- Demonyms: Banyerenc, banyerenca
- Time zone: UTC+1 (CET)
  - Summer (DST): UTC+2 (CEST)
- Postal code: 03450
- Official language(s): Valencian and Spanish
- Website: Official website

Banyeres de Mariola (Valencian: [baˈɲeɾez ðe maɾiˈɔla], also [maɾiˈɔlɔ]), known simply as Banyeres (Valencian: [baˈɲeɾes]; Spanish: Bañeres [baˈɲeɾes]), is a settlement and a municipality in the north of the province of Alicante (Spain), 860 metres above sea level, with a population of 7,500. The main employer is the local textile industry. The town has a Moorish castle that dates from 1214, and is surrounded by mountains, almond and olive trees.

From the 22 to the 25 April each year the town celebrates the Moros i Cristians (Moors and Christians) festival, commemorating the 13th century defeat by the Christians of the occupying Moorish rulers. It is a festival of pageantry, costume, and pyrotechnics.

== Climate ==
According to the Köppen climate classification, Banyeres has a Csa hot-summer mediterranean climate, highly influenced by the altitude and the distance from the sea, having also continental factors. The winters are cool, and the summers are hot during the day and mild during the night.

Climate data for Banyeres de Mariola
Month	Jan	Feb	Mar	Apr	May	Jun	Jul	Aug	Sep	Oct	Nov	Dec	Year
Mean daily maximum °C (°F)	11.2 (52.2)	11.9 (53.4)	14.5 (58.1)	16.8 (62.2)	20.2 (68.4)	24.8 (76.6)	28.5 (83.3)	28.7 (83.7)	25.4 (77.7)	20.2 (68.4)	15.4 (59.7)	12.1 (53.8)	19.1 (66.4)
Daily mean °C (°F)	6.4 (43.5)	7.0 (44.6)	9.1 (48.4)	11.3 (52.3)	14.6 (58.3)	19.0 (66.2)	22.3 (72.1)	22.7 (72.9)	19.6 (67.3)	14.9 (58.8)	10.4 (50.7)	7.5 (45.5)	13.8 (56.8)
Mean daily minimum °C (°F)	1.6 (34.9)	2.1 (35.8)	3.7 (38.7)	5.9 (42.6)	9.1 (48.4)	13.2 (55.8)	16.2 (61.2)	16.8 (62.2)	13.8 (56.8)	9.6 (49.3)	5.4 (41.7)	2.9 (37.2)	8.5 (47.3)
Average precipitation mm (inches)	35 (1.4)	39 (1.5)	43 (1.7)	53 (2.1)	49 (1.9)	36 (1.4)	15 (0.6)	23 (0.9)	49 (1.9)	71 (2.8)	58 (2.3)	48 (1.9)	519 (20.4)
Source: climate-data.org

== Main sights ==
- Castle of Banyeres
- Route of the Castles of Vinalopó

== See also ==
- Serra Mariola Natural Park
- Route of the Castles of Vinalopó
