= Alto Vinalopó =

Coordinates: 38°38′11″N 0°51′58″W

Alt Vinalopó / Alto Vinalopó
- Comarca
- Country: Spain
- Autonomous community: Valencian Community
- Province: Alacant / Alicante
- Capital and largest city: Villena
- Municipalities: 7 municipalities: Beneixama, Biar, Campo de Mirra, Cañada, Salinas, Sax, Villena

Area
  - Total: 644.76 km^{2} (248.94 sq mi)

Population (2019)
  - Total: 52,401
  - Density: 81.272/km^{2} (210.49/sq mi)
- Time zone: UTC+1 (CET)
  - Summer (DST): UTC+2 (CEST)

Alt Vinalopó (Valencian: [ˈald vinaloˈpo]) or Alto Vinalopó (Spanish: [ˈalto βinaloˈpo]) is a comarca in the province of Alicante, Valencian Community, Spain.

== Municipalities ==
The comarca contains seven municipalities, listed below with their areas and populations:

Name	Area in km^{2}	Population (2001)	Population (2011)	Population (2019)
Beneixama	34.89	1,816	1,771	1,685
Biar	98.17	3,539	3,719	3,671
Campo de Mirra	21.82	410	432	415
Cañada	19.33	1,213	1,240	1,220
Salinas	61.71	1,299	1,577	1,601
Sax	63.48	8,734	9,883	9,845
Villena	345.37	32,654	34,747	33,964
Totals	644.76	49,665	53,369	52,401

Municipalities of Alt Vinalopó
