= Onils Idrizaj =

Albanian footballer

Personal information
- Full name: Onils Idrizaj
- Date of birth: 23 February 1991 (age 35)
- Place of birth: Vlorë, Albania
- Height: 1.84 m (6 ft 1/2 in)
- Positions: Midfielder; forward

Youth career
- 2007–2011: Flamurtari

Senior career*
Years	Team	Apps	(Gls)
2010–2017	Flamurtari	17	(1)
2011	→ Apolonia (loan)		
2014	→ Tomori (loan)	9	(2)
2015	→ Sopoti (loan)	9	(3)
2017	→ Bylis (loan)		
- * Club domestic league appearances and goals as of 7 December 2016

Onils Idrizaj (born 23 February 1991 in Vlorë) is an Albanian football player. The forward most recently played for Flamurtari Vlorë in the Albanian Superliga.

== Honours ==
=== Flamurtari ===
- Albanian Cup (1): 2013–14
