= Route of the Castles of Vinalopó =

Historic and cultural route in Spain

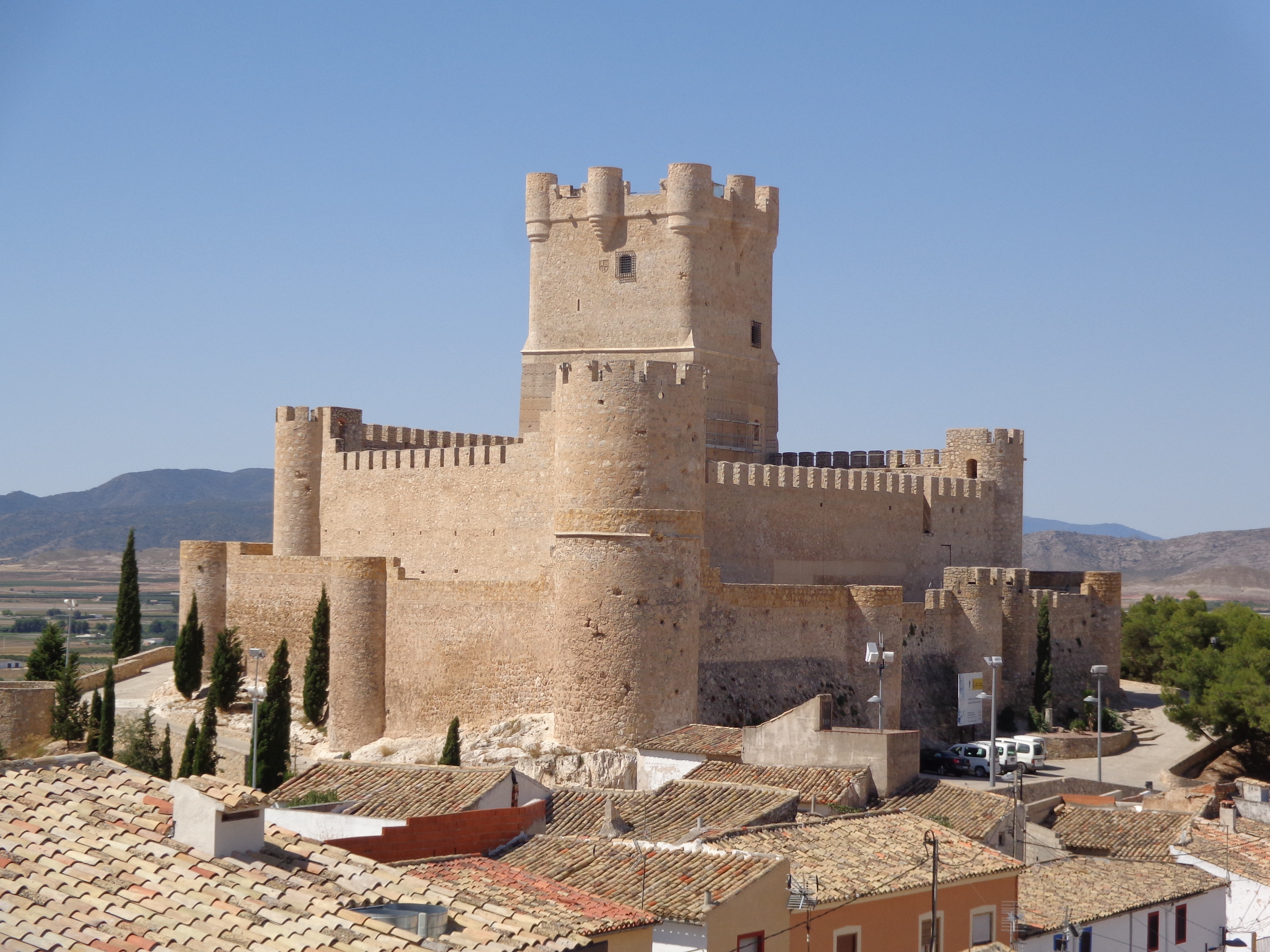
Atalaya Castle, in Villena

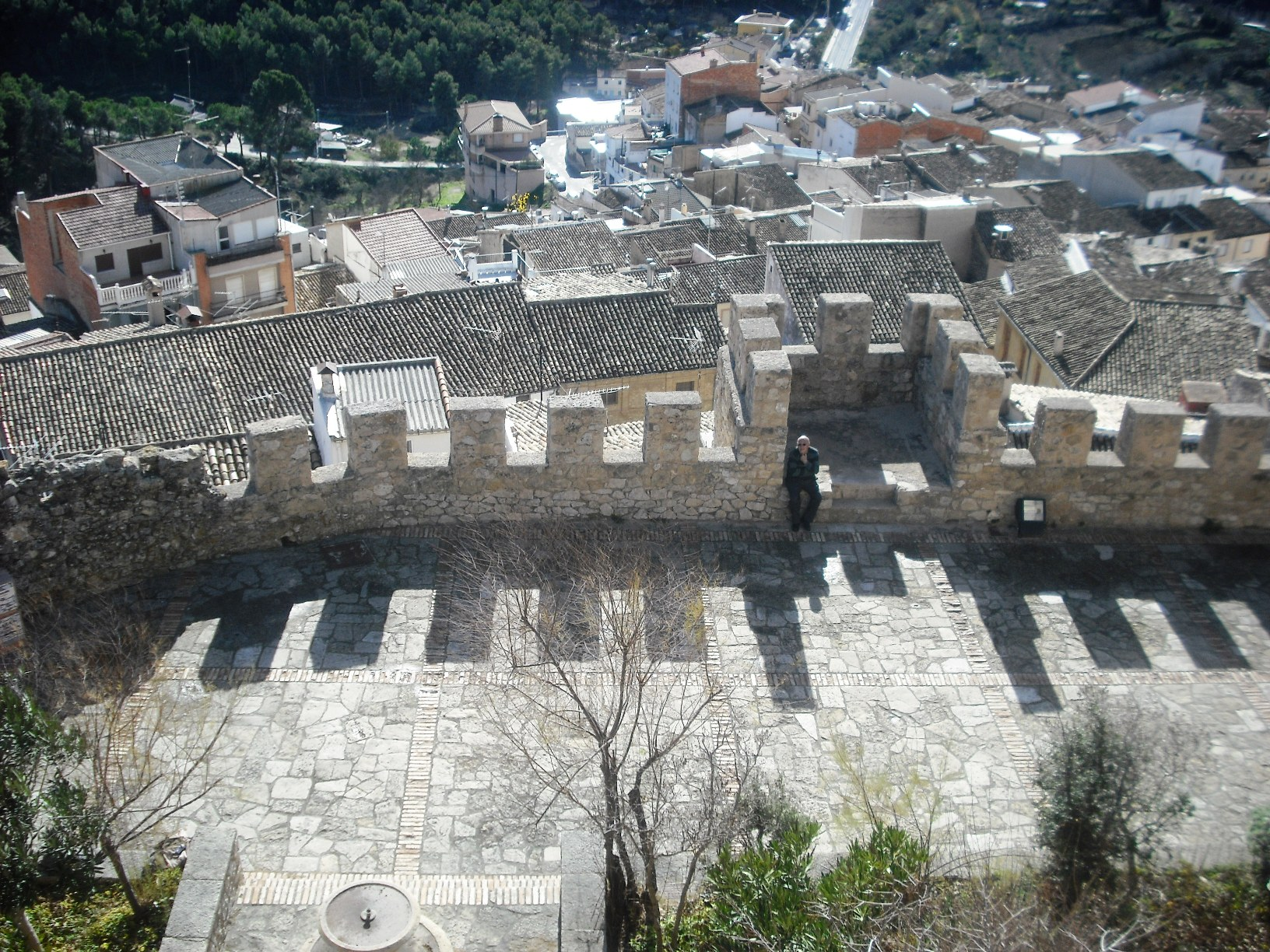
Castle of Banyeres, in Banyeres de Mariola

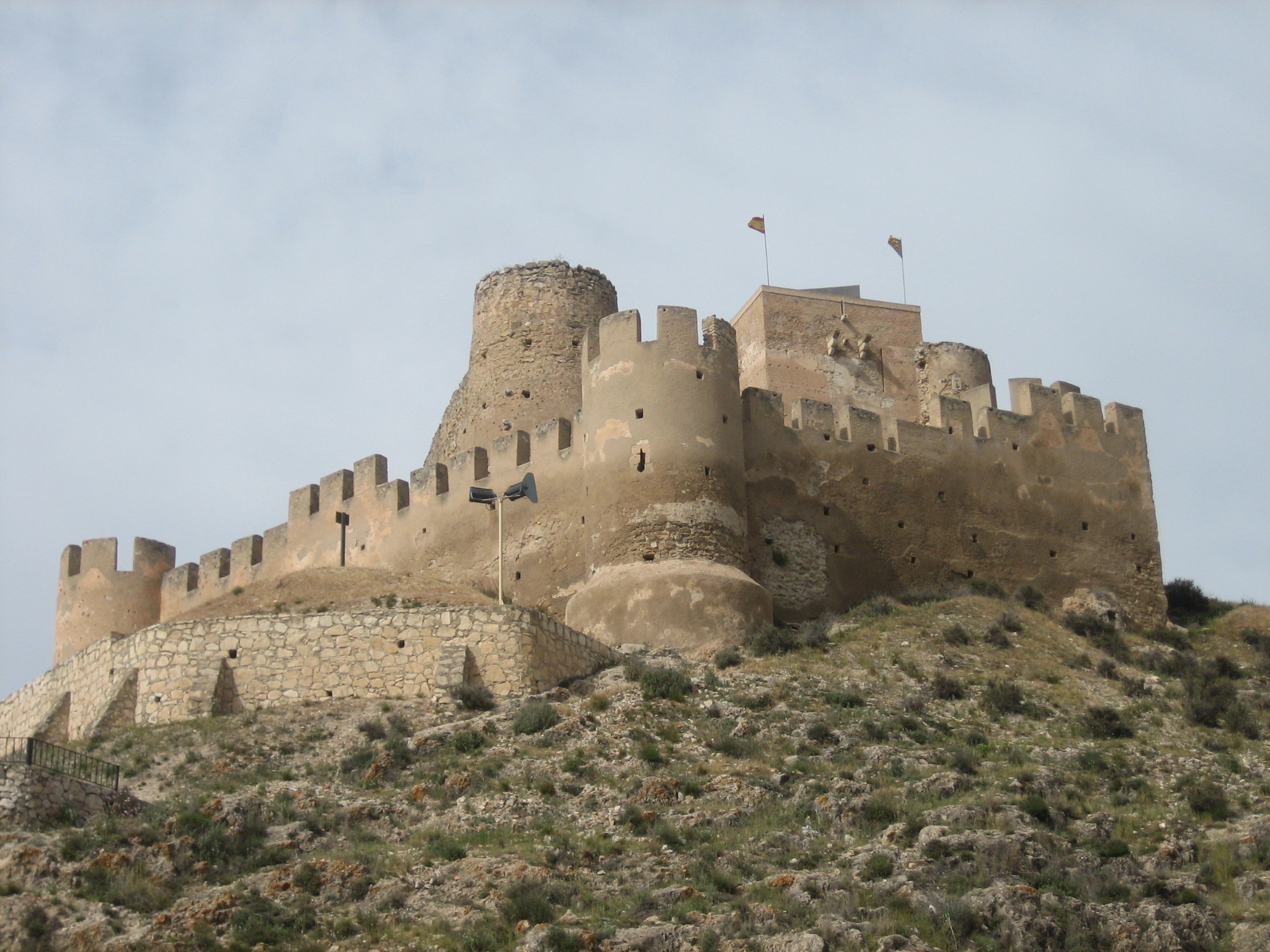
Castle of Biar

The Route of the castles of Vinalopó is a historic and cultural route located in the interior mountains of the Province of Alicante in Spain. It connects castles built to protect the populations of the Vinalopó Valley during the Middle Ages.

The route is about 75 kilometres long and passes through nine different municipalities in the valley, connecting numerous defensive castles and fortifications, among the most of any region in Spain, including those at Villena, Biar, Banyeres de Mariola, Castalla, Sax, Elda, Petrer or Novelda. They are a military and architectural heritage of the era of Muslim rule in Andalusia (Al-Andalus in Arabic), and later of Christian rule, when the area formed the borderlands between the Kingdom of Valencia and the Kingdom of Castile.

== Itinerary ==
The Route of the Castles of Vinalopó the following itinerary, in order:

- Atalaya Castle, in Villena
- Castle of Banyeres, in Banyeres de Mariola
- Castle of Biar, in Biar
- Castle of la Mola, in Novelda
- Castle de Elda, in Elda
- Altamira Palace, in Elche
- Castle of Castalla, in Castalla
- Castle of Sax, in Sax
- Castle of Petrel, in Petrer

== See also ==
- Route of the Monasteries of Valencia
- Route of the Borgias
- Route of the Valencian classics
