= Treaty of Tudilén =

1151 treaty between Castile and Barcelona

The Treaty of Tudilén (or Treaty of Tudején) was signed between Alfonso VII of León and Castile and Ramon Berenguer IV, Count of Barcelona on 27 January 1151 at Tudilén, near Aguas Caldas (Note: modern Baños de Fitero, then just Fitero) in Navarre.

== Contents ==
The partition of Navarre, after the death of García Ramírez of Navarre, was the paramount reason for the treaty. The pact recognised the Aragonese conquests south of the Júcar and the right to expand further south and west, while the Taifas of Murcia, Valencia and Denia were to fall to Ramon. The Kingdom of Portugal was to be destroyed, while Seville was to be shared between Alfonso and Ramon. Consequently, Ramon also agreed to pledge homage for the Taifa of Valencia and a substantial part of Murcia.

== Result ==
The treaty, however, was never implemented due to major offensives by the Almohad Caliphate, and was superseded by the Treaty of Cazola in March 1179.

== See also ==
- List of treaties

== Sources ==
- Barton, Simon (1997). The Aristocracy in Twelfth-Century León and Castile. Cambridge University Press.
- Barton, Simon (2009). A History of Spain. Palgrave Macmillan.
- Linehan, Peter (2011). Spain, 1157-1300: A Partible Inheritance. Blackwell Publishing.
