= Biar =

- Municipality
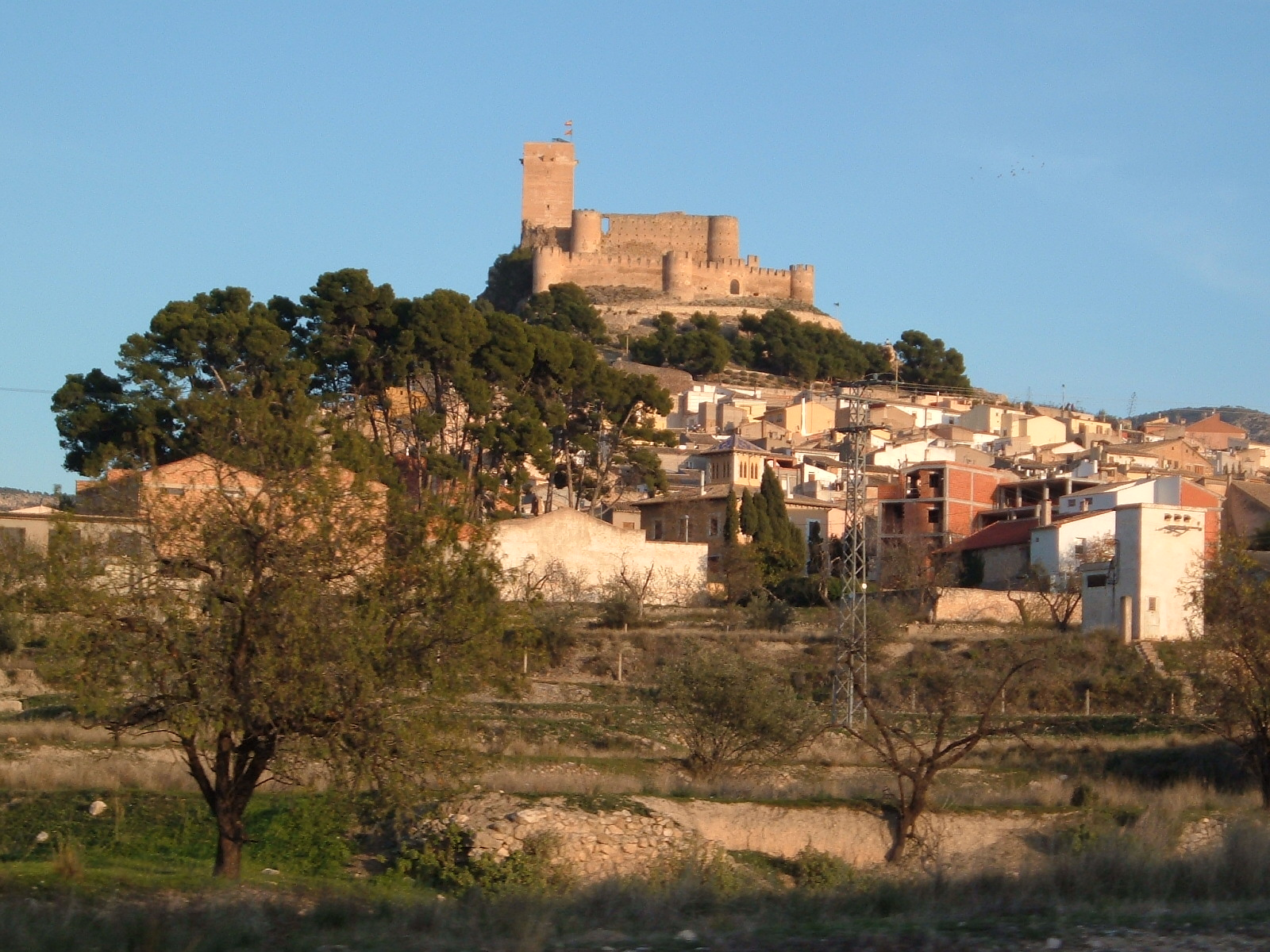
- Castle and town of Biar.

- Coat of arms

- Location in Spain
- Coordinates: 38°37′59″N 0°46′00″W
- Country: Spain
- Autonomous community: Valencian Community
- Province: Alicante
- Comarca: Alt Vinalopó
- Judicial district: Villena

Government
  - Alcalde: Julio L. Sanjuan Martínez (2015-present) (PSOE)

Area
  - Total: 98.17 km^{2} (37.90 sq mi)
- Elevation: 700 m (2,300 ft)

Population (2025-01-01)
  - Total: 3,677
  - Density: 37.46/km^{2} (97.01/sq mi)
- Demonym(s): Biarut, biaruda
- Time zone: UTC+1 (CET)
  - Summer (DST): UTC+2 (CEST)
- Postal code: 03410
- Official language(s): Valencian
- Website: Official website

Biar (Valencian: [biˈaɾ]; Spanish: [biˈaɾ]) is a town and municipality in the comarca of Alt Vinalopó, province of Alicante, Spain. Biar lies at the foot of the Serra de Mariola and is located 39 km from the city of Alicante.

The economy in Biar is based on manufacture, particularly dolls, and pottery.

On the origin of the name of this town there are two versions, one says that it comes from the Latin word apiarium meaning "place of bees", justifying this giving the importance that Biar had as a producer and exporter of honey, and the other says it is derived from the Arabic word (biʿar) "well" o بِئَار (biʿār) "wells"

== Events ==
The Moros i Cristians festival of Biar is celebrated each year from May 10 to 13.

== See also ==
- Castle of Biar
- Route of the Castles of Vinalopó
