= Gaianes =

Gaianes Gaianes (Valencian) Gayanes (Spanish)
- Municipality
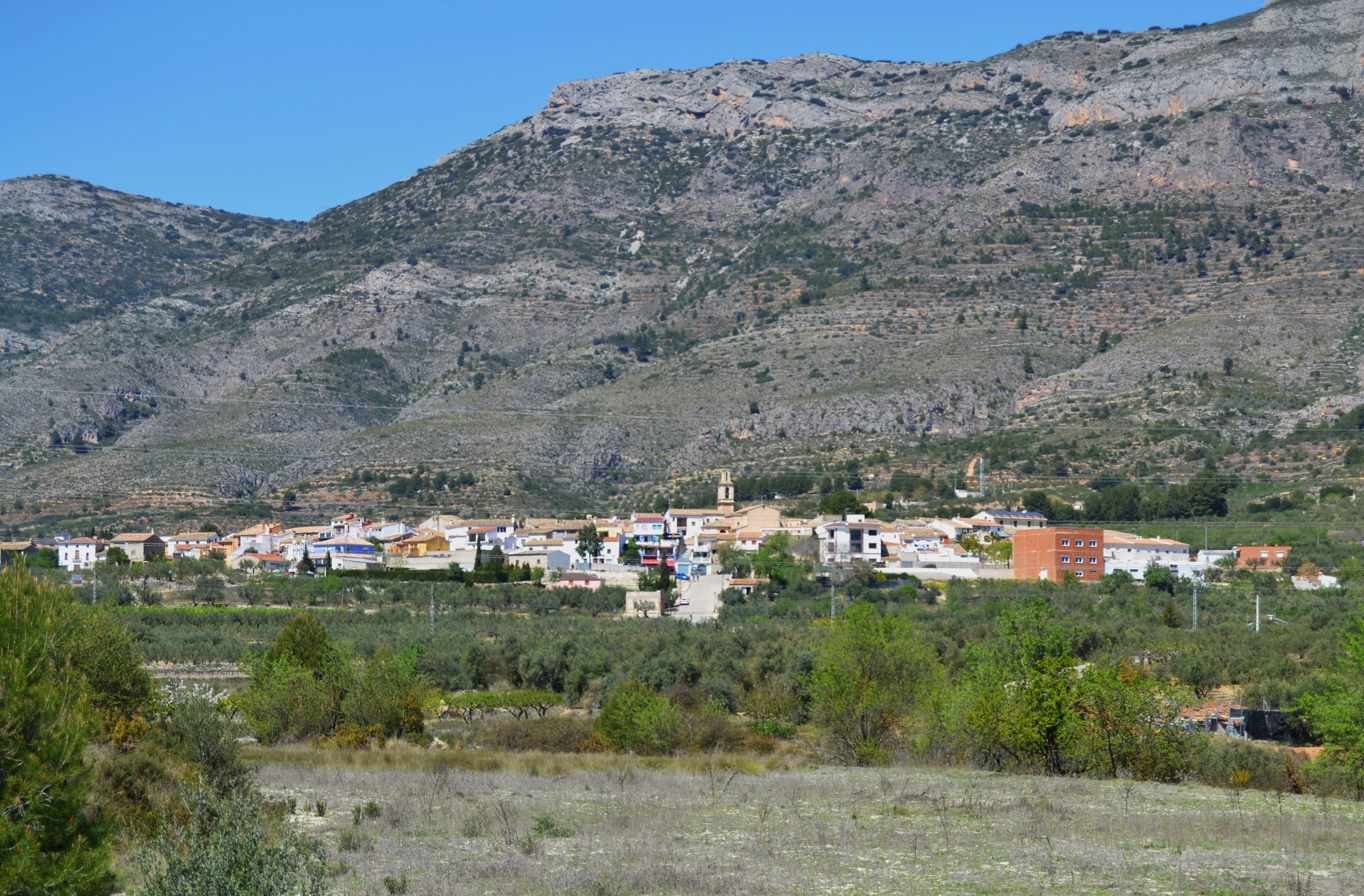
- Gaianes vist des de l'albufera

- Coat of arms

- Location within the Valencian Community
- Coordinates: 38°48′46″N 0°24′30″W
- Country: Spain
- Autonomous community: Valencian Community
- Province: Alicante
- Comarca: Comtat
- Judicial district: Alcoi

Government
  - Alcalde: Agustín Martínez Torregrosa (PSOE)

Area
  - Total: 960 km^{2} (370 sq mi)
- Elevation: 420 m (1,380 ft)

Population (2025-01-01)
  - Total: 577
  - Density: 0.60/km^{2} (1.6/sq mi)
- Demonym(s): Gayanero, gayanera
- Time zone: UTC+1 (CET)
  - Summer (DST): UTC+2 (CEST)
- Postal code: 03840
- Official language(s): Valencian
- Website: Official website

Gaianes (Valencian: [ɡaˈjanes]; Spanish: Gayanes [ɡaˈʝanes]) is a municipality in the comarca of Comtat, Alicante, Valencia, Spain.

== Main sights ==
- Gayanes Castle, small castle in charge of the vigilance of the Serpis river. It is possible to observe the principal tower and some parts of the old walls. Nowadays it is in ruins.
- Gayanes Town Hall, located in a former manor house close to the church.
- San Jaime Apostol Church, building of architectural interest. Built in 1526 on the site of a mosque.
- San Francisco de Paula Hermitage, dates back of beginning of the 18th century. In the local holidays, the pilgrimage is realized on Sunday to the hermitage, being an emotive act and taking the Saint Francisco de Paula's image.

== Natural areas ==
- Albufera of Gayanes, a lagoon located in Gayanes, natural space for the biodiversity of flora and fauna.
- Benicadell, a mountainous formation in whose skirts Gayanes is situated. It is placed in the Serra Mariola Natural Park, between the provinces of Alicante and Valencia.
- Serpis River, that across Gayanes.
- Green route of the Serpis River, a route by the former tracing of the Ferrocarril Alcoy Gandia constructed in 1892, to his step along Gayanes.
