= Albufera de Gaianes =

Coordinates: 38°48′20″N 0°24′02″W

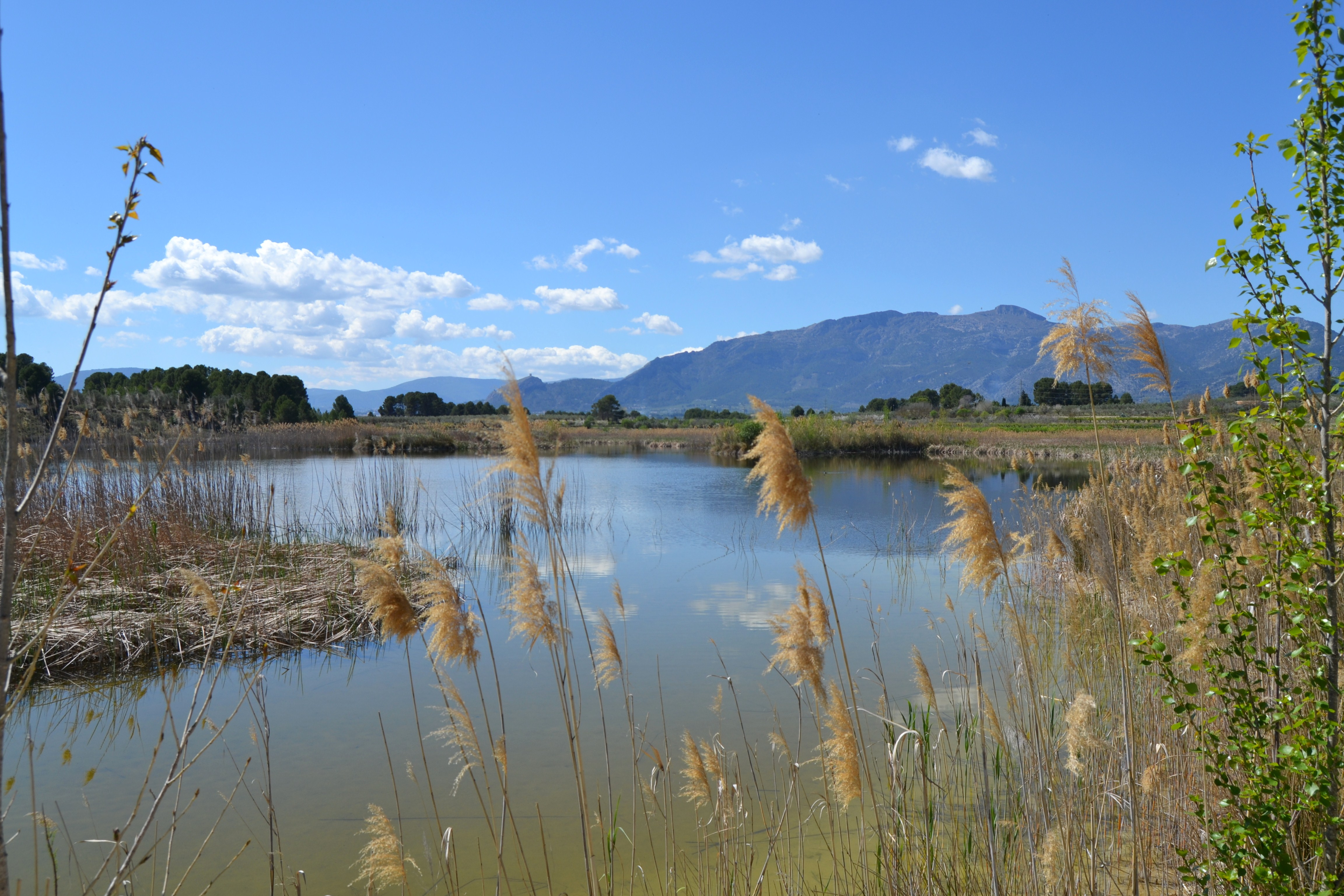
- Albufera of Gaianes
- Interactive map of Albufera de Gaianes
- Location: Gaianes (Alicante) Valencian Community, Spain
- Area: 11.20 ha (27.7 acres)
- Created: 2007
- Governing body: Generalitat Valenciana

The Albufera de Gaianes (Valencian: [albuˈfeɾa ðe ɣaˈjanes]) (Note: Albufera meaning "lagoon" in Valencian, from Arabic البحيرة al-buhayra, "small sea".) is a freshwater lagoon in the municipality of Gaianes (Alicante), Valencian Community, in eastern Spain.

It is an endorheic basin lagoon whose waters enter the Serpis river. Its existence is documented from the beginning of 15th century. The former lagoon was desiccated to avoid disease during the Spanish Civil War. In 2004, after a few strong rains, the natural space recovered.

In 2007 the lagoon was included in the natural space landscape protected are of the Serpis river. It became a natural protected space supporting a diversity of flora and fauna.

The lagoon is frequented by migratory birds, nidificantes and invernantes. It supports autochthonous turtles. It is surrounded by dryland fields.

== Other Albuferes ==
- Albufera de València

== See also ==
- Index: Special Protection Areas of Spain
