= Cercanías Murcia/Alicante =

Commuter rail service in Spain

Cercanías Alicante

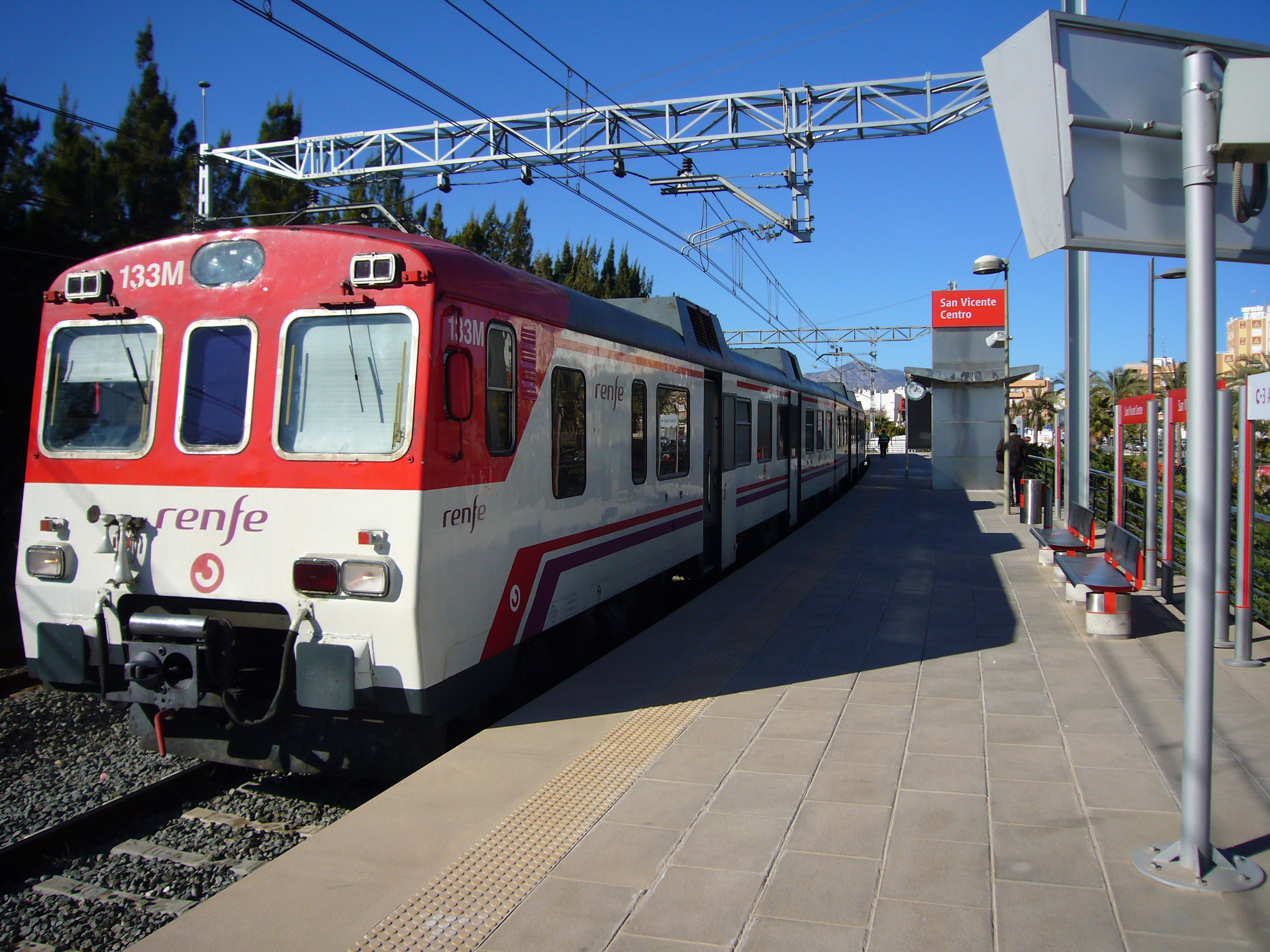
- Cercanías train in Sant Vicent Centre

Overview
- Owner: Renfe
- Locale: Alicante, Murcia, Elche
- Transit type: Commuter rail
- Number of lines: 3
- Number of stations: 26
- Annual ridership: 3,730,000 (2017)

Operation
- Operator: Cercanías

Technical
- System length: 202 km (126 mi)
System map

Cercanías Murcia/Alicante (Valencian: Rodalia de Múrcia/Alacant) is a commuter rail service (cercanías) in the provinces of Alicante and Murcia. The line connects Alicante (Alacant) and Murcia with Sant Vicent del Raspeig, Elche (Elx), Orihuela, Totana, Lorca, and Águilas. It runs through 200 km of railways with a total of 26 stations.

== Lines ==
The cercanías consists of three lines. Line C-1 connects Alicante and Murcia by 1 or 2 trains per hour. Line C-2 connects Murcia and Águilas. Line C-3 connects Alicante and Sant Vicent del Raspeig with about eight trains per day.

Line	Route	Distance
	Alicante - Elche - Murcia del Carmen	76 km
	Murcia del Carmen - Lorca - Águilas	117 km
	Alicante - University of Alicante - Sant Vicent Centre	8 km

=== Line C-1 ===
The railroad linking the cities of Alicante and Murcia was built in 1885. It passes Elche through a tunnel of 4 km in length, which was built in 1970s, eliminating over twenty level crossings in the city, and includes 2 underground stops Elche-Carrús/Elx-Carrús and Elche-Parque/Elx-Parc. The average travel time between Alicante and Murcia is 1 hour and 20 minutes.

Since June 15, 2008 trains no longer stop at Beniaján, Torreagüera, and Los Ramos-Alquerías.

Line C-1 Cercanías Murcia/Alicante
Murcia del Carmen | Beniel | Orihuela | Callosa de Segura | Albatera-Catral | Crevillente/Crevillent | Elche-Carrús/Elx-Carrús | Elche-Parque/Elx-Parc | Torrellano | San Gabriel/Sant Gabriel | Alicante

=== Line C-2 ===
One train per hour circulates on line C-2 between Murcia and Lorca, with only three daily trains running to Águilas. The average travel time between Murcia and Lorca is 50 minutes and 1 hour 50 minutes between Murcia and Águilas.

Line C-2 Cercanías Murcia/Alicante
Murcia del Carmen | Alcantarilla-Los Romanos | Librilla | Alhama de Murcia | Totana | La Hoya | Lorca-San Diego | Lorca-Sutullena | Puerto Lumbreras | Almendricos | Pulpí | Jaravía | Águilas-El Labradorcico | Águilas

=== Line C-3 ===
The railroad between Madrid and Alicante was built in the nineteenth century, but it was not used for local traffic until 2007 when line C-3 was opened. The line is 8 km long and it takes about 12 minutes to get from Alicante to Sant Vicent del Raspeig.

Line C-3 Cercanías Murcia/Alicante
Alicante | University of Alicante | Sant Vicent Centre

== Future expansion ==
=== Alicante Airport rail link ===
The new terminal of Alicante–Elche Airport was built with space allocated for a railway station and an Alicante Tram stop. In 2019, the Generalitat Valenciana granted €50,000 towards a feasibility study in connecting Alicante Airport to the rail network. The same year, the Ministry of Development put out to tender the contract to build the airport rail link.

=== Tren de la Costa ===
The Tren de la Costa proposes a new rail line linking Valencia to Alicante via coastal towns as an extension of Cercanías Valencia's C-1, into which a study was produced in 2016.

=== Torrevieja branch ===
A 27.3 km (17.0 mi) branch line from San Isidro–Albatera–Catral station to Torrevieja was formerly in operation from 1884 to 1986.

Since the 1990s reopening of the line has been proposed, as since the line's closure the town has become an important tourist destination.

In 2020, the University of Alicante proposed a branch from a new location – Orihuela – to Torrevieja serving stations at Bigastro-Jacarilla and San Miguel de Salinas. The cost of the line was estimated to be between €210 and €270 million for a single-track line capable of speeds of 200 km/h (120 mph), with ridership of 1.1 million expected annually.

=== Further proposals ===
Line C-3 is due to expand from Sant Vicente Centre using the existing line to Madrid as far as Villena, with the potential to add 2,000 daily rail passengers to the network.

The existing rail line from Murcia to Cartagena is currently only served by Renfe Media Distancia services, and a Cercanías service has been proposed to enhance service frequency.

Proposals exist to link the future Elche–Matola AVE station (part of the Madrid–Levante high-speed rail network) to the Cercanías network by way of a new 4 km (2.5 mi) line south of Elche, at a projected cost of €32 million. This would allow services through Elche city centre to terminate at the AVE station.
