= Los Montesinos =

- Municipality of Spain in the Valencian Community
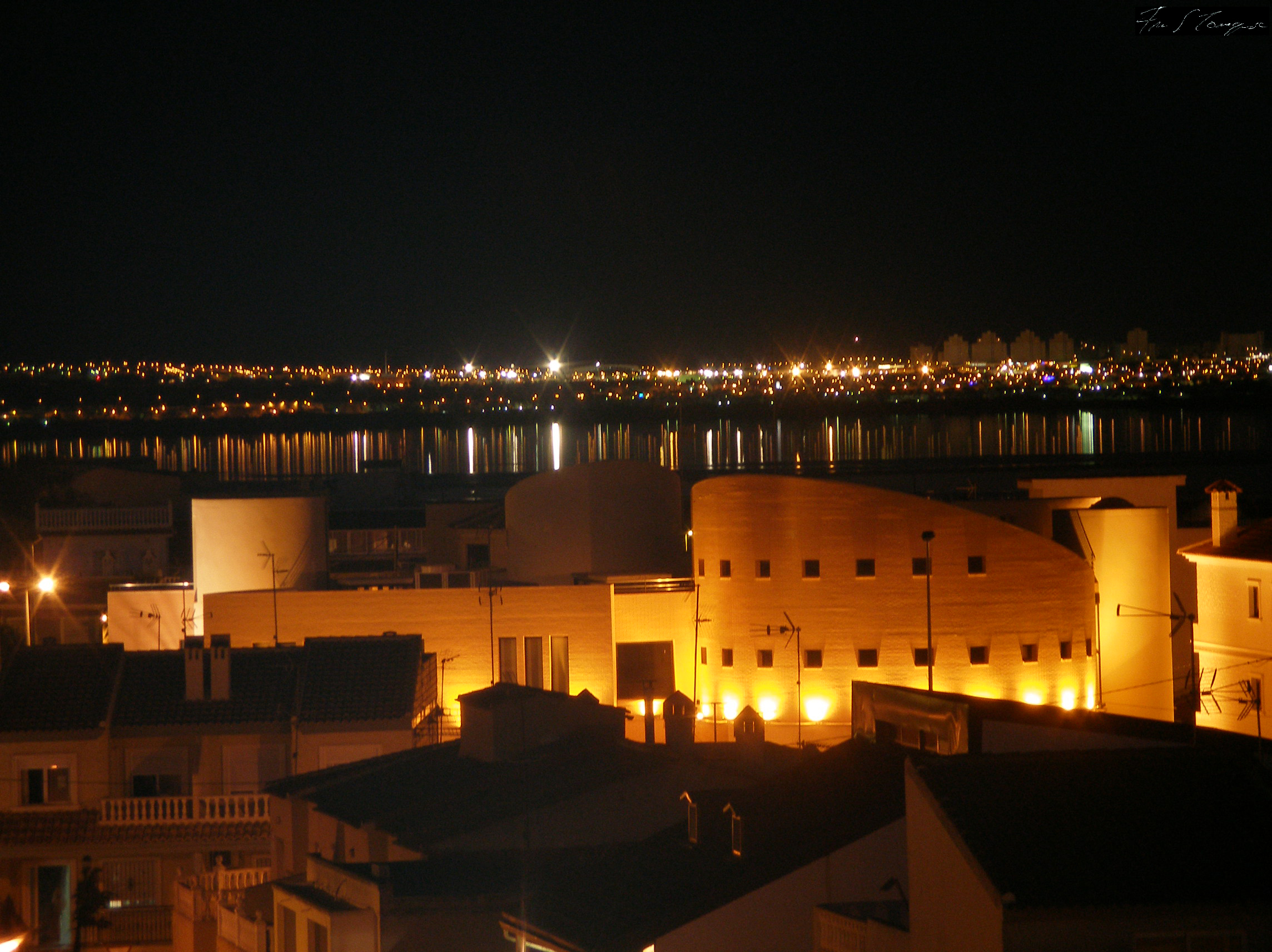
- Town Hall by night

- Flag Coat of arms
- Interactive map of Los Montesinos
- Los Montesinos (Spain) Los Montesinos (Europe) Los Montesinos (Earth)
- Coordinates: 38°1′41″N 0°44′31″W
- Country: Spain
- Autonomous community: Valencian Community
- Province: Alicante
- Comarca: Vega Baja del Segura
- Judicial district: Torrevieja

Government
  - Mayor: José Manuel Butrón Sánchez (PSPV-PSOE)

Area
  - Total: 15.05 km^{2} (5.81 sq mi)
- Elevation: 7 m (23 ft)

Population (2025-01-01)
  - Total: 5,786
  - Density: 384.5/km^{2} (995.7/sq mi)
- Demonym(s): Montesinero,-a
- Time zone: UTC+1 (CET)
  - Summer (DST): UTC+2 (CEST)
- Postal code: 03187
- Area codes: 965 and 966
- Website: http://www.losmontesinos.es

Los Montesinos is a municipality located in the south of the province of Alicante in the comarca of Vega Baja del Segura, Valencian Community, Spain. It has a population of 5,682 inhabitants (INE 2024). It is a Spanish-speaking municipality, in which Spanish has legally recognized linguistic predominance.

== Geography ==
The municipality is located in the extreme south of the province of Alicante and the Valencian Community, in the lands that have traditionally made up the "field or dry land", far from the orchard or irrigated lands. by the Segura River. This town is accessed from Alicante via the A-7 to connect with the CV-945.

Regarding climatic characteristics, aridity and rainfall irregularity are the most notable climatic characteristics and with the greatest geographical impact. In general, the climate of the area is characterized by very mild temperatures, with an average of over 10 °C in the coldest month.

=== Bordering towns ===
It limits with the municipal terms of Algorfa, Almoradí, Rojales, San Miguel de Salinas and Torrevieja.

== History ==
The territorial demarcation of Los Montesinos belonged to the municipality of Almoradí from the 16th century until 1990, in which the traditional guardianship that this population had exercised ended. By Decree 140/90 of the Consell de la Generalidad Valenciana, Los Montesinos became an independent municipality.

Its appearance is related to the establishment of irrigation areas in the area adjacent to the Torrevieja salt flats, through the Canal de los Riegos de Levante. The name of the town possibly comes from the surname of a former owner who gave name to a farm that gave rise to the current urban center.

== Population ==
It has a population of 5,682 inhabitants (INE 2024)

Nationality in Los Montesinos (2022)
Nationality	Men	Women	Total	%	Proportion
Spanish	1704	1583	3287	63.0%	
Foreign	953	977	1930	37.0%	

Demographic Evolution of Los Montesinos
	1991	1996	1998	1999	2000	2001	2002	2003	2004	2005	2006	2007	2009	2010	2011	2012	2013	2014	2015	2016
Population	2.232	2.436	2.472	2.526	2.617	2.674	2.807	2.964	3.081	3.319	3.654	4.284	4.949	5.147	5.199	5.203	5.043	4.966	4.921	4.912

== Economy ==
Regarding its economic situation, the main factors that have led to the economic development of this population center have been the expansion of irrigation and tourism. Over the course of the 29th century, favorable economic conditions were gradually consolidated through engineering works, which allowed the arrival of water contributions to the dry land. On the other hand, these were complemented by activities derived from tourism development and real estate growth that has occurred on the coast since the 1980s.

It has a prosperous agriculture, mainly citrus and vegetables, which also generates an important agri-food industry. Industrial activity is represented by the manufacture of construction materials and metal carpentry items and metal structures, as well as canned fish.

== Schools ==
Municipal Music School. In which its students, throughout the course, hold auditions and concerts to which anyone who wishes can attend.

School for adults. The following levels are taught: New readers, Literacy, School Graduate I and School Graduate II, Spanish for Foreigners and Basic English.

Municipal Sports Schools. In the town there is a wide variety of sports services such as: training 2/3 days a week depending on the modality, qualified instructors, quarterly report to parents, training report when formalizing registration, medical check-up for all those enrolled, athlete's card and participation in activities organized by the Department.

== Places of interest ==
- Cistern of the La Marquesa farm. Cistern with barrel vault and settling basin. Its existence is documented in the mid-18th century, coinciding with the establishment of settlers; carried out by the Oriolano Jesuits, owners of the property, to guarantee the water supply to this first population center.
- Cistern of Lo de Reig. Located on the Lo de Reig farm, along with the others mentioned above, it reflects the importance that water storage has had for our ancestors. This cistern is an exponent of the typical water architecture of Campo de Salinas, which can be dated to the 18th century coinciding with the putting into operation of the property by its owner. It is formed by a rectangular cistern (35m x 6m) excavated in the subsoil, whose masonry and lime mortar work has a half-barrel vault, with three circular perforations as a vent.
- Cistern of Lo de Vigo Viejo. It is an exponent of the water architecture so typical in the dry land of Bajo Segura. It is a construction of lime mortar and caliche stone, covered with plaster. The building comprises two parts, an exterior one topped with a hexagonal chapel.
- Hermitage of the Virgin of the Rosary
- Church of Our Lady of the Pillar. It was built in 1886, a fact that shows the consolidation of the human settlement that emerged spontaneously in the vicinity of the Torrevieja lagoon, through the appropriation of a public space, occupied since the mid-19th century. It has a central nave, two smaller sides, space dedicated to the main altar, choir and tower.
- Windmill. They are remains of an old flour mill in Finca Las Moreras.
- Departure from La Marquesa. Improved dryland area that took advantage of rainwater from nearby elevations for irrigation. Its settlement dates back to Roman times and is attested by the existence of archaeological remains in the vicinity, as well as by the passage through the estate of the Vía Augusta. Likewise, from the Islamic period the so-called Tesorillo de La Marquesa is preserved, a set of Arab coins from the 10th and 11th centuries, found in 1974. The property was part of the immense territorial heritage owned by the noble house of Rafal. In 1695, by testamentary disposition of Mrs. Mª Manuela Valenzuela y Vázquez Fajardo, Marchioness of Rafal, this property and another adjoining one were donated to the Company of Jesus. This settlement that, over time, was the origin of the Los Montesinos hamlet.
- Plaza Mayor of the Sacred Heart.
- Via Augusta.
- The White Virgin.
- Botanical Garden July 30.
- Herrada Parks.

== Festivities ==
- Patronal festivities. They are celebrated in honor of the Lady of the Pillar starting on October 12. In them, various acts are carried out such as the Pilgrimage to the Marquesa, the offering of flowers to the Lady of the Pillar, the Floats in which the majority of the town dresses up and travels through the streets to cheer up both their residents of the town and the visitors, etc.
- Anniversary of segregation. July 30.

== Politics ==
It is constituted as a municipality by segregation of the municipality of Almoradí, according to Decree 140/1990, of July 30, of the Consell de la Generalidad Valenciana, by which part of the Municipal term of Almoradí (Alicante) is segregated to constitute an independent Municipality with the denomination of Los Montesinos. DOGV no. 1365 (August 17, 1990).

Since its segregation in 1990, the Los Montesinos City Council has been governed by José Manuel Butrón Sánchez, from the municipal group of the PSPV-PSOE.
