= Daya Vieja =

- Municipality
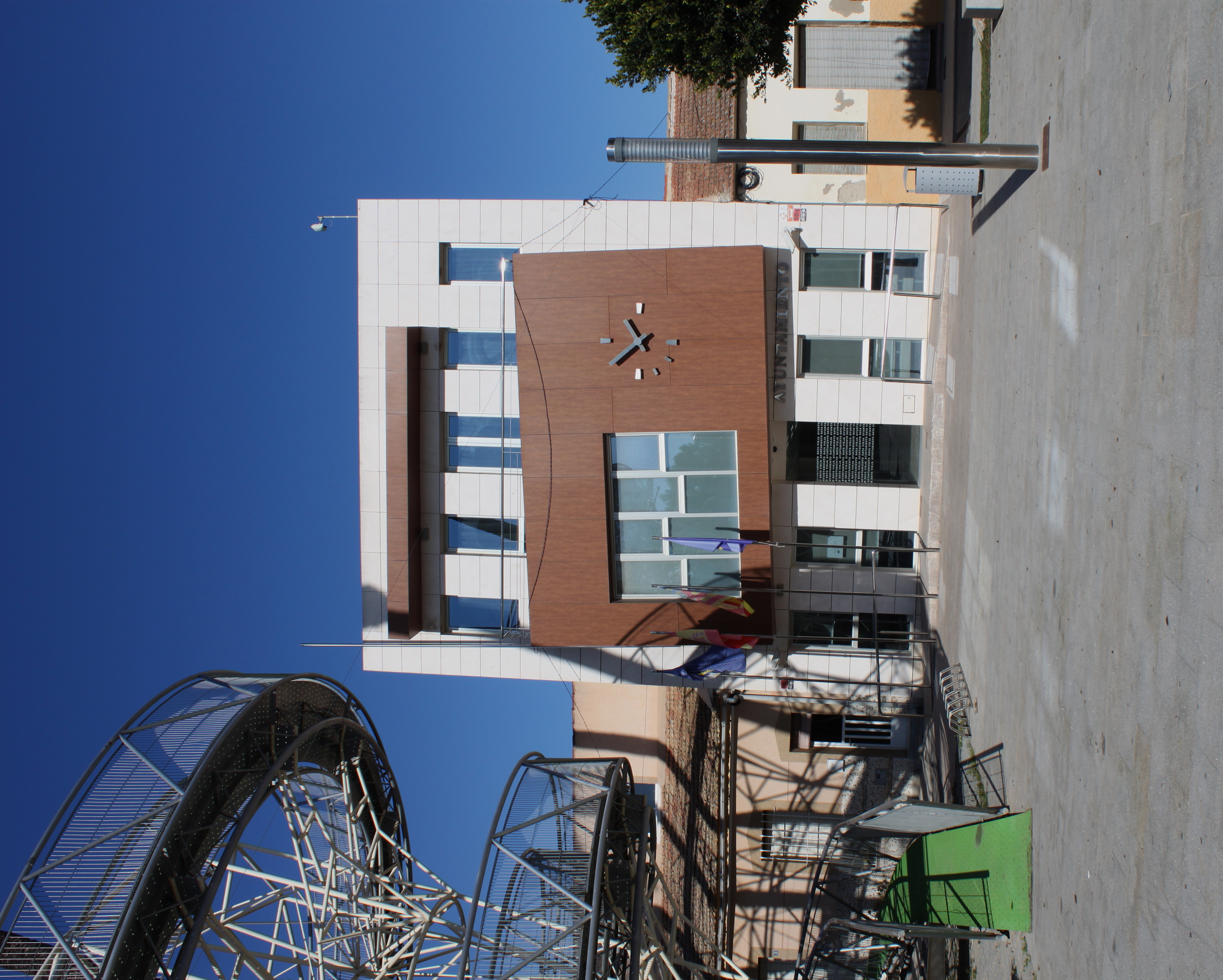
- Town hall

- Coat of arms

- Location in Spain
- Coordinates: 38°6′17″N 0°44′18″W
- Country: Spain
- Autonomous community: Valencian Community
- Province: Alicante
- Comarca: Vega Baja del Segura
- Judicial district: Orihuela

Government
  - Alcalde: José Vicente Fernández Costa (2019) (Compromís)

Area
  - Total: 3.1 km^{2} (1.2 sq mi)
- Elevation: 4 m (13 ft)

Population (2025-01-01)
  - Total: 698
  - Density: 230/km^{2} (580/sq mi)
- Demonym: Dayense
- Time zone: UTC+1 (CET)
  - Summer (DST): UTC+2 (CEST)
- Postal code: 03177
- Official language(s): Spanish
- Website: Official website

Daya Vieja (Spanish pronunciation: [ˈdaʝa ˈβjexa]) is a municipality of the Valencian Community (Spain), situated in the south-east of the Province of Alicante, in the comarca of Vega Baja del Segura.

== Geography ==
Daya Vieja is situated on the western side of the Segura river, one kilometre (0.6 miles) from San Fulgencio. It is connected to Guardamar del Segura, Dolores and Crevillente by a four-lane highway.

It has boundaries with Daya Nueva, Dolores, Formentera del Segura and San Fulgencio.

== History ==
The area dates back to the 18th century when the Pinohermoso family obtained the land. Until 1707, Daya had been incorporated in Orihuela 'county' and it did not fully lost ties to the city until 1833.

Together with Daya Nueva, it belonged to the Roca de Togores family and was split from Orihuela in 1791. This family sold local farming land in 1928 for 1,500,000 pesetas (€9,000) to the García Palmer and García Castillo brothers, who divided it before selling it on to smaller proprietors.

== Economy ==
The main economic activity in Daya Vieja is farming irrigated fields, using water from channels originating at Alfeitamí, the most frequently found crops are artichokes, hemp, potatoes and corn. Herds of sheep and pigs are also to be found.

== Monuments and places of interest ==
- Plaza del León

== Fiestas ==
- Patron Saints' Festivals: Celebrated on 8 September dedicated to Virgen de Monserrate.
