= Vega Baja del Segura =

Coordinates: 38°05′03″N 0°56′42″W

Vega Baja del Segura Baix Segura
- Comarca
- Country: Spain
- Autonomous community: Valencian Community
- Province: Alacant / Alicante
- Capital: Orihuela
- Municipalities: 27 municipalities: Torrevieja, Orihuela, Pilar de la Horadada, Almoradí, Callosa de Segura, Rojales, Guardamar del Segura, Albatera, San Fulgencio, Catral, San Miguel de Salinas, Redován, Dolores, Cox, Bigastro, Benejúzar, Rafal, Los Montesinos, Benijófar, Formentera del Segura, Algorfa, Granja de Rocamora, Jacarilla, Daya Nueva, Benferri, San Isidro, Daya Vieja

Area
  - Total: 957.3 km^{2} (369.6 sq mi)

Population (2019)
  - Total: 355,257
  - Density: 371.1/km^{2} (961.2/sq mi)
- Time zone: UTC+1 (CET)
  - Summer (DST): UTC+2 (CEST)
- Most populated municipality: Torrevieja

Vega Baja del Segura (Spanish: [ˈbeɣa ˈβaxa ðel seˈɣuɾa]; Valencian: Baix Segura [ˈbajʃ seˈɣuɾa]), simply known locally and regionally as Vega Baja (in Spanish), is a comarca in the province of Alicante, Valencian Community, Spain. The region is only Spanish-speaking, except Guardamar del Segura where Valencian is the traditional local language.

To the north its neighbouring comarcas are the Baix Vinalopó and Vinalopó Mitjà. Its southern limits are also those of the Valencian Community as it meets a different autonomous community, the Region of Murcia.

== Municipalities ==
The comarca is composed

Name	Area in km^{2}	Population (2001)	Population (2011)	Population (2019)
Albatera	66.5	8,633	11,690	12,279
Algorfa	18.4	1,710	3,312	2,935
Almoradí	42.7	14,050	19,280	20,803
Benejúzar	9.3	5,106	5,288	5,402
Benferri	12.4	1,166	1,881	1,942
Benijófar	4.4	2,297	3,355	3,322
Bigastro	4.1	5,155	6,737	6,733
Callosa de Segura	24.8	15,805	17,919	19,038
Catral	20.0	5,295	8,574	8,639
Coix	16.8	6,196	6,975	7,297
Daya Nueva	7.1	1,244	1,896	1,737
Daya Vieja	3.1	226	596	690
Dolores	18.7	6,267	7,303	7,470
Formentera del Segura	4.3	2,170	3,995	4,191
Granja de Rocamora	7.2	1,745	2,471	2,580
Guardamar del Segura	35.6	9,480	15,520	15,348
Jacarilla	12.2	1,644	2,008	2,022
Los Montesinos	15.1	2,774	4,852	4,968
Orihuela	365.4	54,390	79,889	77,414
Pilar de la Horadada	77.9	12,731	20,836	21,905
Rafal	1.6	3,414	4,203	4,498
Redován	9.4	5,860	7,562	7,869
Rojales	27.6	8,489	17,986	16,963
San Fulgencio	19.7	4,039	9,572	7,855
