= José Rico Pérez =

José Rico Pérez (13 March 1918 in Daya Nueva – 6 July 2010 in Alacant) was a Spanish businessman who was chairman of the Spanish football club Hércules CF from 1971 until 1985.

During Rico's tenure Hércules went through the most successful era in their history spending eight consecutive seasons in the Primera Liga between 1974 and 1982, which included a fifth placed finish during the 1974–75 season .

Rico was also instrumental in helping Alacant become one of the cities of the 1982 FIFA World Cup in Spain, and the stadium of the city is named after him.
