= Héctor Pizana =

Spanish footballer

Personal information
- Full name: Héctor Pizana Pascual
- Date of birth: 7 February 1995 (age 31)
- Place of birth: Los Montesinos, Spain
- Height: 1.85 m (6 ft 1 in)
- Position: Goalkeeper

Youth career
- Valencia

Senior career*
Years	Team	Apps	(Gls)
2013–2014	Valencia B	0	(0)
2014–2016	Albacete B	50	(0)
2015–2018	Albacete	2	(0)
2017–2018	→ Guijuelo (loan)	0	(0)
2018–2019	Navalcarnero	16	(0)
2019–2020	Xerez Deportivo	5	(0)
2020–2024	Atlético Pulpileño	109	(0)
- * Club domestic league appearances and goals as of 7 May 2024

Héctor Pizana Pascual (born 7 February 1995) is a Spanish footballer who plays as a goalkeeper.

== Club career ==
Born in Los Montesinos, Alicante, Valencian Community, Pizana finished his graduation with Valencia CF. On 18 July 2014 he moved to Albacete Balompié, being assigned to the reserves in Tercera División.

On 19 August 2015 Pizana signed a new three-year deal with Alba. On 9 September he made his first team debut, starting in a 1–2 away loss against UE Llagostera, for the season's Copa del Rey.

On 19 September 2015 Pizana made his Segunda División debut, starting and being sent off after committing a penalty in a 1–1 away draw against CD Mirandés. Ahead of the 2016–17 season, he was definitely promoted to the first team in Segunda División B.

On 4 August 2017, Pizana was loaned to CD Guijuelo in the third division, for one year. In October, he suffered a serious knee injury which kept him out for the remainder of the season, and terminated his contract with Alba on 27 July 2018.

On 29 July 2018, Pizana signed for CDA Navalcarnero in the third tier.
