= Aitor Gelardo =

Spanish footballer

Personal information
- Full name: Aitor Gelardo Vegara
- Date of birth: 26 June 2002 (age 24)
- Place of birth: Catral, Spain
- Height: 1.80 m (5 ft 11 in)
- Position: Midfielder

Team information
- Current team: Gimnàstic
- Number: 24

Youth career
- Villarreal
- 2018–2019: Roda
- 2019–2020: Villarreal

Senior career*
Years	Team	Apps	(Gls)
2018	Roda	1	(0)
2020–2021	Villarreal C	26	(1)
2021–2024	Villarreal B	38	(0)
2022–2023	→ Linares (loan)	31	(1)
2024–2026	Racing Ferrol	39	(2)
2026–	Gimnàstic	15	(0)

International career
2018–2019	Spain U17	19	(0)
2019	Spain U18	5	(0)
- * Club domestic league appearances and goals as of 10 June 2026

Aitor Gelardo Vegara (born 26 June 2002) is a Spanish footballer who plays as a central midfielder for Gimnàstic de Tarragona.

== Club career ==
Born in Catral, Alicante, Valencian Community, Gelardo was a Villarreal CF youth graduate. He made his senior debut with affiliate club CD Roda on 15 December 2018, starting in a 2–1 Tercera División home win over CD Acero.

In 2020, after finishing his formation, Gelardo was assigned to Villarreal's C-team also in the fourth division, being a regular starter during the season. On 17 June 2021, Gelardo renewed his contract with the Yellow Submarine until 2024, and was subsequently promoted to the reserves in Primera División RFEF.

A fourth-choice behind Alberto del Moral, Carlo Adriano and Antonio Pacheco, Gelardo contributed with 11 appearances during the season as the B-team achieved promotion to Segunda División. On 31 August 2022, he moved to third division side Linares Deportivo on loan for one year.

Upon returning, Gelardo was assigned back at the B-side, and made his professional debut on 12 August 2023, coming on as a late substitute for Hugo Pérez in a 2–0 away loss to Real Zaragoza. On 1 August of the following year, after suffering relegation with the B's, he moved to Racing de Ferrol also in the second division.

Gelardo scored his first professional goal on 24 October 2024, netting the equalizer in a 1–1 away draw against Burgos CF. He scored one further time during the campaign, also dropping down a level.

On 13 January 2026, after becoming mainly a backup option, Gelardo terminated his link with Racing, and signed an 18-month deal with fellow third division side Gimnàstic de Tarragona just hours later.
