= Estadio José Rico Pérez =

Multipurpose stadium in Alicante, Spain

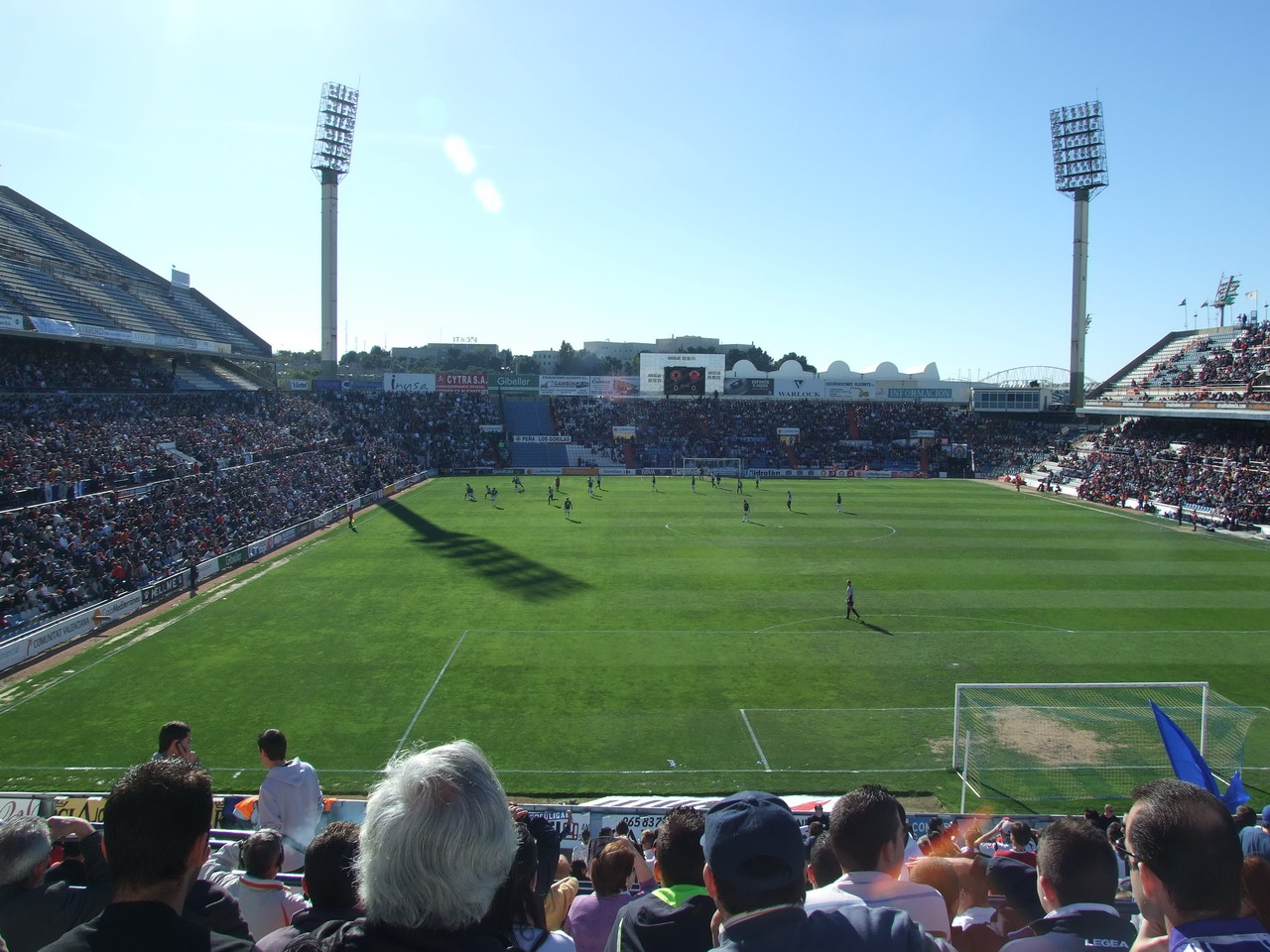
- Interactive map of Estadio José Rico Pérez
- Location: Alicante, Spain
- Coordinates: 38°21′26″N 0°29′33″W
- Owner: Hércules CF
- Operator: Hércules CF
- Capacity: 24,704
- Field size: 105 metres (115 yd) x 68 metres (74 yd)

Construction
- Opened: 1974
- Architect: Francisco Llorens

Tenants
- Hércules CF (1974–present); Alicante CF (2001–2010); Spain national football team (selected matches)

Estadio José Rico Pérez is a multi-purpose stadium in Alicante, Spain. It is currently used mostly for football matches, being home to Hércules CF. It also hosted World Cup matches when Spain organized the event in 1982. With a capacity of 24,704 seats, it is the 25th-largest stadium in Spain and the 4th-largest in the Valencian Community. It was built in 1974, and is situated 2 miles outside Alicante city centre. The stadium is named after the former chairman of Hércules CF, José Rico Pérez (1918–2010).

== Gallery ==
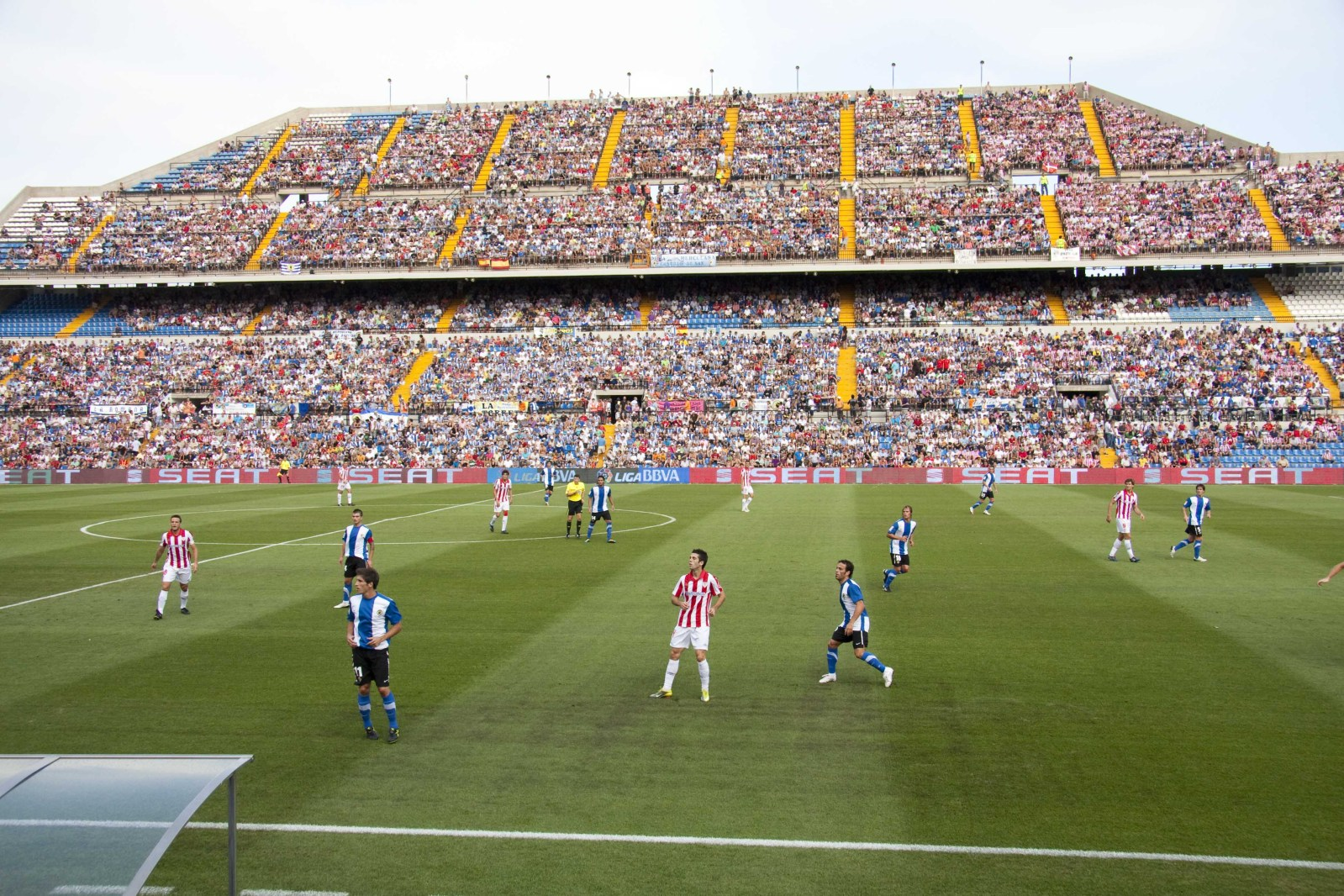
Estadio José Rico Pérez, 2010

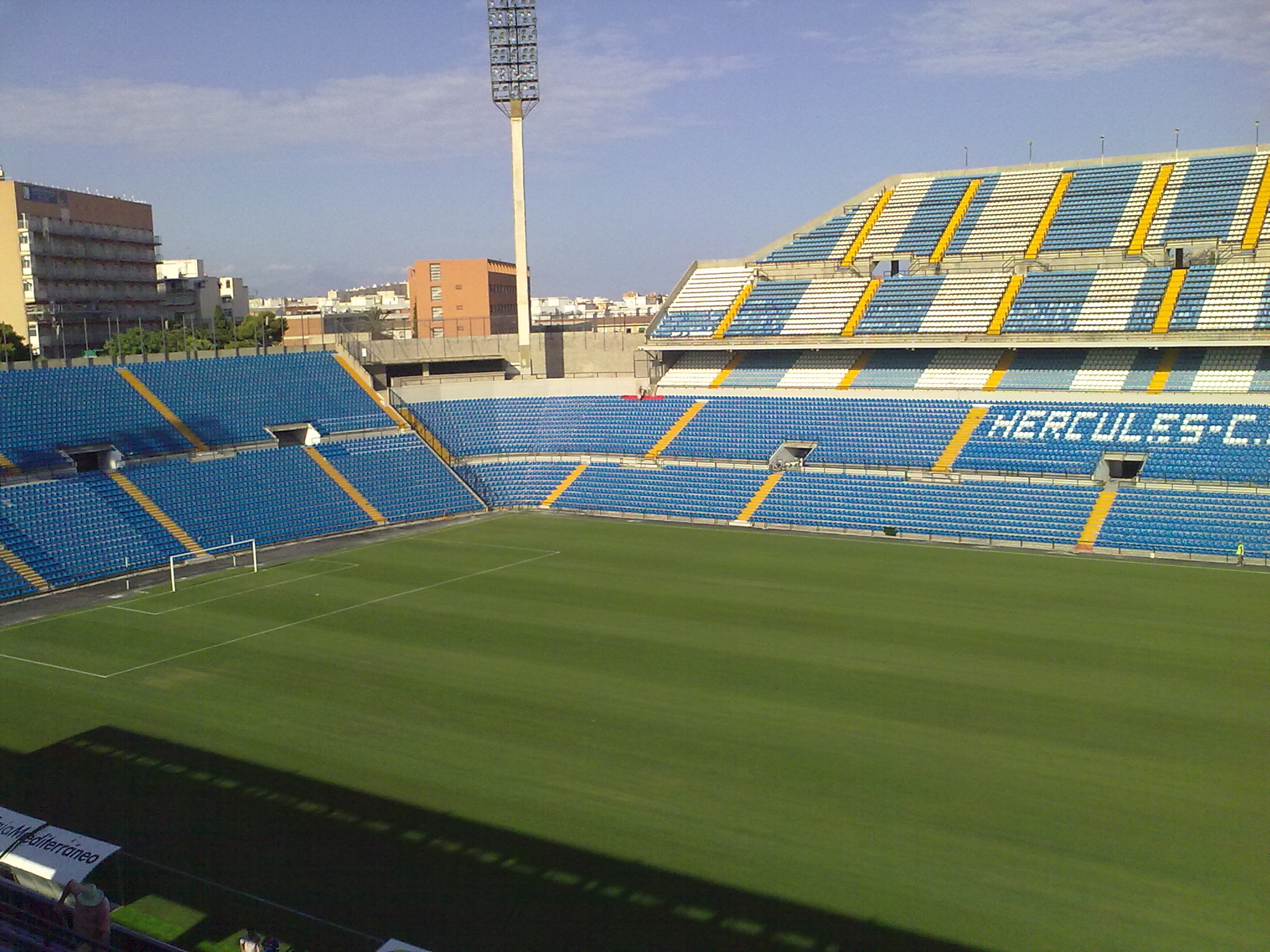
Estadio José Rico Pérez, 2010

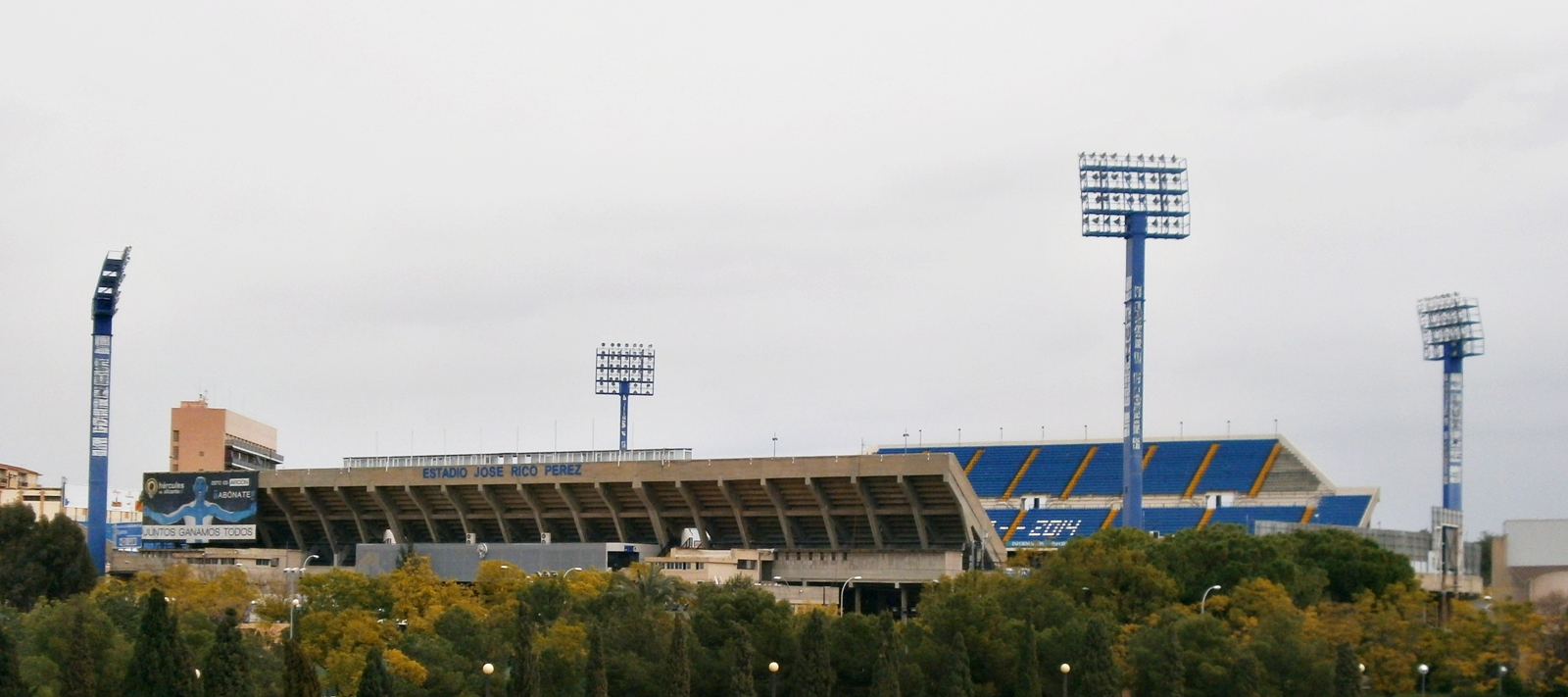
External view of the stadium

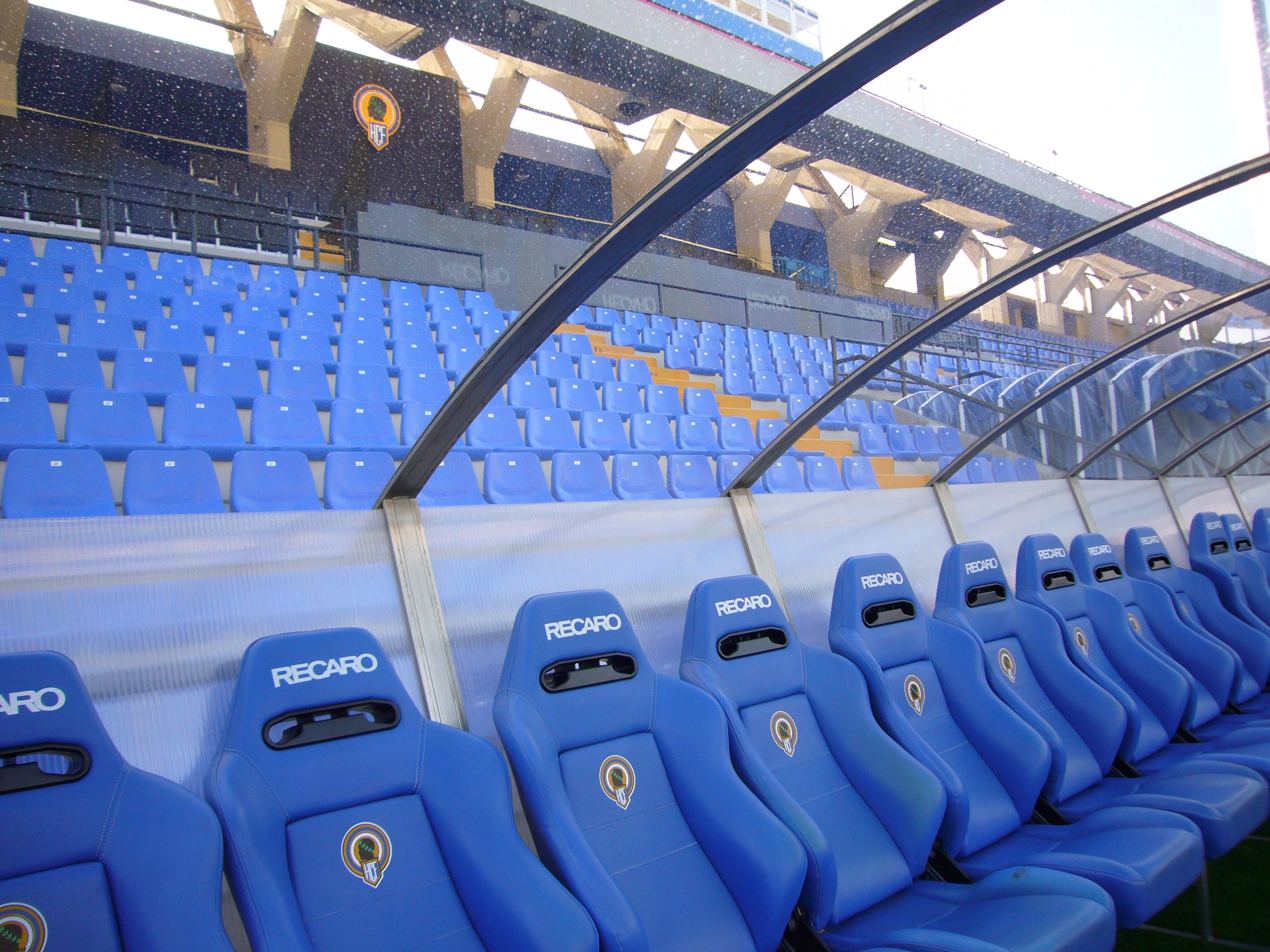
players bench

== 1982 FIFA World Cup ==
The stadium was one of the venues of the 1982 FIFA World Cup, and held the following matches:

Date	Team #1	Res.	Team #2	Round	Attendance
1982-06-18	Argentina	4–1	Hungary	Group 3 (first round)	32,093
1982-06-23	Argentina	2–0	El Salvador	Group 3 (first round)	32,093
1982-07-10	Poland	3–2	France	Third place match	32,500
