= Rafal, Spain =

Coordinates: 38°06′N 0°50′W

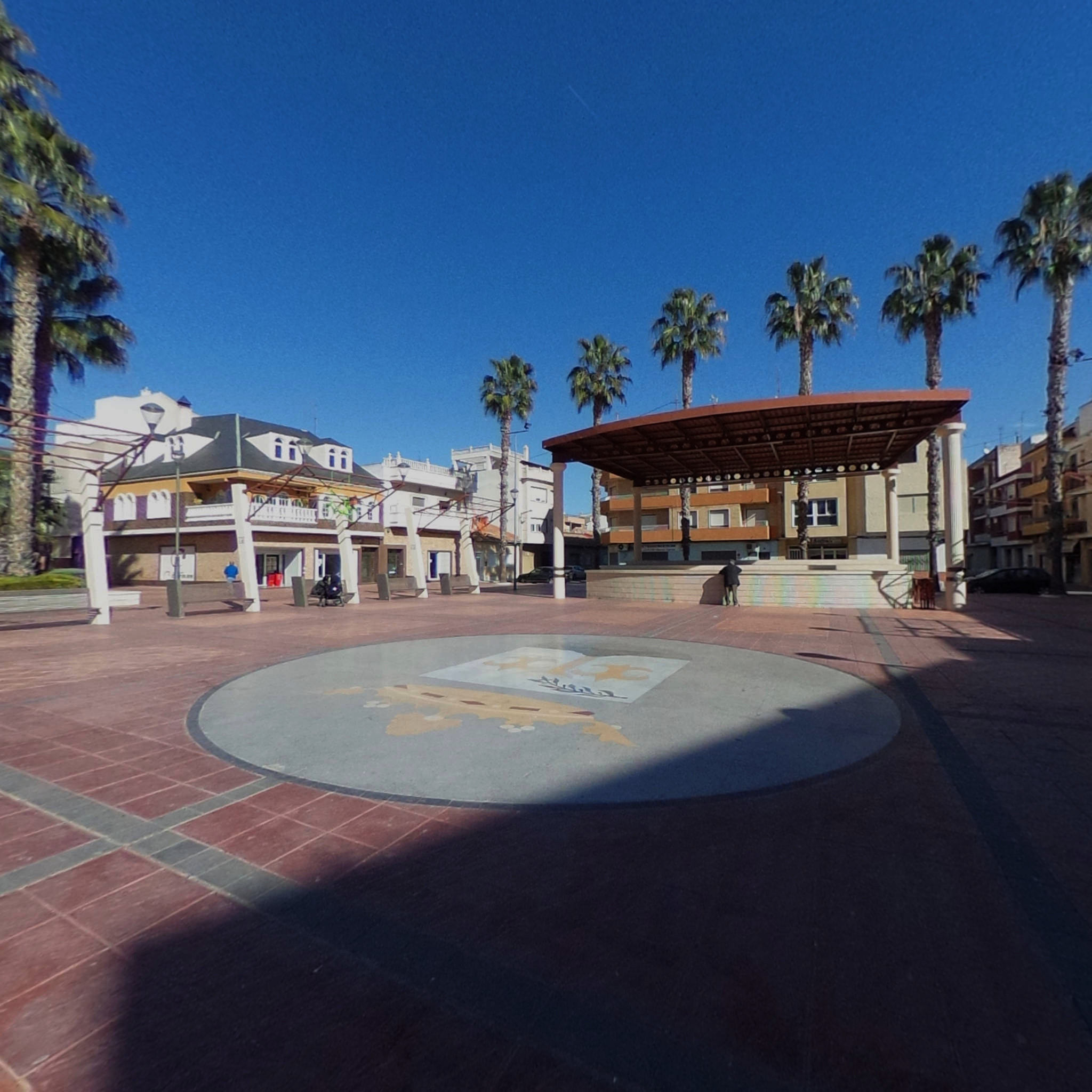
Music band in the main square of Rafal

Rafal's coat of arms

Rafal is a municipality in the Valencian Community (Spain) situated in the south of the province of Alicante, in the comarca of Vega Baja del Segura. The municipality covers an area of 1.6 square kilometres (0.62 sq mi) and as of 2011 had a population of 4,162 people.
