= Algorfa =

Algorfa (Alicante) Spain
- Municipality
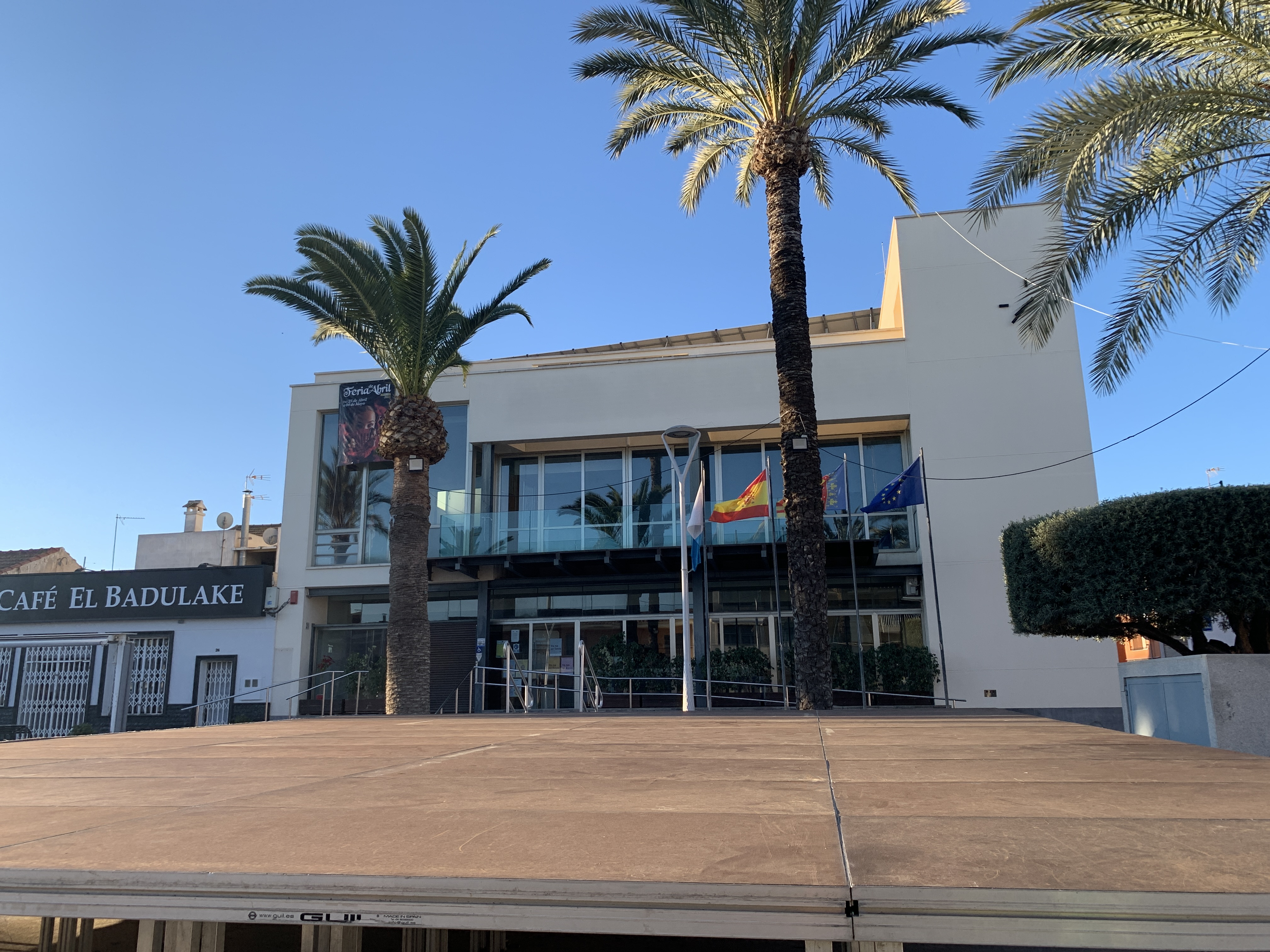
- Town hall

- Flag Coat of arms

- Location in Spain
- Coordinates: 38°5′9″N 0°48′17″W
- Country: Spain
- Autonomous community: Valencian Community
- Province: Alicante
- Comarca: Vega Baja del Segura
- Judicial district: Orihuela

Government
  - Alcalde: Ivan Manuel Ros Rodes (2015) (PSPV-PSOE)

Area
  - Total: 18.36 km^{2} (7.09 sq mi)
- Elevation: 26 m (85 ft)

Population (2025-01-01)
  - Total: 3,788
  - Density: 206.3/km^{2} (534.4/sq mi)
- Demonym: Algorfeño/a
- Time zone: UTC+1 (CET)
  - Summer (DST): UTC+2 (CEST)
- Postal code: 03169
- Official language(s): Spanish
- Website: Official website

Algorfa (Spanish pronunciation: [alˈɣoɾfa]) is a village in the Costa Blanca area of Spain, near the coast and surrounded by Mediterranean pine forest and citrus groves.

Algorfa lies on the banks of the Segura river and is approximately ten minutes' drive to the nearest blue flag beaches of the Mediterranean and a 35 minutes' drive from the Alicante Airport and the Murcia–San Javier Airport. It is a ten minute drive inland from the coastal resort of Guardamar del Segura.

As one of Vega Baja del Segura’s citrus farming villages, with a population of nearly 3,000, Algorfa is situated within a fertile countryside.

Just outside the village is an unusual neo-Gothic church that was built at the beginning of the nineteenth century. Algorfa holds a market on Wednesdays.

It is also home to the La Finca Golf Club and to three urbanizations: Lo Crispín, Castillo de Montemar and Montebello, each constituted by villas and apartments.
