= Redován =

- Municipality
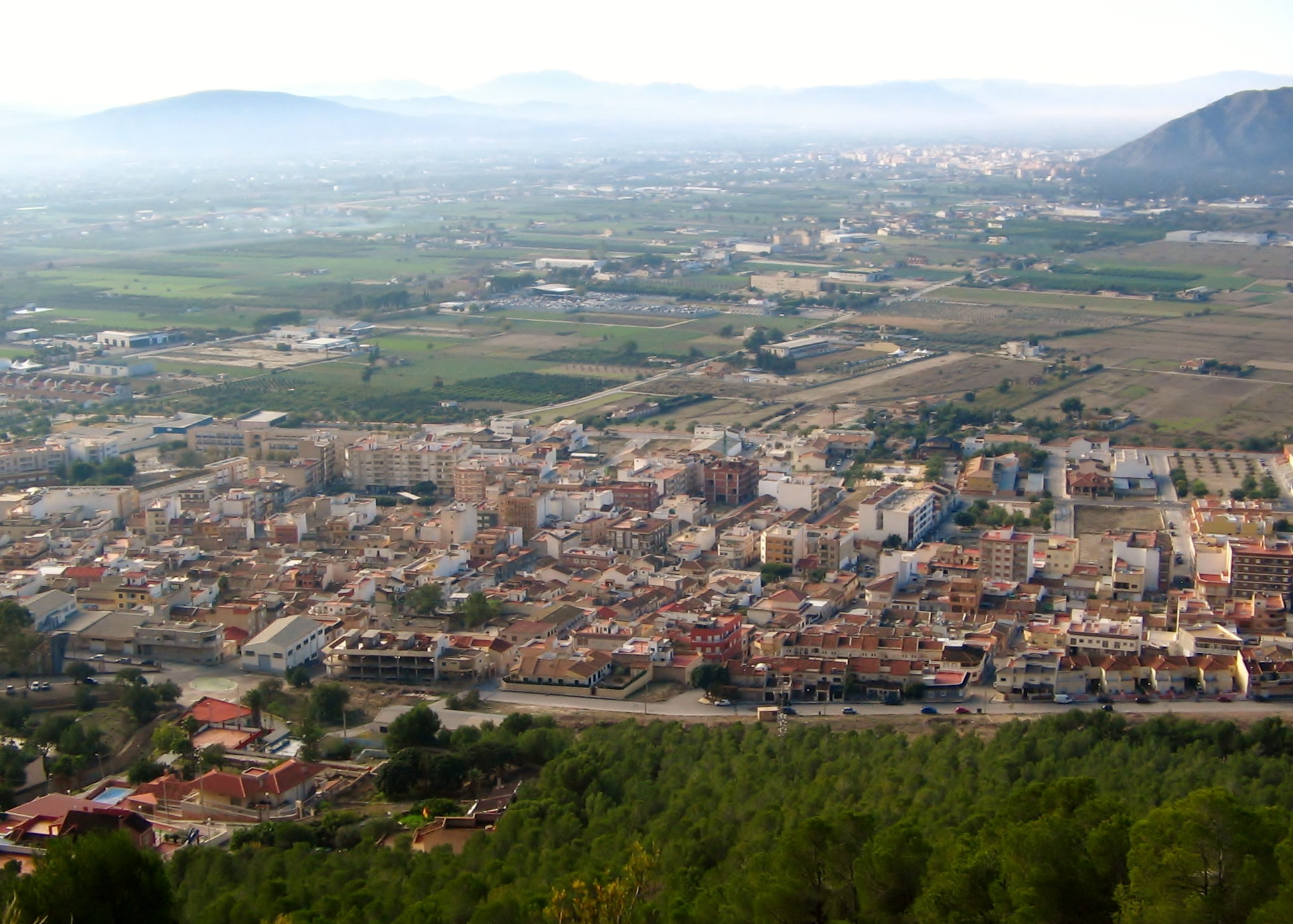

- Coat of arms

- Location in Spain
- Coordinates: 38°6′50″N 0°54′20″W
- Country: Spain
- Autonomous community: Valencian Community
- Province: Alicante
- Comarca: Vega Baja del Segura
- Judicial district: Orihuela

Government
  - Alcalde: Emilio Ferandez Escudero (2011) (PP)

Area
  - Total: 9.4 km^{2} (3.6 sq mi)
- Elevation: 18 m (59 ft)

Population (2025-01-01)
  - Total: 8,283
  - Density: 880/km^{2} (2,300/sq mi)
- Demonym: Redovanense
- Time zone: UTC+1 (CET)
  - Summer (DST): UTC+2 (CEST)
- Postal code: 03370
- Official language(s): Spanish
- Website: http://ayuntamientoredovan.com/

Redován is a municipality in the comarca of Vega Baja del Segura in the Valencian Community, Spain.

This town is located at the feet of the Sierra de Callosa mountain range. Redovan is one of the Vega Baja (low fertile valley) villages of the southern Costa Blanca, Spain. Located in the Alicante province, on a sparsely vegetated plain at the foot of the Sierra Segura, approximately 7 km from Orihuela.

Although the town was founded by the Moors during the Arab conquest (8th - 13th Centuries, there is evidence of much earlier settlements going back to pre-historic times. The town is well known for its ceramics and this tradition stretches back to the 3rd century BC from when various samples of ceramic work have been found with a very distinctive zig-zag pattern.

There appear to have been settlements on some small elevations of land in the surrounding areas from the Neolithic Period up until Bronze Age. In the 2nd century BC there appears to have been several different cultures in the region, among them “the culture of Argar” more commonly found in Almeria (further south down the coast of Spain). The area has always attracted settlers mostly because of its importance in agriculture due largely to the basin being irrigated by the Segura river, though there have often problems as the area is prone to flooding.

Redovan's early history is dominated by the Arabs (Moors) and there is little doubt that the name of the village is derived from the Arabic language, despite there being some confusion as to the actual origin of the name. Some say that name derives from a famous general of the Moorish King of Granada named Farax Ben Redvan (or Reduan) who invaded and plundered the village in 1331. Others refer to the “Book of Distributions” in Orihuela which mentions the name “Aben-Redvan” (“of the children of Reduan”) relating to a time much earlier than 1331.

A 16th-century historian attributes the name to the family of Redouanes (of Moroccan origin) who were Moorish noblemen from Granada.Redovan and the whole area suffered a great pestilence in 1347 and this lasted until 1351 this ravaged the agriculture of the area and many of its residents re-settled in the city of Orihuela. During this time the town was often plundered by bandits and renegades. The plague hit again in 1374 and in 1383.

Redovan and its people were also greatly affected by the constant wars between the Kingdoms of Valencia and Aragon. During the 17th Century Redovan enjoyed a period of improved wealth and prosperity due to successes in agriculture, important crops at the time being grapes, vegetables, wheat, olives and the mulberry (silk became an important product of the town. Redovan was seriously damaged by the disastrous earthquake of 1829 and there a great loss of life. In 1847 Redovan had 160 houses and 1,591 inhabitants, its industry consisted of “5 mills and some looms”.

Modern day Redovan is a busy town of around 5,600 people, it is noted for the production of cotton, hemp and hemp products, espadrilles and the formerly mentioned ceramics. During the latter part of September there is an exhibition of hemp products in the town dedicated to the patron saint of the village, St Michael. It's also a popular location for potholers as there are many caves in the area suitable for this more modern pursuit. Redovan has numerous bars, restaurants and shops, centred on its village square where many celebrations, fiestas and festivities take place.

Redovan is readily accessible via the N-340 and the A-7 motorway, it is approximately 52 km from Alicante and its international airport at El Altet (Alicante).
