= Torreta de Guardamar =

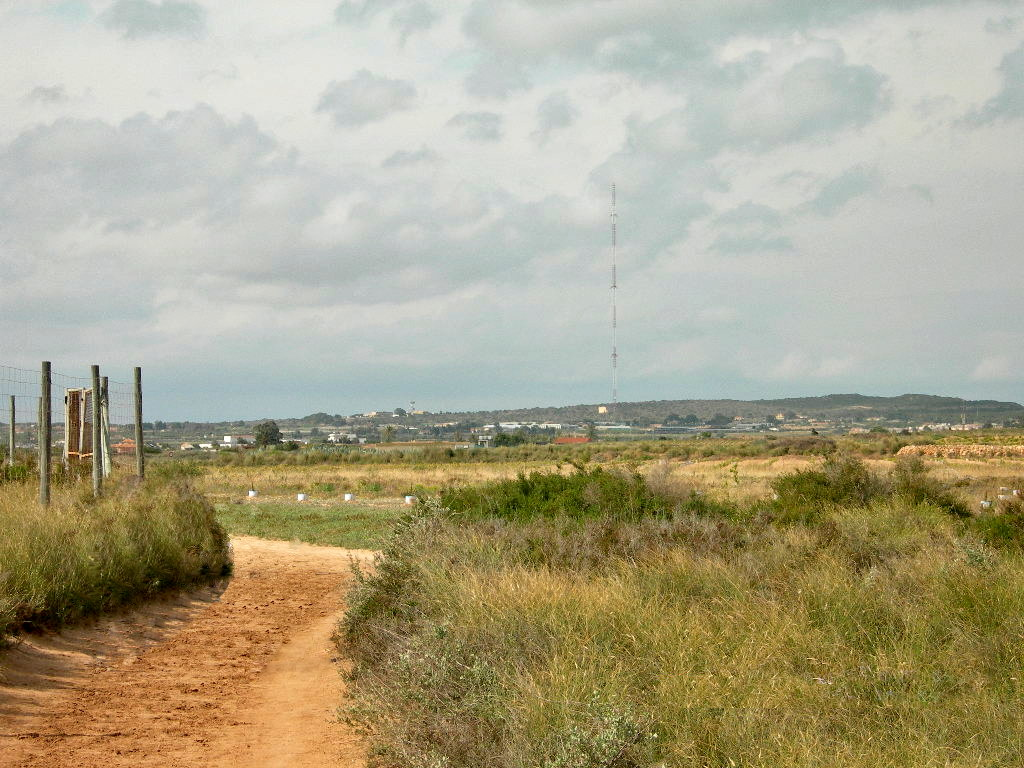
- Interactive map of the Torreta de Guardamar area

General information
- Status: Completed
- Type: Mast radiator insulated against ground
- Location: Guardamar, Spain
- Coordinates: 38°4′18″N 0°39′52″W
- Completed: 1962

Height
- Height: 380 m (1,246.72 ft)

Design and construction
- Main contractor: Spanish Navy

Torreta de Guardamar (Valencian: [toˈreta ðe ˌɣwaɾðaˈmaɾ], Spanish: [toˈreta ðe ˌɣwaɾðaˈmaɾ]) or Torre de los Americanos is a 380-metre (1,247 ft) tall (Note: 380 metres is the number stated in the sign at the entrance erected by the Spanish Navy, and is also cited in an article by a local newspaper albeit with contradicitons, but the Spanish civil aviation authority, in its description as an obstacle for aviation with the designation '15-7591 D15-094-FFSS 01', refers a height of 365.76 metres (1,200 ft). On the other hand, the newspaper 'El País' states in an article that the height is 365 metres (1,198 ft), while other media outlets claim it to be 370 metres (1,214 ft).) guyed radio mast erected by the US Navy near Guardamar del Segura, Spain. It was built in 1962 and is the tallest architectural structure in both the Iberian Peninsula and the European Union, and the tallest military structure in Europe. Its base is situated 64 metres (210 ft) above sea level at a distance of 1.4 km (0.9 mi) from the sea.

== Details ==
Torreta de Guardamar is a mast radiator insulated from earth, and is used to transmit orders to submerged submarines. It is a lattice structure with triangular cross section. In spite of its enormous height, it is short in relation to the wavelength of the waves it transmits. Its capacity is augmented by multiple cables connected to its top and running to anchors around the mast. These cables are electrically connected to the mast and are divided at a certain distance by insulators.

The transmitter using Torreta de Guardamar as antenna had been, since its inauguration, remotely controlled by the US Naval Communication Station in Rota. Then it was transferred to the Spanish Navy, and is used for transmitting orders to submerged submarines stationed in Cartagena during their operations. As opposed to other VLF transmitters such as the DHO38 in Rhauderfehn, it has no fixed frequency allocation by ITU and carries no callsign.

This installation is currently guarded by Spanish Marine Infantry, and is marked as "Radio Estación Naval - Antena LF 380 metros - Guardamar", with the facilities being listed officially as "Estación Radio de Guardamar del Segura".

== Notes ==
Records
Preceded by Belmont transmitting station 351.7 m (1,154 ft)	Tallest structure in EU; 2010 – present 370 m (1,210 ft)	Incumbent
