= Benferri =

- Municipality
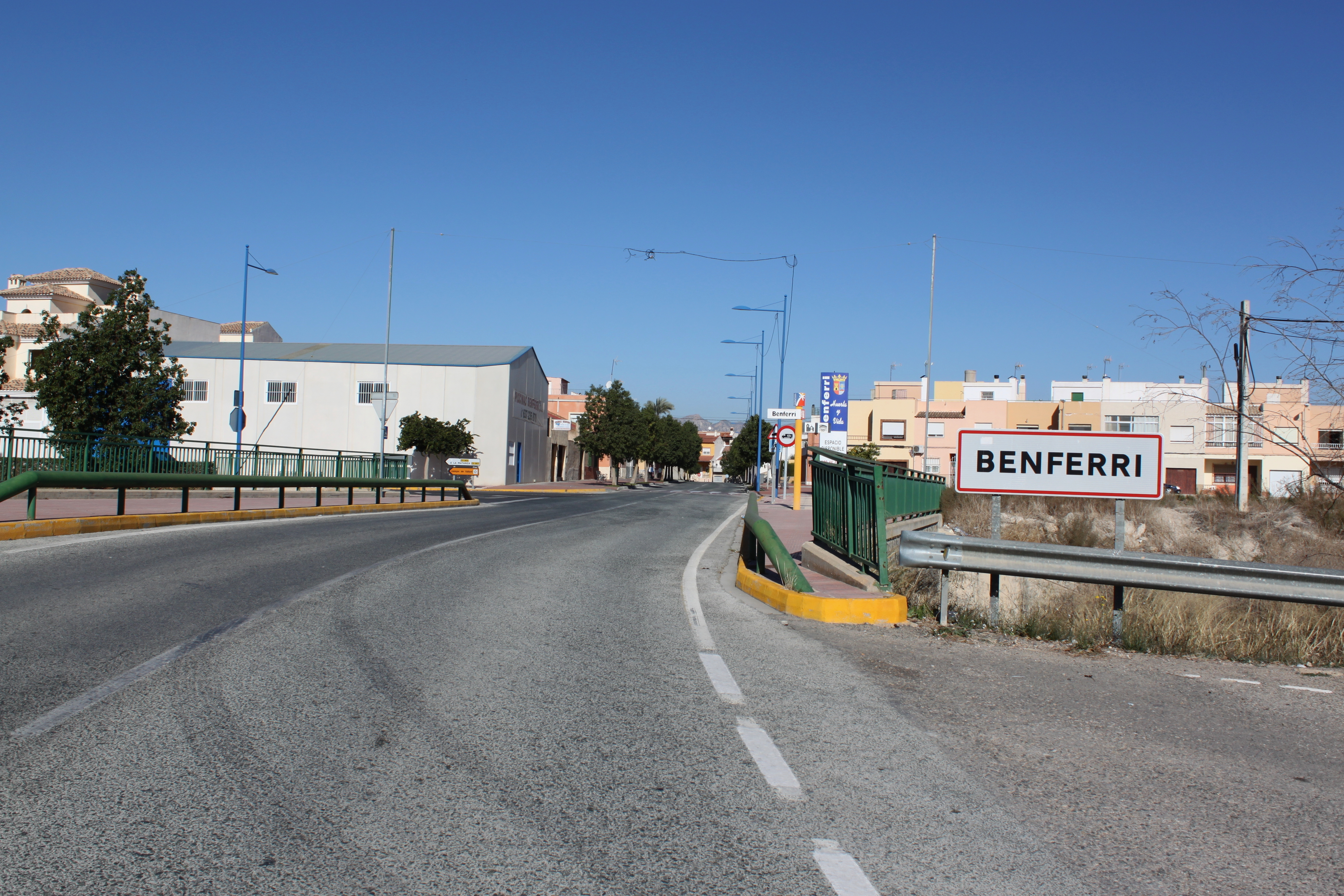
- The access sign of Benferri

- Flag Coat of arms

- Location in Spain
- Coordinates: 38°8′30″N 0°57′45″W
- Country: Spain
- Autonomous community: Valencian Community
- Province: Alicante
- Comarca: Vega Baja del Segura
- Judicial district: Orihuela

Government
  - Alcalde: Luis Vicente Mateo (2007) (PSPV-PSOE)

Area
  - Total: 12.40 km^{2} (4.79 sq mi)
- Elevation: 52 m (171 ft)

Population (2025-01-01)
  - Total: 2,099
  - Density: 169.3/km^{2} (438.4/sq mi)
- Demonym(s): Benferrejo, -a
- Time zone: UTC+1 (CET)
  - Summer (DST): UTC+2 (CEST)
- Postal code: 03316
- Official language(s): Spanish

Benferri (Spanish pronunciation: [beɱˈferi]) is a municipality in the comarca of Vega Baja del Segura in the Valencian Community, Spain.

This town is located 2.5 km (2 mi) to the north of the Sierra de Orihuela mountain range.
