= Francisco Rufete =

Spanish former footballer, and a manager (born 1976)

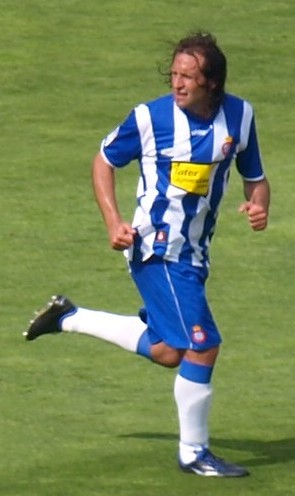
- Rufete playing for Espanyol in 2009

Personal information
- Full name: Francisco Joaquín Pérez Rufete
- Date of birth: 20 November 1976 (age 49)
- Place of birth: Benejúzar, Spain
- Height: 1.77 m (5 ft 10 in)
- Position: Winger

Youth career
- Atlético Benejúzar
- 1992–1995: Barcelona

Senior career*
Years	Team	Apps	(Gls)
1995	Barcelona C	12	(3)
1995–1997	Barcelona B	45	(0)
1996	Barcelona	1	(0)
1997–1998	Toledo	38	(5)
1998–1999	Mallorca	0	(0)
1999	→ Málaga (loan)	20	(5)
1999–2001	Málaga	65	(9)
2001–2006	Valencia	132	(13)
2006–2009	Espanyol	57	(1)
2009–2011	Hércules	46	(0)
Total		416	(36)

International career
1992–1993	Spain U16	19	(0)
1994–1995	Spain U18	9	(0)
2000	Spain	3	(0)

Managerial career
- 2018: Ibiza
- 2020: Espanyol (interim)
- * Club domestic league appearances and goals

Francisco Joaquín Pérez Rufete (born 20 November 1976) is a Spanish former professional footballer who played predominantly as a right winger.

He appeared for seven clubs during his career, including Barcelona (one game) and Valencia (two La Liga titles). Over 12 seasons, he amassed Spanish top-division totals of 269 matches and 23 goals.

Rufete was also an international for Spain. After retiring, he worked briefly as a manager.

== Club career ==
Born in Benejúzar, Province of Alicante, Valencian Community, Rufete was a product of Barcelona's youth system. He appeared once for the first team, in 1995–96's final round, a 2–2 away draw against Deportivo de La Coruña on 26 May 1996, and his first full professional season came in 1997–98 with Segunda División club Toledo.

Rufete signed for Málaga in January 1999, after having started the campaign with Mallorca (no appearances). He was instrumental, alongside Catanha and José María Movilla, in the side's promotion to La Liga (they were in the Segunda División B the previous season).

After two exceptional individual seasons, Rufete moved to Valencia. Although almost never an undisputed starter, he contributed good overall performances and, on 14 March 2004, scored twice at Celta (2–0) as the Che went on to win another domestic championship; he was already part of the title-winning squad of 2001–02.

After Quique Sánchez Flores arrived at Valencia from Getafe, Rufete was released and joined Espanyol on a free transfer in July 2006. He was constantly hampered by injuries in the 2007–08 campaign, after having appeared in eleven UEFA Cup matches during the Catalans' run to the final in 2007.

Rufete was released by Espanyol in mid-July 2009, moving close to home with Hércules on a two-year deal. In his first season, aged 32/33, the veteran totalled nearly 2,000 minutes as the Alicante team returned to the top division after an absence of 13 years.

== International career ==
Rufete earned three caps for the Spain national team in 2000, the first being in a 2–0 friendly win over Italy on 29 March in Barcelona. He came on as a substitute for Joseba Etxeberria at the hour-mark.

== Managerial career ==
Rufete was released by Hércules in late 2011 after the club decided not to renew his contract, and retired from football shortly after. Two years later, he returned to Valencia after being appointed youth coordinator, but switched to director of football after a few months.

On 18 April 2018, Rufete was given his first managerial position at Ibiza of Tercera División. His team missed out on promotion with a penalty shootout defeat to Atlético Levante in the play-off final on 24 June.

Rufete returned to Espanyol as sporting director, and became their interim manager on 27 June 2020 when Abelardo Fernández was sacked from the last-placed club with six games to go. The next day, in his first professional game in charge, his side lost by a single goal at home to Real Madrid; he oversaw their first fall from the top flight since 1993.

== Personal life ==
Rufete's son, also named Franciso, was also a professional footballer. He also represented Valencia.

== Managerial statistics ==
As of 19 July 2020

Managerial record by team and tenure
Team	Nat	From	To	Record								Ref
Team	Nat	From	To	G	W	D	L	GF	GA	GD	Win %	Ref
Ibiza	(Spain)	18 April 2018	6 July 2018	10	7	2	1	11	4	+7	70.00	
Espanyol (interim)	(Spain)	27 June 2020	20 July 2020	7	0	1	6	1	8	−7	0.00	
Total				17	7	3	7	12	12	+0	41.18	—

== Honours ==
Málaga

- Segunda División: 1998–99

Valencia

- La Liga: 2001–02, 2003–04
- UEFA Cup: 2003–04
- UEFA Super Cup: 2004

Espanyol

- UEFA Cup runner-up: 2006–07

Spain U18

- UEFA European Under-18 Championship: 1995
