= Benijófar =

- Municipality
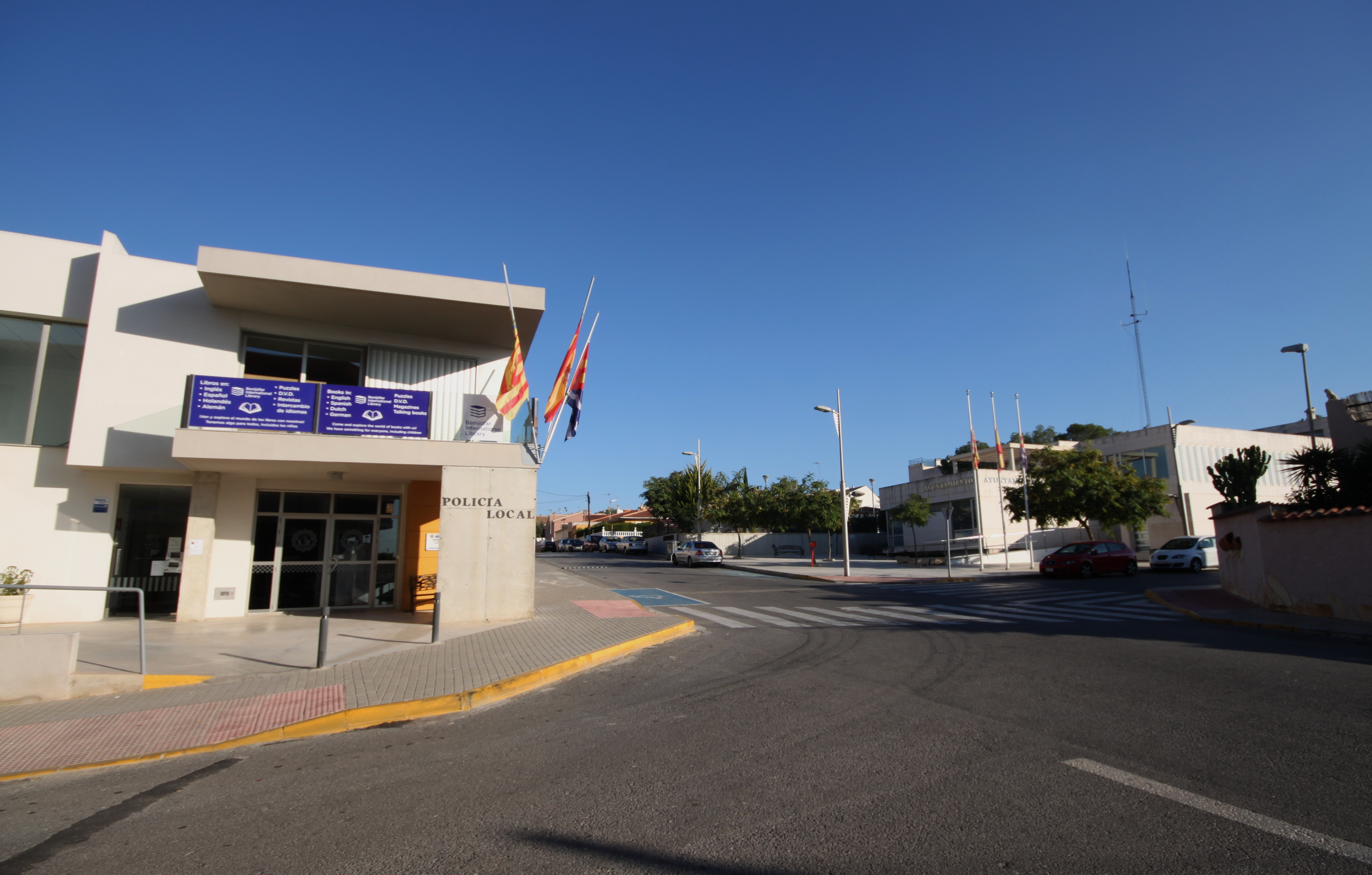
- The Town Hall of Benijófar

- Flag Coat of arms

- Location in Spain
- Coordinates: 38°04′50″N 0°44′19″W
- Country: Spain
- Autonomous community: Valencian Community
- Province: Alicante
- Comarca: Vega Baja del Segura
- Judicial district: Torrevieja

Government
  - Alcalde: Daniel Padilla Villa(2007) (PSPV-PSOE)

Area
  - Total: 4.40 km^{2} (1.70 sq mi)
- Elevation: 18 m (59 ft)

Population (2025-01-01)
  - Total: 3,679
  - Density: 836/km^{2} (2,170/sq mi)
- Demonym(s): Benijofero, -a
- Time zone: UTC+1 (CET)
  - Summer (DST): UTC+2 (CEST)
- Postal code: 03178
- Official language(s): Spanish
- Website: www.benijofar.org

Benijófar (Spanish pronunciation: [beniˈxofaɾ]) is a municipality in the comarca of Vega Baja del Segura in the Valencian Community, Spain.
