= Dolores, Spain =

Dolores
- Municipality
- Coat of arms

- Location of Dolores in Comunidad Valenciana

- Location in Spain
- Coordinates: 38°8′20″N 0°46′12″W
- Country: Spain
- Autonomous community: Valencian Community
- Province: Alicante
- Comarca: Vega Baja del Segura
- Judicial district: Orihuela

Government
  - Alcalde: Gabriel Gascón Abadia (2007) (PP)

Area
  - Total: 18.25 km^{2} (7.05 sq mi)
- Elevation: 4 m (13 ft)

Population (2025-01-01)
  - Total: 8,326
  - Density: 456.2/km^{2} (1,182/sq mi)
- Demonym: Dolorenses
- Time zone: UTC+1 (CET)
  - Summer (DST): UTC+2 (CEST)
- Postal code: 03150
- Official language(s): Spanish
- Website: Official website

Dolores (Spanish pronunciation: [doˈloɾes]) is a town located in the comarca of Vega Baja del Segura in southern Alicante province, Spain. The town is in the heart of the Segura huerta (vegetable garden) about 10 km (6.2 mi) from the nearest beaches in La Marina and Guardamar. Dolores is readily accessible from the Autovia del Mediterráneo motorway and a new motorway from Elche, and is about 20 minutes away from the Alicante international airport. The town has a population of 7427, an area of 18.25 km^{2} (7.05 sq mi), and the average monthly temperature varies between 16 °C (61 °F) in December–January and 28 °C (82 °F) in July–August.

The most important monument is the 18th-century church, with sculptures by Salcillo and Roque Lopez. The two most important fiestas in Dolores are the Feria de Agosto (August Fair) in early August; and the Fiesta de la Virgen, in mid-September. The Feria de Agosto is one of the more important fairs of Spain, and it features a Spanish Horse Contest. More than 1,500 horses are shown each year in all sorts of games and activities. Cattle and dog contests are also held at the fair. The Fiesta de la Virgen includes a carriage parade, the running of the "vaca toposa" (a variety of a small, aggressive cow), and the procession to honor the Virgen de los Dolores (Virgin of Sorrows), the patron saint of the village.

The typical cuisine of Dolores takes advantage of the fresh vegetables available in the area (artichokes, beans), and also includes plenty of meat and seafood. The most typical dish is "cocido con pelotas", which includes meatballs and potato and chickpea stew. There are also many fresh fruits such as melons, watermelons, oranges, and apricots. An open-air market is held every Friday morning where the local produce is sold.

Housing in Dolores is relatively affordable, and substantially cheaper than in the nearby beach areas. On November 25, 2005, the Municipal government of Dolores approved the development of a 1.6 km^{2} area -Dolores Golf- to accommodate 2,664 new housing units, which also includes a 580,000 m^{2} (145 acre) golf course. The new development was modified afterwards, and is now fully consistent with the regional government (Generalitat Valenciana) requirements. The improved Dolores Golf plan was approved on March 26, 2007, with the agreement of the two main political forces in Dolores -People's Party (P.P.) and the Socialist Party (P.S.O.E)- which, together, accounted for some 92 percent of the votes in the May 2007 local elections. . The revised plan was finally approved by the Conselleria de Urbanismo (regional government) on March 27, 2008. . The development is expected to be completed over the next few years.

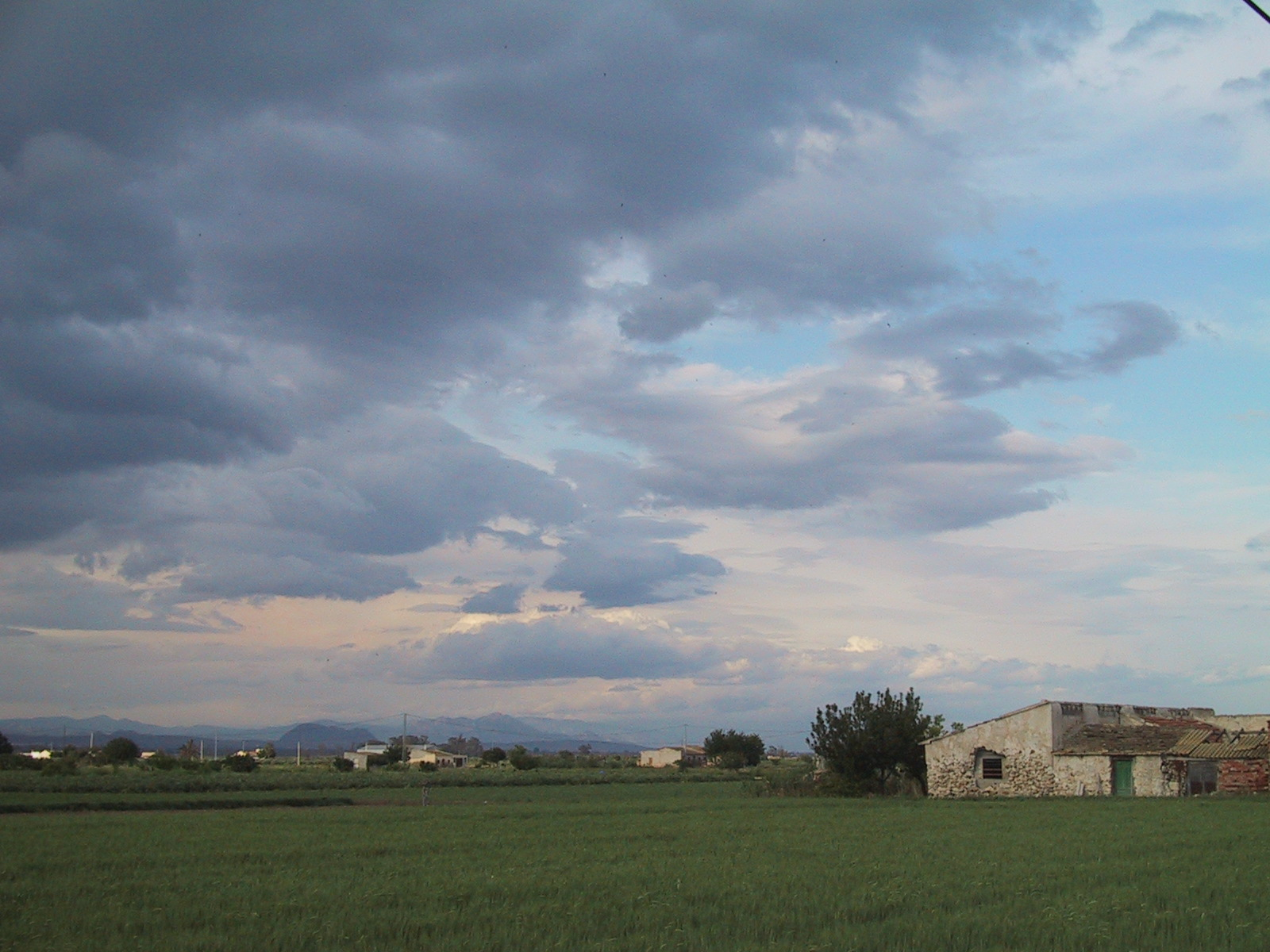
Dolores countryside

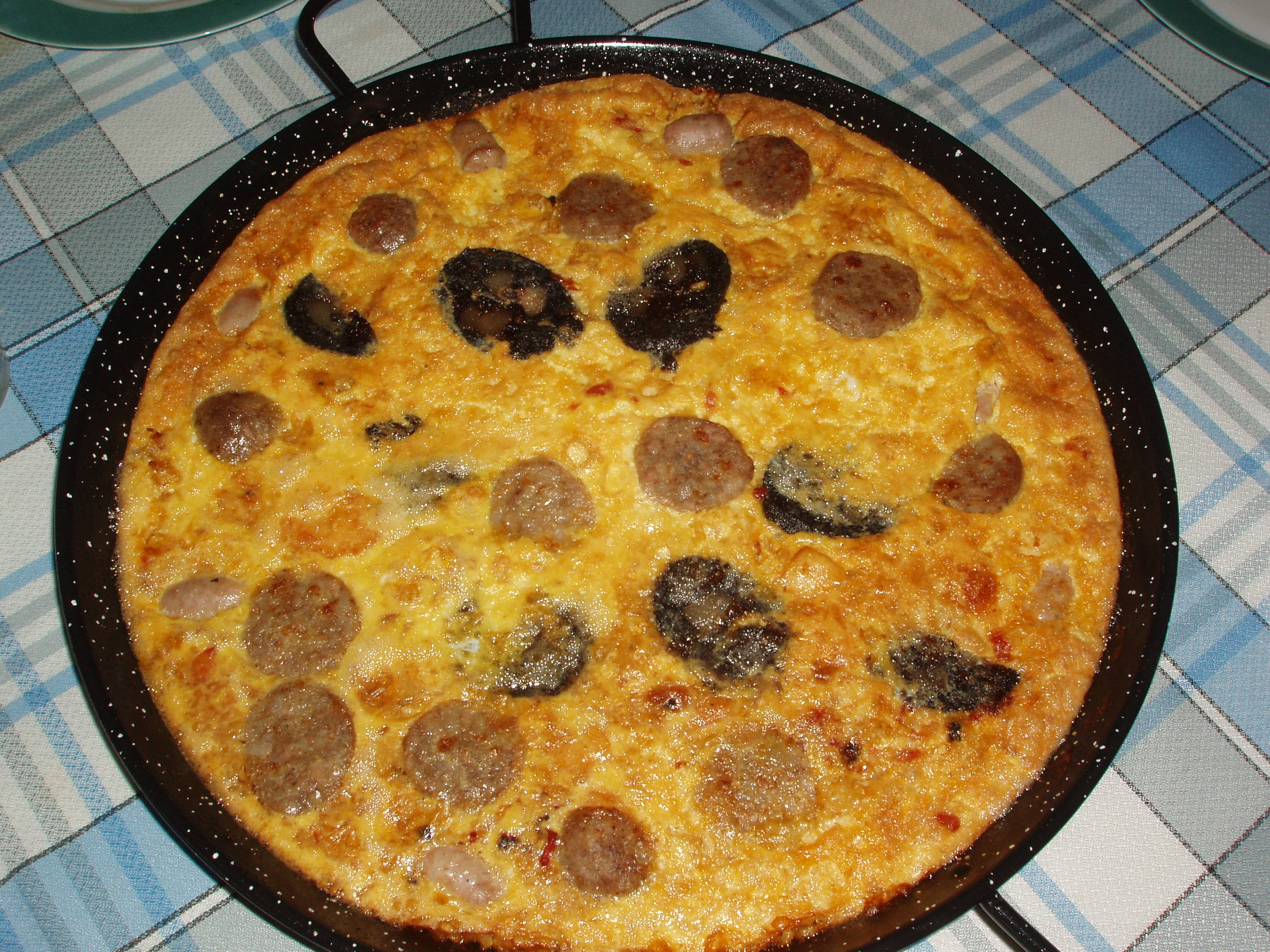
Arroz con costra (Rice with crust), typical food of Dolores

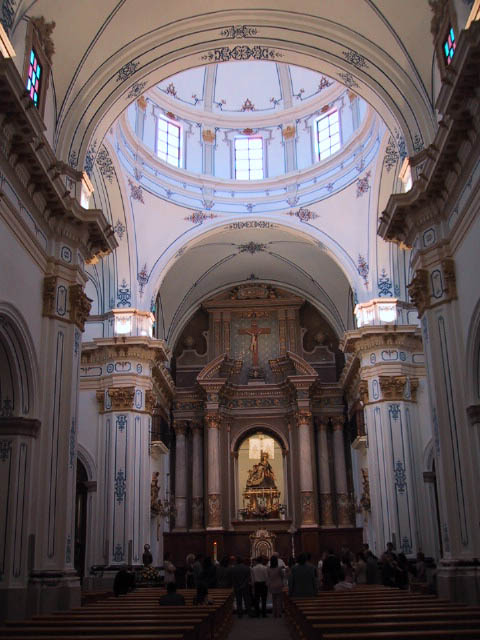
Interior of the church "Virgen de los Dolores"
