= 1727 in architecture =

The year 1727 in architecture involved some significant events.

== Buildings and structures ==
=== Buildings ===
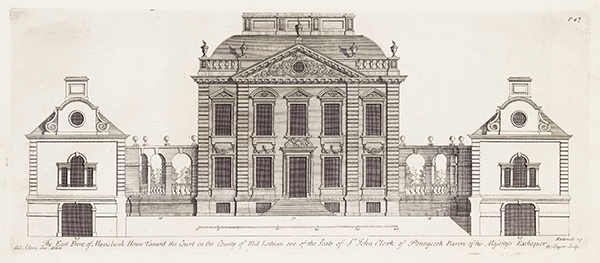
Mavisbank

- The baroque Catholic church of Santiago Apóstol is built in Albatera, Spain.
- The first Palladian villa in Scotland, Mavisbank House, designed by William Adam in collaboration with his client, Sir John Clerk of Penicuik, is completed.
- Widcombe Manor House, Bath, England.
- Church of Saint Maurice (Ebersmunster) in Alsace, designed by Peter Thumb, is completed.
- Trinitarian Church of Bratislava sanctified.
- Baclayon Church in the Philippines rebuilt in stone.
- Virga Jesse church, Hasselt, Flanders, built.
- First Presbyterian Church (Trenton, New Jersey) built.
- Construction of Menshikov Palace (Saint Petersburg) (opened 1711) is completed.
- Pilgrimage Church of Saint John of Nepomuk, Grünberg (Zelená hora), Bohemia, designed by Jan Santini Aichel, is completed.

== Awards ==
- Grand Prix de Rome, architecture: François Gallot.

== Births ==
- Johann Nepomuk Fuchs, Lower Styrian church architect (d. 1804)
- Pierre-Louis Moreau-Desproux, French neoclassical architect (d. 1793)

== Deaths ==
- April 18 – Matthias Steinl, Austrian baroque sculptor and architect (b. c.1644)
