= Benejúzar =

- Municipality
- Coat of arms

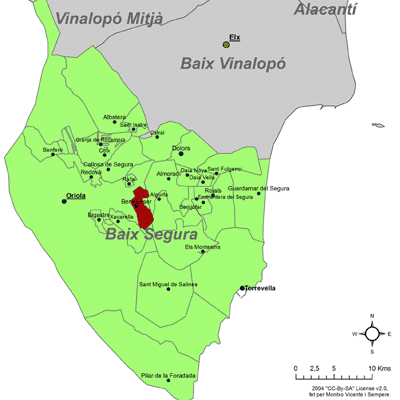

- Location in the Province of Alicante Location in the Valencian Community Location in Spain
- Coordinates: 38°4′40″N 0°50′19″W
- Country: Spain
- Autonomous community: Valencian Community
- Province: Alicante
- Comarca: Vega Baja del Segura
- Judicial district: Orihuela

Government
  - Alcalde: Antonio Bernabé Bernabé (2007) (PP)

Area
  - Total: 34.89 km^{2} (13.47 sq mi)
- Elevation: 39 m (128 ft)

Population (2025-01-01)
  - Total: 5,811
  - Density: 166.6/km^{2} (431.4/sq mi)
- Demonym: Benejucense
- Time zone: UTC+1 (CET)
  - Summer (DST): UTC+2 (CEST)
- Postal code: 03390
- Official language(s): Spanish

Benejúzar (Spanish: [beneˈxuθaɾ]; Valencian: Benejússer) is a town and municipality located in the comarca of Vega Baja del Segura, in the province of Alicante, Spain. Benejúzar has an area of 9.3 km² and, according to the 2005 census, a total population of 5,249 inhabitants. The economy of Benejúzar is mainly based on agriculture (lime farming). The most important monument in the city is the Catholic church of Virgen del Rosario, built in 1611.

== Notable people ==
- Rufete, footballer
