= San Isidro, Alicante =

San Isidro
- Municipality
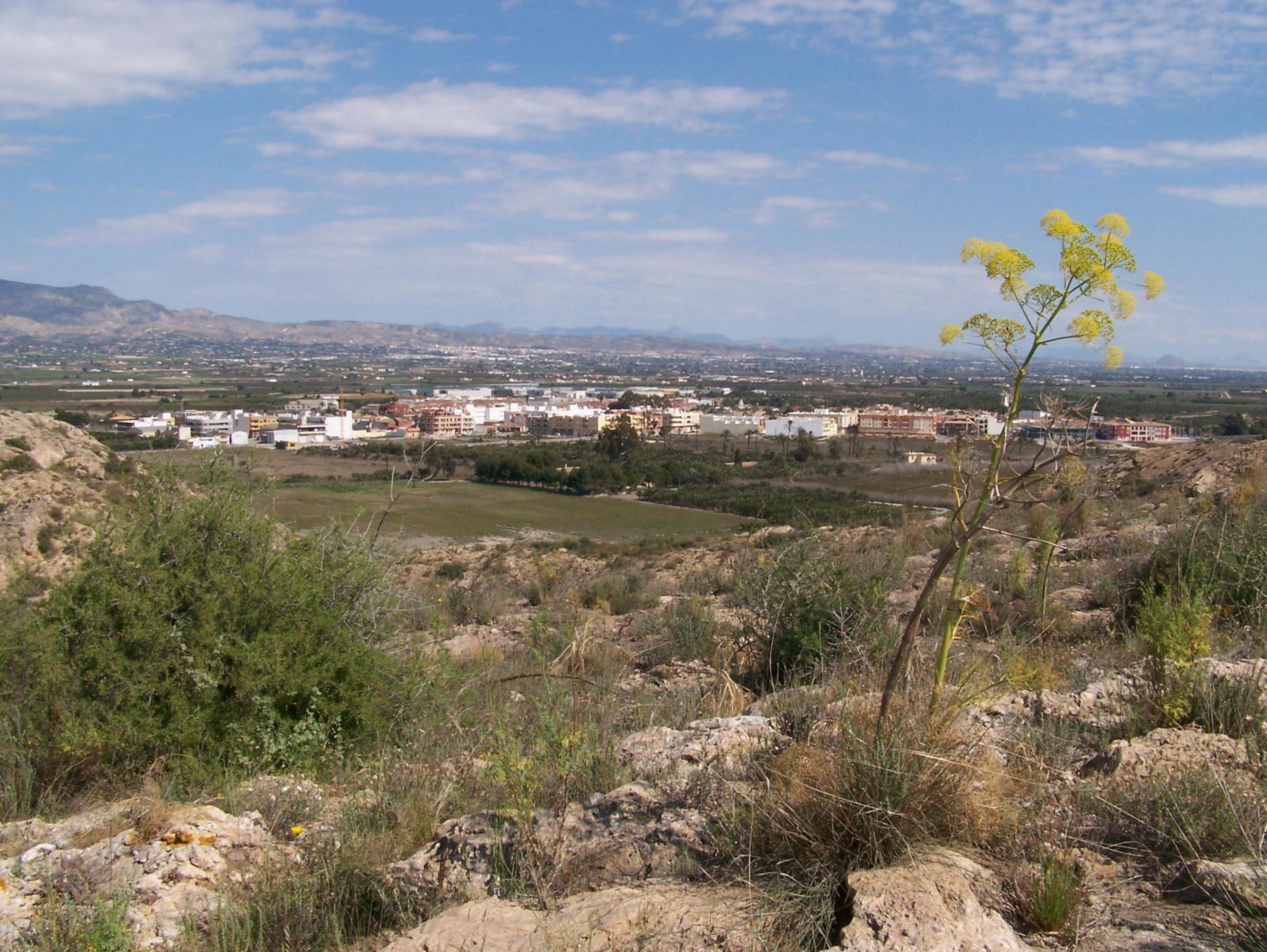
- San Isidro from the Cabezo de los Ojales/de las Fuentes

- Coat of arms

- Location of San Isidro San Isidro (Valencian Community)
- Coordinates: 38.166944°N 0.84°W
- Country: Spain
- Community: Valencia
- Province: Alicante
- Comarca: Vega Baja del Segura

Government
  - Mayor: Fernando Morales Gimenez

Area
  - Total: 11.7 km^{2} (4.5 sq mi)
- Elevation: 12 m (39 ft)

Population (2023)
  - Total: 2,208
  - Density: 189/km^{2} (489/sq mi)
- Time zone: UTC+1 (CET)
  - Summer (DST): UTC+2 (CEST)
- Postal code: 03349
- Website: www.sanisidro.es/

San Isidro is a village in the province of Alicante and autonomous community of Valencia, Spain. The municipality covers an area of 11.69 square kilometres (4.51 sq mi) and as of 2011 had a population of 1,934 people.
