= Almoradí =

Almoradi
- Municipality
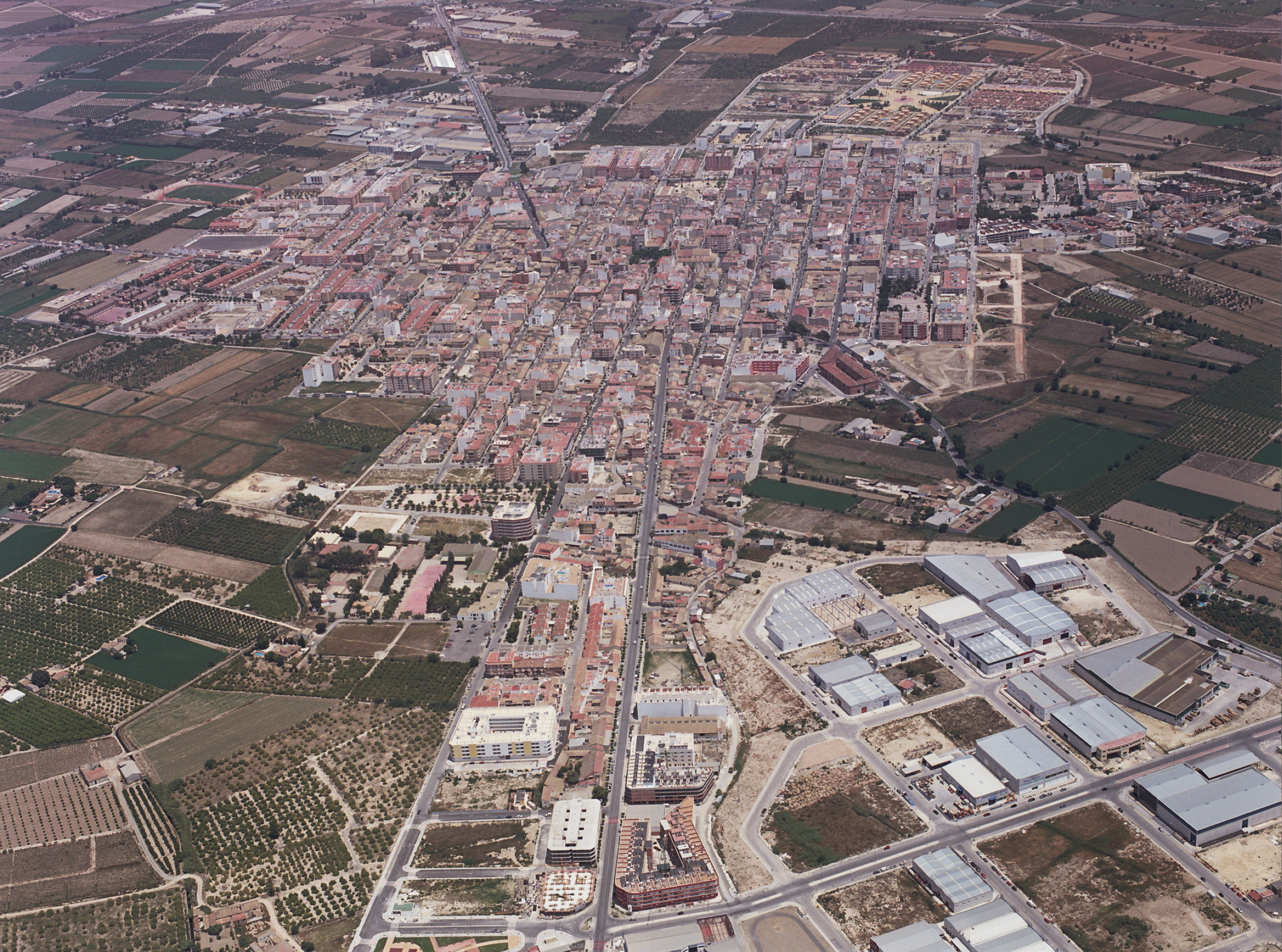

- Coat of arms

- Location in Spain
- Coordinates: 38°6′35″N 0°47′22″W
- Country: Spain
- Autonomous community: Valencian Community
- Province: Alicante
- Comarca: Vega Baja del Segura
- Judicial district: Orihuela

Government
  - Alcalde: Antonio Ángel Hurtado Roca (2007) (PP)

Area
  - Total: 42.72 km^{2} (16.49 sq mi)
- Elevation: 9 m (30 ft)

Population (2025-01-01)
  - Total: 22,965
  - Density: 537.6/km^{2} (1,392/sq mi)
- Demonym: Almoradidense
- Time zone: UTC+1 (CET)
  - Summer (DST): UTC+2 (CEST)
- Postal code: 03160; en las pedanías y partidas 03169, 03179 (Las Heredades) y 03369 (Carretera al Mudamiento).
- Official language(s): Spanish
- Website: Official website

Almoradí (Spanish pronunciation: [almoɾaˈði]) is a town and municipality located in the comarca of Vega Baja del Segura, in the province of Alicante, Spain, close to the mouth of the river Segura. Almoradí has an area of 42.72 km² and, according to the 2011 census, a total population of 19,280 inhabitants; the latest official estimate (as at the start of 2020) is 21,208. The economy of Almoradí is mainly based on agriculture (vegetables, fruits and lemons). The most important monuments in the city are the Ancient Hospital and the mill of Alfeitamí.
