= San Miguel de Salinas =

- Municipality
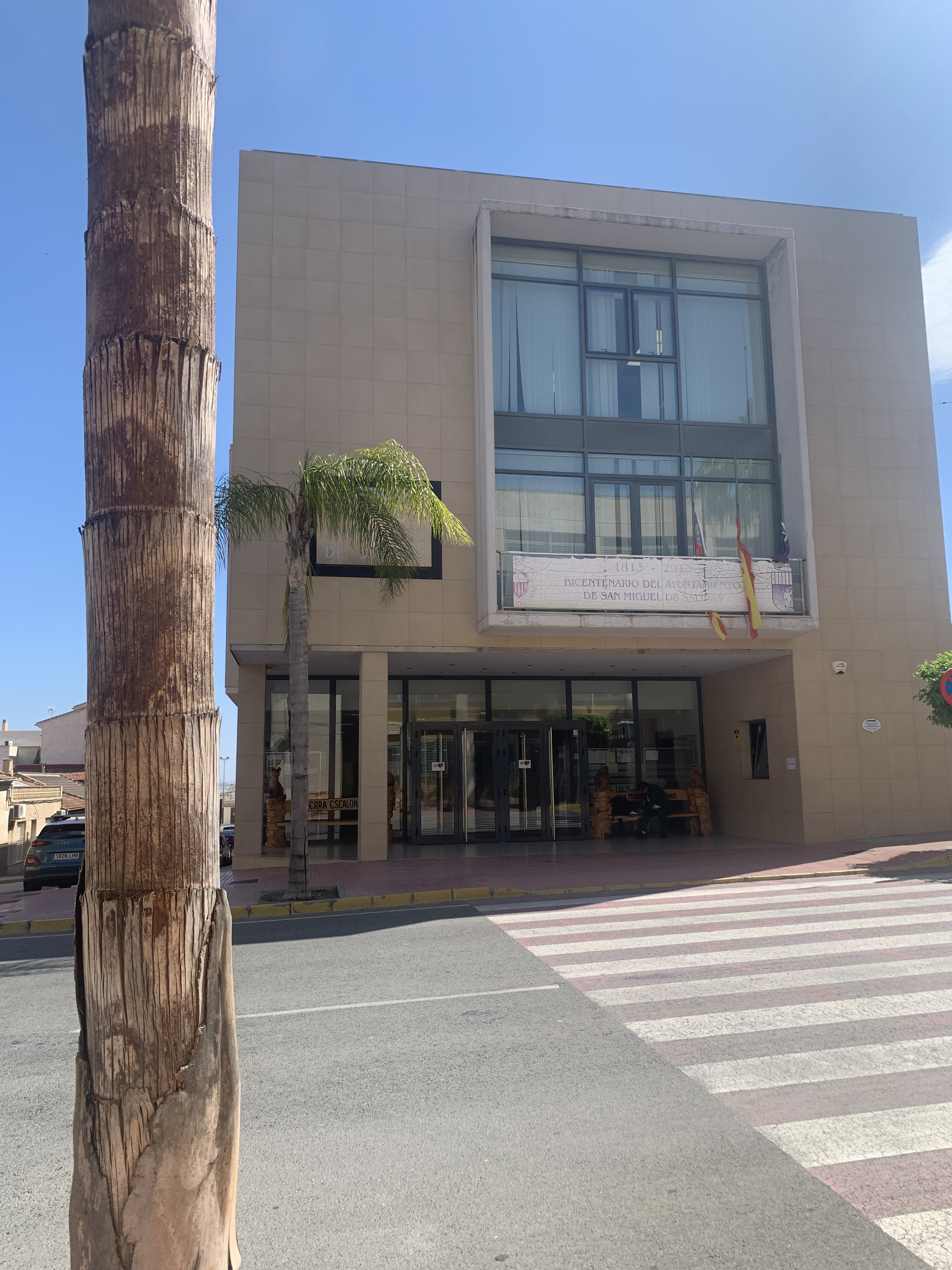
- Town hall

- Coat of arms

- Location in Spain San Miguel de Salinas (Valencian Community) San Miguel de Salinas (Spain)
- Coordinates: 37°58′50″N 0°47′23″W
- Country: Spain
- Autonomous community: Valencian Community
- Province: Alicante
- Comarca: Vega Baja del Segura
- Judicial district: Torrevieja

Government
  - Alcalde: Ángel Sáez Huertas (2007) (PP)

Area
  - Total: 54.90 km^{2} (21.20 sq mi)
- Elevation: 75 m (246 ft)

Population (2025-01-01)
  - Total: 7,177
  - Density: 130.7/km^{2} (338.6/sq mi)
- Demonym: Sanmiguelero -a
- Time zone: UTC+1 (CET)
  - Summer (DST): UTC+2 (CEST)
- Postal code: 03193
- Official language(s): Spanish

San Miguel de Salinas (Spanish pronunciation: [sam miˈɣel de saˈlinas]; Valencian: Sant Miquel de les Salines [ˈsam miˈkɛl de les saˈlines]) is a town and municipality in the Valencian Community (Spain), situated in the south of the province of Alicante; in the comarca of Vega Baja del Segura. In the 2006 census, the population was 7,104.

== Location and Geography ==
Located between Torrevieja and Murcia, San Miguel de Salinas is the highest town in the comarca. Its area (54 km²) descends from the mountain with many streams and gullies leading to the plain, known as El Llano, where the salt lakes are found. Local roads connect the town with Orihuela, Bigastro, Torrevieja and other towns in the area. From Alicante and Cartagena, the town can be accessed via the A-7 (E15) and AP-7 then the CV-940 and CV-941.

== History ==
It is thought that settlement began in the area during Roman times, at a place known as Nisdomia. The area has always been connected to the Orihuela district but in 1836 the town's urban area was separated from it and in 1955 the municipal boundary was extended into the country to form an imaginary triangle between the Pedrera Reservoir, the Torrevieja lagoon and La Peña del Águila.
