= Daya Nueva =

- Municipality
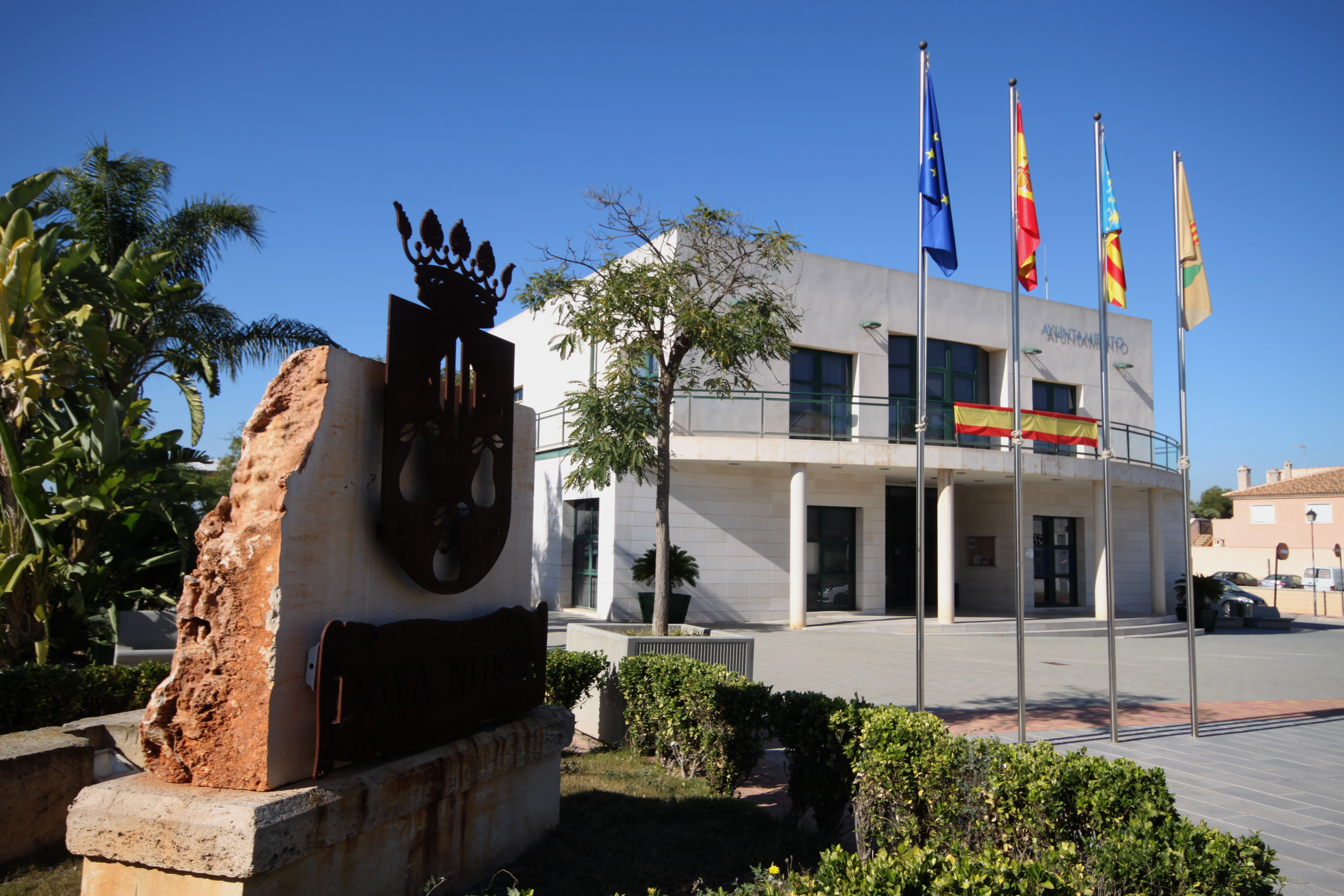
- Town hall

- Flag Coat of arms

- Location within Spain
- Coordinates: 38°6′49″N 0°45′41″W
- Country: Spain
- Community: Valencian Community
- Province: Alicante
- Comarca: Vega Baja del Segura

Government
  - Mayor: Pablo Castillo Ferri

Area
  - Total: 7.10 km^{2} (2.74 sq mi)
- Elevation: 5 m (16 ft)

Population (2025-01-01)
  - Total: 1,885
  - Density: 265/km^{2} (688/sq mi)
- Demonym: Dayeros
- Time zone: UTC+1 (CET)
  - Summer (DST): UTC+2 (CEST)
- Postal code: 03159
- Website: Official website

Daya Nueva (Spanish pronunciation: [ˈdaʝa ˈnweβa]) is a municipality in the comarca of Vega Baja del Segura in the Valencian Community, Spain.
