= Catral =

- Municipality
- Coat of arms

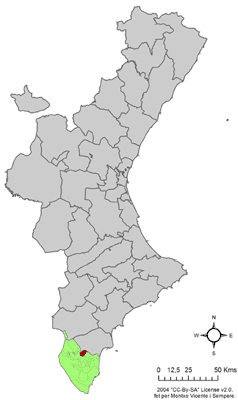
- Location Catral on the Valencian Community

- Location in Spain
- Coordinates: 38°09′34″N 0°48′18″W
- Country: Spain
- Autonomous community: Valencian Community
- Province: Alicante
- Comarca: Vega Baja del Segura
- Judicial district: Callosa de Segura

Government
  - Mayor: Joaquín Lucas Ferrández (2023) (PP)

Area
  - Total: 19.24 km^{2} (7.43 sq mi)
- Elevation: 12 m (39 ft)

Population (2025-01-01)
  - Total: 9,600
  - Density: 500/km^{2} (1,300/sq mi)
- Demonym: Catralense
- Time zone: UTC+1 (CET)
  - Summer (DST): UTC+2 (CEST)
- Postal code: 03158; and 3349 (road to San Isidro)
- Dialing code: +34 (Spain) + 96 (Alicante)
- Official language(s): Spanish
- Website: http://www.ayuntamientocatral.com/municipio.php

Catral (Spanish pronunciation: [kaˈtɾal]) is a town in the Valencian Community, Spain. Located in the south of the province of Alicante, in the region of Vega Baja del Segura. It had 8,105 inhabitants in 2007 according to the National Statistics Institute of Spain.

== History ==
Catral's origins are uncertain, as is the origin of the name. There are three theories: that the name is of Iberian origin (Kal turl the, meaning "double peak", which would make reference to close Cabezos of Albatera), which be of Hispanic origin (of Castrum Altum, "Villa fortified" in Latin) and Arab (Al-Qatrullät). In any case, the middle of 13th century ended the Muslim rule of Catral.

Conquered by the infant Alfonso for the Crown of Castile, he was awarded the Order of Santiago Catral sites and Callosa in 1255. However, the Castilian king reinstated the crown as in 1264. From 1296, Catral, like the southern half of the province, would go to the Crown of Aragon within the Attorney General Orihuela.

The town's farmland has increased significantly during the first two decades of the 18th century due to draining of wetlands, promoted by the Cardinal Belluga. In 1741, the 152 inhabitants of Catral paid 12,499 pounds for the title of Villa and his independence from Orihuela. In 1829, it was spared the devastating effects of an earthquake that destroyed much of the population of the region. Since then, it has held an annual thanksgiving to Saint Emigdio, patron saint against earthquakes, as a token of thanks for his intercession.

== Economy ==
Agriculture, citrus fruits, artichokes, cereals and olive trees (cultivated in orchards that are irrigated by canals which carry water from the Segura river) produce much of the wealth together with some livestock. Growth industries include furniture, distribution, textiles, construction, food, hides and tourism.

=== Distribution centres ===
Manufacturing, warehousing and logistic premises for retailers such as Retro Europe, Vitalgrana, Catral Export Grupo, S.l. and Chili Foot Wear. The Wheeler International distribution centre is located in the industrial zone adjacent to the Autopista AP-7 exit 730.

== Demographics ==
Catral has had a significant population growth since the 1990s. According to the census of 2008, the municipality had 8629 inhabitants.

Demographic evolution of Catral
	1857	1887	1900	1910	1920	1930	1940	1950	1960	1970	1981	1991	2001	2005	2006	2007	2008
population	3,078	2,593	2,592	3,007	3,000	3,025	3,391	3,871	4,183	3,904	4,209	4,394	5,146	6,642	7,530	8,105	8,629

== Government ==
Year	Name of mayor	Political party
1979–1983	Joaquín Ñíguez Gelardo	UCD
1983–1987	Francisco Gelardo Aguilar	PSPV-PSOE
1987–1991	Juan Gelardo Culiañez	PSPV-PSOE
1991–1995	José Manuel Rodríguez Leal	PSPV-PSOE
1995–1999	José Manuel Rodríguez Leal	PSPV-PSOE
1999–2003	José Manuel Rodríguez Leal	PSPV-PSOE
2003–2007	José Manuel Rodríguez Leal	PSPV-PSOE
2007-2011	Aurelio David Albero García	PP
2011-2015	Aurelio David Albero García (2011-2013) Pedro Zaplana García (2013-2015)	PP AxC
2015-2019	Pedro Zaplana García	AxC
2019-2023	Inmaculada Úbeda Pascual (2019-2021) Juan José Vicente Martínez (2021-2023)	PSPV-PSOE AxC
2023-	Joaquín Lucas Ferrández	PP

== Climate ==
Temperatures exceed 10 degrees in January and 26 degrees in July.

== Notes and references ==
- Flag image by Eduardo Gomez and extracted, with the consent of your website Vexilla Hispánica, http://www.vexilologia.es.
- Web site Town Hall of Catral, https://web.archive.org/web/20150202185613/http://ayuntamientocatral.com/municipio.php
