= Jacarilla =

Coordinates: 38°04′N 0°52′W

Jacarilla's coat of arms

Jacarilla (Valencian: Xacarella) is a municipality and village in the province of Alicante and autonomous community of Valencia, Spain. The municipality covers an area of 12.2 square kilometres (4.7 sq mi) and as of 2011 had a population of 2,102 people.

A country palace was built and owned by the Marques de Fontabla about 90 years ago. He died in the 1930s and his daughter married and moved away. The Fontabla family were noble land owners who owned most of the land in the village for centuries. In 1947, they divided up the land and sold it to the workers. The main source of income has always been agriculture, especially citrus fruits, oranges and lemons.

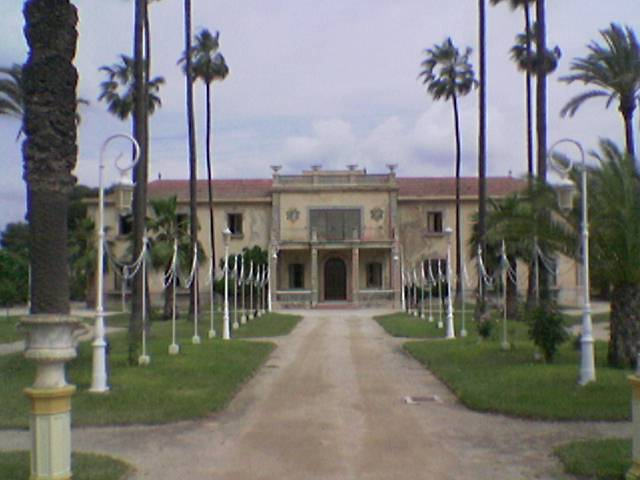
Jacarilla Palace.
