= Rojales =

Village in Spain

Coordinates: 38°05′N 0°43′W

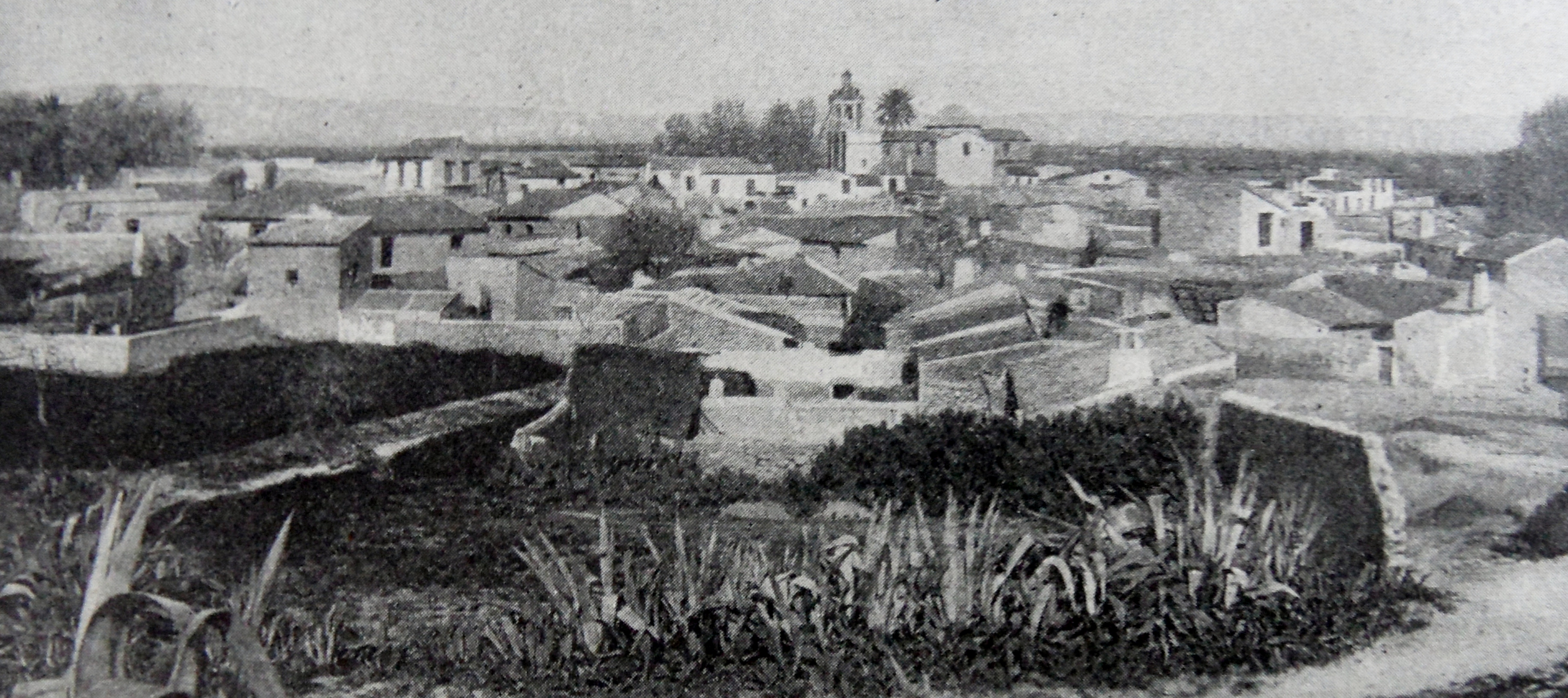

Rojales's flag

Rojales's coat of arms

Rojales is a village in the province of Alicante and autonomous community of Valencia, Spain. The municipality covers an area of 27.6 square kilometres (10.7 sq mi) and as of 2011 had a population of 21,583 people.
