= Albatera =

- Municipality
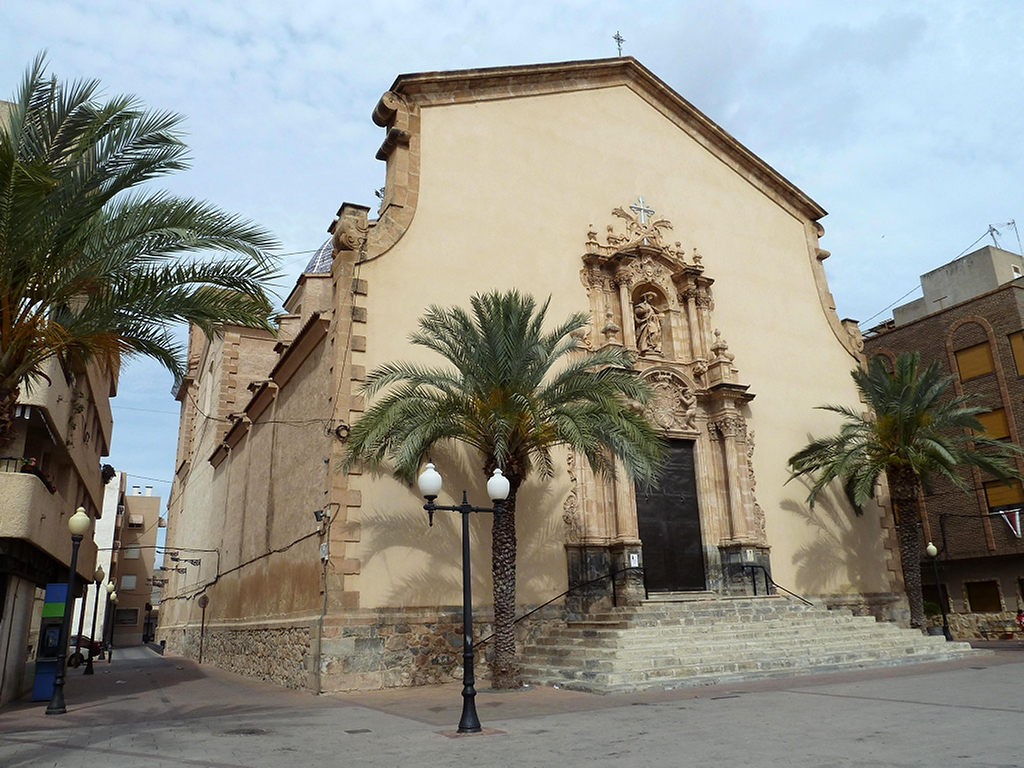

- Flag Coat of arms

- Location in Spain
- Coordinates: 38°10′43″N 0°52′5″W
- Country: Spain
- Autonomous community: Valencian Community
- Province: Alicante
- Comarca: Vega Baja del Segura
- Judicial district: Callosa de Segura

Government
  - Alcalde: Federico Del Pilar Berná Gutiérrez (2007) (PP)

Area
  - Total: 66,327 km^{2} (25,609 sq mi)
- Elevation: 20 m (66 ft)

Population (2025-01-01)
  - Total: 13,566
  - Density: 0.20453/km^{2} (0.52974/sq mi)
- Demonym: Albaterense
- Time zone: UTC+1 (CET)
  - Summer (DST): UTC+2 (CEST)
- Postal code: 03340; 03348 (partidas y fincas) y 03349 (Mos del Bou)
- Official language(s): Spanish

Albatera (Spanish pronunciation: [alβaˈteɾa]) is a town and municipality located in the comarca of Vega Baja del Segura, in the province of Alicante, part of the Valencian Community, Spain. Albatera has an area of 66.5 km^{2} and, according to the 2005 census, a total population of 10,499 inhabitants. The economy of Albatera is mainly based on trade, confección costura (Clothing Manufacture) and agriculture. The most important monument in the city is the baroque Catholic church of Santiago Apóstol, built in 1727.

Its name comes from the Arabic term “al-uatira”, which means, pathway or path. This toponim with the pass of the time was transformed to the current Latin origin word Albatera, changing completely its meaning to White (Alba) land (Terra) "Tierra Blanca".
