= Bigastro =

- Municipality
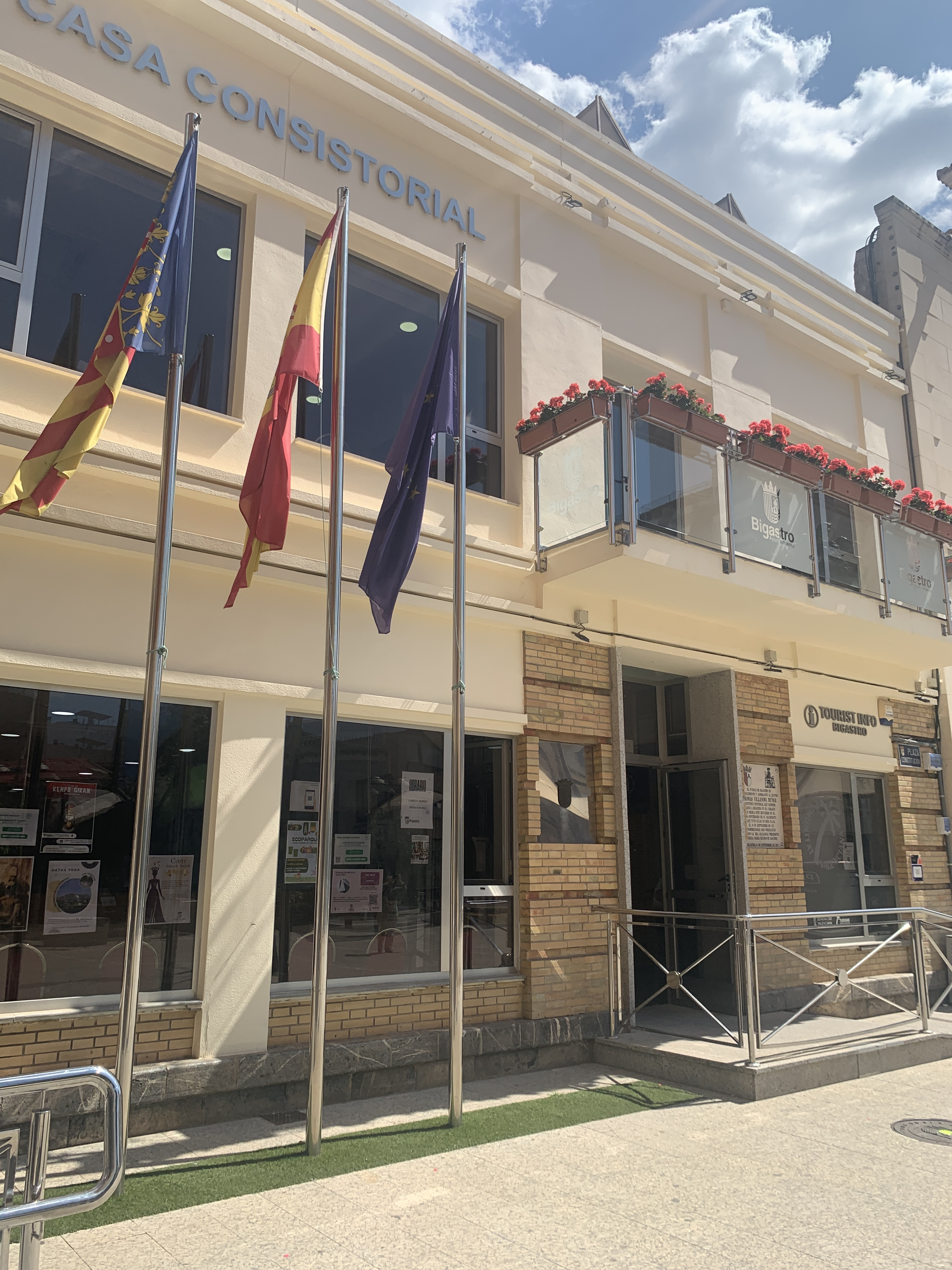
- Town hall

- Coat of arms

- Location in Spain Bigastro (Valencian Community) Bigastro (Spain)
- Coordinates: 38°03′47″N 0°53′44″W
- Country: Spain
- Autonomous community: Valencian Community
- Province: Alicante
- Comarca: Vega Baja del Segura
- Judicial district: Orihuela

Government
  - Alcalde (2015): Teresa María Belmonte Sánchez (PP)

Area
  - Total: 4.10 km^{2} (1.58 sq mi)
- Elevation: 24 m (79 ft)

Population (2025-01-01)
  - Total: 7,537
  - Density: 1,840/km^{2} (4,760/sq mi)
- Demonym: Bigastrense
- Time zone: UTC+1 (CET)
  - Summer (DST): UTC+2 (CEST)
- Postal code: 03380
- Official language(s): Spanish
- Website: Official website

Bigastro (Spanish pronunciation: [biˈɣastɾo]; Valencian: Bigastre) is a municipality in the Valencian Community (Spain) situated in the south of the province of Alicante, in the comarca of Vega Baja del Segura. It had a population of 6,450 at the time of the 2005 census.

== History ==
In La Loma, there is an archaeological site dating from the Bronze Age.

The city (Latin: Bigastrum) was the seat of a bishop under Byzantine rule. It was probably recovered by the Visigoths under Witteric.

The district derives its name from the Lugar Nuevo de los Canónigos, a place of residence for the canons of Orihuela cathedral, which once had power over the area. In 1701, after some lawsuits with the settlers, the church made some allowances which permitted the foundation of Bigastro, starting with three estates, in which 24 families lived.

== Economy ==
At the time of its foundation, agriculture was concentrated around flax and hemp; in the 19th century, the fall of the textile sector sparked interest in citrus fruits and products from irrigated fields. There is also industrial activity, mainly in the form of construction and manufacturing.

== Demography ==
In 2005, Bigastro had 6,450 residents, 11.79% of which were foreigners. The most common nationality was British (22% of all foreigners).

== Monuments ==
The young age of the town means that some landlord's homes survive, along with some farmer's dwellings dispersed throughout the area. One unique monument that must be mentioned is the Church of the Virgin of Bethlehem, where a sculpture of Saint Joachim of Salzillo.

== Gastronomy ==
The typical dishes in the area are stew and rabbit with rice. Other important dishes in Bigastro come from the pastry shops: almojábanas, toñas, almendrados, monas and soplillos.

== Twin towns ==
- France - Le Vigan (Gard), since 2002
- Italy - Cisano sul Neva, since 2002

== Festivals ==
- Night festivals and stalls are the essence of celebration dedicated to Saint Joachim in August. Others are El Rosario de la Aurora, every Sunday in October, the festivals of the Santa Cruz, of Romería de San Isidro and of Santa Ana. The musical tradition goes back over a century and is presented in the form of the Union Musical Band of Bigastro.
- El Abuelo, as he is normally known (Saint Joachim) over other titles. In October 1993, the 200th anniversary of his first arrival in Bigastro was commemorated, with the unveiling of a sculpture of their patron saint.

== Famous residents ==
- Francisco Grau Vegara; author of the Spanish National Anthem.
