= Guardamar del Segura =

- Municipality
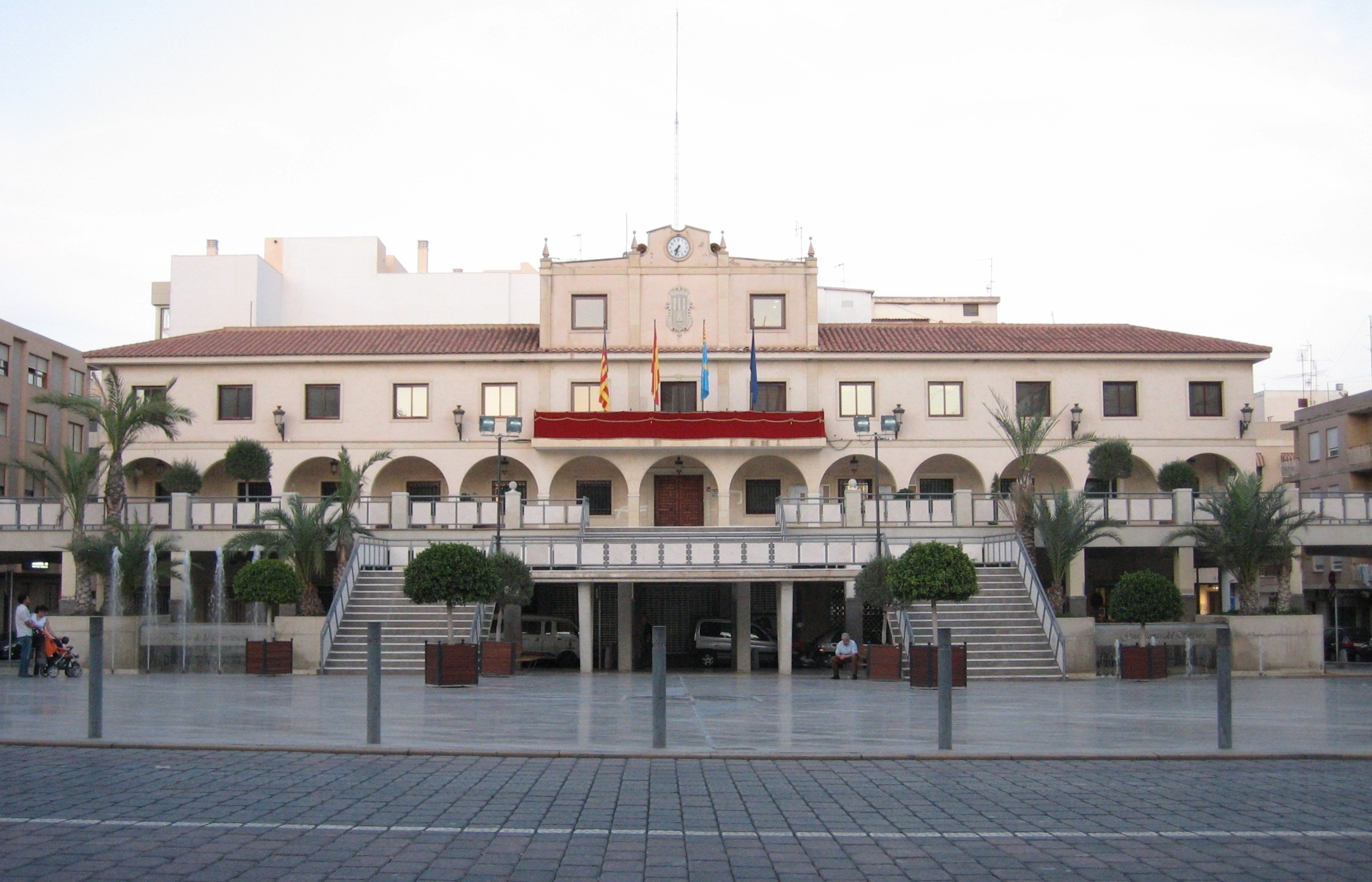
- Guardamar Town Hall

- Flag Coat of arms

- Location in Spain Guardamar del Segura (Valencian Community) Guardamar del Segura (Spain)
- Coordinates: 38°5′23″N 0°39′18″W
- Country: Spain
- Autonomous community: Valencian Community
- Province: Alicante
- Comarca: Baix Segura / Vega Baja
- Judicial district: Torrevieja
- Founded: 10th century

Government
  - Mayor: Carmen Verdú (2011) (PP)

Area
  - Total: 35.58 km^{2} (13.74 sq mi)
- Elevation: 25 m (82 ft)

Population (2025-01-01)
  - Total: 18,564
  - Density: 521.8/km^{2} (1,351/sq mi)
- Demonym(s): guardamarenc, -a (Val.) guardamarenco, -a (Sp.)
- Time zone: UTC+1 (CET)
  - Summer (DST): UTC+2 (CEST)
- Postal code: 03140 and 03149
- Dialing code: 965 and 966
- Official language(s): Valencian; Spanish

Guardamar del Segura (Valencian: [ˌɡwaɾðaˈmaɾ ðel seˈɣuɾa]), or briefly Guardamar, is a municipality of the province of Alicante located at the mouth of the river Segura in southern Valencia (autonomous community), Spain. It is a Mediterranean resort, with a large pine forest abutting an 11-km-long white sand beach.

Historically, it was an area of fishermen and farmers. A Phoenician colony, called Herna by Roman geographer Avienius in his book Ora Maritima was the first settlement near the mouth of Segura river, In Valencian, guardar means safekeeping and mar means sea, and this is another possible basis for its current name.

Guardamar is the southernmost Valencian-speaking town and in 1991 41.8% of the town's residents could speak it. Guardamar is also the only municipality of the Vega Baja del Segura comarca (known locally as Baix Segura) where Valencian is traditionally and widely spoken.

Guardamar hosts local festivals like Moros i Cristians (Moros y Cristianos), L'Encantà, and Fogueres de Sant Joan (Hogueras de San Juan), which commemorate its history.

== Population ==
The INE (Spanish Census) of 2006 showed that the city had 14,261 residents. By January 2011 this figure had reached 16,863 of which 10,051 were Spanish. The total dropped by 2015 to 15,589. The most prominent nationalities in 2015 were:

Historical population (1857-2015)
Year	Population	Year	Population
1857	2,696	1960	4,586
1887	2,549	1970	4,715
1900	2,862	1981	5,708
1910	2,898	1991	7,513
1920	3,067	2001	9,944
1930	4,016	2004	12,215
1940	4,703	2007	15,132
1950	4,704	2011	16,683
		2015	15,589

Foreign population (official data, 2015)
Nationality	Percentage
United Kingdom	8.93
Russia	3.49
Bulgaria	2.24
Germany	2.02
Ukraine	1.92
Morocco	1.71
Romania	1.37
China	0.84
Italy	0.76

== Government ==
Carmen Verdú is the mayor of the city. In the latest municipal elections of May 2011, Carmen Verdú of the People's Party (Partido Popular) won the elections with an absolute majority, larger than the one the former mayor (María Elena Albentosa) had, while the opposition (Socialist Party) lost some of their popular support. She is the second woman ever to occupy this position.

At the 2015 local elections, the political composition on the local council was:

Party	Seats
PP	8
PSOE	7
IU-Acord Ciutadà	1
We Want Guardamar del Segura	1

== Geography ==
=== Climate ===
Climate data for Guardamar del Segura
Month	Jan	Feb	Mar	Apr	May	Jun	Jul	Aug	Sep	Oct	Nov	Dec	Year
Mean daily maximum °C (°F)	16 (61)	17 (63)	19 (66)	20 (68)	23 (73)	27 (81)	30 (86)	31 (88)	28 (82)	24 (75)	20 (68)	17 (63)	23 (73)
Mean daily minimum °C (°F)	6 (43)	7 (45)	8 (46)	10 (50)	13 (55)	16 (61)	19 (66)	20 (68)	18 (64)	14 (57)	10 (50)	7 (45)	12 (54)
Average precipitation mm (inches)	25 (1.0)	29 (1.1)	28 (1.1)	34 (1.3)	29 (1.1)	20 (0.8)	7 (0.3)	13 (0.5)	37 (1.5)	67 (2.6)	46 (1.8)	36 (1.4)	371 (14.5)
Source: holiday-weather.com

== Points of interests ==
- Torreta de Guardamar, a radio mast. The tallest military structure in the European Union.
