= Alicante–Elche metropolitan area =

Metropolitan area in Spain

Coordinates: 38°22′19″N 0°37′13″W

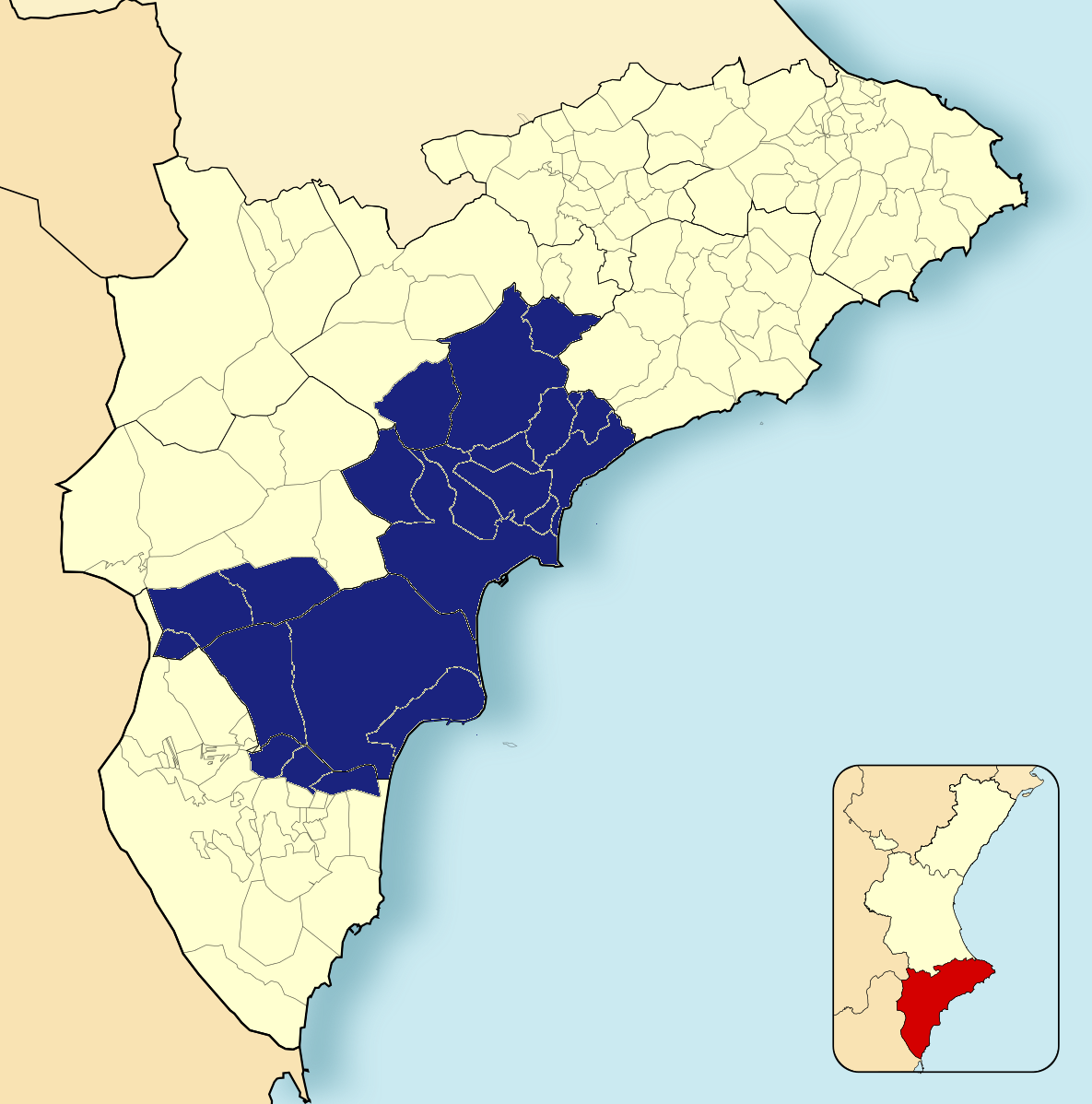
Map of the Alicante-Elche Metropolitan Area, within the Province of Alicante

The Alicante–Elche metropolitan area (Valencian: Àrea metropolitana d'Alacant–Elx, Spanish: Área metropolitana de Alicante–Elche) has 870,972 inhabitants (2023), making it the eighth largest metropolitan area in Spain by population, and the second largest in the Valencian Community.

According to their respective territorial metropolitan plans, the Valencia autonomous community is responsible for metropolitan territorial management. Its official definition is based on its own Territorial Action Plan (PAT).

It is located in the south of the Valencian Community, in southeastern Spain, and is characterised by significant urban expansion and population growth in recent decades. While the service sector predominates in the Alicante area, the industrial sector is more significant in the Elche area.

It comprises the urban areas of Alicante (512,352) and Elche (358,620), forming a bipolar or polycentric area. The main municipalities (by alphabetical order) are: Agost, Aigües, Alicante (Alacant), Aspe, Busot, el Campello, Catral, Crevillent, Dolores, Elche (Elx), el Fondó de les Neus, el Fondó dels Frares, Mutxamel, San Fulgencio, Sant Joan d'Alacant, Santa Pola, Sant Vicent del Raspeig, Tibi, la Torre de les Maçanes and Xixona.
