= Miguel Hernández University of Elche =

Public university in Spain

Coordinates: 38°16′30″N 0°41′03″W

Miguel Hernandez University
- Universitat Miguel Hernández; Universidad Miguel Hernández
- Type: Public University
- Established: 1996
- Affiliations: Vives network
- Rector: Juanjo Ruiz Martínez
- Students: 14,000
- Location: Elche, Sant Joan d'Alacant, Altea and Orihuela, Spain
- Campus: 5 campuses: Elche, Sant Joan, Altea, Orihuela-Salesas, Orihuela-Desamparados
- Website: http://www.umh.es

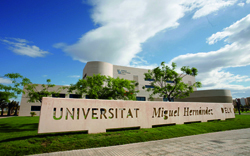
Rectorado Building, Campus of Elche, UMH.

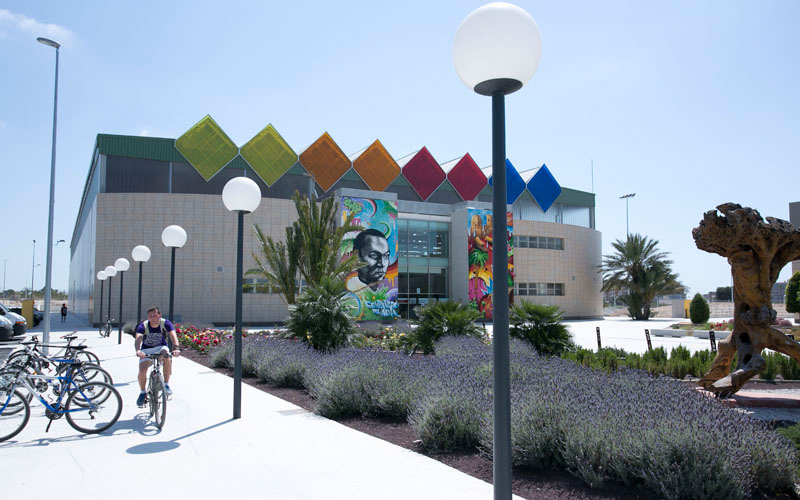
Campus of Elche, UMH.

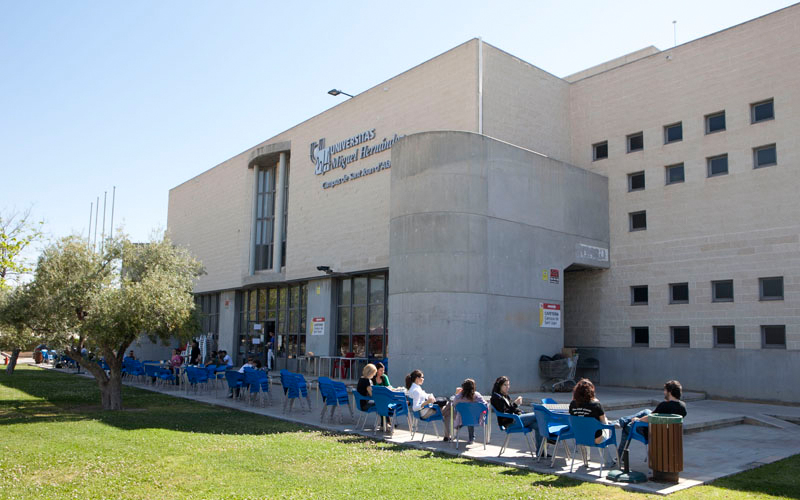
Campus of Sant Joan, UMH.

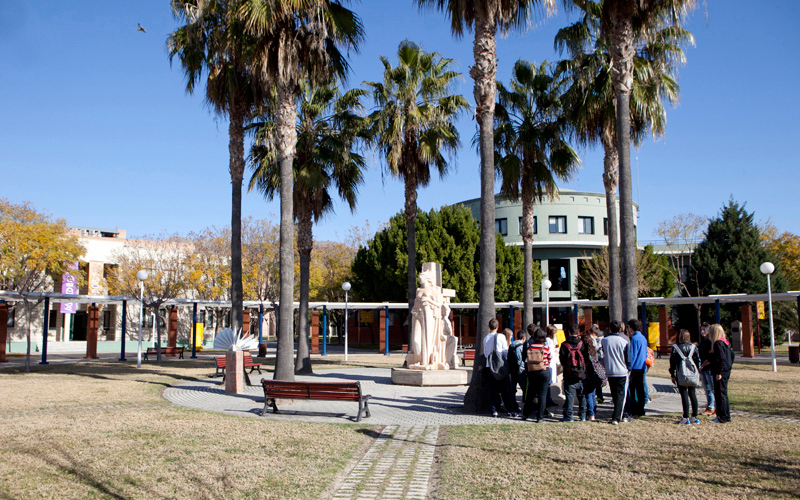
Campus of Orihuela, UMH.

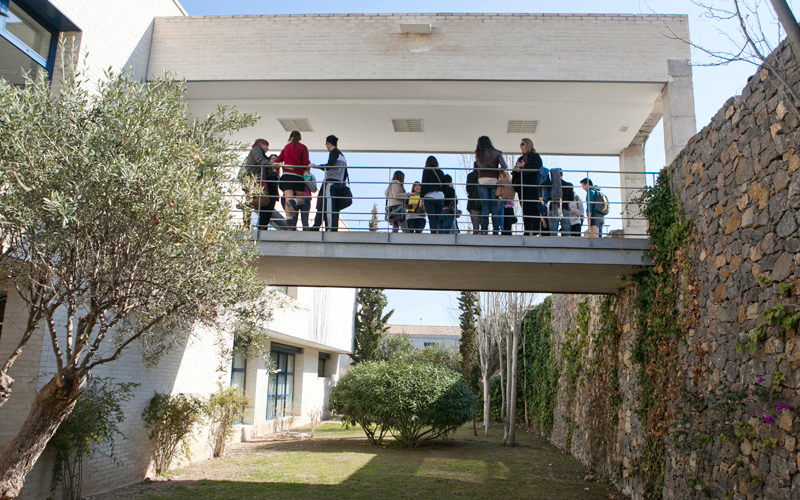
Campus of Altea, UMH.

The Miguel Hernández University (UMH, Spanish: Universidad Miguel Hernández, Valencian: Universitat Miguel Hernández, Latin: Universitas Miguel Hernández illicitana) is a Spanish Public University offering education, research and services facilitating the comprehensive development of its students. It is located in the province of Alicante and was established in 1996. Its name commemorates the Spanish poet Miguel Hernández.

The UMH offers bachelor's degrees, Master's and PhD programs adapted to the European Higher Education Area in the fields of the arts, experimental and technical sciences, engineering, and health and social sciences at its four university campuses (Elche, Altea, Orihuela and Sant Joan d'Alacant).

== Campuses ==
=== Elche Campus ===
The Office of the Rector and the University's central services, as well as four schools, four research institutes and twelve departments are located in the city of Elche. In particular, the degree programs taught here include law, journalism, business administration, labor relations and human resources, sports science, psychology, biotechnology, business statistics, environmental science, electrical engineering, electronic engineering, mechanical engineering, telecommunication technologies engineering and computer engineering in information technology, in addition to various masters and postgraduate courses. The campus contains sporting facilities including a golf course, paddle tennis courts, a pool, and a sports hall.

=== Sant Joan d'Alacant Campus ===
In Sant Joan d'Alacant, beside the university hospital, the UMH campus is dedicated to the health sciences. Housed here are two schools, two research institutes, six departments and several laboratories for training students. Degrees in medicine, physiotherapy, podiatry, occupational therapy, pharmacy and various postgraduate courses are taught on this campus. The Institute of Neuroscience and the Drug Dependence Research Institute have their headquarters at the Sant Joan d'Alacant Campus.

=== Orihuela Campus ===
In Orihuela, there are two schools and five UMH departments distributed between two university locations (Desamparados and Salesas), where technical and social science education, respectively, are offered. The courses taught at Desamparados, in addition to various masters, include food science and technology, agri-food and agri-environmental engineering. At Salesas, the degrees offered include business administration, political science and public management.

=== Altea Campus ===
In Altea is an educational center dedicated to the arts. Offered here is the degree in fine arts, and the campus contains a multi-sport court as well. This campus has workshops and studios for painting, sculpture, illustration, design, drawing, modeling, and dance for students in a fine arts curriculum. The master's degree of planning and landscape research is also taught here.

== Facts and Figures ==
Campuses

- Elche, Sant Joan d'Alacant, Orihuela, Altea
- Buildings: 75
- Total surface area of the 4 campuses (in square meters): 947,635 m^{2}
- Total constructed surface area (in square meters): 209,876 m^{2}

Personnel

- Full-time Faculty: 560
- Part-time Faculty: 464
- Administration and Services Personnel: 389

Research

- Average annual research income (previous 5 years): €10,939,846
- Annual scientific production (publications per faculty member) ranking among Spanish universities: 3rd place
- Journal publications indexed in ISI Web of Knowledge in 2010: 464

Students

- Full-time students: 14,500
- 17,000 alumni since university creation (1996)

Employability

- Agreements with more than 7,000 collaborating entities (80% within the private sector)
- 13,700 student internships in the last three years
- 98% business and 95% student satisfaction with the internship program

Internationalization

- International agreements with other universities: 318 (282 with European universities and 36 with non-European universities)

Annual budget

- €95,463,970

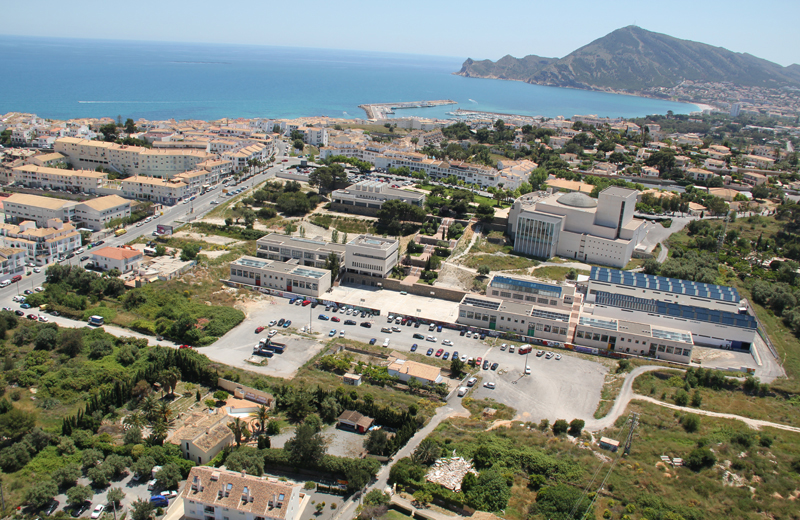
Campus of Altea, UMH (aerial view)

== Research ==
=== Research Institutes ===
==== Institute of Molecular and Cell Biology ====
The Institute of Molecular and Cell Biology (IBMC) aims for a multidisciplinary approach of excellence on a molecular and cellular level in the areas of biotechnology and health. Research at the IBMC is developed through two main lines of research: Molecular and Cellular Design and Molecular Diagnosis and Therapy. The Institute carries out intense translational and transferable technology research programs that have led to more than 20 registered patents and the creation of spin-off companies.

==== Institute "Center of Operations Research" ====
The University Research Institute "Center of Operations Research" (CIO) was established to support R&D activities in statistics, optimization and information technologies. The CIO comprises researchers from different fields (statistics, mathematics, computer engineering and marketing), forming a qualified interdisciplinary group capable of solving problems currently found in the business environment. The CIO continually searches for ways to improve the quality, efficiency and productivity in both public institutions and private companies.

==== Institute of Neurosciences ====
The Institute of Neurosciences (IN) is a joint UMH and CSIC research center devoted to the study of the structure, function and development of the nervous system under normal and pathological conditions. The IN is organized into three research units that include Developmental Neurobiology, Molecular Neurobiology and Cellular and Systems Neurobiology. Research groups at the IN use a wide variety of techniques covering the fields of molecular and cell biology, genetics and physiology.

==== Institute of Bioengineering ====
The Institute of Bioengineering (IB) focuses on the following areas: cell regenerative therapy, genetics of plant development, cell physiology, biomaterials, biomedical instrumentation, telemedicine, structural and functional genomics, toxicology and chemical safety, neurotoxicity and embryotoxicity, synthesis and design of organic molecules and polymers with biological and electronic applications, cell banks, clinical trials and drug monitoring.

==== Drug Addiction Research Institute ====
The Drug Addiction Research Institute (INID) is fundamentally oriented towards the development of research, education and application of programs and resources, through the provision of services and technical assessment for public and/or private entities that may require them in relation to all problems related to drug addiction. The INID approaches the problems of drug addiction through three research blocks: prevention, assistance, and reinsertion.

==== The Mediterranean Center for Environmental Studies ====
The Mediterranean Center for Environmental Studies (CEAM) is an institute of applied research created with the aim of undertaking R&D projects in environmental issues of special relevance for the Valencia Autonomous Community and the Mediterranean region. The CEAM houses the European Photoreactor (EUROPHORE), one of the largest simulation chambers for studying atmospheric chemistry processes. Other areas include the evaluation of plant injuries caused by air pollution, the study and forecasting of extreme weather phenomena, the study of climate change and the carbon cycle, the fight against desertification and the restoration of ecosystems affected by forest fires.

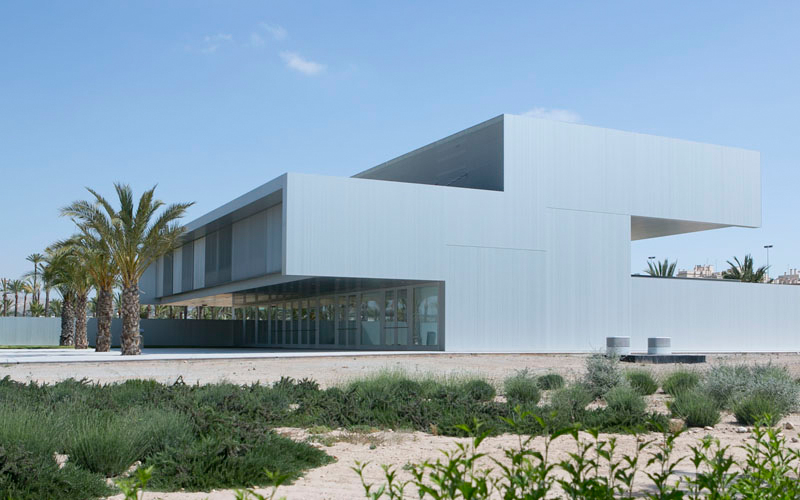
Scientific and Business Park, UMH

=== Scientific and Business Park ===
The Scientific and Business Park at the UMH is managed by the Fundación Quórum. The Park has four areas of specialization: the Biotechnological Business Innovation Centre (CIEB); ILINOVA, ICTs and Consulting; ILITEK, Engineering; and AGROTEC, focusing on the field of agriculture and horticulture.

Residing at the Park are an extensive number of businesses from sectors including biotechnology and health sciences, ICTs and industrial technologies, aeronautics, agro food and socioeconomics. The businesses installed at the park have a series of services at their disposal, like the search for technological partners, assistance in the search for public and private financing, administrative area outsourcing, assistance in business strategy and management and access to the UMH library and databases.

The Park is a member of the Association of Science and Technology Parks of Spain (APTE), the International Association of Science Parks (IASP), and a member of the Network of Valencian Science Parks (rePCV). It actively collaborates with the Centre for the Development of Industrial Technology (CDTI), being a node in the Network of R&D Information Points, as well as with the High Council of Chambers of Commerce, Industry and Navigation of Spain. The Park actively participates in the Assistance Program for the Creation and Growth of Innovative Companies of the Institute for Small and Medium Industry of the Generalitat Valenciana (IMPIVA), and along with the UMH, jointly promotes an entrepreneurial culture.

== Internationalization ==
One of the primary objectives of the UMH is its internationalization. To accomplish this, the University has increased its number of agreements with foreign universities in recent years, which has resulted in an increment of incoming and outgoing students and exchanges of faculty and researchers. UMH is continuously interested in fostering its international relations and expanding its number of foreign partners.

The UMH organizes language courses in English, French, German, Italian, Portuguese, and Spanish as a foreign language. Students can take the DELE examination, the Diploma de Español como Lengua Extranjera (Diploma of Spanish as a Foreign Language), at the UMH, which is a certification from the Cervantes Institute with international recognition.

== Controversies ==
Academic Plagiarism and Institutional Silence Case. The university has faced international criticism over its handling of academic integrity and the protection of intellectual property. In 2026, a formal complaint was brought against a Miguel Hernández University (UMH) professor, Joaquín Moreno, who was accused of plagiarizing a botanical teaching methodology known as the "Taylor Swift Method," developed by Brazilian researcher Gláucia Lidiane Silva from the Federal University of Rio Grande do Norte (UFRN).

Despite being presented with evidence that the professor utilized the method in a book chapter without proper attribution, UMH administration allegedly failed to take disciplinary action or issue a formal retraction, continuing to promote the work as an internal creation. Furthermore, university officials drew scrutiny after they reportedly instructed the affected Brazilian researcher to drop the matter and cease discussing the incident. Critics cited the incident as an example of institutional protectionism and systemic bias against researchers from the South Global.
