= Masters M80 Mile world record progression =

This is the progression of world record improvements of the Mile M80 division of Masters athletics.

Key

Incomplete information Pending

Hand	Auto	Athlete	Nationality	Birthdate	Age	Location	Date	Ref
	5:56.93	Jose Rioseco	Spain	30 April 1941	80 years, 79 days	Vigo	18 July 2021	
	6:22.69	Manuel Alonso	Spain	21 March 1936	81 years, 67 days	Sant Joan d'Alacant	27 May 2017	
6:26.6 h		David Carr	Australia	15 June 1932	80 years, 6 days	Perth	21 June 2012	
