= Altea =

- Town and municipality
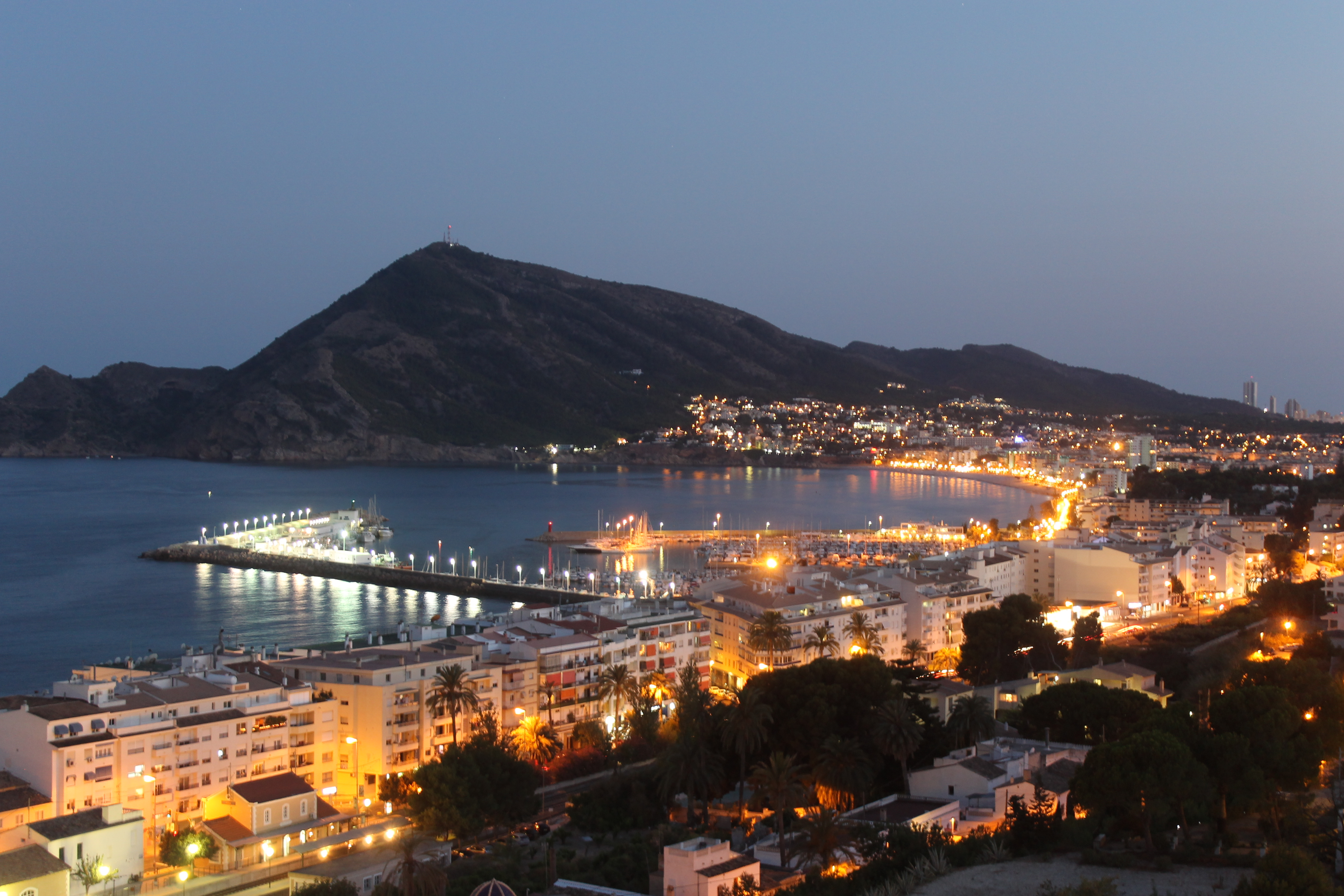

- Flag Coat of arms

- Location within Province of Alicante Location within Valencian Community Location within Spain
- Coordinates: 38°35′55″N 0°3′7″W
- Country: Spain
- Autonomous community: Valencian Community
- Province: Alicante
- Comarca: Marina Baixa

Government
  - Alcalde (Mayor): Jaume Llinares Cortés (2019) (Compromís)

Area
  - Total: 34.43 km^{2} (13.29 sq mi)
- Elevation: 61 m (200 ft)

Population (2025-01-01)
  - Total: 24,592
  - Density: 714.3/km^{2} (1,850/sq mi)
- Demonyms: Altean • alteà, -ana (Val.) • alteano/a (Sp.)
- Official language(s): Valencian; Spanish
- Linguistic area: Valencian
- Time zone: UTC+1 (CET)
  - Summer (DST): UTC+2 (CEST)
- Postal code: 03590
- Website: Official website

Altea (Note: Pronunciation of Altea: Valencian: [alˈtea] Spanish: [alˈtea]) is a town and municipality located in the Valencian Community, Spain, on the section of Mediterranean coast called the Costa Blanca.

At present, the economy of Altea is based on tourism, which started to grow in the 1950s because of its good weather, beaches and the labyrinthine streets with whitewashed house-fronts that characterize the town. Altea is protected on the north by the bluffs of the Serra de Bèrnia, creating an especially mild microclimate. Its seafront esplanade is planted with palms.

The town is notable for being residence of a number of affluent Russian migrants.

== History ==
The Iberian coastal settlements at the mouth of the Algar river in the wide Bay of Altea were later joined by a Greek marketplace, named Althaia.

During the Moorish domination the land around Altea belonged to the Taifa of Dénia until it was recaptured by the Christians in 1244 under James I of Aragon. The town was quickly fortified, and walls were erected to enclose what is now known as the "old town" outsiders.

== Gallery ==
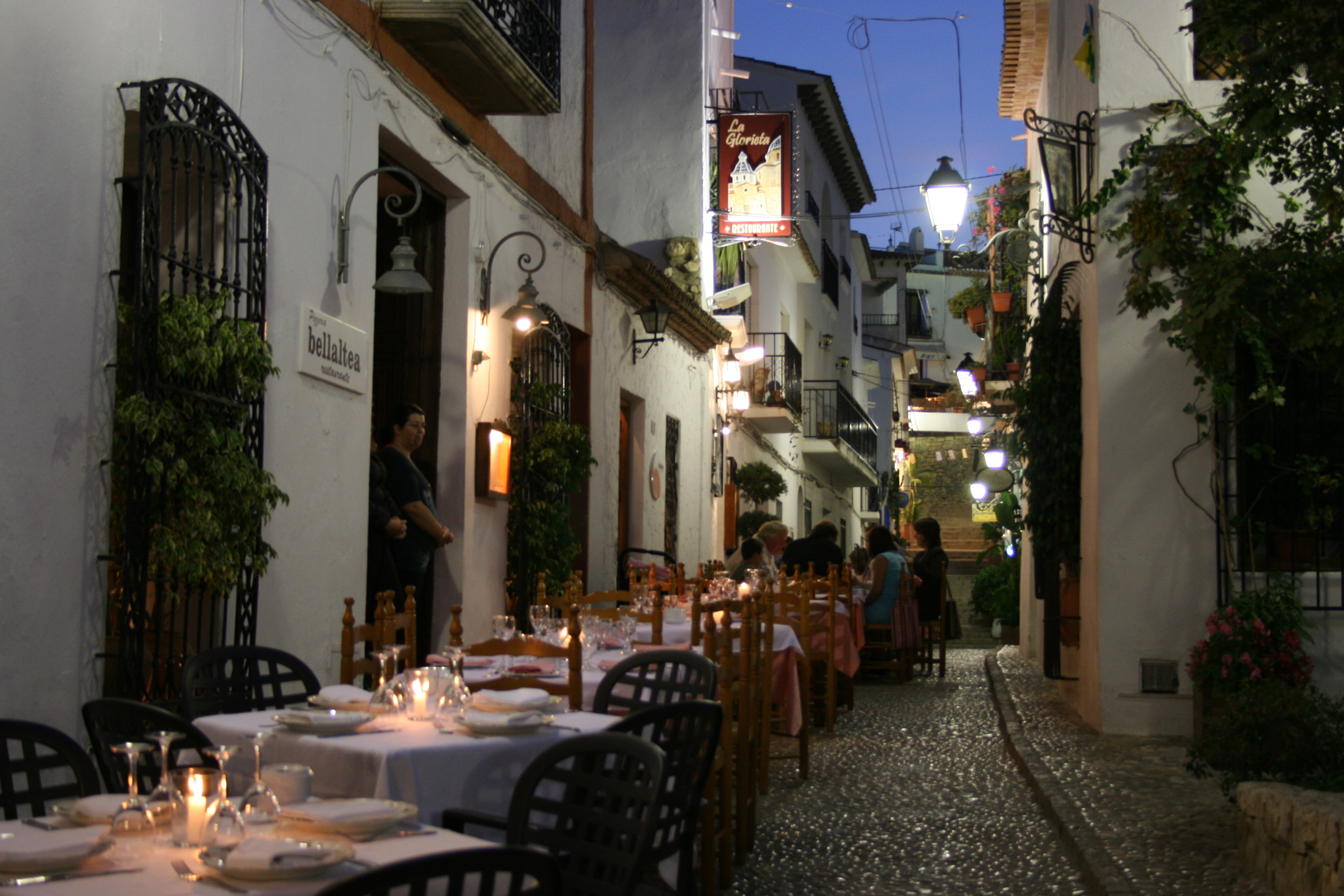
A street of Altea by night

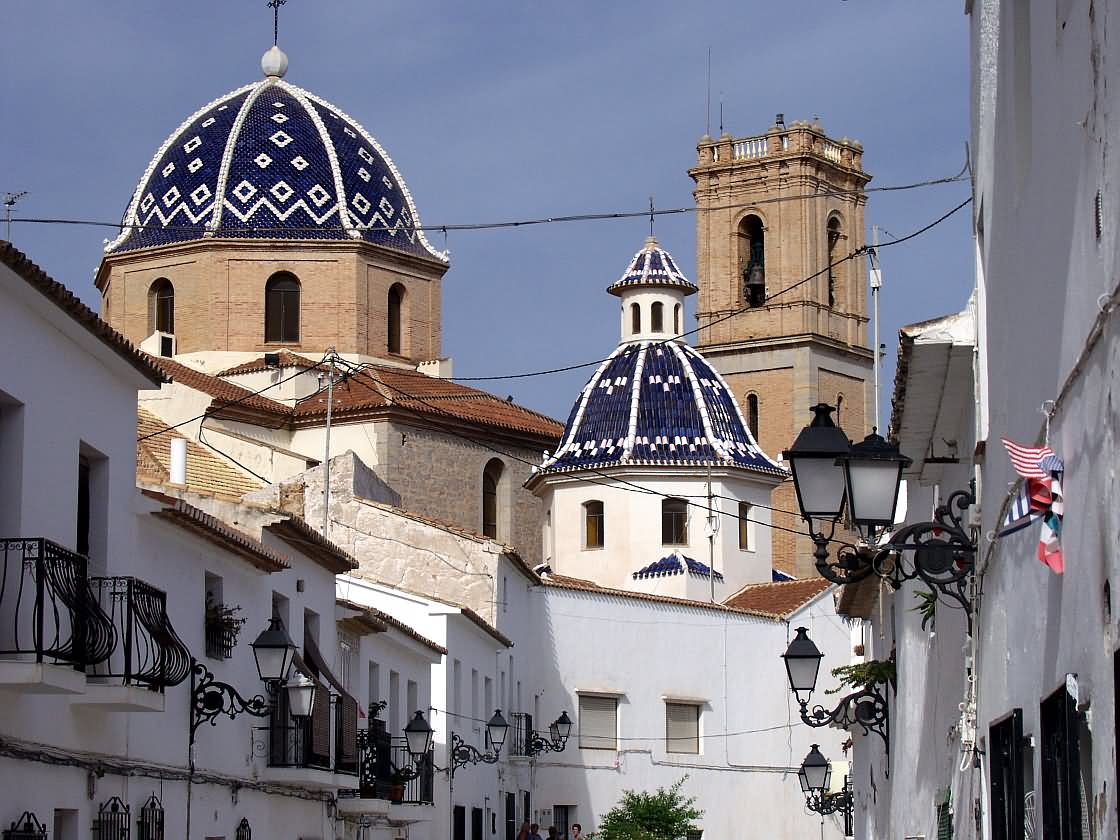
La Mare de Déu del Consol

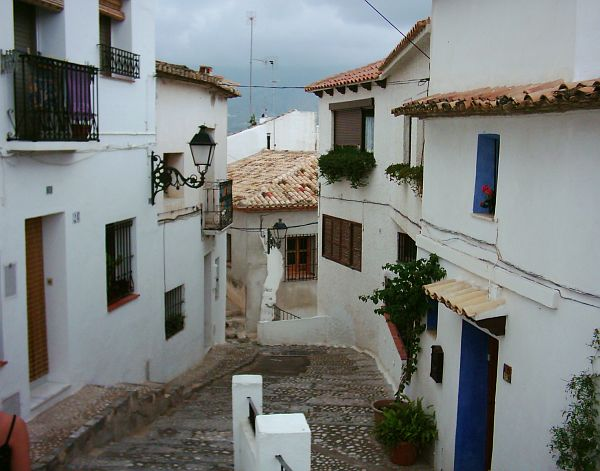
Streets of Altea

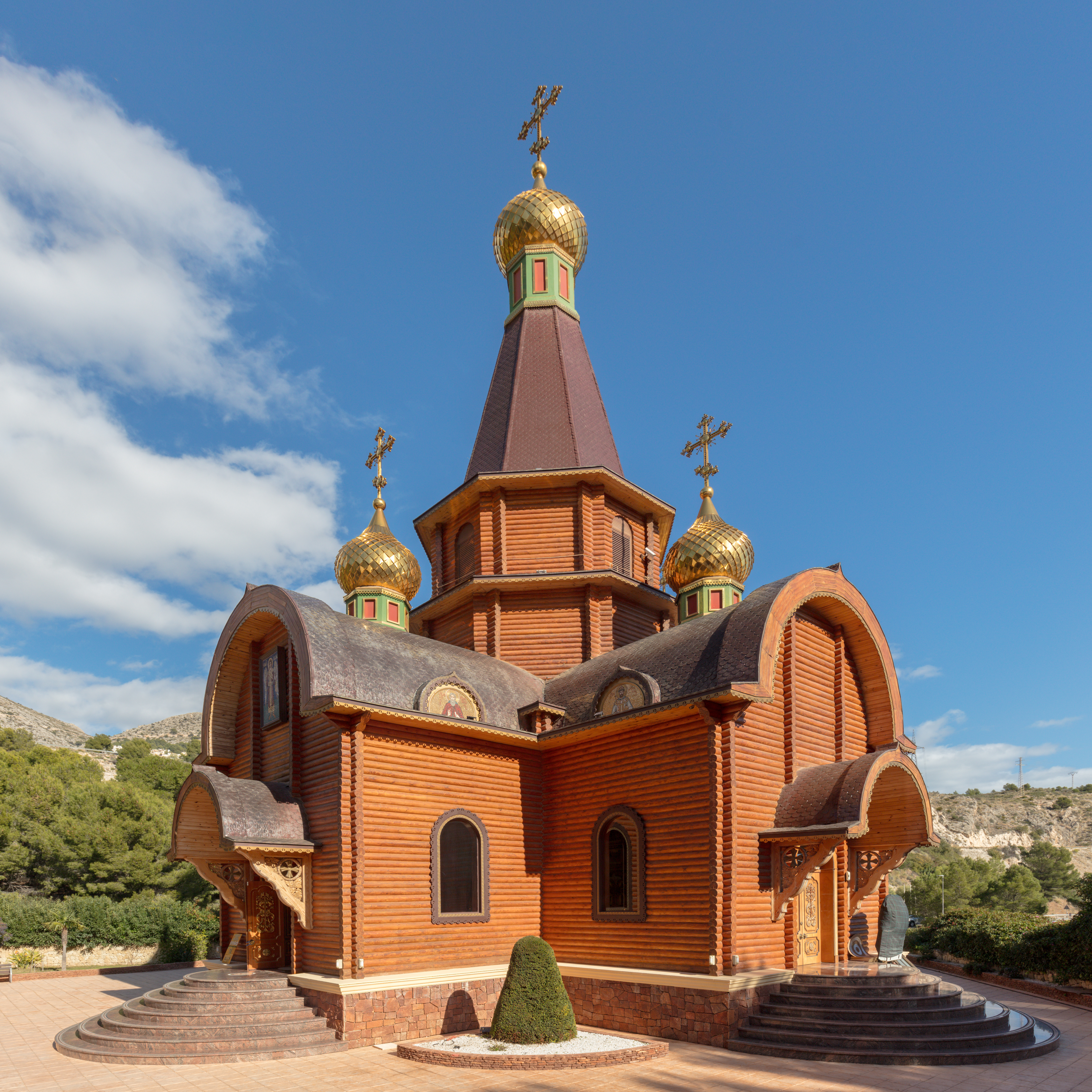
Russian Orthodox church

== Education ==
Altea shares a campus of the University Miguel Hernández, in which the Faculty of Fine Arts is located.

== Festivals ==
=== Castell de l'Olla ===
The most important and well-known festival in Altea is the Castell de l'Olla, a festival of fireworks that are launched into the sea, on the beach of l'Olla, giving rise to an impressive combination of light, gunpowder and music. In the Valencian language, this type of fireworks is called Castell (Castle). It takes place on the Saturday closest to the day of St. Lawrence, the 10th of August. The spectacle usually includes a golden-palm-tree-firework rising into the night sky. More than 50,000 people come every year to enjoy the spectacle, some sitting on the beach, others floating in rented boats to get a better view.

=== Moros i cristians ===
Every year, many Spanish cities participate in a symbolic war between Moors and Christians to commemorate the 500 years of Muslim dominance over most of the Iberian Peninsula and its end in the 15th century in the course of the Reconquista. The festival lasts several days, and is supposed to represent the fall of the town into the hands of the Moors and its recovery. On the fourth weekend in September, Friday, the festival begins with a peal of bells and a cannon fire. The inhabitants of the town divide into groups, as the two sides in the conflict, and stage battles in the old town and on the beach. In addition to the battles, the festival includes parades in costumes and dress inspired by the fashions of medieval times. The Christians are on horseback and wear furs, metal helmets, armour and arquebuses. In contrast, those who become Moors for the weekend ride camels or elephants and wear ancient Arab costumes.

=== Pasqua ===
In Pasqua (Valencian word for Easter), the inhabitants of Altea hold solemn, somewhat macabre processions throughout the town during the Holy Week, which have a vivid dramatic flair to them. There is also a carnival beforehand, traditionally and symbolically representing the last chance to have some fun before Lent begins.

=== Sant Antoni del Porquet ===
During Lent, Altea has a special festival dedicated to pork. Pork is very present in Spanish cuisine, with traditional hams, suckling pigs in celebratory meals and pig's tails or pig's trotters for stews. Nothing is wasted, every part of the animal is used. This festival takes place in mid-February, and consists of a parade through the old town at midday, after which everyone shares a hearty plate of rice, sings folk songs and dances, and finally tastes a roast pig.

=== Encontes ===
The Encontes festival is a celebration of the ancient art of storytelling. It is held from 15 to 20 May. Dozens of events are organised to entertain the visitors with stories and songs. This festival is aimed at all audiences.

== Twin towns – sister cities ==
Altea is a founding member of the Douzelage, a unique town twinning association of 24 towns across the European Union. This active town twinning began in 1991 and there are regular events, such as a produce market from each of the other countries and festivals. Discussions regarding membership are also in hand with three further towns (Agros in Cyprus, Škofja Loka in Slovenia, and Tryavna in Bulgaria).

Altea, Spain – 1991
Bad Kötzting, Germany – 1991
Bellagio, Italy – 1991
(Republic of Ireland) Bundoran, Ireland – 1991
Granville, France – 1991
Holstebro, Denmark – 1991
Houffalize, Belgium – 1991
Meerssen, the Netherlands – 1991
Niederanven, Luxembourg – 1991
Preveza, Greece – 1991
Sesimbra, Portugal – 1991
Sherborne, United Kingdom – 1991
Karkkila, Finland – 1997–2016
Oxelösund, Sweden – 1998
Judenburg, Austria – 1999
Chojna, Poland – 2004
Kőszeg, Hungary – 2004
Sigulda, Latvia – 2004
Sušice, Czech Republic – 2004
Türi, Estonia – 2004
Zvolen, Slovakia – 2007
Rokiškis, Lithuania – 2018
Marsaskala, Malta – 2009
Siret, Romania – 2010
Rovinj, Croatia – 2016
Asikkala, Finland – 2016
