= Alacantí =

Coordinates: 38°20′46″N 0°29′05″W

- Comarca
- Country: Spain
- Autonomous community: Valencian Community
- Province: Alacant / Alicante
- Capital and largest city: Alacant / Alicante
- Municipalities: 10 municipalities: Alacant / Alicante, Sant Vicent del Raspeig / San Vicente del Raspeig, El Campello, Sant Joan d'Alacant, Mutxamel, Xixona / Jijona, Agost, Busot, Aigües, La Torre de les Maçanes / Torremanzanas

Area
  - Total: 637.57 km^{2} (246.17 sq mi)

Population (2019)
  - Total: 487,113
  - Density: 764.01/km^{2} (1,978.8/sq mi)
- Time zone: UTC+1 (CET)
  - Summer (DST): UTC+2 (CEST)

Alacantí (Valencian: [alakanˈti]; Spanish: [alakanˈti]), also known in Spanish as Campo de Alicante (Note: Spanish: [ˈkampo ðe aliˈkante] and [koˈmaɾka ðe aliˈkante]) and Comarca de Alicante, is a comarca in the Valencian Community, Spain. It is bordered by the comarques of Marina Baixa and Alcoià to the north, Baix Vinalopó to the south and Vinalopó Mitjà to the west.

== Municipalities ==
The comarca of Alacantí comprises ten municipalities, listed below with their areas, populations and the average height above sea level:

Name	Population (2019)	Area (km^{2})	Elevation (AMSL)
Agost	4,758	66.64	376 m (1,234 ft)
Aigües (Aguas de Busot)	963	18.47	341 m (1,119 ft)
Alacant / Alicante	334,887	201.27	3 m (10 ft)
Busot	2,978	33.84	326 m (1,070 ft)
El Campello	28,349	55.27	26 m (85 ft)
Xixona / Jijona	6,865	163.76	453 m (1,486 ft)
Mutxamel (Muchamel)	25,352	47.65	63 m (207 ft)
Sant Vicent del Raspeig / San Vicente del Raspeig	58,385	40.55	109 m (358 ft)
Sant Joan d'Alacant (San Juan de Alicante)	23,915	9.64	40 m (130 ft)
La Torre de les Maçanes / Torremanzanas	661	36.48	788 m (2,585 ft)
Total	487,113	673.57	252 m (828 ft)

Municipalities of Alacantí

=== Subcomarques ===
The Alacantí comarca is made up of two subcomarques: Horta d'Alacant (Spanish: Huerta de Alicante) and Foia de Xixona (Spanish: Hoya de Jijona).
