= San Fulgencio =

Village in Spain

Coordinates: 38°06′N 0°43′W

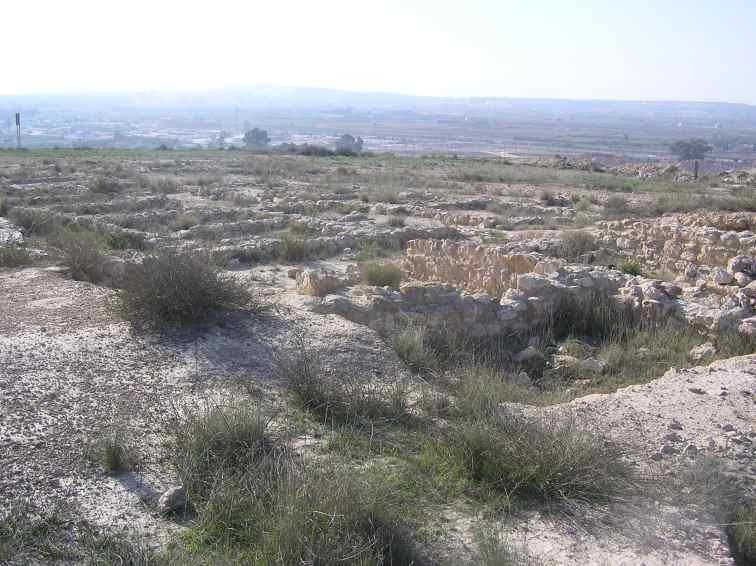

San Fulgencio's flag

San Fulgencio's coat of arms

San Fulgencio is a village in the province of Alicante and autonomous community of Valencia, Spain. The municipality covers an area of 19.75 square kilometres (7.63 sq mi) and at the 2011 Census had a population of 9,572, of whom 77% were of foreign origin; the latest official estimate (as at the start of 2019) was 7,855. English was the most spoken language in the town.
