= La Torre de les Maçanes / Torremanzanas =

La Torre de les Maçanes / Torremanzanas La Torre de les Maçanes / Torremanzanas
- Municipality
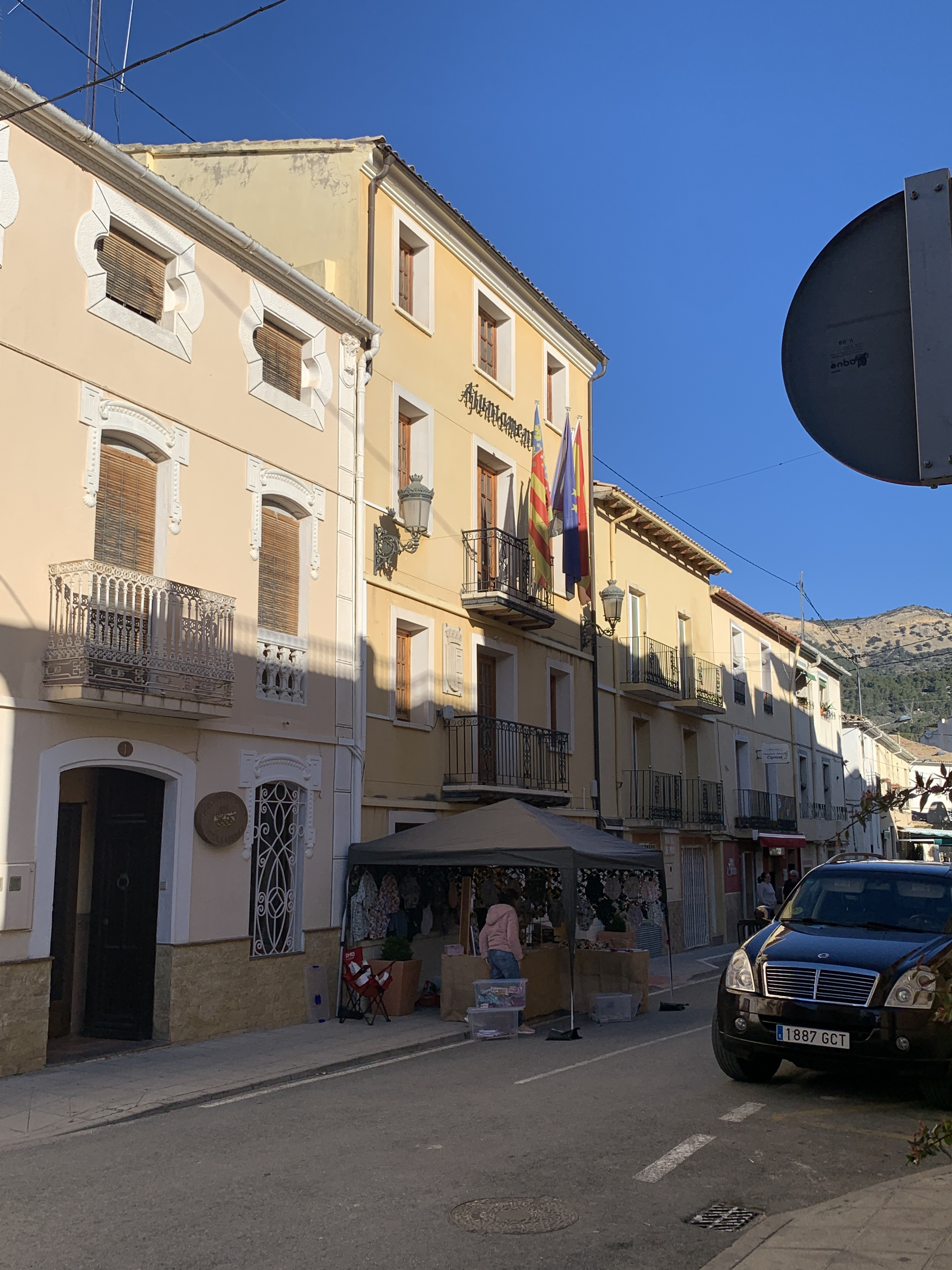
- Town hall

- Coat of arms

- Location in Spain
- Coordinates: 38°36′24″N 0°25′9″W
- Country: Spain
- Autonomous community: Valencian Community
- Province: Alicante
- Comarca: Alacantí
- Judicial district: Sant Vicent del Raspeig

Government
  - Alcalde: José Miguel Bernabeu Llinares.(2023) (PP)

Area
  - Total: 36.48 km^{2} (14.09 sq mi)
- Elevation: 788 m (2,585 ft)

Population (2009)
  - Total: 742
  - Density: 20.3/km^{2} (52.7/sq mi)
- Demonym(s): torruano-a, torrudano-a
- Time zone: UTC+1 (CET)
  - Summer (DST): UTC+2 (CEST)
- Postal code: 03108
- Official language(s): Spanish and Valencian
- Website: https://www.torremanzanas.es

La Torre de les Maçanes (Valencian: [la ˈtore ðe lez maˈsanes]) or Torremanzanas (Spanish: [ˌtoremanˈθanas]) is a municipality in the comarca of Alacantí in the Valencian Community, Spain. It owes its name to an ancient Almohad fortification located in the upper part of the town (Valencian Torre, English "Tower"). "Maçanes" means apples, the same than Spanish manzanas.
