= Agost =

Municipality in Valencian Community, Spain

- Municipality
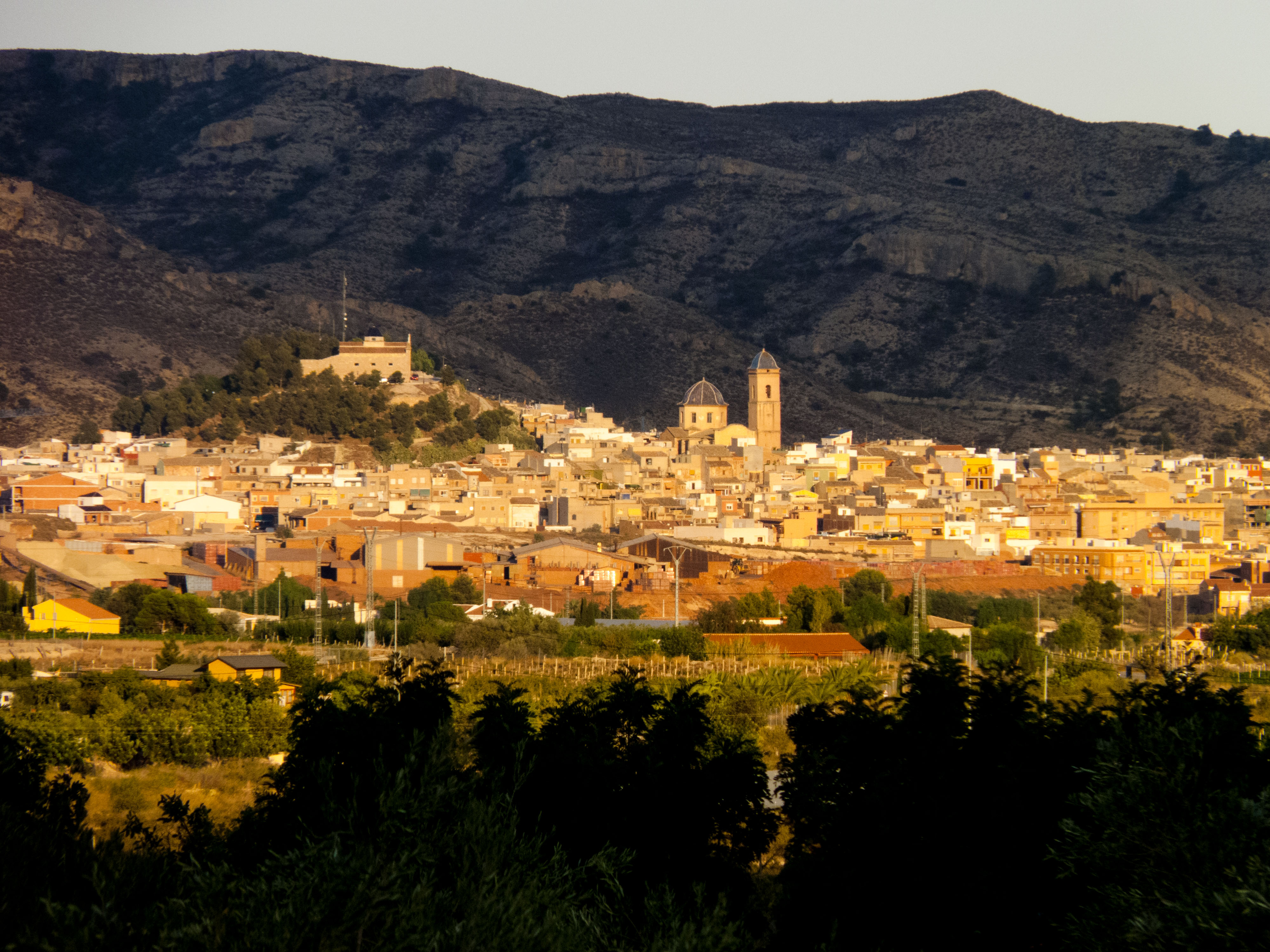

- Flag Coat of arms

- Location of Agost in the Province of Alicante Location of Agost in the Valencian Community Location of Agost in Spain
- Coordinates: 38°26′21″N 0°38′22″W
- Country: Spain
- Autonomous community: Valencian Community
- Province: Alicante
- Comarca: Alacantí
- Judicial district: Novelda

Government
  - Alcalde (Since 2019): Juan José Castelló Molina (PP)

Area
  - Total: 66.64 km^{2} (25.73 sq mi)
- Elevation: 376 m (1,234 ft)

Population (2025-01-01)
  - Total: 5,225
  - Density: 78.41/km^{2} (203.1/sq mi)
- Demonym: Agoster(a)
- Time zone: UTC+1 (CET)
  - Summer (DST): UTC+2 (CEST)
- Official language(s): Valencian
- Website: www.agost.es

Agost (Valencian: [aˈɣost]; Spanish: [aˈɣos(t)]) is a Valencian town and municipality located in the province of Alicante, Spain, at a distance of about 18 kilometres (11 mi) from Alicante, the capital of the province. Due to its relative distance from the Mediterranean Sea, Agost was not directly affected by the mass tourism that the towns on the Costa Blanca experienced, and has maintained its local character.

Until the sixties, the economy of Agost was mainly based on pottery and agriculture. Today most of the traditional potteries have closed, or turned into factories producing construction elements. There are still about 11 potteries active in the town; six of them still produce traditional pottery. Agriculture remains a second income source for many families in Agost.

== Sights ==
- The church (Sant Pere Apòstol)
- The hermitage (Ermita de les Santes Justa i Rufina) built in 1821
- The ruins of an old castle (Castell d'Agost and Castell de la Murta)
- Agost's museum (Museu de Cantereria), pottery museum in a turn-of-the-century pottery complex

== Fiestas ==
- Santíssima Mare de Déu de la Pau (15 – 24 January)
- El dia de la Vella (3 weeks after Ash Wednesday)
- Moros i Cristians, Saint Peter's day (end of June)
- Les danses del Rei Moro (26 December)
