= Xixona / Jijona =

- Municipality
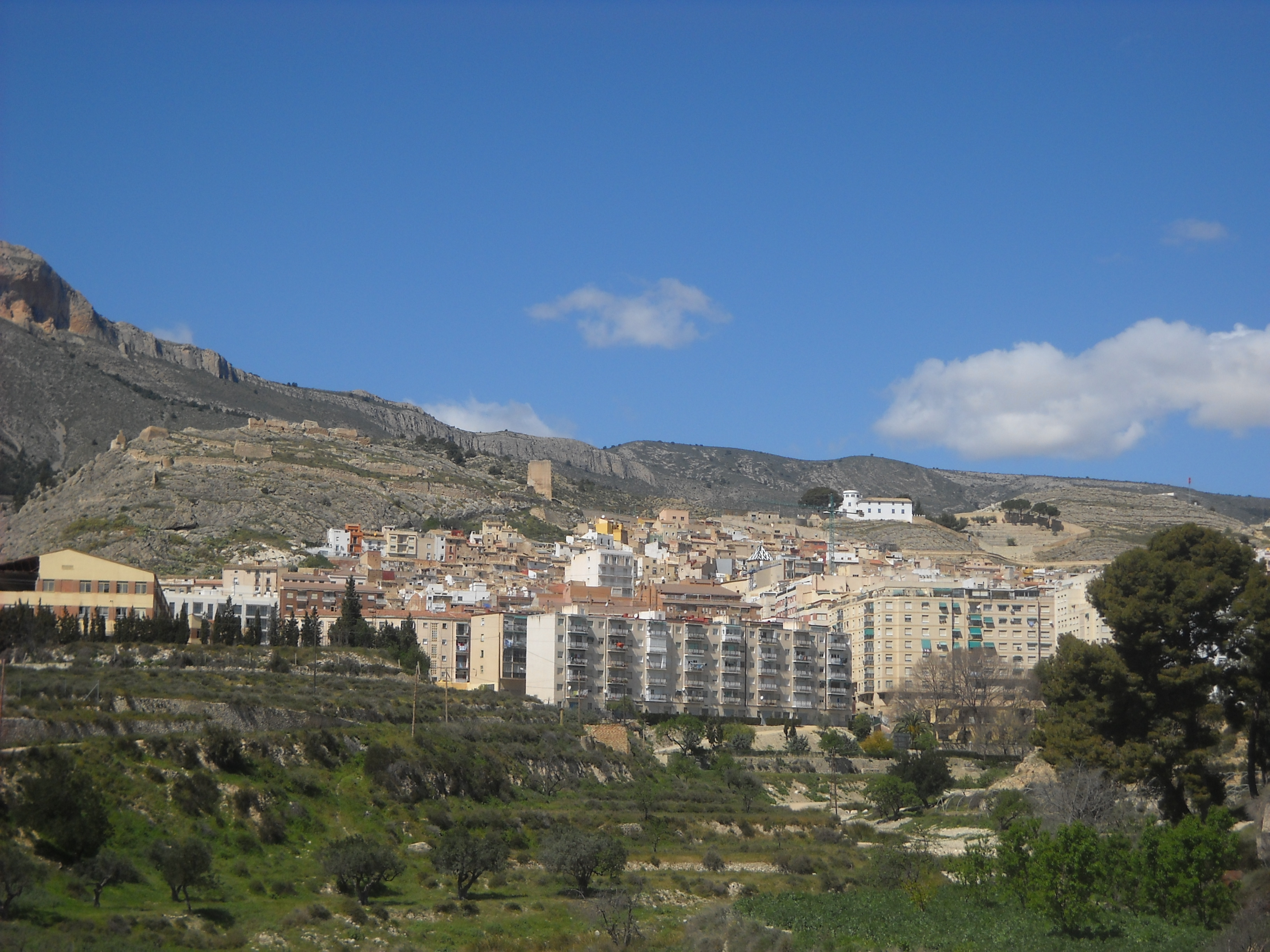
- Xixona / Jijona

- Coat of arms

- Location in Spain
- Coordinates: 38°32′21″N 0°30′29″W
- Country: Spain
- Autonomous community: Valencian Community
- Province: Alacant / Alicante
- Comarca: Alacantí
- Judicial district: Sant Vicent del Raspeig

Government
  - Alcalde: Isabel López (2015) (PSOE)

Area
  - Total: 163.76 km^{2} (63.23 sq mi)
- Elevation: 453 m (1,486 ft)

Population (2008)
  - Total: 7,575
  - Density: 46.26/km^{2} (119.8/sq mi)
- Demonym(s): • xixonenc, -a (Val.) • jijonenco, -ca (Sp.)
- Time zone: UTC+1 (CET)
  - Summer (DST): UTC+2 (CEST)
- Postal code: 03100
- Official language(s): Valencian and Spanish

Xixona (Valencian: [ʃiˈʃona]) or Jijona (Spanish: [xiˈxona]) is a town and municipality in the Valencian Community on the eastern coast of Spain.

== Turrón ==
The town is famous for a type of soft nougat, known in Valencian as Torró de Xixona and in Spanish as Turrón de Jijona. This is mostly due to the extensive almond farming that has existed since Moorish farmers originally cultivated the almond trees following the Islamic conquest of the Iberian Peninsula. Several factories produce nougat, which is distributed for sale principally around Christmas and the New Year, although now they are trying to expand its consumption throughout the rest of the year.

This kind of nougat is protected by the European Union, through the IGP (Indicación Geográfica Protegida).

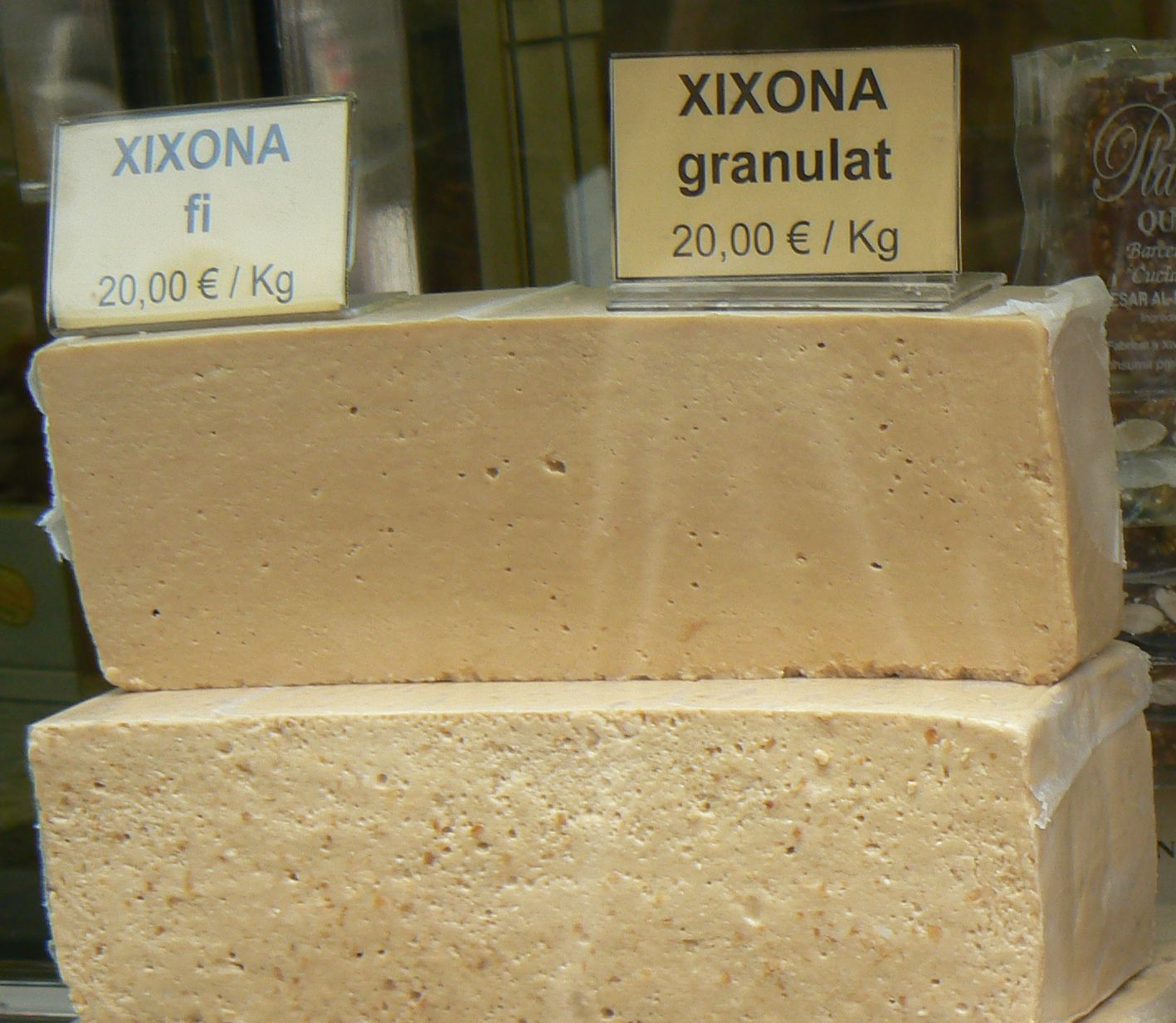
Fine and grainy turrón
