= Province of Alicante =

Province of Spain

Province of Alicante Provincia de Alicante (Spanish) Província d'Alacant (Valencian)
- Province
- Coat of arms

- Location of the Province of Alicante in Spain
- Coordinates: 38°30′N 0°30′W
- Country: Spain
- Autonomous community: Valencian Community
- Capital: Alicante
- Municipalities: 141

Government
  - President: César Sánchez Pérez (PP)

Area
  - Total: 5,818.30 km^{2} (2,246.46 sq mi)
  - Rank: 41st in Spain

Population (2025)
  - Total: 2,033,566
  - Rank: 4th in Spain
  - Density: 349.512/km^{2} (905.232/sq mi)
- Demonyms: alicantino,-na (es) alacantí, -ina (va)
- Time zone: UTC+1 (CET)
  - Summer (DST): UTC+2 (CEST)
- Official language(s): Valencian and Spanish
- Parliament: Cortes Generales

The Province of Alicante (/ˌælɪˈkænti/, also UK: /-teɪ/, US: /ˌælɪˈkɑːnti, ˌɑːl-/; Spanish: Provincia de Alicante, pronounced [aliˈkante], Valencian: Província d'Alacant, pronounced [alaˈkant]) is a province located in eastern Spain, in the southern part of the Valencian Community. It is the 2nd most populated Valencian province, containing the second and third biggest cities in the Valencian Community—Alicante (also known in Valencian as Alacant) and Elche (Elx), respectively. With a population of 2,033,566, it is the 4th most populated Spanish province as well.

Alicante is bordered by the provinces of Murcia on the southwest, Albacete on the west, Valencia on the north, and the Mediterranean Sea on the east. The province is named after its capital, the city of Alicante.

== History ==
The Iberians were the oldest documented people living in what today is the Alicante province. Belonging to these there are several archaeologic sites from which is especially known the one in La Serreta (near Alcoy) because the longest inscriptions remaining in the undeciphered Iberian language were found there.

Along the coast and contemporarily to the Iberians, the seafaring Phoenicians (in Guardamar) and Greeks (along the coastal section to the north of the Alicante city) settled stable trading colonies and interacted with the former (see Lady of Elche for the most renowned archeological piece of this period).

After a brief Carthaginian period, the Romans took over. Romanization in this part of Iberia was intense, the Via Augusta communicated this part of the Empire to the metropoli and so several cities thrived, from which the one known as Ilici Augusta (now Elche) even reached the status of colonia.

After a brief period of Visigothic ruling, the area was taken by Islamic armies and became a part of Al Andalus. From the 13th century, kings like Ferdinand III of Castile, James I of Aragon, Alfonso X of Castile, James II of Aragon reconquered the cities that Moors occupied. What today is the Alicante province was initially split between the Crown of Castile and the Crown of Aragon by means of the Treaty of Almizra, however later on the whole territory became under the control of the Kingdom of Valencia, which was a component Kingdom of the Crown of Aragon.

== Geography ==
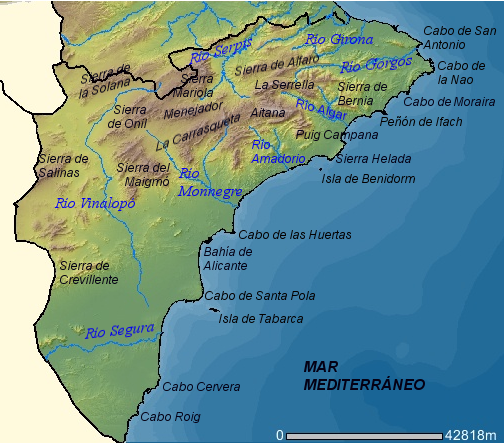
Physical map of the Province of Alicante

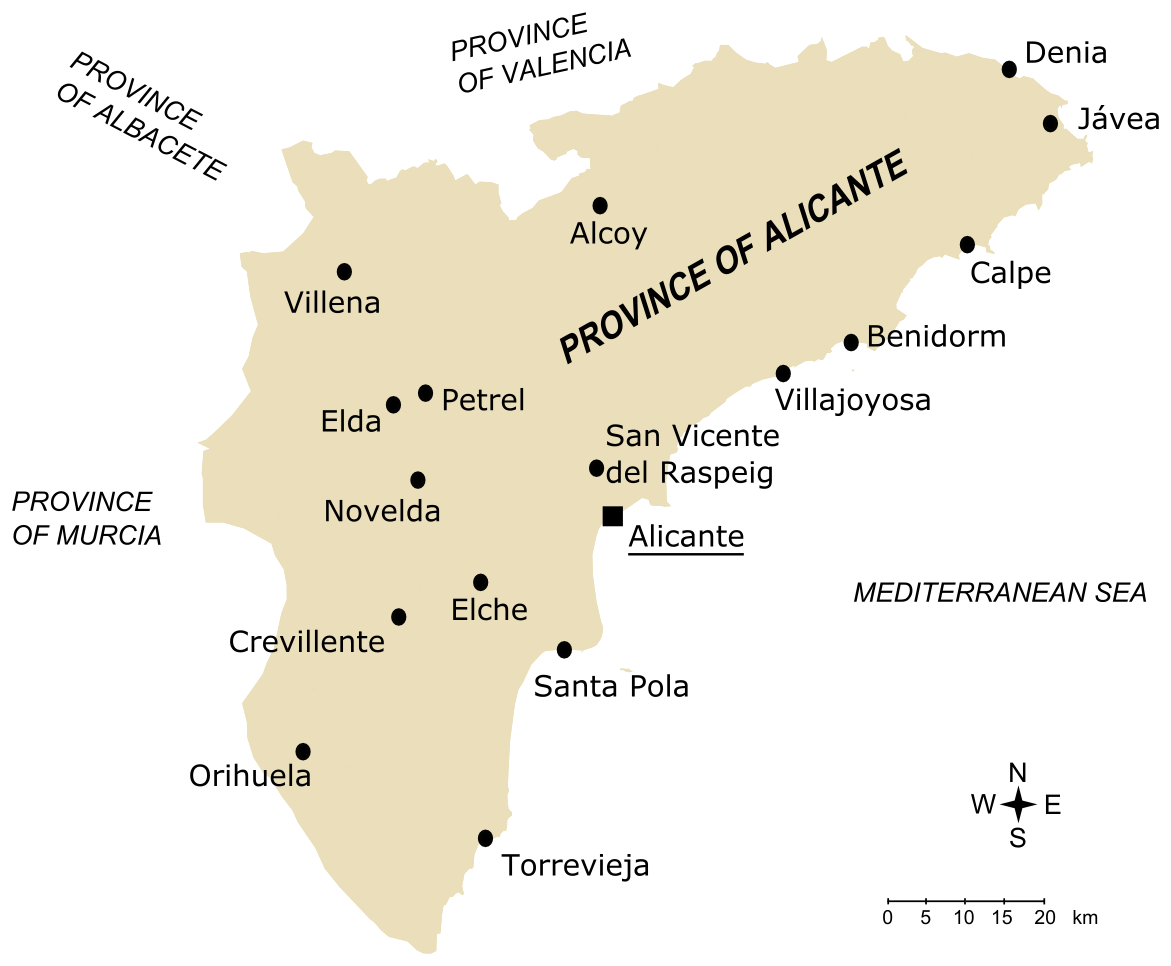
Main towns in the Province of Alicante

The province is mountainous, especially in the north and midwest, whereas it is mostly flat to the south, in the Vega Baja del Segura (Baix Segura) area. The most elevated points in the province are Aitana (1,558 m), Puig Campana (1,410 m), Montcabrer (1,389 m), Carrascar de la Font Roja (1,354 m), Maigmó (1,296 m), Serra de Crevillent (835 m) and El Montgó (753 m). All of these peaks are a part of the Subbaetic Range.

The coast extends from the Cap de la Nau in the north and almost reaches the Mar Menor (Minor Sea) to the south. With regard to water sources, due to the dry rain regime there are no major rivers, but mostly ramblas (dry rivers), which fill in with water when torrential rains occur.

The only remarkable streams are that of the Vinalopó, Serpis and the river Segura. Other minor seasonal creeks (some completely dried out in summer) are Girona, Algar, Amadorio and Ebo.

There are saline wetlands and marshlands along the coast such as El Fondo and former wetlands that are now salt evaporation ponds in Santa Pola and Torrevieja. All of them are key Ramsar Sites which make the Alicante province of high relevance for both migratory and resident seabirds and waterbirds.

Important coastal dunes are present in the Guardamar area which were planted with thousands of pine trees during the 19th century in order to protect the ville from the dunes advancing, which has created now an area of remarkable ecologic value.

The climate is strikingly diverse for its small area. There are three major climates:

- The semi-arid climate predominates in most of the province, roughly going along the coastal plain from La Vila Joiosa through the southernmost border (which includes the cities of Alicante, Elche, Orihuela and Torrevieja). Summers are very long, remarkably hot and dry, while winters are cool and mild. Its most prominent feature is a very scarce precipitation that typically amounts to below 300mm per year and take place mainly during the spring and autumn. The main reason for this lack of rain is the marked rain shadow effect caused by hills to the west of the Alicante province (and, to a lesser degree, those in the northern part, which in turn enhance the inverse Orographic lift effect around Cap de la Nau).

The predominant vegetation native to this part of the province is Matorral Scrublands such as thyme, esparto, rosemary, juniper and the like.

- Proper Mediterranean climate is present in the northeastern areas around Cap de la Nau, mostly to its North, in diminishing grades until disappearing slightly north of Benidorm. It roughly follows the coastal plain from the northern border of the province through the Benidorm area. The northern slopes of the mountains in the Marina Alta comarca have a remarkably wetter microclimate with an average up to 900mm of rain due to the orographic lift. The precipitation in this area is an average of four times larger than in the semiarid South, with this big precipitation gap occurring in a matter of just 100 km (62 mi).

The vegetation on this part of the province is an enriched version of the Matorral shrubland that contains Mediterranean pine woods.

- The Alicante province has a mostly dry Mediterranean to Continental Mediterranean climate. These are the innermost parts of the province (e.g. Villena) and some closer to the sea at a higher elevation (e.g. Alcoy). Winters are cool to cold and a few days of snow are not unusual; summers are mild to hot and rains average a 500mm, slightly more evenly distributed through the year compared to the other areas. The innermost part of this domain is drier, while its mountainous part gets slightly higher precipitation figures which allows Kermes Oak woods to thrive, such as the ones in La Carrasqueta or in the Mariola range, both near Alcoy.

== Politics ==
Alicante has 12 deputies in the Spanish Parliament and with 36 deputies in the Corts Valencianes, the regional Parliament of the Valencian Community.

=== Municipalities ===
The province has 141 municipalities:

- Agost
- Agres
- Aigües
- Alicante
- Albatera
- Alcalalí
- Alcoleja
- Alcosser
- Alcoy
- Alfafara
- L'Alfàs del Pi
- Algorfa
- Algueña
- Almoradí
- Almudaina
- L'Alqueria d'Asnar
- Altea
- Aspe
- L'Atzúbia
- Balones
- Banyeres de Mariola
- Benasau
- Beneixama
- Benejúzar
- Benferri
- Beniarbeig
- Beniardà
- Beniarrés
- Benidoleig
- Benidorm
- Benifallim
- Benifato
- Benigembla
- Benijófar
- Benilloba
- Benillup
- Benimantell
- Benimarfull
- Benimassot
- Benimeli
- Benissa
- Biar
- Bigastro
- Bolulla
- Busot
- Callosa de Segura
- Callosa d'en Sarrià
- Calpe
- El Campello
- Campo de Mirra
- Cañada
- Castalla
- Castell de Castells
- El Castell de Guadalest
- Catral
- Cocentaina
- Confrides
- Cox
- Crevillent
- Daya Nueva
- Daya Vieja
- Dénia
- Dolores
- Elda
- Elche
- Fageca
- Famorca
- Finestrat
- El Fondó de les Neus
- Formentera del Segura
- Gaianes
- Gata de Gorgos
- Gorga
- Granja de Rocamora
- Guardamar del Segura
- Hondón de los Frailes
- Ibi
- Jacarilla
- Llíber
- Millena
- Monforte del Cid
- Monòver
- Los Montesinos
- Murla
- Muro de Alcoy
- Mutxamel
- Novelda
- La Nucia
- Ondara
- Onil
- Orba
- Orihuela
- L'Orxa / Lorcha
- Orxeta
- Parcent
- Pedreguer
- Pego
- Penàguila
- Petrer
- Pilar de la Horadada
- El Pinós / Pinoso
- Planes
- El Poble Nou de Benitatxell / Benitachell
- Els Poblets
- Polop
- Quatretondeta
- Rafal
- El Ràfol d'Almúnia
- Redován
- Relleu
- Rojales
- La Romana
- Sagra
- Salinas
- San Fulgencio
- San Isidro
- San Miguel de Salinas
- Sanet y Negrals
- Sant Joan d'Alacant
- San Vicente del Raspeig
- Santa Pola
- Sax
- Sella
- Senija
- Tàrbena
- Teulada
- Tibi
- Tollos
- Tormos
- La Torre de les Maçanes / Torremanzanas
- Torrevieja
- La Vall d'Alcalà
- La Vall d'Ebo
- La Vall de Gallinera
- La Vall de Laguar
- El Verger
- Villajoyosa
- Villena
- Xàbia
- Jalón
- Xixona / Jijona

=== Comarcas ===
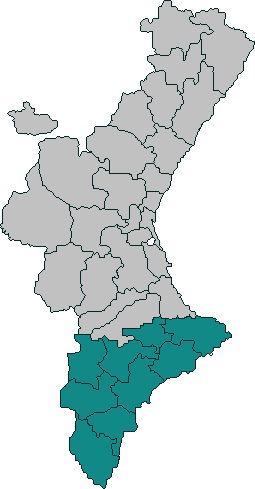
Alicante province in the Valencian Community. Map subdivided according to the historical divisions.

Traditionally, Alicante province is divided into nine comarcas or comarques (in Valencian):

- Alacantí: 487,113 inhabitants (2019); its capital is Alicante; services and tourism; highly urbanised comarca; Bonfires of Saint John festival.
- Alcoià: It is subdivided into two clearly differentiated subcomarcas:
  - Valls d'Alcoi or Valle de Alcoy: 66,459 inhabitants (2019); its capital is Alcoy/Alcoi; olive trees and textile industry; Moros i Cristians festivals.
  - Foia de Castalla or Hoya de Castalla: 42,734 inhabitants (2019); its capital is Castalla; its most populous city is Ibi; industry of toys.
- Comtat: 28,096 inhabitants (2019); its capital is Cocentaina; textile industry and agriculture.
- Marina Alta: 175,156 inhabitants (2019); its capital is Dénia; it is the most rainy comarca; tourism.
- Marina Baixa or Marina Baja: 188,623 inhabitants (2019); its capital is Benidorm; eminently tourist; beaches and mountains.
- Vega Baja del Segura or Baix Segura: 355,257 inhabitants (2019); its capital is Orihuela; its most populous city is Torrevieja; agriculture and tourism.
- Alt Vinalopó or Alto Vinalopó: 52,401 inhabitants (2019); its capital is Villena; agriculture and footwear; Moros i Cristians festivals.
- Vinalopó Mitjà or Vinalopó Medio: 169,069 inhabitants (2019); its capital is Elda; footwear industry, marble, wines and grapes.
- Baix Vinalopó or Bajo Vinalopó: 293,775 inhabitants (2019); its capital is Elche/Elx; agriculture, footwear and carpet industry, tourism; Misteri d'Elx (Elche's Mystery) festival and services with Alicante–Elche Airport in the municipality of Elche/Elx.

== Demographics ==
Historical population
Year	Pop.	±%
1842	313,773	—
1857	378,958	+20.8%
1877	415,204	+9.6%
1887	436,500	+5.1%
1900	474,723	+8.8%
1910	512,634	+8.0%
1920	526,335	+2.7%
1930	553,669	+5.2%
1940	607,949	+9.8%
1950	634,632	+4.4%
1960	718,213	+13.2%
1970	922,027	+28.4%
1981	1,149,181	+24.6%
1991	1,292,563	+12.5%
2001	1,461,925	+13.1%
2011	1,852,166	+26.7%
2021	1,887,036	+1.9%
Source: INE

As of 2025, the population is 2,033,566, of which 49.5% are male, and 50.5% are female. Minors make up 16.6% of the population, and seniors make up 21.0%.

Out of the 50 provinces of Spain, Alicante is the only one with three metropolitan areas: Alicante–Elche, Elda–Petrer and Benidorm, even though only Alicante–Elche is ranked within the Spanish top ten metropolitan areas.

=== Immigration ===
As of 2025, the Province of Alicante has the highest share of immigrants out of all Spanish provinces, as they make up 29.2% of the population. The 5 largest foreign countries of birth are Colombia, the United Kingdom, Morocco, Ukraine, and Argentina.

== Economy ==
The main industries in Alicante province are, in the primary sector, intensive agriculture, especially in the fertile Vega Baja del Segura, Camp d'Elx (Elche's countryside) and vineyards in the inner part of the province (Monforte, Novelda, Pinós), also near the coast in the Marina Alta area. Fishing is important all along the coast, with important fishing harbours such as Santa Pola, Calp or Dénia.

Industry has been historically important in the textile sector around Alcoy. Footwear still remains as the flagship industrial sector of the province, which occurs in Elche, Elda, Petrer and Villena, both labour-intensive footwear and, specially, textile are at a low ebb due to harsh competition from fast pace growing economies in Asia. The traditionally important toys industry around the Ibi and Onil area is another one competing internationally with those same areas.

A sector which has gained preeminence during the last 20 years is marble quarrying and processing, it happens mostly in the Novelda and Pinós area.

Still, what the province is known for is its massive tourism sector. The Costa Blanca's generally mild and sunny weather attracts millions of tourists from other European countries such as the Netherlands, the UK and Ireland, Germany, Belgium, Norway or France and also from other parts in Spain like Madrid. Thousands of families from other places own a second home in the Alicante province which they use for their vacation time.

== Museums ==
Alcoy:

- Archaeological Museum Camil Visedo
- Museu Alcoià de la Festa
- Firefighters Museum of Alcoy
- Shelter of Cervantes

Alicante:

- Alicante Museum of Contemporary Art
- Archaeological Museum of Alicante
- Gravina Museum of Fine Arts

== Celebrations ==
- Moors and Christians of Alcoy
- Bonfires of Saint John
- Mystery Play of Elche
- Moros y cristianos

== Gallery ==
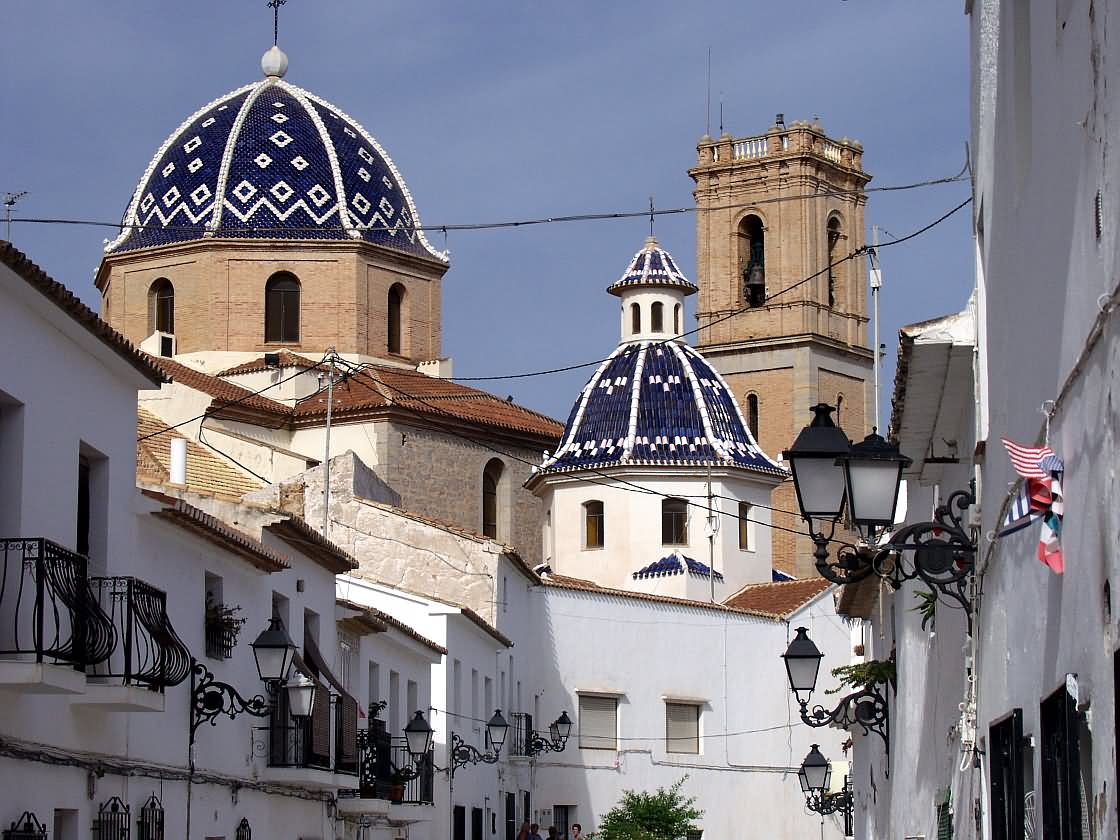
La Mare de Déu del Consol in Altea

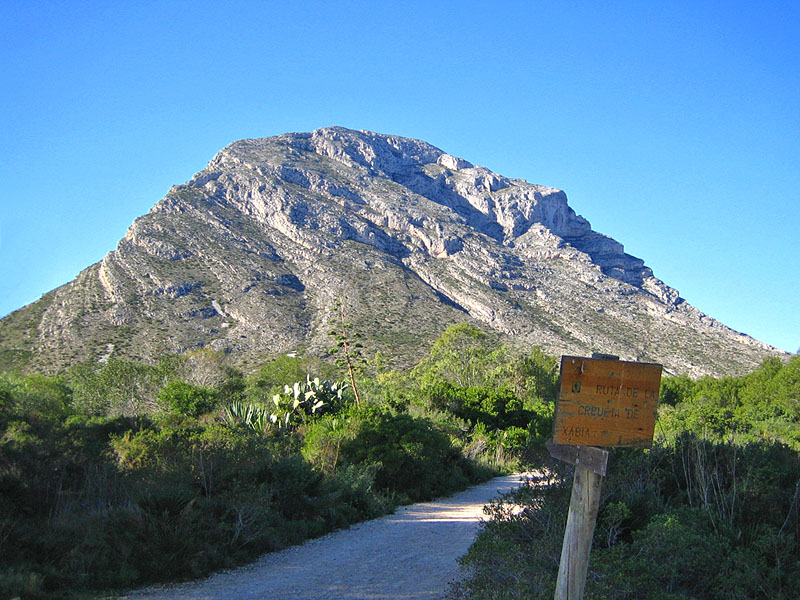
Montgó massif from Cap de Sant Antoni, Xàbia

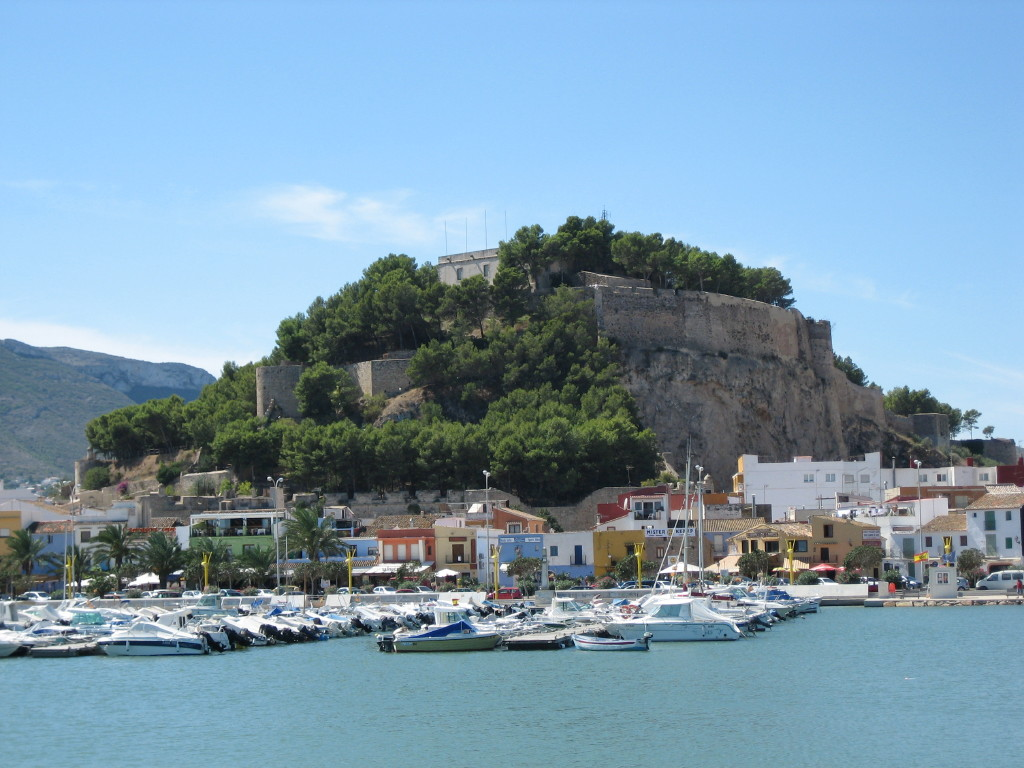
The Castle in Dénia

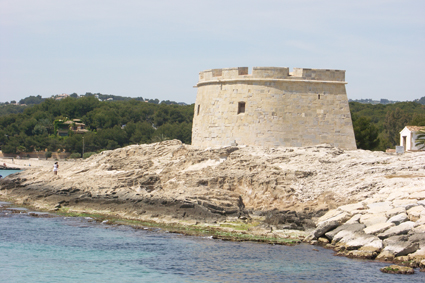
The Castle in Moraira

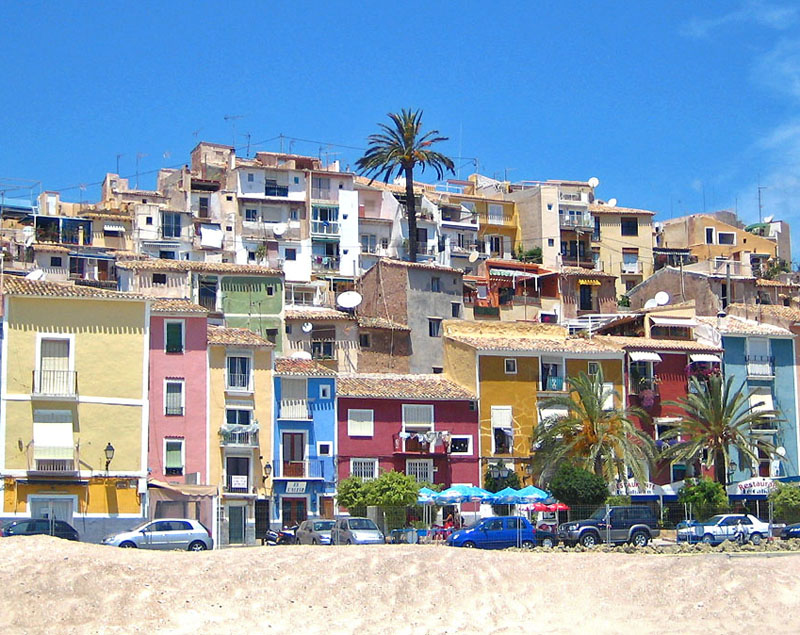
Beachfront in Villajoyosa

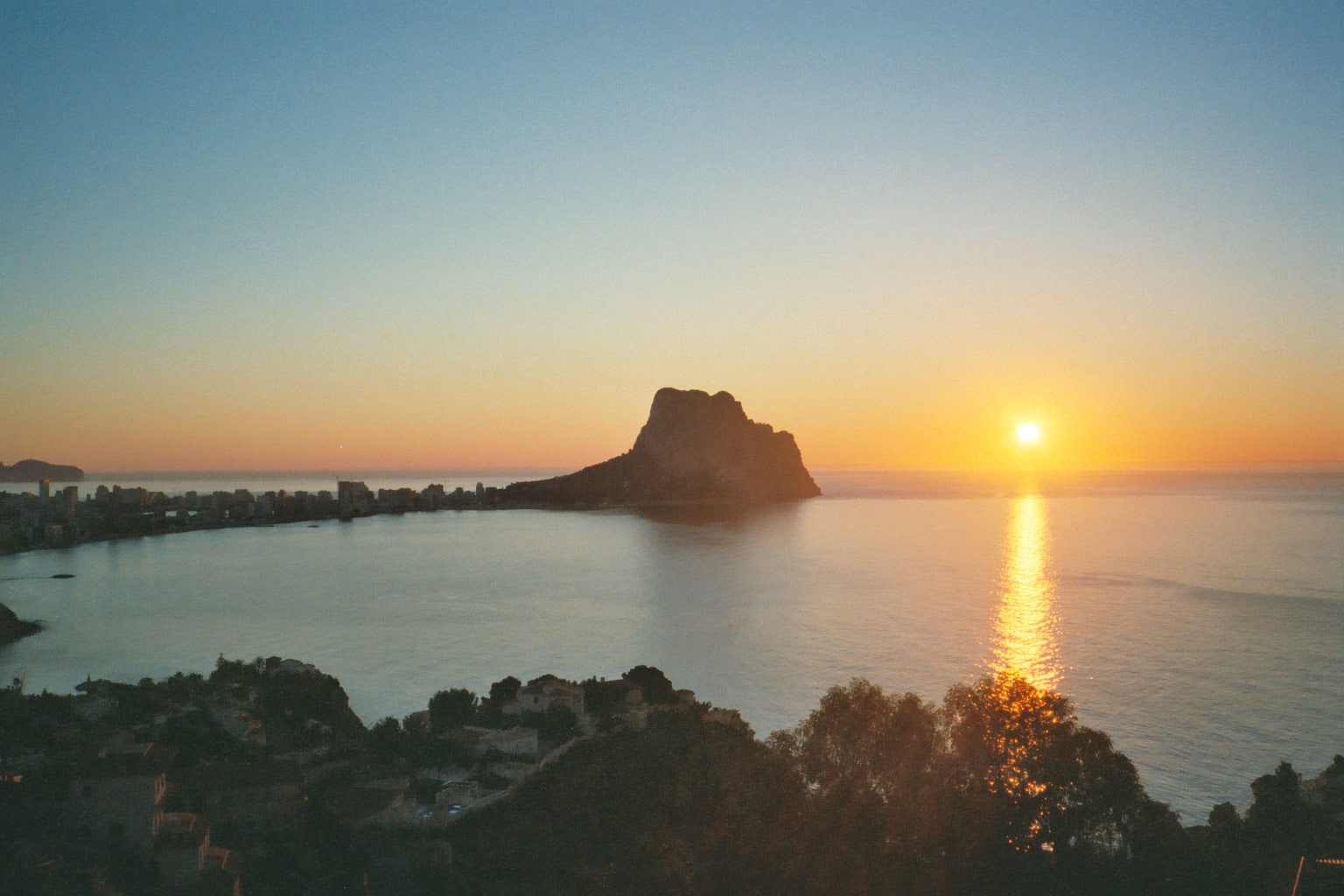
View of the Ifach atoll in Calp

The Palmeral of Elche

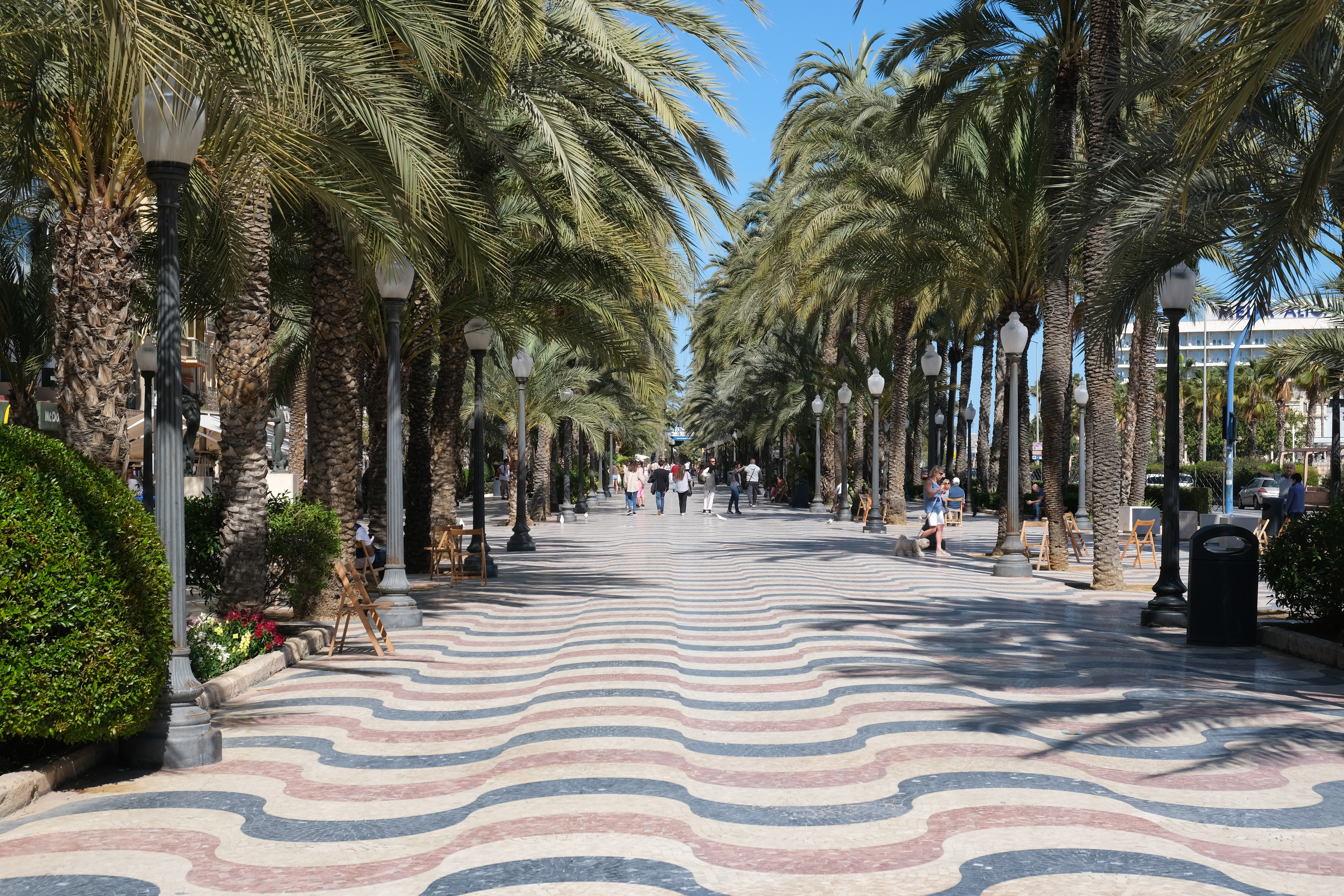
The Esplanade of Spain promenade in Alicante

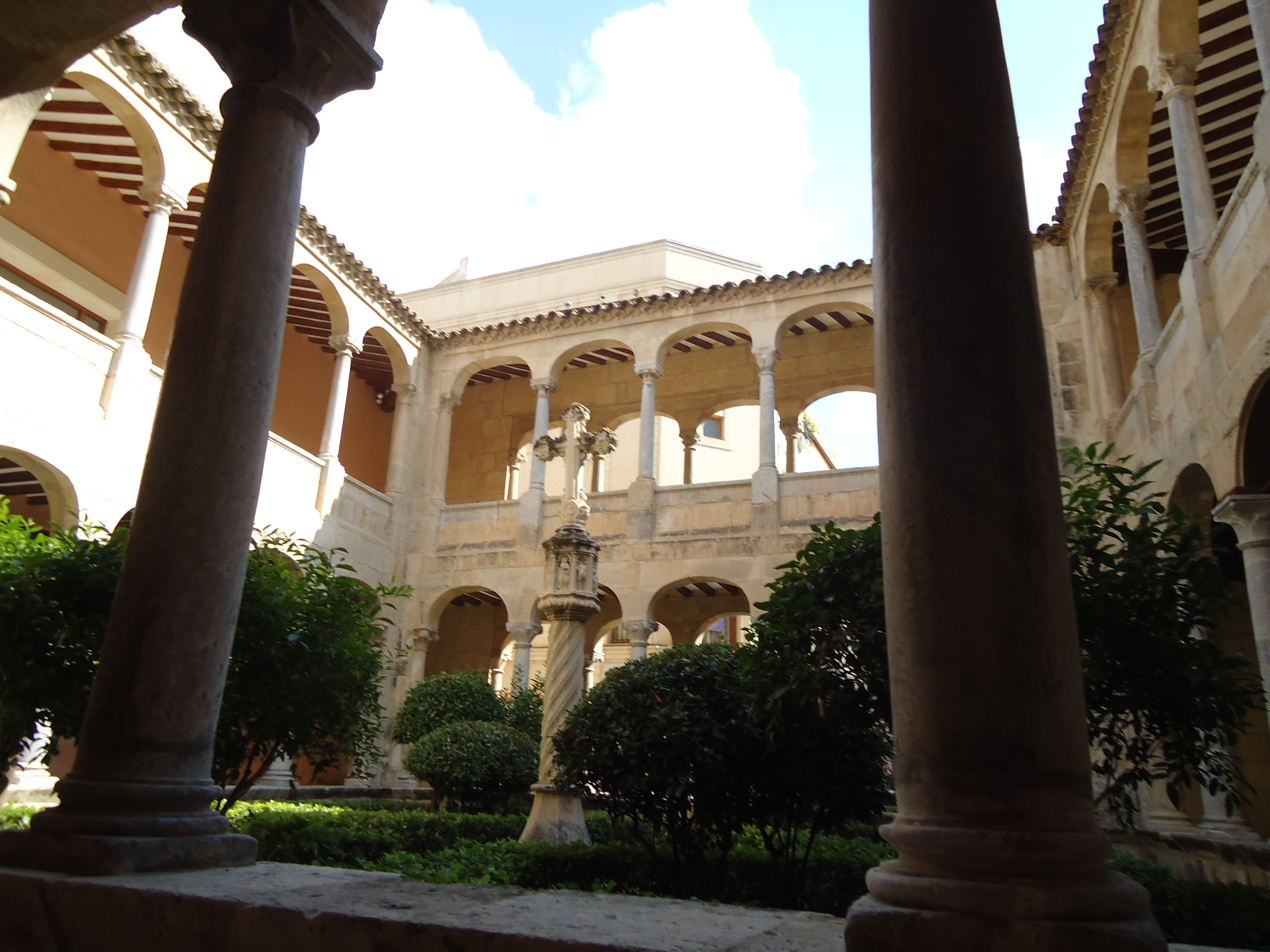
The Cathedral in Orihuela

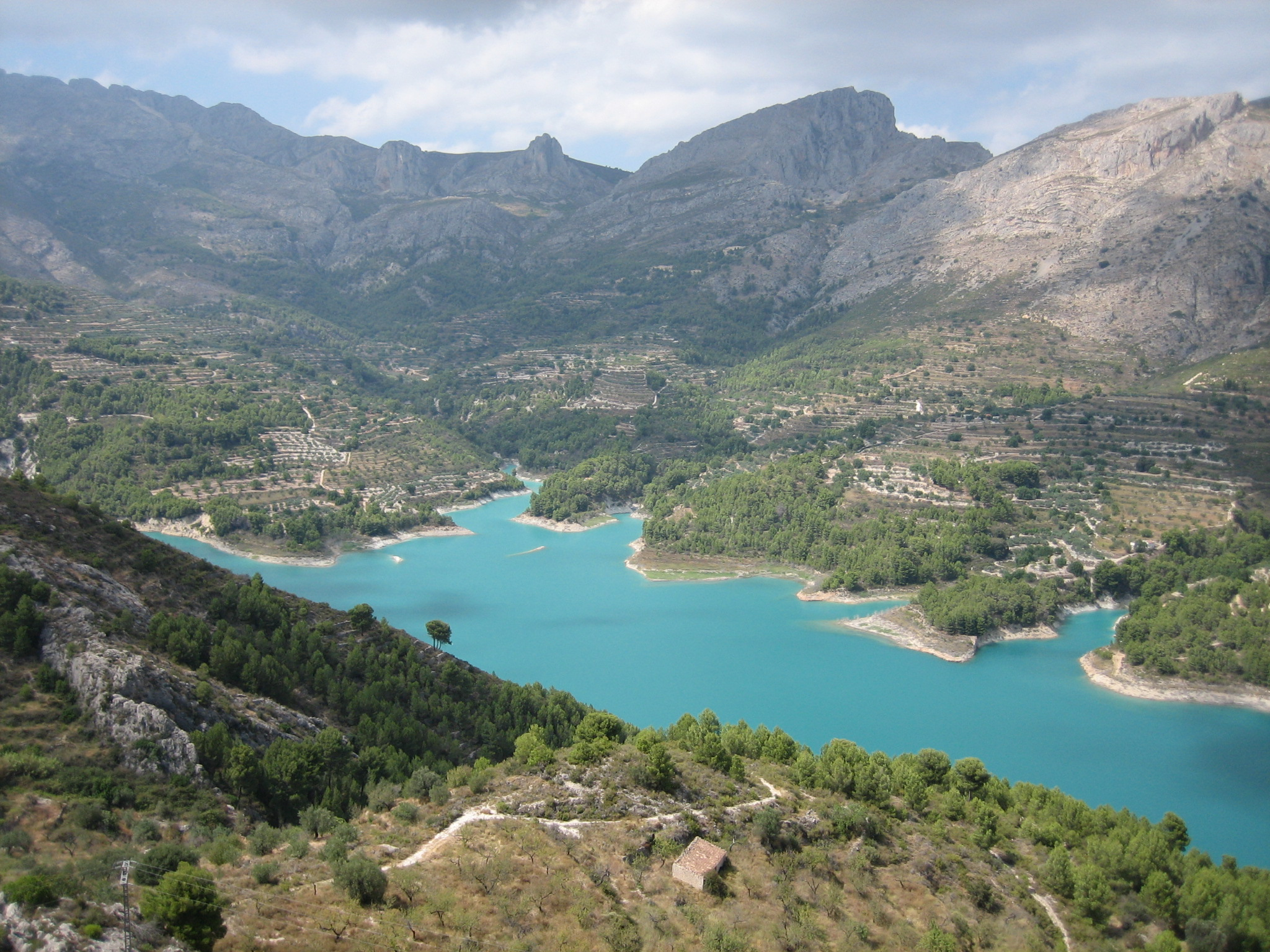
The Guadalest Reservoir

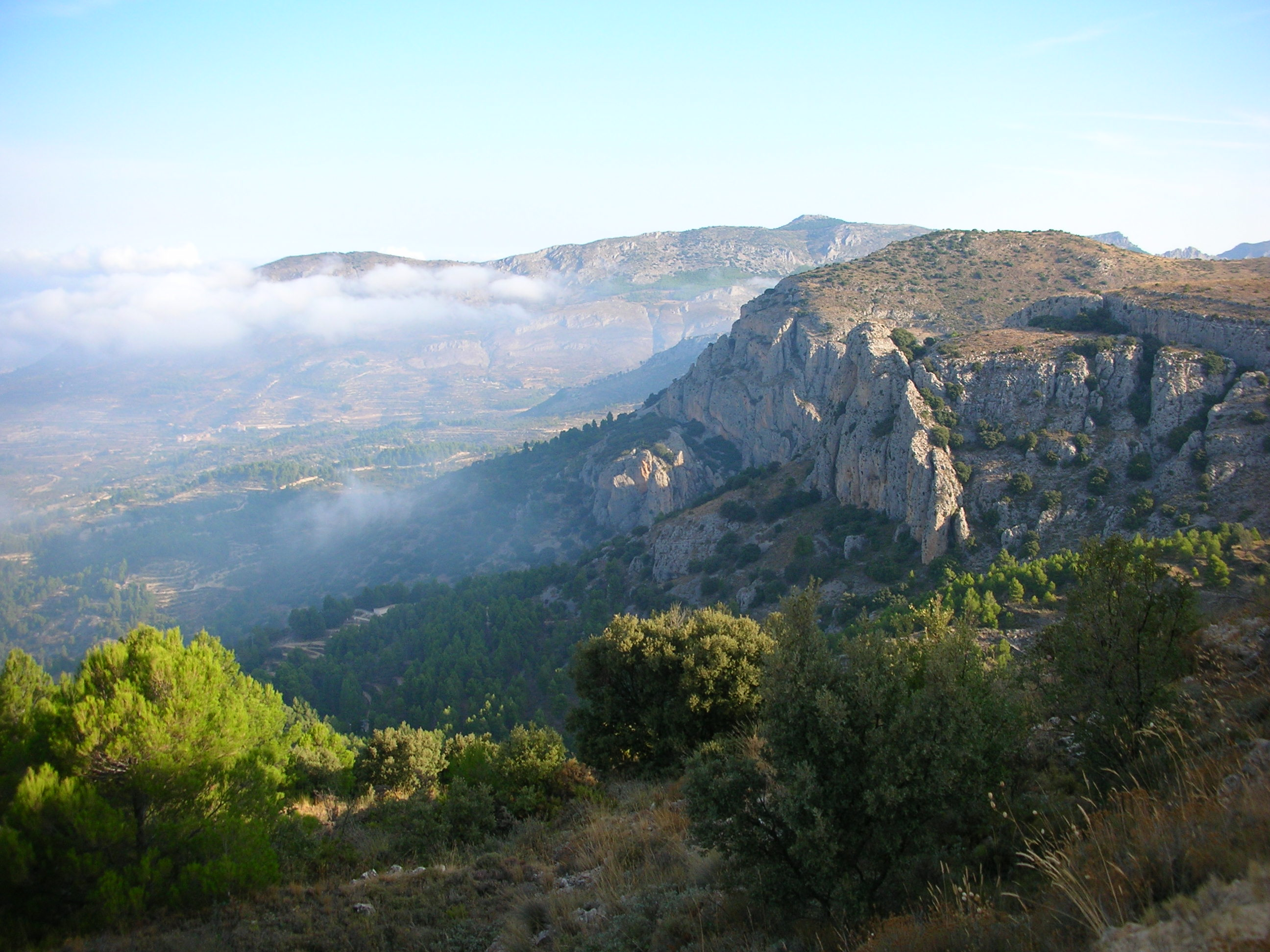
The Aitana, the highest peak of Alicante's Prebaetic System

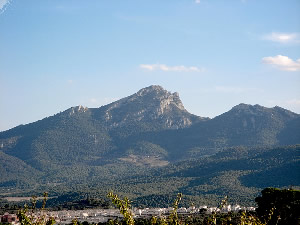
The Maigmó Peak

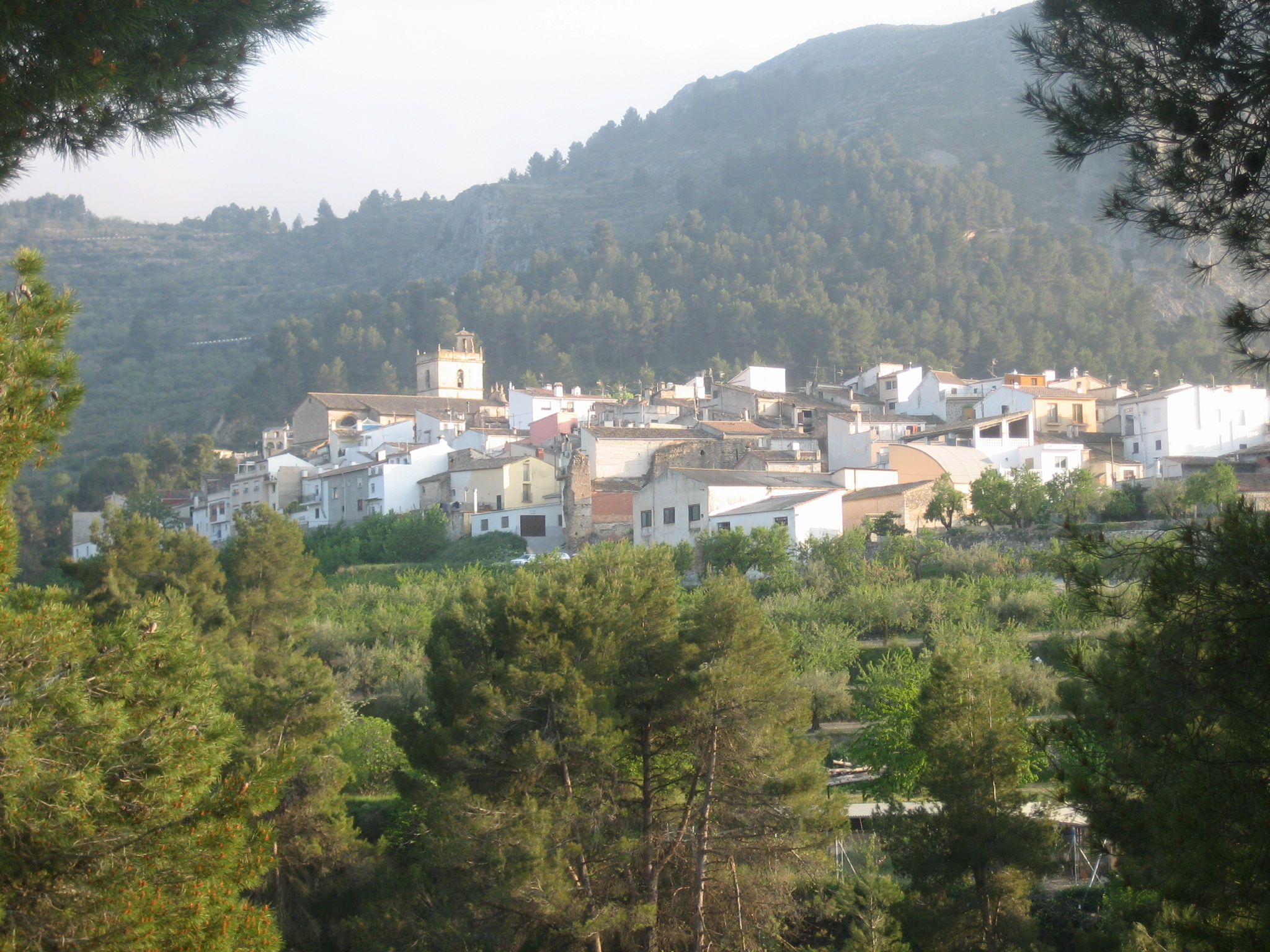
Penàguila in the comarca of Alcoià

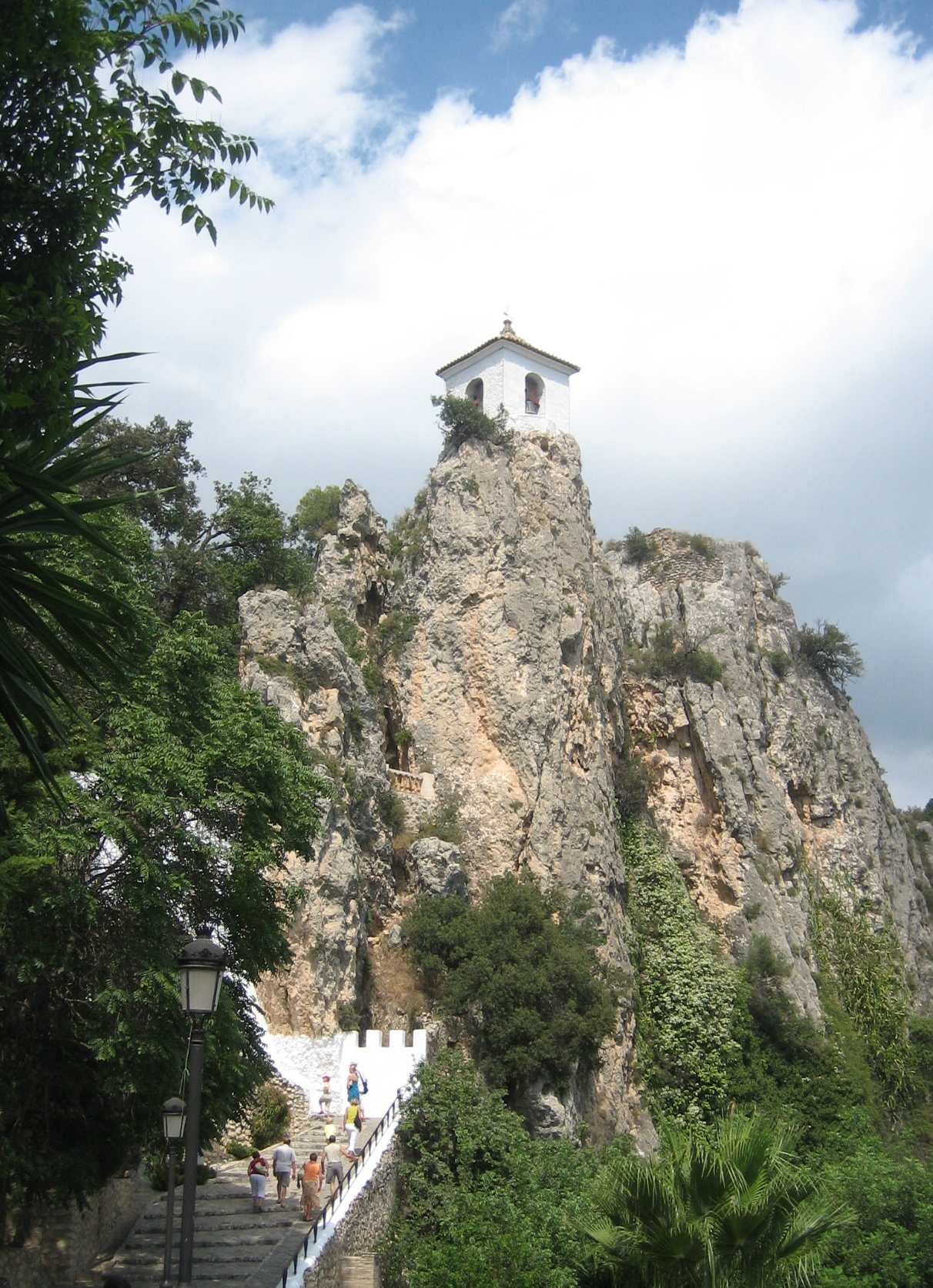
The tourist town of Guadalest

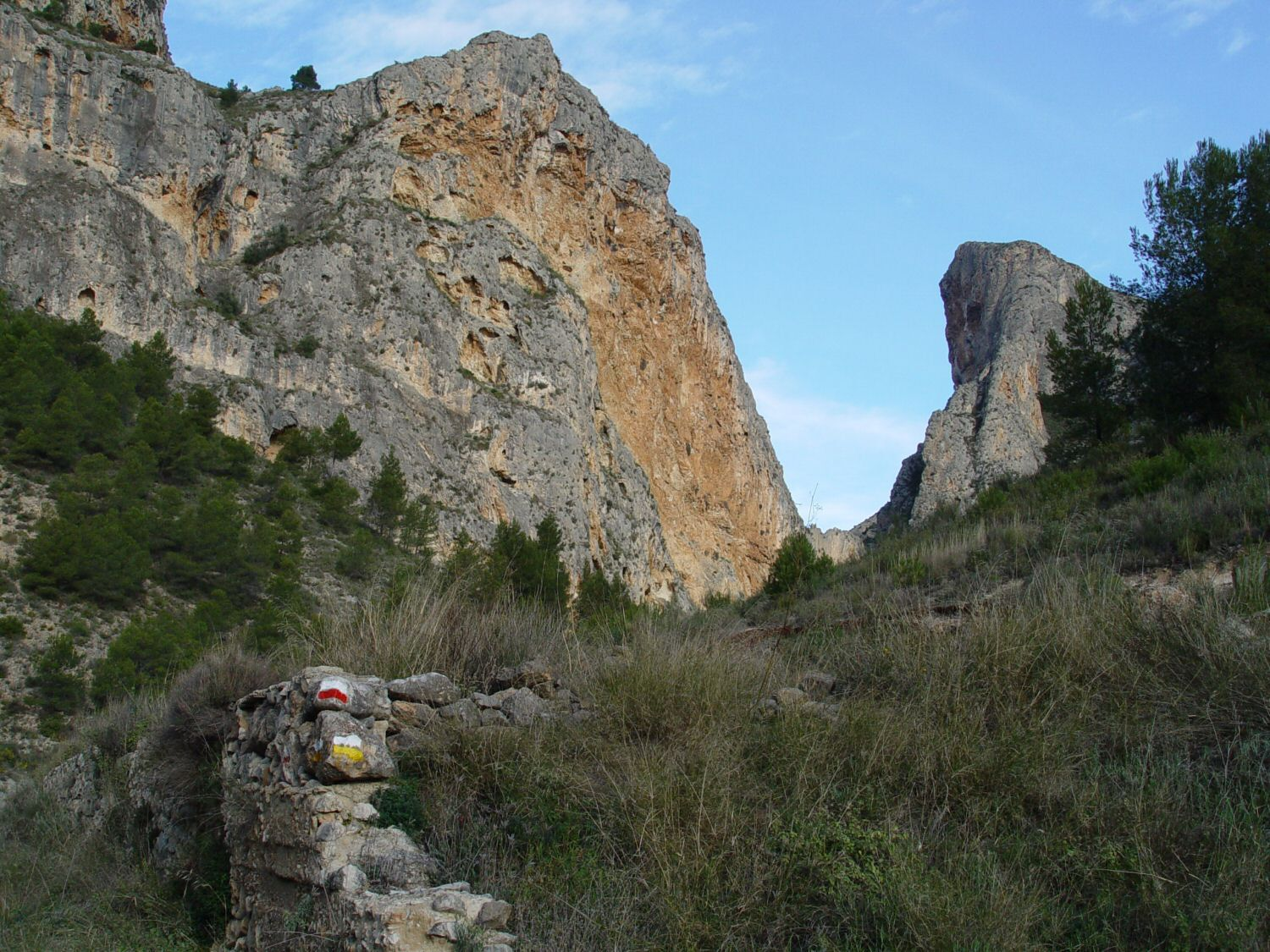
Barranc del Sinc in the Serra Mariola.

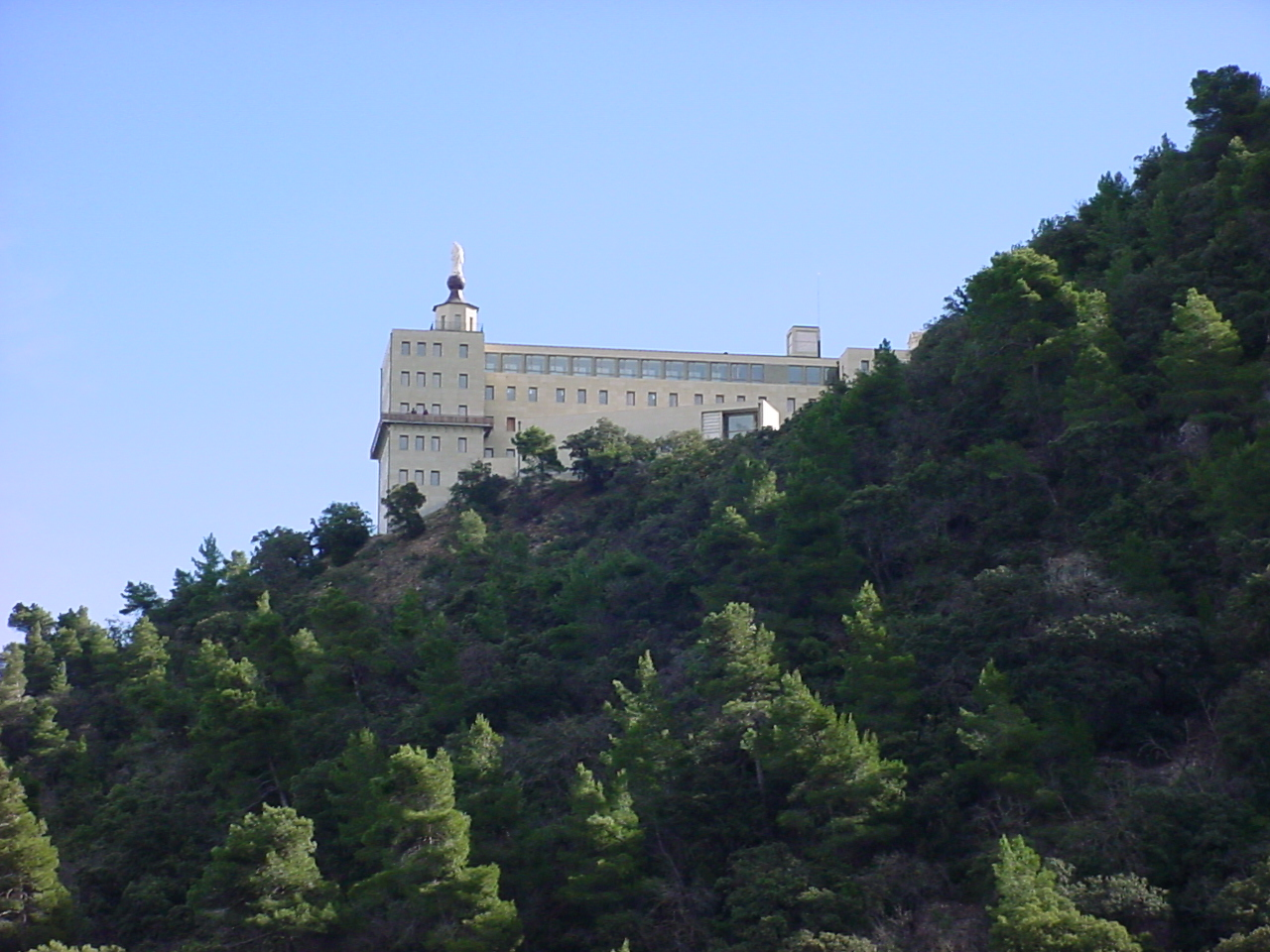
Font Roja shrine.

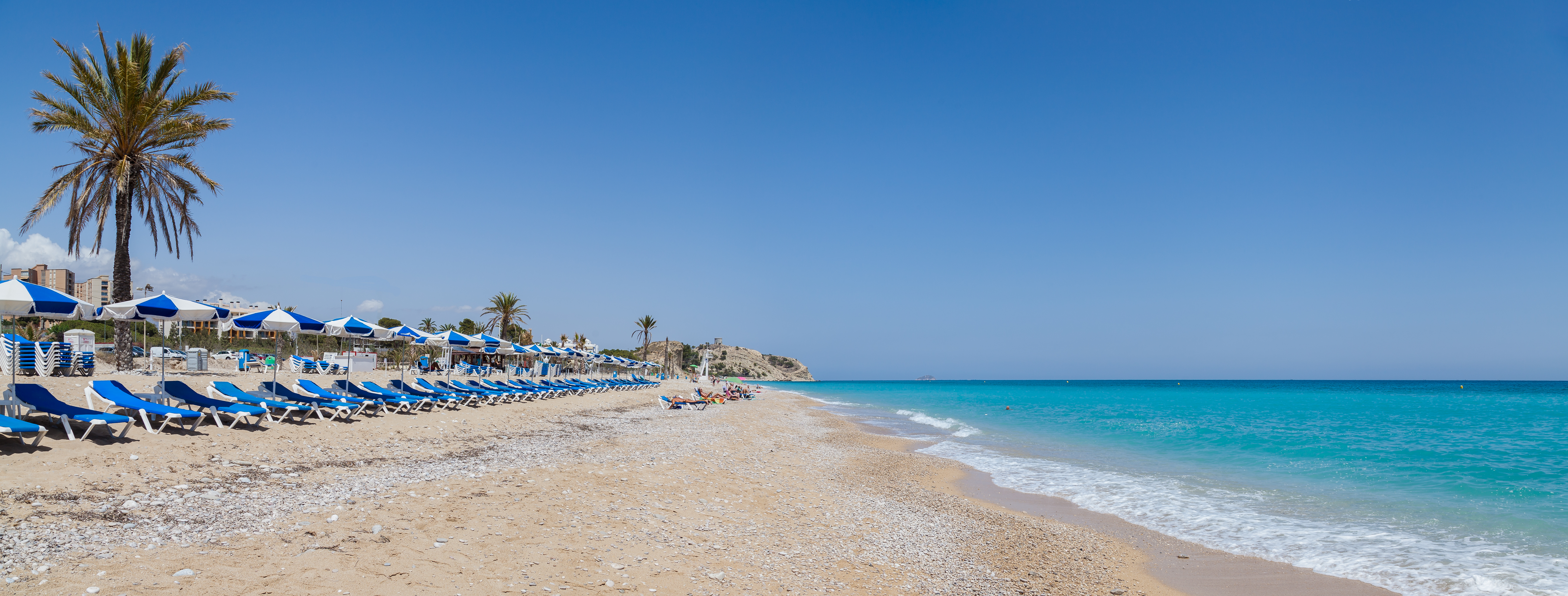
Paradise Beach in Villajoyosa.

== See also ==
- Alicante (Spanish Congress Electoral District)
- Suma Gestión Tributaria (Alicante Administration Body)
- Route of the Castles of Vinalopó
