= San Vicente del Raspeig, Spain =

San Vicente del Raspeig Sant Vicent del Raspeig
- City and municipality
- Sant Vicent del Raspeig / San Vicente del Raspeig (official)
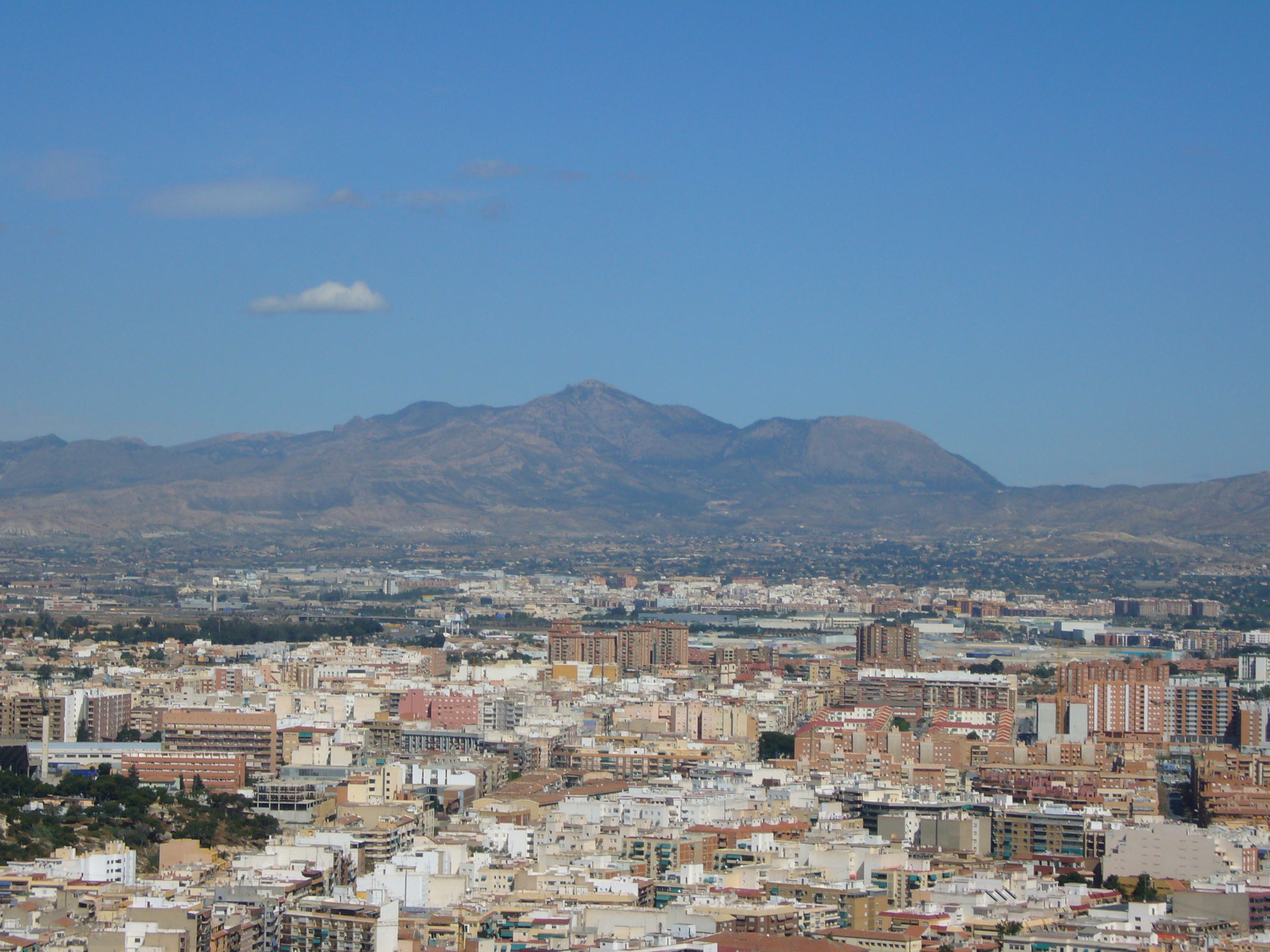

- Flag Coat of arms
- Motto: Sequet però sanet (Dry but healthy)
- Location within Province of Alicante Location within Valencian Community Location within Spain
- Coordinates: 38°23′47″N 0°31′31″W
- Country: Spain
- Autonomous community: Valencian Community
- Province: Alacant / Alicante
- Comarca: Alacantí
- Judicial district: Sant Vicent del Raspeig / San Vicente del Raspeig

Government
  - Alcalde (Mayor): José Rafael Pascual Llopis (2023) (PPCV)

Area
  - Total: 40.55 km^{2} (15.66 sq mi)
- Elevation: 109 m (358 ft)
- Highest elevation: 440 m (1,440 ft)
- Lowest elevation: 85 m (279 ft)

Population (2016)
  - Total: 56,715
  - Density: 1,399/km^{2} (3,622/sq mi)
- Demonyms: • santvicenter, -a (Val.) • sanvicentero/a (Sp.)
- Official language(s): Valencian; Spanish
- Linguistic area: Valencian
- Time zone: UTC+1 (CET)
  - Summer (DST): UTC+2 (CEST)
- Postal code: 03690–03699
- Dialing code: +34 (ES) 96 (A)
- Website: Official website

San Vicente del Raspeig, (Note: Pronunciation of San Vicente del Raspeig: Spanish: [sam biˈθente ðel rasˈpetʃ]) in Spanish, or Sant Vicent del Raspeig, (Note: Pronunciation of Sant Vicent del Raspeig: Valencian: [ˈsaɱ viˈsɛn del rasˈpetʃ]) in Valencian (officially: Sant Vicent del Raspeig / San Vicente del Raspeig), known simply as San Vicente or Sant Vicent, is a municipality located in the comarca of Alacantí, in the province of Alicante, Spain, inside the conurbation of Alicante city (6 km away and connected by bus routes and tram). It has an area of 40.5 km² and according to the 2007 census, a total population of 55.434 inhabitants, with a large student population because it contains part of the University of Alicante (Universitat d'Alacant), a major educational institution.

The town was founded in 1836 with the motto sequet però sanet ("dry but healthy"), but it was not considered a municipality until 1848.

There are two important festivals every year: the Bonfires called Fogueres de Sant Vicent in July, and the festival of Moros i Cristians in late April.

The city has many quarries of limestone that enable the existence of cement factories.

== Notable people ==
- Juanma Acevedo, footballer

== Twin towns ==
San Vicente del Raspeig is twinned with:

- L'Isle-d'Abeau, France
