= Aigües =

Aigües Aguas de Busot
- Municipality
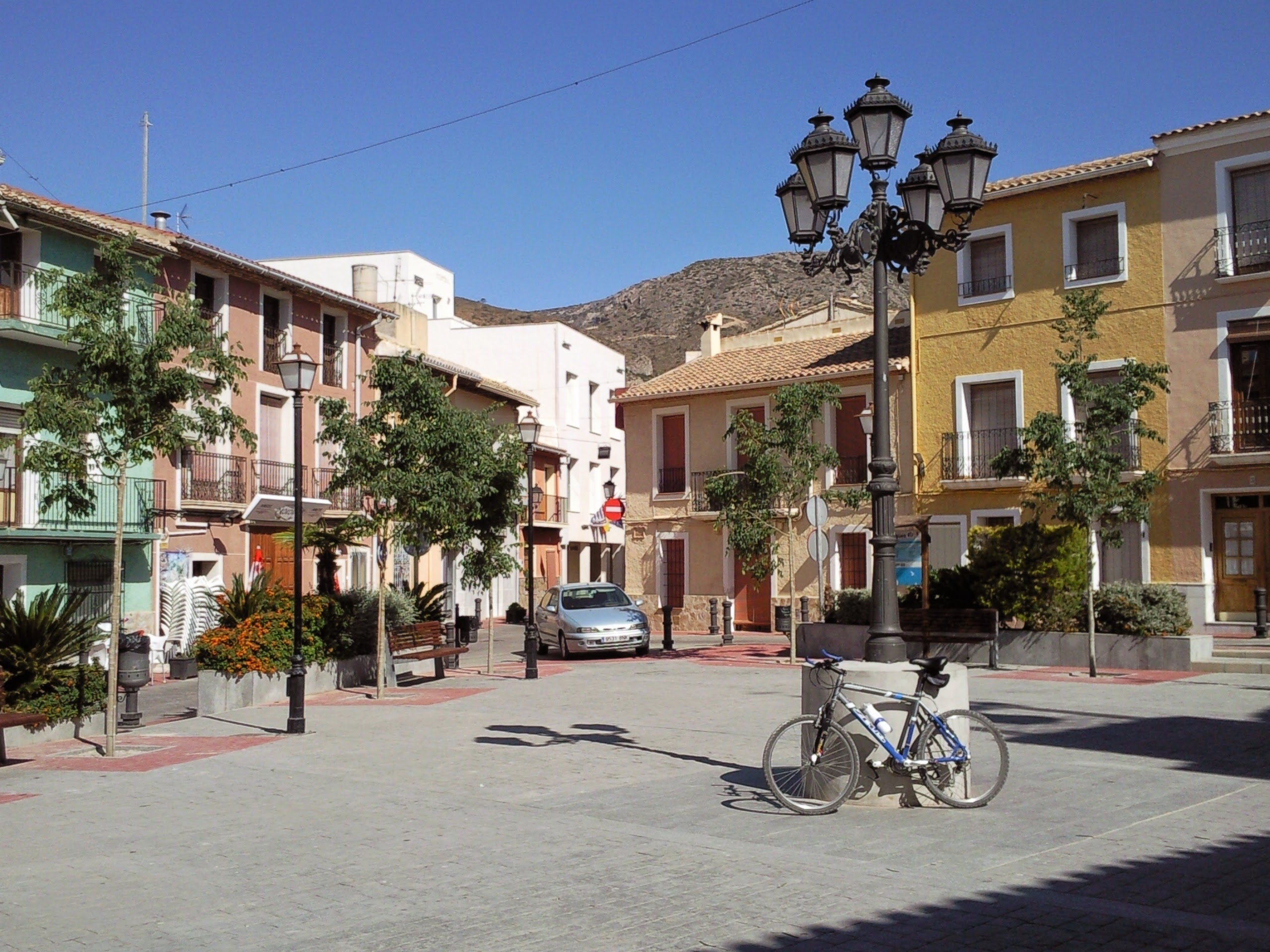
- Aigües

- Flag Coat of arms

- Location in Spain
- Coordinates: 38°29′56″N 0°21′46″W
- Country: Spain
- Autonomous community: Valencian Community
- Province: Alicante
- Comarca: Alacantí
- Judicial district: San Vicente del Raspeig

Government
  - Alcalde: Mª Pilar Sol Cortés (2007) (PP)

Area
  - Total: 18.47 km^{2} (7.13 sq mi)
- Elevation: 341 m (1,119 ft)

Population (2025-01-01)
  - Total: 1,199
  - Density: 64.92/km^{2} (168.1/sq mi)
- Demonyms: Aigüer, aigüera
- Time zone: UTC+1 (CET)
  - Summer (DST): UTC+2 (CEST)
- Postal code: 03569
- Official language(s): Valencian

Aigües (Valencian: [ˈajɣwes], Spanish: Aguas de Busot [ˈaɣwas ðe βuˈsot]) is a municipality in the comarca of Alacantí in the Valencian Community, Spain.
