= Mutxamel =

Mutxamel Muchamiel
- Town and municipality
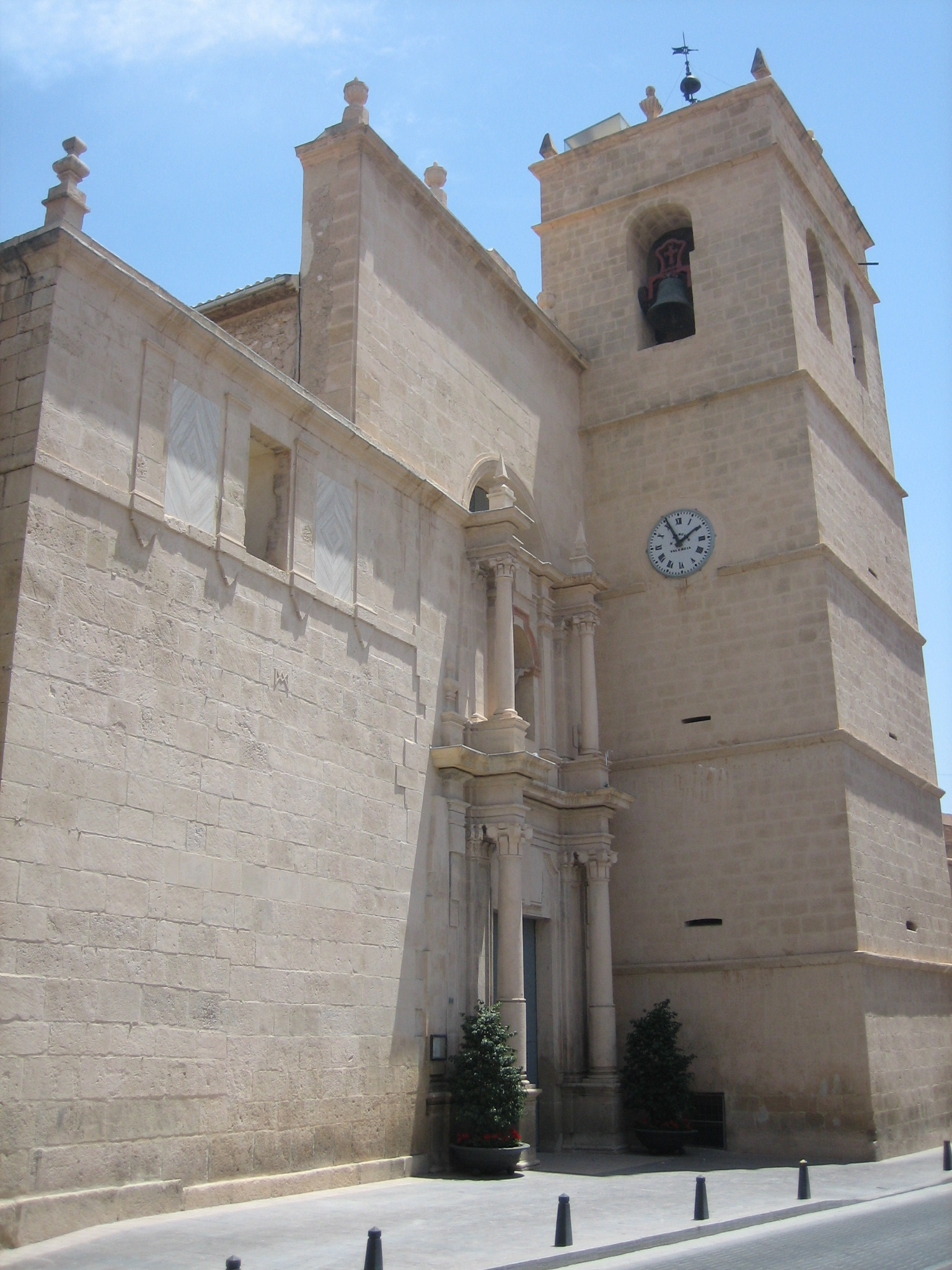
- Church of The Holy Saviour

- Coat of arms

- Location in Spain Mutxamel (Valencian Community) Mutxamel (Spain)
- Coordinates: 38°24′49″N 0°26′44″W
- Country: Spain
- Autonomous community: Valencia
- Province: Alicante
- Comarca: Alacantí
- Judicial district: Sant Vicent del Raspeig

Government
  - Alcalde (Mayor): Rafael García Berenguer (2023) (PP)

Area
  - Total: 47.67 km^{2} (18.41 sq mi)
- Elevation: 63 m (207 ft)

Population (2025-01-01)
  - Total: 28,621
  - Density: 600.4/km^{2} (1,555/sq mi)
- Demonyms: • mutxameler, -a (Val.) • muchamelero/a (Sp.)
- Official language(s): Valencian; Spanish
- Linguistic area: Valencian
- Time zone: UTC+1 (CET)
  - Summer (DST): UTC+2 (CEST)
- Postal code: 03110

Mutxamel, (Note: Pronunciation of Mutxamel: Valencian: [mutʃaˈmɛl]) in Valencian (known in Spanish as Muchamiel), (Note: Pronunciation of Muchamiel (unofficial): Spanish: [mutʃaˈmjel]) is a town and municipality in the comarca of Alacantí, Alicante, Valencian Community, Spain.
