= Sant Joan d'Alacant =

Sant Joan d'Alacant San Juan de Alicante
- Town and municipality
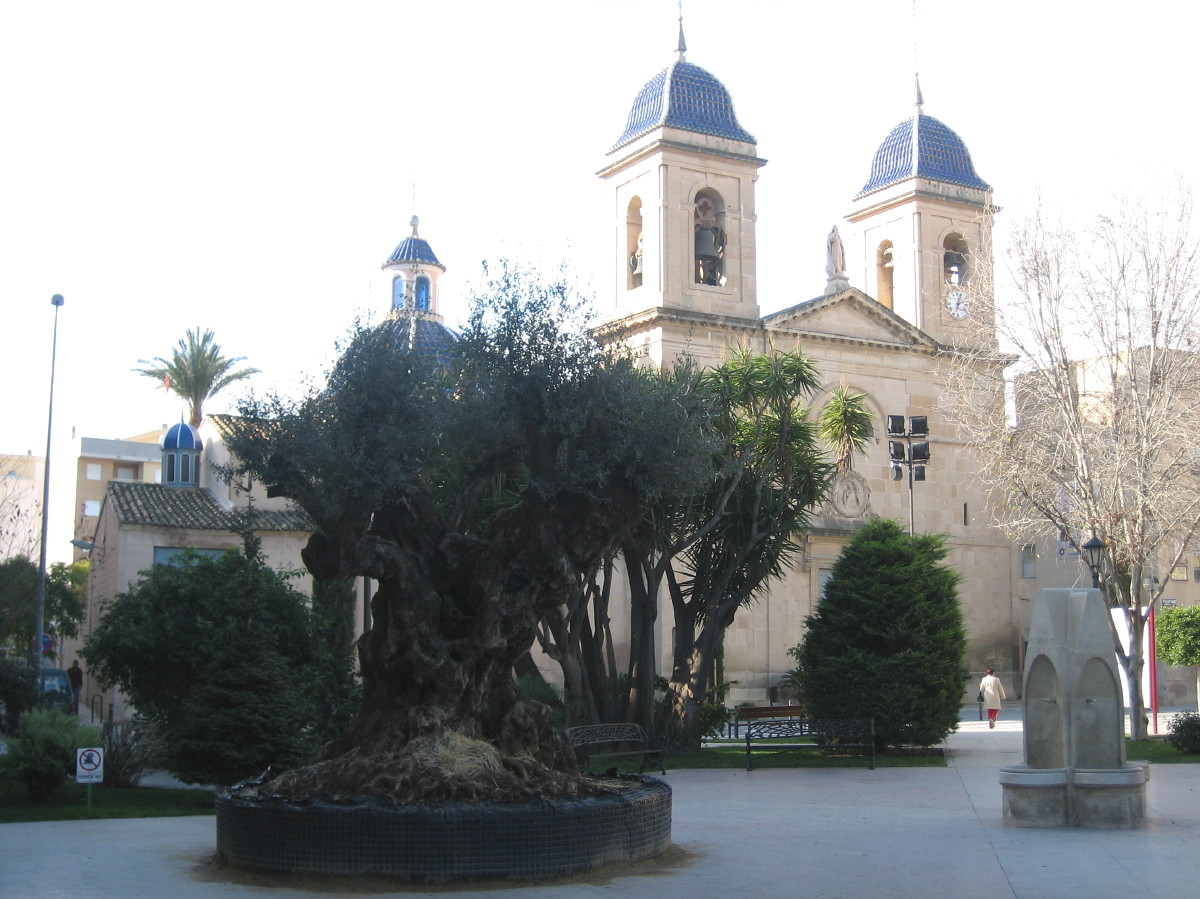
- Plaça d'Espanya

- Coat of arms
- Location of Sant Joan d'Alacant
- Location within Province of Alicante Location within Valencian Community Location within Spain
- Coordinates: 38°24′05″N 0°26′12″W
- Country: Spain
- Autonomous Community: Valencian Community
- Province: Alacant / Alicante
- Comarca: Alacantí
- Entities: 2 entitats: Sant Joan (poble); Benimagrell

Government
  - Alcalde (Mayor): Santiago Román Gomez (Ind.)

Area
  - Total: 9.64 km^{2} (3.72 sq mi)
- Elevation (AMSL): 40 m (130 ft)

Population (2023)
  - Total: 25,275
  - Density: 2,620/km^{2} (6,790/sq mi)
- Demonyms: • santjoaner, -a (Val.) • sanjuanero, -a (Sp.)
- Official language(s): Valencian; Spanish
- Linguistic area: Valencian
- Time zone: UTC+1 (CET)
  - Summer (DST): UTC+2 (CEST)
- Postal code: 03550
- Area code: +34 (ES) + 96 (A)
- Website: www.santjoandalacant.es

Sant Joan d'Alacant, (Note: Pronunciation of Sant Joan d'Alacant: Valencian: [ˌsaɲ dʒuˈan dalaˈkant]) in Valencian (known in Spanish as San Juan de Alicante), (Note: Pronunciation of San Juan de Alicante: Spanish: [saŋ xwan de aliˈkante]) or simply Sant Joan (or San Juan), is a town and municipality belonging to Alicante (Alacant) metropolitan area, in the southeast of Valencian Community, Spain. It is the geographic centre of the Old Garden of Alicante. Its limits are with the settled areas of Alicante (7 km), Mutxamel (1 km) and El Campello (3 km). It is within the Alicante metropolitan area and shares the same fire department and metro services. Its population growth is due to its function as a bedroom community, as well as in recent years, its isolation from tourist areas, its cultural and academic activities, and because has part of the campus of the University Miguel Hernández of Elche (Elx). It comprises two zones: the town of Sant Joan (Sant Joan Poble) and Benimagrell, which is now joined through its urban expansion.

As of the register of 2023, the population is 25,275.
