= Frailes, Spain =

Frailes
- Municipality
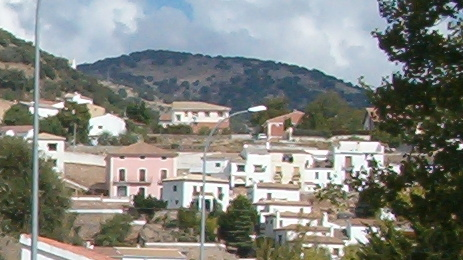

- Coat of arms

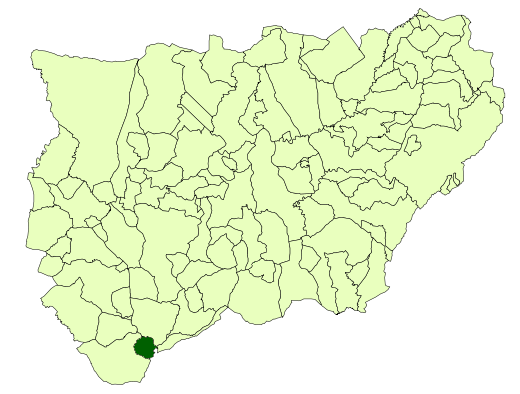

- Location in the Province of Jaén Frailes, Spain (Andalusia) Frailes, Spain (Spain)
- Coordinates: 37°29′11″N 3°50′14″W
- Country: Spain
- Autonomous community: Andalusia
- Province: Jaén
- Comarca: Sierra Sur
- Founded: Pre-Roman

Government
  - Alcalde: Encarnación Bienvenida Castro Cano (PP)

Area
  - Total: 41.37 km^{2} (15.97 sq mi)
- Elevation: 980 m (3,220 ft)

Population (2025-01-01)
  - Total: 1,565
  - Density: 40.63/km^{2} (105.2/sq mi)
- Demonym: Frailero
- Time zone: UTC+1 (CET)
  - Summer (DST): UTC+2 (CEST)
- Postal code: 23690
- Dialing code: (+34) 953 59 3x xx

Frailes is a municipality in the Spanish province of Jaén, autonomous community of Andalucia, with a total area of 41.37 km2, a population of 1551 inhabitants in 2024 (INE figures) and a population density of 43.41 inhab/ km2. It was immortalised by the British writer, Michael Jacobs, in his 2003 book, The Factory of Light.

== Geography ==
Frailes is located 89 km south of the capital city, Jaén. The village is 55k north of Granada, which tends to make the community look toward Granada for key services. At a height of 974 metres above sea level, Frailes municipal district includes the territories of los Bailadores, Los Baños, Los Barrancos, Cañada de Alcalá, Cañada de Nogueras, Cerrillo el Ciego, Majada Abrigada, El Nogueral, Las Parras, Puerto Blanco, Los Rosales y La Solana de la Parra. Frailes is located at the Sierra Sur de Jaén and its territory comprises primarily mountain ranges.

== History ==
The origins of this municipality date back to pre-history, when the conquerors from Rome were present. The remains of Terra Sigillata attest to this. During the Spanish Muslim era, there are few records of the existence of the Islamic presence in Frailes. Nevertheless, emanating from the 16th century we have evidence of the Siege of Frailes: on 15 August 1341, Alfonso XI conquered Alcalá la Real, of which alfoz (a group of villages) belonged to Alfraylas, so from then on was incorporated to Castille. During the middle of the 16th century, the hermitage (small chapel) of Santa Lucia was built next to the first Christian settlements in Frailes, partly, with the help of the contribution of Pedro de Valencia.

In 1621, the surroundings of the hermitage of Santa Lucia was named Huerta de Santa Lucía, where the ongoing expansion of settlements took place. At the end of the 18th century, the hermitage became a parish church. Hence it also became the centre of the village. In the 19th century Frailes developed as fashionable destination due to the establishment of a spa resort at Ardales at the gateway of the village. During the early part of the 20th century, the village enjoyed times of splendour, yet after the Spanish Civil War and the exodus of a great part of the rural population to the cities, Frailes' population halved to 2,000 inhabitants.

== Gastronomy ==
Frailes' gastronomy is marked by the rural character it possesses. There's a remarkable presence of pork dishes and the traditional blood sausage, chorizo, salchichón and derivatives. There are other dishes and stews such as the beans stew, ropavieja, migas, encebollado, and also collejas omelette or the remojón (salad with orange base).

Traditional local desserts include mantas, borrachuelos, polvorones, and cherries preserved in aguardiente. Meals are often accompanied by local wine, celebrated annually each May during the town's Jornada Vinícola y Gastronómica.

== Fiestas ==
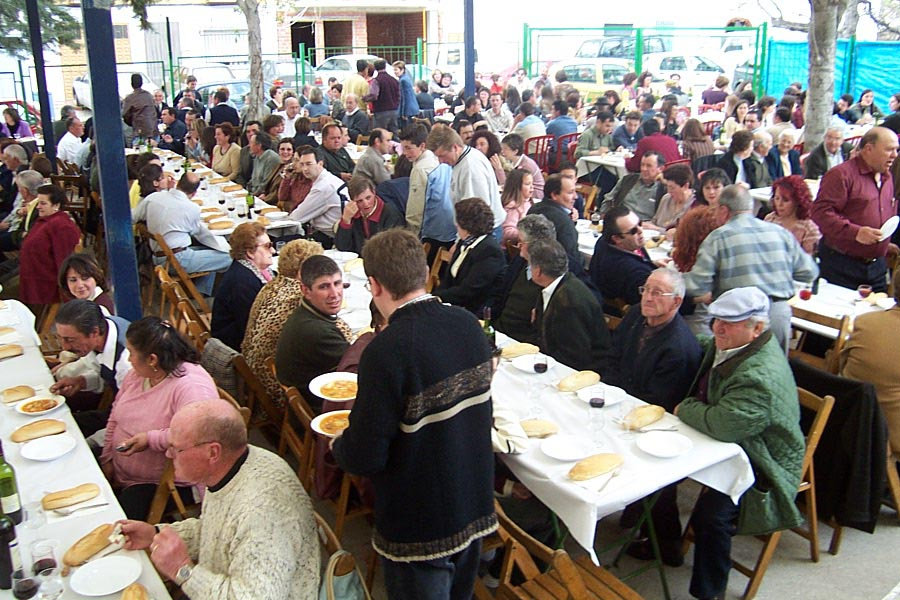
Fiesta del Vino in Frailes, Jaén.

- Fiesta del Vino.- During the first half of March, Frailes with this wine festival brings together culture and gastronomy, past and present. This tradition dates back to the 18th century, but it faces with modernity the 21st century.
- Romería to the Virgen de la Cabeza hermitage.- on the last Sunday of April, this Romeria to Hoya del Salobral is held to celebrate the day of Jaen's patron saint.
- August festival.- A fair and much loved 'verbena' is held in Mecedero to reinvigorate the population from the ardours of the Andalucian summer.
- Festival in honour of San Pedro.- 29 June, held in Spring, to celebrate the day of Frailes' patron saint.
- Festival in honour of Santa Lucía.- 13 December, this is the other patron saint of the municipality, she is the sight protector and to exalt her, a mass and a procession are held.

== See also ==
- List of municipalities in Jaén
