= Sierra Sur de Jaén (disambiguation) =

Sierra Sur de Jaén may refer to various places in Spain:

- Sierra Sur de Jaén, a mountain range of the Subbaetic system
- Sierra Sur de Jaén (DO), a Spanish geographical indication for Vino de la Tierra wines
- Sierra Sur de Jaén (comarca), a comarca in Jaén Province, see Córdoba, Spain
