= Callosa =

Callosa may stand for:

- Callosa d'En Sarrià, a town in the comarca of La Marina Baixa, in the province of Alicante, Spain
- Callosa de Segura, a town in the comarca of El Baix Segura, in the province of Alicante, Spain
- Callosa, a genus of dwarf spiders
- Callosa, a species name

== See also ==
- Including use as a species name
