= Joaquín José de Melgarejo, 1st Duke of San Fernando de Quiroga =

Spanish noble and politician

The Most Excellent Joaquín José de Melgarejo 1st Duke of San Fernando de Quiroga GE
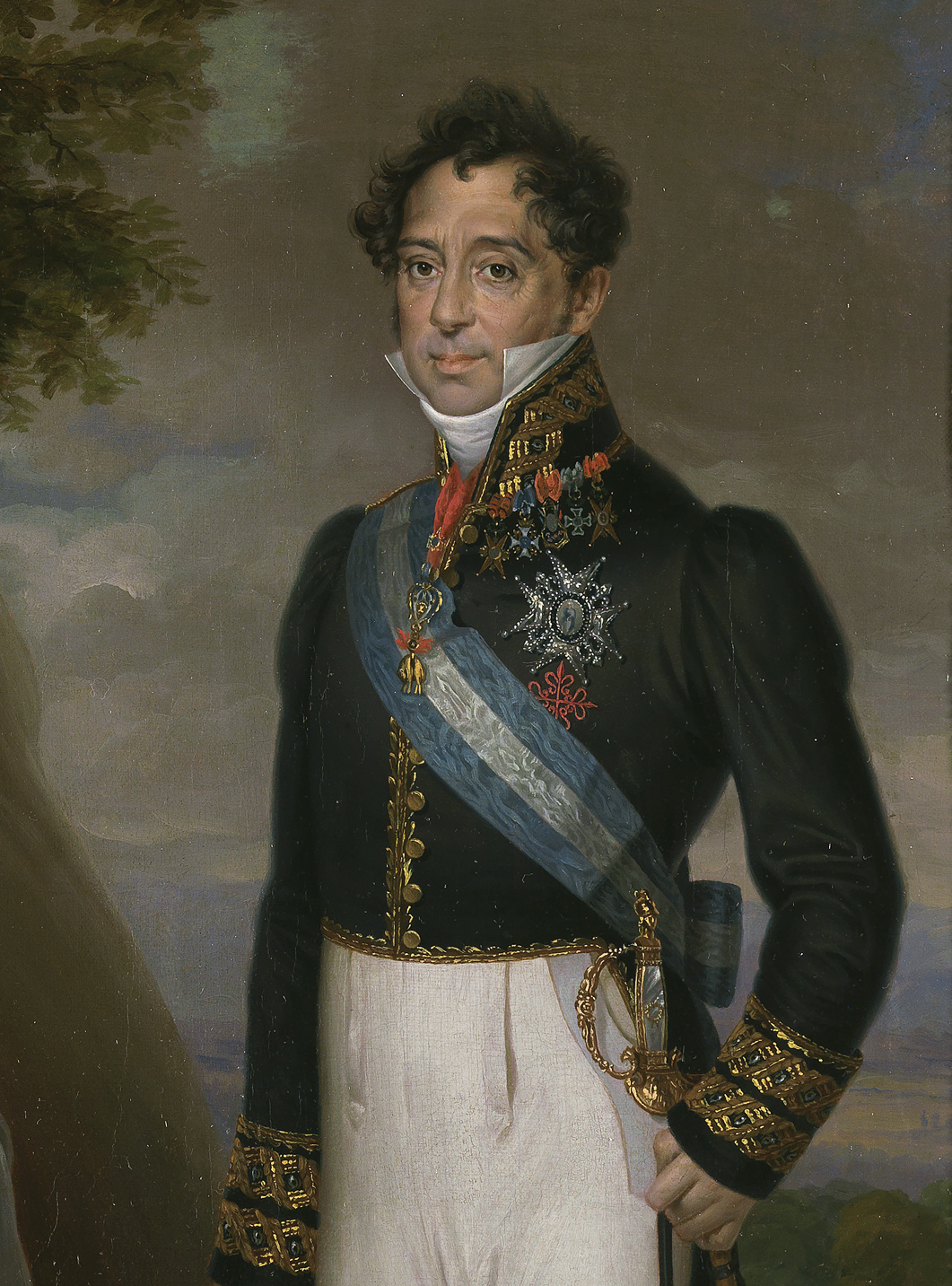
- Portrait by Rafael Tegeo

Prime Minister of Spain
- In office 12 September 1819 – 18 March 1820
- Monarch: Ferdinand VI
- Preceded by: Manuel González Salmón
- Succeeded by: Juan Zabat

Personal details
- Born: Joaquín José de Melgarejo y Saurín; 23 January 1780 Cox, Alicante, Spain
- Died: 9 April 1835 (aged 55) Madrid, Spain
- Spouse: Maria Luisa de Borbón y Vallabriga (m. 1817)

Joaquín José de Melgarejo y Saurín, 1st Duke of San Fernando de Quiroga (23 January 1780, in Cox, Alicante – 9 April 1835, in Madrid), was a Spanish noble and politician.

== Biography ==
He was the son of Joaquin de Quiroga Melgarejo y Rojas, 1st Marquis de Melgarejo; and of Joaquina Saurín y Ruiz-Dávalos. In 1817 he married María Luisa de Borbón y Vallabriga, daughter of Luis of Spain, Count of Chinchón and his wife María Teresa de Vallabriga.

His wife, María Luisa de Borbón y Vallabriga, was a granddaughter of King Philip V as a daughter of Infante Luis, but not an Infanta because her mother, María Teresa de Vallabriga, was not of royal blood. Her sister María Teresa de Borbón, 15th Countess of Chinchón had married and divorced Manuel Godoy, the de facto ruler of Spain between 1792 and 1808.

Joaquín José de Melgarejo fought against the French during the Peninsular War and reached the rank of Brigadier general. In 1815, King Ferdinand VII made him Duke of San Fernando de Quiroga. He was also a senator as well as a knight of the Order of the Golden Fleece (1823) and the Order of Calatrava.
In September 1819 he became Prime Minister of Spain until March 1820.

Between 1828 and 1829, he was the owner of the Christ Crucified by Velázquez, before he gave it to the King, who gave the painting to the Prado Museum.

De Melgarejo was going to be named Prócer del Reino in 1835, but died before he could take up the post.
Having no children, he was succeeded as Duke of San Fernando de Quiroga by the son of his cousin Isabel Melgarejo, Francisco Javier de Losada y Melgarejo.
