= Duke of San Fernando de Quiroga =

Dukedom of Spain

Dukedom of San Fernando de Quiroga
- Creation date: 13 November 1815
- Created by: Ferdinand VII
- Peerage: Peerage of Spain
- First holder: Joaquín José Melgarejo y Saurín, 1st Duke of San Fernando de Quiroga
- Present holder: Rafael Ignacio Melgarejo y de la Peña, 9th Duke of San Fernando de Quiroga

Duke of San Fernando de Quiroga (Spanish: Duque de San Fernando de Quiroga) is a hereditary title in the Peerage of Spain, accompanied by the dignity of Grandee and granted in 1815 by Ferdinand VII to Joaquín José Melgarejo, 3rd Marquess of Melgarejo in the Kingdom of Naples and Mayordomo de semana of the king during his time as Prince of Asturias.

Such was the affection of king Ferdinand VII for the 1st Duke that he approved of his marriage with his cousin María Luisa de Borbón y Vallabriga, a daughter of the king's uncle, Infante Luis of Spain.

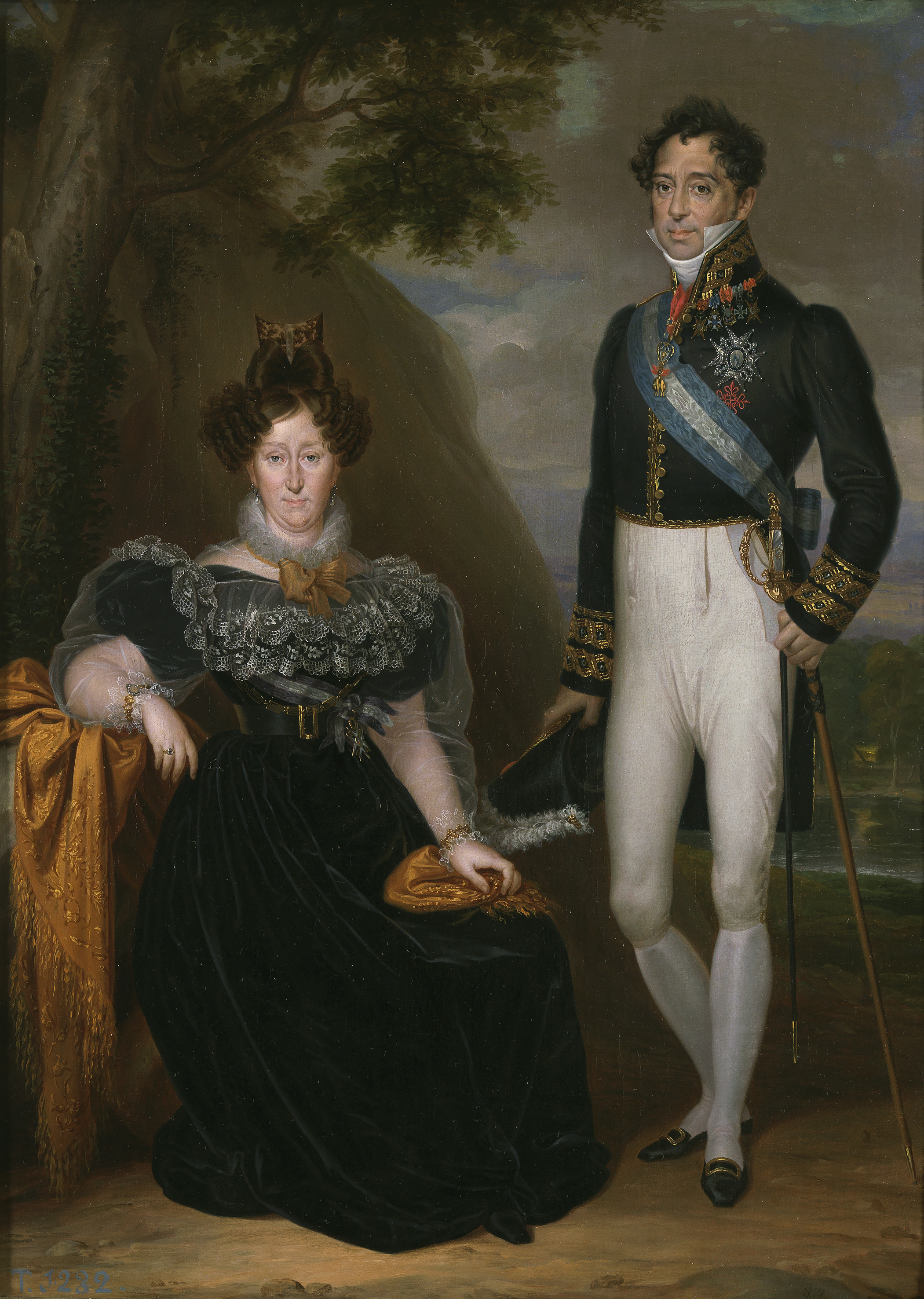
"The Dukes of San Fernando de Quiroga" by Rafael Tegeo, c. 1830

== Dukes of San Fernando de Quiroga (1815) ==
- Joaquín José Melgarejo y Saurín, 1st Duke of San Fernando de Quiroga
- María Virtudes de Melgarejo y Saurín, 2nd Duchess of San Fernando de Quiroga
- Francisco Javier de Losada y Melgarejo, 3rd Duke of San Fernando de Quiroga
- José María Melgarejo y Enseña, 4th Duke of San Fernando de Quiroga
- Nicolás Melgarejo y Melgarejo, 5th Duke of San Fernando de Quiroga
- Rafael Melgarejo y Tordesillas, 6th Duke of San Fernando de Quiroga
- Jaime Melgarejo y Osborne, 7th Duke of San Fernando de Quiroga
- Rafael Melgarejo y Piñar, 8th Duke of San Fernando de Quiroga
- Rafael Ignacio Melgarejo y de la Peña, 9th Duke of San Fernando de Quiroga

== See also ==
- List of dukes in the peerage of Spain
- List of current grandees of Spain
