= María Teresa de Vallabriga =

Aragonese aristocrat

Maria Teresa de Vallabriga
- Countess of Chinchón
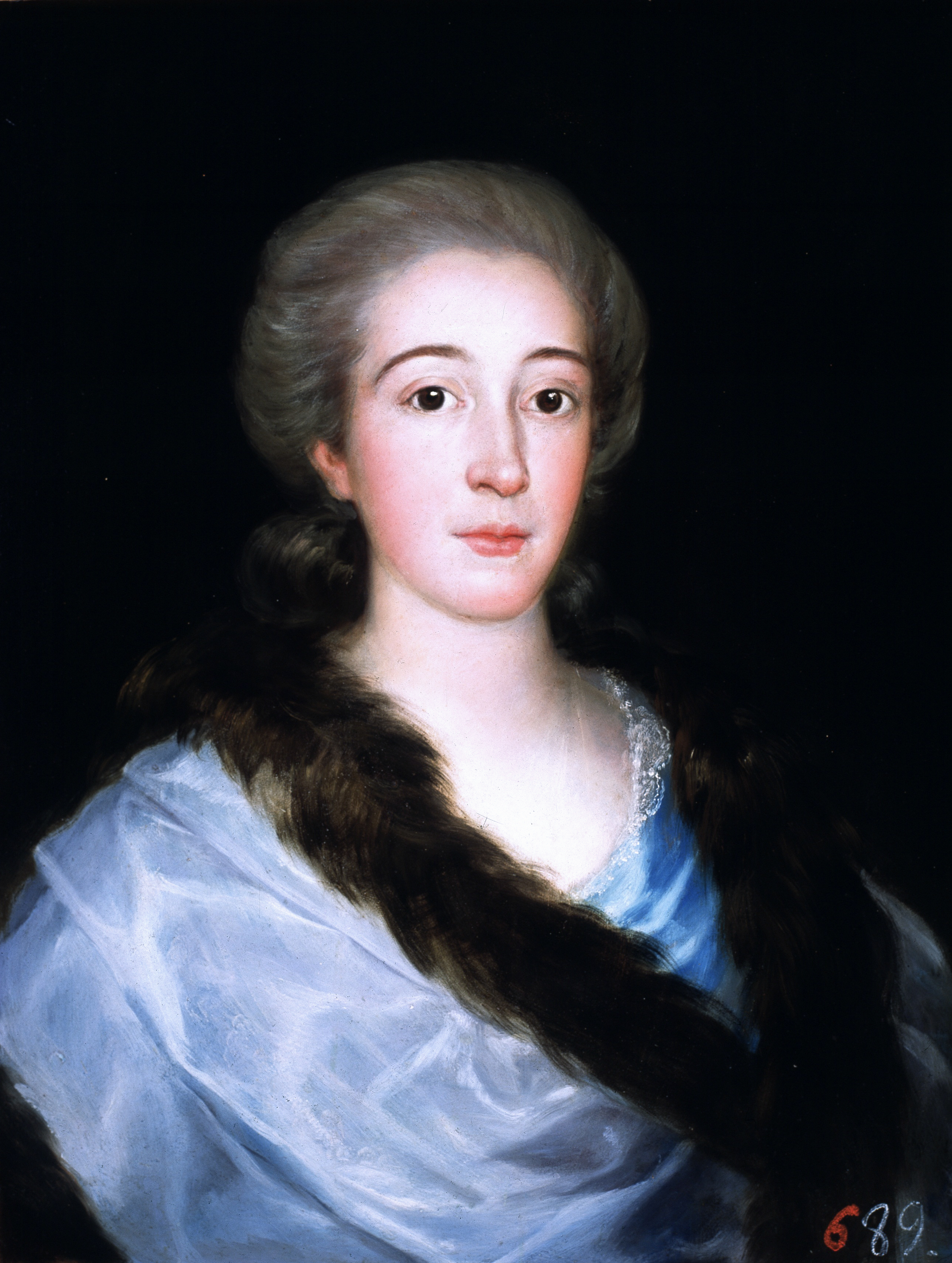
- Portrait by Goya
- Born: 5 September 1758; Zaragoza, Spain
- Died: 16 February 1820 (aged 61); Zaragoza
- Spouse: Infante Luis of Spain (m. 1776)
- Issue: Luis María de Borbón, 14th Count of Chinchón; María Teresa de Borbón, 15th Countess of Chinchón; María Luisa de Borbón, Duchess of San Fernando
Names
- María Teresa de Vallabriga y Rozas Español y Drummond
- House: Bourbon
- Father: José Ignacio de Vallabriga y Español
- Mother: Josefa de Rozas y Drummond de Melfort

María Teresa de Vallabriga y Rozas Español y Drummond (5 September 1758 – 16 February 1820 in Zaragoza), was an Aragonese aristocrat. She was the morganatic spouse of the Spanish prince Infante Luis, Count of Chinchón.

== Life ==
She was 99th Noble Dame of the Royal Order of Queen María Luisa on 7 December 1800, 13th Condesa de Chinchón Grandee of Spain 1st Class, daughter of José Ignacio de Vallabriga y Español, Count of Torrescasas and Josefa de Rozas y Drummond de Melfort, 4th Countess of Castelblanco, and granddaughter of the Spanish Jacobite José de Rozas.

=== Marriage ===
On 27 June (some say 28 January), 1776 at Olias del Rey, she married Luis of Spain, Count of Chinchón. The marriage was much to the liking of Luis' brother king Charles III: the king had not allowed his brother to enter a dynastic marriage with a royal person because he wanted to ensure that Luis could not have children with a claim to the throne, and he made certain that the children of Luis and María Teresa were not to be able to inherit the throne, nor even their father's name Bourbon.

As the spouse of Luis, María Teresa was obliged to accompany him in his exile from court at his estates in Velada and Arenas de San Pedro. Charles III allowed Luis to attend the royal court, but he did not give Maria Teresa the permission to do so.

=== Later life ===
In 1785, she became a widow. Eight days after the death of her spouse, the king deprived Maria Teresa the custody of her children and entrusted them to Francisco Lorenzana in Toledo. Between 1785 and 1792, María Teresa lived at the Arenas de San Pedro estate. During this period, she was described as mentally weak, which was probably a reference to a depression.

In 1792, María Teresa was given permission to live where she liked. She visited her children in Toledo, and then left for her home city of Zaragoza. When her daughter married Manuel Godoy in 1797, her children were granted the right to their father's name Bourbon and several privileges, and in 1802, María Teresa was granted the privilege to use the royal crest on her carriage.

When the French invaded Spain in 1808 María Teresa de Vallabriga fled to Mallorca where she lived until 1814. She lived her last years in Zaragoza.

Goya made several notable paintings of María Teresa de Vallabriga.

== Children ==
The couple had four children:

- Luis María Cardinal de Borbón y Vallabriga, Farnesio y Rozas (Cadalso de los Vidrios, 1777 – Madrid, 1823);
- a stillborn;
- María Teresa Carolina; married in the Escorial, Madrid, 2 October 1797 Manuel de Godoy y Álvarez de Faria, 1st Principe de la Paz, 1st Duque de Alcúdia and 1st Duque de Sueca (Badajoz, 12 May 1767 – Paris, 4 October 1851), and had issue, an only daughter Carlota Luisa Manuela.
- María Luisa de Borbón y Vallabriga, Farnesio y Rozas (Toledo, 21 March 1780 – Paris, 1 December 1846), 98th Noble Dame of the Royal Order of Queen María Luisa on 10 October 1800, married in 1817 Joaquín José de Melgarejo y Saurín, de Rojas y Ruíz-Dávalos (Cox, Alicante, 23 January 1780 – Madrid, 9 April 1835), 3rd Marqués de Melgarejo and 1st Duque de San Fernando de Quiroga Grandee of Spain First Class with a Coat of Arms of de Melgarejo, 39th Minister of External Affairs of Spain (12 September 1819 – 18 March 1820), without issue.
