= La Pandera =

Mountain in Spain

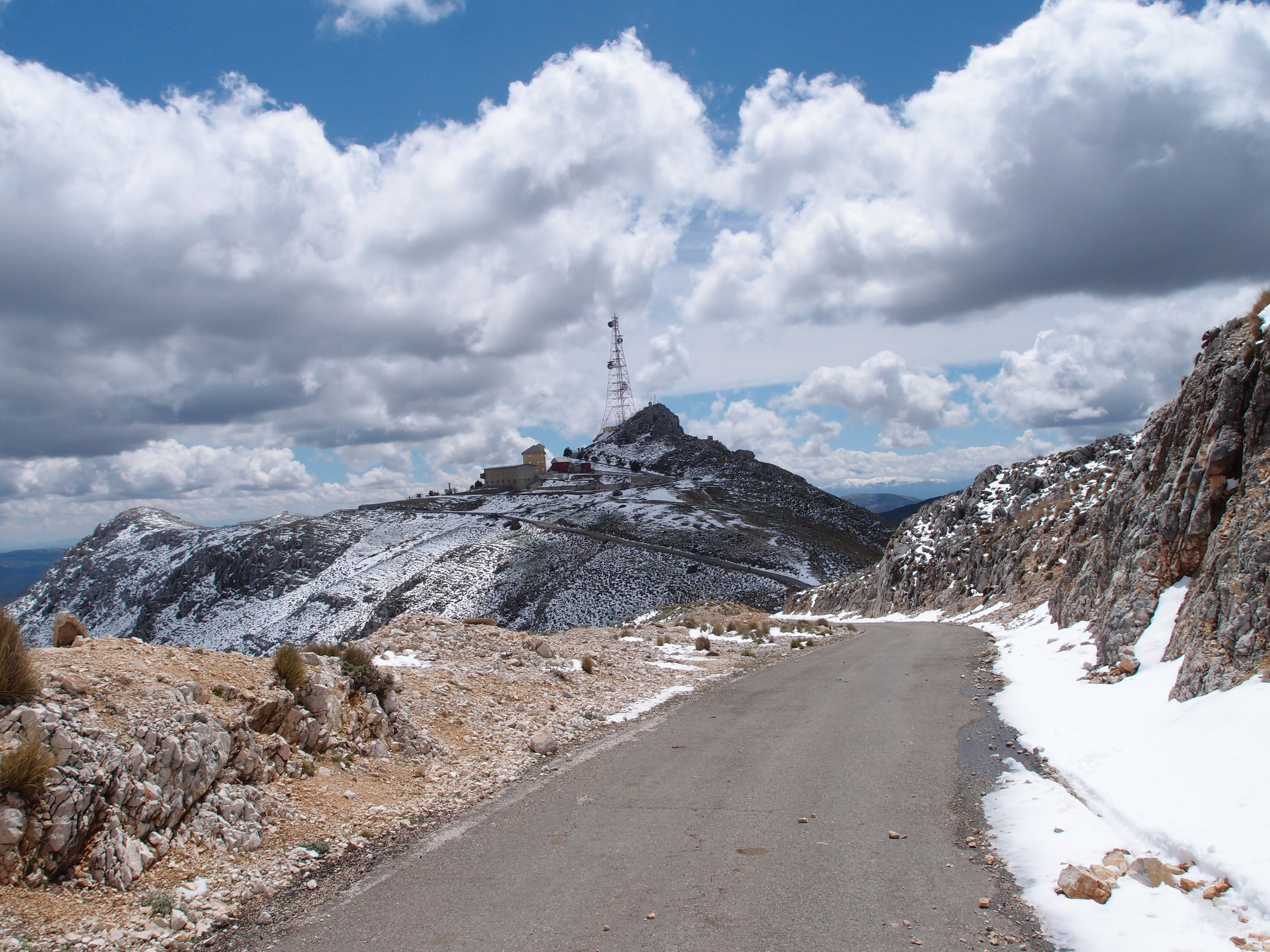
- The summit of La Pandera

Highest point
- Elevation: 1,872 m (6,142 ft)
- Prominence: 818 m (2,684 ft)
- Coordinates: 37°38′00″N 3°46′00″W

Geography
- Location within Spain
- Location: Sierra Sur, Jaén, Spain
- Parent range: Subbaetic System

La Pandera (altitude 1,872 m (6,142 ft)) is a mountain and the highest point of the Sierra Sur de Jaén mountain range in the Province of Jaén, Spain. There is a military station at the summit.

== Sport ==
=== Cycling ===
The Vuelta a España has had a stage finish, at the summit of La Pandera, on several occasions.

Edition	Winner
2002	Roberto Heras (ESP)
2003	Alejandro Valverde (ESP)
2006	Andrey Kashechkin (KAZ)
2009	Damiano Cunego (ITA)
2017	Rafał Majka (POL)
2022	Richard Carapaz (ECU)
2026	TBD
