= Castillo de Alcalá la Real =

Coordinates: 37.459722°N 3.929167°W

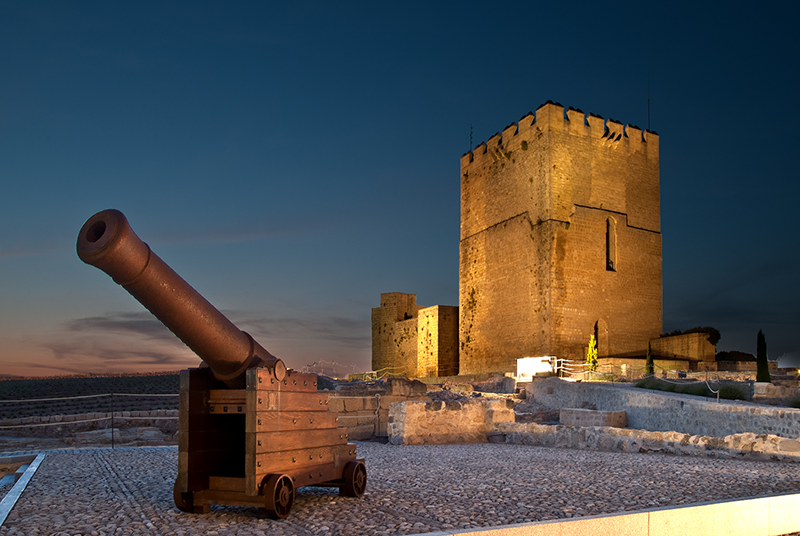
Castillo de Alcalá la Real

Castillo de Alcalá la Real (or Fortaleza de La Mota) is a castle in Alcala la Real, in the province of Jaén, Spain. It is a defensive enclosure, located at an elevation of 1,029 metres (3,376 ft). It dates to the 13th-14th century, although some elements of the structure are older. The castle was declared a Bien de Interés Cultural monument in 1993.

== See also ==
- High medieval domes
