= San Martin, Callosa de Segura =

Church in Callosa de Segura, Spain

Coordinates: 38°07′22″N 0°52′45″W

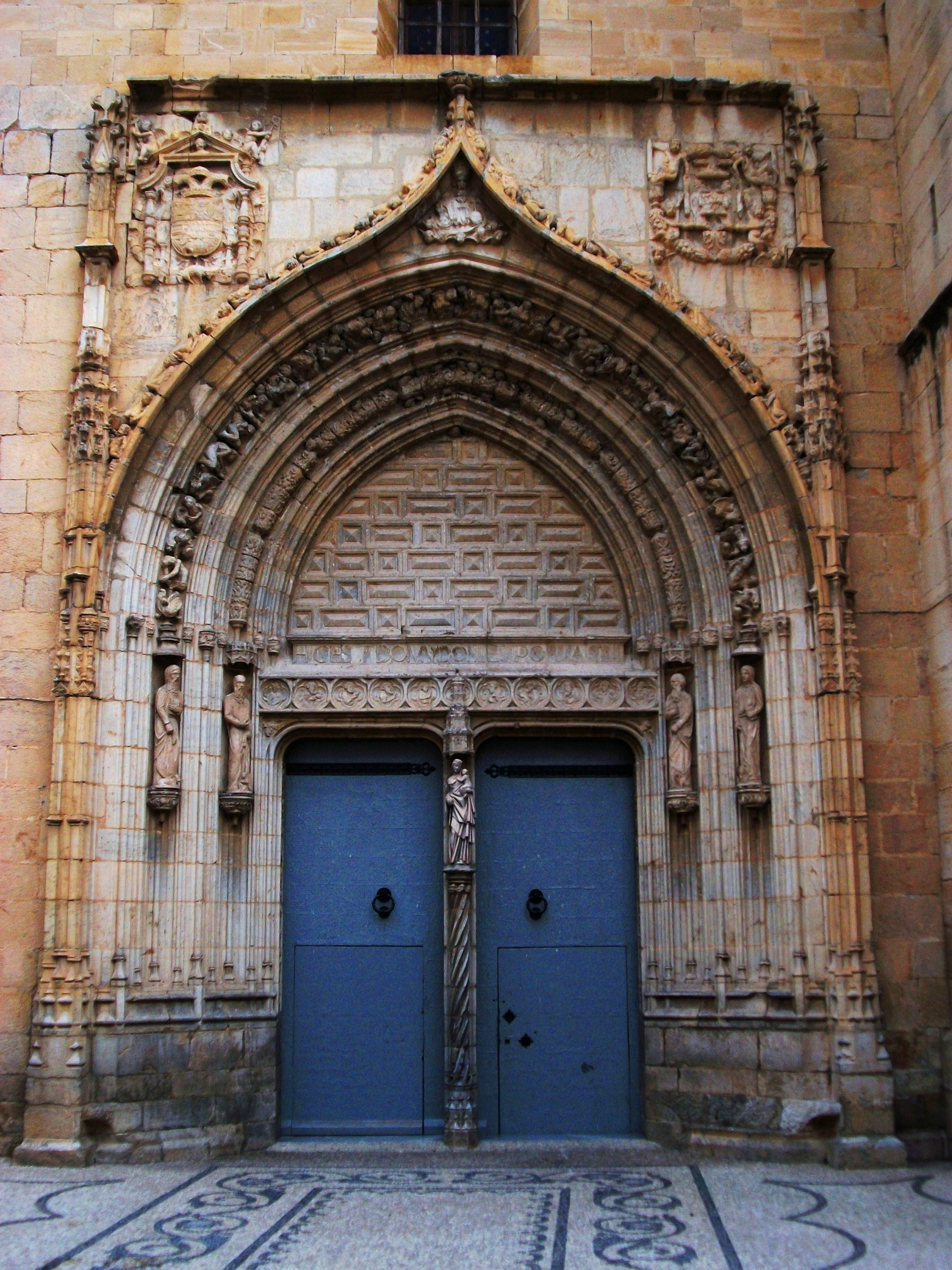
Portada de l'església de Sant Martí, Callosa de Segura

San Martín, Obispo de Tours is a Renaissance-style, Roman Catholic archpresbyteral church (iglesia arciprestal) located in the town of in Callosa de Segura, Alicante, Spain. It has been declared a historic monument.

== History ==
It was built in the 16th century and is an example of a Renaissance hall-church, with a nave and two aisles of equal height with vaults resting on tall classical columns, responding to a model not found elsewhere in province of Valencia. The main facade belongs to the late Gothic style, adorned with archivolts, on which is inscribed (in Latin) "This is the House of God, this is the Gate of Heaven".

In the 17th century a belfry was built (with five bells, named - from the highest to lowest - la Martina, la Purísima, San José, Sagrado Corazón and Santísimo Sacramento) was added. In the 18th century Rococo interior decoration and an enormous internal central cupola were added, and the Sacristy and Chapel of the Communion were added in that century in the Neoclassical style.

Inside the church are important jewelled works by Miguel de Vera (16th century), such as an image-reliquary of Saint Martin, the Archiprestal cross and the Processional Crook, as well as passiflora sculptures and contemporary altarpieces by Rabasa, Noguera, and others.
