= Sierra de Orihuela =

Mountain range in Valencia, Spain

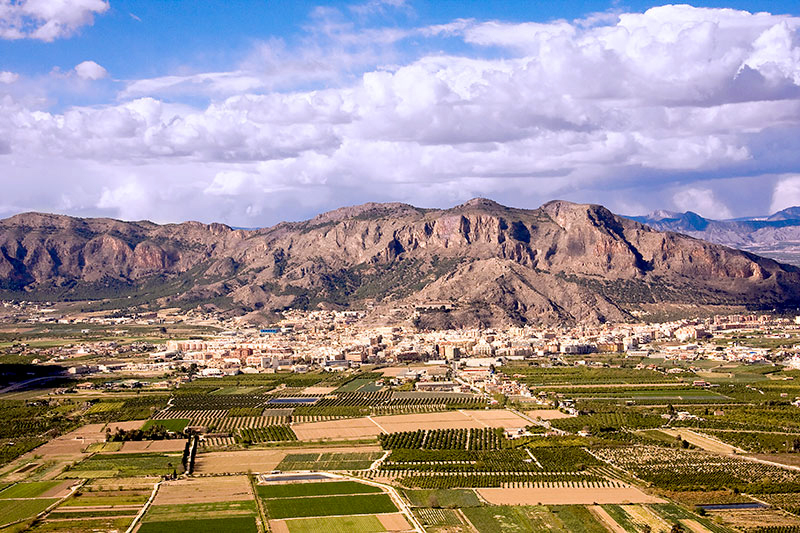

Highest point
- Elevation: 634 m (2,080 ft)
- Listing: List of mountains in the Valencian Community
- Coordinates: 38°06′28″N 0°58′08″W

Geography
- Location within Spain
- Location: Vega Baja del Segura, Valencian Community; Region of Murcia
- Parent range: Cordillera Prebética, Eastern zone

Geology
- Mountain type: karstic

Climbing
- Easiest route: From Orihuela

Sierra de Orihuela (Valencian: Serra d'Oriola) is a 9.4 km (6 mi) long mountain range in the Vega Baja del Segura (Valencian: Baix Segura) comarca, Valencian Community, Spain. Its highest point is Peña de Orihuela (634 m). This range is named after the town of Orihuela (Valencian: Oriola), located at the feet of the mountains. The western end of the range is within the limits of the Santomera municipal term, in the Region of Murcia.

These conspicuous limestone mountains rise abruptly from the low Segura River Valley floor and have some very steep cliffs popular with rock climbers, like "La Pared Negra". There is very little vegetation on the arid mountain slopes and both physically and geologically the Sierra de Orihuela is similar to the Sierra de Callosa range located only 2.6 km to the east. Smoother Sierra de Hurchillo is located 4.8 km to the south

== See also ==
- Mountains of the Valencian Community
- Sierra de Callosa
