= Prebaetic System =

System of mountain ranges in the southern Iberian Peninsula

- Sistema Prebético
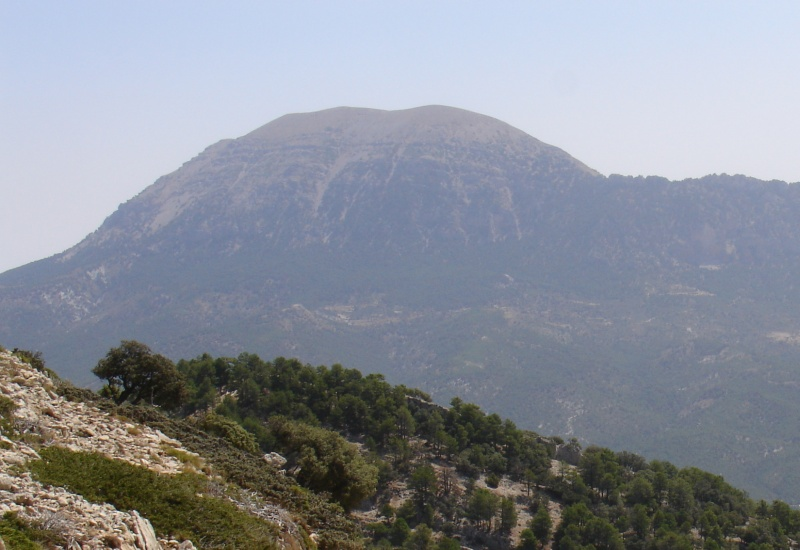
- La Sagra seen from Sierra Seca

Highest point
- Peak: La Sagra
- Elevation: 2,382 m (7,815 ft)

Dimensions
- Length: 360 km (220 mi) ENE/WSW
- Width: 100 km (62 mi) NNW/SSE

Geography
- Location within Spain
- Country: Spain
- Regions: Andalusia, Region of Murcia, Castile-La Mancha, Valencian Community
- Range coordinates: 37°57′N 2°34′W
- Parent range: Baetic System

Geology
- Orogeny: Alpine orogeny
- Rock age: Cenozoic
- Rock types: Schist, granite and slate

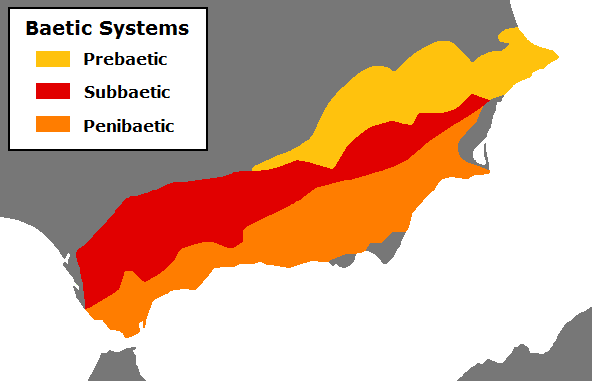
Schematic representation of the Baetic System of mountain ranges

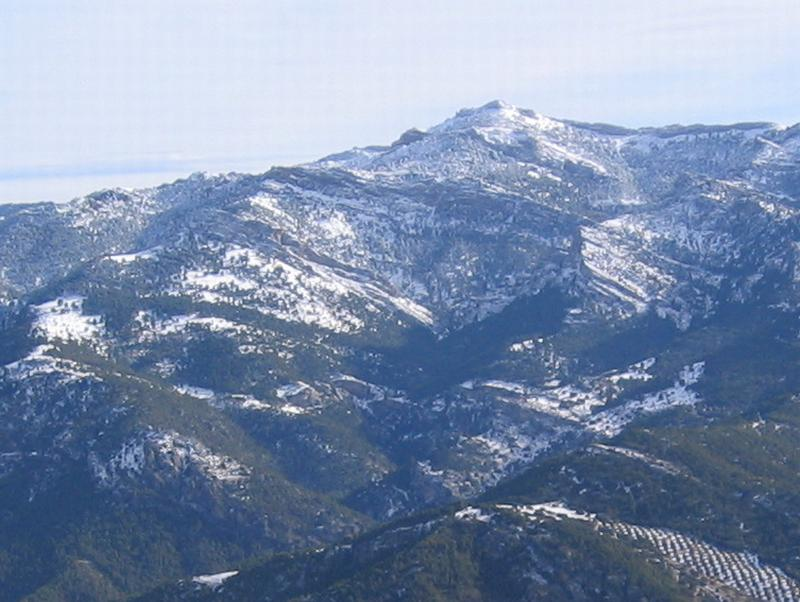
1,956 m high Aguilón del Loco, one of the highest peaks in Sierra de Cazorla

The Prebaetic System (Spanish: Sistemas Prebéticos or Sistema Prebético, also often referred to simply as Prebético) is a system of mountain ranges that forms the northeasternmost prolongation of the Baetic System in the southern Iberian Peninsula.

== Geography ==
Although it is sometimes referred to as Cordillera Prebética, it is not a proper cordillera, or continuous alignment of ranges, but a broken system of mountain ranges. Unlike the other two subsystems of the Baetic System, it is not present in the western area, but begins west of the eastern edge of the Sierra Sur de Jaén near Martos.

The Prebaetic System runs along eastern interior Andalusia, across the Region of Murcia, reaching the Mediterranean Sea shores in the southern Valencian Community.

Its highest point is La Sagra, Sierra de la Sagra; other high ranges are Sierra de Segura and Sierra de Cazorla. The Sierra de María in northern Almeria Province runs across the Prebaetic and the Penibaetic System, overlapping with both.

== Geology ==
Geologically the Prebaetic System shares similar characteristics to its parent system, the Subbaetic System and it is considered its eastern offshoot. The materials that compose it were formed in a relatively shallow sea. The Iberian System rises north of the eastern part of the Prebaetic System.

== Main mountain ranges ==
Some of the mountain ranges that make up the Prebaetic complex are, from west to east:

- Sierra Sur de Jaén, overlapping with the Sistema Subbético
- Sierra Mágina
- Sierra de la Sagra
- Sierra de Cazorla
- Sierra de Segura
- Sierra de Alcaraz
- Sierra de Castril
- Sierra de Cabrilla
- Sierra Seca
- Sierra del Taibilla
- Sierra de María, overlapping with the Sistema Penibético.
- Serra de Crevillent
- Sierra de Orihuela
- Sierra de Callosa
- Serra Mariola
- Serra del Ferrer
- La Carrasqueta
- Puig Campana
- Aitana
- Maigmó Massif
- Serrella
- Serra de la Xortà
- Serra de la Penya-roja
- Montgó Massif
- Sierra de Bernia
- Penyal d'Ifac

== See also ==
- Baetic System
- Geography of Spain
- Geology of the Iberian Peninsula
