= Castillo de Locubín =

Castillo de Locubín, Spain
- village
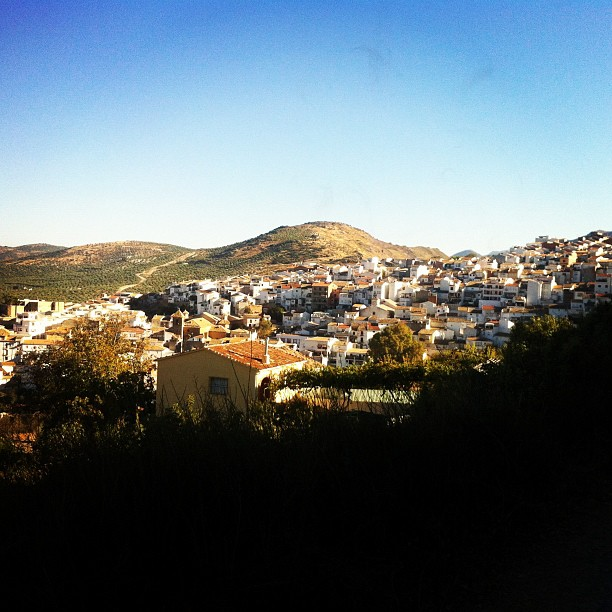
- View of Castillo de Locubín

- Coat of arms

- Location in the Province of Jaén Castillo de Locubín (Andalusia) Castillo de Locubín (Spain)
- Coordinates: 37°31′N 3°56′W
- Country: Spain
- Autonomous community: Andalusia
- Province: Jaén
- Municipality: Castillo de Locubín

Area
  - Total: 104 km^{2} (40 sq mi)
- Elevation: 706 m (2,316 ft)

Population (2025-01-01)
  - Total: 3,805
  - Density: 36.6/km^{2} (94.8/sq mi)
- Time zone: UTC+1 (CET)
  - Summer (DST): UTC+2 (CEST)

Castillo de Locubín is a village located in the south-western corner of the province of Jaén, in Andalucia, Spain. According to 2024 INE figures, the village had a population of 3840.

Castillo de Locubín is a pueblo blanco or "white village", so named for the white-washed external walls of the houses. It is located in the foothills of the Sierra Sur. The Moorish castle is in ruins. The 16th-century church is dedicated to St Peter the Apostle. Castillo's main local crafts are pottery and ceramics. During the first week in June, a cherry fair to celebrate the cherry harvest is held, with competitions for the best liqueurs, desserts and cuisine based on the cherry. Castillo is 11 kilometers north of Alcalá la Real and 2 km from the N432 main road. Monday is market day.

== See also ==
- List of municipalities in Jaén
