= Sierra Sur de Jaén (DO) =

Wine region in Spain

Sierra Sur de Jaén VdlT
- Wine region
- Sierra Sur de Jaén VdlT in the province of Jaén in the region of Andalusia
- Type: Vino de la Tierra
- Country: Spain

Sierra Sur de Jaén is a Spanish geographical indication for Vino de la Tierra wines in the Sierra Sur de Jaén area, Andalusia, Spain. Vino de la Tierra is one step below the mainstream Denominación de Origen indication on the Spanish wine quality ladder.

The area covered by this geographical indication comprises the municipalities of Alcalá la Real, Castillo de Locubín, Frailes, Fuensanta de Martos, Valdepeñas De Jaén Los Villares, Alcaudete and Martos, in the southwestern part of the province of Jaén.

This geographic location acquired its Vino de la Tierra status in 2003.

== Grape varieties ==
- Red: tintas: Garnacha tinta, Pinot noir, Syrah, Cabernet Sauvignon, Tempranillo and Merlot
- White: Jaén blanco and Chardonnay
