= Cazorla, Andalusia =

Cazorla
- Municipality
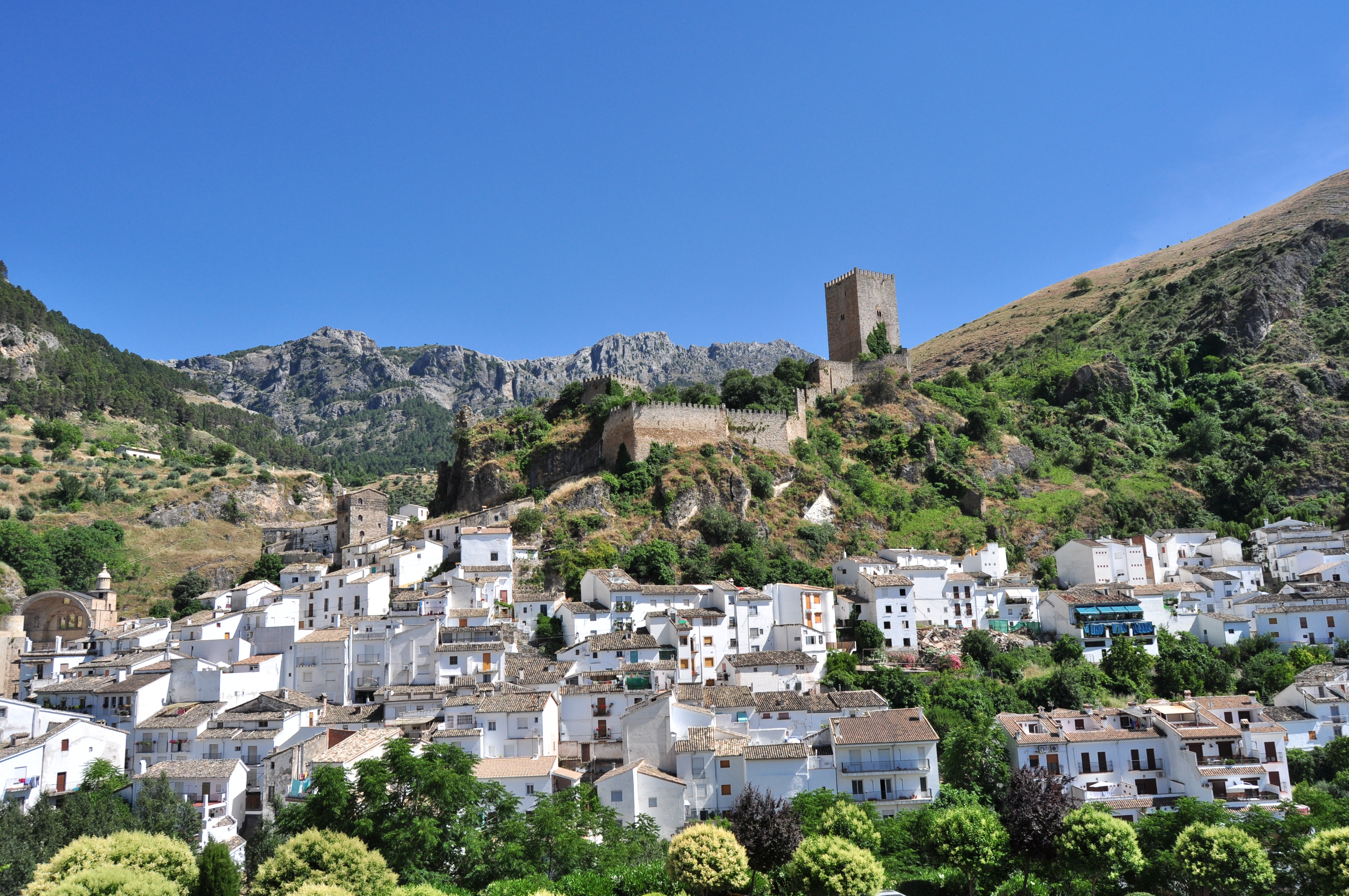
- Cazorla with the Yedra Castle at background.

- Flag Coat of arms

- Location in Spain
- Coordinates: 37°54′N 3°0′W
- Country: Spain
- Region: Andalusia
- Province: Jaén

Area
  - Total: 303 km^{2} (117 sq mi)
- Elevation: 826 m (2,710 ft)

Population (2025-01-01)
  - Total: 6,930
  - Density: 22.9/km^{2} (59.2/sq mi)
- Time zone: UTC+1 (CET)
  - Summer (DST): UTC+2 (CEST)

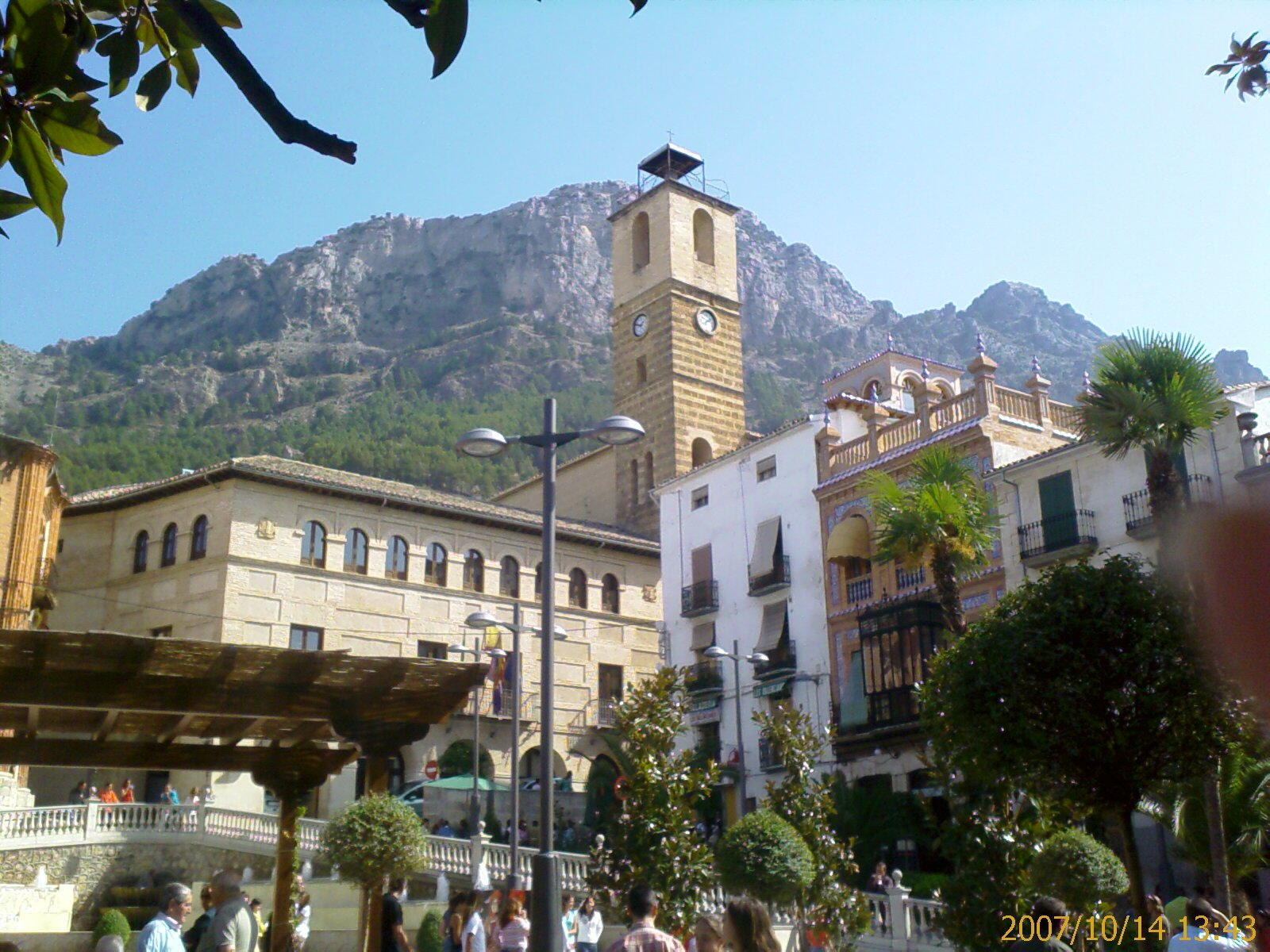
Central place of cazorla, called "The Egg" (El Huevo).

Cazorla is a municipality of Spain located in the province of Jaén, Andalusia. According to the 2024 INE figures, it had a population of 7,071 inhabitants.

== Description ==
Cazorla lies at an elevation of 836 metres on the western slope of the Sierra de Cazorla. It is the entry point and base for visits to the Natural Park of Sierras de Cazorla, Segura y Las Villas Natural Park, a vast protected area of magnificent river gorges and forests. Spain's second longest river, the Guadalquivir, has its source in the mountains to the south of the settlement.

Distances to nearby cities are: Jaén, 121 km.; Granada, 205 km.; and Linares, 71 km. See Mapa de Carreteras de Jaén

The town is constructed around three main squares, the Plaza de la Constitución (La Tejera), the Plaza de la Corredera (El Huevo, because of its egg shape), and the Plaza Santa Maria (La Plaza Vieja). The Cerezuelo River runs underneath the Plaza Santa Maria. This last square is the oldest and is connected to the other two by narrow, twisting streets. It takes its name from the old cathedral which, unfinished and damaged by floods in the seventeenth century, was later burnt by French troops. It is now in ruin, and it serves as scenic or institutional events. Above the square sits an austere, reconstructed Moorish castle tower called La Yedra. Still higher up on the rocky escarpment lies the ruins of yet another ruined fortress, the Castle of the Five Corners (Castillo de las Cinco Esquinas).

A recommended excursion is to the nearby village of La Iruela, which has a ruined Moorish fortress perched on a daunting rock peak. A number of battles were fought here during the Reconquista until Don Rodrigo Jimenez de Rada, archbishop of Toledo, reconquered it in 1231 and made it the seat of his archbishopric.

Its primitive structure is relatively intact. The principal defenses consist of a crumbling principal tower and two separate enclosures, with some of its battlements still intact, connected by a long curtain wall. These walls also protected the monastery, whose remains are still visible nearby. See Castles

The history of Cazorla goes back more than two thousand years. Under the Romans the town had the name of Carcacena. Not only were there significant Iberian and Roman settlements here, but this was also the see of one of the first bishoprics of early Christian Spain. Under the Moors it was a strategic stronghold and one of dozens of fortresses and watchtowers guarding the mountains. Taken after a bitter struggle in 1235, during the Reconquista, the town then acted as an outpost for Christian troops.

Today Cazorla is heavily dependent on rural tourism and hosts events such as the Cazorla Blues Festival each July. There is also production of high-quality olive oil from the one third of municipal land planted in olive trees. Sierra de Cazorla is the Denomination of Origen for this olive oil. See Sierra de Cazorla. The town celebrates its annual fair in mid-September.

The town there has a number of three- and four-star hotels and rural guest houses.

Winter nights can be cold and windy due to the elevation, but snow is infrequent. Summers are cooler than the low-lying plains to the west and the town fills with tourists during the summer months.

== Gallery ==
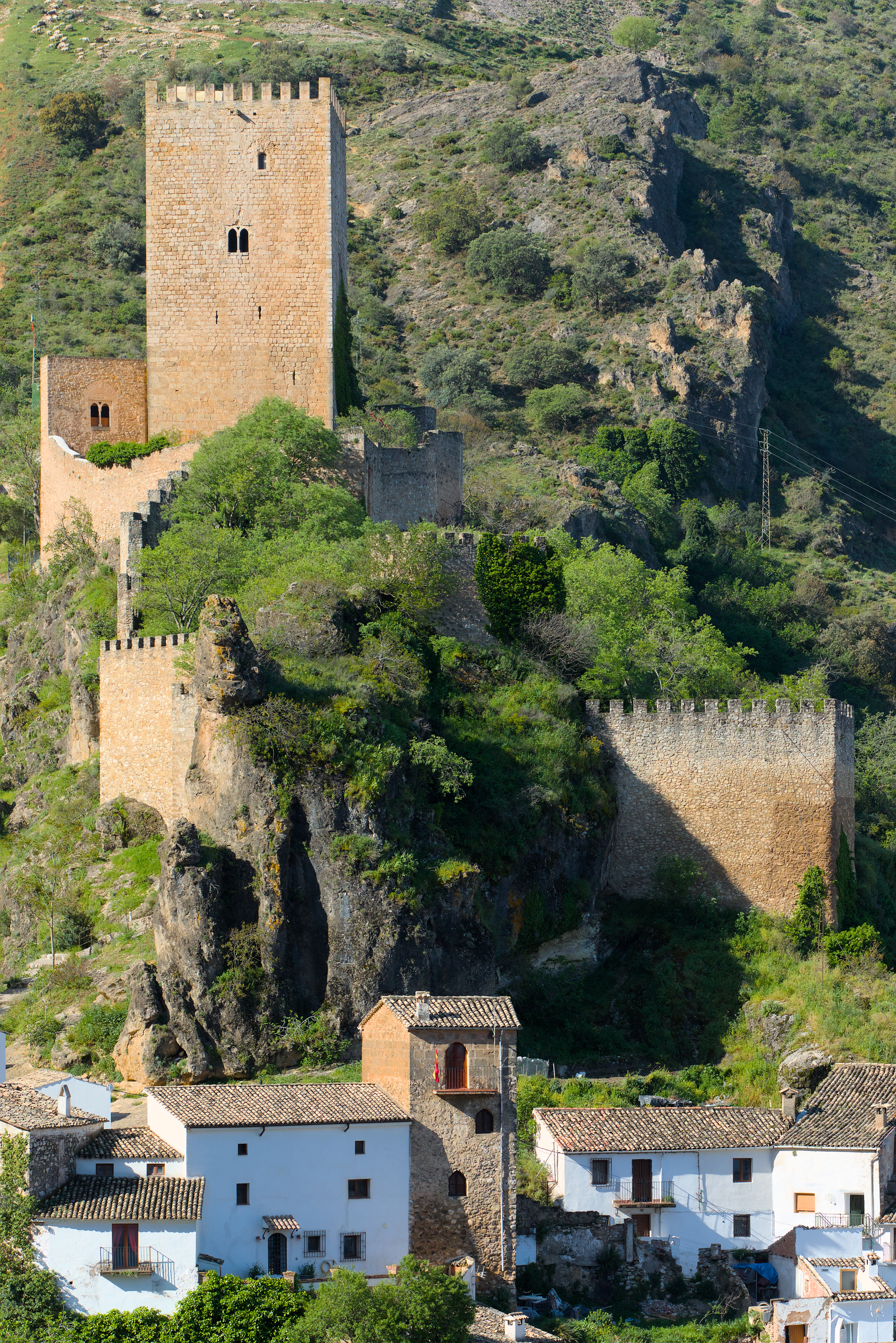
Castillo de la Yedra, viewed from town.

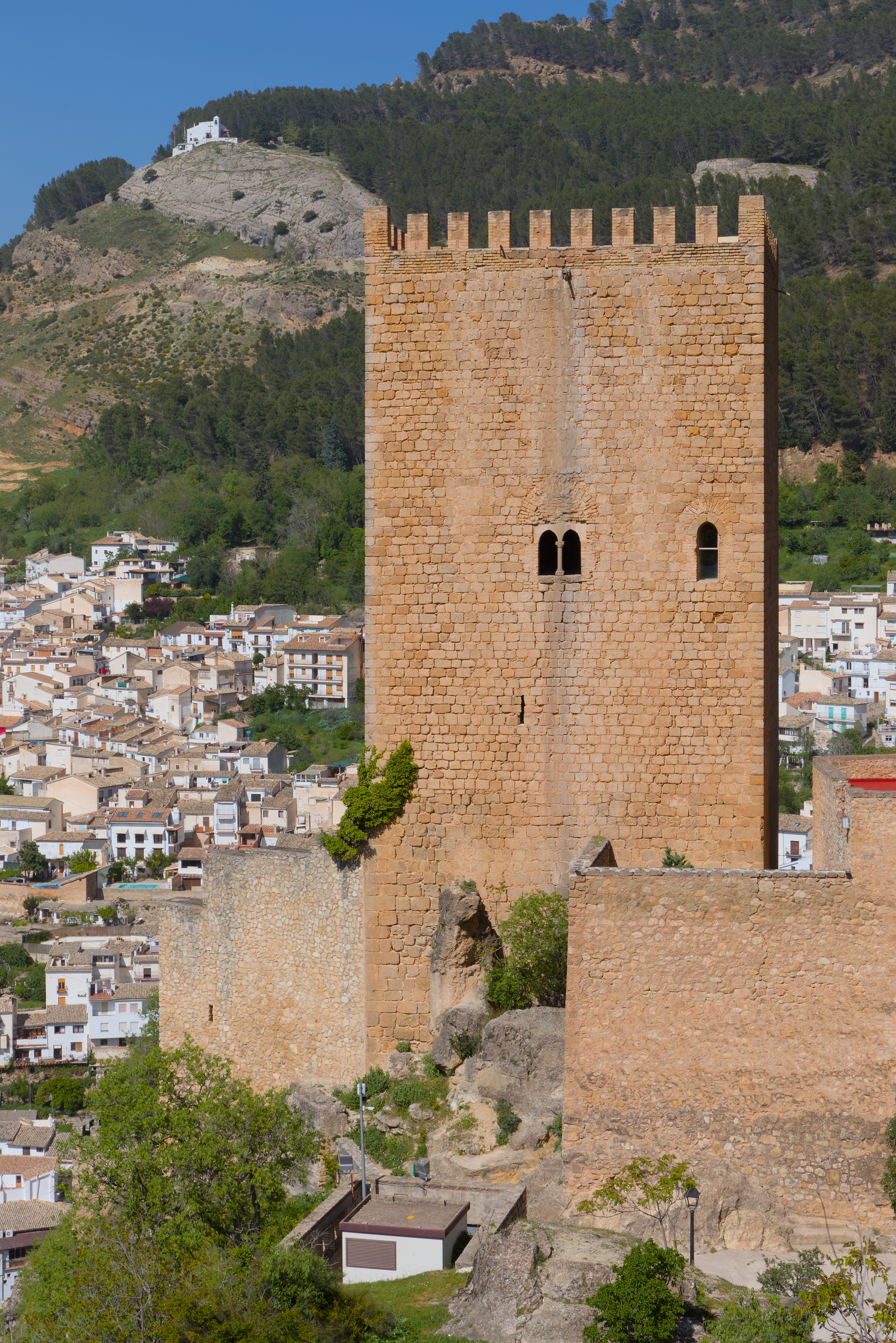
Castillo de la Yedra, the town and the hermitage of Virgen de la Cabeza.

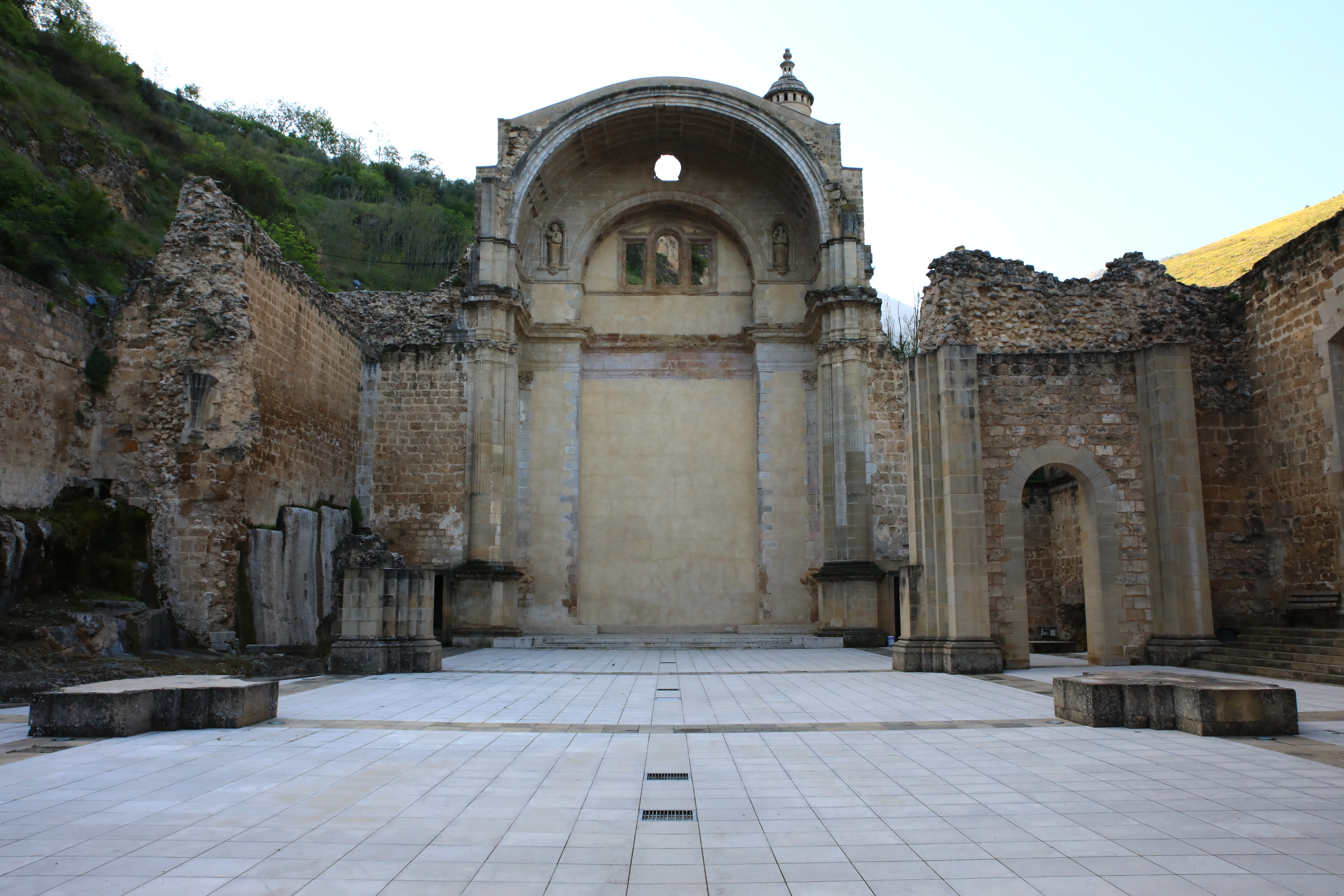
Ruins of St. Mary's church.

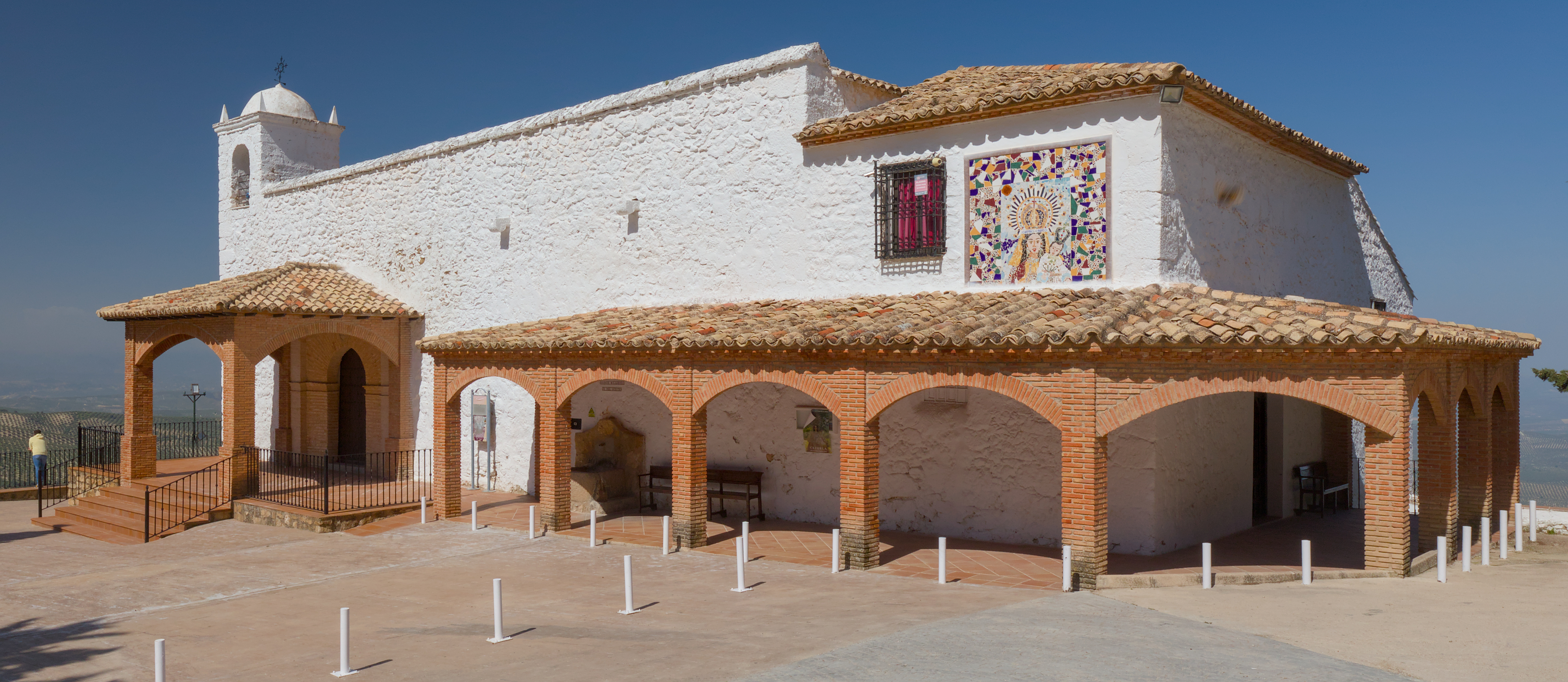
Hermitage of Virgen de la Cabeza.

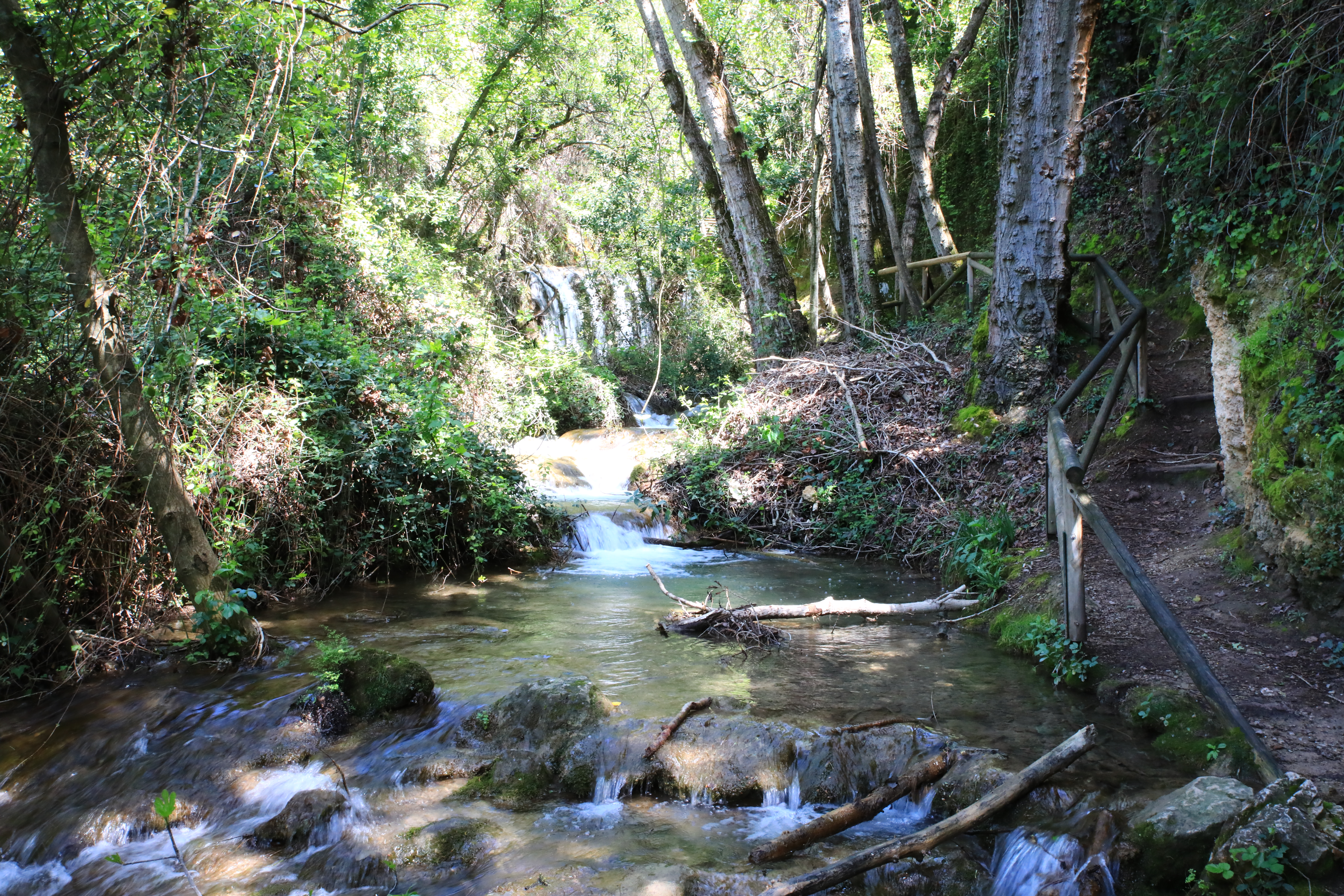
River Cerezuelo near the town's limits.

== Twin towns — Sister cities ==
- La Sénia, Catalonia, Spain

== See also ==
- List of municipalities in Jaén
