= Sierra de Cazorla =

Mountain range

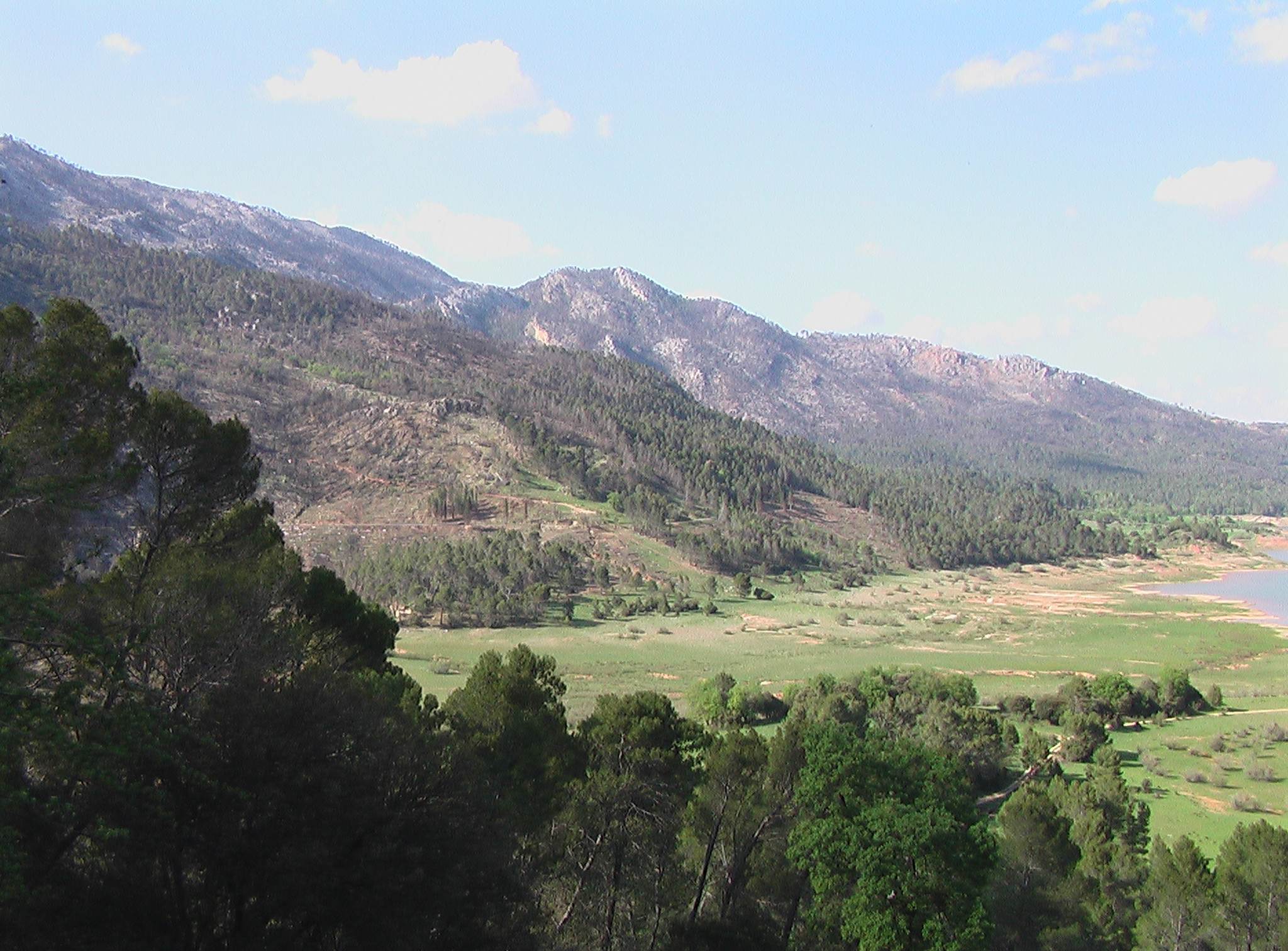
- Landscape in Sierra de Cazorla

Highest point
- Peak: Gilillo
- Elevation: 1,847 m (6,060 ft)
- Coordinates: 37°56′12″N 02°57′30″W

Geography
- Location within Spain
- Location: Jaén Province, Andalusia
- Country: Spain
- Parent range: Prebaetic System

Geology
- Mountain type: Limestone

Climbing
- Easiest route: From Cazorla

Sierra de Cazorla is a mountain range of the Prebaetic System in the Jaén Province in southern Spain. It is named after the town of Cazorla. Its highest point is the 1,847 m high Gilillo peak.

== Geography ==
This mountain range is located between the Sierra Nevada, the Sierra de Segura, and Sierra del Pozo mountain ranges. The easiest route to reach it is from the town of Cazorla.

The Santuario de la Virgen de Tíscar is a shrine dedicated to the Virgin Mary, located on a mountain pass in Sierra de Cazorla.

== See also ==
- Baetic System
- Las Villas
- Sierras de Cazorla, Segura y Las Villas Natural Park
