= Sierra de Callosa =

Mountain range in Spain

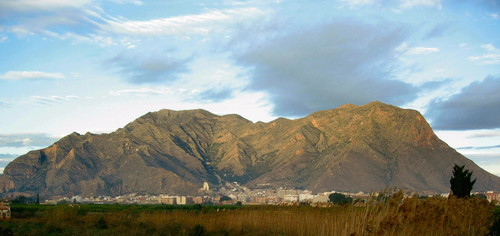

Highest point
- Elevation: 572 m (1,877 ft)
- Coordinates: 38°07′26″N 0°53′46″W

Geography
- Location within Spain
- Location: Vega Baja del Segura, Valencian Community
- Parent range: Cordillera Prebética, Eastern zone

Geology
- Mountain type: karstic

Climbing
- Easiest route: From Callosa de Segura, Cox or Redován

Sierra de Callosa (Valencian: Serra de Callosa) is a 4.6 km (3 mi) long mountain range in the Vega Baja del Segura (Valencian: Baix Segura) comarca, Valencian Community, Spain. Its highest point is Águila (572 m). This range is named after the town of Callosa de Segura located at the feet of the mountains.

These conspicuous and harsh-looking massive limestone mountains rise abruptly from the low Segura River Valley floor and have some very steep cliffs. There is very little vegetation on the arid mountain slopes and both physically and geologically the Sierra de Callosa is similar to the Sierra de Orihuela range located only 2.6 km to the west. Smoother Sierra de Hurchillo is located 6.5 km to the south.

These mountains were declared a Protected Area by the Generalitat Valenciana in 2005.

== See also ==
- Mountains of the Valencian Community
- Sierra de Orihuela
