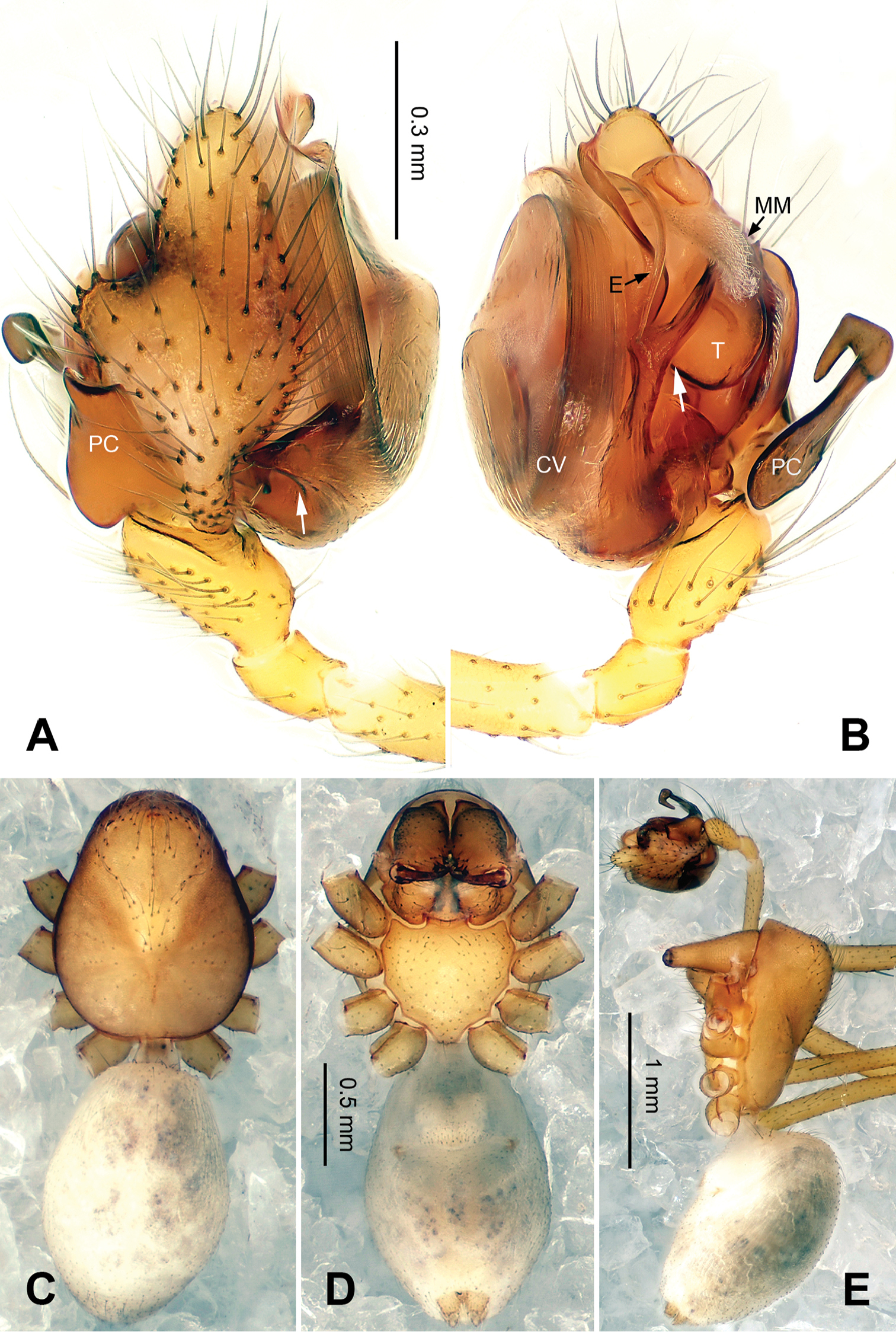
- Callosa ciliata

Scientific classification
- Domain: Eukaryota
- Kingdom: Animalia
- Phylum: Arthropoda
- Subphylum: Chelicerata
- Class: Arachnida
- Order: Araneae
- Infraorder: Araneomorphae
- Family: Linyphiidae
- Genus: Callosa; Zhao & Li, 2017

Species
- Callosa baiseensis Zhao & Li, 2017; Callosa ciliata Zhao & Li, 2017

= Callosa (spider) =

Genus of spiders

Callosa is a genus of East Asian dwarf spiders first described by Q. Y. Zhao & S. Q. Li in 2017. As of April 2019 it contains only two species.
