= Rafael Tegeo =

Spanish painter

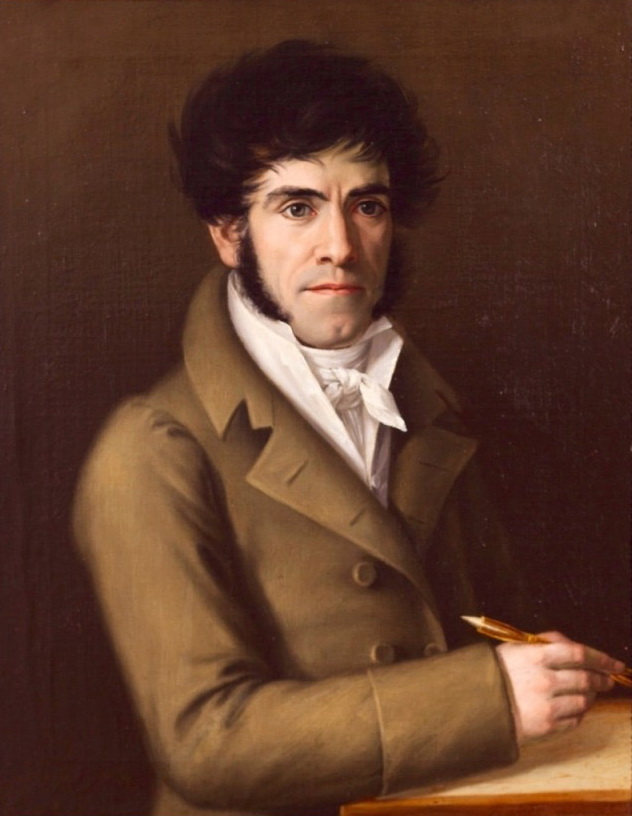
Self-portrait, 1818

Rafael Tegeo Díaz (27 November 1798, Caravaca de la Cruz - 3 October 1856, Madrid) was a Spanish Neoclassical painter, known primarily for his portraits. His name is sometimes spelled Tejeo.

== Biography ==
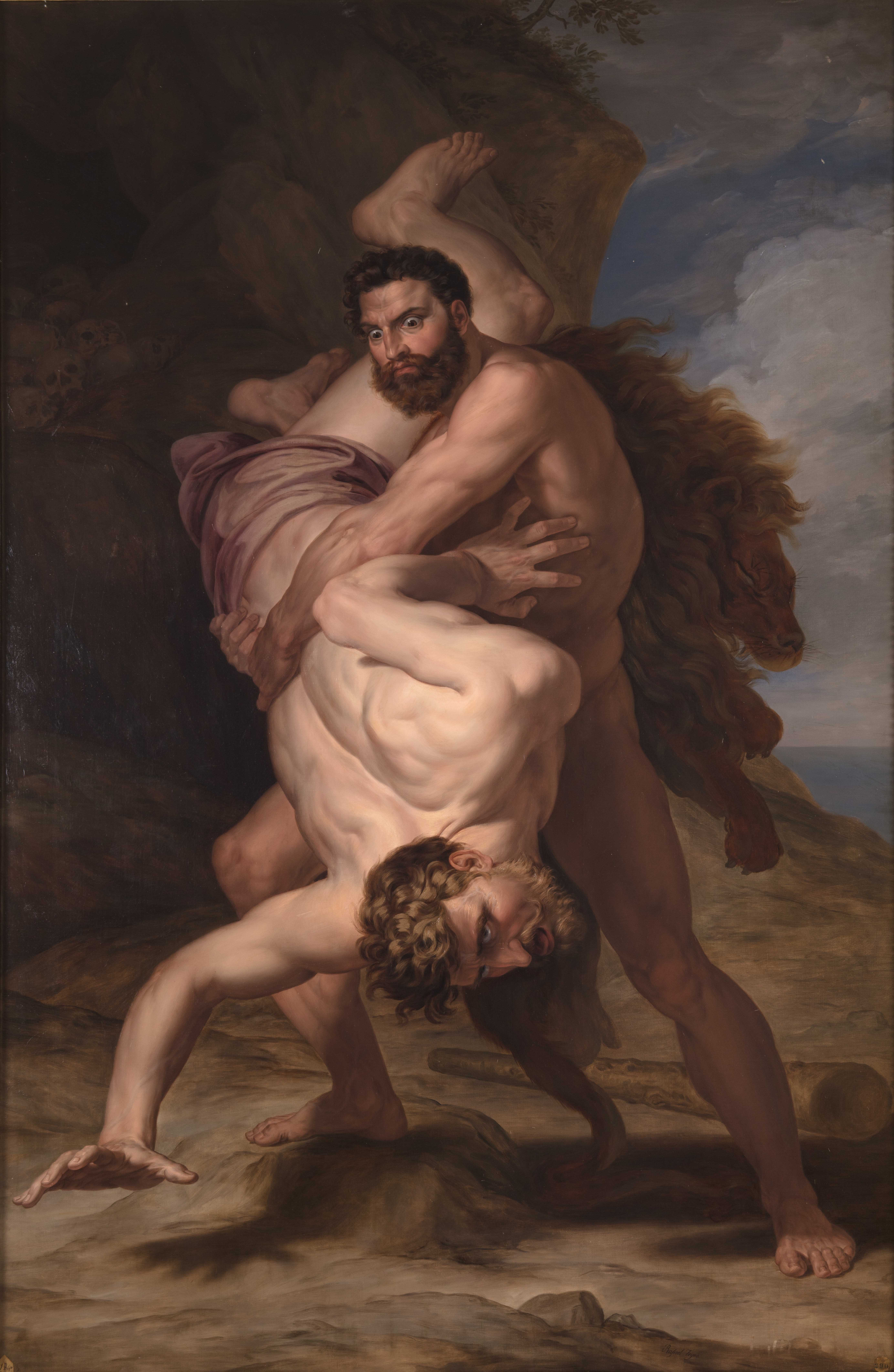
Hercules and Antaeus, 1835-36

He was born to a family of artisans. After displaying an early affinity for drawing, he was enrolled at the "Real Sociedad de Amigos del País" in Murcia, where an Italian sculptor named Santiago Baglietto introduced him to Greek sculpture. Later, thanks to the patronage of the Marqués de San Mamés, he was able to attend the Real Academia de Bellas Artes de San Fernando, where he studied with José Aparicio and Fernando Brambila.

In 1824, he received a stipend to study in Rome with Pietro Benvenuti and Vincenzo Camuccini, among others. While there, he was heavily influenced by the works of Raphael and Guido Reni. He sent numerous paintings home for exhibition and, in 1828, he was named an "Academician" for his painting of Hercules and Antaeus.

Initially, he concentrated on themes from mythology; creating murals at the Palacio Real, the Casino de la Reina and the Palacio de Vista Alegre. He also did the occasional historical scene, notably an episode from the Siege of Málaga in the Palacio Real.

Ultimately, though, he achieved his greatest fame through his portraits. His canvases of Francis, Duke of Cádiz and Queen Isabel II won him an appointment as court painter. He not only painted the nobility, but the emerging bourgeoisie as well. He is also known for a series of posthumous portraits of famous Admirals and other officials related to the Spanish Navy, now at the Museo Naval de Madrid.

In 1839, he was appointed Deputy Director of painting at the Academia and, three years later, became Honorary Director, a position he held until his resignation in 1846. His last major exhibition was at the Exposition Universelle (1855).

The street where he was born was renamed in his honor. In 2015, the Ayuntamiento of Caravaca announced the forthcoming publication of a new book, Rafael Tegeo: Del tema clásico al retrato romántico, by Martín Páez Burruezo (b.1948).

== Selected portraits ==
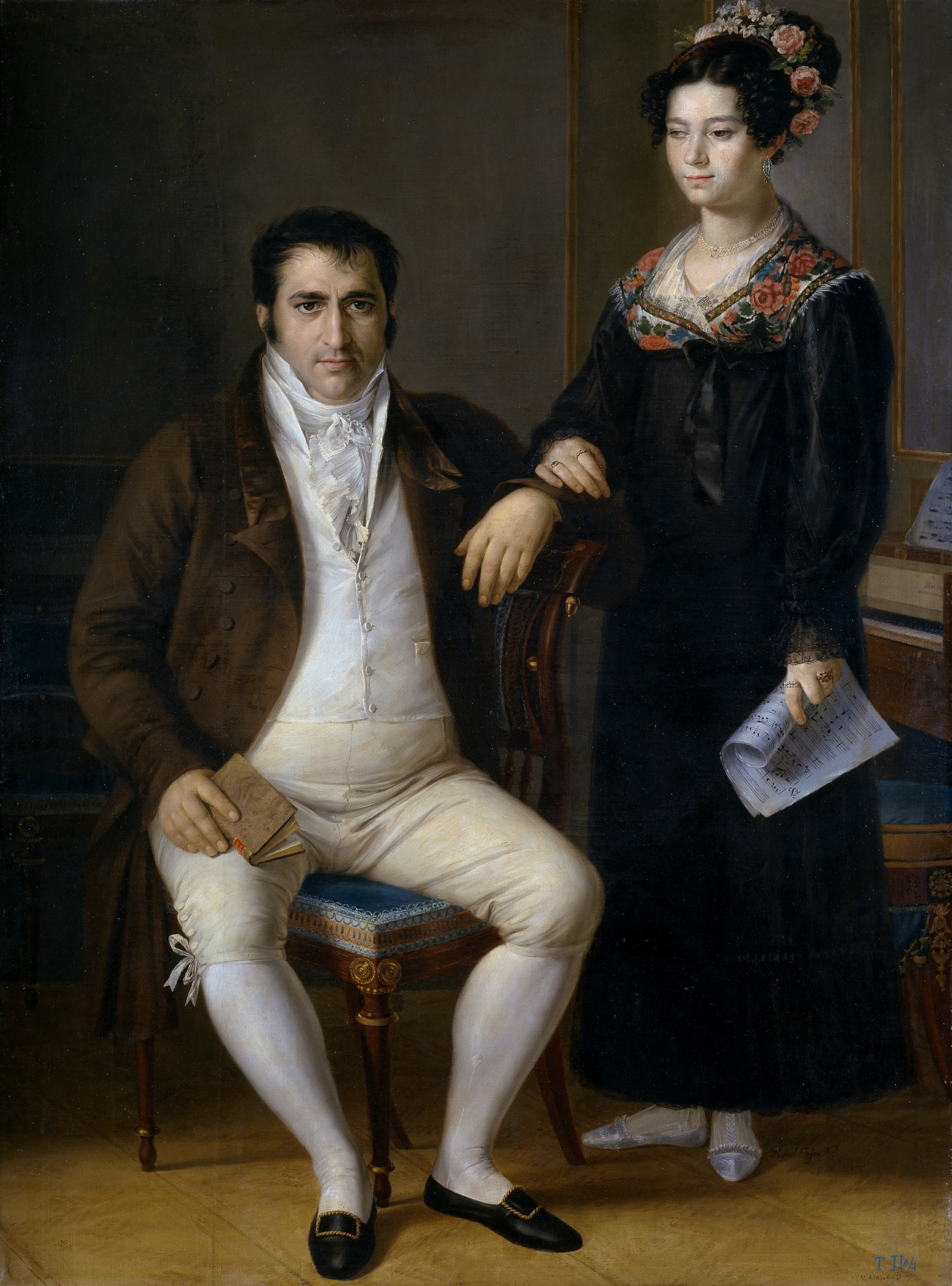
Don Pedro Benítez and
His Daughter María de la Cruz, c.1820

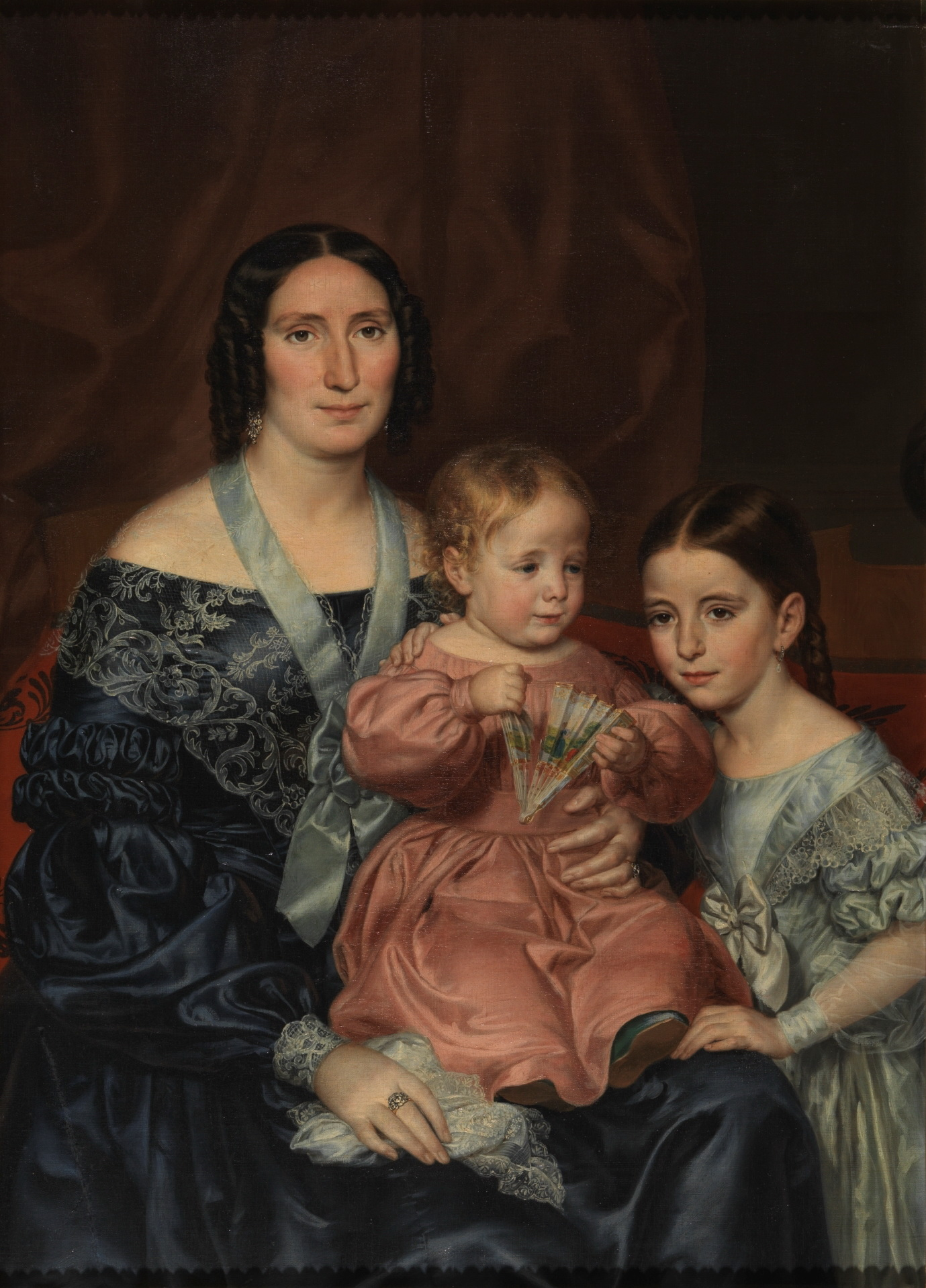
The Barrio Family, 1839

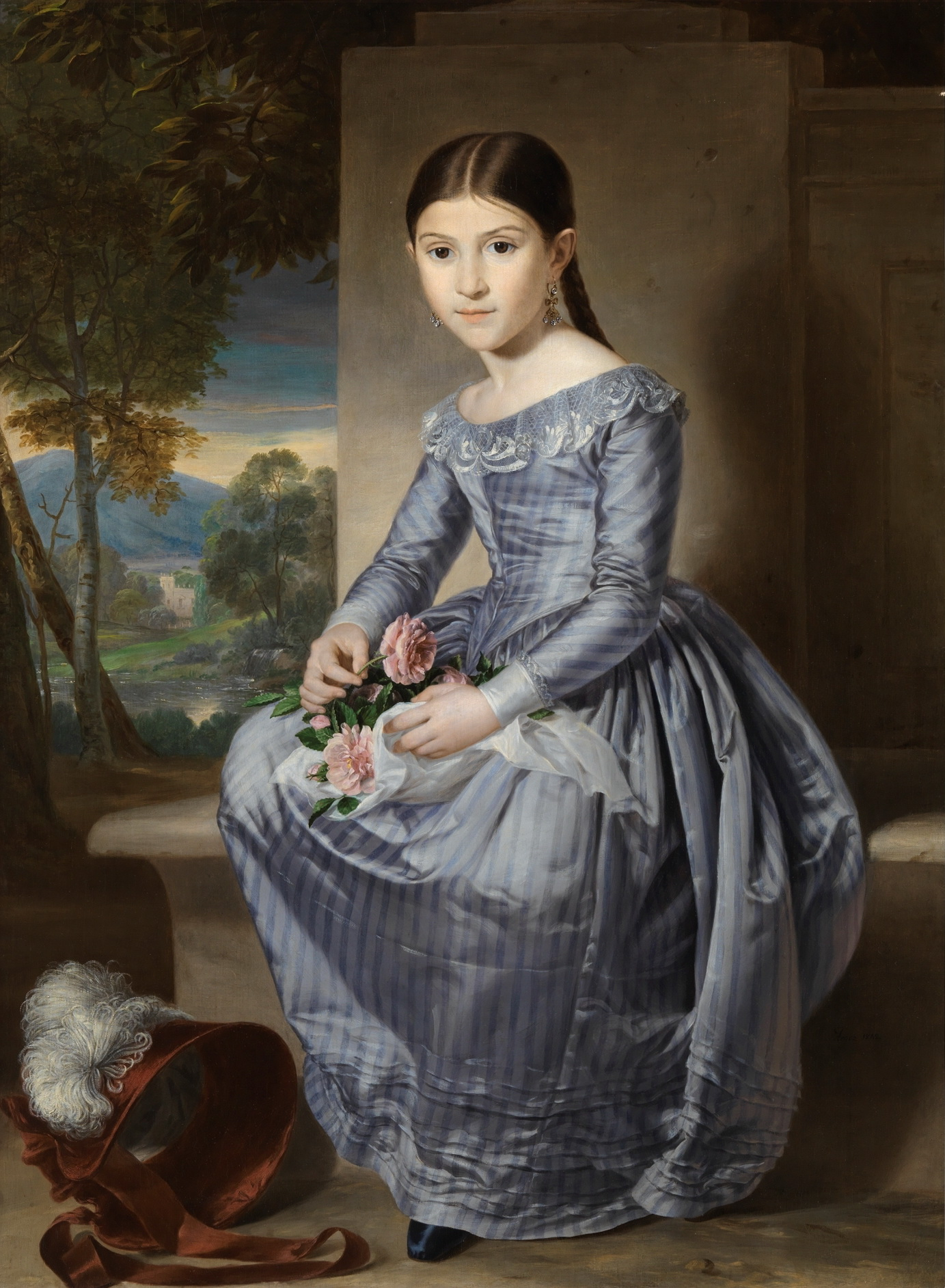
Young Girl with Landscape, 1842

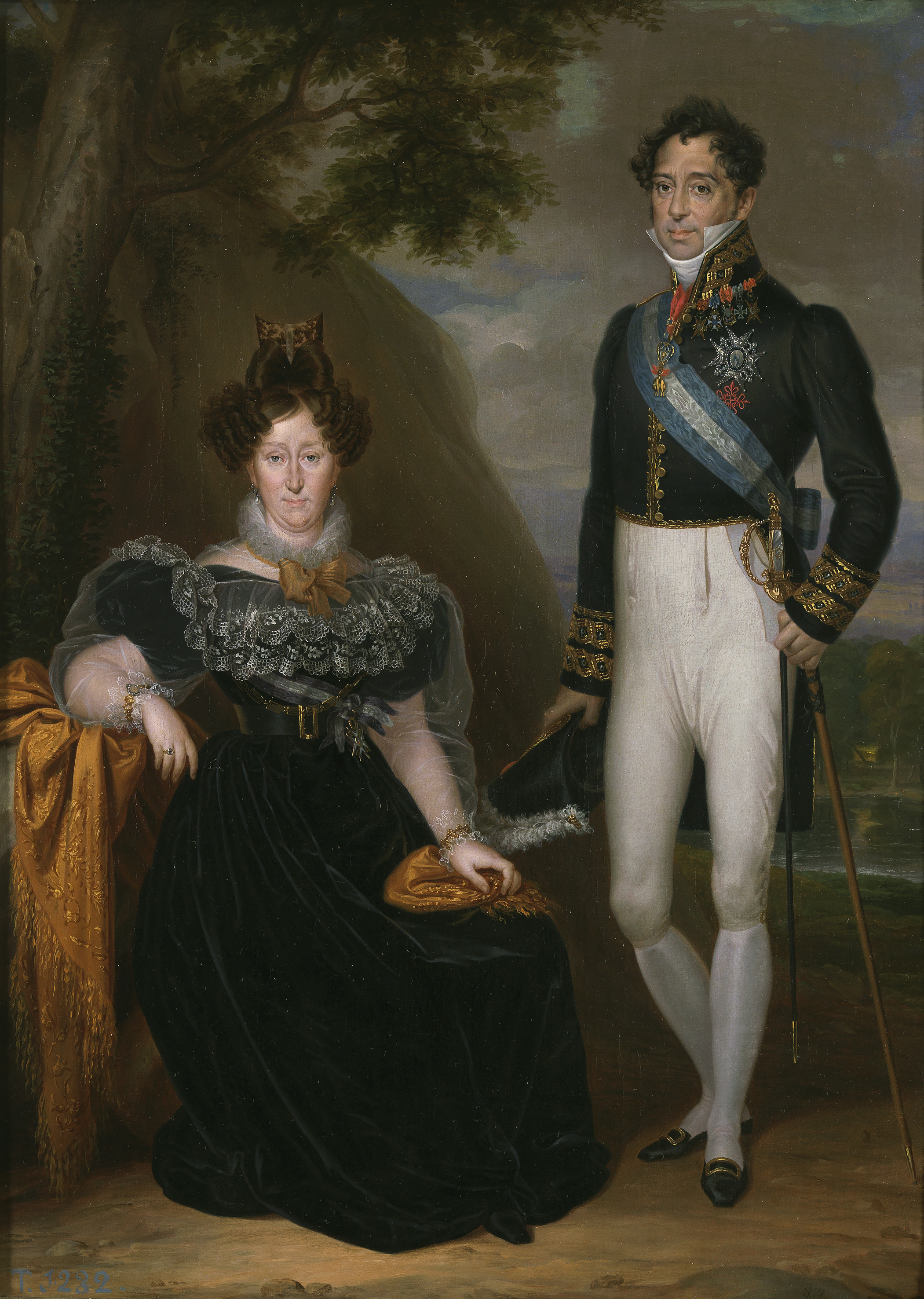
The Duke and Duchess of San Fernando, c.1832
