= Callosa de Segura =

- Municipality
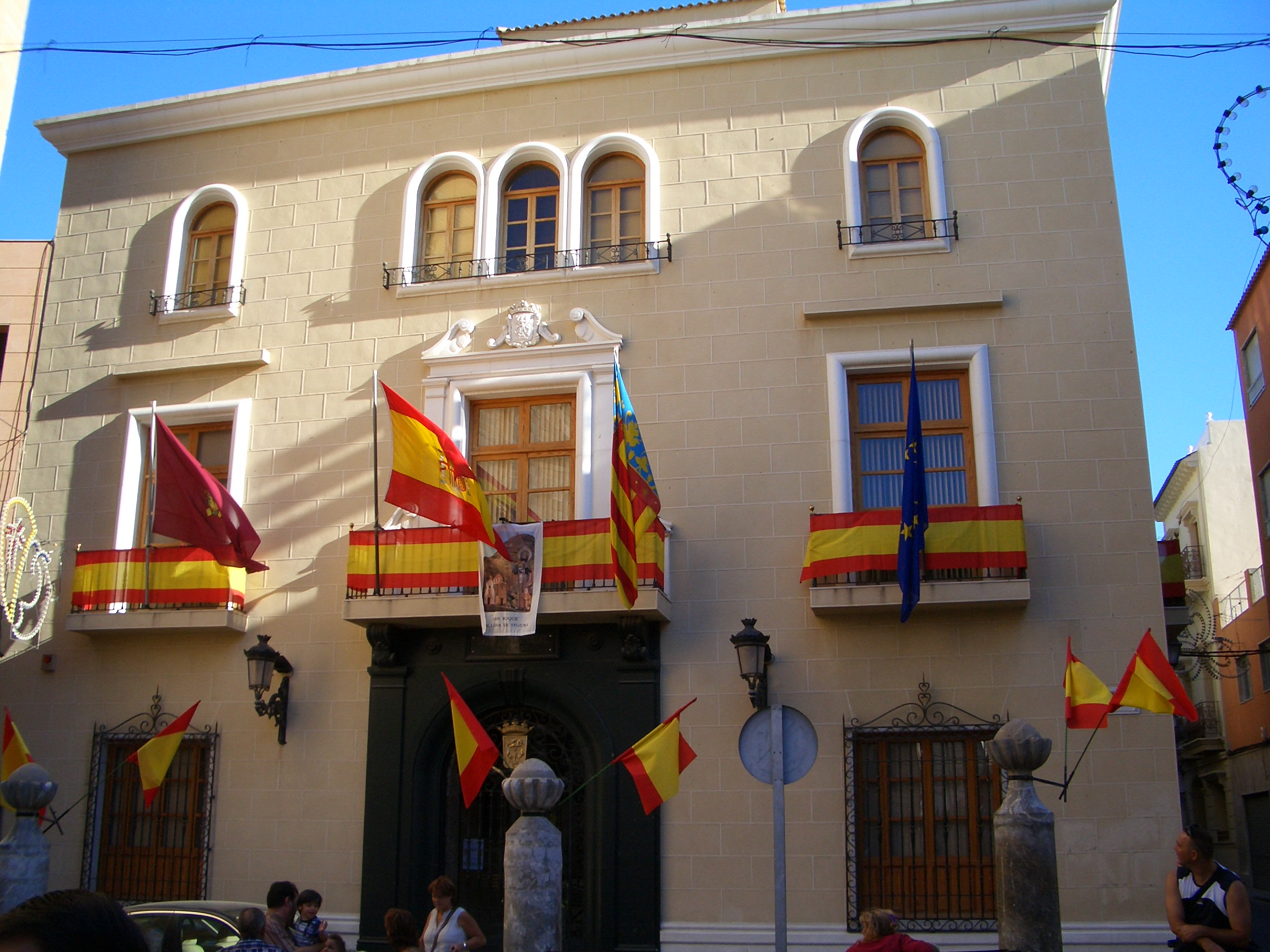
- Town hall

- Flag Coat of arms

- Location in Spain Callosa de Segura (Valencian Community) Callosa de Segura (Spain)
- Coordinates: 38°7′21″N 0°52′47″W
- Country: Spain
- Autonomous community: Valencian Community
- Province: Alicante
- Comarca: Vega Baja del Segura
- Judicial district: Callosa de Segura

Government
  - Mayor: Francisco José Maciá Serna (PSPV-PSOE)

Area
  - Total: 25 km^{2} (9.7 sq mi)
- Elevation: 27 m (89 ft)

Population (2025-01-01)
  - Total: 19,988
  - Density: 800/km^{2} (2,100/sq mi)
- Demonym: Callosinos
- Time zone: UTC+1 (CET)
  - Summer (DST): UTC+2 (CEST)
- Postal code: 03360-03365
- Official language(s): Spanish
- Website: Official website

Callosa de Segura (Spanish pronunciation: [kaˈʎosa ðe seˈɣuɾa]) is a municipality in the comarca of Vega Baja del Segura in the Valencian Community, Spain. It contains the historic monument of the Church of St Martin.

Callosa de Segura is a traditional Spanish-speaking town located north-east of Orihuela. It can be reached via the A-7 (E15) motorway, junction 79, or from the AP-7 motorway, junction 733 and is situated just 30 minutes from Alicante and Murcia airports and 30 minutes from Guardamar beach.

The town is dominated by the Sierra de Callosa mountains standing behind it, and some of the houses of the town creep up the side of the mountain together with various crops high up on terraced slopes.

== Main sights ==
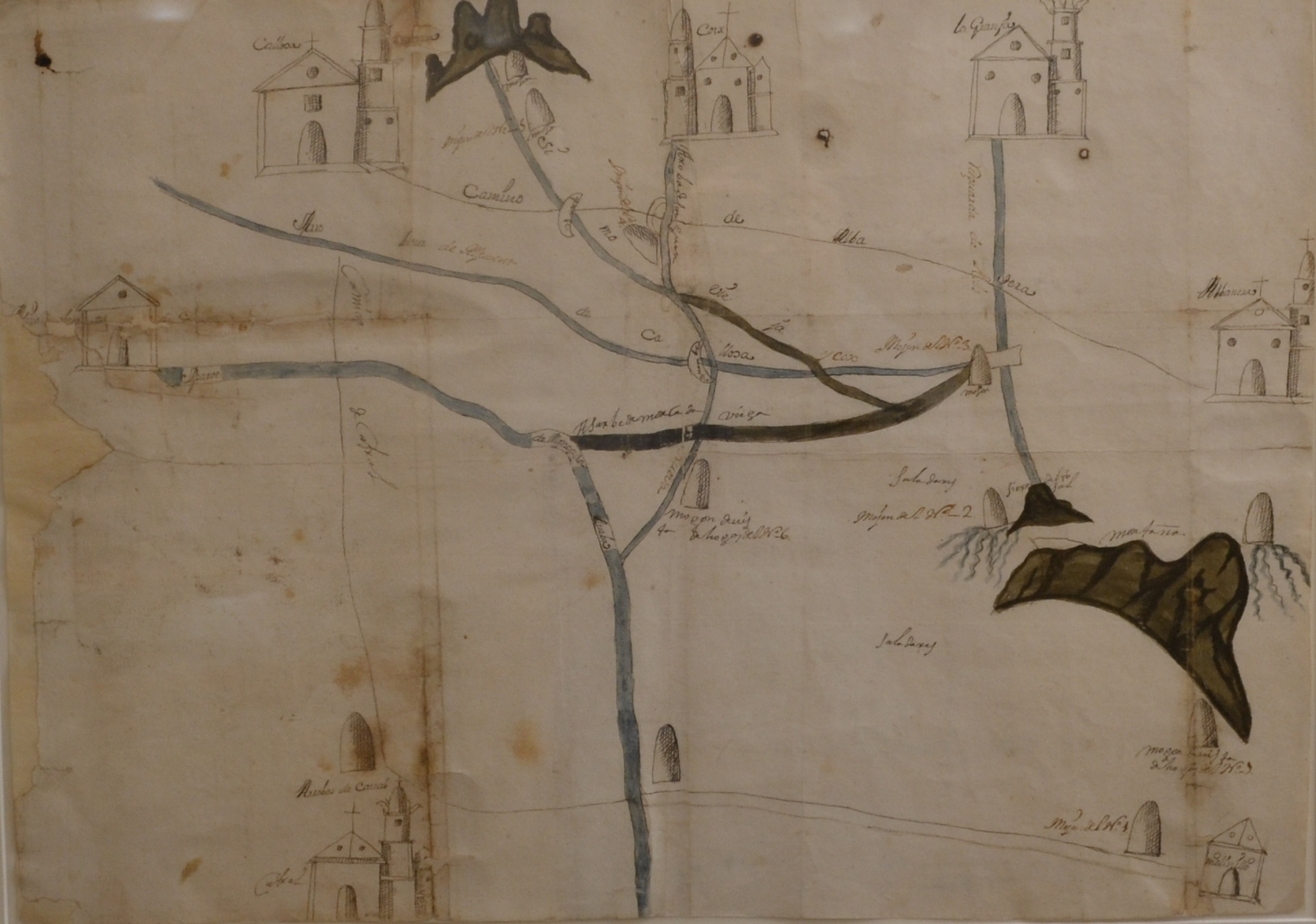
Map of the municipalities of Callosa de Segura, Cox, Albatera and Granja de Rocamora (1729)

The Saint Roque Hermitage stands high above the town as if guarding it; above the hermitage is the castle of Callosa. The hermitage was built in 1579–1798 in honour of the patron saint of Callosa de Segura - Saint Roque, it is said that Saint Roque appeared on the spot where the hermitage is built.

The Saint Martin's Church, dating from the 16th - 18th centuries, has a blue decorated dome. The chapel of the church contains some pieces of gold work by Miguel de Vera. The old part of the town, just below the hermitage, has very narrow streets.

The original town slaughterhouse built in 1929 is now renovated and houses a history museum of the town. The museum has four sections:

- The Archaeological Museum (Antonio Ballester Ruiz) where artefacts can be viewed dating back to the early history of the town, exhibits include funeral trousseaus, urns, copper halberds, coins, glassware and ceramics. There are artefacts from the Neolithic Era, the Argaric culture, the Iberian Culture, the Roman occupation and other more recent ones.
- The Hemp and Agricultural Museum, outlining the history of hemp production, an important part of the town's economy, and showing samples of the many products made from hemp.
- The Holy Week Museum (Santa Semana) containing thrones and images by José Noguera, Hurtado Carré and José Hernández.
- The Fiesta Museum

== Economy ==
The economy of the town is dependent mostly on agriculture and manufacturing; hemp based cordage products being an important part of this.
