= Cox, Spain =

Cox
- Municipality
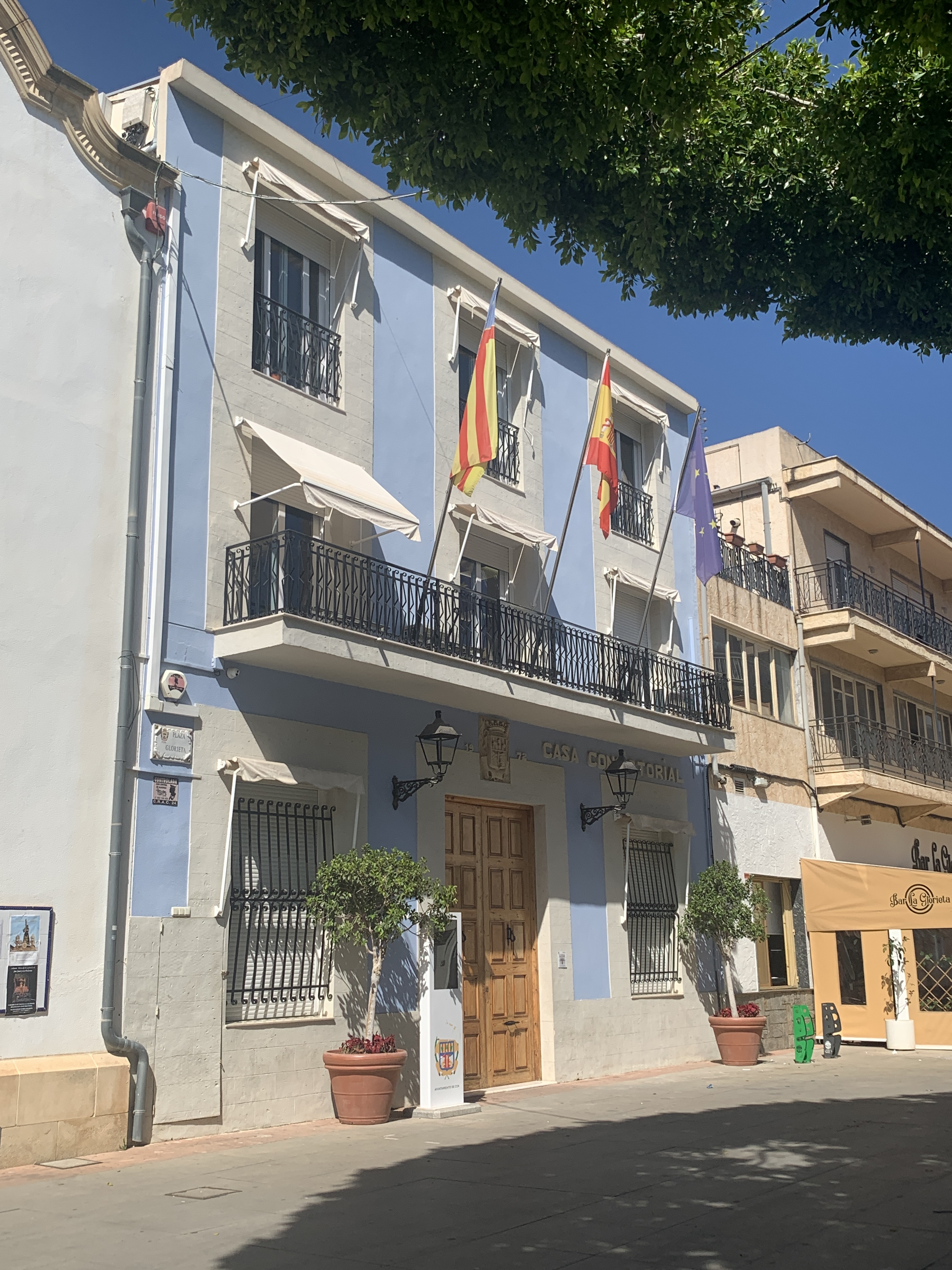
- Town hall

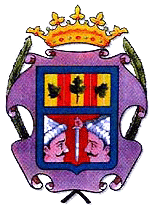
- Coat of arms

- Location in Spain
- Coordinates: 38°8′22″N 0°53′5″W
- Country: Spain
- Autonomous community: Valencian Community
- Province: Alicante
- Comarca: Vega Baja del Segura
- Judicial district: Orihuela

Government
  - Alcalde: Carmelo Rives Fulleda (2007) (PP)

Area
  - Total: 16.6 km^{2} (6.4 sq mi)
- Elevation: 16 m (52 ft)

Population (2025-01-01)
  - Total: 7,722
  - Density: 465/km^{2} (1,200/sq mi)
- Demonym: Coxense
- Time zone: UTC+1 (CET)
  - Summer (DST): UTC+2 (CEST)
- Postal code: 03350
- Official language(s): Spanish

Cox (Spanish: [ko(k)s], locally [kɔ]) is a municipality in the comarca of Vega Baja del Segura in the Valencian Community, Spain.

This town is located at the feet of the Sierra de Callosa mountain range.
