= Alcalá la Real =

- city
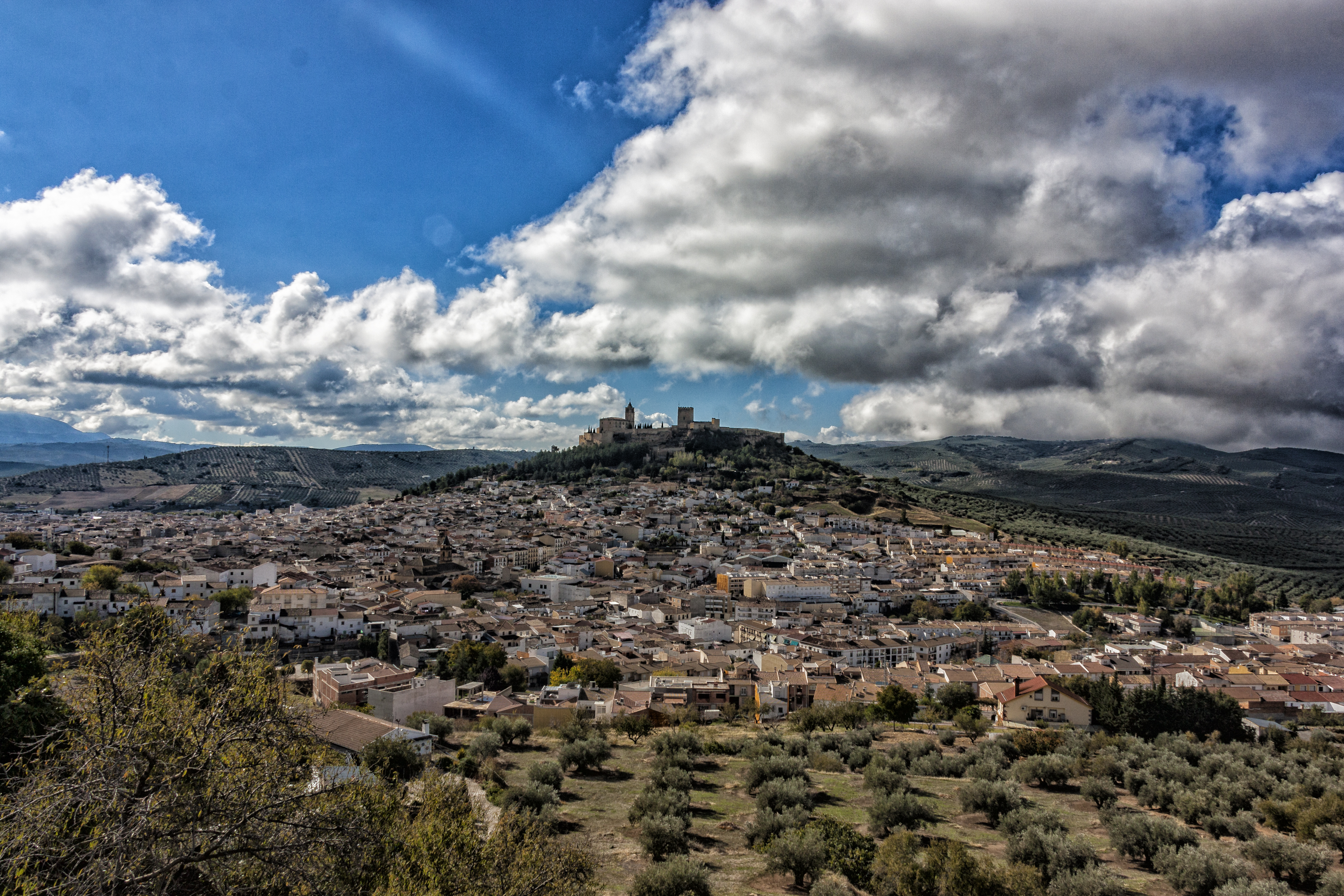
- View of the city

- Coat of arms

- Location in the Province of Jaén Location in Andalusia Location in Spain
- Coordinates: 37°27′N 3°55′W
- Country: Spain
- Province: Jaén
- Comarca: Sierra Sur de Jaén

Government
  - Mayor: Marino Aguilera Peñalver (PP-A)

Area
  - Total: 262 km^{2} (101 sq mi)
- Elevation: 918 m (3,012 ft)

Population (2025-01-01)
  - Total: 21,496
  - Density: 82.0/km^{2} (212/sq mi)
- Demonym: Alcalaínos
- Time zone: UTC+1 (CET)
  - Summer (DST): UTC+2 (CEST)
- Website: Official website

Alcalá la Real is a city in the province of Jaén, Spain. According to the 2024 INE figures, the city had a population of 21,581.

== Geography ==
Alcalá la Real is situated 71 kilometres (44 mi) from the provincial capital, Jaén, and 53 kilometres (33 mi) from Granada, on the slopes of La Mota, a hill in the Sierra Sur. It has an area of 261.36 km^{2} (100.91 sq mi). The town is dominated by a large Moorish fortress around which, some centuries ago, the settlement evolved. Alcalá la Real is connected to the Guadalquivir valley via the Guadajoz tributary.

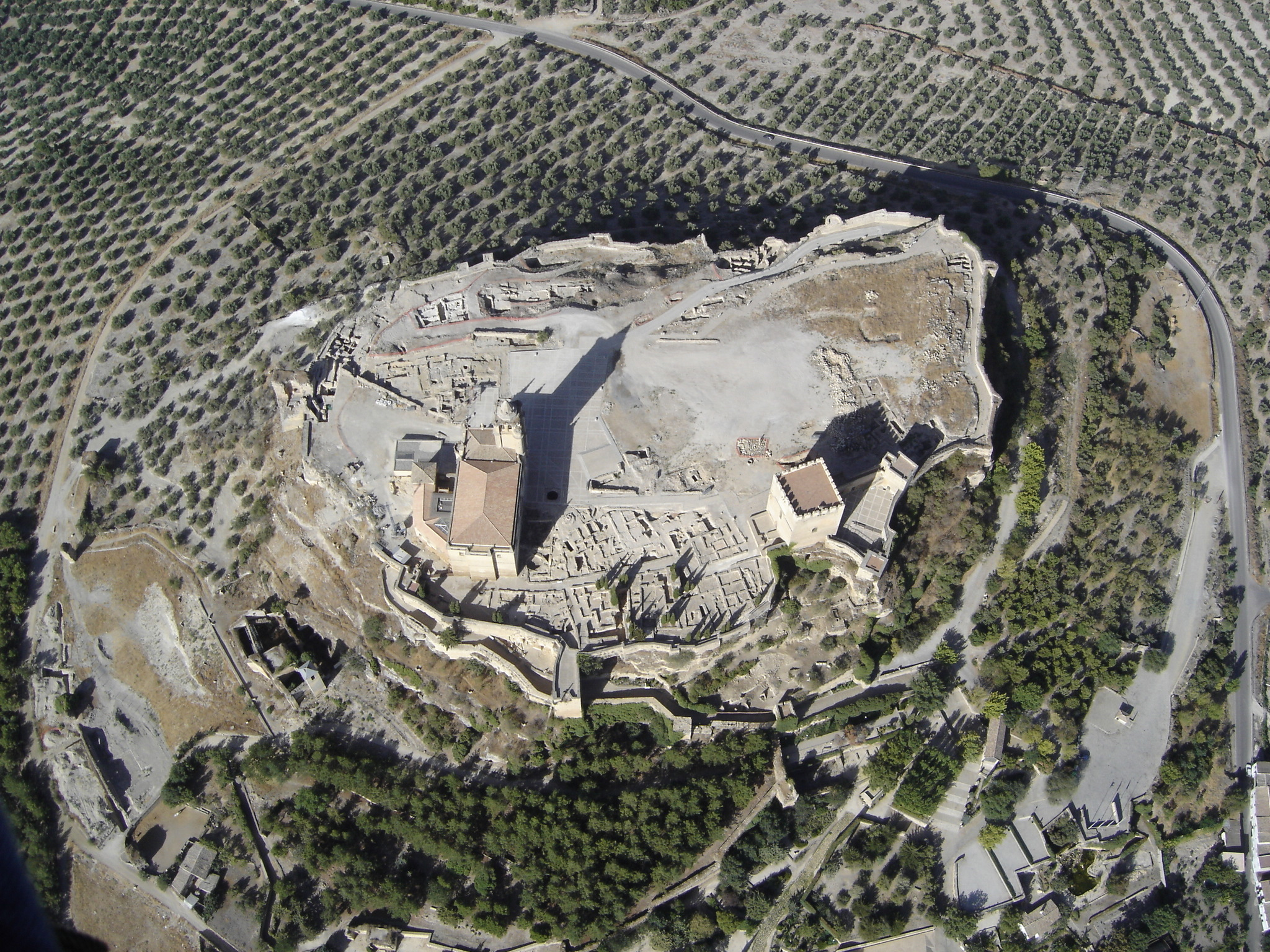
Aerial view of the La Mota fortress

== History ==
Remains from the Palaeolithic to the Bronze Age show a human presence in the area in prehistoric times. It has been hypothesized that this was one of the last places inhabited by Neanderthal man. Despite the presence of remains from the Iberians, dating to the late Bronze Age, the first traces of urban structures (perhaps identifiable with the ancient Sucaelo) date to the Roman times. Archaeological findings include a marble statue of Hercules, now in the National Archaeological Museum of Spain at Madrid.

After the Muslim conquest in 713, the town was renamed Qal'at (قلعة), an Arabic term meaning "fortified city". In the following centuries, Umayyad caliph Al-Hakam II (971–976) had a series of watchtowers built to defend the city from the Viking/Norman incursions; today 12 of the 15 original towers remain. Around the year 1000 the principal tower, the Mota, became a true fortress, one of the mainstays of the Al-Andalus defence against the Christian Reconquista. In the 12th century it was the fief of the Banu Said family, and became known as Qal'at Banu Said, or Alcalá de Benzaide in Christian sources.

After the dissolution of the caliphate and its fragmentation in a series of taifa small kingdoms, Qa'lat was a stronghold of the Kingdom of Granada. From here numerous raids were launched against Jaén and other frontier areas of the Kingdom of Castile. The city was finally captured on 15 August 1341 by Alfonso XI of Castile, who granted it the title Real (Royal), which after that was part of its name.

Alcalá remained under the jurisdiction of Jorquera until 1364, when king Peter I gave it the privilege of a Government Council, under the royal crown and the state of Villena. It was elevated to the rank of city in 1432 by king John II. After a flourishing period, the conquest of Granada in 1492 stripped Alcalá of its strategic importance. The population started to move from the upper hill to the now safer slopes, thus gradually creating the current settlement. The city remained under the marquesses of Villena until the early 16th century, when the centralism introduced by the Catholic Monarchs started to reduce the power of the barons, although the marquisate remained in existence until the 19th century. The depopulation of the La Mota hill ended after the Peninsular War against the Napoleonic troops who occupied the fortress from 1810 and 1812. On retreat the Napoleonic forces set fire to the upper city, resulting in partial destruction of the Abbey Church.

During the Spanish Civil War, Alcalá was taken by the Nationalists, who held it until the end of the conflict. The city suffered considerable destruction, due to its vicinity to the hostilities.

== Main sights ==
- La Mota fortress, of Islamic origin, on the hill with the same name
- Alcazaba, a fortified precinct with a triangular shape, with three towers
- Murallas, a line of walls with several towers,
- Palacio Abacial (18th century), now housing the Museum of Alcalà la Real
- Pilar de la calle Oteros, a monumental plinth for water from 1746
- Pilar de la Mora
- Pilar de los Álamos (1552)
- Pilar de la Toquela (1517)
- Roman bridge on the Guadalcoton river, nearby the city
- Batmale House (Early 19th century)
- Casa Pineda, a Muslim edifice in stone, recently restored
- Ayuntamiento (Town Hall)
- Convent of san José de los Capucinos (17th century), now housing municipal offices and a library
- Iglesia Mayor Abacial (main Abbey church) with towers, built in 1530
- Church of San Domingo de Silos, in Gothic-mudéjar style (1341), with a 16th-century tower
- Church of San Juan (15th-18th centuries)
- Iglesia de las Angustias ("Church of the Pains") from 1747.
- Iglesia de Consolación (16th-17th centuries)
- Church of San Antonio (1753)
- Convento de la Encarnación (1630), in Baroque style

== Economy ==
The economy is mostly based on olives and oil production. Other resources include cherries, shepherding, craftsmanship, plastic industry and metalworks.

The city's economy is growing at reduced speed if compared to the neighbouring towns, and numerous young people from Alcalá la Real move to Granada in search of jobs.

== Twin towns ==
- Lohfelden, Germany
- Figueres, Spain since 1989 in connection with Pep Ventura, who modernized the sardana and it subsequently became the traditional dance of Catalonia. He was born in Alcalá la Real in 1817.

== See also ==
- List of municipalities in Jaén
