= Sierra Sur de Jaén =

Mountain range in Andalusia, Spain

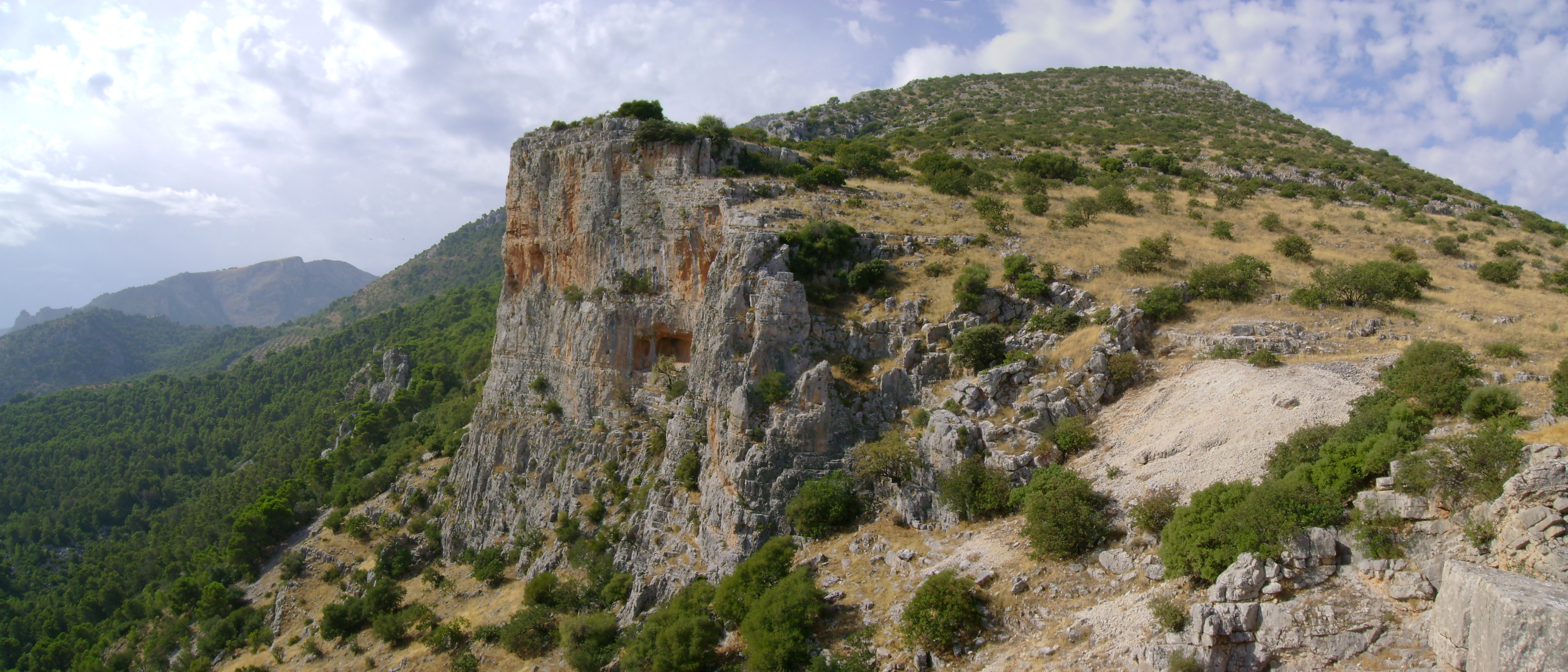
- View of the Cueva de los Soles in Otíñar

Highest point
- Peak: Pico Pandera
- Elevation: 1,872 m (6,142 ft)

Dimensions
- Length: 48 km (30 mi) ENE/WSW
- Width: 15 km (9.3 mi) NNW/SSE

Geography
- Location within Spain
- Location: Andalusia
- Country: Spain
- Range coordinates: 37°38′0″N 3°46′0″W
- Parent range: Subbaetic System/Prebaetic System

Geology
- Orogeny: Alpine orogeny
- Rock age: Cenozoic
- Rock type(s): Granite, schist, slate and quartzite

The Sierra Sur de Jaén (Southern Range of Jaén) is a mountain range that is part of the central belt of the Baetic System, Andalusia, Spain. Its name derives from its location in the southwestern part of Jaén Province. The highest summit in the range is 1,872 m high Pico Pandera; 1,722 m high Cerro de la Cruz is another notable peak.

This range gives its name to an administrative comarca in the region, the Sierra Sur de Jaén Comarca, as well as to the wine of the area, the Sierra Sur de Jaén (DO).

== Geography ==
The Sierra Sur de Jaén is located in the area where the Subbaetic System is overlapping with the Prebaetic System. The latter begins east of Martos.

The Sierra Sur includes the subranges of Sierra de la Pandera, the Sierra de Ventisqueros, the Sierra del Trigo and the Sierra Caracolera, among others. The neighboring range of Sierra Mágina is located to the east of Sierra Sur de Jaén.

Most of the lower slopes and intermontane basins of the range are covered with olive groves. Some of the undisturbed higher slopes and hidden valleys of the mountains have preserved the original Mediterranean forest cover with Yew, Portuguese Oak, Holm Oak and Juniper trees. The highest altitudes of the range are mostly denuded of forest and thorny shrubland predominates. The mountaintops are usually covered with snow in the winter.

Otíñar is a zone of the range that includes ancient ruins and caves set in valleys among relatively unspoilt wilderness. It was declared Bien de Interés Cultural in 2009.

=== Geology ===
The ranges of the Sierra Sur de Jaén, as well as the Sierra de Segura were formed during the Mesozoic. The geological materials that compose them were formed in a relatively shallow sea and are mainly made up of Cenozoic sedimentary rocks, including limestone, dolomite and marl.

Towards the east of the Sierra Sur de Jaén another mountainous subsystem begins, the Prebaetic System, an offshoot of the Subbaetic System stretching further northeastwards.

== See also ==
- Baetic System
- Sierra Sur de Jaén Comarca
- Geography of Spain
- Geology of the Iberian Peninsula
