= Akushali =

Akushali Акушали Гӏахъушали
- Selo
- Location within Republic of Dagestan Location within Russia
- Coordinates: 42°29′N 46°57′E
- Country: Russia
- Region: Republic of Dagestan
- District: Gergebilsky District
- Time zone: UTC+3:00

Akushali (Russian: Акушали; Avar: Гӏахъушали) is a rural locality (a selo) in Kukuninsky Selsoviet, Gergebilsky District, Republic of Dagestan, Russia. The population was 55 as of 2010.

== Geography ==
Akushali is located 21 km west of Gergebil (the district's administrative centre) by road. Maali and Murada are the nearest rural localities.
