= Khvartikuni =

Khvartikuni Хвартикуни Хъвартихьуни
- Selo
- Location within Republic of Dagestan Location within Russia
- Coordinates: 42°27′N 47°00′E
- Country: Russia
- Region: Republic of Dagestan
- District: Gergebilsky District
- Time zone: UTC+3:00

Khvartikuni (Russian: Хвартикуни; Avar: Хъвартихьуни) is a rural locality (a selo) and the administrative centre of Khvartikuninsky Selsoviet, Gergebilsky District, Republic of Dagestan, Russia. The population was 1,323 as of 2010. There are 12 streets.

== Geography ==
Khvartikuni is located 10 km southwest of Gergebil (the district's administrative centre) by road. Kurmi and Khvarada are the nearest rural localities.
