= Darada, Republic of Dagestan =

Darada Дарада
- Selo
- Location within Republic of Dagestan Location within Russia
- Coordinates: 42°27′N 46°56′E
- Country: Russia
- Region: Republic of Dagestan
- District: Gergebilsky District
- Time zone: UTC+3:00

Darada (Russian: Дарада) is a rural locality (a selo) in Darada-Muradinsky Selsoviet, Gergebilsky District, Republic of Dagestan, Russia. The population was 217 as of 2010. There are 6 streets.

== Geography ==
Darada is located 24 km southwest of Gergebil (the district's administrative centre) by road. Maali and Murada are the nearest rural localities.
