= Iputa =

Iputa Ипута Ипутӏа
- Selo
- Location within Republic of Dagestan Location within Russia
- Coordinates: 42°28′N 46°57′E
- Country: Russia
- Region: Republic of Dagestan
- District: Gergebilsky District
- Time zone: UTC+3:00

Iputa (Russian: Ипута; Avar: Ипутӏа) is a rural locality (a selo) in Kukuninsky Selsoviet, Gergebilsky District, Republic of Dagestan, Russia. The population was 98 as of 2010.

== Geography ==
Iputa is located 19 km southwest of Gergebil (the district's administrative centre) by road. Maali and Darada are the nearest rural localities.
