= Murada =

Murada is a surname. Notable people with the surname include:

- Giulia Murada (born 1998), Italian ski mountaineer
- Ivan Murada (born 1965), Italian ski mountaineer

== See also ==
- La Murada, village in Spain
- Murada, Republic of Dagestan, rural locality
