= Aymaki =

Aymaki Аймаки Гӏаймаки
- Selo
- Location within Republic of Dagestan Location within Russia
- Coordinates: 42°32′N 47°08′E
- Country: Russia
- Region: Republic of Dagestan
- District: Gergebilsky District
- Time zone: UTC+3:00

Aymaki (Russian: Аймаки; Avar: Гӏаймаки) is a rural locality (a selo) in Gergebilsky District, Republic of Dagestan, Russia. The population was 2,342 as of 2010. There are 14 streets.

== Geography ==
Aymaki is located 11 km northeast of Gergebil (the district's administrative centre) by road. Akhkent and Okli are the nearest rural localities.
