= Khvarada =

Khvarada Хварада Хъварада
- Selo
- Location within Republic of Dagestan Location within Russia
- Coordinates: 42°28′N 46°59′E
- Country: Russia
- Region: Republic of Dagestan
- District: Gergebilsky District
- Time zone: UTC+3:00

Khvarada (Russian: Хварада; Avar: Хъварада) is a rural locality (a selo) in Khvartikuninsky Selsoviet, Gergebilsky District, Republic of Dagestan, Russia. The population was 43 as of 2010. There are three streets.

== Geography ==
Khvarada is located 15 km southwest of Gergebil (the district's administrative centre) by road. Khvartikuni and Kurmi are the nearest rural localities.
