= Maali, Republic of Dagestan =

Maali Маали Магӏлиб
- Selo
- Location within Republic of Dagestan Location within Russia
- Coordinates: 42°29′N 46°55′E
- Country: Russia
- Region: Republic of Dagestan
- District: Gergebilsky District
- Time zone: UTC+3:00

Maali (Russian: Маали; Avar: Магӏлиб) is a rural locality (a selo) in Gergebilsky District, Republic of Dagestan, Russia. The population was 2,923 as of 2010. There are 41 streets.

== Geography ==
Maali is located 22 km southwest of Gergebil (the district's administrative centre) by road. Karadakh and Murada are the nearest rural localities.
