= Tunzi =

Tunzi Тунзи Тунзиб
- Selo
- Location within Republic of Dagestan Location within Russia
- Coordinates: 42°28′N 46°58′E
- Country: Russia
- Region: Republic of Dagestan
- District: Gergebilsky District
- Time zone: UTC+3:00

Tunzi (Russian: Тунзи; Avar: Тунзиб) is a rural locality (a selo) in Khvartikuninsky Selsoviet, Gergebilsky District, Republic of Dagestan, Russia. The population was 139 as of 2010. There are 2 streets.

== Geography ==
Tunzi is located 16 km southwest of Gergebil (the district's administrative centre) by road. Kvarada and Iputa are the nearest rural localities.
