= Chalda =

Chalda Чалда ЧІалда
- Selo
- Location within Republic of Dagestan Location within Russia
- Coordinates: 42°32′N 46°55′E
- Country: Russia
- Region: Republic of Dagestan
- District: Gergebilsky District
- Time zone: UTC+3:00

Chalda (Russian: Чалда; Avar: ЧІалда) is a rural locality (a selo) in Gergebilsky District, Republic of Dagestan, Russia. The population was 302 as of 2010. There are 7 streets.

== Geography ==
Chalda is located 16 km northwest of Gergebil (the district's administrative centre) by road, on the left bank of the Avarskoye Koysu. Mogokh and Gotsatl Bolshoy are the nearest rural localities.
