= Siege of Jerez =

Siege of Jerez may refer to:

- Siege of Jerez (1261): Castile captures Jerez from the local Muslim ruler
- Siege of Jerez (1264): Castile recaptures Jerez from a Mudéjar revolt
- Siege of Jerez (1285): Marinid siege lfited by a Castilian relief force
