= Mogokh =

Mogokh Могох Могьо́хъ
- Selo
- Location within Republic of Dagestan Location within Russia
- Coordinates: 42°33′N 46°55′E
- Country: Russia
- Region: Republic of Dagestan
- District: Gergebilsky District
- Time zone: UTC+3:00

Mogokh (Russian: Могох; Avar: Могьо́хъ) is a rural locality (a selo) and the administrative centre of Mogokhsky Selsoviet, Gergebilsky District, Republic of Dagestan, Russia. The population was 274 as of 2010. There are 16 streets.

== Geography ==
Mogokh is located 17 km northwest of Gergebil (the district's administrative centre) by road. Chalda and Maydanskoye are the nearest rural localities.
