= Murada, Republic of Dagestan =

Murada Мурада
- Selo
- Location within Republic of Dagestan Location within Russia
- Coordinates: 42°26′N 46°57′E
- Country: Russia
- Region: Republic of Dagestan
- District: Gergebilsky District
- Time zone: UTC+3:00

Murada (Russian: Мурада) is a rural locality (a selo) and the administrative centre of Darada-Muradinsky Selsoviet, Gergebilsky District, Republic of Dagestan, Russia. The population was 1,560 as of 2010. There are 14 streets.

== Geography ==
Murada is located 17 km southwest of Gergebil (the district's administrative centre) by road. Khvartikuni and Maali are the nearest rural localities.
