= Mudéjar revolt =

Mudéjar may refer to:

- Multiple Mudéjar revolts in the Kingdom of Valencia between 1240 and 1280
- Mudéjar revolt of 1264–1266, in parts of Castile
- Rebellion of the Alpujarras (1499–1501), by the Mudéjars in the Kingdom of Granada
