= Mudéjar revolt of 1264–1266 =

Revolt by Muslim communities in Castile

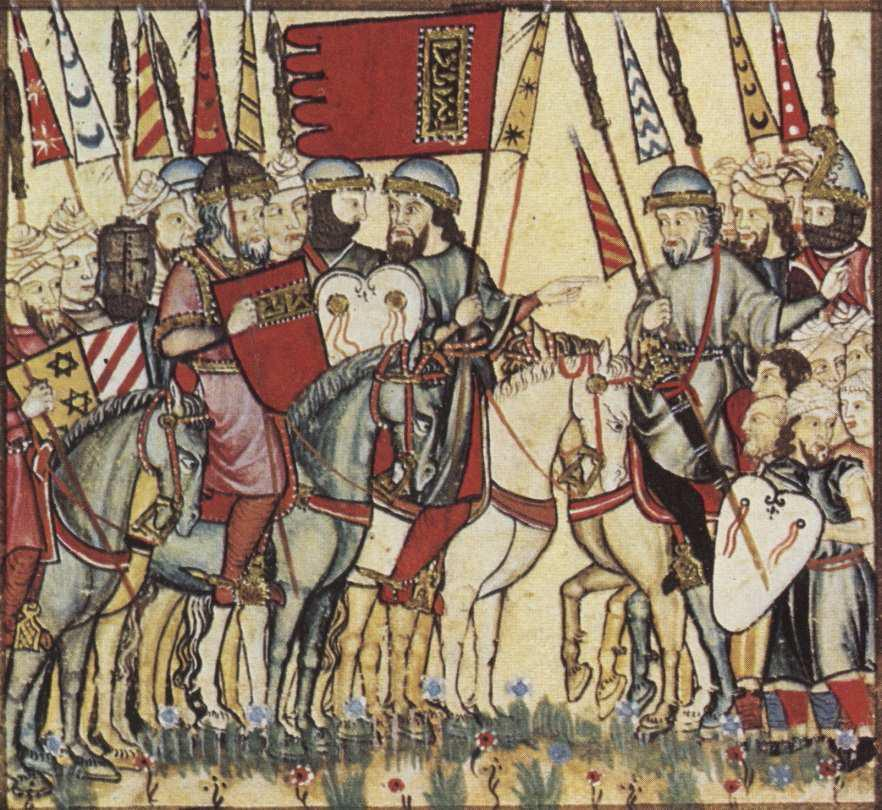
- Muhammad I of Granada (in red tunic and shield) leading his troops during the rebellion, illustrated in the contemporary Cantigas de Santa Maria
Date	1264–1266 or 1267
Location	Lower Andalusia and Murcia, Crown of Castile; the Emirate of Granada
Result	Rebellion defeated; Expulsion of Muslim populations; Payment of tribute from Granada to Castile

Belligerents
Castile: Taifa of Murcia (–1265); Aragon; Order of Calatrava; Order of Santiago; Banu Ashqilula (1266–)	Mudéjar rebels: Taifa of Murcia (1265–); Emirate of Granada: Banu Ashqilula (–1266)

Commanders and leaders
(Kingdom of Castile) Alfonso X of Castile; Al-Wathiq of Murcia; James I of Aragon	Unknown Mudéjar leader(s); Muhammad I of Granada; Abu Muhammad ibn Ashqilula

The Mudéjar revolt of 1264–1266 was a rebellion (Note: "The term 'Mudejar Rebellion' appears commonly in scholarship, but its utility and accuracy is questionable. Many scholars point out that the states involved were incompletely subjugated and maintained governments to manage their internal affairs, or, in the case of Granada, were not vassals to Castile. These communities were not 'Mudejars,' in the sense that they had chosen to remain under Christian rule, nor were they in a state of rebellion since they had not been conquered. Their combined uprising instead created the conditions that typified the Mudejar experience and the lasting antagonism between Granada and Castile." (Minnema 2020)) by the Muslim populations (Mudéjares) in the Lower Andalusia and Murcia regions of the Crown of Castile. The rebellion was in response to Castile's policy of relocating Muslim populations from these regions and was partially instigated by Muhammad I of Granada. The rebels were aided by the independent Emirate of Granada, while the Castilians were allied with Aragon. Early in the uprising, the rebels managed to capture Murcia and Jerez, as well as several smaller towns, but were eventually defeated by the royal forces. Subsequently, Castile expelled the Muslim populations of the reconquered territories and encouraged Christians from elsewhere to settle their lands. Granada became a vassal of Castile and paid an annual tribute.

== Background ==
A rebellion occurred during the Reconquista, the centuries-long conquest of territories held by Muslims in the Iberian peninsula (called Al-Andalus by the Muslims) by Christian kingdoms from the northern part of Iberia. Islam had been present in Iberia since the Umayyad conquest in the eighth century. At the beginning of the twelfth century, the Muslim population in the peninsula was estimated to number up to 5.6 million, among whom were Arabs, Berbers and indigenous converts. In the following centuries, the Christian kingdoms steadily grew in strength and territories while the Muslim ones declined. The early thirteenth century was a period of great loss for the Muslims. The Almohad Caliphate, which had dominated Muslim Iberia, fell into dynastic struggles after Yusuf II died in 1224 without heir. Al-Andalus disintegrated into multiple small kingdoms or taifas. Meanwhile, Ferdinand III united the Christian kingdoms of Castile and León in 1231, and taking advantage of the Muslims' disunity, conquered various territories in the south. His conquests during this period included the Guadalquivir basin (also known as Lower Andalusia) and Murcia, which became the principal centers of this rebellion.

On 2 April 1243, the city of Murcia surrendered to Infante Alfonso (future Alfonso X), after which it became a semi-independent vassal of Castile. Jerez, one of the remaining Muslim enclaves in Andalusia, surrendered in 1261 after a month long siege. Alfonso X had ascended to the throne in 1252 by which time, according to historian L. P. Harvey, Muslim subjects could be broadly classified into two groups: those from Old and New Castile, who had lived for several centuries under stable Castilian rule, in well-established communities, and had rights that were enshrined in the charters of their home towns or cities, and those from areas conquered in the thirteenth century, who suffered from political instability. Many were relocated by their Christian conquerors or had migrated to Muslim-ruled Granada and, in some rare cases, to North Africa. The relocation policies were considered oppressive by the Muslim population and led to a protest being presented to the Pope. These policies were a major factor in the outbreak of the rebellion.

In the south of the Iberian peninsula, the Emirate of Granada emerged under the rule of Muhammad I ibn al-Ahmar. In 1246, he agreed to pay tribute and swear fealty to Castile (then under Alfonso's father Ferdinand III) in exchange for peace. Muhammad I used the ensuing peace to consolidate his realm. In addition, his forces participated in some Castilian campaigns against other Muslim territories, including the conquest of Seville (1248) and Jerez (1261). However, Muhammad's position was far from unambiguously pro-Castile. Historian L. P. Harvey speculated that after the Castilian conquest of the Muslim kingdom of Niebla in 1262, he became emboldened as the sole independent Muslim ruler in Spain, and sought to weaken Castilian control over their recently conquered territories.

== Course of the war ==
=== Beginning of rebellion ===
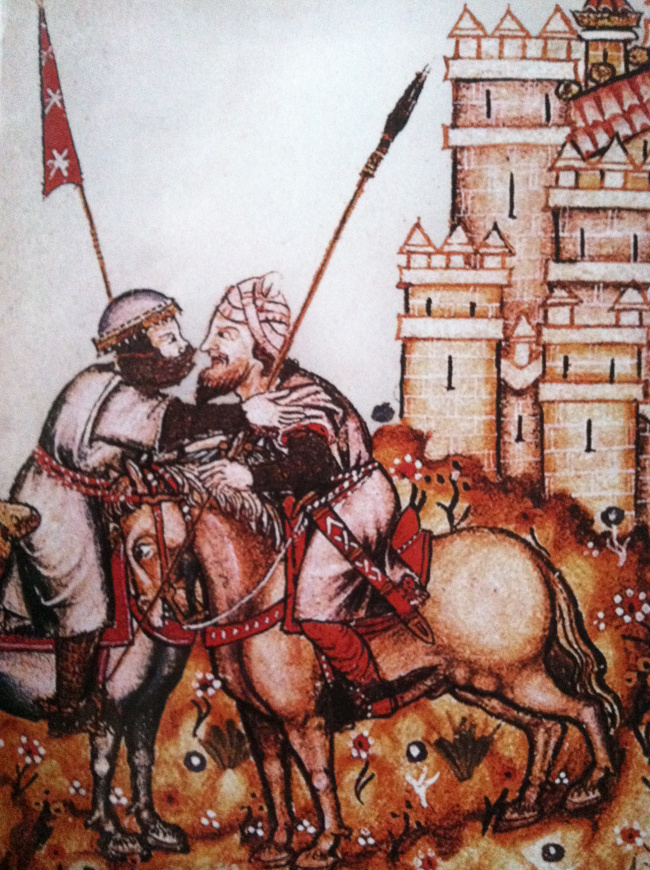
A Moorish warrior embraces his Castilian ally during the revolt, taken from The Cantigas de Santa María.

The revolt began almost simultaneously in Lower Andalusia and Murcia. The rebellion likely started between April and June 1264, when Muhammad I's name was struck from the list of Alfonso X's loyal vassals. A skirmish took place on 10 July, in which Granada defeated Castilian forces. In August 1264, the Muslim inhabitants of Jerez, aided by allies from Algeciras and Tarifa, attacked the outnumbered royal garrison led by Nuño González de Lara. The demoralized Nuño deserted his post and the alcázar was taken on 8 August. According to songs in the Cantigas de Santa Maria, the Mudéjars captured all the soldiers, destroyed the chapel of Mary and tried to burn a statue of Mary, but the statue miraculously resisted the flames. Reinforcements from Seville arrived two days later but it was too late.

Following Jerez, the Lower Andalusian towns of Lebrija, Arcos, and Medina-Sidonia also fell to the rebels. The nearby Castle of Matrera, held by the Knights of Calatrava, was successfully defended by the garrison. In Murcia, the city of Murcia itself fell, as well as Galera, but Orihuela was successfully defended by the royal forces. Murcia's Muslims ousted the city's royal garrison, and declared allegiance to Muhammad I, who appointed Abu Muhammad ibn Ashqilula to be governor. Alfonso's father-in-law, James I of Aragon, wrote that "three hundred cities, great towns and castles" were captured by the rebels and that Alfonso and Queen Violant escaped an assassination attempt in the capital, Seville. However, Alfonso did not mention any assassination attempt, and James' account might have been an exaggeration.

The Emirate of Granada, whose forces would later be bolstered by volunteers from North Africa, fully supported the rebellion. Additional Muslim troops from North Africa attempted a landing in the Guadalquivir estuary but were repulsed by Alfonso. Ultimately, North African troops did not play a significant role in the war. Muslims from Old and New Castile, such as those from Ávila, Burgos, Arévalo and Madrid, which had been under Castilian rule for generations and did not suffer from Alfonso's relocation policy, largely did not join the rebellion.

=== Castile's counter-attack ===
Castilian forces counter-attacked by marching on Jerez, a key garrison town, recapturing it in late 1264 (possibly on 9 October), after a siege. (Note: O'Callaghan 1993, pp. 187–188 rejected that Jerez and the lower Andalusian towns were recaptured in 1264 and suggested that Alfonso X took Jerez between 4–9 October 1266, followed by other towns. However, O'Callaghan's later work O'Callaghan 2011, p. 38 as well as other sources like Doubleday 2015, p. 121 use the 1264 date.) The rebel-held towns of Vejer, Medina-Sidonia, Rota, and Sanlúcar de Barrameda also fell to the royal forces. Muslims in the retaken towns were expelled, the mosques in Jerez were converted to churches, and the region was settled by Christians from elsewhere. Meanwhile, Queen Violant requested help from her father, King James I of Aragon, who was initially reluctant to provide support but eventually agreed.

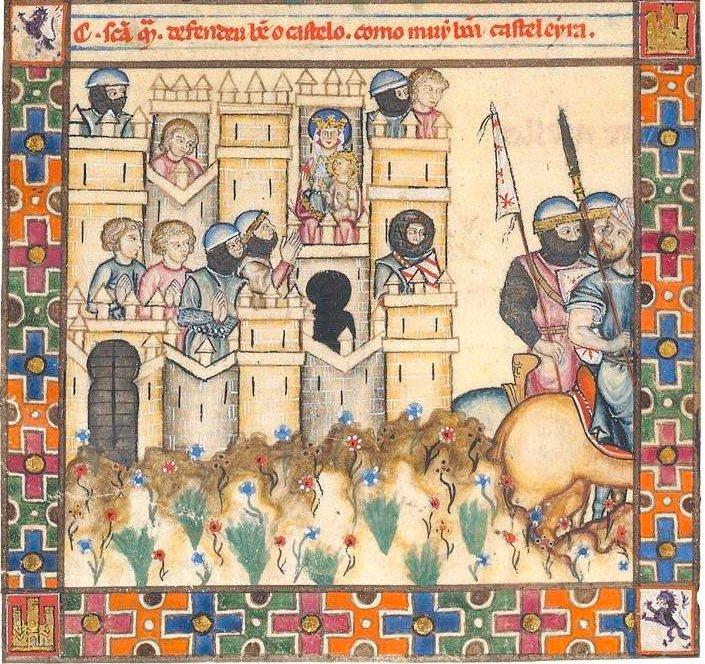
The siege of Chincoya castle during the rebellion. According to the Cantigas de Santa Maria, the Granadan troops besieging the castle retreated after the defenders put a statue of the Virgin Mary on the ramparts (illustrated).

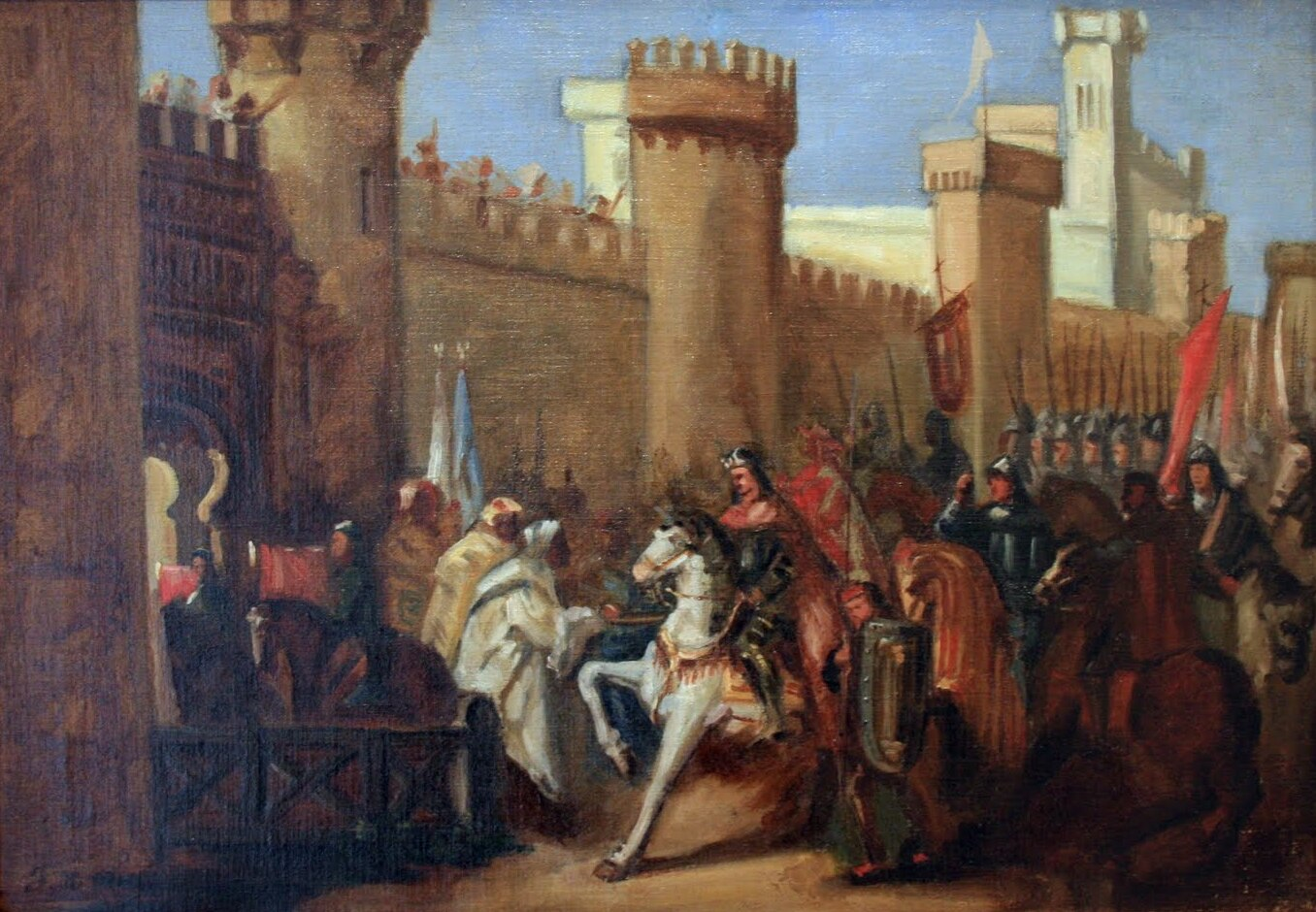
James I of Aragon entering Murcia after the surrender of the rebels, February 1266

Even though Jerez and other towns fell, Granadan forces were still actively attacking Castilian positions. The Cantigas mention an unsuccessful Granadan siege of the Chincoya castle, purportedly after a statue of the Virgin Mary put on the ramparts discouraged the Granadans from attacking. Despite the failure in Chincoya, Muhammad I likely took many poorly defended castles along the border. In response to the Granadan threat, towns in Upper Andalusia established a brotherhood pact at Andújar on 26 April 1265, swearing cooperation and a common defense.

Meanwhile, Alfonso began preparations for invading Granada. He opened communication with the Banu Ashqilula, a powerful family within the emirate at odds with the ruling Nasrid dynasty. In early 1265 a major battle took place between Alfonso and Muhammad and ended in an important victory for Castile. Alfonso subsequently invaded Granada in late spring 1265 and by summer was encamped on the plains of Granada. His forces raided Granada's territory, including Alcalá de Benzaide, forty miles (64 km) from the emirate's capital.

=== Aragonese conquest of Murcia ===
Even though James I agreed to help Castile, initially he was delayed by negotiations with his nobles. The Catalan Courts agreed to raised taxes for the campaign in July 1264, but the parliament for his other dominion, Aragonese Corts initially rejected the campaign when they met in November. James I spent the following months convincing the Aragonese lords before they consented to support his campaign. In May 1265, the Archbishop of Tarragon and the Bishop of Valencia began preaching for crusades. In late summer, Infante Peter raided the rebel-controlled countryside. In October, James himself led the Aragonese forces to invade rebel-held Murcia.

As James' army advanced to Murcia, Muslim-held towns in the region—including Villena, Elda, Petrer, Orihuela—surrendered to his forces. Granada sent a column numbering 2,800 men to relieve Murcia, but it was defeated by Aragonese troops. On 2 January 1266, James laid siege to the city. After skirmishes and negotiations, Murcia surrendered on 31 January. James entered the city on 3 February 1266, and its mosque was reconsecrated as a church (later Murcia Cathedral), where James' priests held mass. With Murcia secured, James returned to his realm in March and no longer participated in the war.

=== End of the war ===
Still in 1266, the Banu Ashqilula rebelled against Muhammad I from their stronghold at Málaga. They offered alliance to Alfonso X, who responded by promising to personally protect them and sent a force of 1,000 men under the command of Nuño González de Lara to defend Málaga. In exchange, the Banu Ashqilula might have promised to cede Antequera, Archidona and Marbella to Castile. There is a lack of record about battles or military operations from this point onward, but it seemed that the Castile-Banu Ashqilula alliance was gaining advantage.

With his allies defeated and facing enemies in two fronts, Muhammad I sued for peace. He and his son (the future Muhammad II) concluded a treaty at Alcalá de Benzaide, with Muhammad agreeing to become Alfonso's vassal and pay a tribute of 250,000 maravedís per year. Sources vary on the date of this treaty. Alfonso X's Royal Chronicle dated it at 1265, but modern historian Joseph F. O'Callaghan dismissed this date as "confused". Moroccan historian Ibn Idhari's Al-Bayan al-Mughrib (written 1312) dated the treaty at 665 AH, which corresponds to a range between October 1266 and September 1267. O'Callaghan dated it at 1267, possibly late May or early June, while another historian, Simon R. Doubleday, dated it at late August or early September 1266.

== Aftermath ==
The failure of the rebellion had disastrous consequences for Muslims in Andalusia and Murcia. Castile annexed Murcia—which had been semi-independent since 1244—outright, except for Orihuela and Elche which were annexed by Aragon. The victors imposed harsh punishments in the rebellious territories, including mass expulsion and ethnic cleansing. Alfonso paid Christians from elsewhere to settle the formerly Muslim lands, and mosques were reconsecrated as churches. From this point on Muslims were almost non-existent in Andalusia. In Murcia, the large Muslim population remained with their religious rights guaranteed, but they were forced to move to the suburb of Arrixaca, and their houses and lands in the city were divided among Christian settlers. Over time, Alfonso reduced the portion of lands allocated to the Muslims.

In Granada, the rebellion had mixed consequences. Granada had suffered a heavy defeat and had to pay an enormous tribute to Castile, significantly greater than what it paid before the rebellion. However, the signing of the treaty ensured its survival and Granada emerged as the sole independent Muslim state in the peninsula. Muslims who were expelled by Castile emigrated to Granada, strengthening the Emirate's population.

For Castile, the revolt, which had nearly succeeded, had been a grave threat to Alfonso's rule and had shaken his self-confidence. In the years after the rebellion, he accomplished little and, subsequently, rebellion began to foment among his nobles, including those who had taken refuge in Granada. The presence of Granada on his southern borders also complicated his efforts to launch a crusade in Africa. The tribute payments from Granada became both a source of income and a major problem, because the resulting inflation reduced the effective revenue of Castilian nobles and made attracting settlers using payments more difficult. Alfonso stayed in Jerez until late 1268, overseeing the Christian settlement of the territories and attempting to stem the inflation.

The Mudéjars of Old and New Castile, most of whom did not join the rebellion, were unaffected by the expulsion imposed in the rebellious territories. However, the community became less prominent than before, accepting that discretion and second-class status were the price to be paid to ensure survival.
