= Zanata, Republic of Dagestan =

Zanata Заната
- Selo
- Location within Republic of Dagestan Location within Russia
- Coordinates: 42°29′N 46°33′E
- Country: Russia
- Region: Republic of Dagestan
- District: Shamilsky District
- Time zone: UTC+3:00

Zanata (Russian: Заната) is a rural locality (a selo) in Shamilsky District, Republic of Dagestan, Russia. Population: 275 (2021 census); 156 (2002 census); 147 (1989 Soviet census). There is 1 street in this selo.

== Geography ==
This rural locality is located 5 km from Khebda (the district's administrative centre), 94 km from Makhachkala (capital of Dagestan) and 1,647 km from Moscow. Mogokh is the nearest rural locality.
