= Jerez (disambiguation) =

Jerez de la Frontera is a city in Andalusia, Spain.

Jerez also may refer to:

== Geography ==
- Jaén, Peru, formerly known as "Jerez de la Frontera"
- Jerez de García Salinas, Mexico
- Jerez (river), Serbia

=== Spain ===
- Jerez de los Caballeros, Extremadura
- Jérez del Marquesado, Granada
- Taifa of Jerez, a small independent emirate created c. 1145

== Other uses ==
- Sherry (Spanish: Jerez), a fortified wine
- Circuito de Jerez, a racetrack near Jerez de la Frontera

== See also ==
- Jerez Airport
- Banda Jerez, a Mexican band
- Siege of Jerez (disambiguation)
