= La Aparecida =

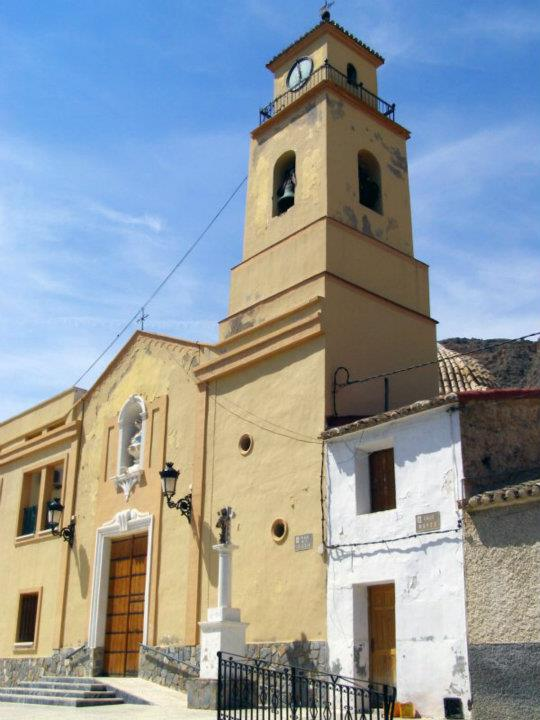

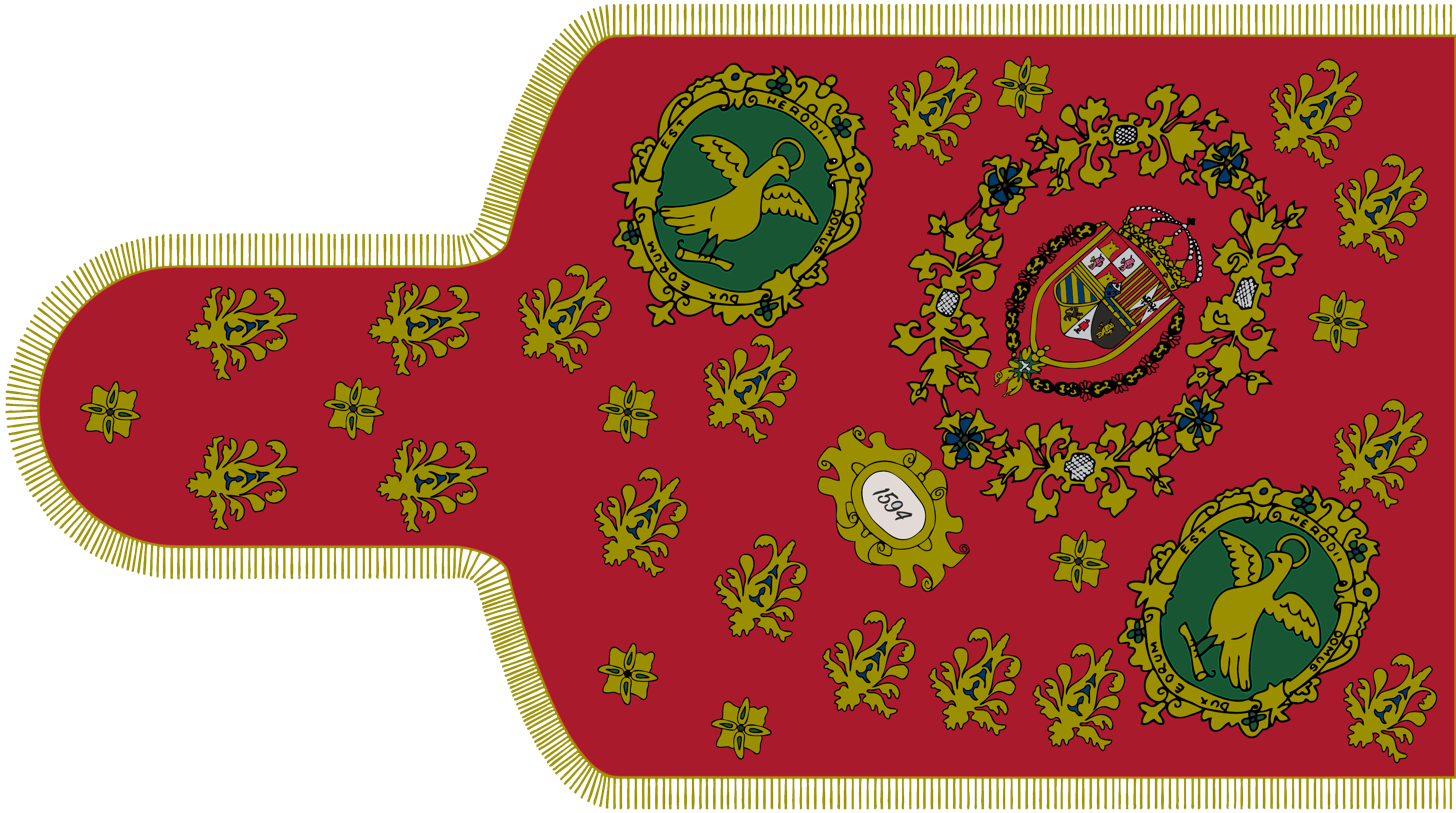
- Flag Coat of arms

- Location in Spain
- Coordinates: 38.081°N 1.009°W
- Country: Spain
- Province: Alicante
- Municipality: Orihuela
- Elevation: 31 m (102 ft)

La Aparecida is a village in Alicante, Spain. It is part of the municipality of Orihuela.
