= Barbarroja (Alicante) =

- Village
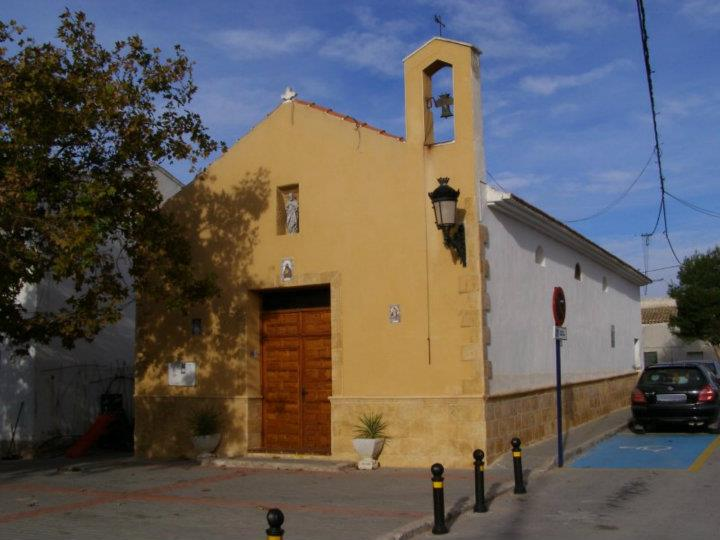

- Location within Province of Alicante Location within Valencian Community Location within Spain
- Coordinates: 38°16′38″N 0°57′46″W
- Country: Spain
- Autonomous community: Valencian Community
- Province: Province of Alicante
- Municipality: Orihuela
- Elevation: 404 m (1,325 ft)

Population
  - Total: 93

Barbarroja is a village located in the municipality of Orihuela, in Alicante province, Valencian Community, Spain. As of 2020, it has a population of 93.

== Geography ==
Barbarroja is located 63km west-southwest of Alicante.
