= Correntías Altas =

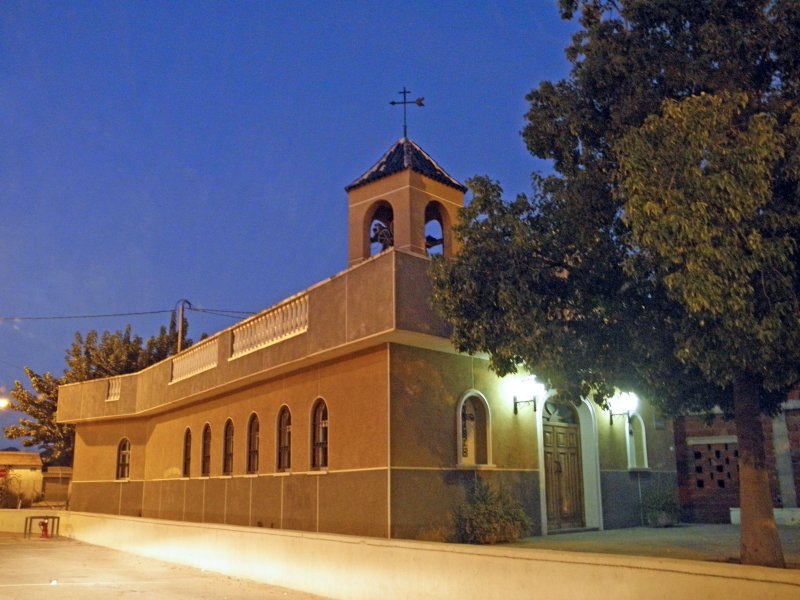
- Interactive map of Correntías Altas
- Country: Spain
- Province: Alicante
- Municipality: Orihuela
- Elevation: 20 m (66 ft)

Correntías Altas is a village in Alicante, Spain. It is part of the municipality of Orihuela.
