= Correntías Bajas =

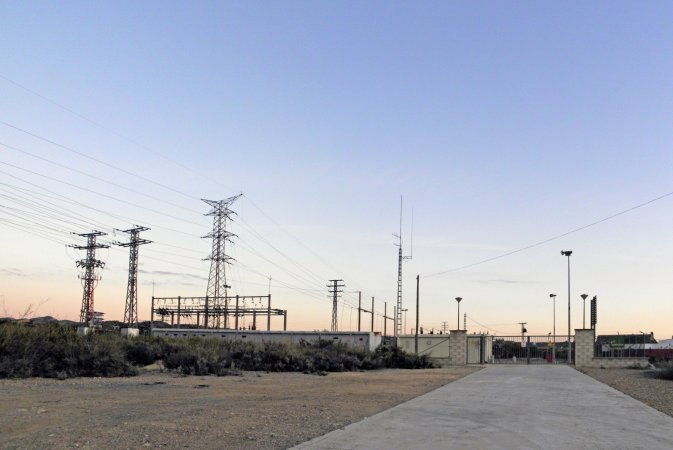

- Location in Spain
- Coordinates: 38.067°N 0.853°W
- Country: Spain
- Province: Alicante
- Municipality: Orihuela
- Elevation: 22 m (72 ft)

Population (2015)
  - Total: 84

Correntías Bajas is a village in Alicante, Spain. It is part of the municipality of Orihuela
