= Santiago Apostol, Orihuela =

15th Century Roman Catholic church

Santiago Apostol is a 15th-century Roman Catholic church in the town of Orihuela in the Valencian Community, Spain.

Construction of the church in Valencian Gothic style began in the 15th century. The façade was added in Renaissance style, and the interiors have Baroque decoration.
