= La Campaneta =

Coordinates: 38°05′N 0°53′W

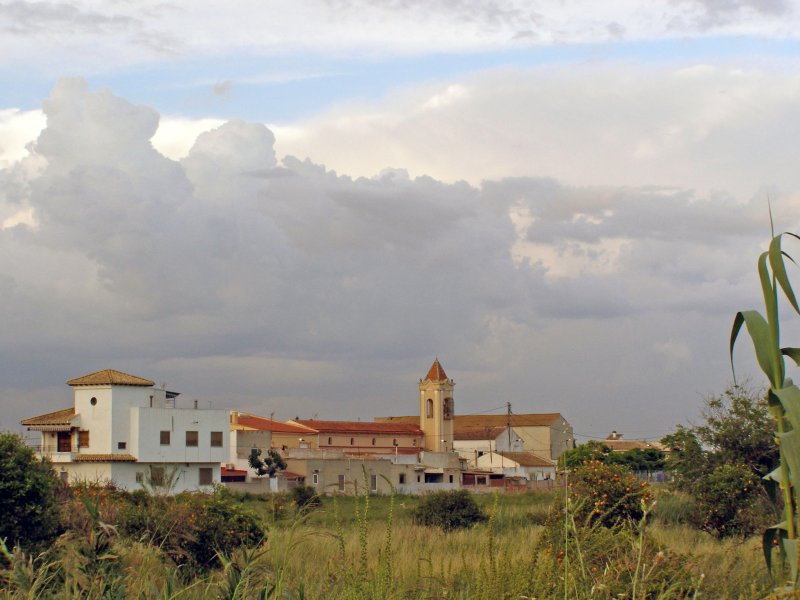
- Interactive map of La Campaneta
- Country: Spain
- Province: Alicante
- Municipality: Orihuela
- Elevation: 2 m (6.6 ft)

Population (2011)
  - Total: 1,192

La Campaneta is a village in the municipality of Orihuela, Alicante, Spain, with a population of around 1225. It has a large shoe industry, as well as various agricultural companies.
