= El Escorratel =

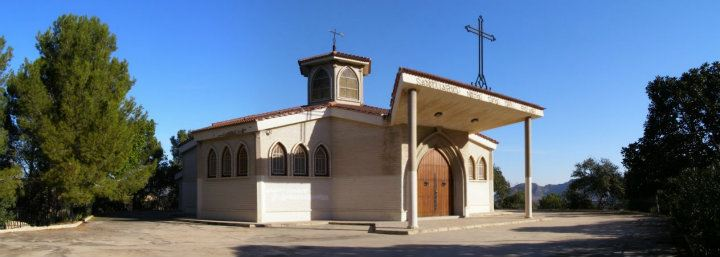

- Location in Spain
- Coordinates: 38.101°N 0.930°W
- Country: Spain
- Province: Alicante
- Municipality: Orihuela
- Elevation: 23 m (75 ft)

Population (2011)
  - Total: 906

El Escorratel is a village in Alicante, Spain. It is part of the municipality of Orihuela.
