= Arneva =

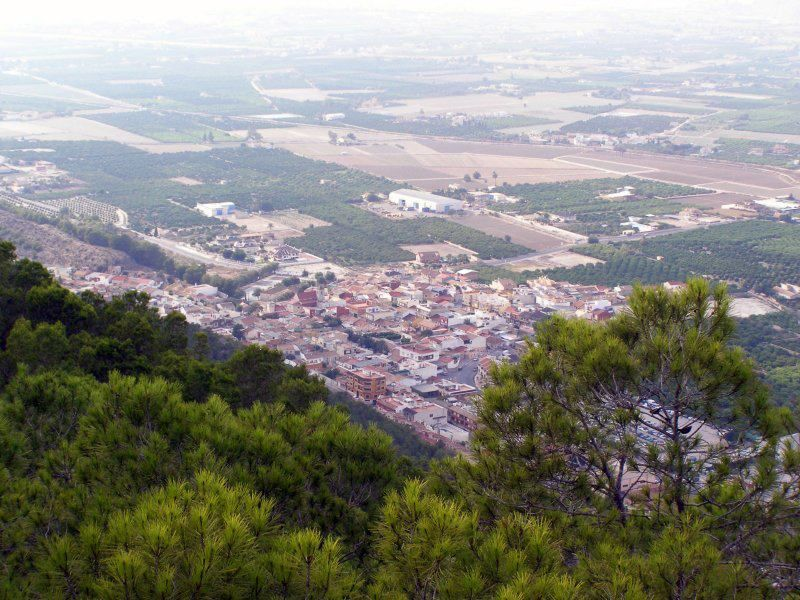
- Interactive map of Arneva
- Coordinates: 38°03′N 0°56′W
- Country: Spain
- Province: Alicante
- Municipality: Orihuela
- Elevation: 23 m (75 ft)

Population (2009)
  - Total: 1,199

Arneva is a village in Alicante, Spain. It is part of the municipality of Orihuela.
