= Correntías Medias =

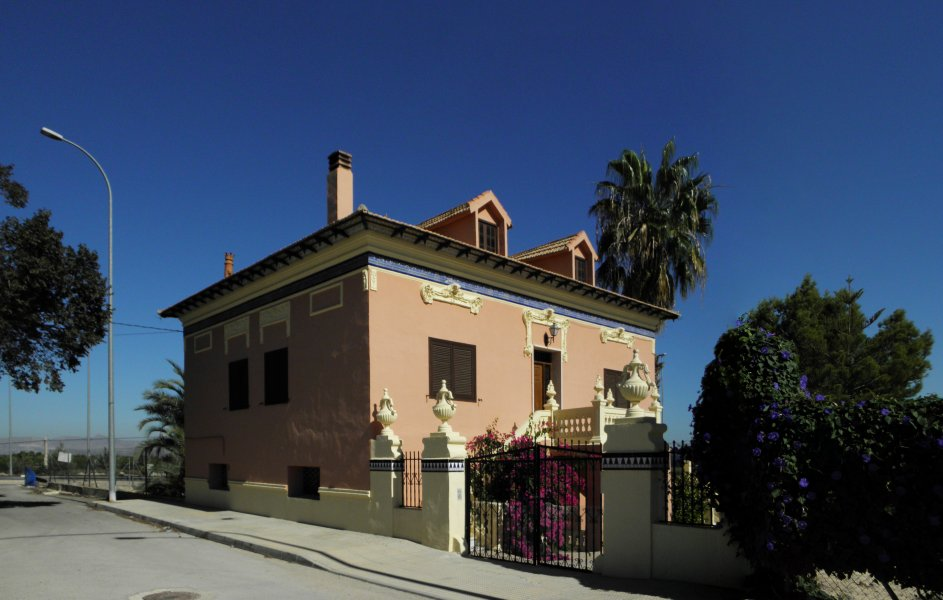

- Location in Spain
- Coordinates: 38.077°N 0.930°W
- Country: Spain
- Province: Alicante
- Municipality: Orihuela
- Elevation: 20 m (66 ft)

Population (2015)
  - Total: 1,400

Correntías Medias is a village in Alicante, Spain. It is part of the municipality of Orihuela

== Controversies ==
The village is noted for its poor quality of healthcare. The PSOE denounced the village's medical centre because of multiple issues including lack of power in the building and rain leaking through the ceiling.
