= Hurchillo =

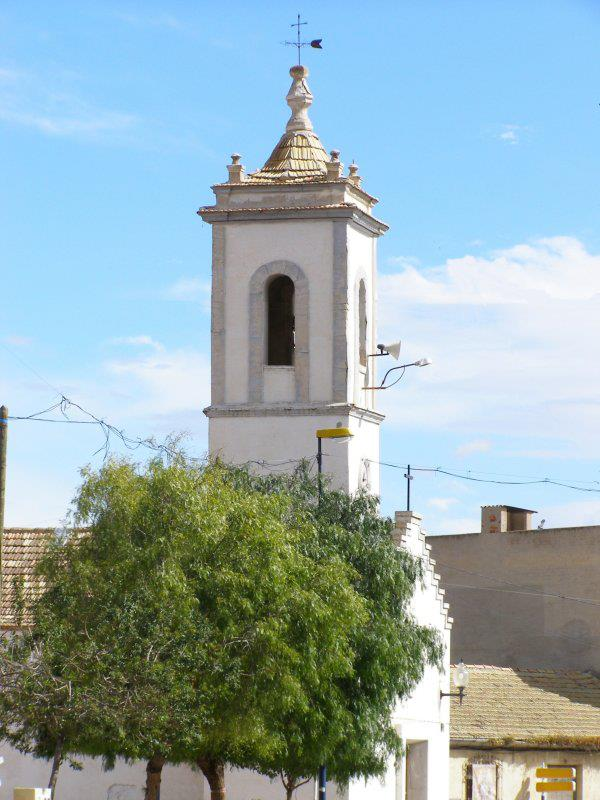
- Interactive map of Hurchillo
- Coordinates: 38.0594°N 0.9222°W
- Country: Spain
- Province: Alicante
- Municipality: Orihuela
- Elevation: 23 m (75 ft)

Population (2011)
  - Total: 1,088

Hurchillo is a village in Alicante, Spain. It is part of the municipality of Orihuela.
