= Playa Flamenca =

Locality in Spain

Coordinates: 37°55′52″N 0°43′13″W

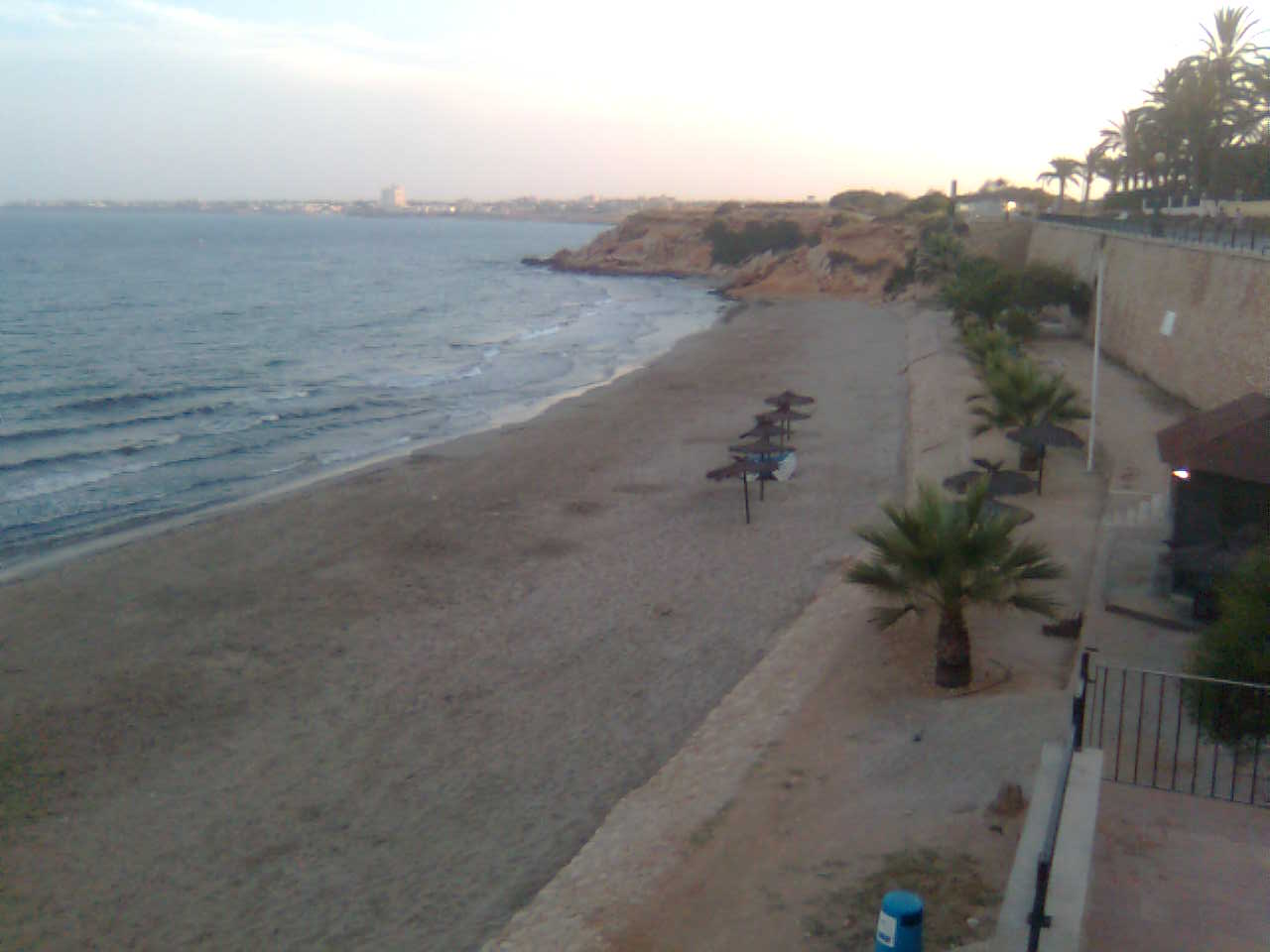
The beach from above

Playa Flamenca is a locality and beach, 4 kilometres (2.5 mi) south of the town of Torrevieja in the municipality of Orihuela in the Province of Alicante, eastern Spain. The market there sells a range of items from shoes, clothing, belts and purses to vegetables.
