= Camino de Beniel =

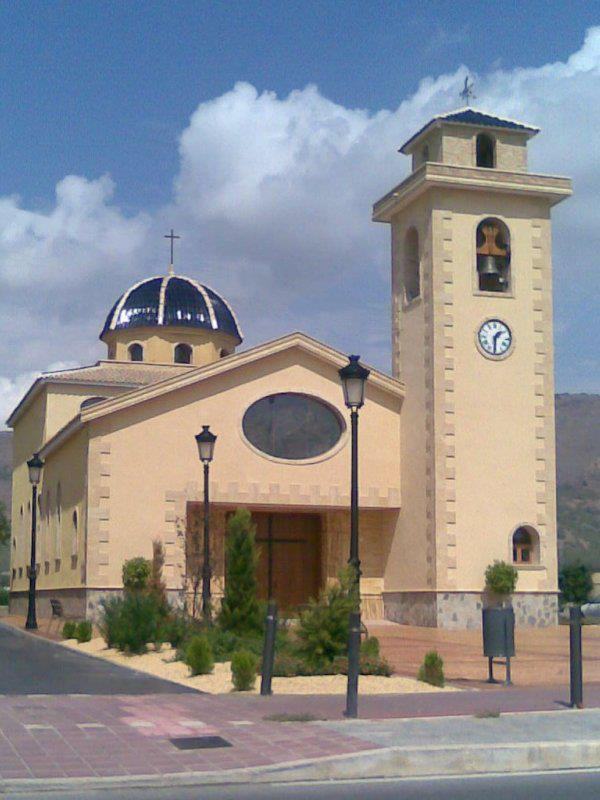

- Location in the Province of Alicante Location in the Valencian Community Location in Spain
- Coordinates: 38°4′48.53″N 0°57′30.97″W
- Country: Spain
- Autonomous community: Valencian Community
- Province: Alicante
- Municipality: Orihuela
- Elevation: 25 m (82 ft)

Population (2011)
  - Total: 817

Camino de Beniel is a village in Alicante, Spain. It is part of the municipality of Orihuela, and has 817 citizens.

== See also ==
- List of municipalities of Spain
