= El Mudamiento =

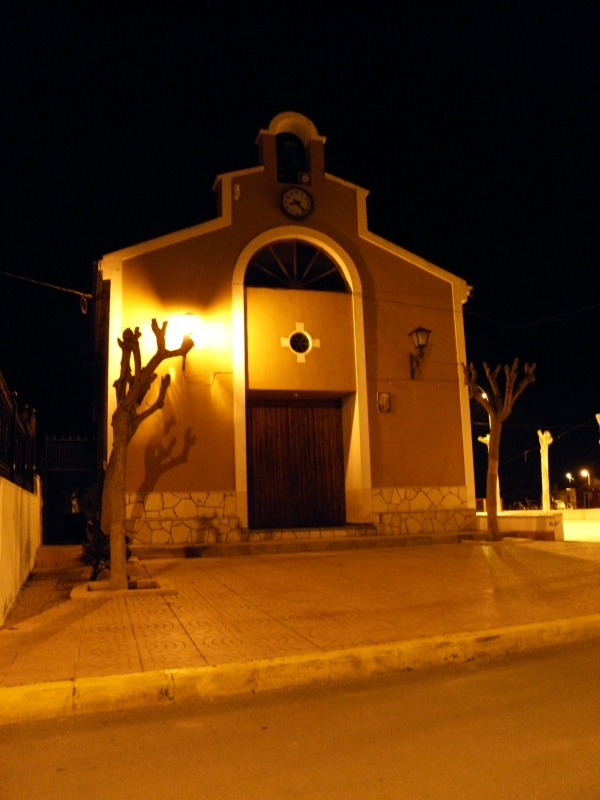
- Interactive map of El Mudamiento
- Coordinates: 38.11958°N 0.835693°W
- Country: Spain
- Province: Alicante
- Municipality: Orihuela
- Elevation: 16 m (52 ft)

Population (2011)
  - Total: 485

El Mudamiento is a village in Alicante, Spain. It is part of the municipality of Orihuela.
