= Alcázar of Jerez de la Frontera =

Islamic castle in Andalusia, Spain

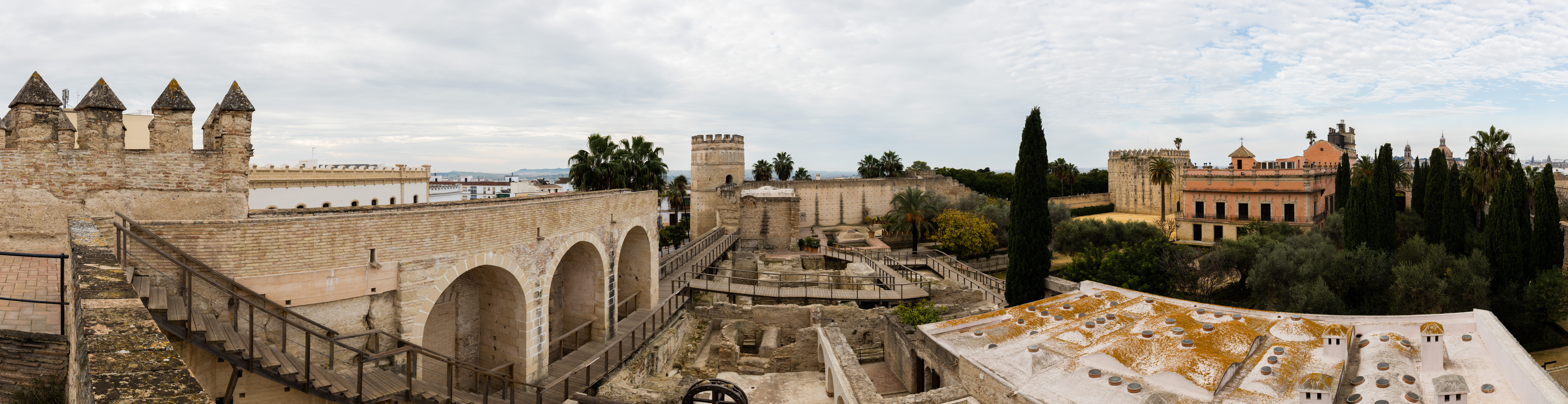

- Location within Spain
- 36°40′50″N 06°08′24″W
- Location: Jerez de la Frontera, Spain

Site notes
- Architectural styles: Almohad, Baroque

Spanish Cultural Heritage
- Official name: Alcázar de Jerez de la Frontera
- Type: Non-movable
- Criteria: Monument
- Designated: 1931
- Reference no.: RI-51-0000494

The Alcázar of Jerez de la Frontera is a former Moorish alcázar, now housing a park, in Jerez de la Frontera, in the South of Spain. It was declared a Bien de Interés Cultural in 1931.

The first fortress was probably built in the 11th century, when Jerez was part of the small kingdom of the Taifa of Arcos de la Frontera, on a site settled since prehistoric times in the south-eastern corner of the city. In the 12th century, a new structure was erected to be used as both residence and fortress by the Almohad Caliphate. Later, after the Reconquista, it was the seat of the first Christian mayors and its development continued with a palace and other structures. The alcázar is one of a few structures that best exemplify Almohad architecture in the Iberian Peninsula.

== Description ==
The alcázar is made up of a grossly quadrangular line of walls, with a perimeter of approximately 4,000 meters (13,000 ft). The Octagonal Tower was constructed in the Almohad style, while the Palace of Villavicencio, which built in 1664, was done in Baroque style.

Within the alcázar is a mosque, the only remaining of the 18 once present in the city. After the Christian conquest of the fortress in 1261, it was put under the command of Nuño González de Lara. Later, it was turned into a church dedicated to the Virgin Mary by King Alfonso X of Castile. The minaret, still extant, was turned into a bell tower. The prayer hall, preceded by a small room of ritual ablutions, features a mihrab, indicating the direction of Mecca, and a rib vault with a circular window at the top.

- the Palace of the Patio de Doña Blanca, dating to the 12th-century Islamic structure, originally a leisure pavilion
- the bathhouse (hammam), they include an entrance area for undressing, leading to the cold and warm rooms, the latter being the largest in the complex. The final room is the hot room, whose heating system is still partially visible.

=== The Alcázar Complex ===
The defenses of the complex consisted of a double-walled design wherein a 4-meter-high battlement-topped outer wall was located 4 meters from the inner wall. That inner wall featured towers located at regular intervals; of the original towers, only 7 remain. These were mostly built using rammed earth and brick, though there are portions that utilize stone spolia from nearby sites. The towers themselves are Albarrana Towers and attached to the wall through a short arcade rather than being built into the wall.

The castle-fortress itself served as an autonomous fortified city situated within a larger fortified city. This arrangement was a commonplace feature of Almohad building practices. As such, all the essentials of both military defense and everyday civilian life were contained within its walls. These included not only living quarters, baths, and mosques but also supply warehouses and water tanks. The building of a complex of such scale was both due to the Almohad aptitude for refining the construction process to a degree comparable with that of the Romans, and to their diminished use of decorative elements as compared to previous eras.

== Gallery ==
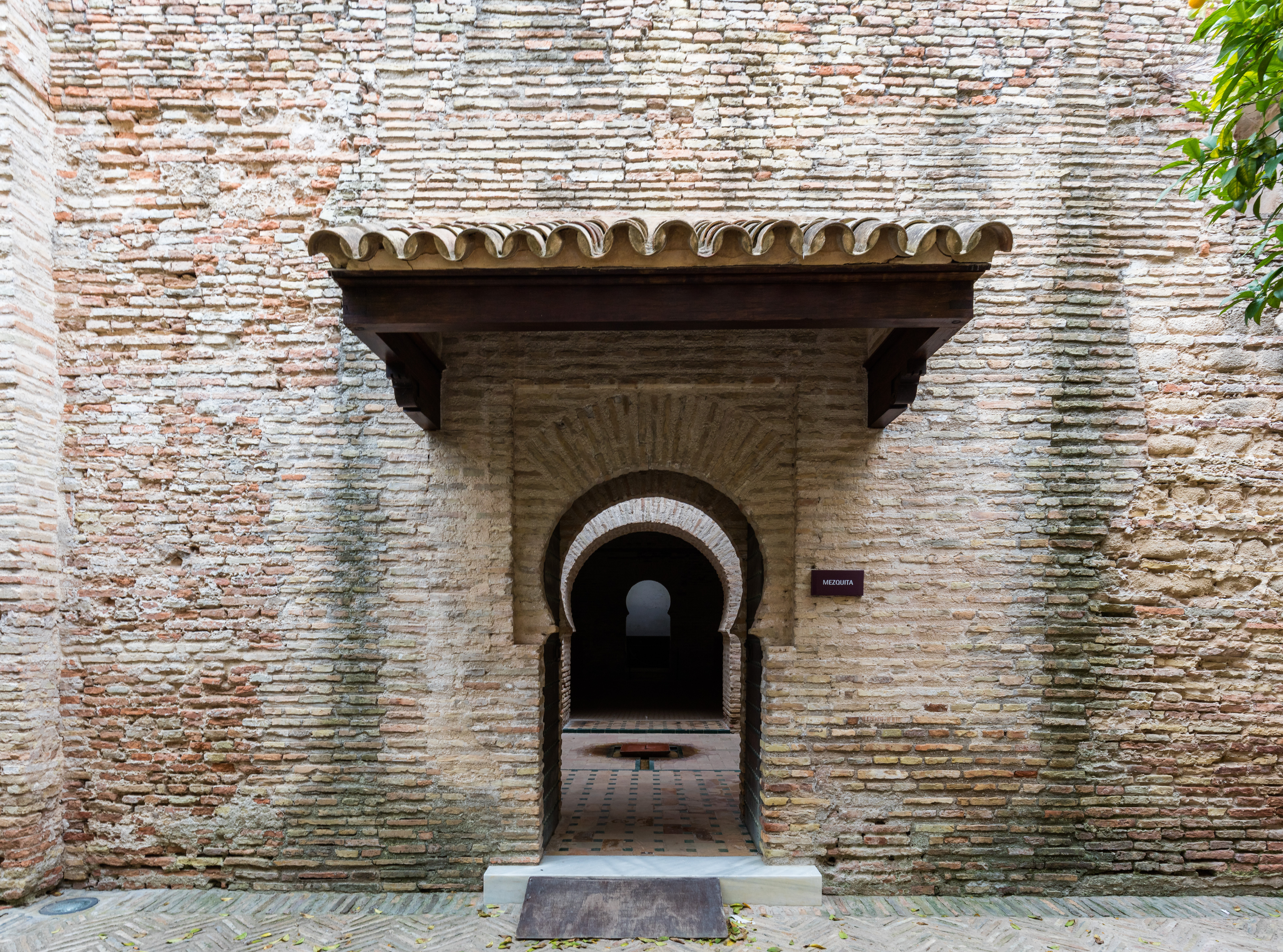
Mosque entrance

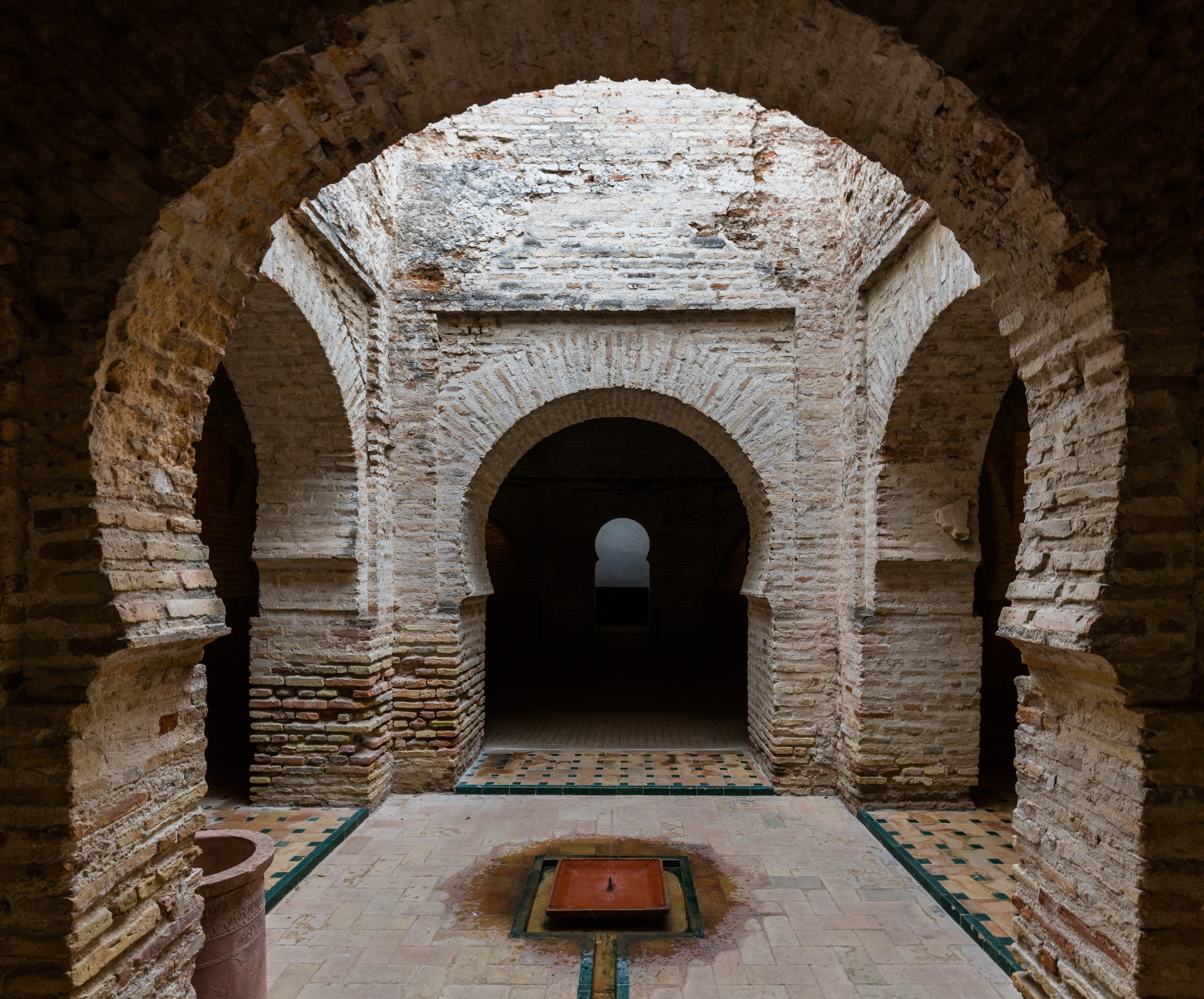
Interior view of mosque

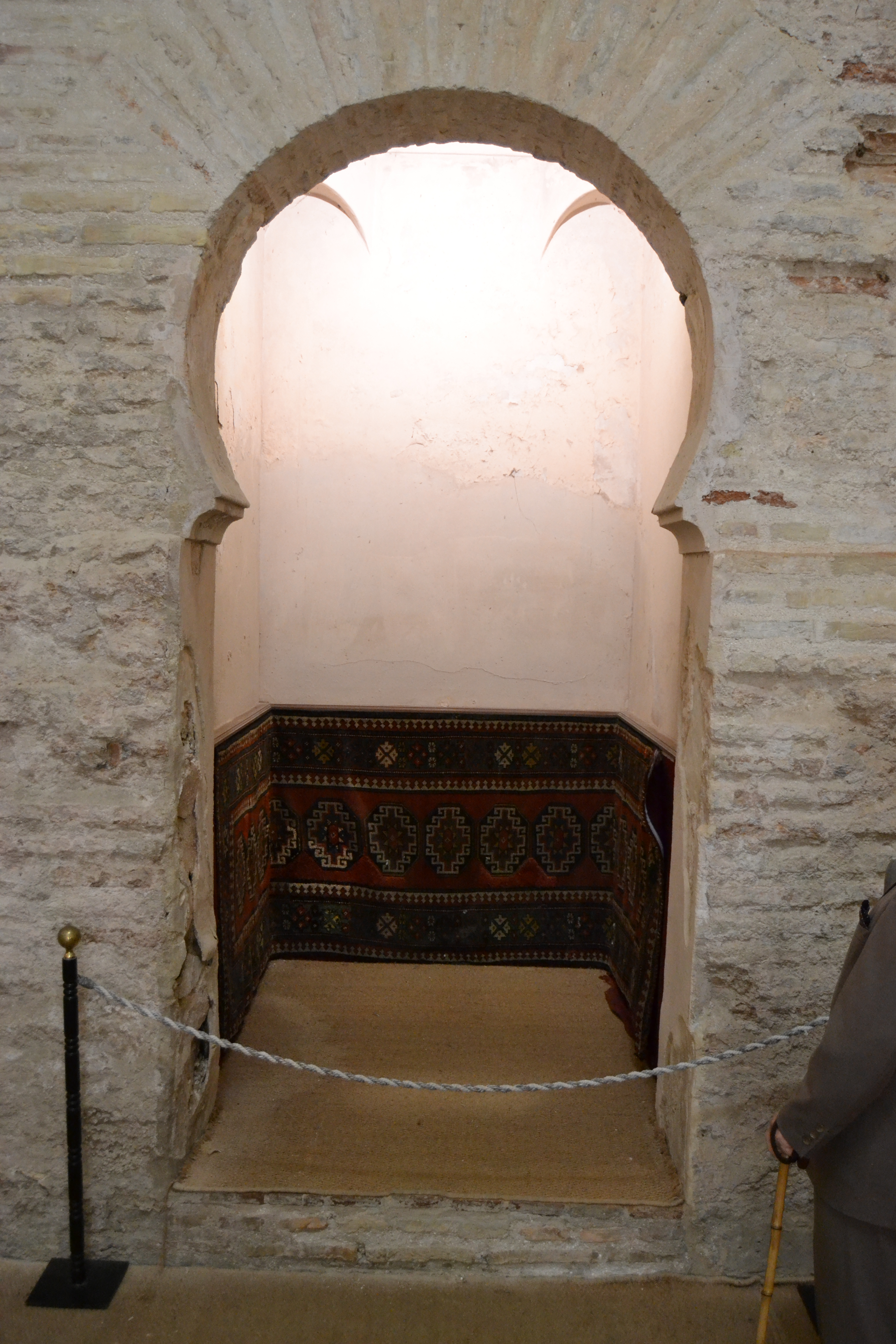
Mihrab detail

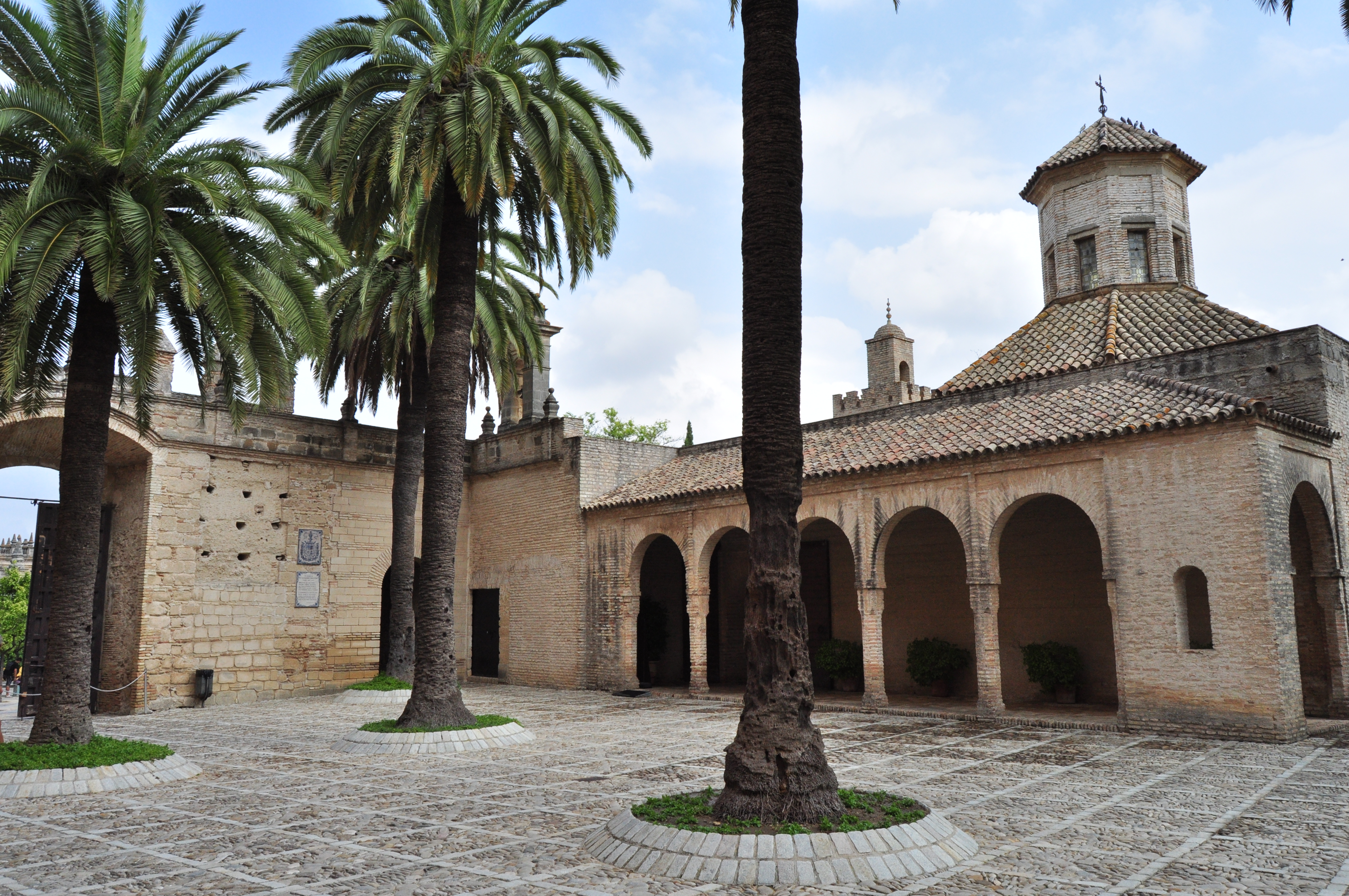
Courtyard outside mosque

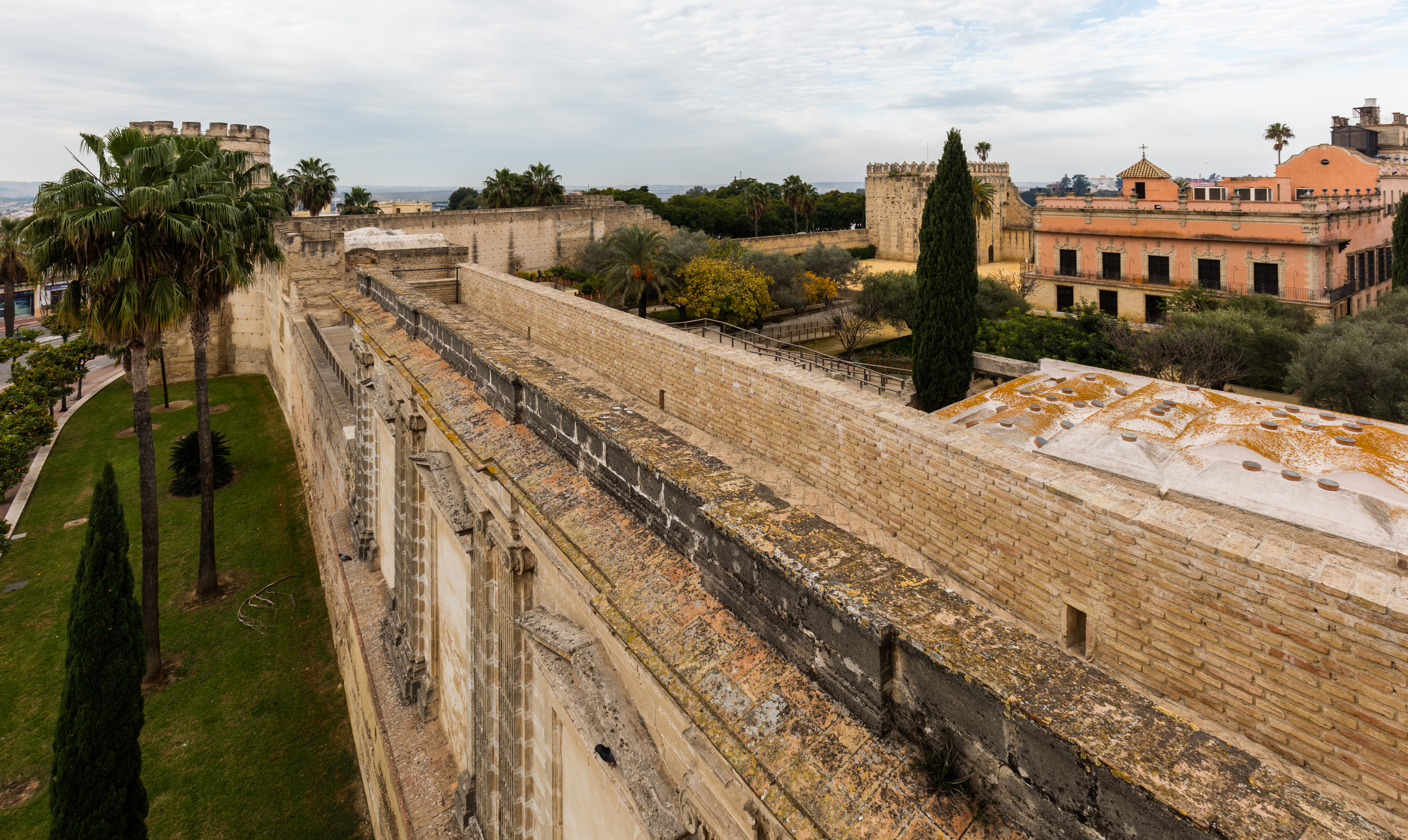
Superior view of the wall

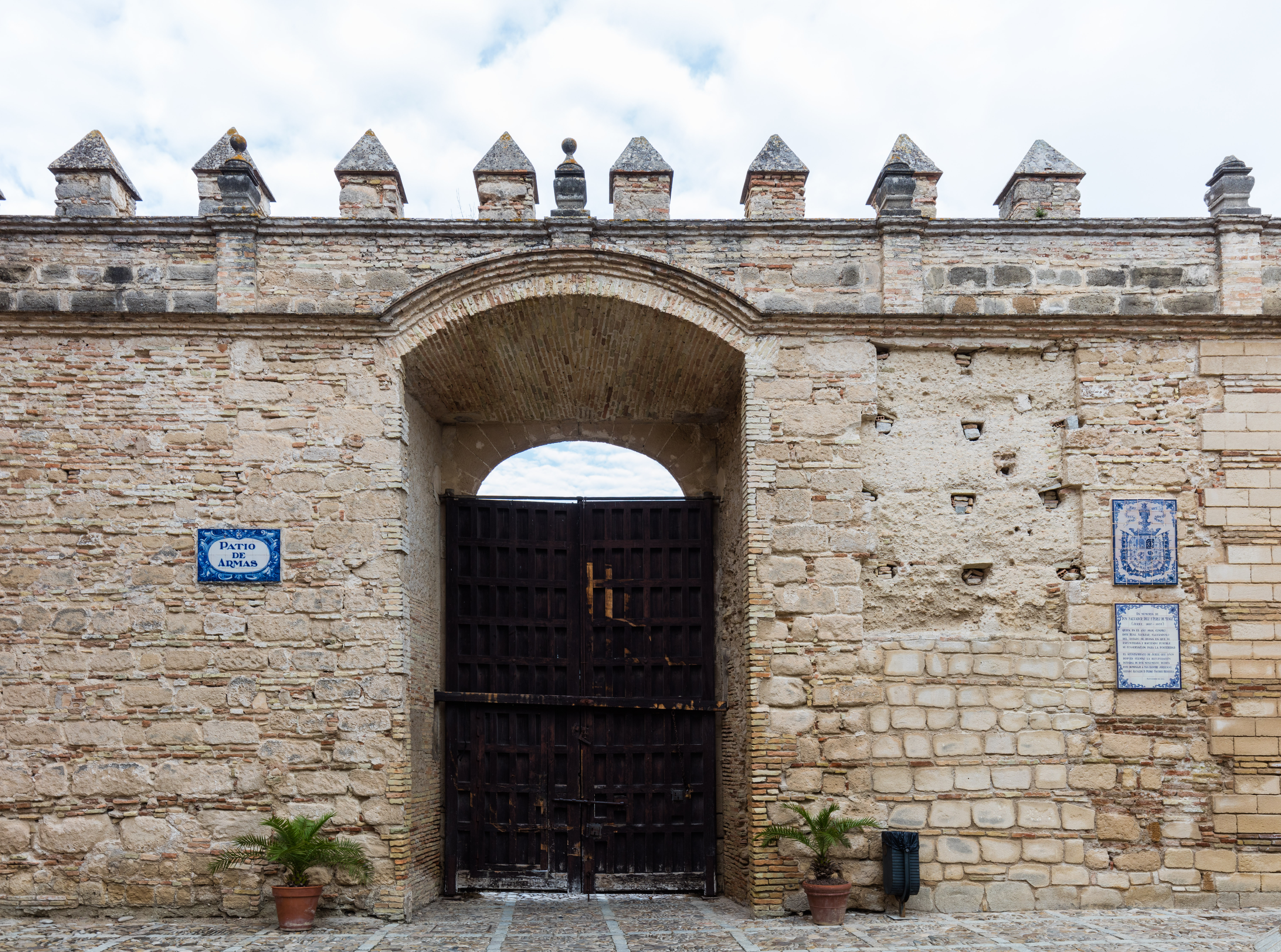
Interior view of the wall

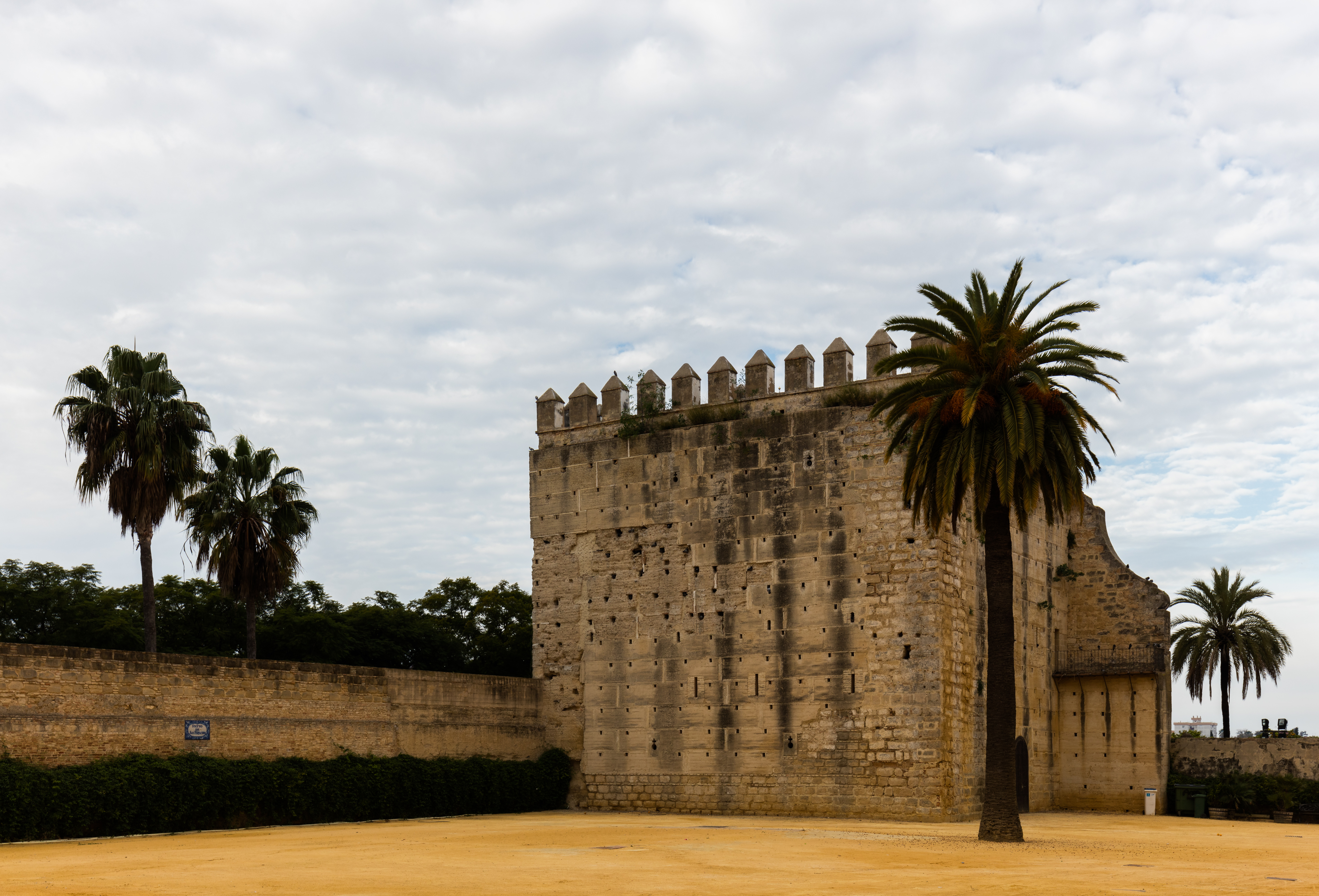
Watchtower

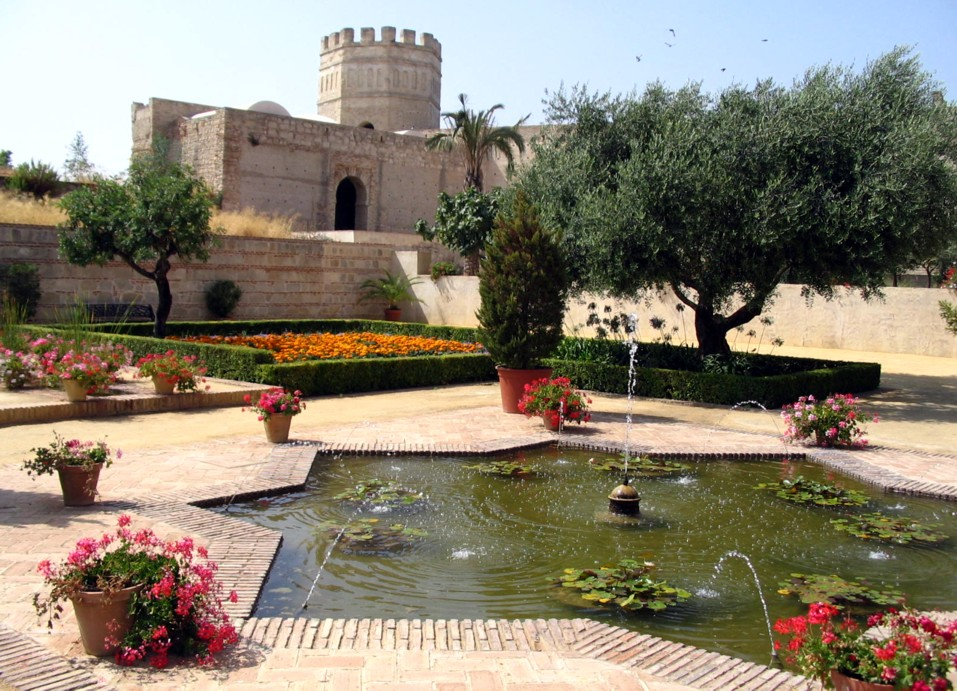
Gardens and Octagonal Tower

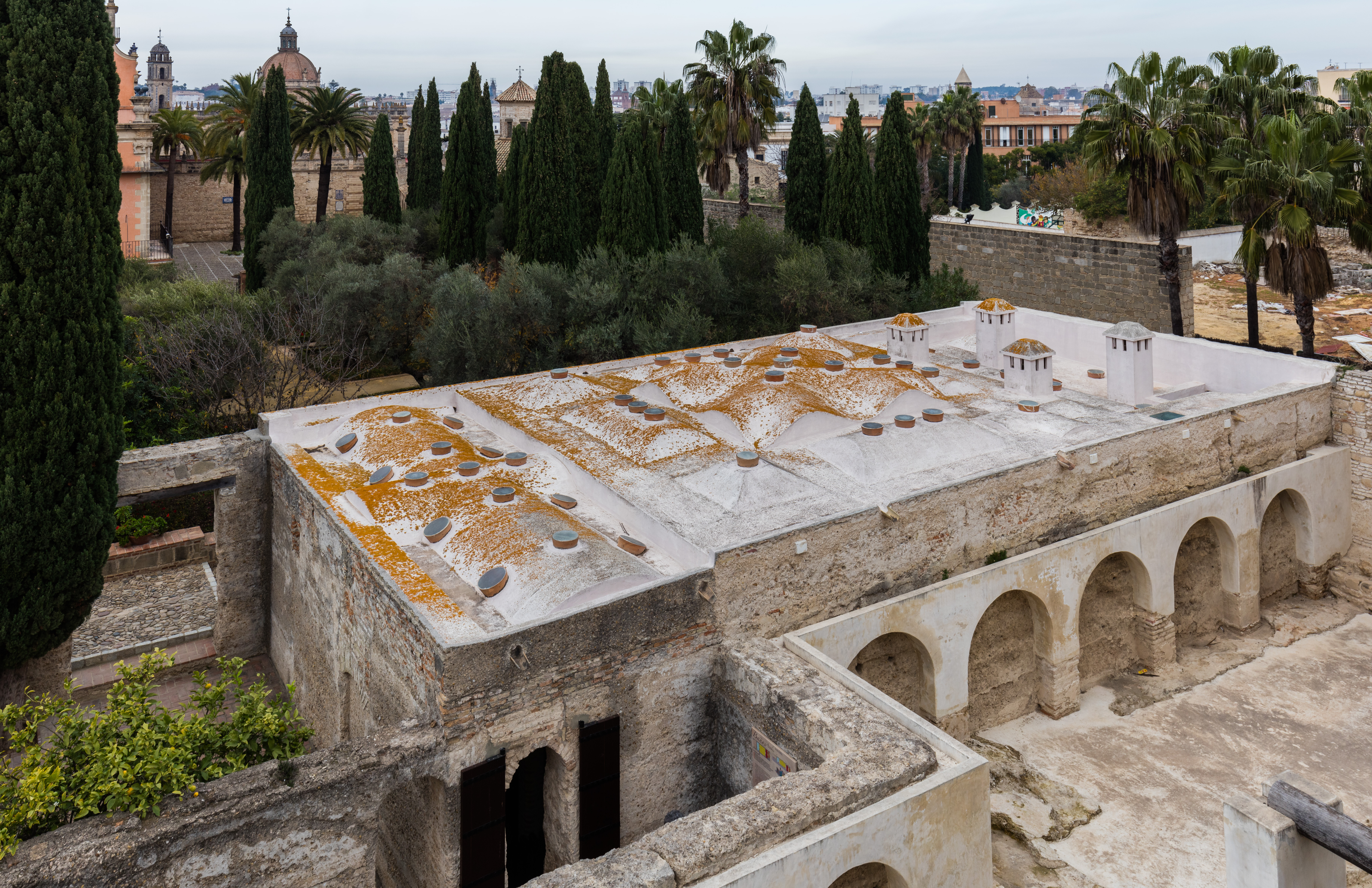
Exterior view of the baths

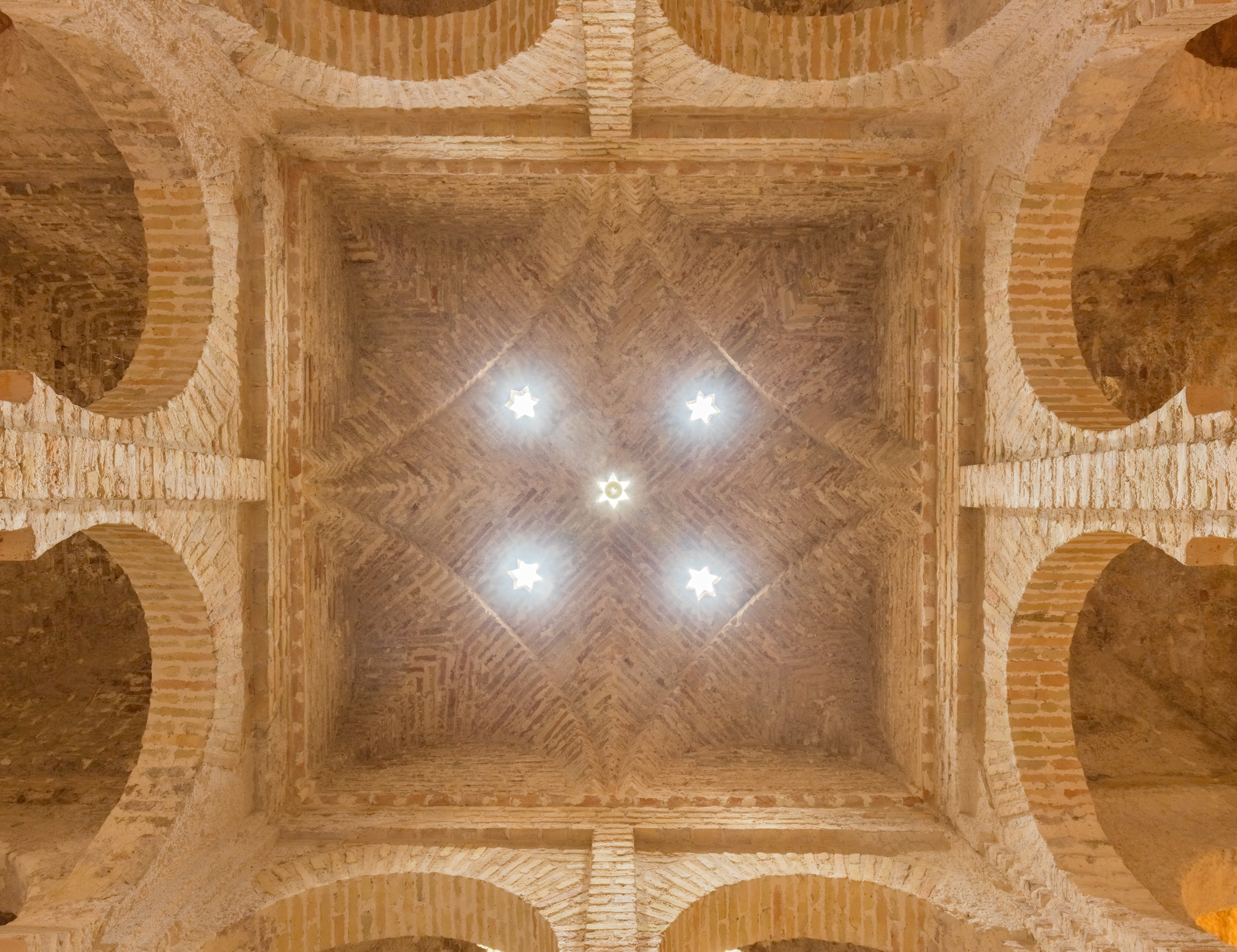
Interior of the baths, vaulting detail

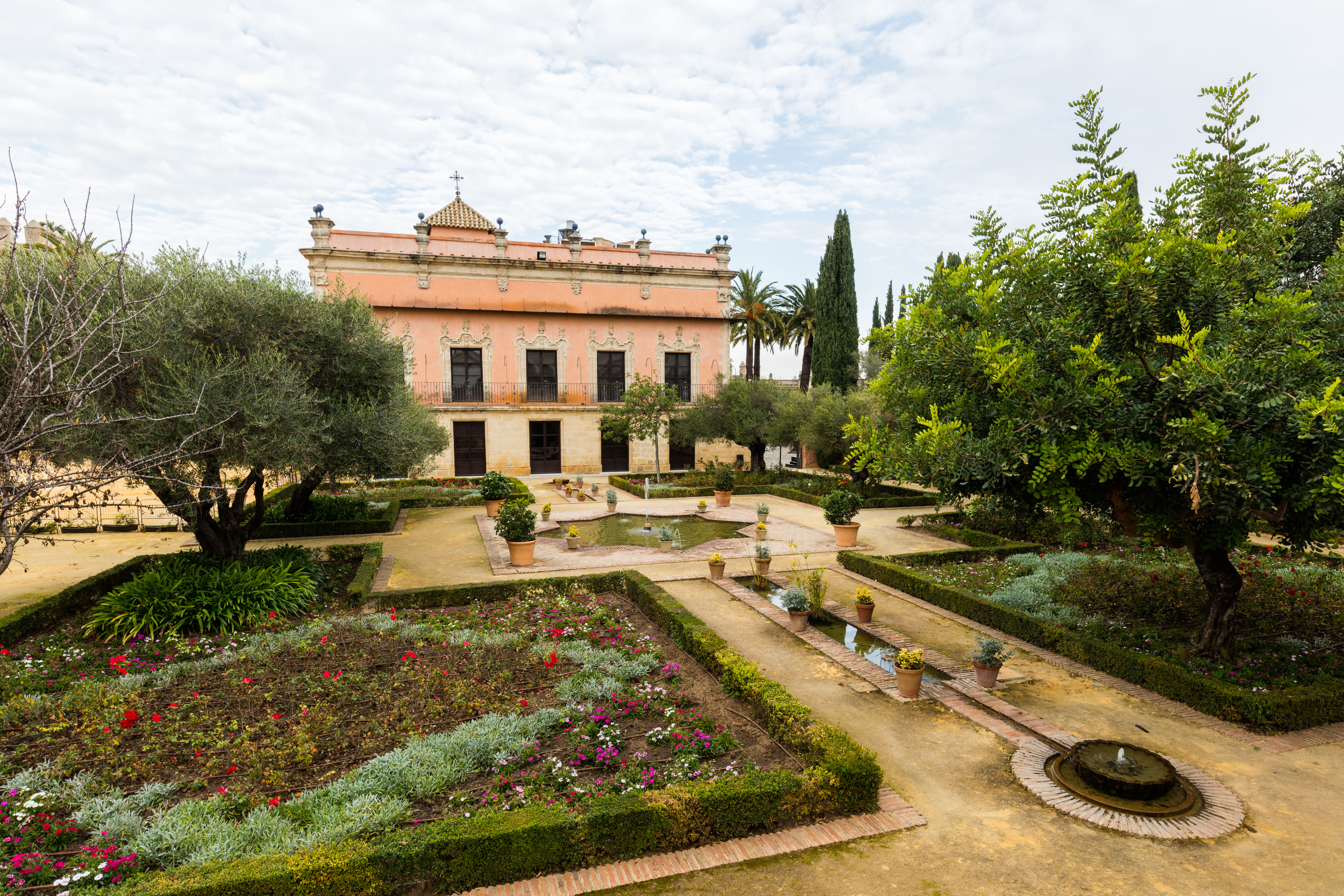
Palacio de Villavicencio

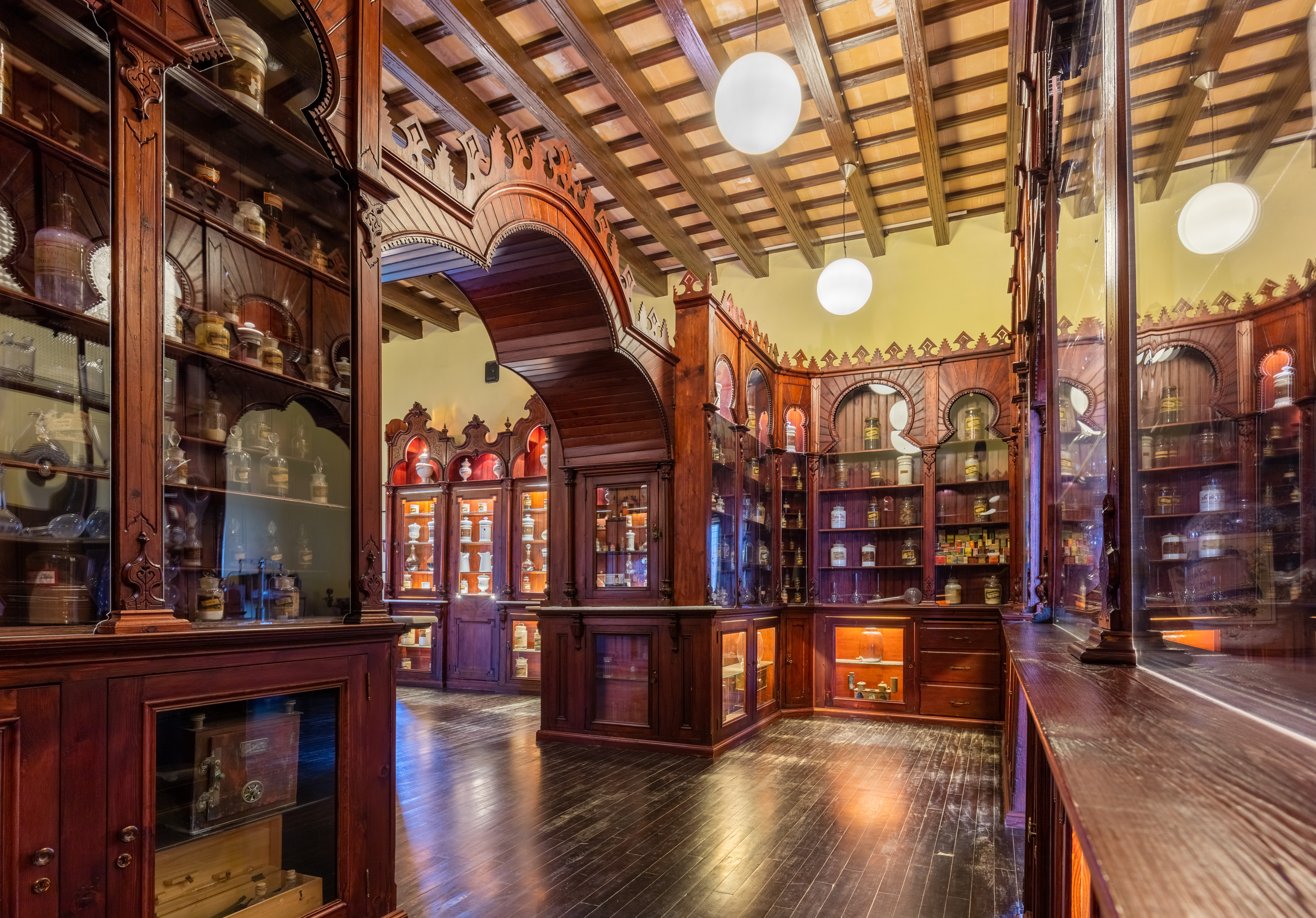
Former municipal pharmacy, Palace of Villavicencio

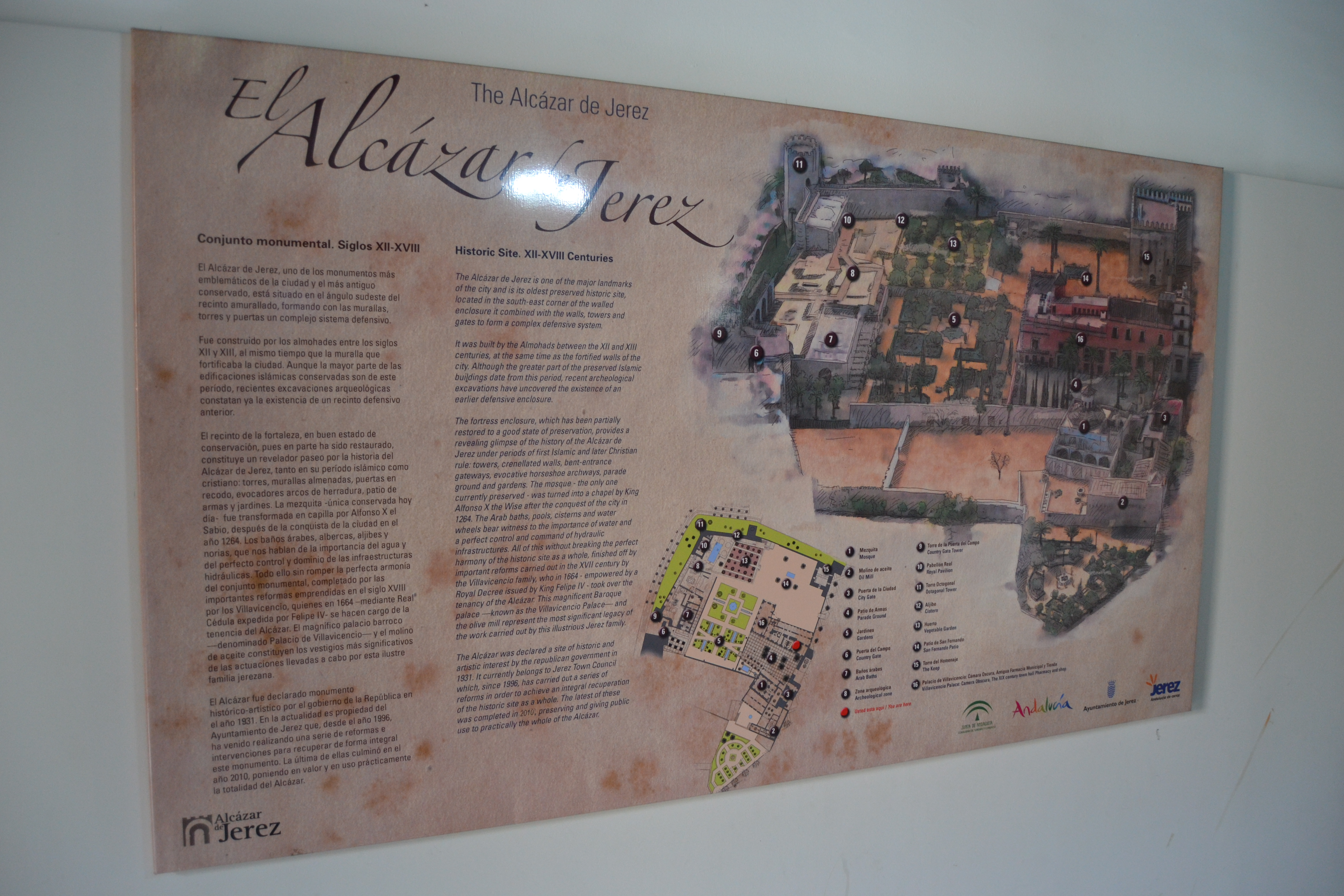
Informational plaque

== See also ==
- List of Bienes de Interés Cultural in the Province of Cádiz
