= Orihuela =

Orihuela Oriola
- City and municipality
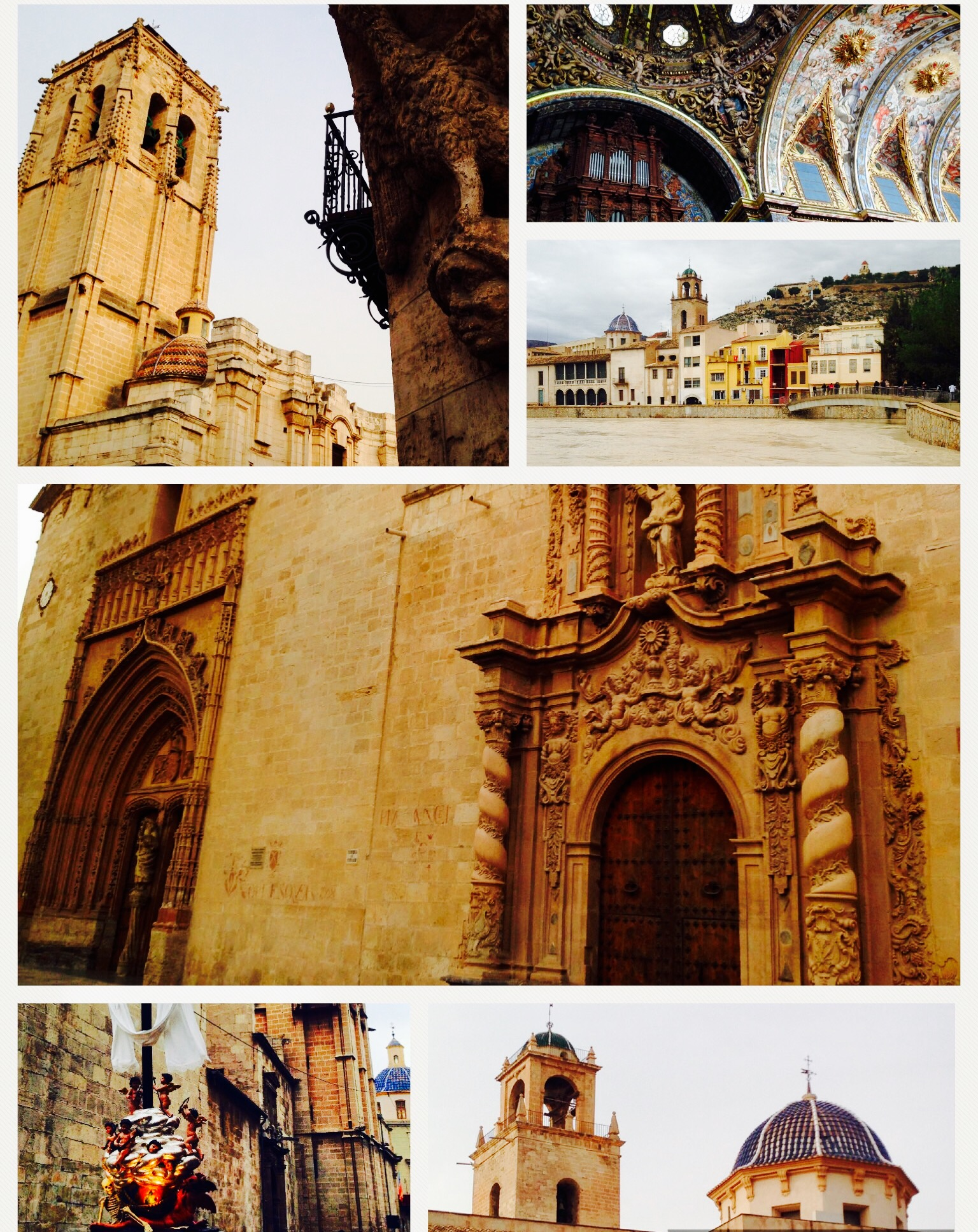

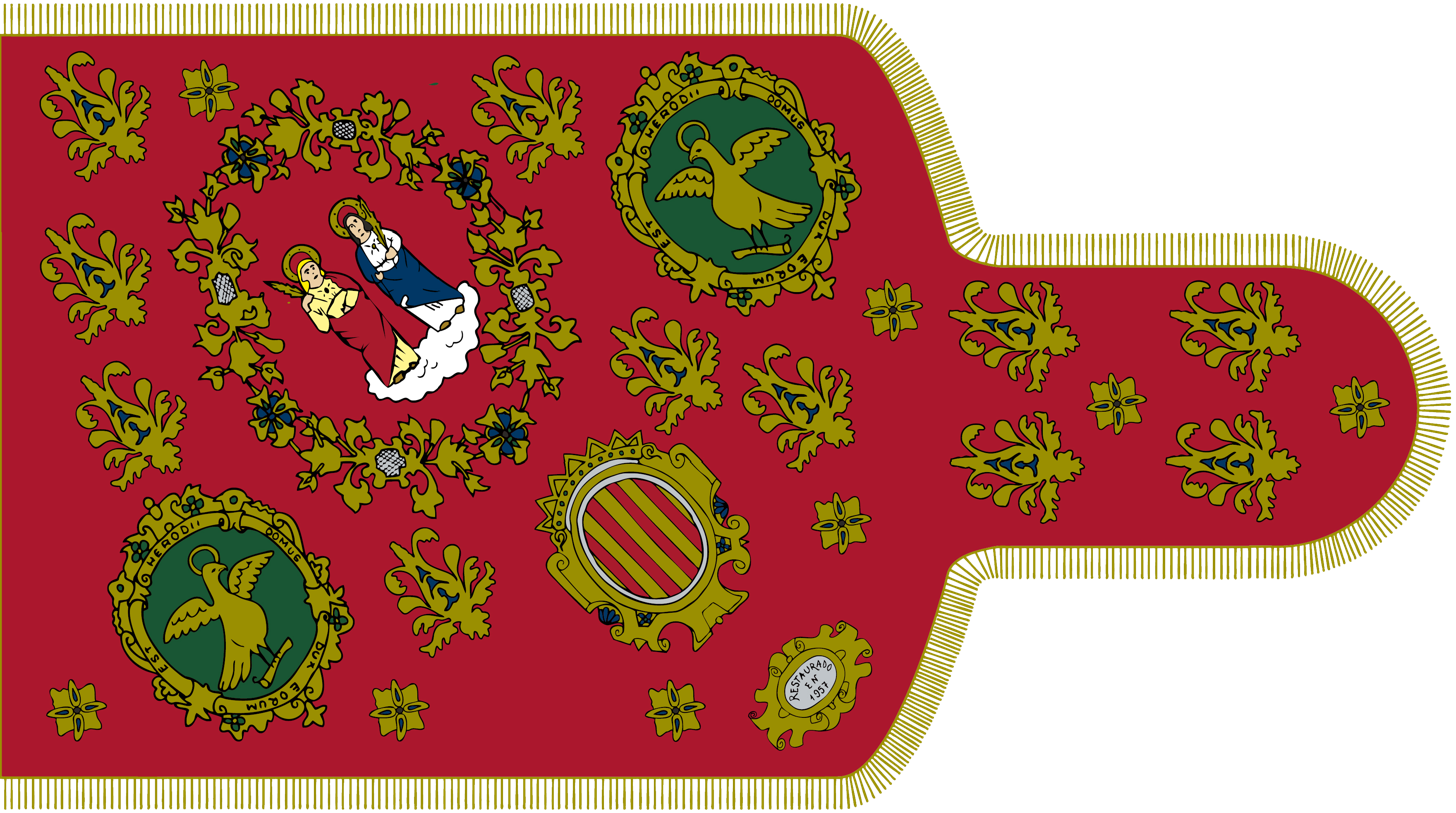
- Flag Coat of arms
- Motto: Muy noble, leal y siempre fiel ciudad de Orihuela (English: Very noble, loyal and always faithful city of Orihuela)
- Location of Orihuela
- Location within Province of Alicante Location within Valencian Community Location within Spain
- Coordinates: 38°5′8″N 0°56′49″W
- Country: Spain
- Autonomous community: Valencian Community
- Province: Alicante
- Comarca: Vega Baja del Segura
- Judicial district: Orihuela

Government
  - Alcalde: Carolina Gracia (2022) (People's Party)

Area
  - Total: 384 km^{2} (148 sq mi)
- Elevation: 25 m (82 ft)

Population (2025-01-01)
  - Total: 84,560
  - Density: 220/km^{2} (570/sq mi)
- Demonyms: Orihuelan • oriolano/a, also orcelitano/a (Sp.) • oriolà, -ana (Val.) (historically)
- Official language(s): Spanish; Valencian
- Linguistic area: Spanish (historically Valencian)
- Time zone: UTC+1 (CET)
  - Summer (DST): UTC+2 (CEST)
- Postal code: 03300 (centre), 03189 (coast) parishes: 03310–03318, 03320, 03369, 03689.
- Website: Official website

Orihuela (Note: Pronunciation of Orihuela: Spanish: [oɾiˈwela].) (historically also known in Valencian as Oriola) (Note: Pronunciation of Oriola: Valencian: [oɾiˈɔla], also [oɾiˈɔlɔ].) is a city and municipality located at the foot of the Sierra de Orihuela mountains in the province of Alicante, Valencian Community, Spain. The city is in one of the Spanish-speaking areas of the Valencian Community.

The city of Orihuela had a population of 33,943 inhabitants at the beginning of 2013. The municipality has an area of 367.19 km^{2}, and stretches all the way down to the Mediterranean coast, west of Torrevieja, and had a total population of 92,000 inhabitants at the beginning of 2013. This includes not only the city of Orihuela, but also the coastal tourist development hub (urbanización turística) of Dehesa de Campoamor with 33,277 inhabitants (2013) and a few other villages.

The river Segura flows through Orihuela. The city was settled by Romans who called it Orcelis and subsequently Aurariola (Latin: "breeze").

== History ==
Orihuela is the capital of the region of the Vega Baja del Segura (floodplain of the Segura River), located near its mouth; it has been the capital of a province and even of a kingdom. The city was named the first city of the province of Alicante, 11 September 1437.

In 576 Orihuela was the capital of the Visigothic province of Aurariola, to which it gave its name. In 713 (5 April) the military man and Count Teodomiro, proclaimed himself King of Tudmir.

At the end of the 9th century, the city was attacked by the Vikings in the first Viking wave across the Mediterranean (858-861).

In 825 the Kingdom of Tudmir became a dependent kingdom under Umayyad control, and the capital was moved to Murcia. In 910 the Kingdom of Tudmir passed to the Emirate of Cordova.

In 1053 the principality of Murcia, part of the Kingdom of Denia, was created. In 1086 it become independent from Denia. In 1212 the area passed to the Kingdom of Murcia.

In 1304 Orihuela was considered to be on the border between the kingdoms of Castile and Aragón. In 1366 it passed to the kingdom of Valencia.

In 1437, it was declared a city and in 1507, Charles V, Holy Roman Emperor made Orihuela capital of the province of Orihuela. In 1737 Alicante, Elche, Monforte, Jijona, Villajoyosa, Agost, Busot, San Juan or Mutxamel became independent from the province of Orihuela, forming the one of Alicante.

In the Middle Ages, a Jewish community was present in Orihuela until its expulsion in 1492.

1799 Orihuela was part of the province of Alicante. In 1810, Napoleon made Orihuela part of the Department of Segura with the capital at Murcia. In 1822, Orihuela passed to the province of Murcia. 1833 it became part of the province of Alicante. In 1873, during the Cantonal Rebellion, it became an independent canton after the Battle of Orihuela. In 1920 nationalistic movements spoke of Orihuela as belonging to the "country of Murcia."

Between 1988 and 2006 various research studies from the Universities of Andalusia, Castile and Murcia demonstrated that Orihuela was more culturally part of Murcia than Valencia in terms of phonetics, lexicon, architecture, agriculture, folklore, musical celebrations, instruments, language, burial customs, gastronomy and varieties.

In recent years, there has been growing support for the "independence" of Orihuela Costa (Dehesa de Campoamor) from Orihuela itself. This is due to the perception among the largely foreign born population of Orihuela Costa that they are being unfairly treated by the local government. For example, the Orihuela Costa's share in the 2010-2014 municipal budget was 6x less than that for the city itself, or 4,2% of the 295 million € budget, even though the Costa creates around 30% of municipal tax income.

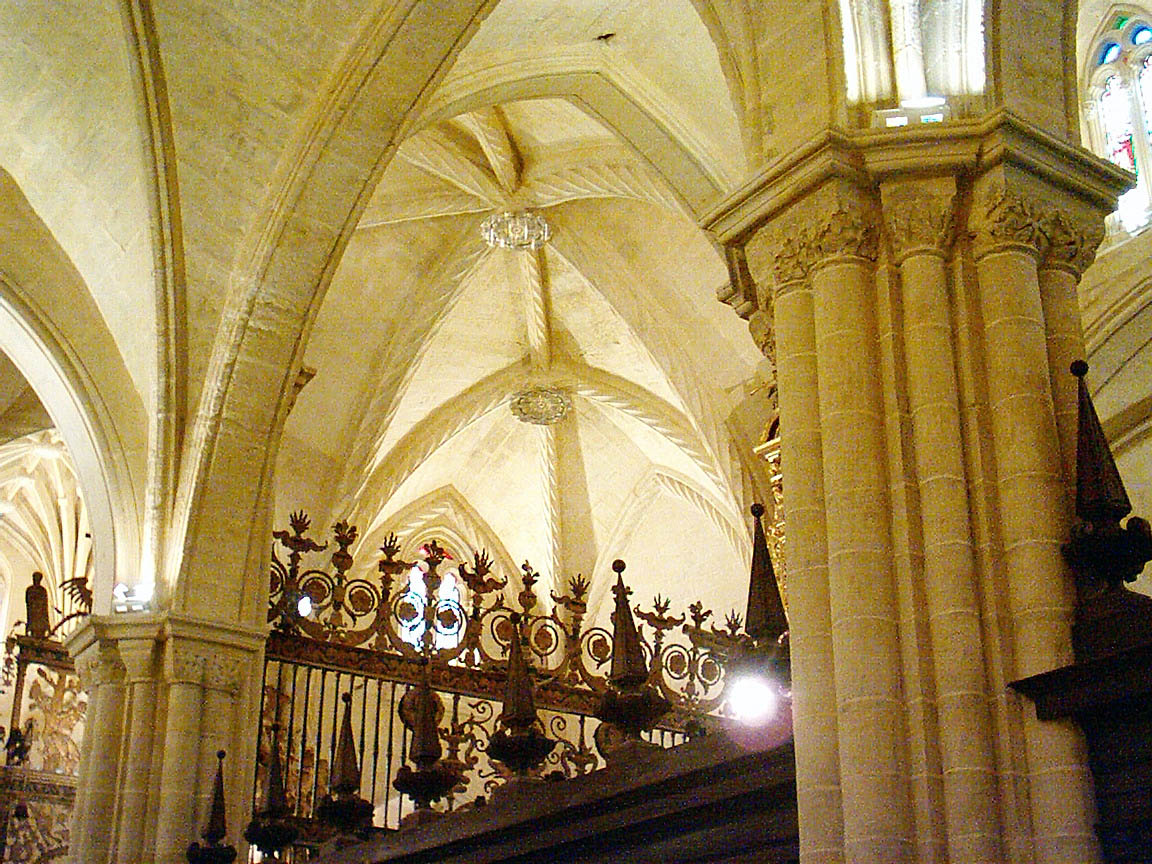
In the cathedral

== City and suburbs ==
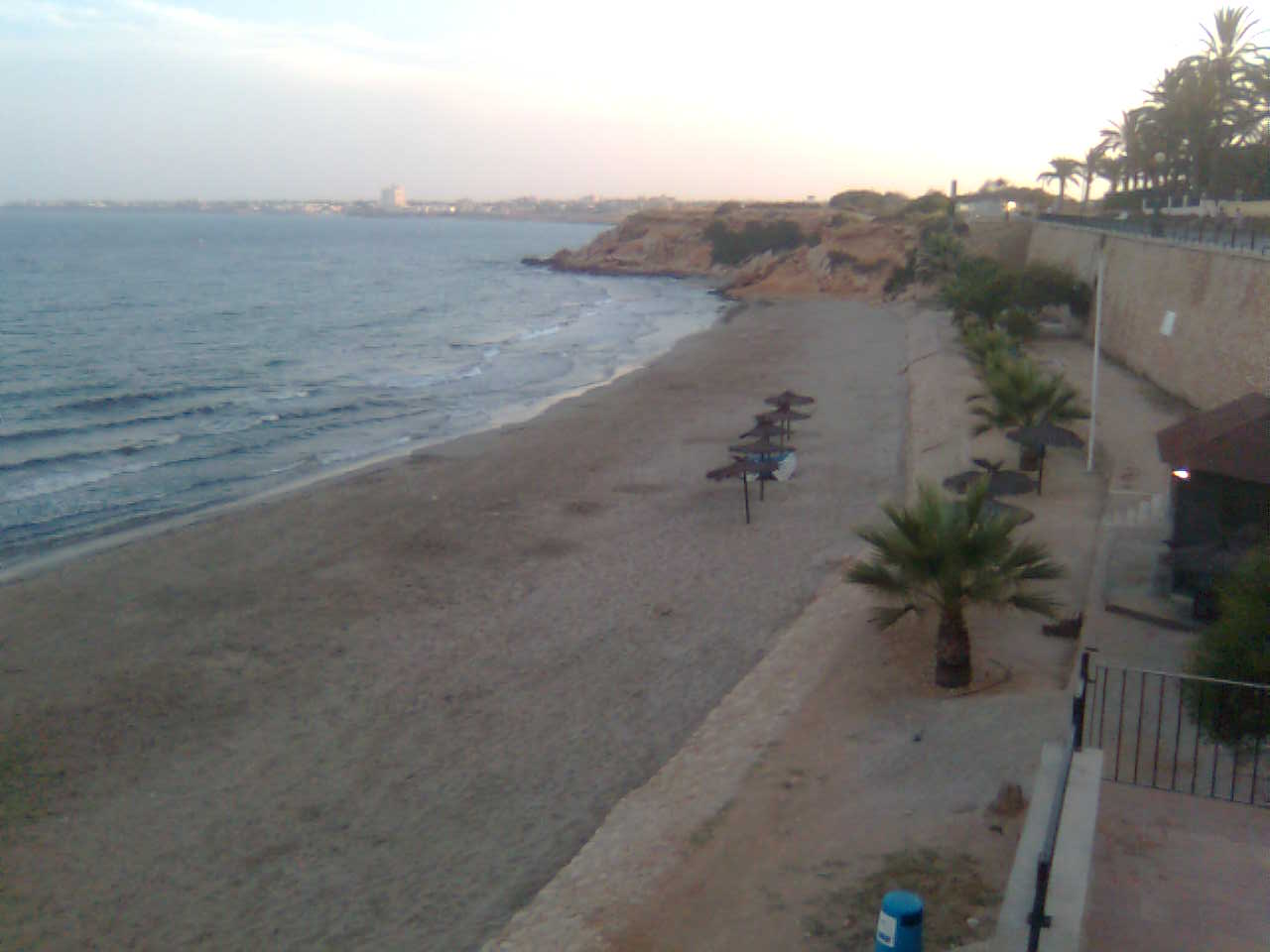
Orihuela coast.

The municipality had a total population of 92,000 inhabitants at the beginning of 2013, of which the city of Orihuela accommodated 33,943. Another major locality within the municipality is the tourist centre of Dehesa de Campoamor, also known as Orihuela Costa, located on the coast, more than 20 km from Orihuela. It had 33,277 inhabitants at the beginning of 2013.

Only 59.6% of the local population are Spanish; the British account for almost 20%, followed by the Irish, Bulgarians and Moroccans, with around 3% each. In total there were people of 106 different nationalities living in Orihuela as of 2013.

The metropolitan area of Orihuela includes the eleven municipalities of Vega Baja del Segura: Benejúzar, Benferri, Beniel, Bigastro, Callosa de Segura, Cox, Jacarilla, Rafal, Redován and Santomera. It had a total population of 151,358 inhabitants at the beginning of 2006, and a total area of 510.3 km^{2}.

The municipality of Orihuela includes the following villages:

- Arneva
- Barbarroja
- Camino de Beniel
- Correntías Altas
- Correntías Bajas
- Correntías Medias
- El Escorratel
- El Mudamiento
- Hurchillo
- La Aparecida
- La Campaneta
- La Murada

The metropolitan area of Orihuela is also part of the larger Murcia-Orihuela conurbation, with a total population of 727,741 inhabitants (2006) and an area of 1,743.5 km^{2}.

== Economy ==
The agriculture of Orihuela is based on lemons, oranges, almonds, olives, palm trees, pomegranates, cotton, hemp and vegetables. It also has an important industry of silk, wool and preserved food. The tourism industry is today the single most important sector in the economy, and has been the main engine of growth for Orihuela in the 21st century.

== Main sights ==
- Orihuela Cathedral - built between the 14th and 16th centuries
- Orihuela Castle - ruins of a mountaintop Arab castle
- Church of Santa Justa y Rufina
- Baroque church of Santo Domingo.
- Santiago Apostol - a 15th-century Catholic church.

The medieval town center houses five National Monuments and an urban layout that is the result of its former rank as a University Centre and Episcopal See.

The holiday celebrations: the processions of Holy Week, and the parades of Moors and Christians, in July, are well-known celebrations.

In September 2012 the shopping mall La Zenia Boulevard opened and became the largest shopping mall in the Costa Blanca and Costa Cálida region with 150 stores and 20 restaurants and bars.

The city is home to the Franciscan convent of Santa Ana.

== Notable people ==
- Miguel Hernández (1910–1942), poet and playwright
- Carolina Pascual (born 1976), rhythmic gymnast
- Bernardo Ruiz (1925–2025), cyclist

== See also ==
- CLARO (political party)
- Playa Flamenca
- Torrevieja
