= Siege of Jerez (1264) =

Battle during the Reconquista

The siege and conquest of Jerez de la Frontera took place on 9 October 1264 (other sources cite 3 October 1266) by the Christian troops of Alfonso X of Castile.
The city had been conquered a few years earlier after the siege of Jerez (1261) from the Andalusian King Ibn Abit, but retaken by the Muslims during the Mudéjar revolt of 1264–1266.
This event is part of the Reconquista, a historical process that took place in Spain between 722 and 1492, during which the Christian Kingdoms of the Iberian Peninsula sought control of the territory that remained under Muslim rule.

== Capitulation of 1261 ==
After the conquest of the city of Seville, Ferdinand III of Castile continued his advance along the lower Guadalquivir river, as a consolidation of the Sevillian campaign and the beginning of the conquest of the southern coast. In 1250 the Kingdom of Castile took Vejer de la Frontera and ten years later El Puerto de Santa María. Cádiz would be conquered on 14 September 1262.

Jerez was conquered a first time in 1261, when the city's population capitulated after the Castilian armies had devastated crops and farms, and the city had suffered a siege of a month.

The Castilian monarch, whose priorities were in Seville in dealing with the repopulation of that city, therefore accepted that in Jerez, "all the Moors remained in their houses in the said town and estates" except for some personalities who were forced to leave, as we know was the case of Ibn Abit. In this way, the city of Jerez and the area near the town became a Castilian protectorate, but completely inhabited by Muslims. The Alcázar was occupied by a Christian garrison under the command of Nuño González de Lara.

== Mudejar revolt and reconquest of the city ==
After the Mudejar revolt of 1264, the situation changed dramatically due to the desire of the Nasrid Sultan Muhammad I of Granada to stop Castilian expansion, and the arrival of reinforcements sent by the Marinid dynasty of Morocco. The revolt by he Muslim vassals of the Castilian monarch began almost simultaneously in Lower Andalusia and Murcia.

In 1264 (other sources indicate 1266) the Muslims of Jerez also rebelled against Christian rule, entering the Alcázar and slaughtering the entire Christian garrison. The Book of the Alcázar tells that the Muslims entered the Alcázar by building a tunnel from which they passed into the enclosure. Another source says that they entered through a wall from which they jumped onto the walls of the Alcázar itself. The Alcázar and city was back in Muslim hands.

Alfonso X responded by besieging the city of Jerez for 5 months. The Muslims attempted to negotiate, but "the King did not want them to leave without anything more than their bodies. Finally the Muslim troops surrendered and handed over the city to the Christians. The monarch decided to leave a garrison of 300 knights in the Alcázar and ordered them to "give and distribute the houses and lands and estates" that made up the district of Jerez, to Christians, facilitating its repopulation by granting favors and privileges.

== Consequences ==
The entire Muslim population was evacuated from the city, so the Mudejar population of the city of Jerez in the years following the reconquest, was very small, approximately 20 residents, a fact that is confirmed by the existence of only one mosque for Islamic worship in the city.
