= Siege of Jerez (1261) =

The siege of Jerez by King Alfonso X of Castile took place in 1261 (in A.H. 659 [6 December 1260–25 November 1261], according to Ibn ʿIdhārī), presumably in the late spring or early summer. It resulted in the incorporation of Jerez de la Frontera into the Crown of Castile.

== The Siege ==
At the time of the siege, Jerez was one of several autonomous Muslim enclaves left over after the collapse of Ibn Hud's principality and the successful reconquista campaigns of Alfonso's father, Ferdinand III. Besides the large kingdoms of Granada, Murcia and Niebla, several small city-states had maintained a precarious independence. At the time of its conquest, Jerez was ruled by Ibn Abit, whom Castilian sources call Abén Habit and style señor (lord) of Jerez.

Shortly after Alfonso succeeded his father in 1252, several of the autonomous towns—Arcos, Jerez, Lebrija, Medina Sidonia and Vejer—that had submitted to Ferdinand and agreed to pay tribute after the fall of Seville in 1248, refused to continue payments to Alfonso. By 1253, Alfonso had forced Jerez to resume tribute and his brother Henry had forced Arcos and Lebrija to surrender. Alfonso refused, however, to honour their father's promise of a vast southern lordship for Henry. His brother rebelled, tried to conquer Niebla, was defeated by Nuño González de Lara near Lebrija in 1255 and went into exile.

In late 1260, Alfonso X summoned the cortes to meet at Seville to advise "concerning the affair of Africa" (fecho de África), that is, the next step in the planned African crusade after the failed crusade of Salé (1260). According to the Chronicle of Alfonso X, which erroneously compresses the events of 1253 and 1261 into the year 1255, the king told the assembly that he desired "to serve God by doing harm to the Moors [and] to seize their lands, especially those near the city of Seville." He then asked the assembly whether he should first attack Niebla or Jerez. The latter was chosen because of its strategic importance to the landward defence of the newly developed port of El Puerto de Santa María. It is probable that the cortes authorised a tax to pay for both the campaign against Jerez and the one to follow against Niebla, since Alfonso was still collecting arrears fifteen years later.

Alfonso, with the help of the king of Granada, Muḥammad I, besieged Jerez for one month before the citizens opened negotiations on their own initiative. Fearing that the valuable orchards and olive groves around the city might be damaged by prolonged warfare, they offered to submit to Castilian rule and pay Alfonso the tribute they had annually given to Ibn Abit if Alfonso left them in control of their property. Since he was still having difficulty bringing Christian settlers to Seville, Alfonso granted the citizens their request. The citizenry then gave Ibn Abit, who had remained in the alcázar (citadel), an ultimatum: come to terms with Alfonso or leave. The lord of Jerez negotiated the surrender of the citadel and a safe conduct for him and all his property.

After the surrender, Alfonso placed Nuño González de Lara in charge of the alcázar with the title of alcaide (castellan). Nuño delegated his authority to a knight named García Gómez Carrillo. The alcázar was resupplied with food and weapons. The Muslims of Jerez remained in possession of their homes and properties inside and outside the walls.

== Aftermath ==
The city was retaken and the garrison massacred by the Muslims during the Mudéjar revolt of 1264–1266. But the Christian troops of Alfonso X of Castile started a new siege, after which the city surrendered on 9 October 1264 (other sources cite 3 October 1266), and the entire muslim population was expelled.

== Sources ==
- González Jiménez, Manuel (1998). "Cortes de Sevilla de 1261". Historia. Instituciones. Documentos. 25: 295–311. doi:10.12795/hid.1998.i25.015. S2CID 252926665.
- Harvey, L. P. (1990). Islamic Spain, 1250 to 1500. Chicago: University of Chicago Press.
- O'Callaghan, Joseph F. (1993). The Learned King: The Reign of Alfonso X of Castile. Philadelphia: University of Pennsylvania Press.
- O'Callaghan, Joseph F. (2011). The Gibraltar Crusade: Castile and the Battle for the Strait. Philadelphia: University of Pennsylvania Press.
- Reis, Jaime Estevão dos (2011). "As campanhas militares de Alfonso X, o Sábio: a cruzada à África e a anexação dos reinos muçulmanos de Jerez e Niebla" (PDF). V Congresso Internacional de História, 2011, Maringá: Anais do Congresso Internacional de História. Maringá: Clichetec. pp. 2528–35.
- Thacker, Shelby; Escobar, José, eds. (2002). Chronicle of Alfonso X. Lexington: University Press of Kentucky.
