= La Murada =

- Village
- Location within Province of Alicante Location within Valencian Community Location within Spain
- Coordinates: 38°10′15″N 0°57′45″W
- Country: Spain
- Autonomous community: Valencian Community
- Province: Province of Alicante
- Municipality: Orihuela
- Elevation: 76 m (249 ft)

Population
  - Total: 3,240

La Murada is a village located in the municipality of Orihuela, in Alicante province, Valencian Community, Spain. As of 2020, it has a population of 3240.

== Geography ==
La Murada is located 60 km west-southwest of Alicante.
