= Gergebil =

Rural locality in Dagestan, Russia

Coordinates: 42°30′12″N 47°03′39″E

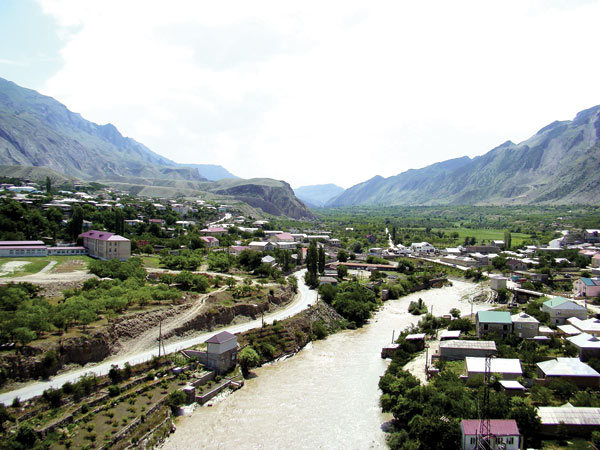
View of Gergebil

Gergebil (Russian: Гергебиль, Avar: Хьаргаби) is a rural locality (a selo) and the administrative center of Gergebilsky District of the Republic of Dagestan, Russia. Population: 5,195 (2010 census); 4,770 (2002 census); 3,755 (1989 Soviet census).
