= Gergebilsky District =

Gergebilsky District Гергебильский район (Russian)
- District

Other transcription(s)
  - Avar: Хьаргаби мухъ
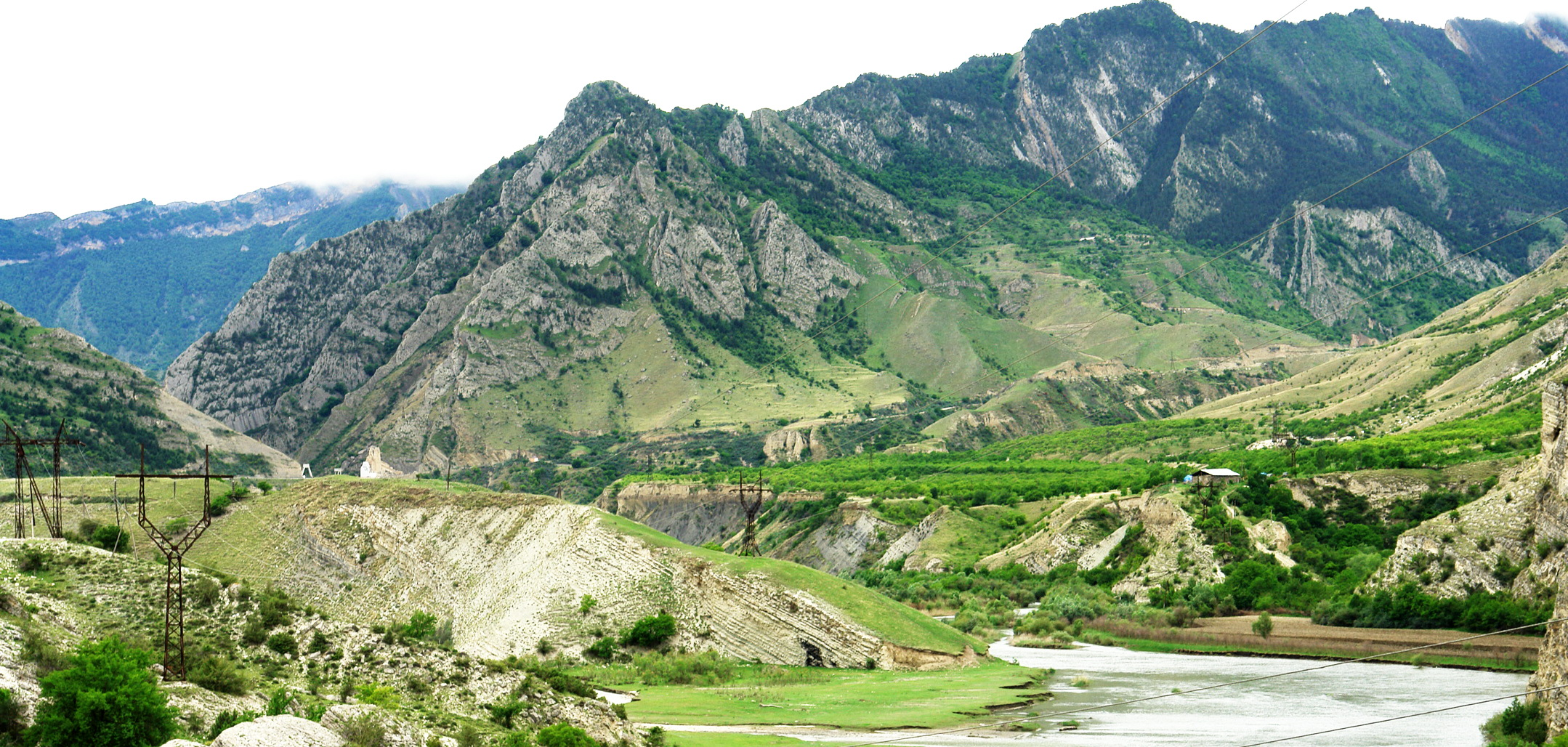
- Karakoisu River, Gergebilsky District

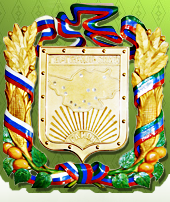
- Coat of arms
- Location of Gergebilsky District in the Republic of Dagestan
- Coordinates: 42°30′N 47°04′E
- Country: Russia
- Federal subject: Republic of Dagestan
- Established: 1944
- Administrative center: Gergebil

Area
  - Total: 341.9 km^{2} (132.0 sq mi)

Population (2010 Census)
  - Total: 19,910
  - Density: 58.23/km^{2} (150.8/sq mi)
  - Urban: 0%
  - Rural: 100%

Administrative structure
  - Administrative divisions: 4 Selsoviets
  - Inhabited localities: 16 rural localities

Municipal structure
  - Municipally incorporated as: Gergebilsky Municipal District
  - Municipal divisions: 0 urban settlements, 10 rural settlements
- Time zone: UTC+3 (MSK)
- OKTMO ID: 82613000
- Website: xn--90adahbtv9a3h.xn

Population of Gergebilsky District
- 2010 Census: 19,910
- 2002 Census: 18,366
- 1989 Census: 11,314
- 1979 Census: 10,768

Gergebilsky District (Russian: Герге́бильский райо́н; Avar: Хьаргаби мухъ) is an administrative and municipal district (raion), one of the forty-one in the Republic of Dagestan, Russia. It is located in the center of the republic. The area of the district is 341.9 square kilometers (132.0 sq mi). Its administrative center is the rural locality (a selo) of Gergebil. As of the 2010 Census, the total population of the district was 19,910, with the population of Gergebil accounting for 26.1% of that number.

== Administrative and municipal status ==
Within the framework of administrative divisions, Gergebilsky District is one of the forty-one in the Republic of Dagestan. The district is divided into four selsoviets which comprise sixteen rural localities. As a municipal division, the district is incorporated as Gergebilsky Municipal District. Its four selsoviets are incorporated as ten rural settlements within the municipal district. The selo of Gergebil serves as the administrative center of both the administrative and municipal district.
