= La Loma (Jaén) =

- Comarca: La Loma

Area
  - City: 1,037.4 km^{2} (400.5 sq mi)

Population (2017)
  - City: 77,162
  - Density: 74.380/km^{2} (192.64/sq mi)
  - Metro: 76.5
- Time zone: UTC+1 (CET)
  - Summer (DST): UTC+2 (CEST)

La Loma (Spanish pronunciation: [ˈnixaɾ]) is a Spanish comarca in the province of Jaén, Andalusia. It lies in the central part of Jaén, and includes two cities declared World Heritage by the UNESCO: Úbeda and Baeza.

La Loma covers an area of 1037 square kilometres. Its population of 77,162 (2017) is mainly concentrated in the cities of Úbeda and Baeza. The main sources of income are in agriculture, especially in the growing of olive trees, although tourism in the historical centres of Úbeda and Baeza also plays an important role.

== Municipalities ==
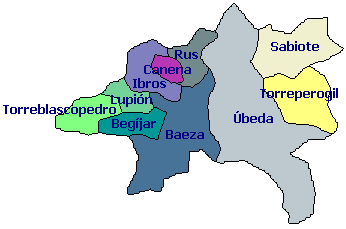
Map of the municipalities of La Loma

- Baeza
- Begíjar
- Ibros
- Lupión
- Torreblascopedro

- Úbeda
- Rus
- Canena
- Sabiote
- Torreperogil
