= Cazalilla =

Cazalilla, Spain
- city
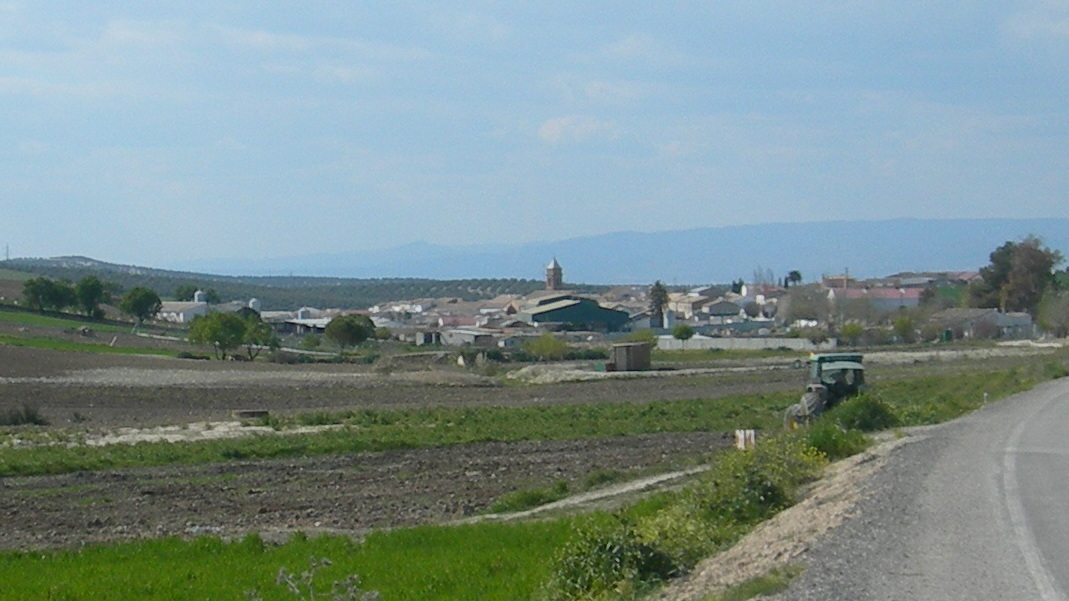

- Flag Coat of arms

- Location in the Province of Jaén Cazalilla (Andalusia) Cazalilla (Spain)
- Coordinates: 37°59′N 3°53′W
- Country: Spain
- Autonomous community: Andalusia
- Province: Jaén
- Municipality: Cazalilla

Area
  - Total: 46 km^{2} (18 sq mi)
- Elevation: 300 m (980 ft)

Population (2025-01-01)
  - Total: 762
  - Density: 17/km^{2} (43/sq mi)
- Time zone: UTC+1 (CET)
  - Summer (DST): UTC+2 (CEST)

Cazalilla is a village located in the province of Jaén, Spain. According to the 2024 INE figures, the village had a population of 771 inhabitants.

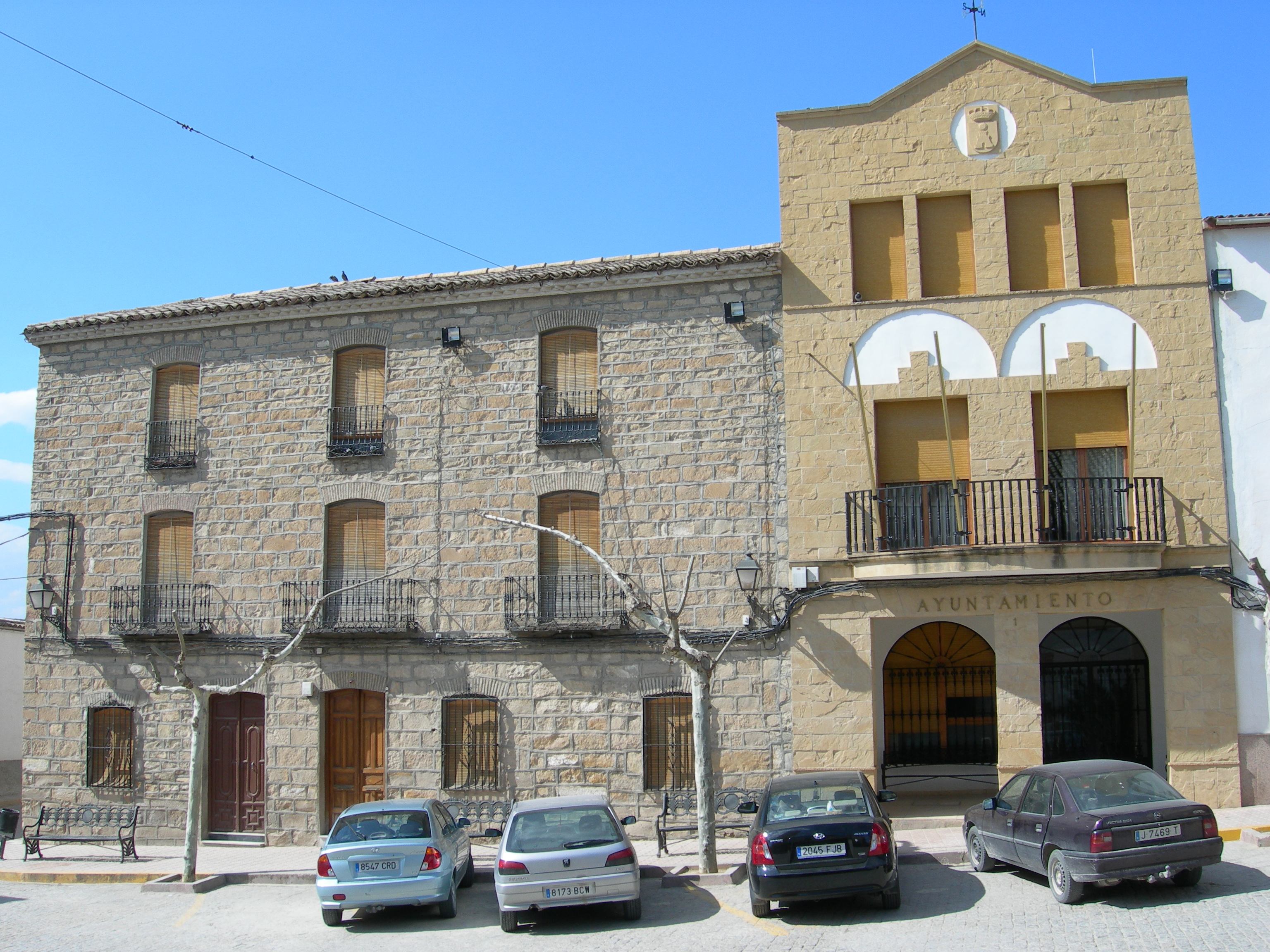
Facade of the Cazalilla Town Hall, Jaén

== See also ==
- List of municipalities in Jaén
