= Hinojares =

- Municipality
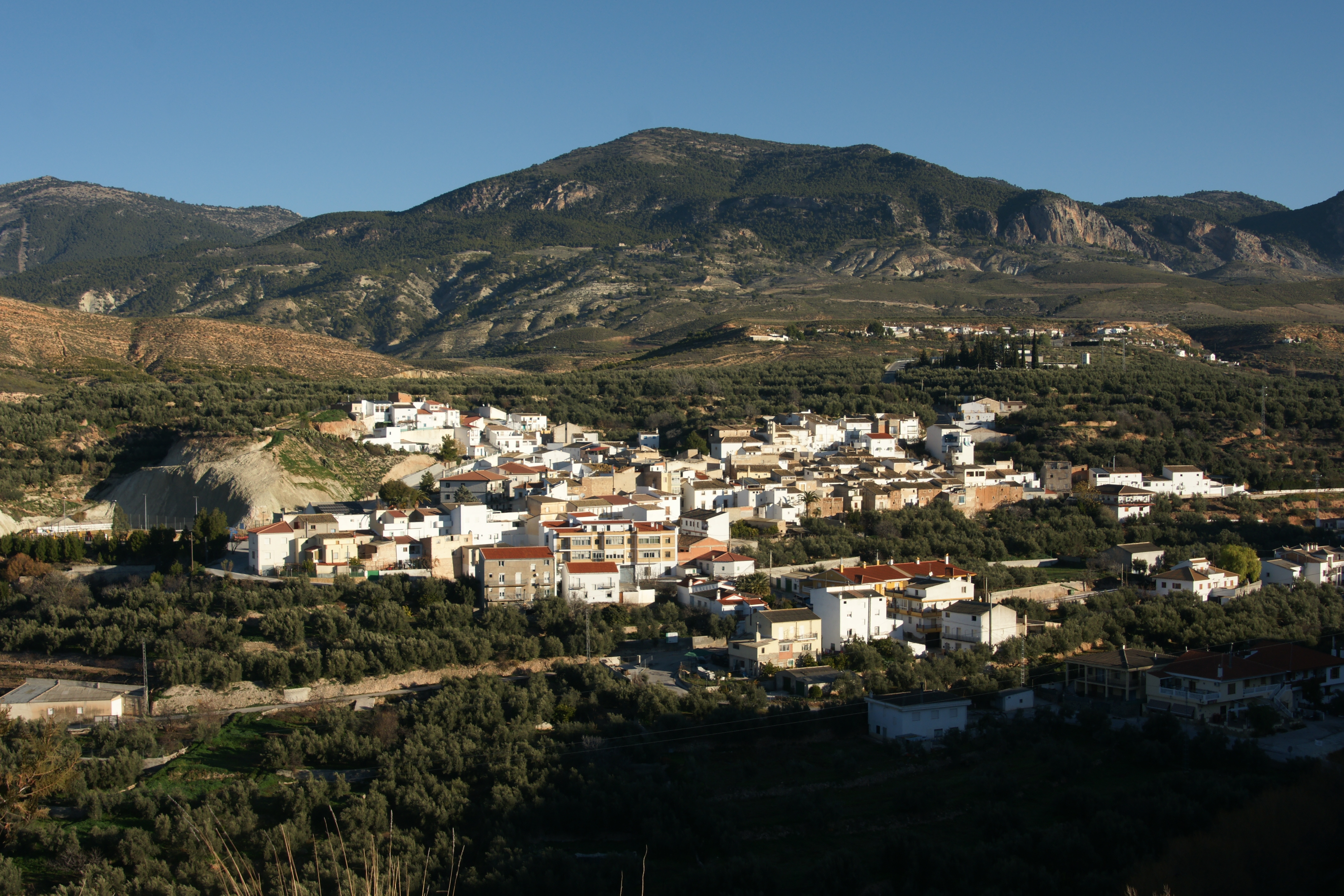
- View of the town

- Coat of arms

- Location in the Province of Jaén Hinojares (Andalusia) Hinojares (Spain)
- Coordinates: 37°43′N 2°59′W
- Country: Spain
- Autonomous community: Andalusia
- Province: Jaén
- Comarca: Sierra de Cazorla Comarca

Area
  - Total: 40.04 km^{2} (15.46 sq mi)
- Elevation: 672 m (2,205 ft)

Population (2025-01-01)
  - Total: 335
  - Density: 8.37/km^{2} (21.7/sq mi)
- Demonym: Hinojareños
- Time zone: UTC+1 (CET)
  - Summer (DST): UTC+2 (CEST)
- Postal code: 23486

Hinojares is a town located in the province of Jaén, Spain. According to the 2014 census the municipality has a population of 370 inhabitants.

The village of Cuenca belongs to the municipality.

== See also ==
- Sierra de Cazorla
- List of municipalities in Jaén
