= Santiago de Calatrava =

Santiago de Calatrava, Spain
- city
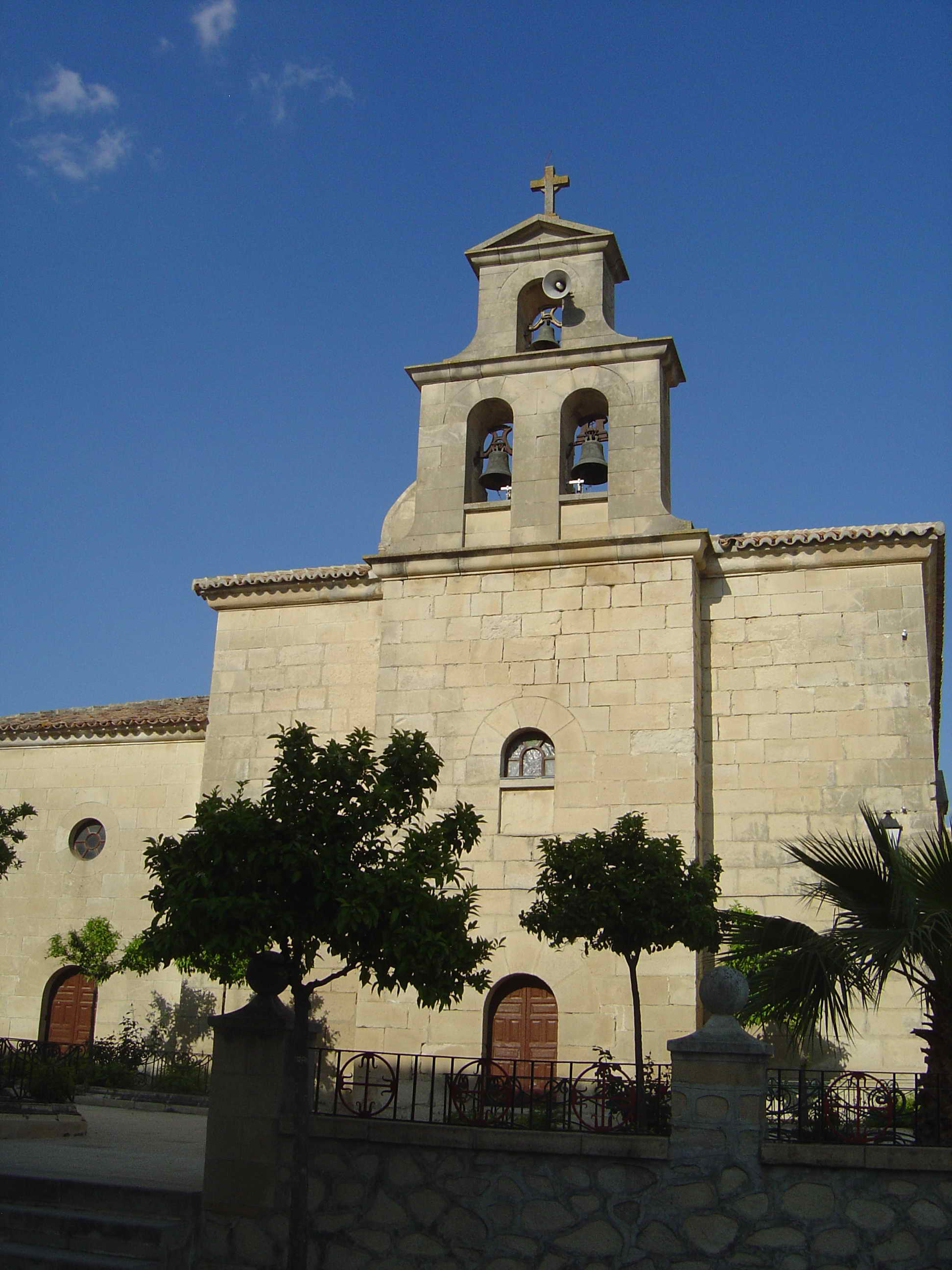
- Church of Our Lady of the Star, Santiago de Calatrava, Jaén, Spain

- Flag Coat of arms

- Location in the Province of Jaén Santiago de Calatrava (Andalusia) Santiago de Calatrava (Spain)
- Coordinates: 37°45′N 4°10′W
- Country: Spain
- Autonomous community: Andalusia
- Province: Jaén
- Municipality: Santiago de Calatrava

Area
  - Total: 47 km^{2} (18 sq mi)
- Elevation: 386 m (1,266 ft)

Population (2025-01-01)
  - Total: 660
  - Density: 14/km^{2} (36/sq mi)
- Time zone: UTC+1 (CET)
  - Summer (DST): UTC+2 (CEST)

Santiago de Calatrava is a city located in the province of Jaén, Spain. According to the 2005 census (INE), the city has a population of 862 inhabitants.

== See also ==
- List of municipalities in Jaén
