= Jimena, Spain =

Jimena
- municipality
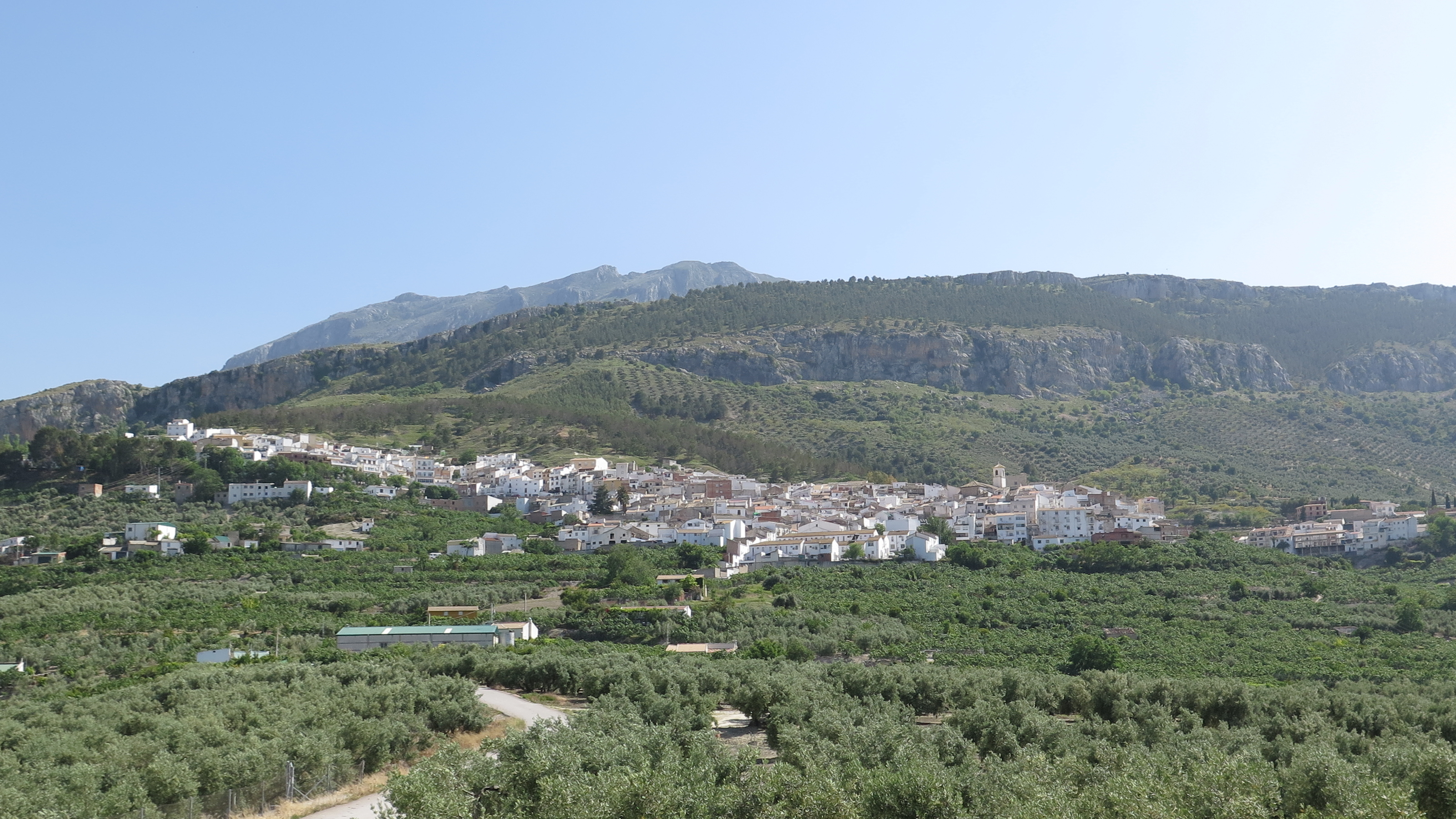

- Flag Coat of arms

- Location in the Province of Jaén Jimena, Spain (Andalusia) Jimena, Spain (Spain)
- Coordinates: 37.841833°N 3.479733°W
- Country: Spain
- Autonomous community: Andalusia
- Province: Jaén
- Municipality: Jimena

Population (2025-01-01)
  - Total: 1,219
- Time zone: UTC+1 (CET)
  - Summer (DST): UTC+2 (CEST)

Jimena is a city the Province of Jaén, Andalusia, Spain, with 1489 inhabitants according to the National Statistics Institute of Spain in 2007.

== Geography and heritage ==
It is in the northwest area of Sierra Magina, which portion is mountainous terrain southeast and included in the natural park of Sierra Magina.

The rest of the field is the predominant crop in the olive grove. Economic activity is based on olive growing and processing industry, complemented by the cultivation of the fig tree and use of the fig and fig.

The Canavan pine (forest of ancient pines and exceptional size) has been declared a Natural Monument for its ecological and scenic value.

His Feasts of 7 to 10 September, where we can enjoy the procession and their carriages, to which numerous people come from other villages around.

== History ==
Jimena has a rich legacy of prehistoric times, a group of rock paintings in the Cave of the Rook, which highlight the culture of groups of pastors between the fourth and third millennia BC populated the Southern Sierras. In this phase have been recorded several settlements in the municipality, among which the Cerro Alcalá, fundamental reference for the prehistory and early history of this town as well as medieval times.

In the Iberian stage Cerro Alcalá is one of the oppida in the sixth century BC which will held in the following centuries until the Roman era. Some researchers have linked Alcala to Cerro Ossigi referring to the written sources.

Epigraphic and constructive Numerous findings show that this settlement would hold some sort of Roman status as Municipium.

In the Arab period there was an intense occupation of the town of Jimena by small or rural farmsteads. The town had several forts for shelter, Fountain of the Moor, Hill Alcalá or mentioned in the chronicles as San Istibin or San Astabin, a name that has been in a spot close to Jimena, Santisteban. Reports suggest that this was one of the castles in which the Banu Business rebelled against the power of the emir of Córdoba. Jimena (Xemena) could be another of these fortified castles or a farm after the Christian conquest.

Jimena was conquered by Ferdinand III the day of Santiago, 1234 and integrated into the land of the Council of Baeza. In 1284 it became the property of Don Pedro Ruy de Berrio. During the fourteenth and fifteenth centuries was a small manor until in 1434 King John II gave to the Order of Calatrava, which was the task of Torres, Canena, inheriting from Jimena and pray.

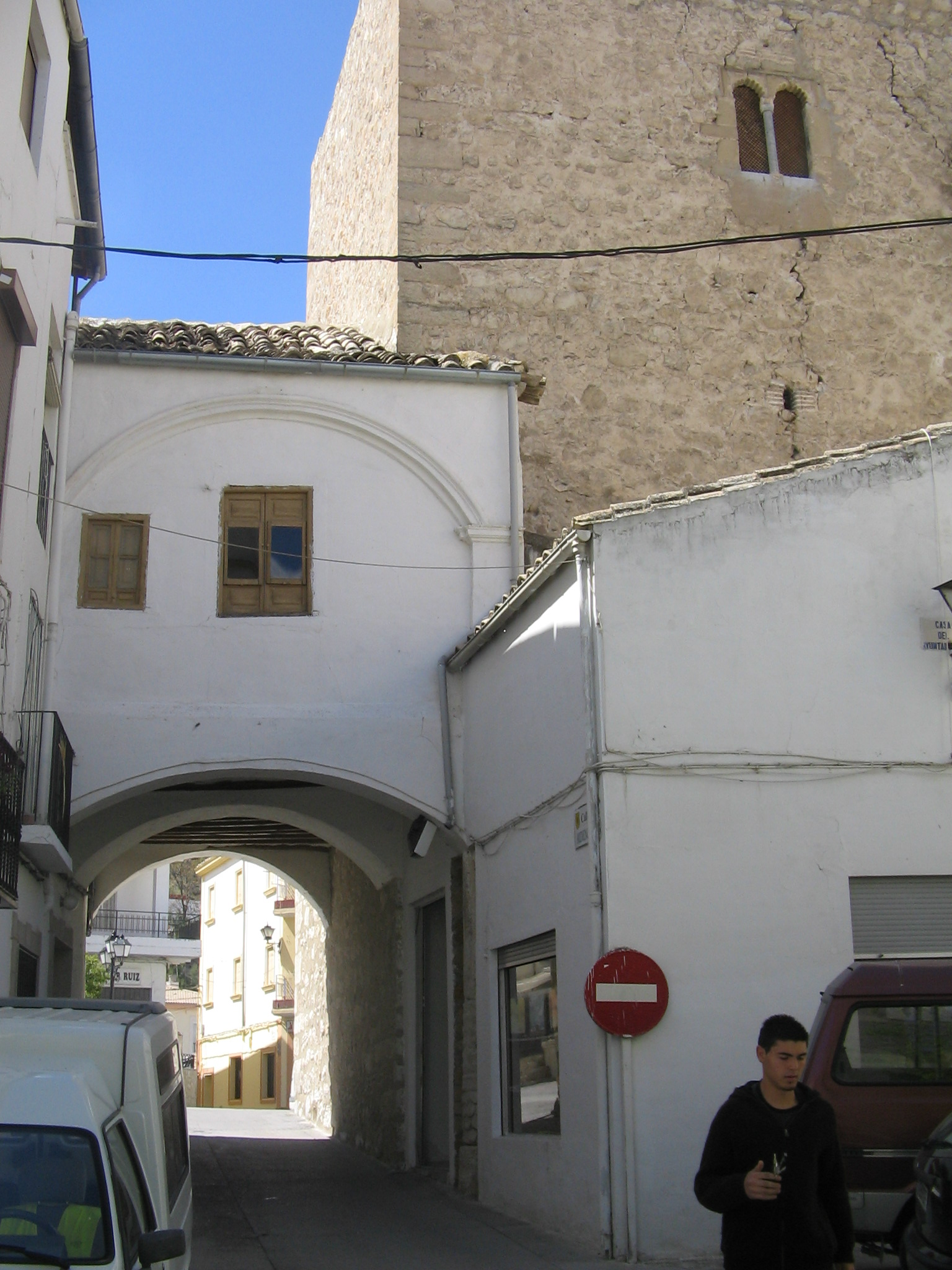
Tower of the Arab wall that took the town.

Jimena In the sixteenth century, in line with Baeza, commoner in the conflict in the Castle of Charles V, even served as an outpost hidden from community members. Completion of these events was sold by the Emperor Charles V to his secretary, Francisco de los Cobos. From this date Jimena was the domain of Don Francisco de los Cobos and his descendants after the Marquis of Camarasa, until the extinction of the noble privileges in 1812.

== Jimena Patron ==
Our Lady of the Remedies. The popular voice has this Marian title appeared in August, the royal scribe Luis Martinez. In the place of finding a hermitage built to worship the Virgin received and is where pilgrims are directed to honor since 1600 is its patron and mayor of the village life.

== Canavan Sanctuary ==
Chapel built in honor of the Virgen de los Remedios. By Luis Martinez found the image in 1600, rose in the same place of the appearance this hermitage, which best could be called "cave" or "niche" and there was the picture for many years, until the people decided to build a true temple.

== See also ==
- List of municipalities in Jaén
