= Cabra del Santo Cristo =

- city
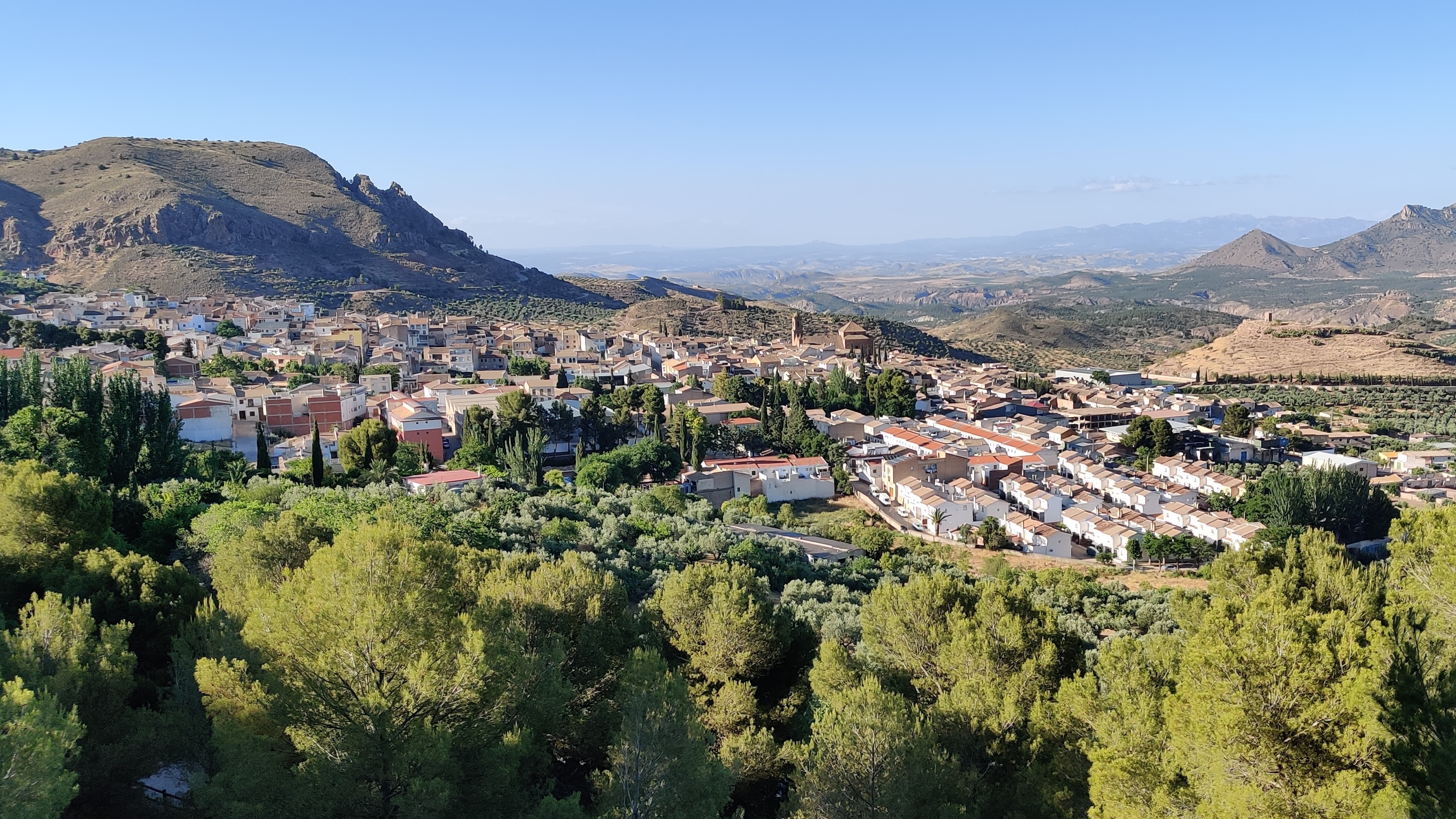

- Flag Coat of arms

- Location in the Province of Jaén Cabra del Santo Cristo (Andalusia) Cabra del Santo Cristo (Spain)
- Coordinates: 37°42′12.74″N 3°17′13.5″W
- Country: Spain
- Autonomous community: Andalusia
- Province: Jaén
- Municipality: Cabra del Santo Cristo

Area
  - Total: 186 km^{2} (72 sq mi)
- Elevation: 942 m (3,091 ft)

Population (2025-01-01)
  - Total: 1,639
  - Density: 8.81/km^{2} (22.8/sq mi)
- Time zone: UTC+1 (CET)
  - Summer (DST): UTC+2 (CEST)

Cabra del Santo Cristo is a town located in the province of Jaén, Spain. According to 2024 INE figures, the town had a population of 1,651 inhabitants.

== See also ==
- List of municipalities in Jaén
