= Fuerte del Rey =

Fuerte del Rey, Spain
- city
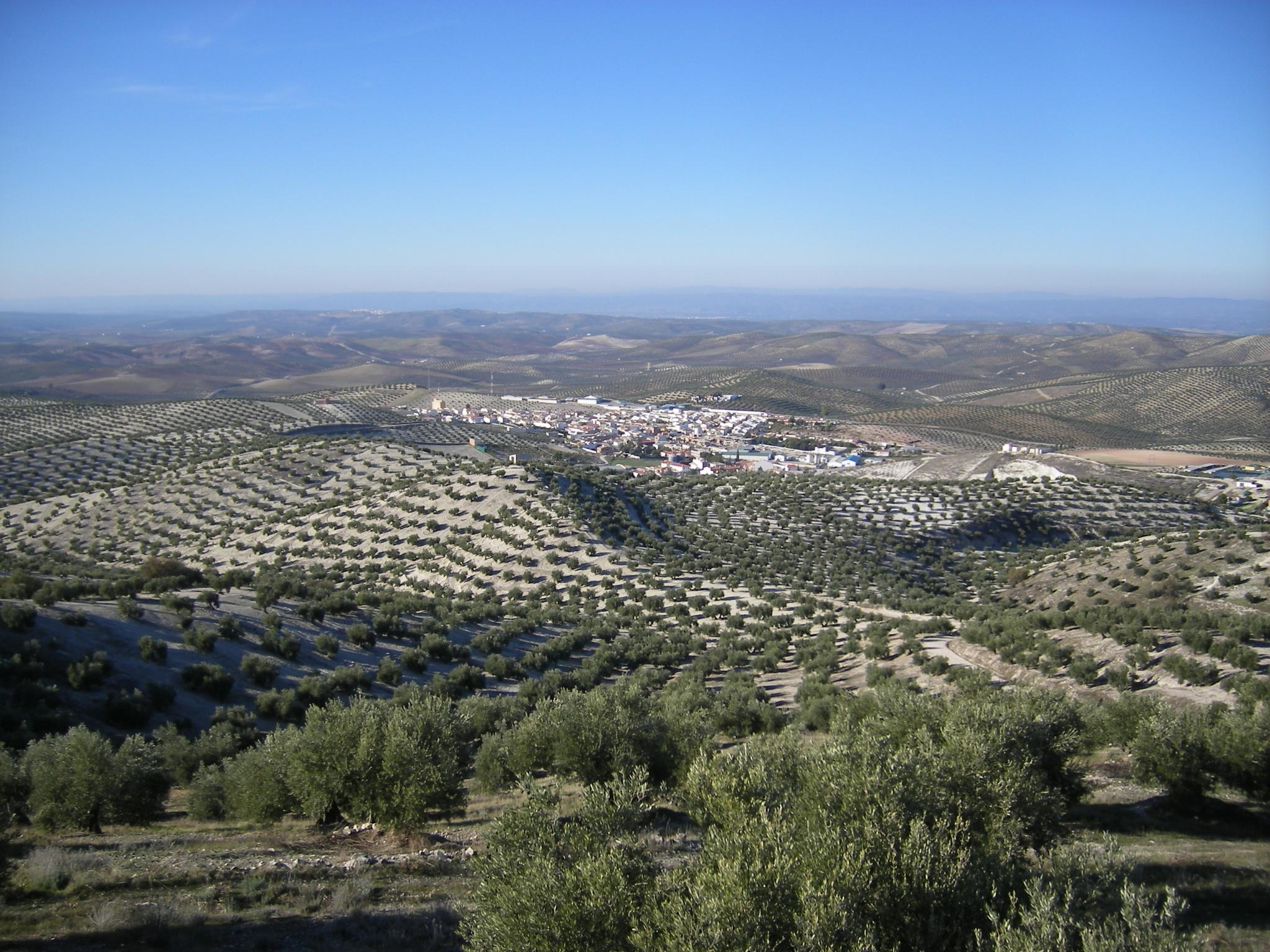

- Coat of arms

- Location in the Province of Jaén Fuerte del Rey (Andalusia) Fuerte del Rey (Spain)
- Coordinates: 37°52′N 3°53′W
- Country: Spain
- Autonomous community: Andalusia
- Province: Jaén
- Municipality: Fuerte del Rey

Area
  - Total: 34.43 km^{2} (13.29 sq mi)
- Elevation: 432 m (1,417 ft)

Population (2025-01-01)
  - Total: 1,348
  - Density: 39.15/km^{2} (101.4/sq mi)
- Time zone: UTC+1 (CET)
  - Summer (DST): UTC+2 (CEST)

Fuerte del Rey is a city located in the province of Jaén, Spain. According to 2024 INE figures, the city had a population of 1342 inhabitants.

== See also ==
- List of municipalities in Jaén
