= Larva, Spain =

Municipality in Jaen, Spain

Larva
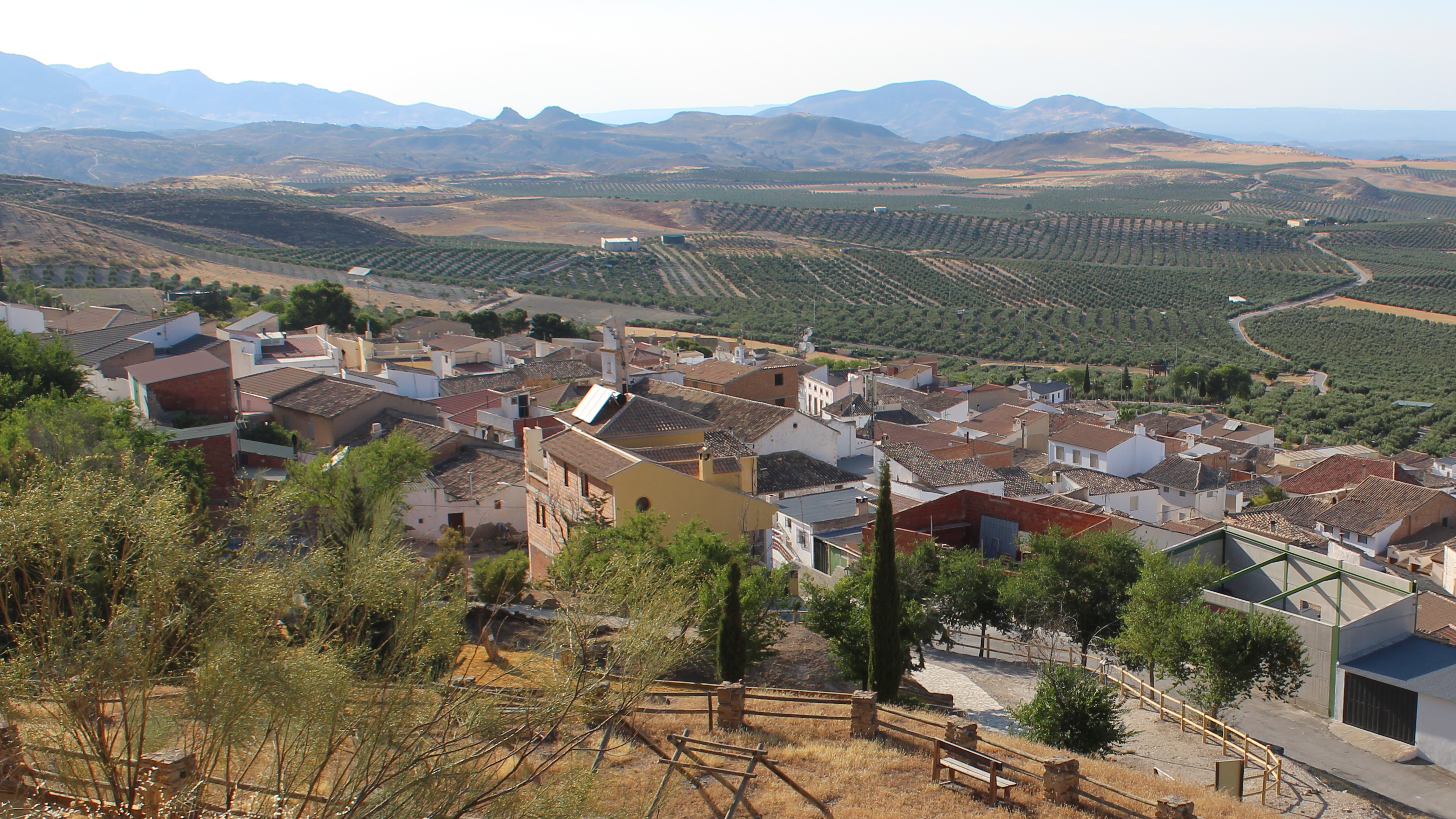
- View of Larva

- Flag Coat of arms

- Location in the Province of Jaén Larva, Spain (Andalusia) Larva, Spain (Spain)
- Coordinates: 37°45′N 3°12′W
- Country: Spain
- Autonomous community: Andalusia
- Province: Jaén

Area
  - Total: 41.76 km^{2} (16.12 sq mi)
- Elevation: 720 m (2,360 ft)

Population (2025-01-01)
  - Total: 435
  - Density: 10.4/km^{2} (27.0/sq mi)
- Time zone: UTC+1 (CET)
  - Summer (DST): UTC+2 (CEST)

Larva is a municipality in the province of Jaén, Spain.

This mountain community can be found in the south-eastern part of the province, sandwiched between the Sierra del Pozo and the Sierra Mágina ranges. Olive groves predominate the landscape throughout the majority of it.

== History ==
The spring that served as the original focal point of the village was located on the estate of Cortijo de San Pedro, which originally belonged to Quesada and later passed into the ownership of Cabra del Santo Cristo.

Its history is intertwined with that of the other villages that make up the area. By the 1950s, the population had increased to 2,000 thanks to the economic activity that was based on the esparto grass. The decline in participation in this activity contributed to the worsening of the economic situation in the village.

== See also ==
- List of municipalities in Jaén
