= Villardompardo =

- city
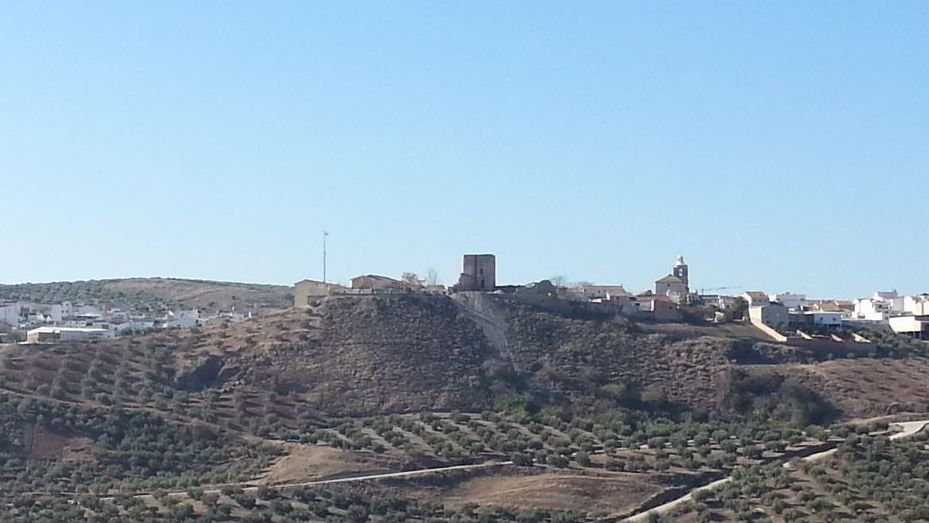

- Flag Coat of arms

- Location in the Province of Jaén Villardompardo (Andalusia) Villardompardo (Spain)
- Coordinates: 37.50°N 3.60°W
- Country: Spain
- Autonomous community: Andalusia
- Province: Jaén
- Municipality: Villardompardo

Area
  - Total: 17 km^{2} (6.6 sq mi)
- Elevation: 470 m (1,540 ft)

Population (2025-01-01)
  - Total: 893
  - Density: 53/km^{2} (140/sq mi)
- Time zone: UTC+1 (CET)
  - Summer (DST): UTC+2 (CEST)

Villardompardo is a city located in the province of Jaén, Spain. According to the 2005 census (INE), the city had a population of 1,172 inhabitants.

== See also ==
- List of municipalities in Jaén
