= Villatorres =

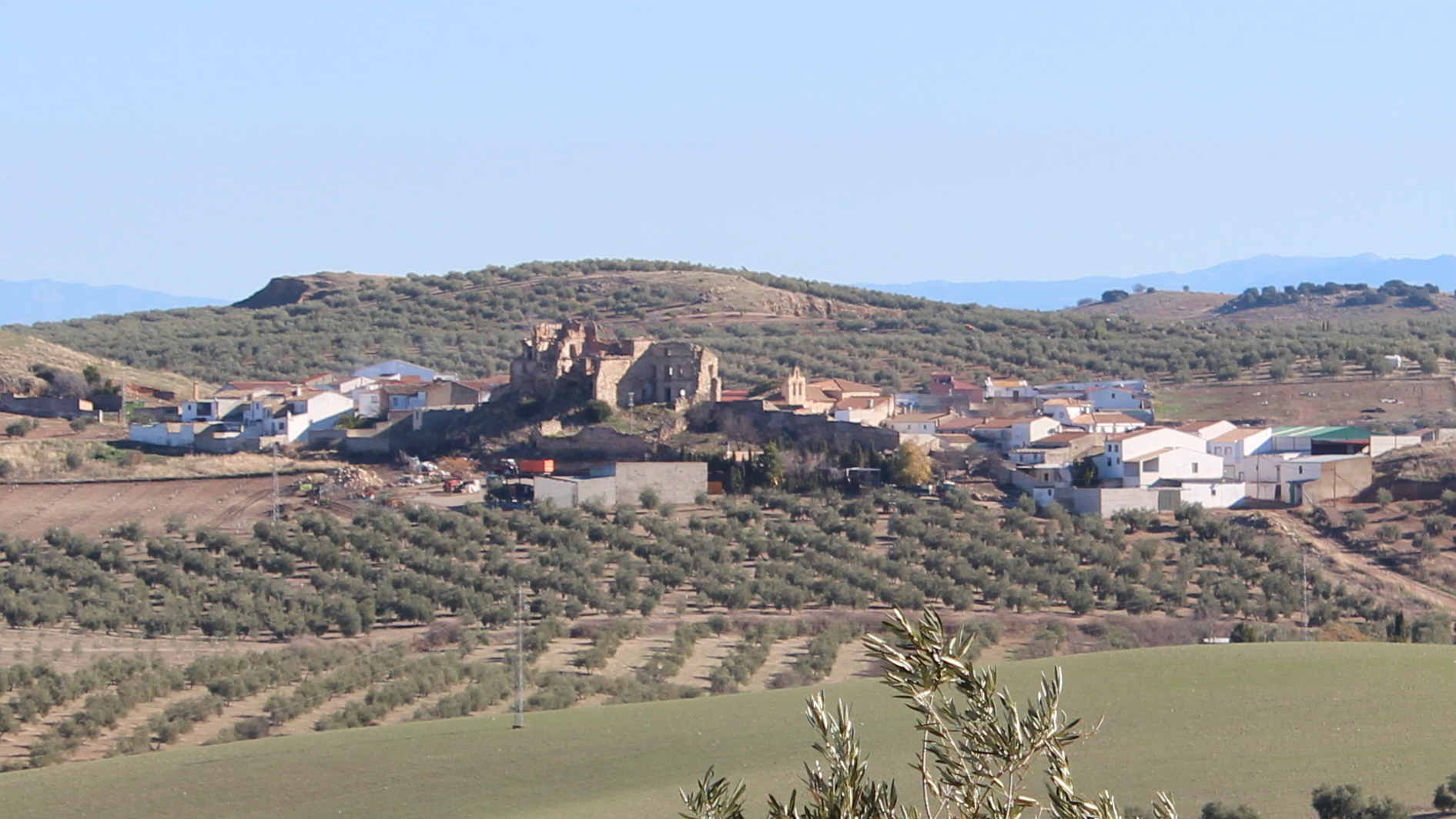

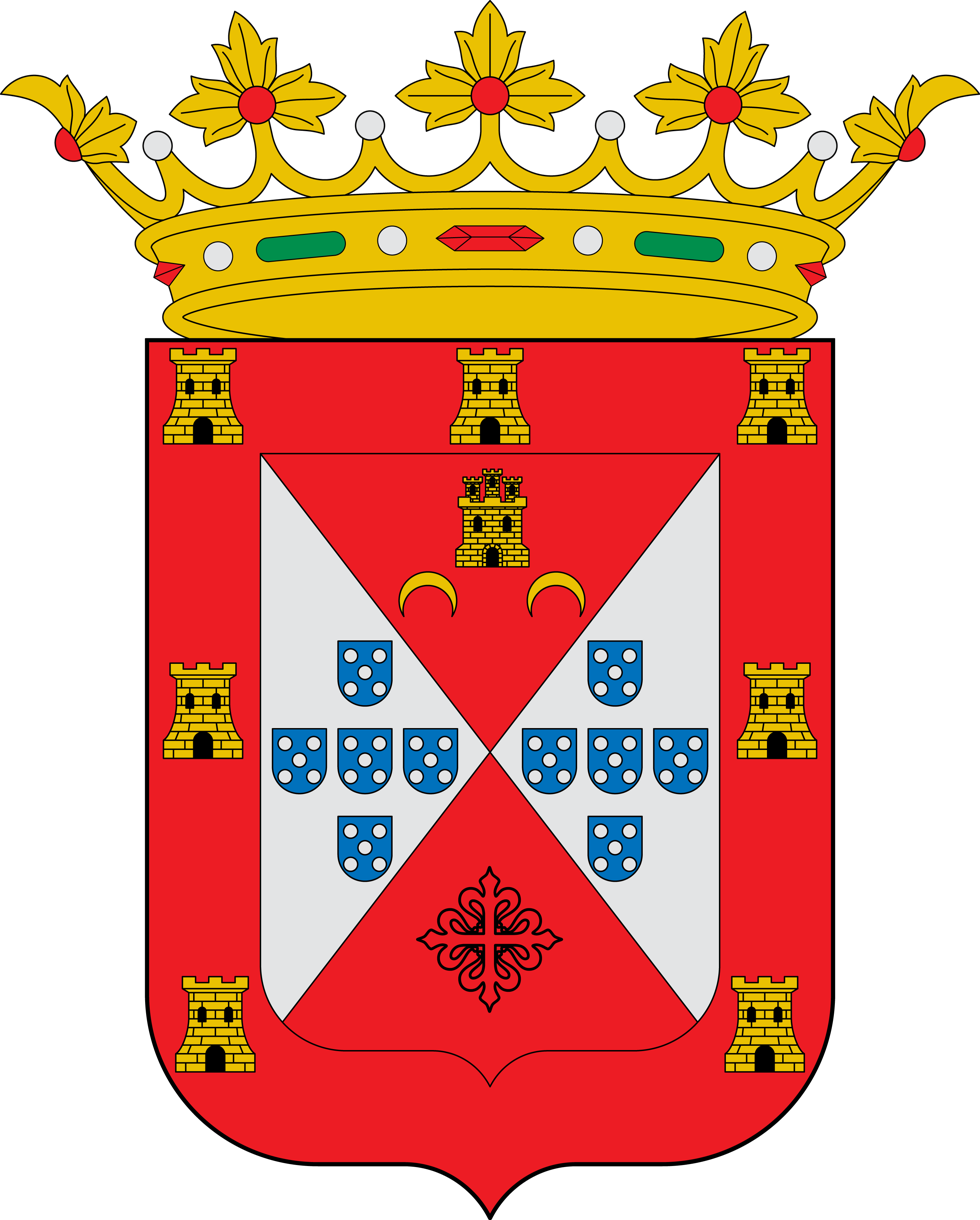
- Coat of arms

- Location in the Province of Jaén Villatorres (Andalusia) Villatorres (Spain)
- Coordinates: 37°56′6″N 3°41′32″W
- Country: Spain
- Autonomous community: Andalusia
- Province: Jaén

Government
  - Mayor: Francisco Ramón Almagro Bergillos (PP)

Area
  - Total: 72.71 km^{2} (28.07 sq mi)
- Elevation: 347 m (1,138 ft)

Population (2025-01-01)
  - Total: 4,259
  - Density: 58.58/km^{2} (151.7/sq mi)
- Time zone: UTC+1 (CET)
  - Summer (DST): UTC+2 (CEST)
- Website: http://villatorres.es (in Spanish)

Villatorres is a municipality in the province of Jaén, Spain.

== See also ==
- List of municipalities in Jaén
