= La Iruela =

La Iruela, Spain
- town
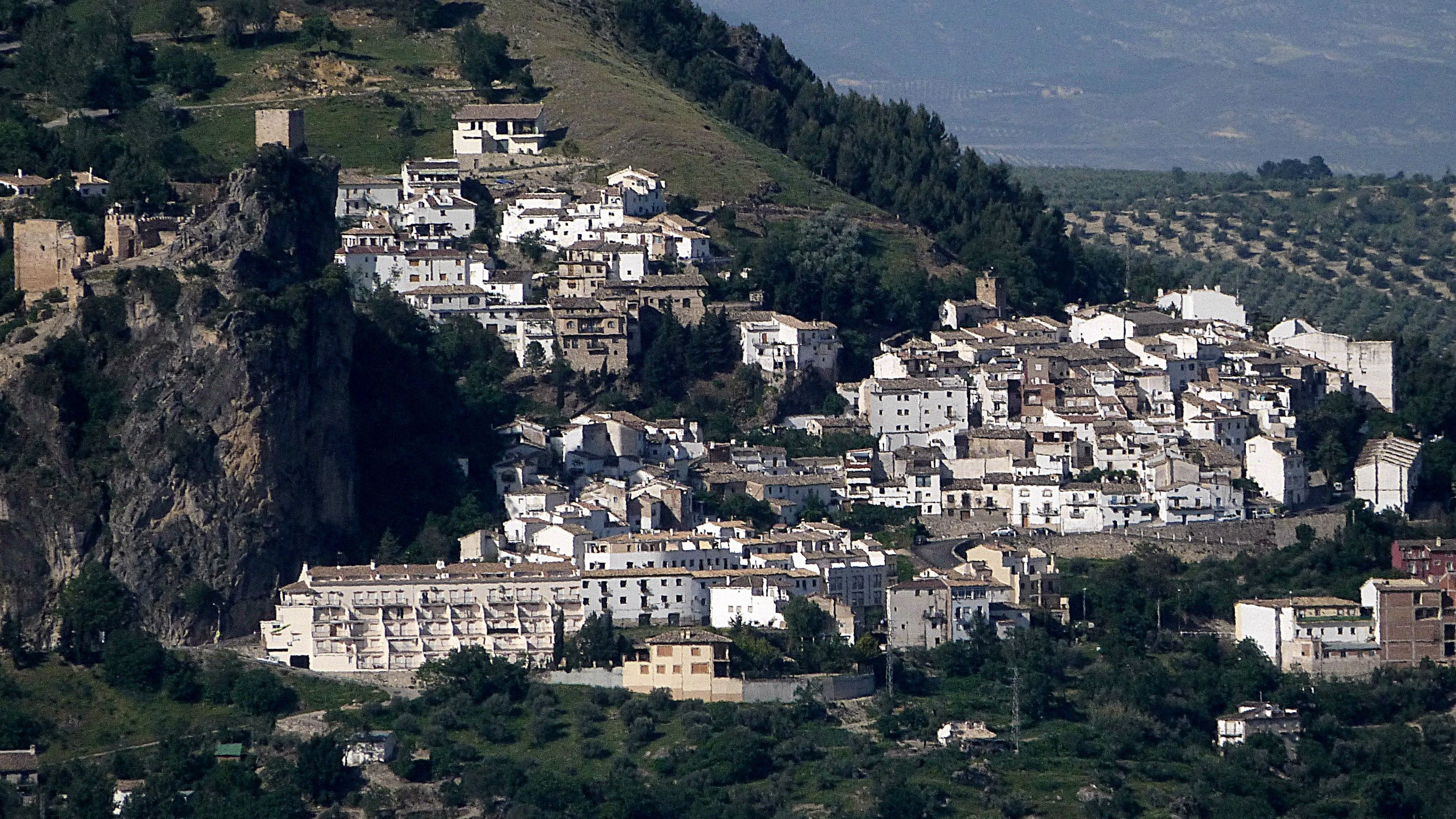

- Flag Coat of arms

- Location in the Province of Jaén La Iruela (Andalusia) La Iruela (Spain)
- Coordinates: 37°55′N 3°00′W
- Country: Spain
- Autonomous community: Andalusia
- Province: Jaén
- Municipality: La Iruela

Area
  - Total: 124 km^{2} (48 sq mi)
- Elevation: 954 m (3,130 ft)

Population (2025-01-01)
  - Total: 1,819
  - Density: 14.7/km^{2} (38.0/sq mi)
- Time zone: UTC+1 (CET)
  - Summer (DST): UTC+2 (CEST)
- Website: https://www.lairuela.com/

La Iruela is a town located in the province of Jaén, Andalusia, Spain. It sits on a peak of the Sierra de Cazorla and is home to the ruins of an 11th-century Moorish, and later Templar, fortress which towers over the road from Cazorla to the Sierras de Cazorla, Segura y Las Villas Natural Park. According to the 2005 census (INE), the city has a population of 1894 inhabitants.

== See also ==
- List of municipalities in Jaén
