= List of municipalities in Jaén =

Map of Spain with the province of Jaén highlighted

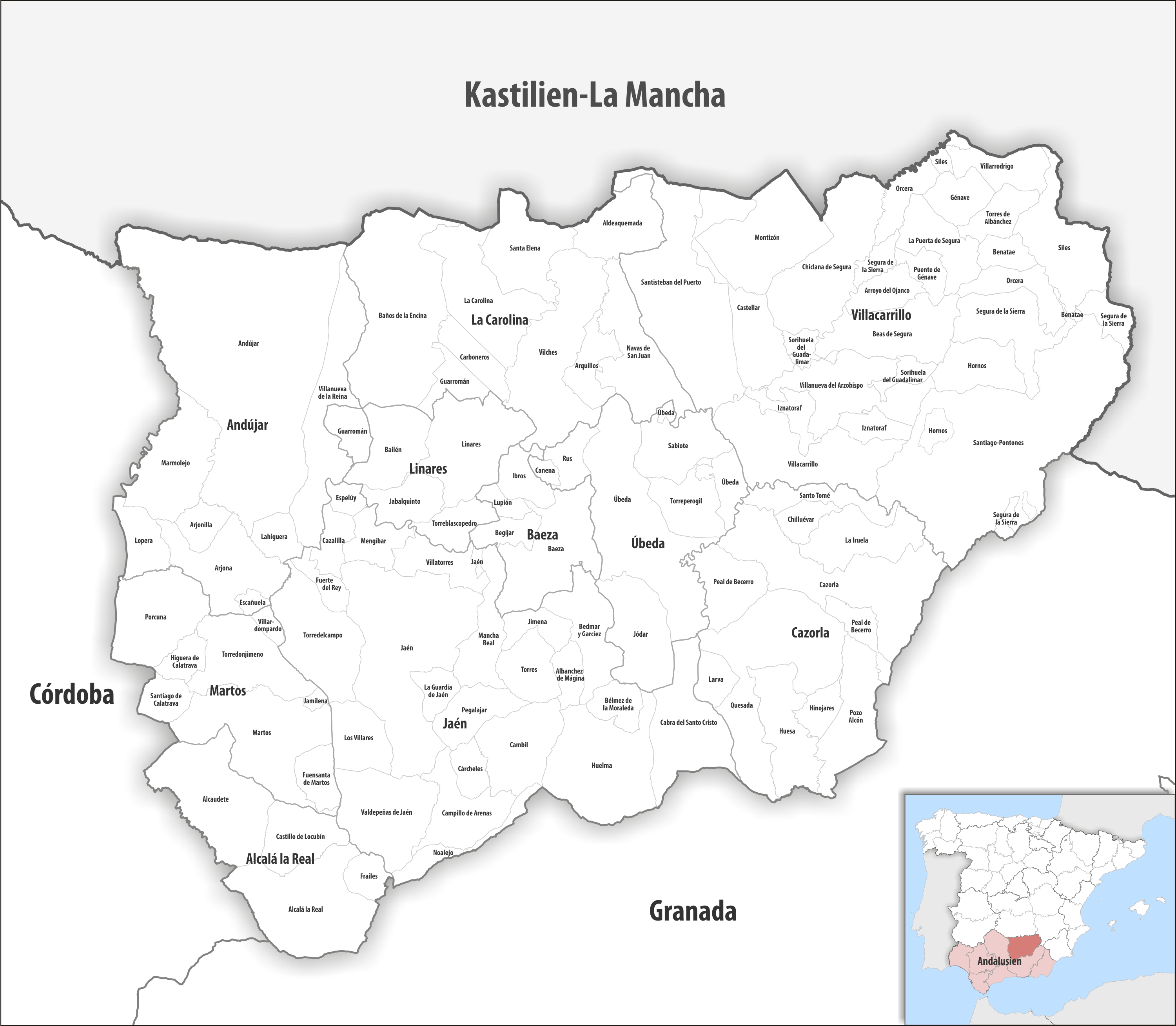
Map of the municipalities in the province of Jaén

Jaén is a province in the autonomous community of Andalusia, Spain. The province is divided into 97 municipalities. As of the 2024 Spanish census, Jaén is the 27th most populous of Spain's 50 provinces, with 619,055 inhabitants, and the 14th largest by land area, spanning 13,486.05 square kilometres (5,206.99 sq mi). Municipalities are the most basic local political division in Spain and can only belong to one province. They enjoy a large degree of autonomy in their local administration, being in charge of tasks such as urban planning, water supply, lighting, roads, local police, and firefighting.

The organisation of municipalities in Spain is outlined by the local government law Ley 7/1985, de 2 de abril, Reguladora de las Bases del Régimen Local (transl. Law 7/1985, of 2 April, Regulating the Bases of the Local Administration), which was passed by the Cortes Generales—Spain’s national parliament—on 2 April 1985 and finalised by royal decree on 18 April 1986. Municipalities in Jaén are also governed by the Statute of Autonomy of Andalusia, which includes provisions concerning their relations with Andalusia's autonomous government. All citizens of Spain are required to register in the municipality in which they reside. Each municipality is a corporation (Note: Within the context of local government in Spain, a corporation is a legal entity representing a municipality. Each municipality is empowered to govern over a specific piece of land and its population.) with independent legal personhood: its governing body is called the ayuntamiento (municipal council or corporation), a term often also used to refer to the municipal offices (city and town halls). The ayuntamiento is composed of the mayor (Spanish: alcalde), the deputy mayors (tenientes de alcalde) and the councillors (concejales), who form the plenary (pleno), the deliberative body. Municipalities are categorised by population for determining the number of councillors: three when the population is up to 100 inhabitants, five for 101–250, seven for 251–1,000, nine for 1,001–2,000, eleven for 2,001–5,000, thirteen for 5,001–10,000, seventeen for 10,001–20,000, twenty-one for 20,001–50,000, and twenty-five for 50,001–100,000. One councillor is added for every additional 100,000 inhabitants, with a further one included if the total would otherwise be even, to avoid tied votes.

The mayor and the deputy mayors are elected by the plenary assembly, which is itself elected by universal suffrage. Elections in municipalities with more than 250 inhabitants are carried out following a proportional representation system with closed lists, whilst those with a population lower than 250 use a block plurality voting system with open lists. The plenary assembly must meet periodically, with meetings occurring more or less frequently depending on the population of the municipality: monthly for those whose population is larger than 20,000, once every two months if it ranges between 5,001 and 20,000, and once every three months if it does not exceed 5,000. Many ayuntamientos also have a local governing board (Spanish: junta de gobierno local), which is appointed by the mayor from amongst the councillors and is required for municipalities of over 5,000 inhabitants. The board, whose role is to assist the mayor between meetings of the plenary assembly, may not include more than one third of the councillors.

The largest municipality by population in the province as of the 2024 Spanish census is Jaén, its capital, with 111,945 residents, while the smallest is Hinojares, with 349 residents. The largest municipality by area is Andújar, which spans 963.60 square kilometres (372.05 sq mi), while Jamilena is the smallest at 8.99 square kilometres (3.47 sq mi).

== Municipalities ==
Largest municipalities in the province of Jaén by population

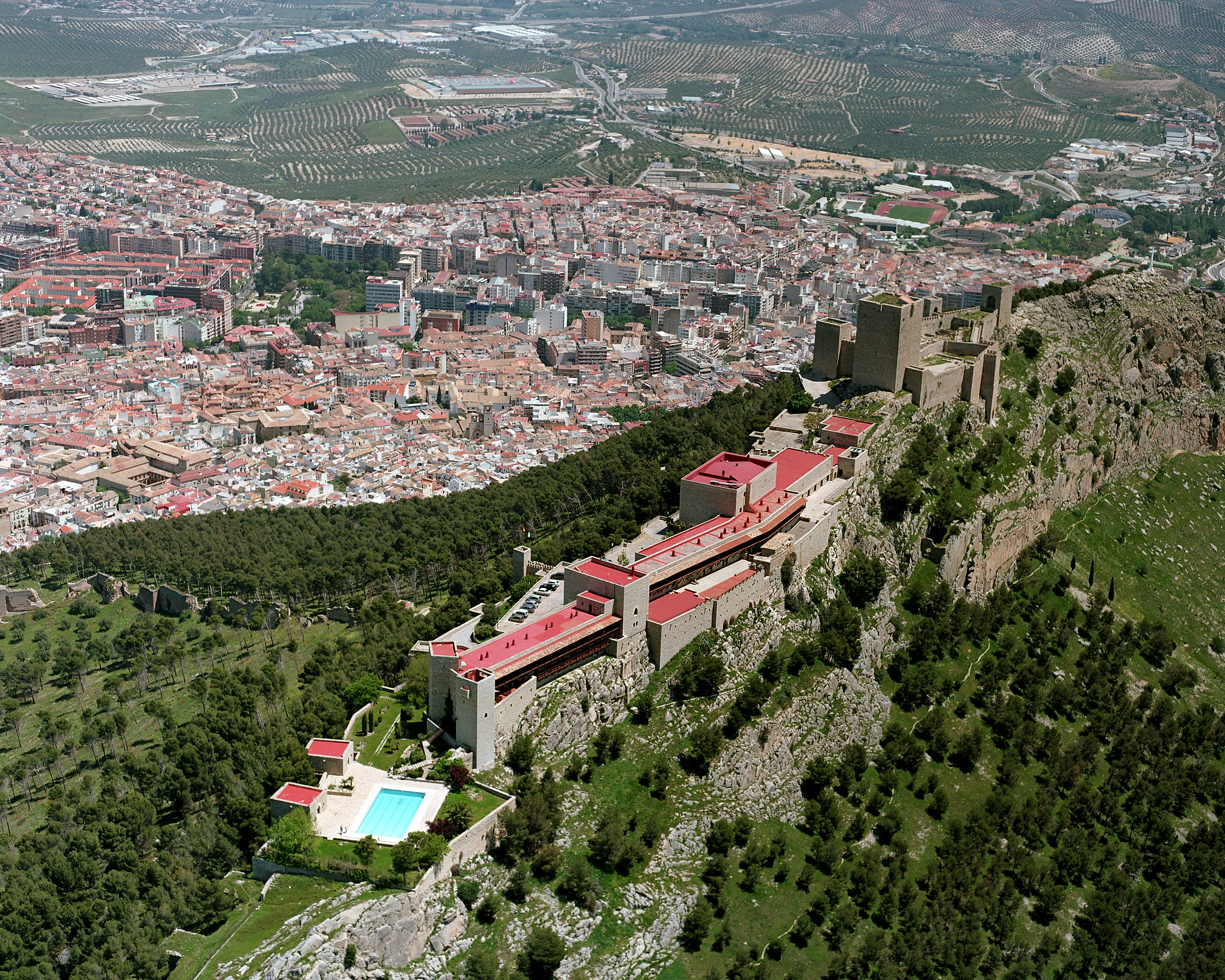
Jaén is the province's capital and largest municipality by population.

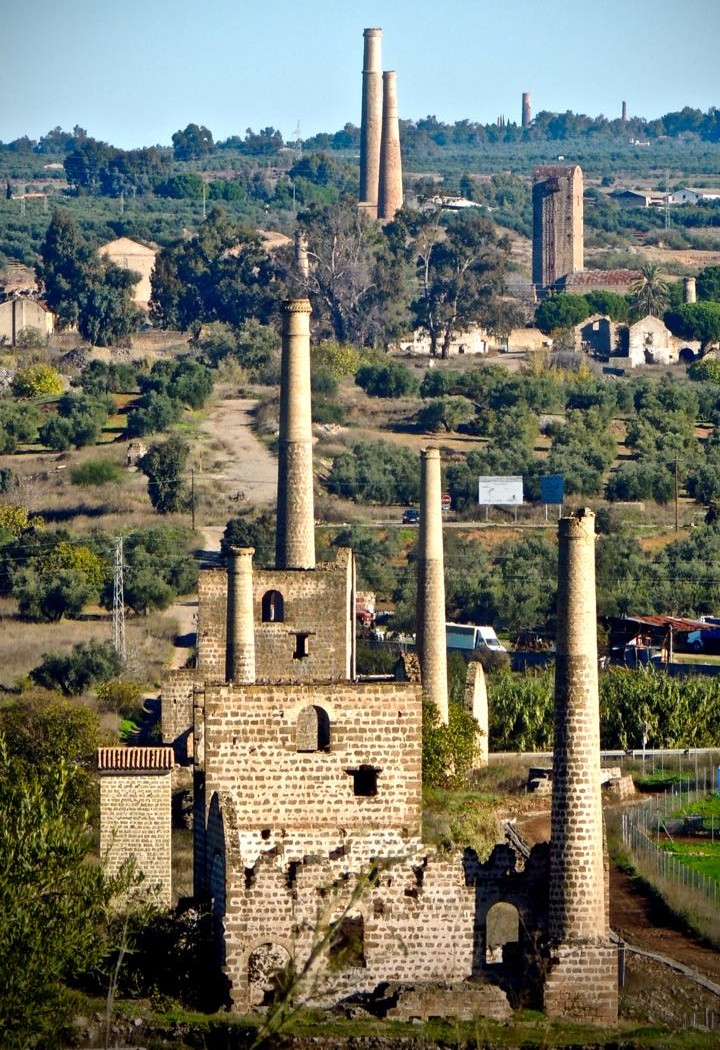
Linares, the second largest municipality by population in the province of Jaén

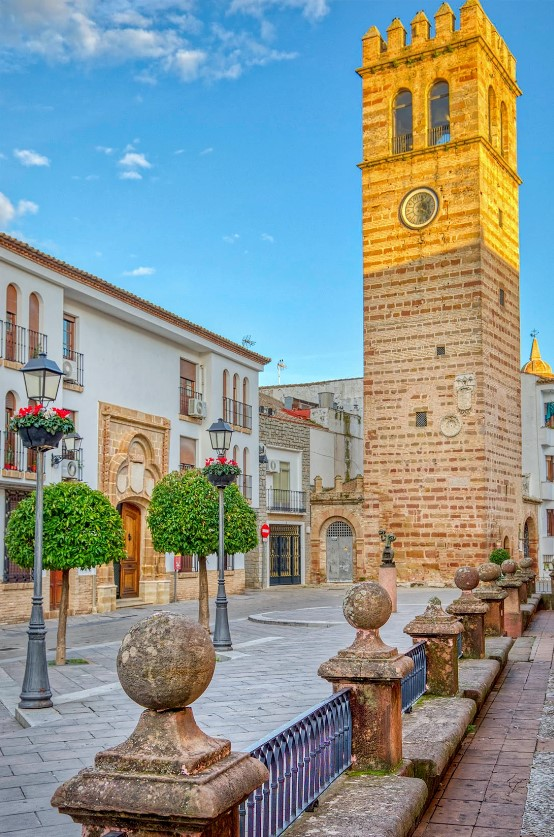
Andújar is the province of Jaén's third largest municipality by population.

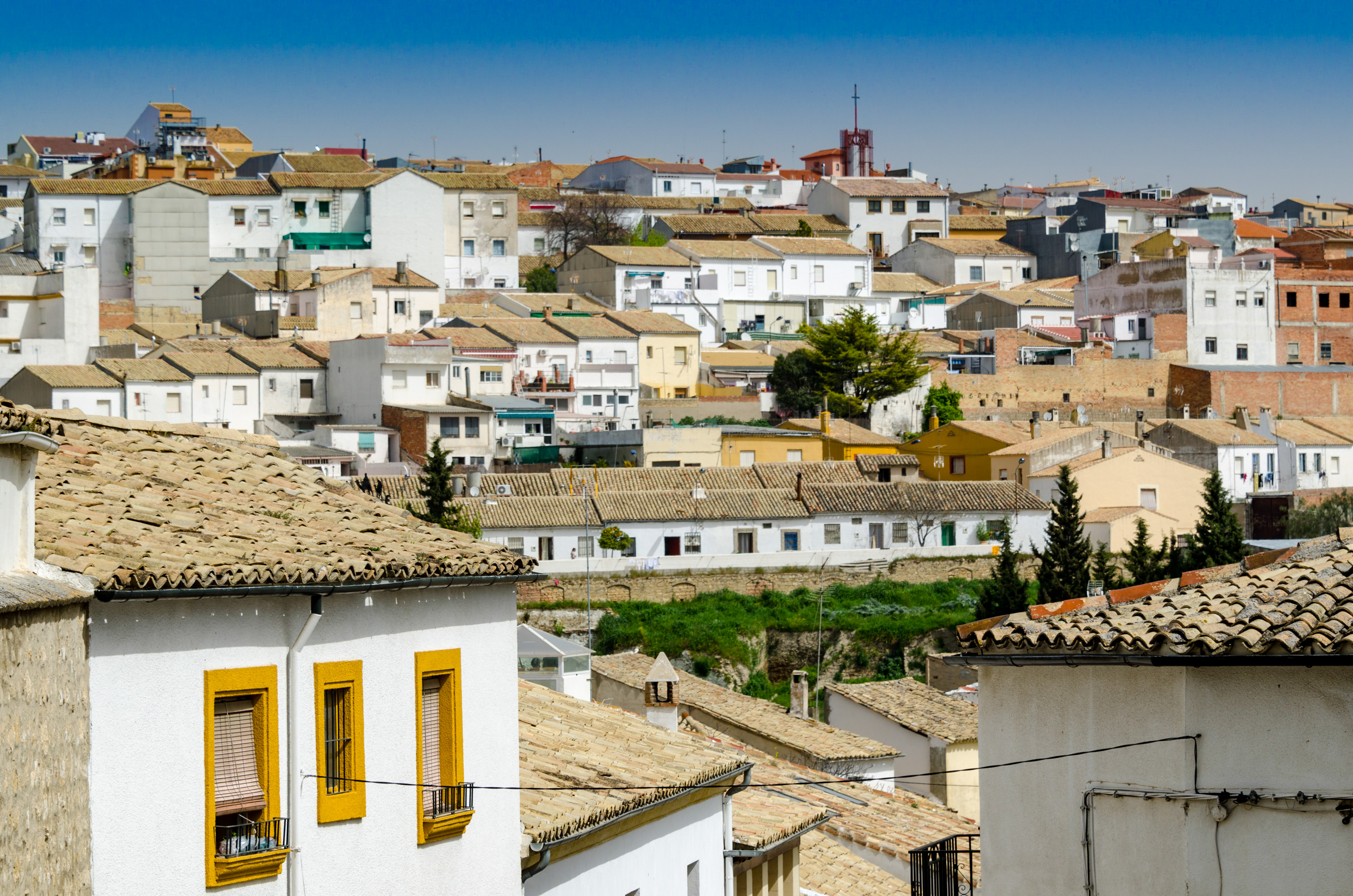
Úbeda, the province of Jaén's fourth largest municipality by population

† Provincial capital

Municipalities in the province of Jaén
Name	Population (2024 census)	Population (2011 census)	Population change	Land area (km²)	Population density (2024)
Albanchez de Mágina	929	1,230	−24.5%	38.83	23.9/km^{2}
Alcalá la Real	21,610	22,722	−4.9%	261.36	82.7/km^{2}
Alcaudete	10,286	11,081	−7.2%	236.84	43.4/km^{2}
Aldeaquemada	453	543	−16.6%	120.28	3.8/km^{2}
Andújar	35,737	38,813	−7.9%	963.60	37.1/km^{2}
Arjona	5,374	5,745	−6.5%	158.45	33.9/km^{2}
Arjonilla	3,530	3,827	−7.8%	42.56	82.9/km^{2}
Arquillos	1,685	1,961	−14.1%	65.98	25.5/km^{2}
Arroyo del Ojanco	2,183	2,492	−12.4%	57.31	38.1/km^{2}
Baeza	15,679	16,446	−4.7%	192.77	81.3/km^{2}
Bailén	17,262	18,695	−7.7%	117.14	147.4/km^{2}
Baños de la Encina	2,565	2,706	−5.2%	392.32	6.5/km^{2}
Beas de Segura	4,974	5,776	−13.9%	159.37	31.2/km^{2}
Bedmar y Garcíez	2,571	3,057	−15.9%	118.80	21.6/km^{2}
Begíjar	2,947	3,130	−5.8%	42.79	68.9/km^{2}
Bélmez de la Moraleda	1,509	1,752	−13.9%	49.44	30.5/km^{2}
Benatae	428	550	−22.2%	44.46	9.6/km^{2}
Cabra del Santo Cristo	1,649	2,027	−18.6%	187.03	8.8/km^{2}
Cambil	2,631	2,888	−8.9%	139.88	18.8/km^{2}
Campillo de Arenas	1,702	2,026	−16.0%	116.59	14.6/km^{2}
Canena	1,754	2,089	−16.0%	14.36	122.1/km^{2}
Carboneros	593	665	−10.8%	58.61	10.1/km^{2}
Cárcheles	1,289	1,492	−13.6%	40.50	31.8/km^{2}
La Carolina	14,709	15,882	−7.4%	201.37	73.0/km^{2}
Castellar	3,154	3,525	−10.5%	157.36	20.0/km^{2}
Castillo de Locubín	3,853	4,626	−16.7%	102.55	37.6/km^{2}
Cazalilla	773	912	−15.2%	46.63	16.6/km^{2}
Cazorla	7,004	7,941	−11.8%	305.40	22.9/km^{2}
Chiclana de Segura	881	1,119	−21.3%	235.91	3.7/km^{2}
Chilluévar	1,321	1,629	−18.9%	38.78	34.1/km^{2}
Escañuela	902	982	−8.1%	13.75	65.6/km^{2}
Espeluy	592	735	−19.5%	25.49	23.2/km^{2}
Frailes	1,551	1,706	−9.1%	40.34	38.4/km^{2}
Fuensanta de Martos	3,014	3,223	−6.5%	54.04	55.8/km^{2}
Fuerte del Rey	1,341	1,397	−4.0%	35.09	38.2/km^{2}
Génave	551	629	−12.4%	63.58	8.7/km^{2}
La Guardia de Jaén	5,244	4,505	+16.4%	38.43	136.5/km^{2}
Guarromán	2,758	2,917	−5.5%	96.21	28.7/km^{2}
Higuera de Calatrava	590	642	−8.1%	38.76	15.2/km^{2}
Hinojares	349	436	−20.0%	40.04	8.7/km^{2}
Hornos	579	679	−14.7%	117.58	4.9/km^{2}
Huelma	5,521	6,152	−10.3%	250.29	22.1/km^{2}
Huesa	2,417	2,652	−8.9%	138.43	17.5/km^{2}
Ibros	2,767	3,050	−9.3%	56.00	49.4/km^{2}
La Iruela	1,861	2,094	−11.1%	123.97	15.0/km^{2}
Iznatoraf	880	1,079	−18.4%	86.54	10.2/km^{2}
Jabalquinto	1,964	2,332	−15.8%	73.24	26.8/km^{2}
Jaén†	111,945	116,469	−3.9%	424.23	263.9/km^{2}
Jamilena	3,300	3,478	−5.1%	8.99	367.1/km^{2}
Jimena	1,240	1,401	−11.5%	48.04	25.8/km^{2}
Jódar	11,362	12,090	−6.0%	148.78	76.4/km^{2}
Lahiguera	1,589	1,854	−14.3%	44.75	35.5/km^{2}
Larva	440	489	−10.0%	41.76	10.5/km^{2}
Linares	55,303	60,799	−9.0%	196.70	281.2/km^{2}
Lopera	3,539	3,886	−8.9%	67.91	52.1/km^{2}
Lupión	804	961	−16.3%	24.33	33.0/km^{2}
Mancha Real	11,382	11,254	+1.1%	97.70	116.5/km^{2}
Marmolejo	6,521	7,346	−11.2%	178.12	36.6/km^{2}
Martos	24,423	24,457	−0.1%	261.10	93.5/km^{2}
Mengíbar	10,035	9,826	+2.1%	62.34	161.0/km^{2}
Montizón	1,525	1,891	−19.4%	211.98	7.2/km^{2}
Navas de San Juan	4,419	4,959	−10.9%	175.91	25.1/km^{2}
Noalejo	1,795	2,077	−13.6%	49.96	35.9/km^{2}
Orcera	1,715	1,987	−13.7%	126.30	13.6/km^{2}
Peal de Becerro	5,272	5,550	−5.0%	147.36	35.8/km^{2}
Pegalajar	2,832	3,081	−8.1%	79.95	35.4/km^{2}
Porcuna	5,900	6,798	−13.2%	175.57	33.6/km^{2}
Pozo Alcón	4,583	5,245	−12.6%	138.61	33.1/km^{2}
Puente de Génave	2,180	2,279	−4.3%	38.84	56.1/km^{2}
La Puerta de Segura	2,245	2,617	−14.2%	97.45	23.0/km^{2}
Quesada	4,950	5,875	−15.7%	328.35	15.1/km^{2}
Rus	3,412	3,775	−9.6%	46.89	72.8/km^{2}
Sabiote	3,780	4,207	−10.1%	111.94	33.8/km^{2}
Santa Elena	868	982	−11.6%	145.48	6.0/km^{2}
Santiago-Pontones	2,700	3,572	−24.4%	682.34	4.0/km^{2}
Santiago de Calatrava	672	819	−17.9%	47.54	14.1/km^{2}
Santisteban del Puerto	4,455	4,779	−6.8%	372.89	11.9/km^{2}
Santo Tomé	2,071	2,532	−18.2%	73.48	28.2/km^{2}
Segura de la Sierra	1,685	1,948	−13.5%	224.87	7.5/km^{2}
Siles	2,108	2,418	−12.8%	176.12	12.0/km^{2}
Sorihuela del Guadalimar	1,036	1,324	−21.8%	55.31	18.7/km^{2}
Torreblascopedro	2,404	2,799	−14.1%	61.43	39.1/km^{2}
Torredelcampo	13,937	14,654	−4.9%	182.16	76.5/km^{2}
Torredonjimeno	13,258	14,107	−6.0%	157.78	84.0/km^{2}
Torreperogil	7,115	7,673	−7.3%	90.94	78.2/km^{2}
Torres	1,348	1,620	−16.8%	80.04	16.8/km^{2}
Torres de Albánchez	743	949	−21.7%	57.89	12.8/km^{2}
Úbeda	33,665	35,622	−5.5%	403.92	83.3/km^{2}
Valdepeñas de Jaén	3,554	4,091	−13.1%	183.79	19.3/km^{2}
Vilches	4,213	4,822	−12.6%	273.38	15.4/km^{2}
Villacarrillo	10,329	11,311	−8.7%	239.55	43.1/km^{2}
Villanueva de la Reina	2,965	3,361	−11.8%	209.26	14.2/km^{2}
Villanueva del Arzobispo	7,779	8,909	−12.7%	177.81	43.7/km^{2}
Villardompardo	924	1,094	−15.5%	17.47	52.9/km^{2}
Los Villares	6,083	5,935	+2.5%	88.61	68.6/km^{2}
Villarrodrigo	394	455	−13.4%	78.39	5.0/km^{2}
Villatorres	4,272	4,498	−5.0%	72.68	58.8/km^{2}
Province of Jaén	619,055	667,484	−7.3%	13,486.05	45.9/km^{2}
Andalusia	8,631,862	8,371,270	+3.1%	87,587.59	98.6/km^{2}
Spain	48,619,695	46,815,916	+3.9%	504,755.17	96.3/km^{2}

== See also ==
- Geography of Spain
- List of municipalities of Spain
