= Orcera =

- Municipality
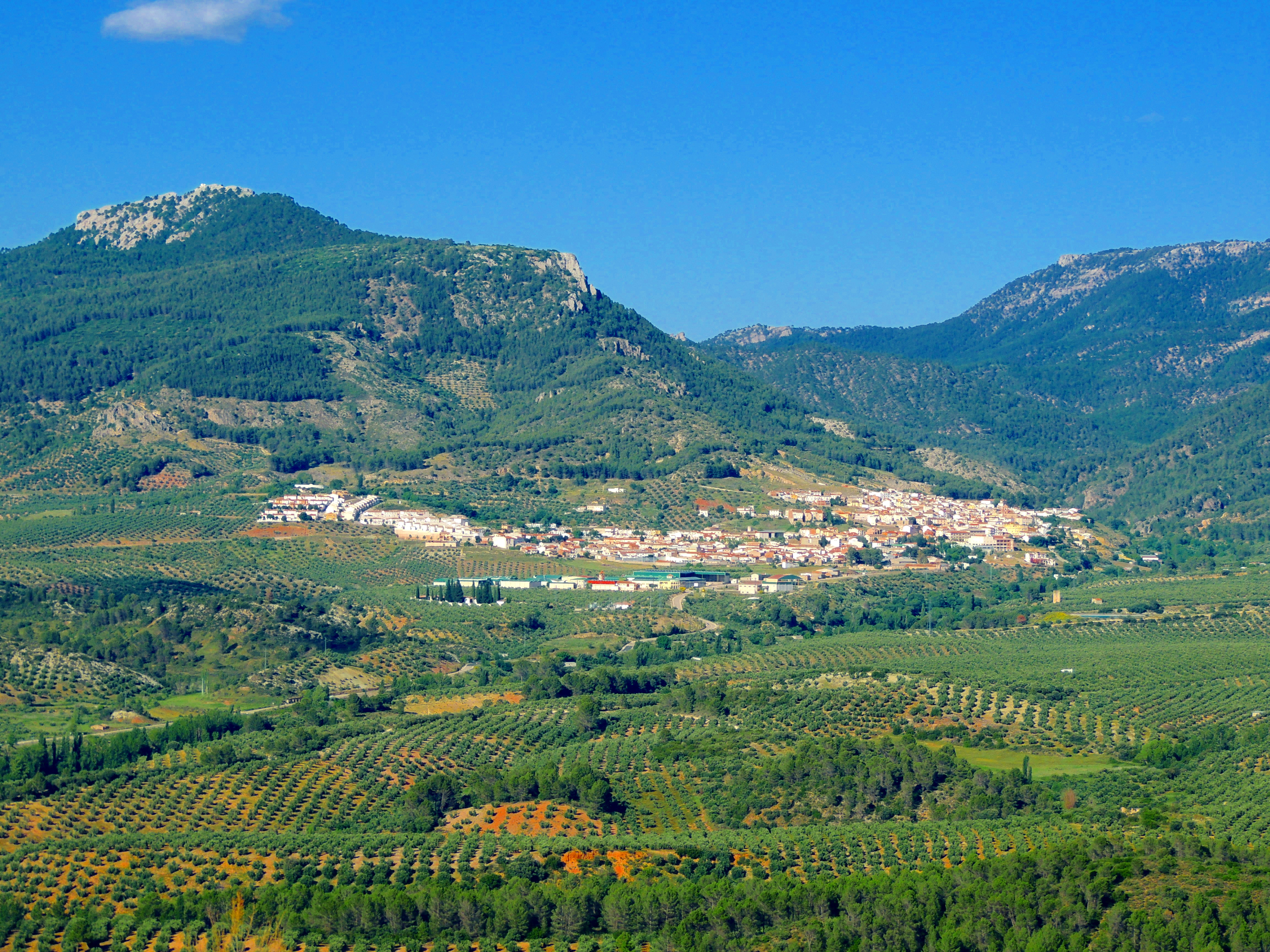
- View of Orcera

- Coat of arms

- Location within Spain
- Coordinates: 38°19′04.0″N 2°39′33.6″W
- Country: Spain
- Community: Andalusia
- Province: Jaén

Government
  - Mayor: Juan Francisco Fernández

Area
  - Total: 126.2 km^{2} (48.7 sq mi)

Population (January 1, 2021)
  - Total: 1,758
  - Density: 13.93/km^{2} (36.1/sq mi)
- Time zone: UTC+01:00 (CET)
- Postal code: 23370
- Area code: 23065
- Website: Official website

Orcera is a city located in the province of Jaén, Spain. According to the 2005 census (INE), the city has a population of 2117 inhabitants.

== See also ==
- List of municipalities in Jaén
