= Escañuela =

- village
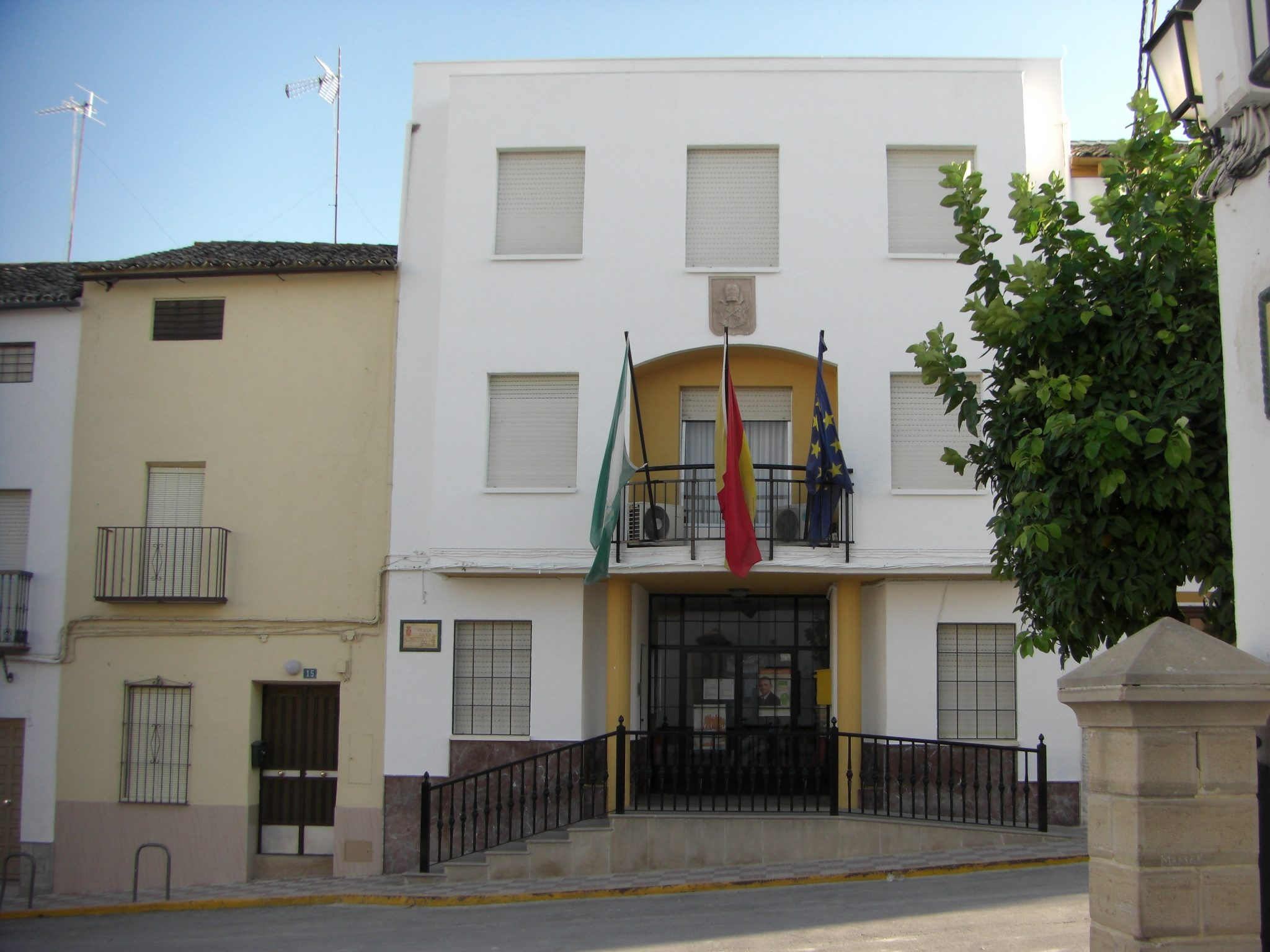
- Town hall

- Coat of arms

- Location in the Province of Jaén Escañuela (Andalusia) Escañuela (Spain)
- Coordinates: 37°52′N 4°2′W
- Country: Spain
- Autonomous community: Andalusia
- Province: Jaén
- Comarca: Campiña

Government
  - Mayor: Ana María Fernández Extremera (PSOE)

Area
  - Total: 13 km^{2} (5.0 sq mi)
- Elevation: 316 m (1,037 ft)

Population (2025-01-01)
  - Total: 902
  - Density: 69/km^{2} (180/sq mi)
- Demonym: Escañoleros
- Time zone: UTC+1 (CET)
  - Summer (DST): UTC+2 (CEST)

Escañuela is a village (pueblo) located in the province of Jaén, Spain. According to the 2024 (INE) figures, the city had a population of 902 inhabitants.

The village's traditional economy is based on the production of olives - these are mainly pressed for oil. However many of the younger population work in the nearby city of Jaen.

The patron saint, to whom the church is dedicated, is San Pedro ad vincula (St Peter in chains) after which the annual fiesta in the first week of August is named. The Fiesta is an occasion of much celebration as many of the children of the village return from far away to join with their families and friends.

== See also ==
- List of municipalities in Jaén
