= Torres de Albanchez =

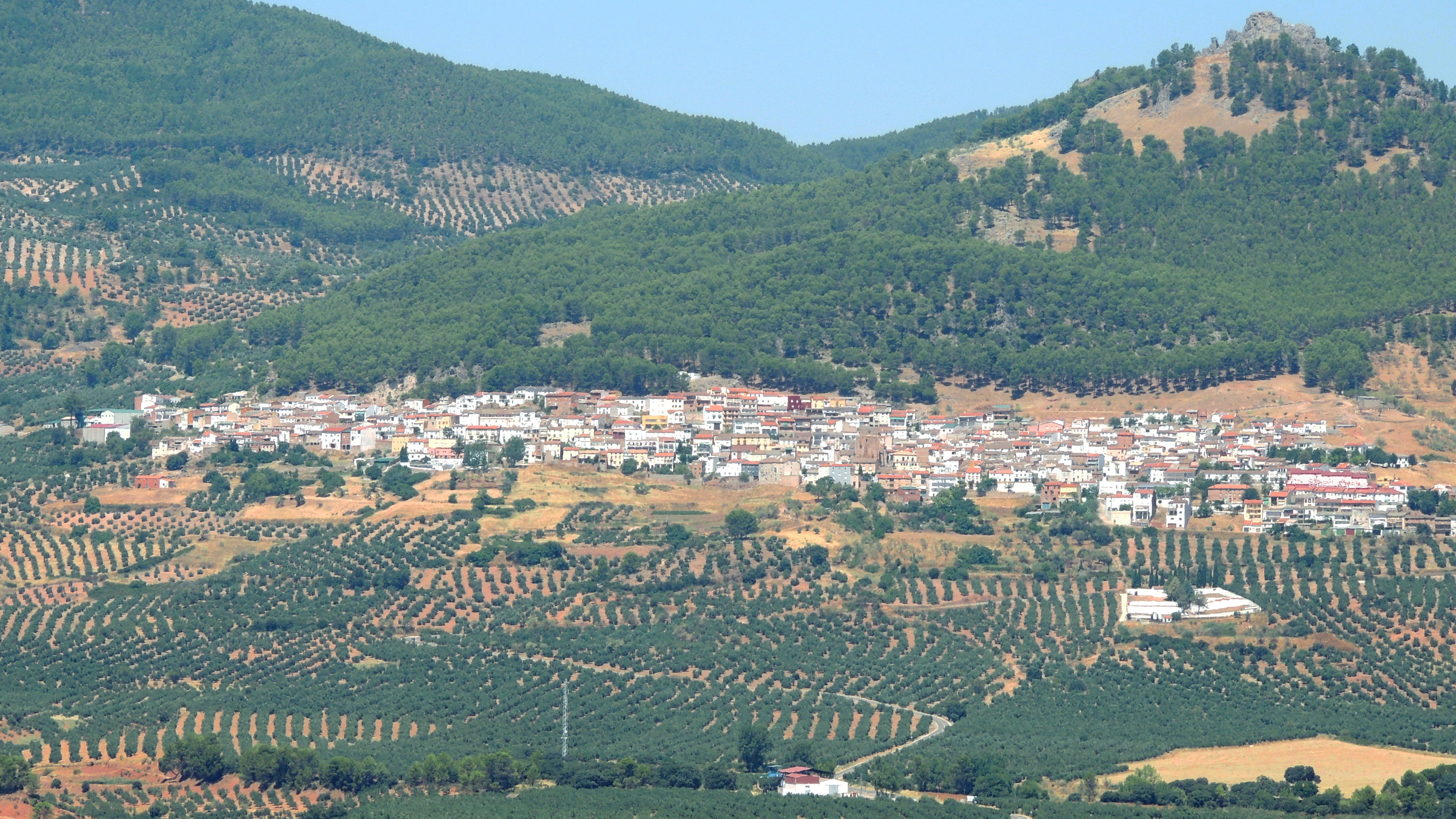

- Coat of arms

- Location in the Province of Jaén Torres de Albanchez (Andalusia) Torres de Albanchez (Spain)
- Coordinates: 38°25′N 2°40′W
- Comarca: Sierra de Segura

Government
  - Mayor: Nicolás Grimaldos García

Area
  - Total: 65 km^{2} (25 sq mi)
- Elevation: 1,001 m (3,284 ft)

Population (2025-01-01)
  - Total: 735
  - Density: 11/km^{2} (29/sq mi)
- Demonym: Torreños
- Time zone: UTC+1 (CET)
  - Summer (DST): UTC+2 (CEST)

Torres de Albanchez is a village located in the province of Jaén, southern Spain.

== See also ==
- List of municipalities in Jaén
