= Fuensanta de Martos =

- city
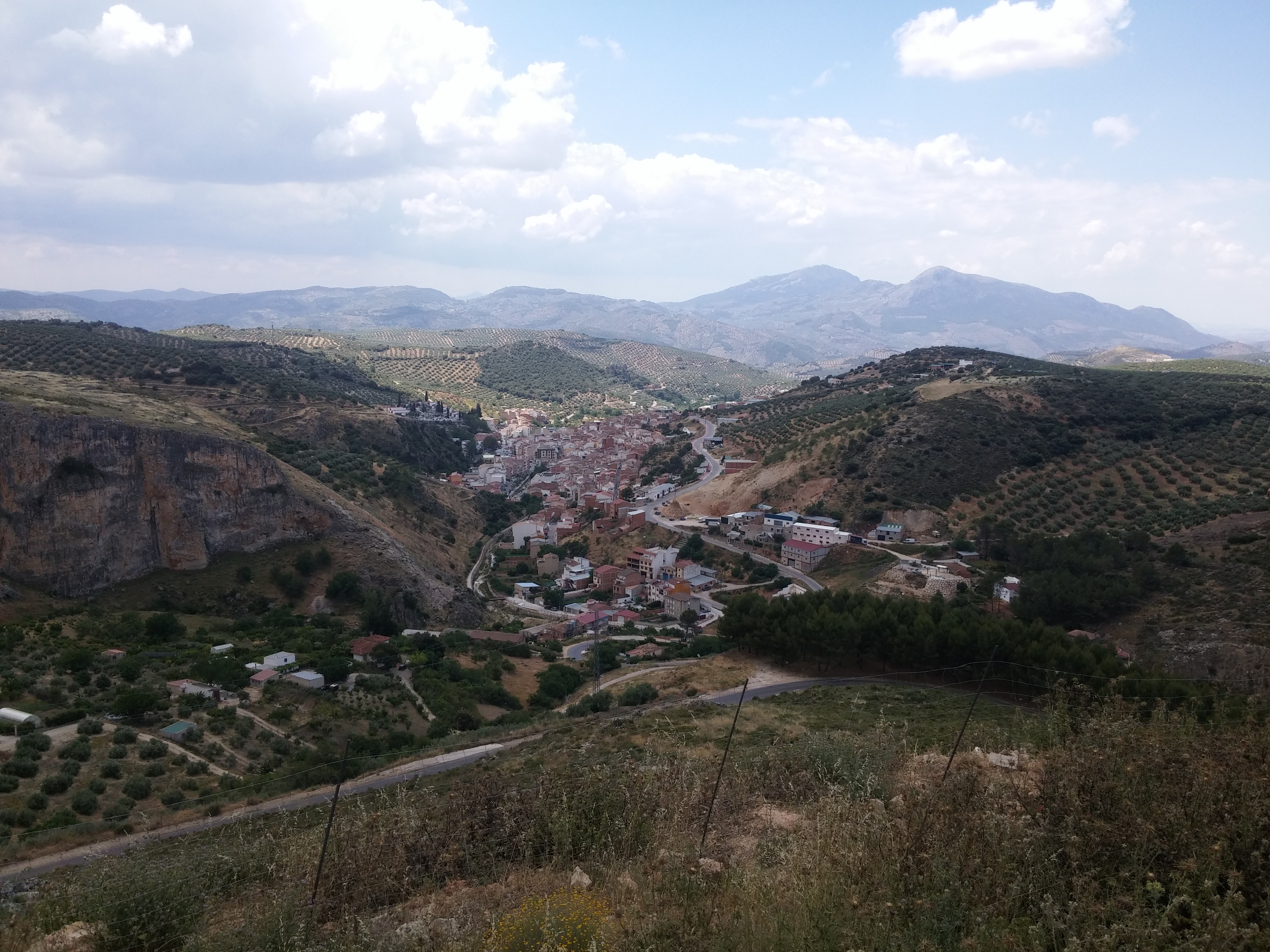

- Coat of arms

- Location in the Province of Jaén Fuensanta de Martos (Andalusia) Fuensanta de Martos (Spain)
- Coordinates: 37°39′N 3°54′W
- Country: Spain
- Autonomous community: Andalusia
- Province: Jaén
- Municipality: Fuensanta de Martos

Area
  - Total: 53 km^{2} (20 sq mi)
- Elevation: 725 m (2,379 ft)

Population (2025-01-01)
  - Total: 3,030
  - Density: 57/km^{2} (150/sq mi)
- Time zone: UTC+1 (CET)
  - Summer (DST): UTC+2 (CEST)

Fuensanta de Martos is a city located in the province of Jaén, Spain. According to the 2024 INE figures, the town had a population of 2990 inhabitants.

== See also ==
- List of municipalities in Jaén
