= Benatae =

- Municipality
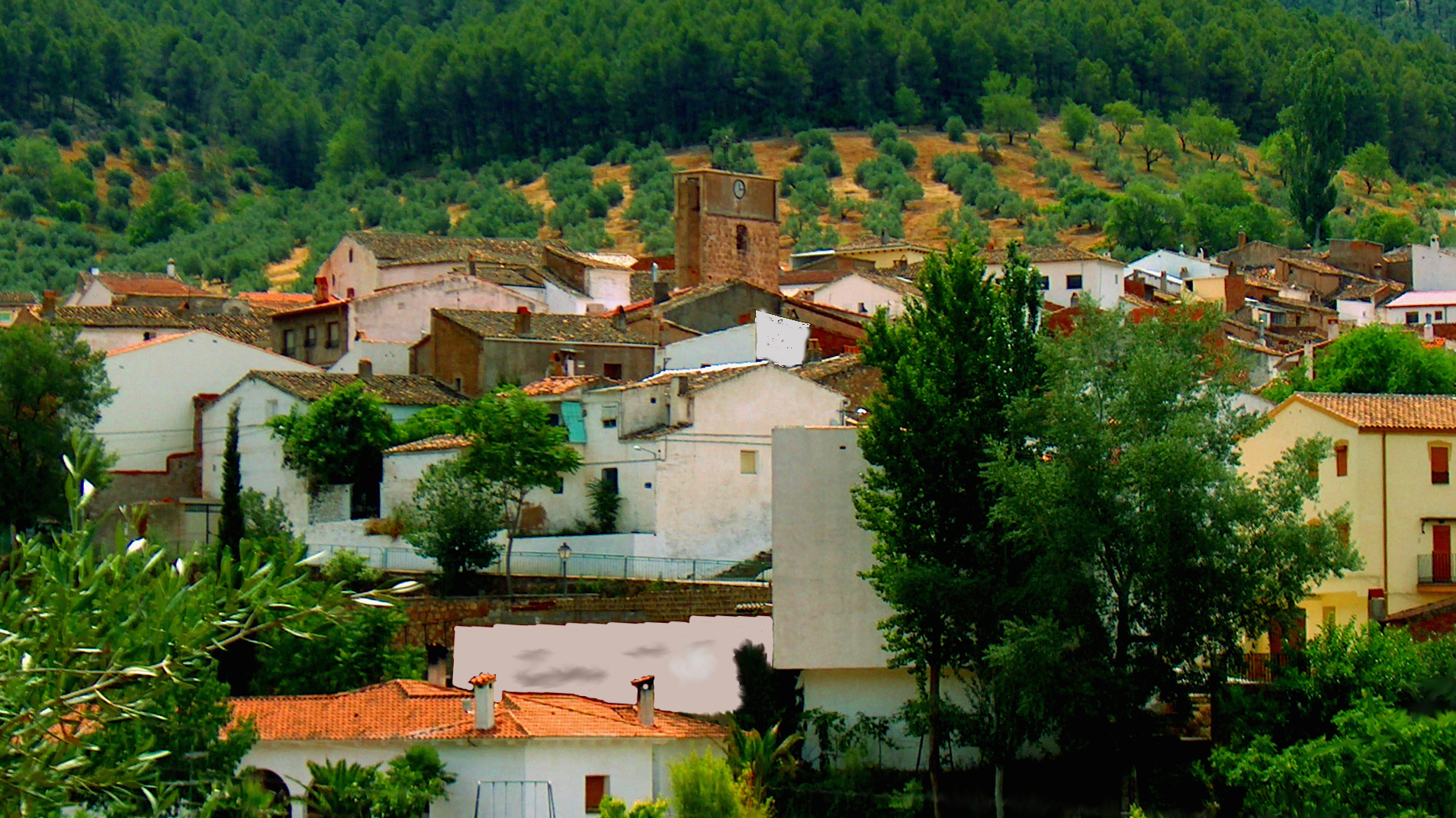
- Benatae

- Flag Coat of arms

- Location within Spain
- Coordinates: 38°21′09.9″N 2°39′02.2″W
- Country: Spain
- Community: Andalusia
- Province: Jaén

Government
  - Mayor: José Pascual Bermúdez

Area
  - Total: 44.46 km^{2} (17.17 sq mi)

Population (January 1, 2021)
  - Total: 442
  - Density: 9.942/km^{2} (25.75/sq mi)
- Time zone: UTC+01:00 (CET)
- Postal code: 23390
- Area code: 23016
- Website: Official website

Benatae is a Municipality located in the province of Jaén, Spain. According to 2024 INE figures, the village had a population of 429 inhabitants.

== See also ==
- List of municipalities in Jaén
