= Lahiguera =

Lahiguera, Spain
- city
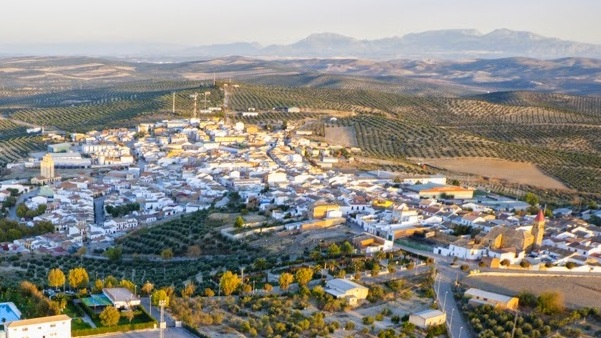

- Flag Coat of arms

- Location in the Province of Jaén Lahiguera (Andalusia) Lahiguera (Spain)
- Coordinates: 37°58′0″N 3°59′0″W
- Country: Spain
- Autonomous community: Andalusia
- Province: Jaén
- Municipality: Lahiguera

Area
  - Total: 44 km^{2} (17 sq mi)
- Elevation: 220 m (720 ft)

Population (2025-01-01)
  - Total: 1,560
  - Density: 35/km^{2} (92/sq mi)
- Time zone: UTC+1 (CET)
  - Summer (DST): UTC+2 (CEST)

La higuera is a Spanish town and municipality located in the southern part of the region of La Campiña Jienense, in the province of Jaén, autonomous community of Andalusia. It borders the municipalities of Villanueva de la Reina, Andújar, Arjona, Torredelcampo and Fuerte del Rey. The River Salado de Arjona flows through the municipality.

The municipality of Higuerense includes the population centre of Lahiguera - the municipal capital - and the outlying areas of Bobadilla, Cajeros, El Caño, Donadío Alto, Manolico Encinas, La Paz, La Presa, Perales, San José and Silvente.

In 2021 it had 1638 inhabitants (INE). Until 1995 this locality was called Higuera de Arjona.

== See also ==
- List of municipalities in Jaén
