= Castellar, Jaén =

Castellar
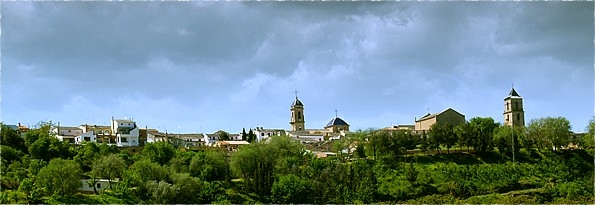
- View of Castellar

- Flag Coat of arms

- Location in the Province of Jaén Castellar, Jaén (Andalusia) Castellar, Jaén (Spain)
- Coordinates: 38°15′06″N 3°07′53″W
- Country: Spain
- Autonomous community: Andalusia
- Province: Jaén

Area
  - Total: 155.48 km^{2} (60.03 sq mi)
- Elevation: 760 m (2,490 ft)

Population (2025-01-01)
  - Total: 3,147
  - Density: 20.24/km^{2} (52.42/sq mi)
- Time zone: UTC+1 (CET)
  - Summer (DST): UTC+2 (CEST)
- Website: http://www.castellar.es/

Castellar (formerly known Castellar de Santiesteban) is a municipality in the province of Jaén, in the autonomous community of Andalusia, Spain.

== See also ==
- List of municipalities in Jaén
