= Espeluy =

Espeluy, Spain
- town
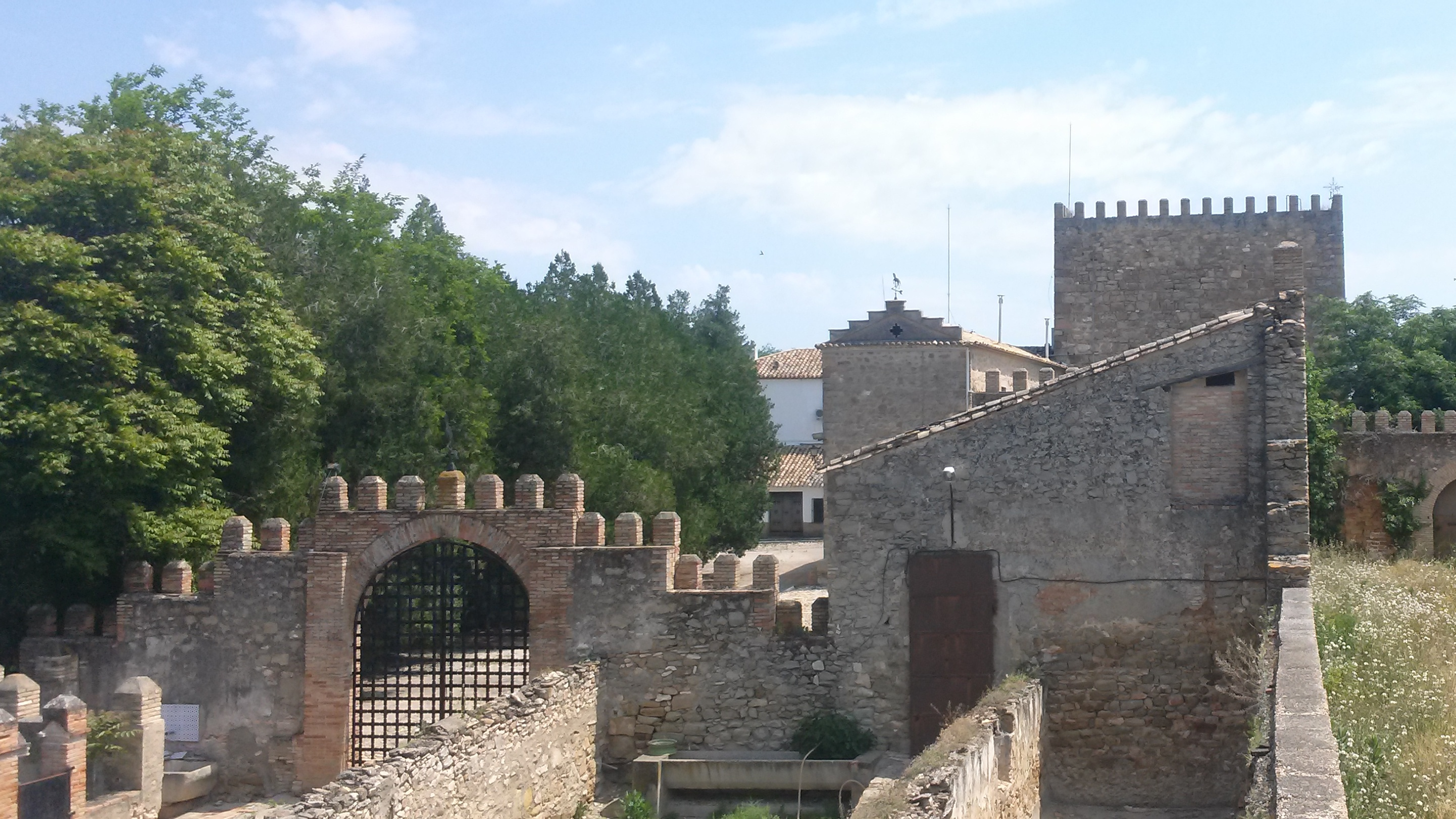

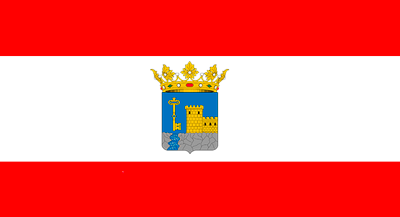
- Flag Coat of arms

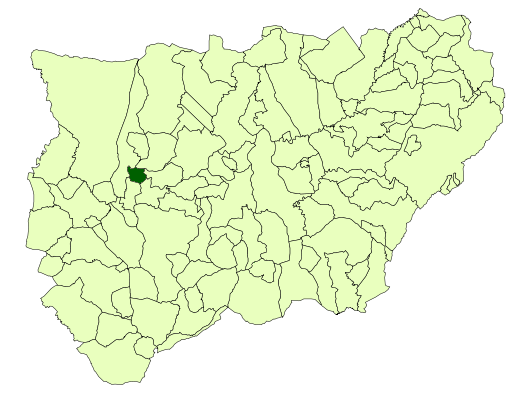
- Location of Espeluy

- Location in the Province of Jaén Espeluy (Andalusia) Espeluy (Spain)
- Coordinates: 38°02′N 3°51′W
- Country: Spain
- Autonomous community: Andalusia
- Province: Jaén
- Municipality: Espeluy

Area
  - Total: 25 km^{2} (9.7 sq mi)
- Elevation: 282 m (925 ft)

Population (2025-01-01)
  - Total: 596
  - Density: 24/km^{2} (62/sq mi)
- Time zone: UTC+1 (CET)
  - Summer (DST): UTC+2 (CEST)
- Website: www.espeluy.es

Espeluy is a town located in the province of Jaén, Spain. The town was reorganized and repopulated by the Instituto Nacional de Colonización in the 1950s. According to the 2024 INE figures, the city had a population of 591 inhabitants.

== See also ==
- List of municipalities in Jaén
