= Jamilena =

Jamilena, Spain
- city
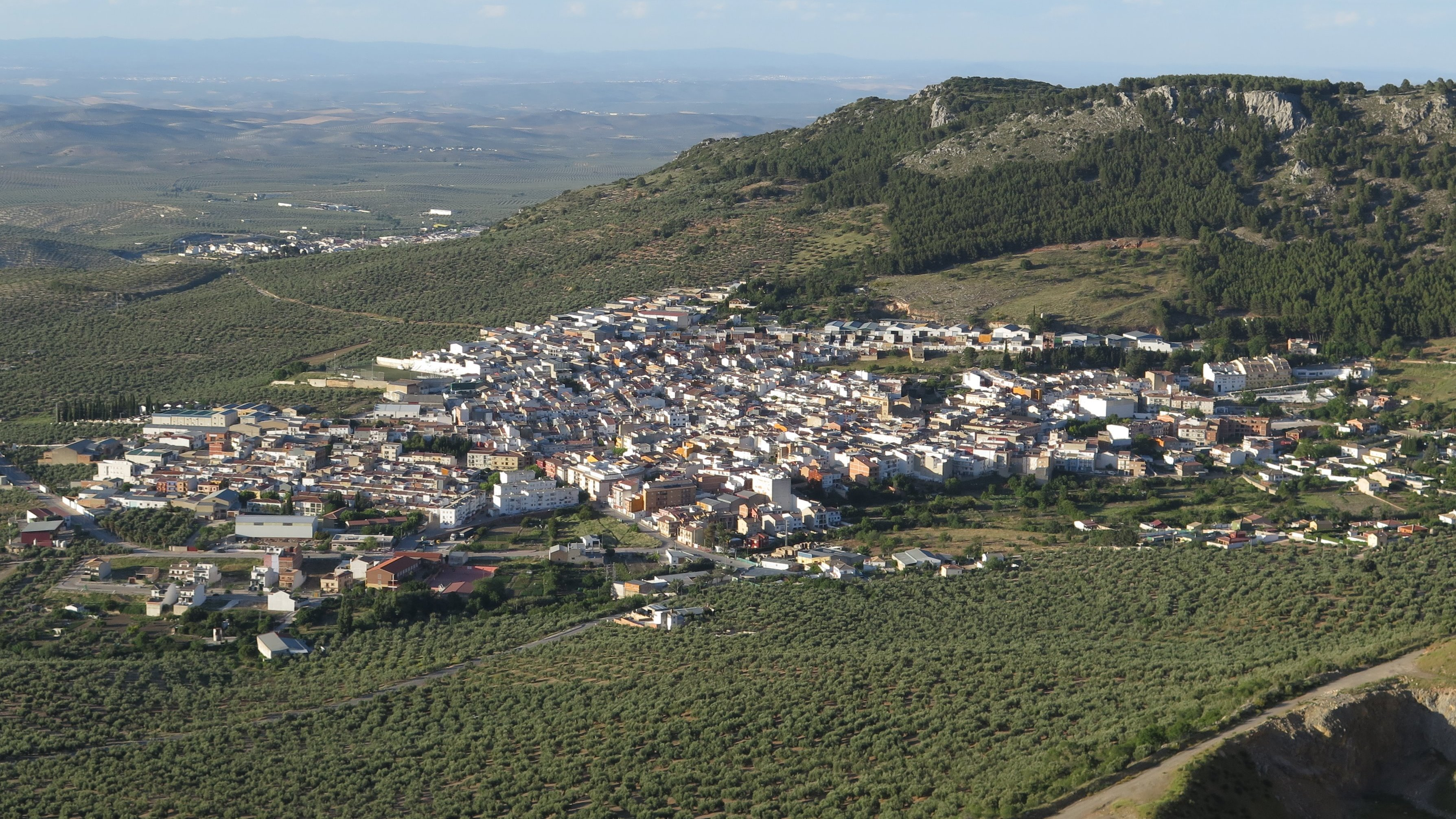

- Flag Coat of arms

- Location in the Province of Jaén Jamilena (Andalusia) Jamilena (Spain)
- Coordinates: 37°45′N 3°54′W
- Country: Spain
- Autonomous community: Andalusia
- Province: Jaén
- Municipality: Jamilena

Area
  - Total: 8.99 km^{2} (3.47 sq mi)
- Elevation: 765 m (2,510 ft)

Population (2025-01-01)
  - Total: 3,319
  - Density: 369/km^{2} (956/sq mi)
- Time zone: UTC+1 (CET)
  - Summer (DST): UTC+2 (CEST)

Jamilena is a city located in the province of Jaén, Spain. According to the 2005 census (INE), the city had a population of 3429 inhabitants.

== See also ==
- List of municipalities in Jaén
