= Noalejo =

Noalejo, Spain
- city
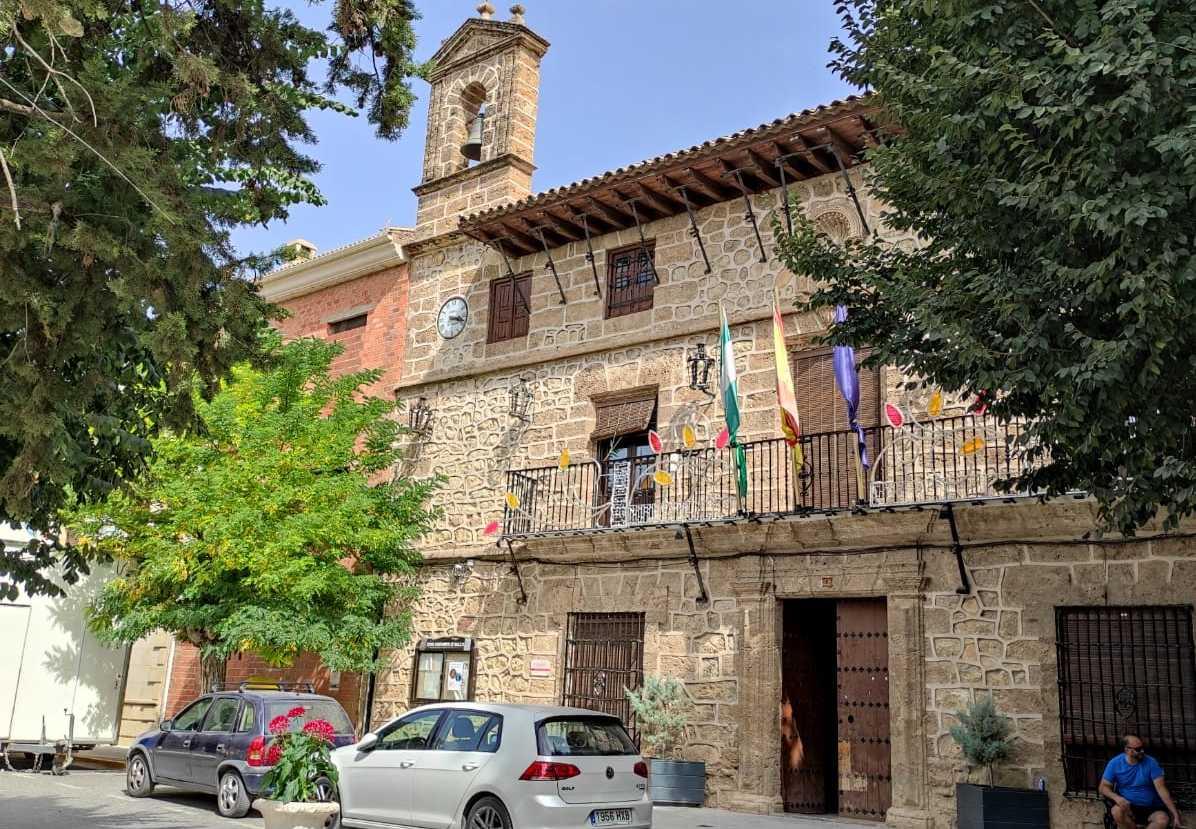

- Flag Coat of arms

- Location in the Province of Jaén Noalejo (Andalusia) Noalejo (Spain)
- Coordinates: 37°31′N 3°39′W
- Country: Spain
- Autonomous community: Andalusia
- Province: Jaén
- Municipality: Noalejo

Area
  - Total: 50 km^{2} (19 sq mi)
- Elevation: 1,070 m (3,510 ft)

Population (2025-01-01)
  - Total: 1,721
  - Density: 34/km^{2} (89/sq mi)
- Time zone: UTC+1 (CET)
  - Summer (DST): UTC+2 (CEST)

Noalejo is a city located in the province of Jaén, Spain. According to the 2005 census (INE), the city has a population of 2155 inhabitants.

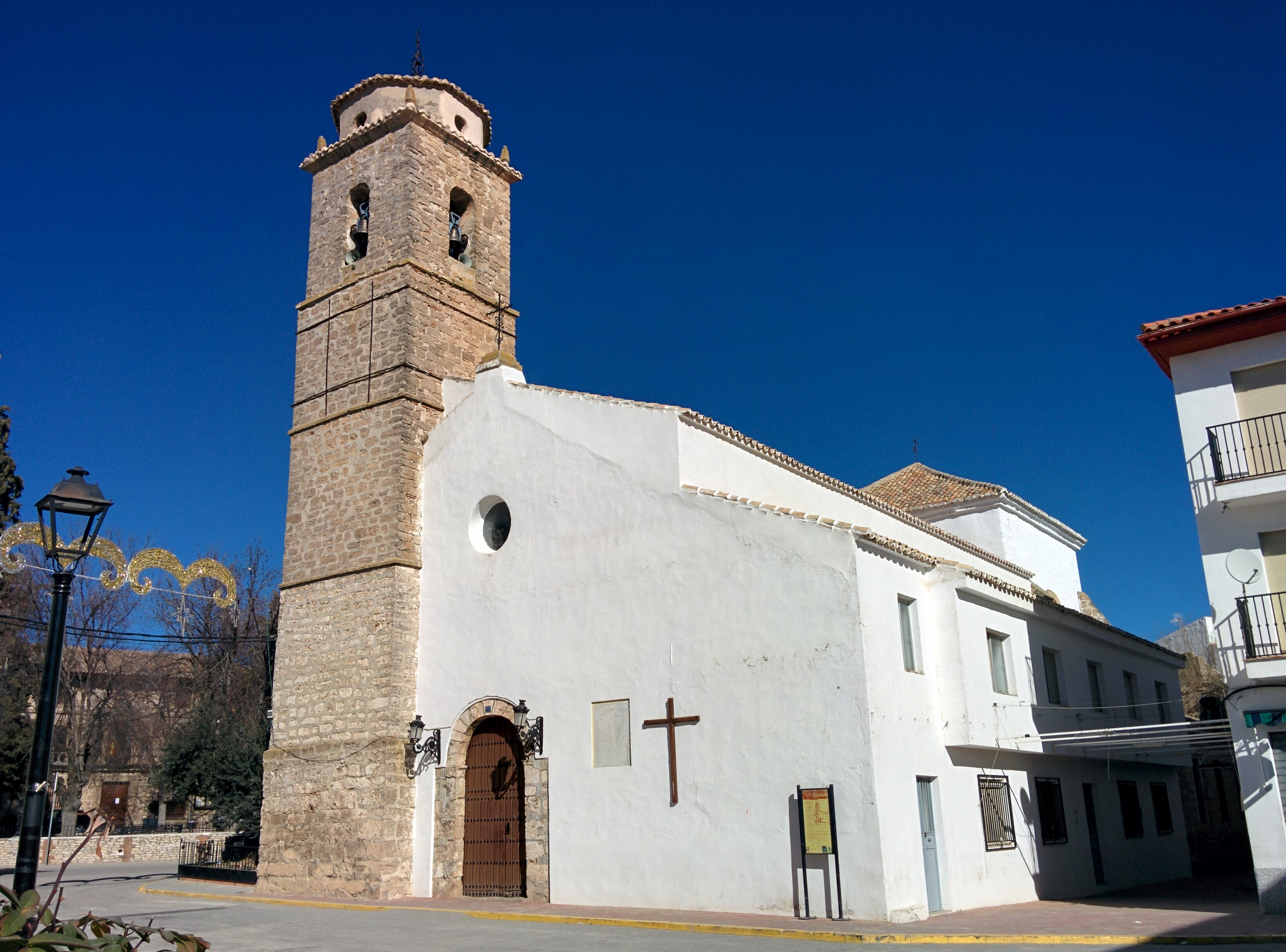
Church of the Assumption in Noalejo, Jaén, Spain

== See also ==
- List of municipalities in Jaén
