= Cárcheles =

Cárcheles, Spain
- city
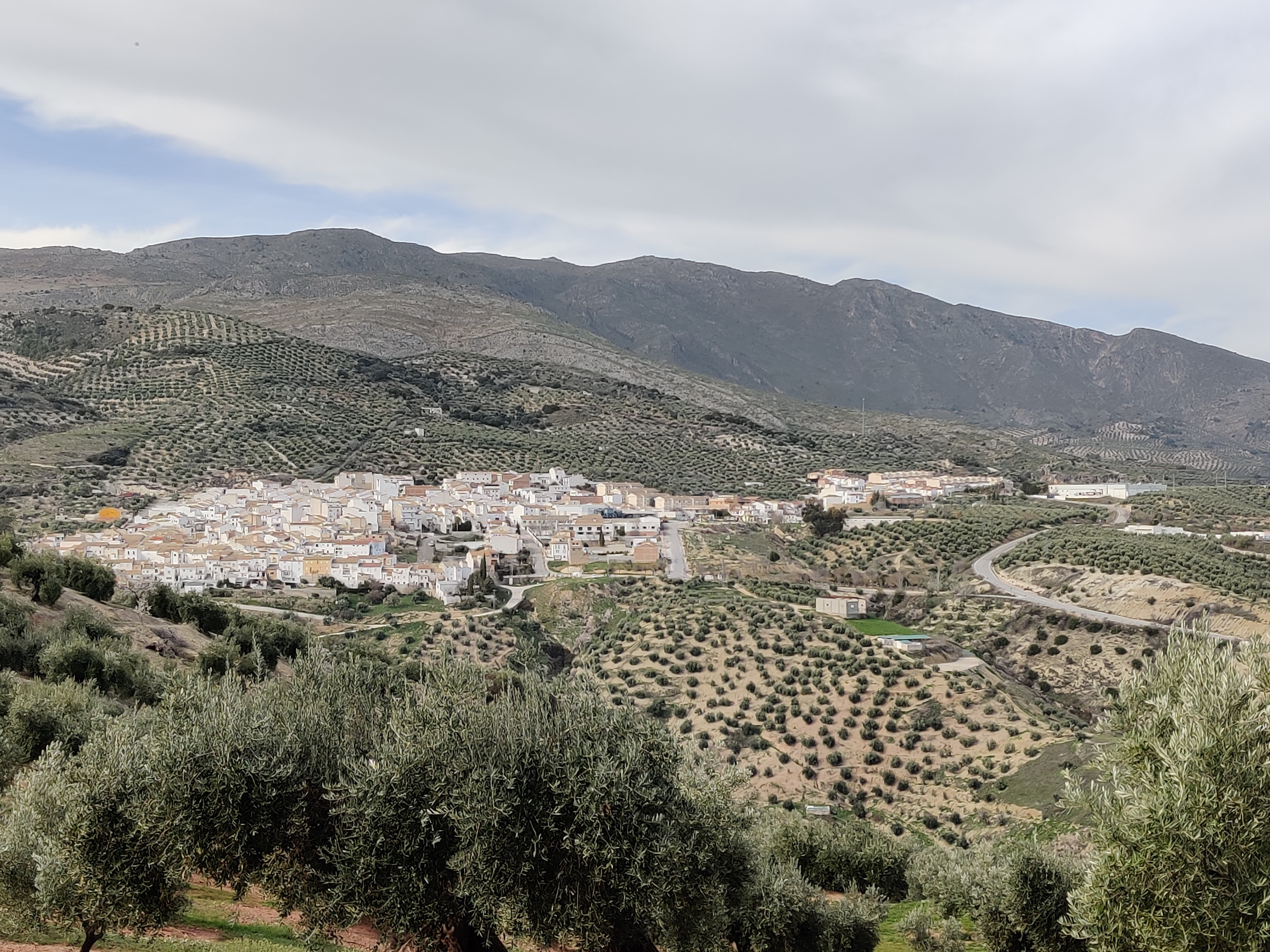

- Flag Coat of arms

- Location in the Province of Jaén Cárcheles (Andalusia) Cárcheles (Spain)
- Coordinates: 37°38′0″N 3°38′0″W
- Country: Spain
- Autonomous community: Andalusia
- Province: Jaén
- Municipality: Cárcheles

Area
  - Total: 43 km^{2} (17 sq mi)
- Elevation: 825 m (2,707 ft)

Population (2025-01-01)
  - Total: 1,291
  - Density: 30/km^{2} (78/sq mi)
- Time zone: UTC+1 (CET)
  - Summer (DST): UTC+2 (CEST)

Cárcheles is a town located in the province of Jaén, Spain. According to 2024 INE figures, the town had a population of 1,293 inhabitants.

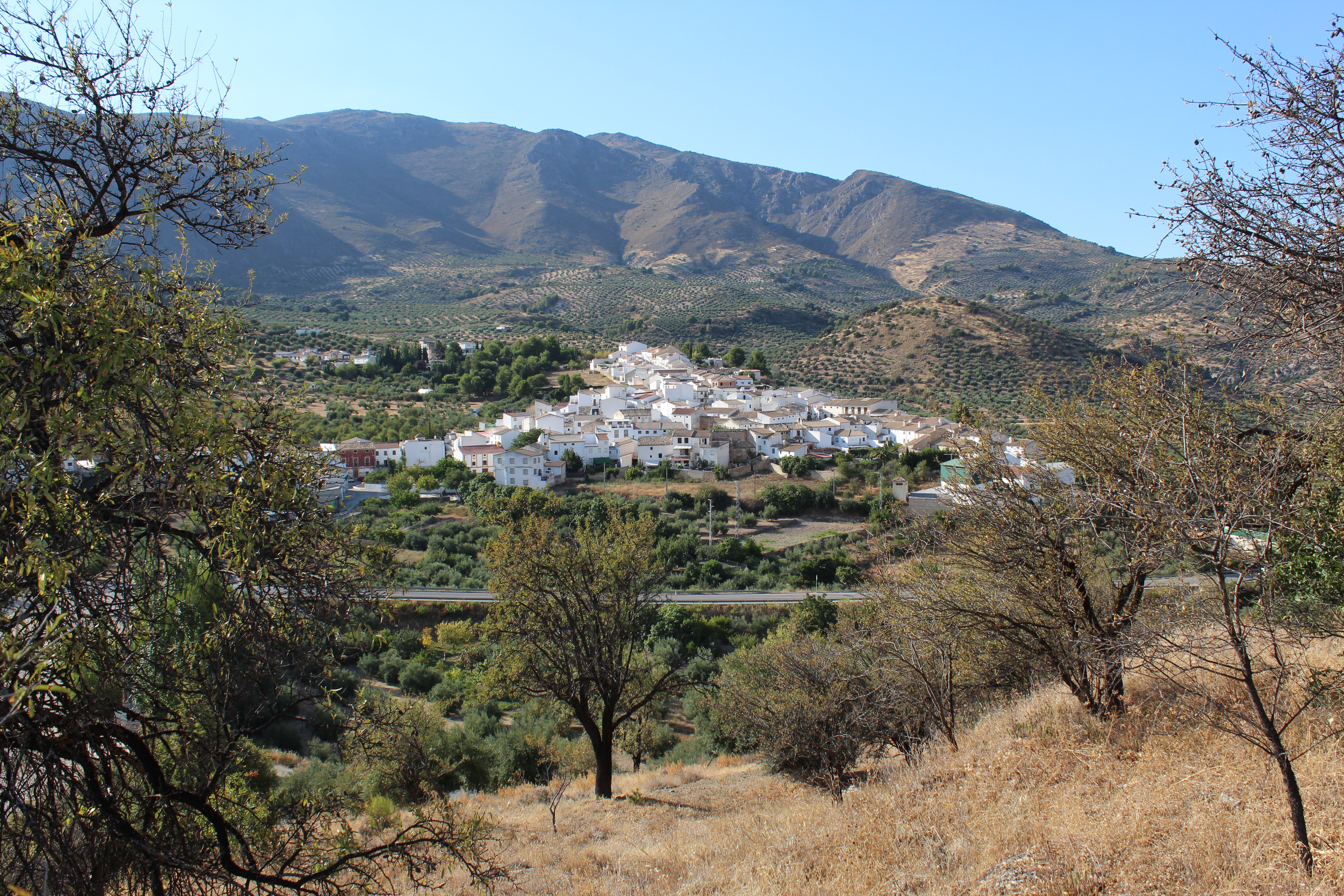
Panorama of Cárchel.

== See also ==
- List of municipalities in Jaén
