= Génave =

Génave, Spain
- city
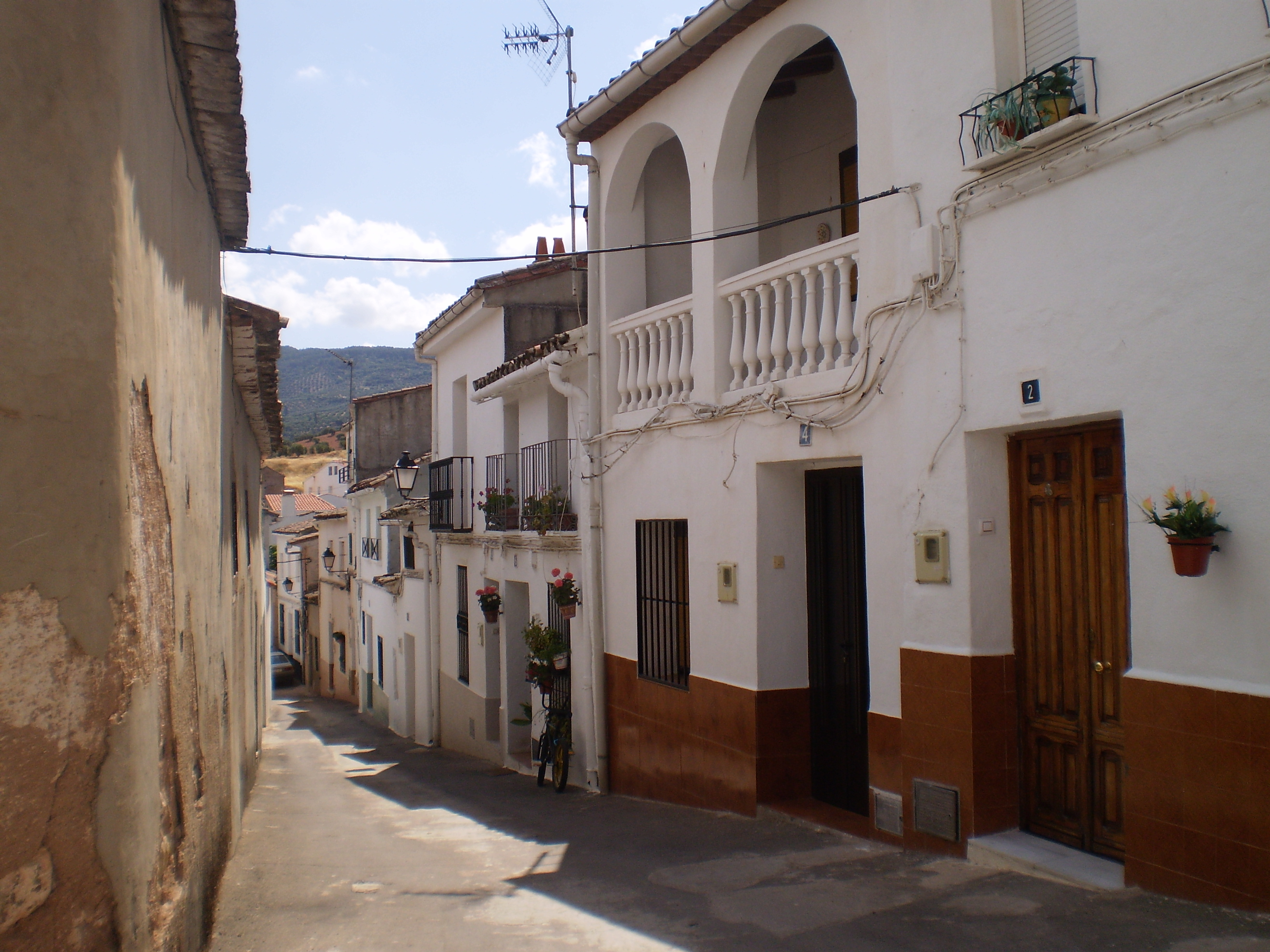
- Albaicín street in Génave

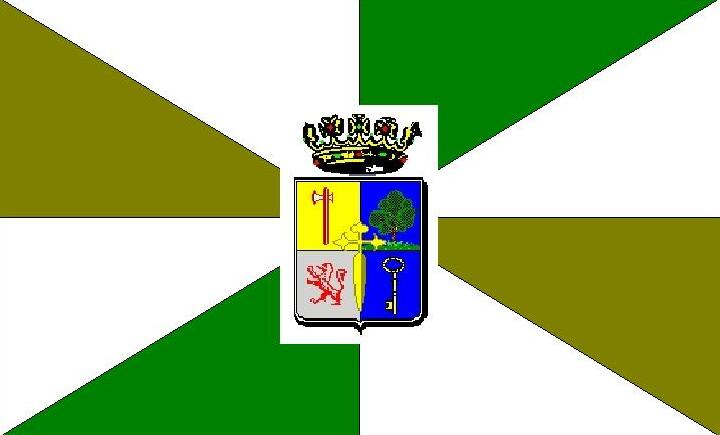
- Flag Coat of arms
- Interactive map of Génave, Spain
- Coordinates: 38°26′N 2°44′W
- Country: Spain
- Province: Jaén
- Municipality: Génave

Area
  - Total: 64 km^{2} (25 sq mi)
- Elevation: 823 m (2,700 ft)

Population (2025-01-01)
  - Total: 548
  - Density: 8.6/km^{2} (22/sq mi)
- Time zone: UTC+1 (CET)
  - Summer (DST): UTC+2 (CEST)

Génave is a city located in the province of Jaén, Spain. According to 2024 INE, the town had a population of 547 inhabitants.

== See also ==
- List of municipalities in Jaén
