= Torreblascopedro =

- City
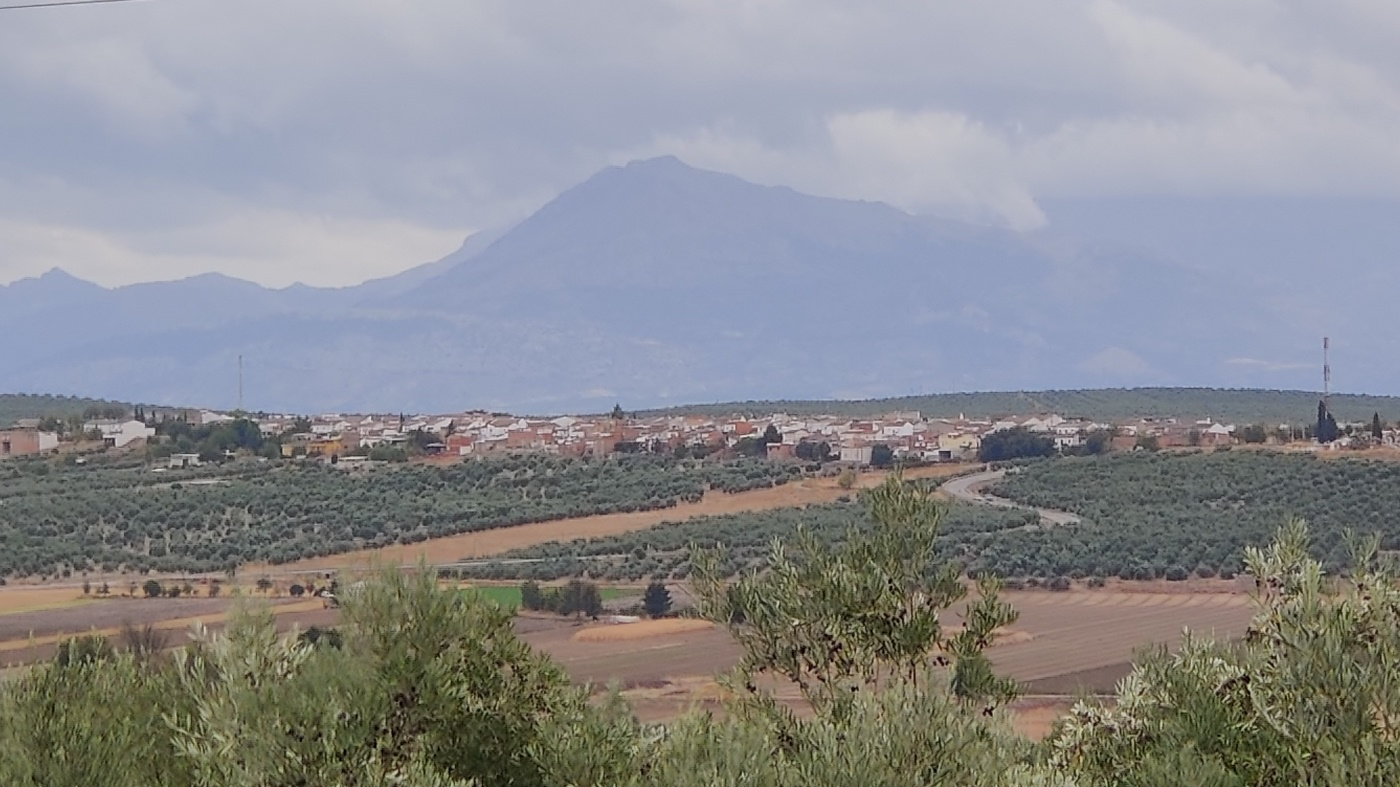

- Flag Coat of arms

- Location in the Province of Jaén Torreblascopedro (Andalusia) Torreblascopedro (Spain)
- Country: Spain
- Autonomous community: Andalusia
- Province: Jaén
- Municipality: Torreblascopedro

Area
  - Total: 60 km^{2} (23 sq mi)
- Elevation: 336 m (1,102 ft)

Population (2025-01-01)
  - Total: 2,382
  - Density: 40/km^{2} (100/sq mi)
- Time zone: UTC+1 (CET)
  - Summer (DST): UTC+2 (CEST)
- Website: http://www.promojaen.es/pit/fmt.asp?i=&m=81&op=1

Torreblascopedro is a city located in the province of Jaén, Spain. According to the 2005 census (INE), the city has a population of 2866 inhabitants.

== See also ==
- List of municipalities in Jaén
