= Ibros =

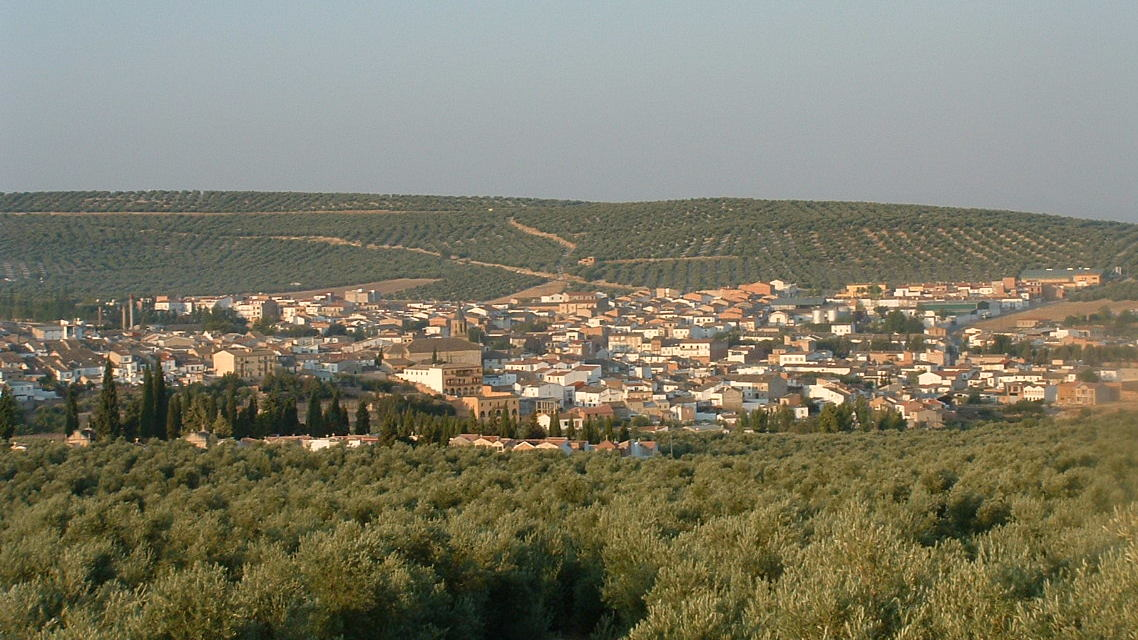

- Coat of arms

- Location in the Province of Jaén Ibros (Andalusia) Ibros (Spain)
- Coordinates: 38°01′N 3°30′W
- Country: Spain
- Autonomous community: Andalusia
- Province: Jaén

Area
  - Total: 55.74 km^{2} (21.52 sq mi)
- Elevation: 595 m (1,952 ft)

Population (2025-01-01)
  - Total: 2,773
  - Density: 49.75/km^{2} (128.8/sq mi)
- Time zone: UTC+1 (CET)
  - Summer (DST): UTC+2 (CEST)
- Website: http://www.ayunibros.es/

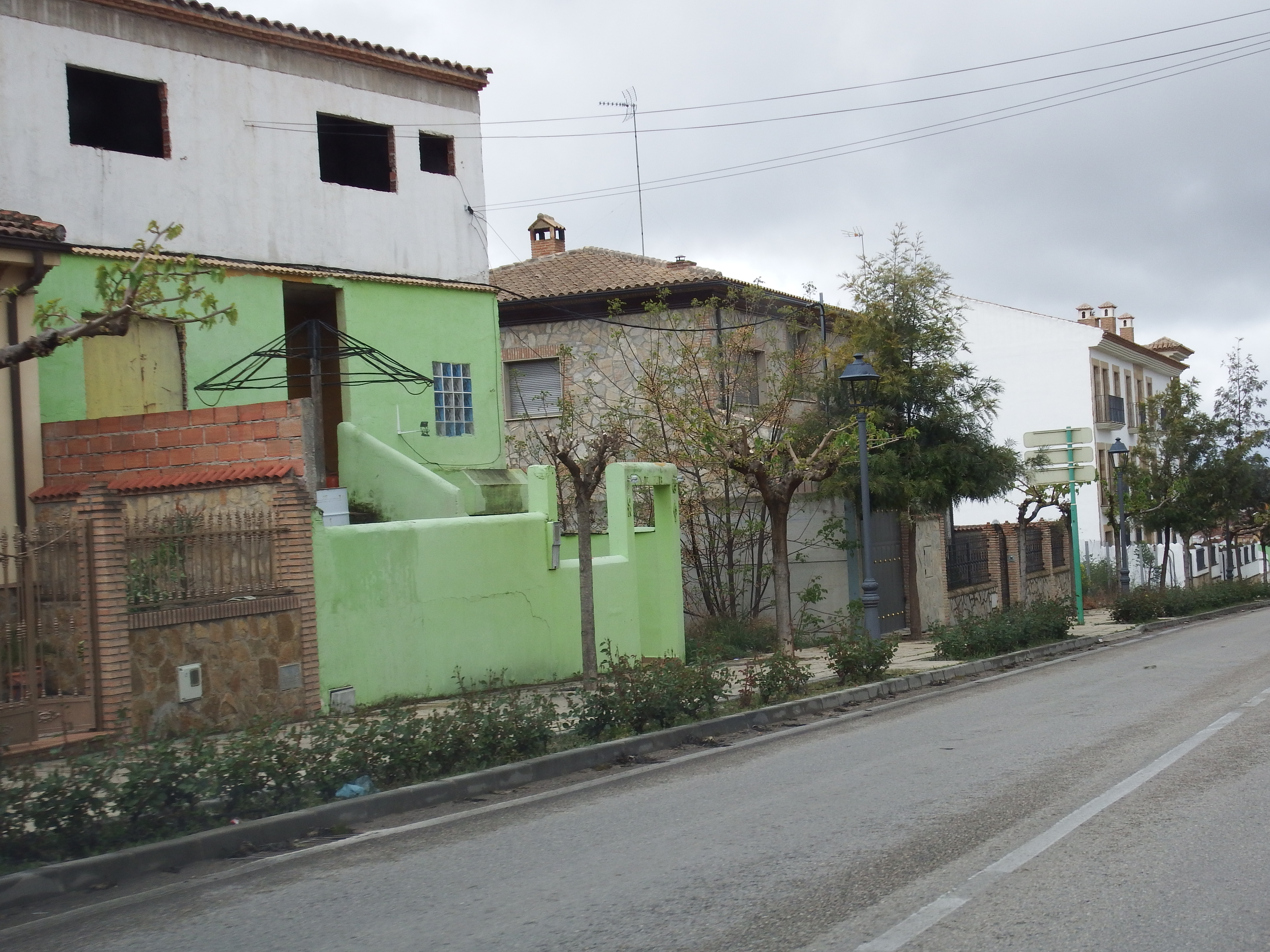
Street of Ibros

Ibros is a municipality in the province of Jaén, Spain.

== See also ==
- List of municipalities in Jaén
