= Bardenas Canal =

Spanish aqueduct

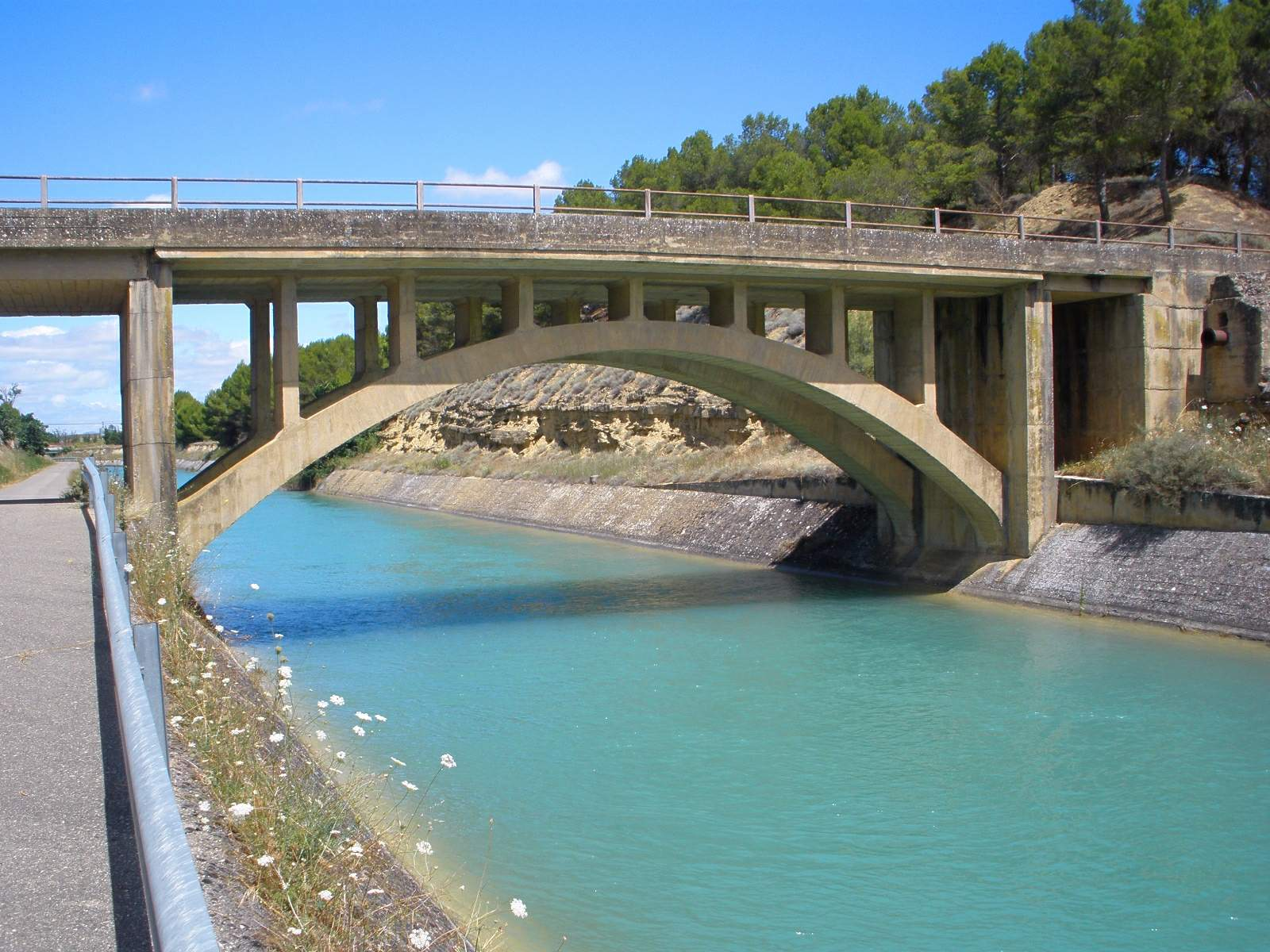
- The Bardenas canal as it passes through Sádaba (Zaragoza).

- Location in Spain
- Location: Spain
- Coordinates: 42.616669°N 1.183331°W
- Managing agency: Ebro Hydrographic Confederation
- Built: 1960

The Bardenas Canal (Basque: Bardenasen Kanal) is an aqueduct that carries water from the Navarre town of Yesa, in northern Spain, to the southern part of Navarre and Zaragoza.

It originates at the dam of the Yesa reservoir, where the Pyrenean waters of the Aragón river accumulate to be transferred to irrigate the Bardenas Reales and the Aragonese region of Cinco Villas, and ends at the Ardisa reservoir, on the Gállego river. It contributes 8 hm³ (cubic hectometers) to the El Ferial reservoir in Bardenas.

== Technical data ==
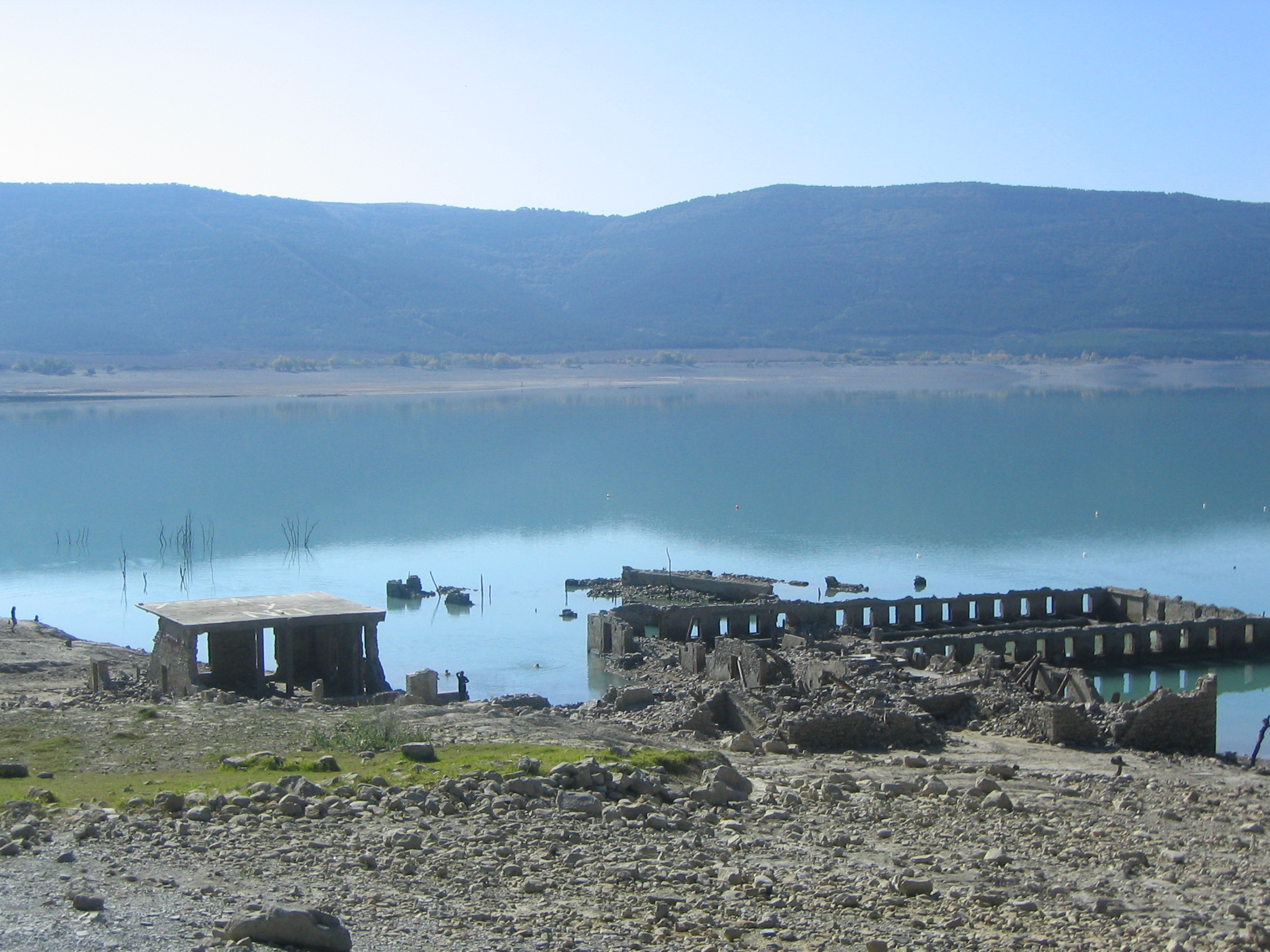
Partial view of the Yesa reservoir.

The length of the Bardenas canal is 132 km, with a flow capacity of 60 m^{3}/s (cubic meters per second), making possible the irrigation (as of 2006) of 81,107.64 ha (hectares) of irrigated land, 18,941.61 ha (23.35%) in the province of Navarra and 62,166.03 ha (76.65%) in the province of Zaragoza, which together with the supply to the 54,777 inhabitants who depend directly on the system, demand an average annual flow of 467 hm³ of water. The average annual demand is 467 hm³ and its section is trapezoidal.

The intake of the dam for the Bardenas canal is at an elevation of 453.35 m (meters) on the left side. It is composed of three 2 m diameter pipes governed by ring-seal valves and Tainter type gates. The total normal flow is 90 m^{3}/s (30 m^{3}/s each). The canal crosses a tunnel, the Cáseda tunnel, 6.3 km (kilometers) long.

The route is divided into three sections called Bardenas I, Bardenas II and Bardenas III, which in turn is subdivided into another seven sections (Bardenas III is still under construction). The initial capacity of 60 m^{3}/s (some sources indicate 64 m^{3}/s) is reduced to 30 m^{3}/s in the last section.

The irrigable area of Bardenas I is about 60,000 ha (40,000 ha of Zaragoza and 20,000 ha of Navarra); the irrigable area extends from Sangüesa in the north to Tauste in the south. The irrigable area of Bardenas II is 28,000 ha (totaling about 15% of all irrigated land in the Ebro basin using canals). At the end, when the third section is completed, the irrigable area will be about 88,000 ha, although the canal capacity was designed to cover 110,000 ha.

Water is distributed by means of a network of irrigation ditches, the main ones being those of the La Pardina Canal, the Navarra, Cinco Villas and Saso irrigation ditches in Bardenas I, and the Sora irrigation ditch in Bardenas II.

=== Route ===
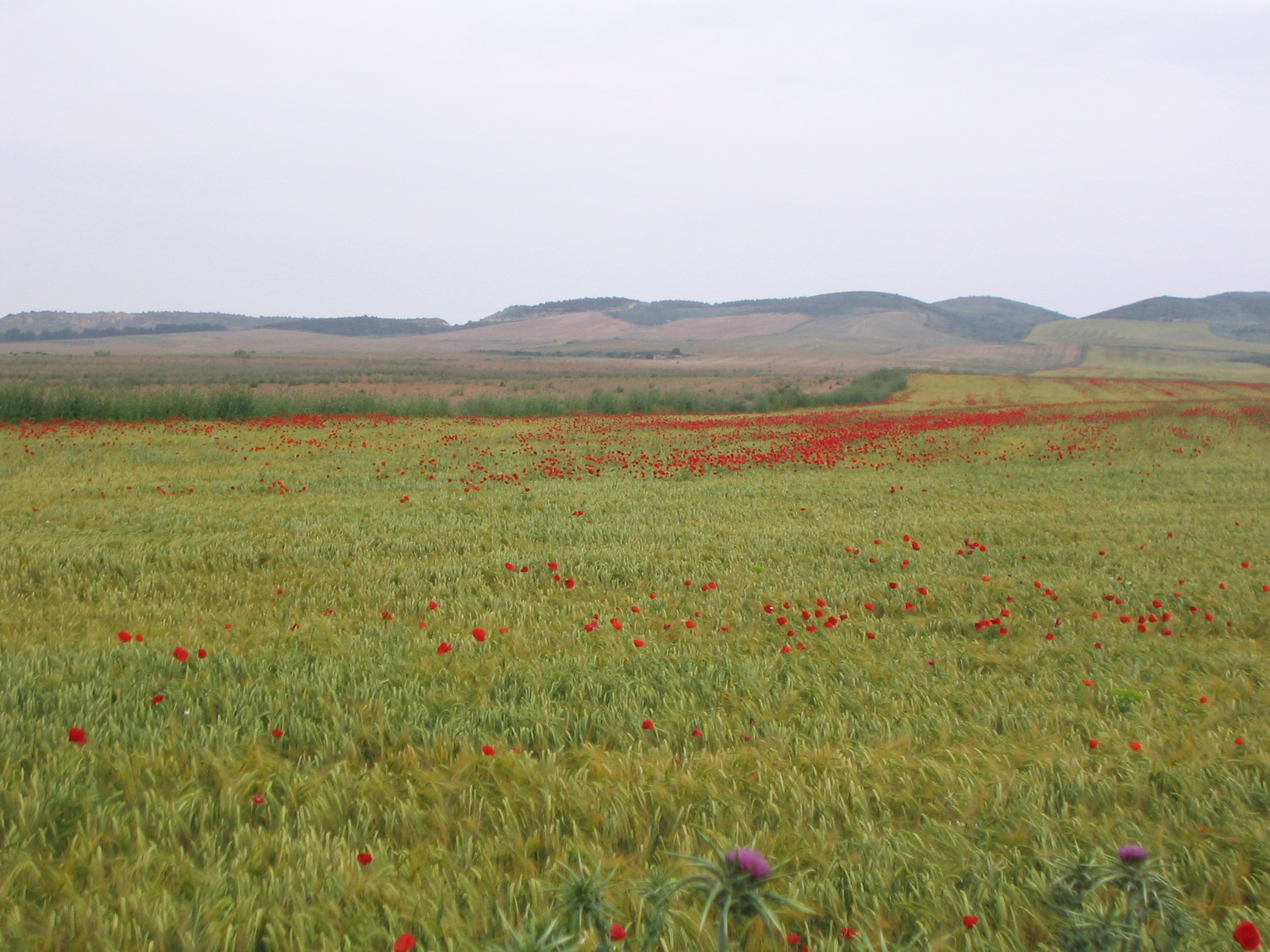
Cereal cultivation in the Bardenas.

==== Bardenas I ====
The first part of the canal, Bardenas I, from Yesa to the Arba de Luesia river, is 72 km long. In this part the canal is derived in the following irrigation ditches:

Ditches of La Pardina Canal (Bardena I)
Name	Abbreviated	Length km	Original flow rate m^{3}/sec
Navarre irrigation ditch	A-1	32	8
Cinco Villas irrigation ditch	A-2	52	15
Cascajos irrigation ditch	A-3	22	8
Saso irrigation ditch	A-4	11	7

==== Bardenas II ====
Once the Arba de Luesia river is crossed, the second section, Bardenas II, begins. This area is divided in two, in the basin of the Gállego and in that of the Arba. The Arba basin is irrigated with sections V and VI (40.8 km) and with the Sora irrigation ditch (A-5), which is 55.3 km long, ending in Pradilla de Ebro, forming an irrigated area of 28,610 ha.

In the Gállego basin, section VII and the Zuera irrigation ditch, which ends in Villanueva de Gállego, covers an irrigated area of 11,625 ha, making the total area of the Bardenas II section 40,235 ha.

==== Bardenas III ====
The Bardenas III, or VII, section was submitted for public information in 1975 and has not yet been built. There is a proposal to build a reservoir at Marracos, with a capacity of 422 m^{3}, which would be filled with the waters of the Bardenas canal to assist irrigation in Alto Aragón and could be conveyed to the Sotonera reservoir, from where the Monegros canal flows, and could also regulate the waters of the Gállego. The link between the Aragón and the Gállego, which would complete the Plan Bardenas-Alto Aragón, forming an irrigated area of 268,000 ha.

== Settlement and production ==
The development of the irrigable areas of Bardenas I was carried out by means of coordination plans made by the National Institute of Colonization, which was in charge of the construction of the secondary networks, complementary works, land leveling, reforestation, construction of new villages and settlement of farmers in the new irrigated areas. The Ebro Hydrographic Confederation was in charge of the water supply.

15 new villages were founded, five in Navarra, Gabarderal, El Boyeral, Figarol, Rada and San Isidro del Pinar, and 10 in Aragón, Alera, Bardena, Campo Real, El Bayo, Pinsoro, El Sabinar, Sancho Abarca, Santa Anastasia, Santa Engracia and Valareña, which housed 1267 families that in several cases came from the villages that were left uninhabited in the Berdún canal, as in the case of the colonization village of El Bayo, to which many families from Tiermas had to emigrate.

Bardenas II, with 28,610 ha of irrigated land, has not generated any new population.

The irrigated production to which the waters of the Bardenas canal are dedicated is mainly made up of extensive herbaceous crops such as corn, wheat, barley, etc. There are also vegetable gardens with products such as tomatoes and peppers, among many others, and rice fields.

== History ==
=== Background ===
The use of water from the Aragon River has been considered since the Middle Ages: as early as 1498, a proposal was made to the King of Aragon, Ferdinand the Catholic, to divert water from the river to be used for irrigation by the Council of Tauste. In 1622 it was proposed to build a canal to the Bardenas to irrigate the lands of an abbey that was planned to be built there. In 1702 the engineer Josef Estorguia and the arm of the hijosdalgo knights launched the proposal to divert the river so that it would run through Aragonese lands, thus avoiding the payment of tariffs and tolls to the Navarrese. 54 years later, in 1756, a project was drawn up for the construction of a canal that, originating in Tiermas, was to irrigate the Aragonese region of Cinco Villas. Soon after, another project was presented, this time by Captain J. A. Monroy, who proposed a canal (which had its source at a similar level to the present Bardenas), which would irrigate the region of Cinco Villas and Bardenas, with a total of 15,228 ha of irrigated land, as well as the construction of 18 new urban settlements.

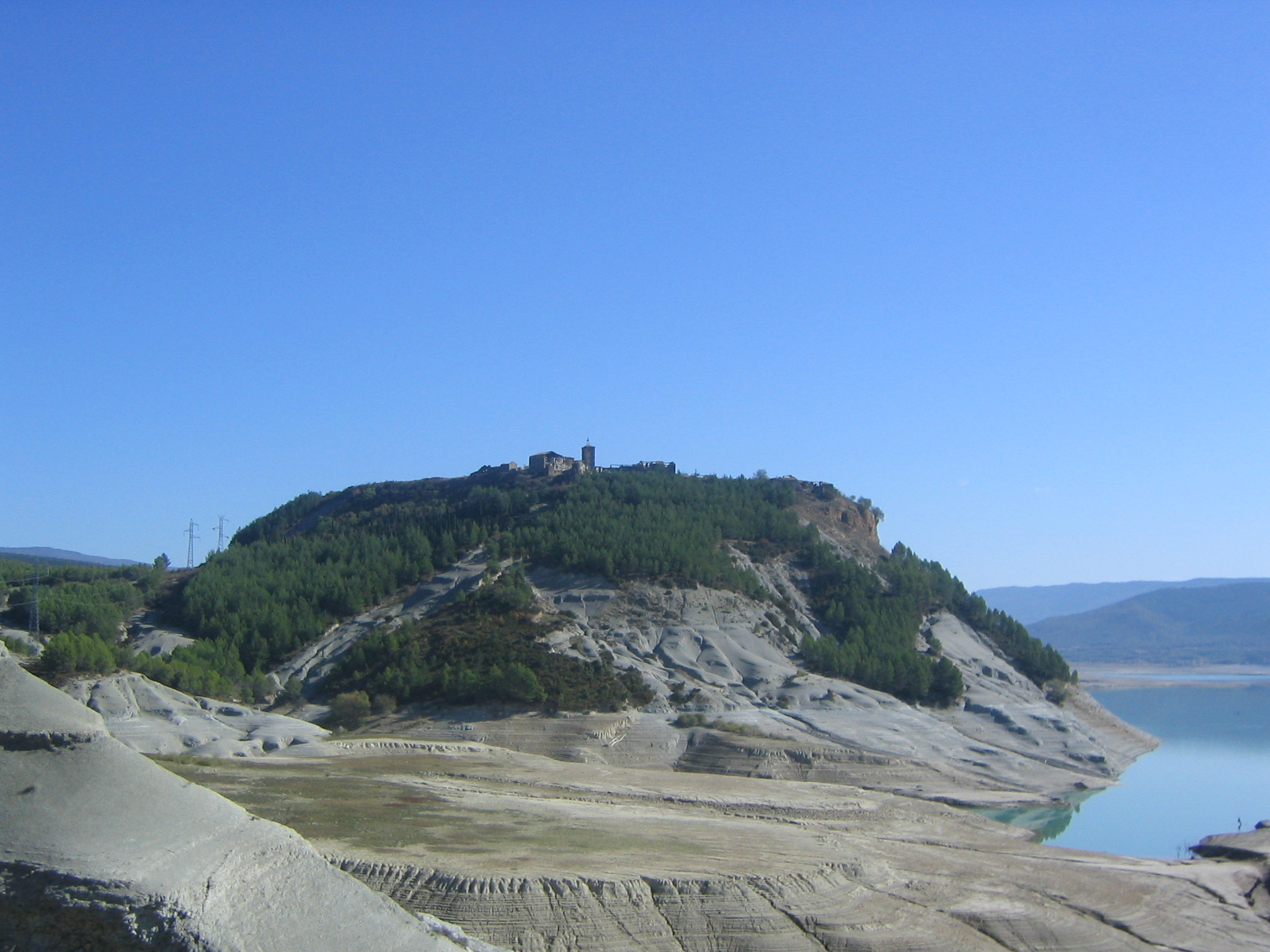
View of Tiermas over the Yesa Reservoir.

In 1865 a company was created for the construction of an irrigation canal to go down to the Bardenas. The project was designed by Antonio de Lesarri. The company would be in charge of the construction in exchange for the concession of the use of the water and the irrigators paying the corresponding alfardas. In 1880 the concession was declared null and void, since the works had not begun.

In 1902 a Royal Decree of April 25 proposed a Plan Nacional de Obras Hidráulicas in which a hydraulic complex appeared, consisting of the Bardenas de Yesa, Foz de Biniés, Salvatierra and Usún canals, each with a reservoir. This complex would generate an irrigated area of 30,000 ha in several towns in Navarra and Zaragoza. The reservoirs would be located as follows: that of Yesa, where the present one is located; that of Foz de Biniés in the waters of the river Veral; that of Salvatierra, on the river Esca; that of Usún would be located in the valley of Salazar, 6 km from Lumbier. Together with this proposal there were also those of the Imperial Canal of Aragón and the Lodosa Canal, which made the need to regulate the Aragón and its tributaries even more evident.

On March 2, 1909, the Ebro Hydraulic Division was commissioned to study the Yesa Dam project. This project was carried out by the engineers Cornelio Arellano, first, and Manuel Abascal later, finishing it in 1912. The canal project was not approved until 1917. The dam designed was a 53 m high gravity dam.

=== The project ===
In 1923 a new project was commissioned, drawn up by the engineers Felix de los Ríos, Mariano Vicente and Antonio Colom, who carried out the study on the basis of an irrigable surface area of 130,000 ha, to contribute 400,000 million cubic meters per year to the Ardisa dam and to supply drinking water to Saragossa. This proposal was included in the linking of the three large rivers on the left side of the Ebro, the Aragon, the Gallego and the Cinca.

On 7 May 1926, a Royal Order approved the Yesa Dam project, making it compulsory to respect the uses and exploitation of the water downstream of the dam. The same team that designed the dam designed the Bardenas Canal, presenting their work on 29 December 1924. This would be approved 8 years later, on June 30, 1932, by a Resolution of the General Directorate of Hydraulic Works. In 1926 it was estimated that Yesa Reservoir would only be used for the irrigation of the Bardenas and the Cinco Villas region, and its possible contribution to the Imperial Canal of Aragón was rejected. In the I Plan General de Obras y Trabajos varios de la Confederación Hidrográfica del Ebro, in 1926, the construction of Yesa Reservoir was proposed. This would have a capacity of 470 hm³ for the Bardenas Canal and the irrigation of the farming area of the basin itself, some 15,000 ha, although the possibility of a contribution to the Imperial Canal was still being discussed so that it would free up resources for the Lodosa Canal. The forecasts for the Bardenas canal, which was to reach Ardisa from Yesa, were for a dam outlet of 60 m^{3}/s, of which 39 m^{3}/s would reach Ardisa.

=== The execution ===
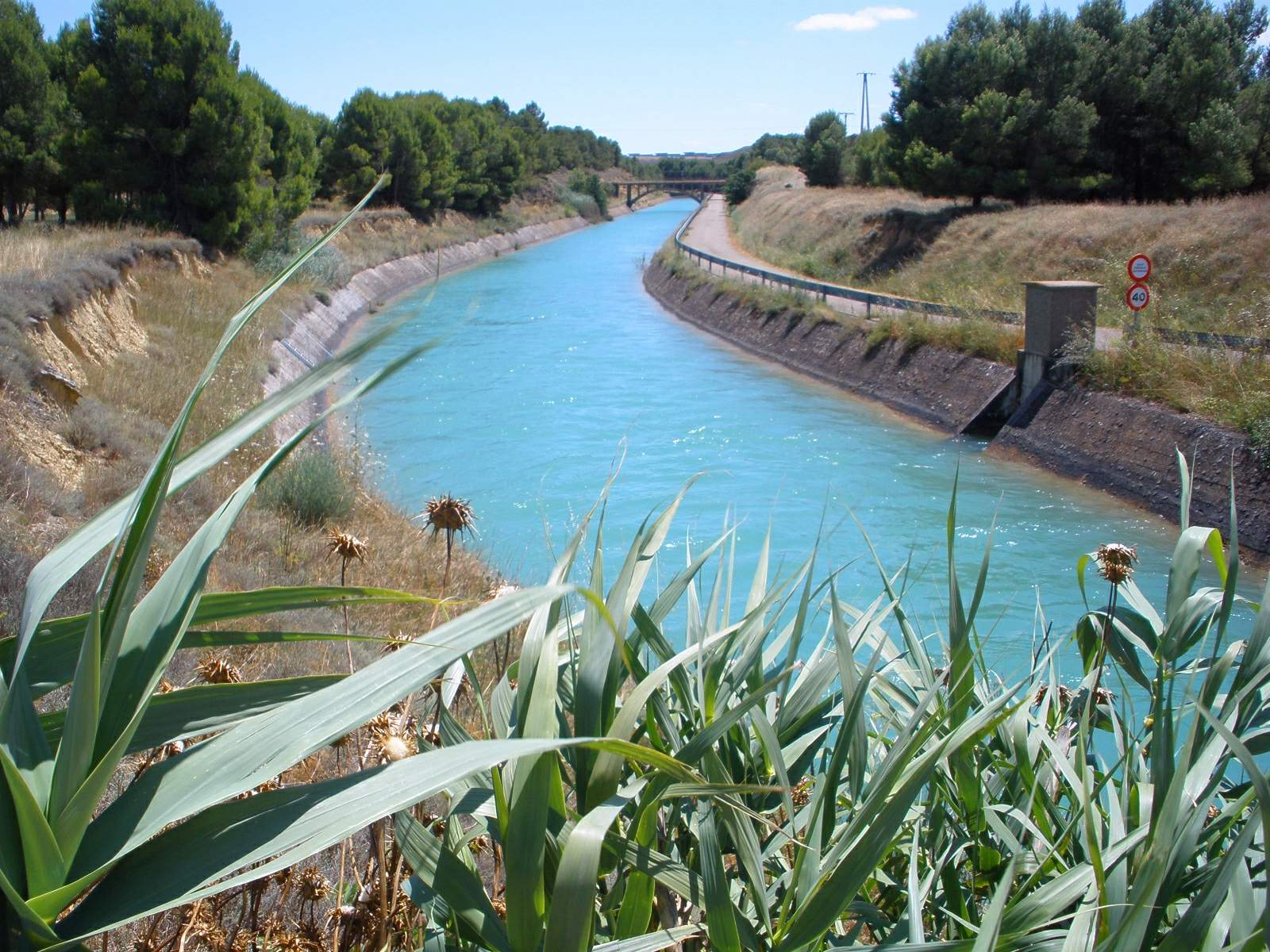
The Bardenas Canal as it passes through Sádaba.

In the II Plan de Obras de la Confederación, which was published the following year, the works were delayed because it was considered that the studies of the regime, flow and layout of the canal and the capacity of the reservoir had not been carried out properly. That same year the Agronomic Service of the Hydrographic Confederation prepared and published a study in which it foresaw the conversion of 80,000 ha into intensive irrigation and another 30,000 ha into semi-intensive irrigation. For this purpose, it estimated that 619,952 hm³/year of water would be needed, with an incidence of use in the summer months.

On 13 November 1928 the foundation works for the dam, which had been put out to tender in the III Plan de Obras y Trabajos, began. In this same Plan de Obras y Trabajos it was decided to lower the route of the Bardenas canal, especially once in the Riguel river basin. The IV Plan de Obras, that of 1929, proposes reservoirs complementary to the Yesa reservoir to supply the Bardenas Canal. In this year the definitive project for some sections of the canal was already being carried out, following the route indicated in the previous plan, and the following year the decision was already taken to build it. By 1933, construction had already begun.

After the Civil War, in which the works were stopped, they were resumed with the construction of the variant of the race in 1940 and the excavation of the right slope. In 1945, by the hand of Rene Petit, two renovations of the project were carried out, the first one was approved by Ministerial Order on February 6 and the second and definitive one on September 15. The uses to be given to the Yesa water were definitively designated, which were the same as those foreseen in the Félix de los Ríos project, but the irrigable surface area was reduced to 110,000 ha. On October 19, 1951, the transformation into irrigation of the area of the first part of the canal which reaches the river Arba de Luesia was declared by Royal Decree to be of high national interest.

The National Institute of Colonization is entrusted with the general irrigation project for the Bardenas Canal. On February 12, 1954, the project for the first part of the canal was approved and a Joint Technical Commission was formed, which was in charge of drawing up the Plan Coordinado de Obras, which was approved on March 28, 1955. In 1959, work was completed on the dam, which came into service in 1960 together with the first part of the canal, serving 21,000 ha of the 110,000 ha planned.

On July 1, 1971, the conversion into irrigated land of the second phase of the canal was declared to be of high national interest, covering an area of 27,000 ha belonging to the Zaragoza towns of Ejea de los Caballeros, Luna, Sierra de Luna, Tauste, Pradilla de Ebro and Remolinos.

On May 10, 1973, the Plan General de Transformación de la Zona Regable de la Segunda Parte de Canal de Bardenas was approved, this plan was modified in 1973, delimiting the irrigation area. On July 14, 1980, and July 22, 1982, the coordinated works plans were approved, allowing the completion of the canal and the extension of irrigation to another 30,000 ha, also taking advantage of the Sora irrigation ditch.

The Bardenas II section is under construction while the third and last Bardenas III section has not yet been started.

In order to increase the inflow of the Bardenas canal, it has been decided to increase the Yesa dam to triple its capacity, turning it into a hyperannual reservoir. The construction of three lateral reservoirs, those of Malvecino, La Berné and Carcastillo, has also been proposed.

== See also ==
- Bardenas
- Yesa Reservoir
- Imperial Canal of Aragon
- Tiermas
