= Aguas Nuevas =

Village in Spain

Coordinates: 38.920°N 1.920°W

Aguas Nuevas is a village in Albacete, Castile-La Mancha, Spain. It is a small community belonging to the municipality of Albacete. It is located south of the Spanish capital. In 2023 it had 1968 inhabitants according to the INE.

== Historical origin ==
The origin of the Aguas Nuevas is in the Franco years, one of the so-called "settlement villages" created by the IRYDA. With a registered population of around 3900 inhabitants registered, Aguas Nuevas is a recently founded village. It was in the sixties when the village was created as a result of the upwelling of the high flows in the area of El Pasico (1961) and the Llanos in Albacete, after it was declared of national interest. Nuevas Aguas was formed as a predominantly agricultural town in the mid-twentieth century.

== Location ==
Aguas Nuevas is very close to the Albacete-Los Llanos airport and the Los Llanos Air Base. It lies southwest of the city of Albacete, just 8 kilometers from the capital by Ctra CM-3203, between the districts of El Salobral and Santa Ana, which is only 5 km away.

== Landscape and architecture ==
Agricultural irrigation has lost some of its former importance and the dynamics of the urban population tends towards joining the emerging Albacete metropolitan. Aguas Nuevas, however, retains a unique urban setting: spacious houses of whitewashed masonry with various units of crops and livestock in coexistence with large green areas. Within its town one can visit the parish church with a wonderful façade in blue and white tiles and a spectacular bell tower visible from anywhere in the Albacete plains and the building used for administrative purposes with white-blue ceramic decorations, a statue of the San Isidro Labrador and a boundary cross, which over time remains incomplete, various sources and watering holes in granite.
