= Bardenas =

Settlement in Zaragoza Province, Aragon, Spain

- Settlement
- Country: Spain
- Province: Zaragoza
- Comarca: Cinco Villas
- Municipality: Ejea de los Caballeros
- Established: 1959

Area
  - Total: 29.86 km^{2} (11.53 sq mi)
- Elevation: 379 m (1,243 ft)

Population
  - Total: 50,694
- Demonym(s): Bardenero, a
- Postal code: 50694
- Area code: 976

Bardenas (founded in 1959, until 2008 its name was Bardena del Caudillo), is a settlement in the municipality of Ejea de los Caballeros, in the province of Zaragoza.

== History ==
It was founded on April 8, 1959, as Bardena del Caudillo, due to its foundation during Franco's dictatorship and as a plan of the Instituto Nacional de Colonización (INC); at first it was intended to be baptized as El Saso in homage to the land near the area. At the same time, other colonization villages such as El Bayo or Santa Anastasia were also inaugurated, and the Bardenas Canal and the Yesa Reservoir were built.

During the first months, several families settled in the town, reaching 15 by mid-August. In 1967 the number of settlers increased to 154, mostly from Ejea de los Caballeros, Alcalá de Moncayo, Tranquera, Rivas and Biota.

Over the years, Bardenas became a village where to develop a life with a total of 220 houses built. It also has a nursery school, social center, church and parish house, as well as a public swimming pool and a grass soccer field.

== Change of name ==
On May 5, 2008, as was previously done in other Spanish towns, the town was renamed Bardenas by decision of the Ejea de los Caballeros Town Council and in order to sever its relationship with the Franco dictatorship.

Its name derives from the Aragonese word pardina > bardina > bardena, construction or fenced farmland.

== Associations ==
- Cinco Villas Jota Group
- CDE Bardenas
- CDE BTT Bardenas
- Las Bardenas Pensioners' Home
- El Pinar Neighborhood Association

== Demographics ==
Population of Bardenas from 2000 to 2014.

	2000	2001	2002	2003	2004	2005	2006	2007	2008	2009	2010	2011	2012	2013	2014
Men	334	390	399	375	356	359	332	334	324	305	306	311	296	295	291
Women	315	315	316	304	301	293	276	265	255	259	258	251	245	240	240
Total	649	705	715	679	657	652	608	599	579	564	564	562	541	535	531

== Festivities ==
On May 15, the festivities in honor of Isidore the Laborer are celebrated, although the main festivities are held from the first Wednesday of August until Sunday of that week. These festivities are in honor of St. Francis of Assisi.

== See also ==
- Bardenas Canal
- Yesa Reservoir
