= Galisteo =

Galisteo may refer to:

- Galisteo, Cáceres, a town in Extremadura, Spain
- Galisteo, New Mexico, a census-designated place and village in New Mexico
- Galisteo Basin, a basin in New Mexico where the Galisteo River (Galisteo Creek) flows

== Persons ==
- José Galisteo, (born 1977), Spanish singer

== See also ==
- Guijo de Galisteo, a municipality located in the province of Cáceres, Extremadura, Spain
