= Odón E. Luis Abad Flores =

- Born: November 18, 1929; Puerto Tarafa, Camagüey, Cuba
- Died: May 26, 2016 (aged 86)
- Occupations: Professor, writer, agricultural engineer

Odón E. Luis Abad Flores (born in Puerto Tarafa, Camagüey, Cuba, on 18 November 1929 – died 26 May 2016) was a Galician professor, writer, and agricultural engineer. He had lived in Galicia since 1932.

== Career ==
External image
- Image in La Voz de Galicia

A son of emigrants, he obtained a doctorate in agricultural engineering from the Escuela Superior Técnica de Ingenieros Agrónomos in Madrid in 1960. There, he founded the journal Agro. That same year he joined the National Land Consolidation Service in A Coruña, and in 1963 became the first provincial chief engineer of that agency in Lugo. He was also sub-director and professor of Phytotechnics and Engines and Machines at the School of Agricultural Technical Engineering of Lugo from its founding until 1971. At this school, he founded the journal Fronte e Cocote and directed its first issues.

In 1972 he was appointed regional inspector in Galicia of the newly created National Institute for Agrarian Reform and Development (IRYDA), serving until 1984, when he was named Director General of Agrarian Planning and Development of the Galician Government, a post he held until 1986.

He dedicated his life to the study of Galician agriculture. He carried out or directed land consolidation for over ten thousand hectares and the construction of more than five thousand kilometers of rural roads. He also participated in the rural electrification process of the National Institute of Colonization (INC).

He published several books and numerous scientific and literary works (Estampas do meu amigo Pepiño, Los Cinco Traperos, Década de Fermín, Una opción para la reforma agraria de Galicia, Complemento al Catón galego de Ben Cho Sey, etc.), as well as articles in the press and professional journals. He gave countless lectures on ecology, urban solid waste, alternative energies, new technologies, population genetics, and GM foods. For four years, he was responsible for the agricultural pages of La Voz de Galicia and participated in several commissions and organizations related to Galician agricultural policy. He often used the pseudonyms Dabades, Pau de Vimbio, Garabolos, or O cabalo de diante.

He was a full member of the Royal Academy of Medicine and Surgery of Galicia and of the Royal Galician Academy of Sciences since 1982, and a full member of the Instituto José Cornide de Estudos Coruñeses since 1984. He was also a member of the Association Général des Hygienistes et Techniciens Municipaux from 1989 to 1999.

He was a founding member of FEROGASA, drafted its implementation project, and served as director of its board of directors during 1996–1997.

== Major works ==
- Introducción á economía galega de hoxe, 1969. With Mario Orjales Pita et al.
- Una opción para la reforma agraria de Galicia
- A reforma agraria do minifundio
- Máquinas e trebellos pra labrar a terra: complemento agrícola ó catón galego. Sada (A Coruña): Ediciós do Castro, 1970
- Estampas do meu amigo Pepiño. Sada (A Coruña): Ediciós do Castro, 1980. Illustrated by the author, foreword by Isaac Díaz Pardo. ISBN 84-7492-024-8
- A cousa agraria no Estatuto de Autonomía. Vigo: Galaxia, 1980

== Awards ==
- "Pérez Lugín" Prize (1951), from the Asociación de la Prensa de La Coruña for his work Galicia a través de los personajes de Emilia Pardo Bazán.
- Officer of the Civil Order of Agricultural Merit.
- "Fernández Latorre" Prize (1964) for his article O grao de corvo, one of the short stories included in the book Estampas do meu amigo Pepiño.
