= Artistas del Gremio =

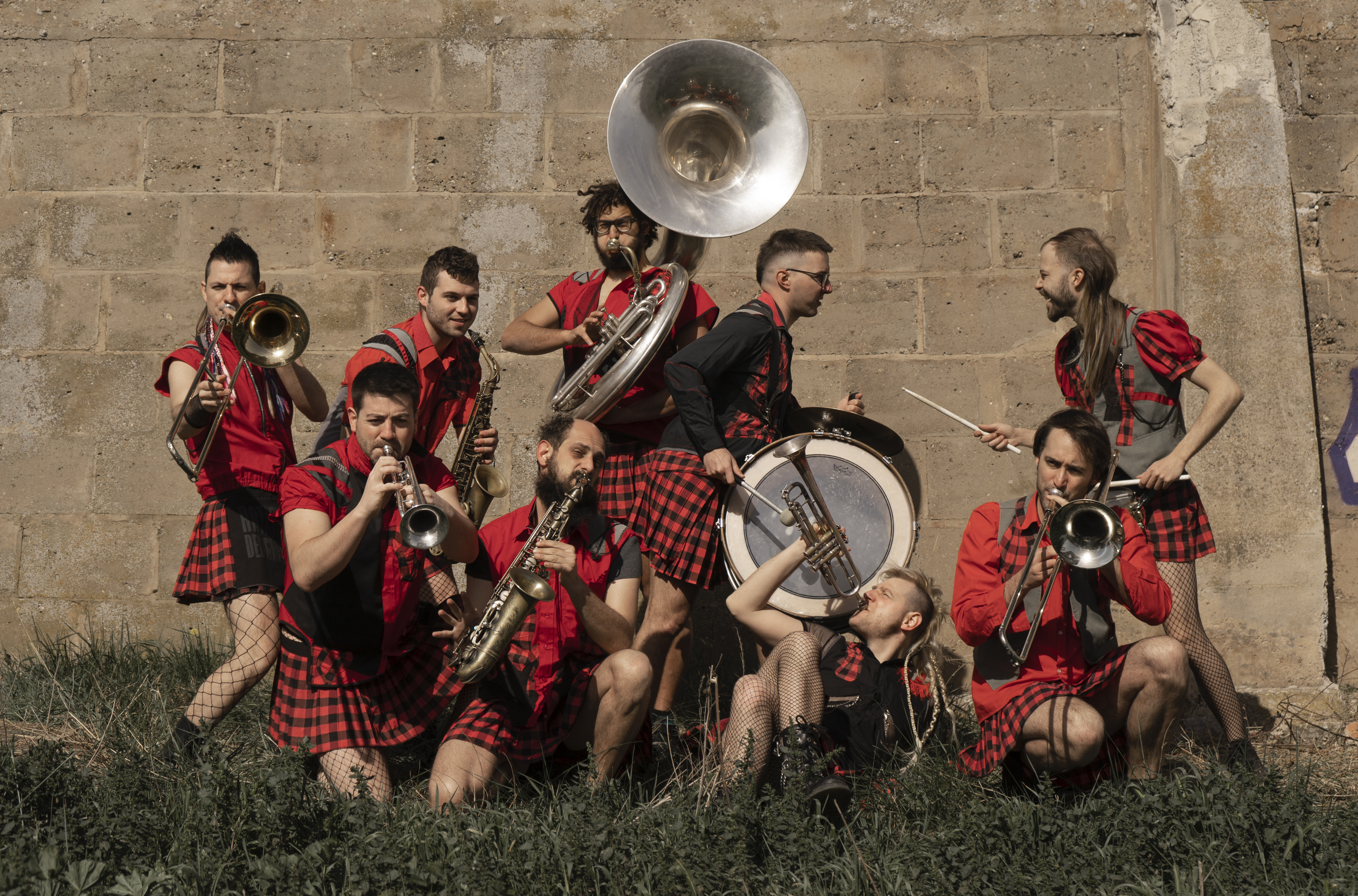

Background information
- Born: 2005 (age 19–20); Ejea de los Caballeros Zaragoza Spain
- Genres: Street music, brass and percussion
- Instrument(s): Miguel Ángel Laita (trumpet), Jaime Olite (trumpet), Roberto Laita (trombone), Víctor Mateo (trombone), Carlos Sagaste (saxophone), Alejandro Burges (saxophone), Felipe Martins (sousaphone), Ángel Mójica (percussion) and Andrés Lasilla (percussion).
- Website: http://artistasdelgremio.com/

Artistas del Gremio is a Spanish fanfare-type music band, composed of brass and percussion instruments and performing music and street shows. It was founded in Ejea de los Caballeros (Zaragoza) in 2005. Since then has toured the Iberian Peninsula and performed in several European countries and Ecuador. They have participated in the soundtracks of a film and several television programs. They have recorded 4 albums and a documentary that show the evolution of the band.

== History ==
The beginnings of the band are in the fiesta and friendship. It was formed in 2004 in the Aragonese town of Ejea de los Caballeros (Zaragoza). A young woman wanted to celebrate her hen party with a brass band and got in touch with a friend, Ángel Mójica, who gathered a few others and gave their first public performance. The founders or first members took part in it: Miguel Ángel Laita and his brother Roberto Carlos, Andrés Lasilla and Ángel Mójica. They had a lot of fun with the experience, and the band started to work.

In its first days, the repertoire of Artistas del Gremio included cover versions and popular songs. With these songs they toured the festivals of the towns and cities of Spain. Soon they began to compose their own songs, such as "Dame una A", the adaptation of "La Sandía" or the songs that appear in "¡¡¡Viva el deskontrol!!!", as well as different remixes (Supertechnomegamix Vol.1, Punkpurrí...). Gradually this kind of songs became popular in Spanish popular parties.

They stand out for their original attire -they always perform in miniskirts and for their shows of music, theater and humor in interaction with the audience.

In 2010 they recorded the original soundtrack for the film Que se mueran los feos, directed by Nacho García Velilla. In 2013 they were "superfinalists" in the television contest Tú sí que vales, which meant a media step and a boost of visibility at national level. In 2016 they starred in and co-produced the autobiographical documentary film Sol, furgoneta y manta, which tells the story of the charanga's struggles and lifestyle, with special emphasis on the path that allowed them to turn music into their way of life.

Artistas del Gremio was the band of the program Avispas & Tomates on Aragón TV during the 2006-2007 season and participated in the New Year's Eve galas of 2011, 2012, 2013 and 2014 on the same channel. The band appeared occasionally in other programs such as Aftersún, Sin ir más lejos, Objetivo, Anochece que no es poco, Aragón en abierto, ¿Te suena? and Lo sabe, no lo sabe.

In 2019 they were selected for the "Girando por Salas" (GPS) circuit, a tour that was finally cancelled on the occasion of COVID-19.

With a repertoire that ranges in age, the band plays about 120 performances a year. They have also performed in solidarity shows for children with cancer in Aragon (ASPANOA).

In 2021, the band is composed of 9 musicians: Miguel Ángel Laita (trumpet), Jaime Olite (trumpet), Roberto Laita (trombone), Víctor Mateo (trombone), Carlos Sagaste (saxophone), Alejandro Burges (saxophone), Felipe Martins (sousaphone), Ángel Mójica (percussion) and Andrés Lasilla (percussion).

== Festivals ==
- Corralejo Kite Fest (Corralejo, España; 2021)
- Drumline Battle Baltic (Panevezys, Lituania; 2021)
- Festival Amante (Borja, España; 2021)
- Galaico Brass Festival (Merza, España, 2021)
- Berlin Brass Festival (Berlín, Alemania; 2019)
- Move Your Brass (Katowice, Polonia; 2019)
- Brass International Festival (Durham, Reino Unido; 2015, 2017, 2018 y 2019)
- Holika Festival (Cortes, España; 2019)
- Tamborilé (Mezquita de Jarque; España 2011, 2019)
- Festival OFF Artes Vivas (Loja, Ecuador; 2018)
- Brass It (Minde, Portugal; 2018)
- Sibiu International Theatre Festival (Sibiu, Rumanía; 2018)
- Limoux Brass Festival (Limoux, Francia; 2018)
- Almazán Suena (Almazán; España 2018)
- Boina Fest (Arenillas; España 2018)
- Festival Moustoussades (Villemoustaussou, Francia; 2015, 2016 y 2017)
- Andorra Sax Fest (Andorra; 2017)
- Sol y fiesta (Leucate, Francia; 2016)
- Tubala Brass Week (Tafalla; España 2016)
- Asalto ao Castelo (Vimianzo; España 2015)
- Bandafolies (Limousin, Francia; 2013)
- Reperkusión (Ourense; España 2013)
- Pirineos Sur (Huesca; España 2012)
- Mundo Idiota (Madrid; España 2009)

== Performances with other musicians ==
- Los Gandules
- Despistaos
- Manolo Kabezabolo
- Juan Abarca (Mamá Ladilla)
- Sharif
- Fuethefirst
- Paco Pil
- Tako
- María Villalón
- Rupatrupa
- Viky Lafuente

== Discography ==
The tracks on their albums and their performances range from classical to hard rock such as Extremoduro. Their first two albums are covers, and from Punkis de conservatorio, are their own songs, very "punk and punkish, influenced by rock and ska".

The album Butibamba, produced during the Covid-19 pandemic, was the result of a crowdfunding campaign on the Verkami platform.

The song that gives name to the album "Butibamba", previous to the rest of the tracks, was created through the funding of "Girando Por Salas" -10th edition. Butibamba is captured in a videoclip.

== Awards ==
- Battle of charangas of Sabiñáñigo in Huesca (2011, 2012 and 2013)
- I National Contest of Charangas de Escucha in Teruel (2012)
- IV San Fermín txarangas contest in Pamplona (2012)
