= Calera y Chozas =

- Flag Coat of arms

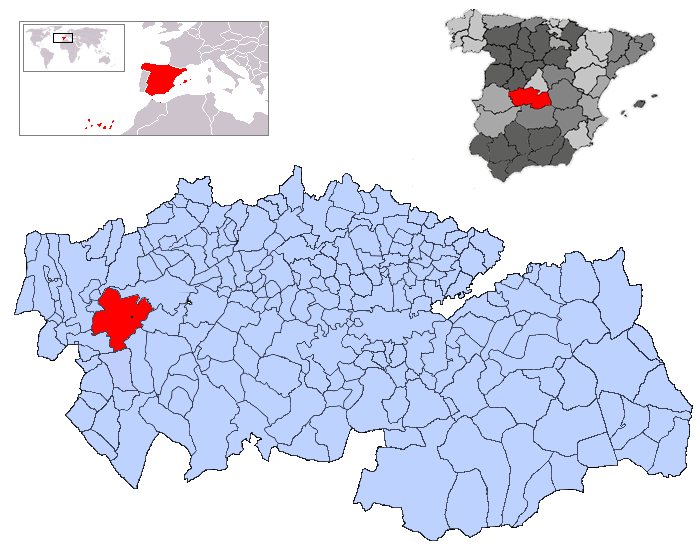

- Location Calera y Chozas (Spain)
- Coordinates: 39°53′N 4°59′W
- Country: Spain
- Autonomous community: Castile-La Mancha
- Province: Toledo
- Municipality: Calera y Chozas

Area
  - Total: 280 km^{2} (110 sq mi)
- Elevation: 392 m (1,286 ft)

Population (2025-01-01)
  - Total: 4,834
  - Density: 17/km^{2} (45/sq mi)
- Time zone: UTC+1 (CET)
  - Summer (DST): UTC+2 (CEST)
- Website: www.caleraychozas.com

Calera y Chozas is a municipality located in the province of Toledo, Castile-La Mancha, Spain. According to the 2025 census (INE), the municipality has a population of 4834 inhabitants.

== History ==
The earliest documented reference to Chozas is dated on Toledo to April 9, 1279, on the subject of the Bercial milestone, owned by the Hospital del Rey located on Burgos. On it the surrounding areas are noted as Torrejón, Tórtolas and Chozas del Serrano, among others.

The toponym of Calera is associated to an ancient limestone quarry linked to several small villages and the populated place Cobisa.

The definitive merger of Chozas de Talavera and La Calera was made on the first quarter of the 19th century due to the consequences that the War of Spanish Independence had on that area.

Madoz describes on his Diccionario geográfico-estadístico-histórico de España y sus posesiones de Ultramar La Calera:

CALERA (la): l. con ayunt. en la prov. y dióc. de Toledo (15 leg.), part. jud. del Puente del Arzobispo (3), aud. terr. de Madrid (23), c. g. de Castilla la Nueva: sit. sobre 4 pequeñas colinas que se encuentran en la llanura entre el r. Tajo y la carretera general de Estremadura; 1/2 leg. á la der. del r. y 1 á la izq. de la carretera, le baten los encontrados vientos del E. y O., con clima templado, y se padecen catarrales y tercianas. Tiene 650 casas que forman 27 calles, 2 plazas y 4 plazuelas; consistorial, en la cual hay un cuarto poco decente, que sirve de cárcel; escuela de niños, á la que concurren 120, y el maestro percibe 3,300 rs. de los fondos públicos; en defecto de escuela y maestra de niñas, hay 4 mujeres que se ocupan de la enseñanza de unas 60 á 80, mediante una retribucion proporcional; una igl. parr. con la advocacion de San Pedro Apóstol, curato de segundo ascenso y provision ordinaria, y en los afueras el cementerio. Confina el térm. por N. con el de Gamonal y Velada; E. Talavera de la Reina, Gamonal y el r. Tajo: S. el mismo r.; O. Alcolea, Alcañizo y Oropesa, á dist. de 1 leg. á 7/4, y comprende los desp. de Chozas y Covisa, los cas. de Tórtolas, en el que hay una ermita con la advocacion de Ntra. Sra. de los Remedios, Arco, Ciscarros, Pelavanegas, llamado vulgarmente Pedrovenegas, Laguna del Conejo y Silos; la casa de postas de la carretera; los montes poblados de Covisa, Tórtolas, Arco y Guitamo, Palomarejos, Quejigoso, Pelavanegas, Montenuevo, Dehesoncillo de los Girones, Continuo y Chozas: el r. Tajo deslinda su térm., como hemos dicho, de NE. á S. á 1/2 leg. de dist. y por espacio de 3 leg.: los arroyos de Majadillas, Valverde, Valpedregoso, Fuente-polo., Fuente del Piojo, Cobisa y Tórtolas, que todos van al Tajo, y las fuentes perennes de Arevalillo, Alijar, Monzarba, Arco, la Parrala, Pilon del Rey, Pilon viejo, Pilon de la Zarza, Fontanilla, Zorra, Prado y otras menos notables. El terreno es calizo en lo general, de primera, segunda y tercera clase: le cruza el camino ó carreterra de Madrid á Badajoz, á 1 leg. de dist. por el N.; otro que dirige á la cab. del part., se divide en dos á la salida del pueblo y conduce á Oropesa el ramal der., estos se hallan descuidados. El correo se recibe en Talavera de la Reina por baligero 3 veces á la semana. prod.: trigo, centeno, cebada, avena, garbanzos, vino, aceite, bellotas y algarrobas; se mantiene algun ganado lanar blanco y negro, todo riberiego, y se cria caza menor. imp.: 2 molinos harineros en el Tajo, llamados Silos y Ciscarros; el 1.° con tres piedras, y el 2.° con dos; 11 molinos de aceite en la pobl. los 3 de viga y los restantes de prensa. comercio: una tienda de lenceria y géneros de estambre, 3 tiendas de quincalla: se celebra feria los días 6, 7 y 8 de setiembre, la cual es de nueva concesion y solo concurren los ganados del pueblo y algunos de los inmediatos. pobl.: 692 vec., 2,598 alm. cap. prod.: 10.043,265 imp.: 261,581. contr.: segun el cálculo general de la prov. 74'48 por 0/0. presupuesto municipal: de 11 á 12,000 rs. del que se pagan 2,560 al secretario por su dotacion, y se cubre con 2,300 rs. producto de los bienes de propios, y lo demas por arbitrios, entre los cuales se cuenta el repartimiento vecinal.
Historia. En 27 de junio de 1809, con ocasion de presentirse una abauzada de caballeria nacional á la sazon que el ejército francés se hallaba inmediato, los paisanos se alborotaron, tocaron las campanas á bando, y acometieron á unos soldados franceses que habían quedado rezagados. Este proceder irritó en términos al duque de Bellune, que mandó incendiar el pueblo, haciendo permanecer cuerpos enteros para avivar el fuego y pasar á cuchillo á cuantos por enfermos ó descuidados no pudieron huir. En memoria de tan fatal acontecimiento, se celebran en el mismo dia de cada año solemnes exequias por las 20 víctimas de todas clases y condiciones que se cree fueron las sacrificadas. Menos estrepitoso el segundo hecho tuvo mejores resultados. El 3 de octubre de 1833, se levantó una partida carlista en Talavera, bajo las órdenes de un tal Gonzalez, administrador de correos, que se apoderó de los caudales públicos, encarceló á los liberales y contando con una estensa ramificacion en el pais, se dirigió á Calera con el objeto de proclamar á Carlos V, pero el alc. auxiliado eficazmente por el comandante de realistas, exigieron al González la órden que le autorizaba para tal proclamacion. Este acto de firmeza del espresado alc. fué bastante á libertar al pueblo de un conflicto y á deshacer el medio de una conspiracion que pudó ser fatal al trono de Doña Isabel II; pues los capitaneados por González se dispersaron en diferentes direcciones sin volver á reunirse.

— (Madoz 1846, pp. 289–290)

He also describes Chozas de Talavera:

Chozas de Talavera: desp. en la prov. de Toledo, part. jud. del Puente del Arzobispo, térm. de Calera, el cap. prod. está calculado oficialmente en 103,089 rs., é incluido en el total asignado á su matriz.

— (Madoz 1846, pp. 345)

== Geography ==
The municipal area of Calera y Chozas forms part of the historic comarca of El Alcor, grouped into the natural comarca of Talavera de la Reina.

Administratively it is part of La Campana de Oropesa, traditionally grouped into the natural comarca of Campo Arañuelo.

Calera y Chozas limits with the municipalities of Alcañizo, Oropesa, Velada, Talavera de la Reina, Las Herencias, Alcolea de Tajo and Aldeanueva de Barbarroya.

== Demographics ==
Historical population
Year	Pop.	±%
1900	3,371	—
1910	3,646	+8.2%
1920	3,497	−4.1%
1930	3,955	+13.1%
1940	3,488	−11.8%
1950	3,304	−5.3%
1960	5,682	+72.0%
1970	4,400	−22.6%
1981	3,704	−15.8%
1991	3,565	−3.8%
2001	3,709	+4.0%
2011	4,690	+26.4%
2021	4,641	−1.0%
2023	4,754	+2.4%
Source: INE

== Villages ==
- Calera y Chozas
- Alberche del Caudillo, a village named after the Alberche River located 4 km away from the main town. It was established by the Instituto Nacional de Colonización in the General Franco era.

== Sources ==
- Madoz, Pascual (1846). "Calera (La)". Diccionario geográfico-estadístico-histórico de España y sus posesiones de Ultramar. Vol. V. Madrid.
