= Manzanares, Ciudad Real =

Manzanares
- Municipality
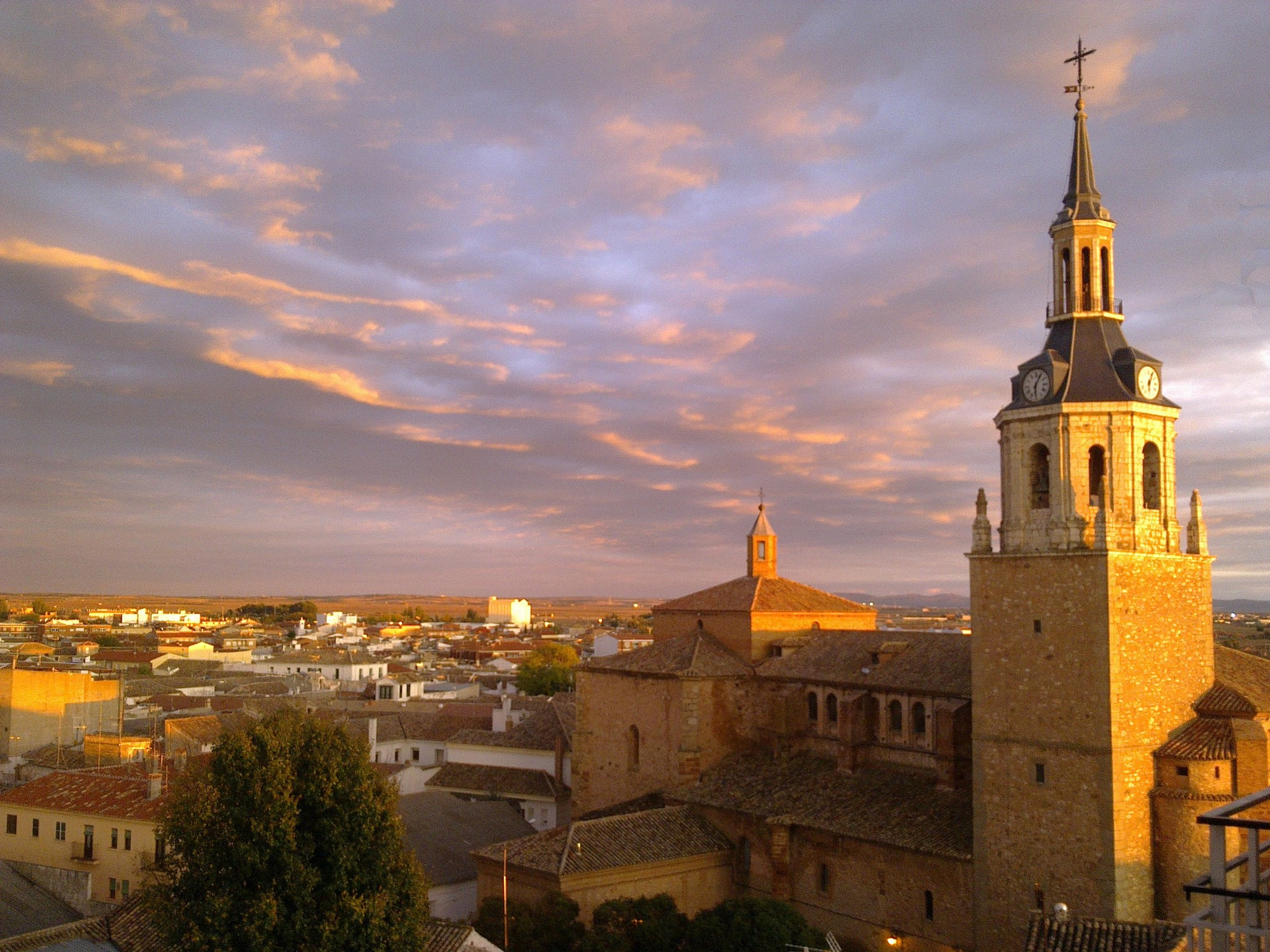
- Sunset in Manzanares

- Coat of arms

- Location in Spain
- Coordinates: 38°59′47″N 3°22′23″W
- Country: Spain
- Autonomous community: Castilla–La Mancha
- Province: Ciudad Real

Area
  - Total: 474 km^{2} (183 sq mi)
- Elevation: 654 m (2,146 ft)

Population (2025-01-01)
  - Total: 17,728
  - Density: 37.4/km^{2} (96.9/sq mi)
- Demonym(s): Manzanareño, Manzanareña
- Time zone: UTC+1 (CET)
  - Summer (DST): UTC+2 (CEST)
- Postal code: 13200
- Website: Official website

Manzanares is a municipality of Spain located in the province of Ciudad Real, Castilla–La Mancha. It had a population of 18,924 as of 2014. It is located on the A-4 road route.

== History ==
Historical research suggests that the populated place did not exist before 1240. A commandery (encomienda) centre of the Order of Calatrava was created in Manzanares in the second half of the 13th century. The Calatravan holding remained contiguous to the lands of the Order of Santiago throughout the late middle ages. Population took off in the 14th century, and walls were built.

The village of Llanos del Caudillo, established by the Instituto Nacional de Colonización in the 1950s and formerly depending from Manzanares, became a municipality in its own right in the 1990s.

== Bibliography ==
- Almagro Vidal, Clara (2008). "Población, encomienda, territorio: Manzanares a finales del siglo XV". En la España Medieval. 31. Madrid: Ediciones Complutense: 123–150. ISSN 0214-3038.
