= Valenzuela de Calatrava =

Coordinates: 38°51′N 3°46′W

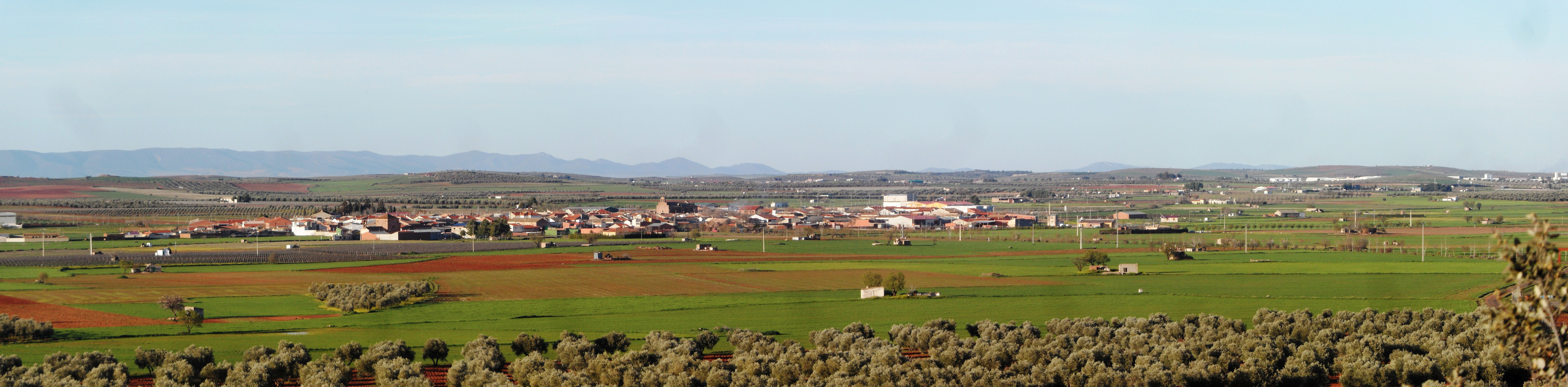
Panoramic view of Valenzuela de Calatrava

Coat of arms of Valenzuela de Calatrava

Valenzuela de Calatrava is a municipality in Ciudad Real Province, Castile-La Mancha, Spain. It has a population of 802.

== Villages ==
- Valenzuela de Calatrava, Postal Code 13279
- Los Mirones, Postal Code 13739. A village established by the Instituto Nacional de Colonización
