= Llanos del Caudillo =

Coordinates: 39°07′05″N 3°21′07″W

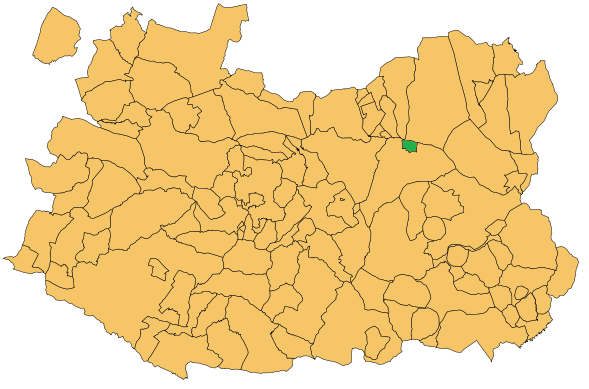
Location of Llanos del Caudillo

Flag of Llanos del Caudillo

Coat of arms of Llanos del Caudillo

Llanos del Caudillo is a municipality in Ciudad Real, Castile-La Mancha, Spain. It has a population of 692.

== History ==
Llanos del Caudillo was founded by colonist families in the 1950s, subsidized by the Instituto Nacional de Colonización of the Spanish government.

It was first established as an Entidad Local (Local Entity) carved out of Manzanares municipal term.

The term 'Caudillo' in its name refers to Francisco Franco, the general who ruled over Spain as a military dictator from 1939 until his death in 1975.
