= Sodeto =

Coordinates: 41°53′24.61″N 0°15′10.52″W

- village
- Interactive map of Sodeto
- Country: Spain
- Autonomous community: Aragon
- Province: Huesca
- Comarca: Monegros
- Municipality: Alberuela de Tubo
- Elevation: 330 m (1,080 ft)

Population (2012)
  - Total: around 250
- Time zone: UTC+1 (CET)
  - Summer (DST): UTC+2 (CEST)

Sodeto is a village in the municipality of Alberuela de Tubo, Huesca, Spain. The village was created in 1950 by the Instituto Nacional de Colonización y Desarrollo Rural (INCDR), in English: National Institute of Rural Development and Colonization. The INCDR was the administrative entity that was established by the Spanish dictatorship in October 1939, shortly after the end of the Spanish Civil War, in order to repopulate certain areas of Spain or to bring infertile and arid areas into agricultural production. Sodeto is thus is a planned community. Its lands formerly belonged to the Duke of Villahermosa. The population of the village was once about 400, but is now down to about 250.

Early in 2012, the village's homeowner association won the largest prize to date in the Spanish Christmas Lottery drawing, a sum of about 750 million Euros. A single ticket was worth 100,000 Euros. Every resident save one had purchased at least one ticket. This feat received a lot of media attention and journalists swamped the village. A year later however, press reports indicate that the enormous amount of prize money didn't make the inhabitants that much happier.
