= Ejea de los Caballeros =

Ejea de los Caballeros Exeya d'os Caballers (Aragonese)
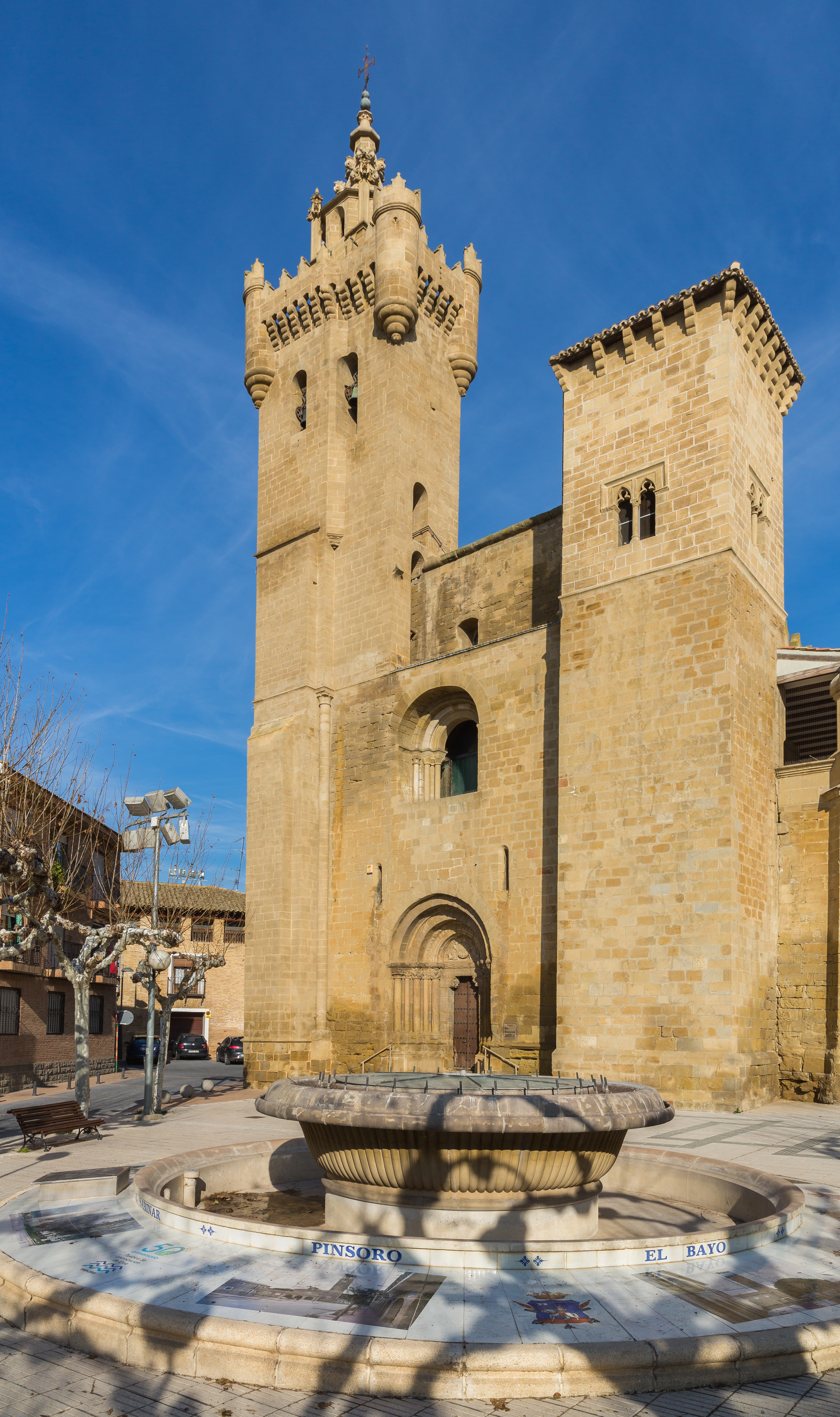
- Church of the Saint Savior

- Coat of arms
- Nickname: Ejea
- Location in Spain Ejea de los Caballeros (Spain) Ejea de los Caballeros (Europe)
- Coordinates: 42°7′45″N 1°8′14″W
- Country: Spain
- Autonomous community: Aragon
- Province: Zaragoza
- Comarca: Cinco Villas
- Villages: Ejea de los Caballeros, Bardenas, El Bayo, El Sabinar, Farasdués, Pinsoro, Rivas, Santa Anastasia, Valareña

Government
  - Type: Mayor–council
  - Body: Ayuntamiento de Ejea de los Caballeros
  - Mayor: Teresa Ladrero (PSOE)

Area
  - Total: 609.92 km^{2} (235.49 sq mi)
- Elevation: 318 m (1,043 ft)

Population (2025-01-01)
  - Total: 17,129
  - Density: 28.084/km^{2} (72.737/sq mi)
- Demonyms: ejeano (m), ejeana (f)
- Postal code: 50600
- Website: www.ejea.es

Ejea de los Caballeros (Spanish: [eˈxea ðe los kaβaˈʎeɾos]; Aragonese: Exeya d'os Caballers), commonly known simply as Ejea, is a town and municipality in the province of Zaragoza, part of the autonomous community of Aragon, Spain. It is one of the five main towns in the Comarca de las Cinco Villas (lit. 'Shire of the Five Villages'), along with Sos del Rey Católico, Uncastillo, Sádaba, and Tauste.

The town became part of the medieval Kingdom of Aragon in 1105 during the Spanish Reconquista, as Muslim rule in the region was receding.

== Main sights ==
The town retains many medieval buildings, including:

- The Romanesque church of Santa María de la Corona. It was renewed in 1649–1650.
- The church of San Salvador, of the Romanesque-Gothic transition style. It has a 16th-century portal with Romanesque sculptures.
- The church of our Lady the Virgin of the Olive (Nuestra Señora la Virgen de la Oliva), renovated in 1765 over a pre-existing medieval building.

== Villages ==
The municipality of Ejea de los Caballeros comprises nine different centres of population:

- Ejea de los Caballeros
- Bardenas
- El Bayo
- El Sabinar
- Farasdués
- Pinsoro
- Rivas
- Santa Anastasia
- Valareña

Rivas and Farasdués are two historic villages that have been dependencies of Ejea for decades. The other six centres were built in the 1950s and 1960s in order to settle inhabitants and farmers to grow irrigation crops, following the construction of the Yesa Reservoir and Bardenas irrigation channel that brought water to these villages, among others (Sádaba, Tauste, and others).

== Culture ==
The main local festival honours the Virgin of the Olive, the local saint. In June, there is also a medieval celebration for the patron saint, Saint John the Baptist.

Another local festival commemorates The Vote Day (January 14), an event during the Black Plague in which the townsfolk voted for the bringing of the Virgin of the Olive across the town to worship her. The plague is purported to have ended in the town that day.

== Notable people ==
- Alberto Zapater – footballer
- Alberto Soro – footballer who plays for Granada CF
- Artistas del Gremio – brass band

== Twin towns ==
- Marmande, France
- Portogruaro, Italy

== See also ==
- List of municipalities in Zaragoza
