= Vilches, Spain =

Vilches
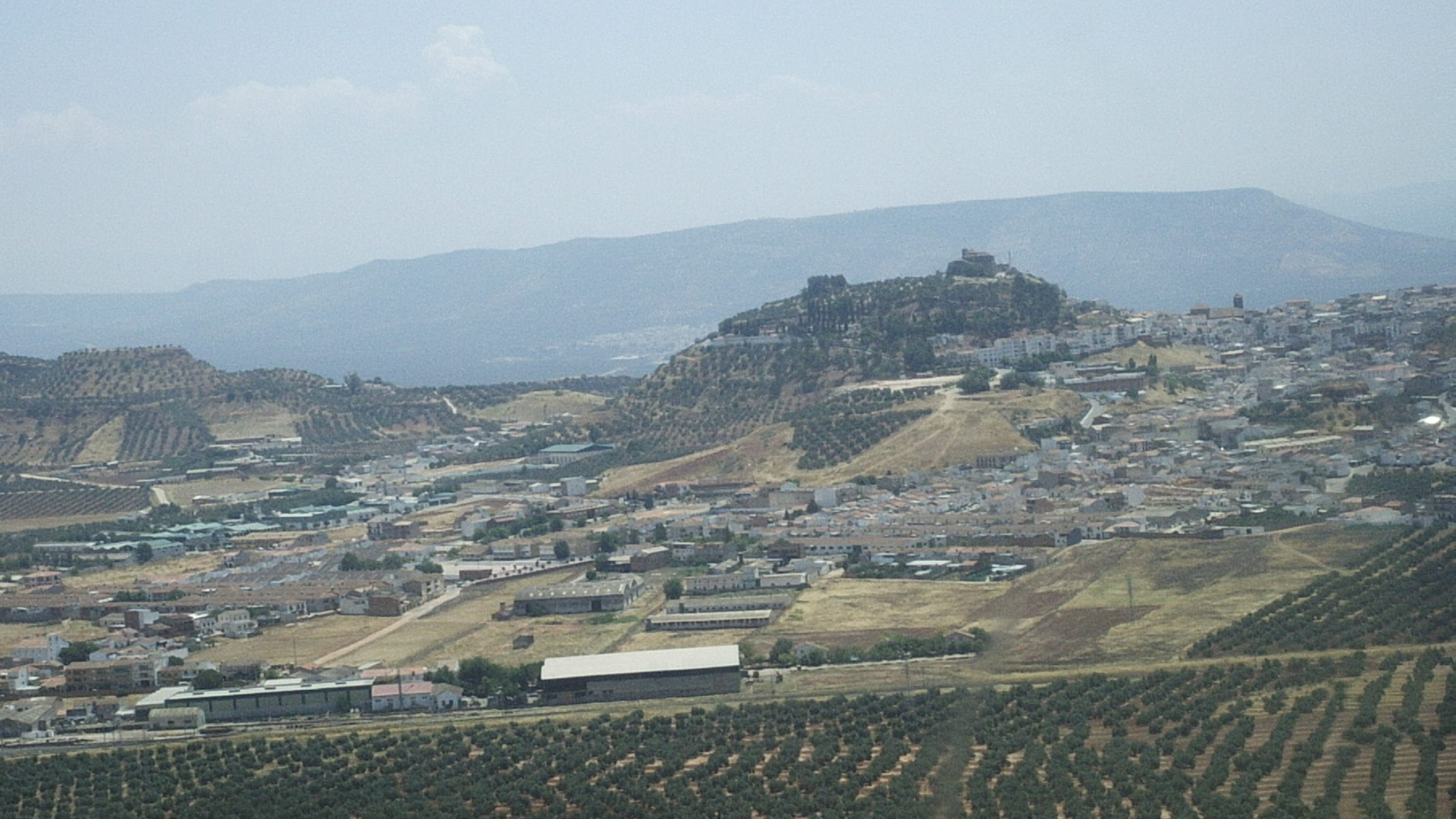

- Flag Coat of arms

- Location in the Province of Jaén Vilches (Andalusia) Vilches (Spain)
- Coordinates: 38°12′N 3°30′W
- Country: Spain
- Autonomous community: Andalusia
- Province: Jaén

Area
  - Total: 273.12 km^{2} (105.45 sq mi)
- Elevation: 548 m (1,798 ft)

Population (2025-01-01)
  - Total: 4,191
  - Density: 15.34/km^{2} (39.74/sq mi)
- Time zone: UTC+1 (CET)
  - Summer (DST): UTC+2 (CEST)
- Website: www.vilches.com

Vilches is a municipality in the province of Jaén, Spain.

== Vilches airports ==
The nearest airport is GRX - Granada located 114.9 km south of Vilches. Other airports nearby include GRX - Granada Armilla (119.0 km south), ODB - Cordoba (124.9 km west), LEI - Almeria (180.6 km south east), AGP - Malaga (191.0 km south west).

== Nearby towns ==
Cabrerizas (4.7 km south west), Hortalanca (5.7 km north east), Arquillos (6.1 km east), Isabela (6.9 km north west), Arquillos el Viejo (6.9 km south east), Estacion de Vadollano (8.6 km south west).

== Villages ==
- Vilches
- Guadalén del Caudillo, 38°08′31″N 3°30′24″W, a village established by the Instituto Nacional de Colonización in the Franco era.
- Miraelrío

== See also ==
- List of municipalities in Jaén
