= Instituto Nacional de Colonización =

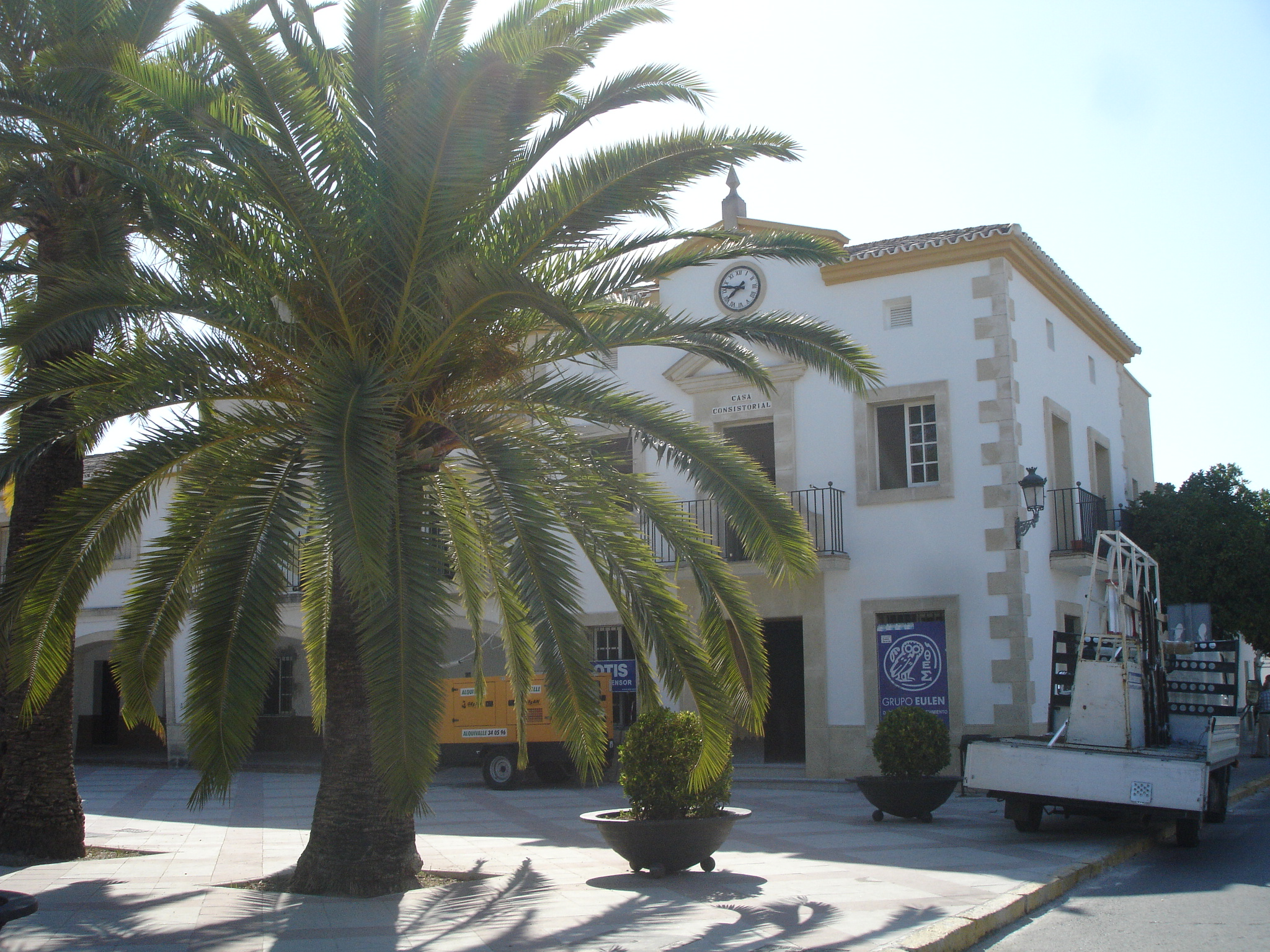
Town Hall in Guadalcacín, formerly Guadalcacín del Caudillo, one of the villages established by the Instituto Nacional de Colonización in 1952

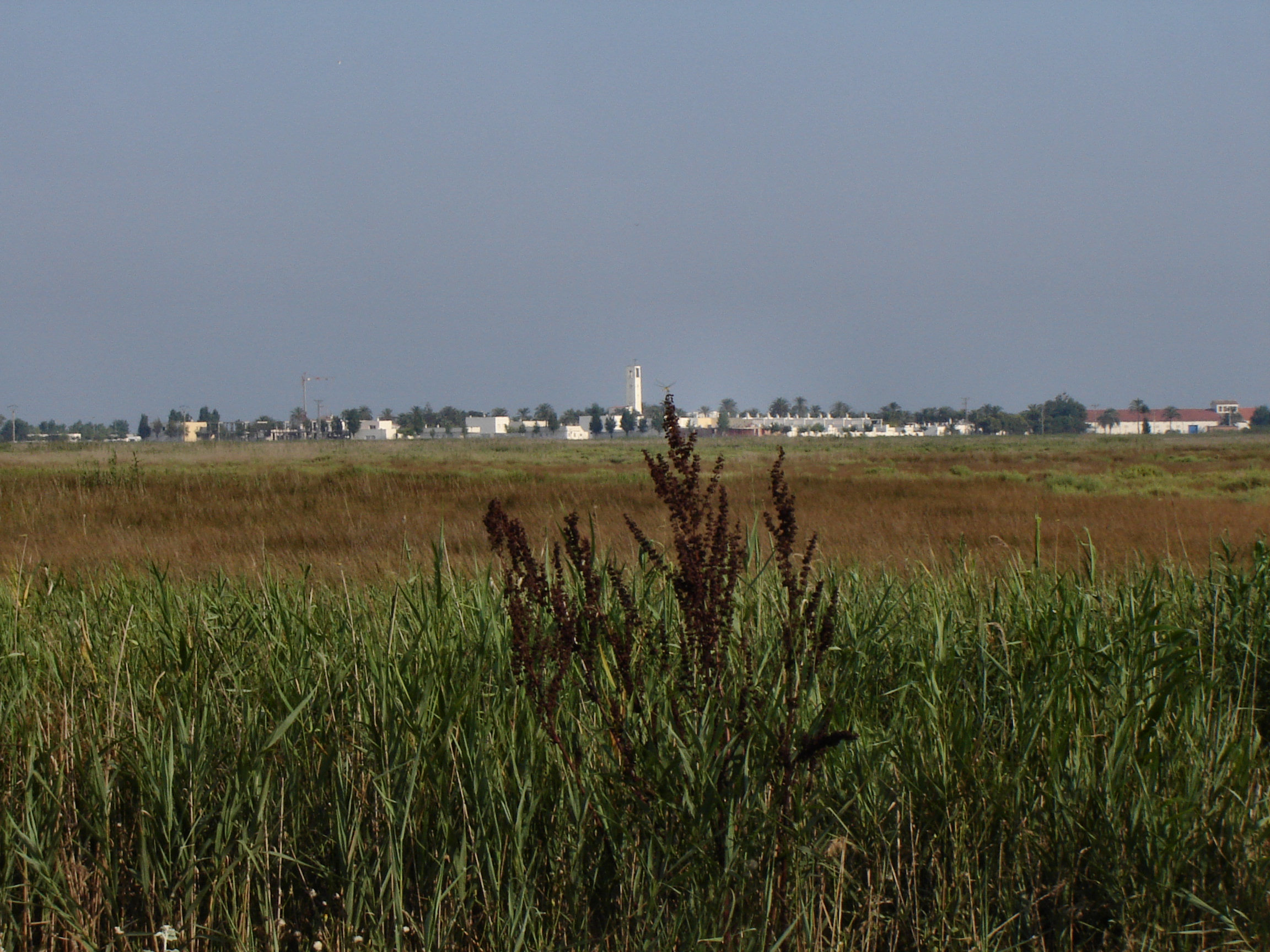
El Poble Nou Del Delta, a village built after drying wetlands of the Ebro river delta.

Instituto Nacional de Colonización logo

The Instituto Nacional de Colonización y Desarrollo Rural (English: National Institute of Rural Development and Colonization) was the administrative entity that was established by the Spanish State in October 1939, shortly after the end of the Spanish Civil War, in order to repopulate certain areas of Spain. This entity depended from the Ministry of Agriculture and it sought to alleviate the effects of the devastation caused by the three years of civil war.

The Instituto acquired land which it transferred to the villagers under different conditions according to the area and the levels of poverty of the tenants. The tenants eventually were expected to pay a small sum that allowed them to become the future owners of the land they tilled.

This ambitious plan led to the establishment of new villages in different parts of Spain, some of which still survive. The Instituto reached a height of activity and influence during the first two decades of Francoist Spain, but after the Plan de Estabilización in 1959, and the subsequent Planes de Desarrollo, its autarkic goals and ideals became outdated. By 1971 the word "Colonization" had stopped being politically correct and the name of the entity was changed to Instituto Nacional de Reforma y Desarrollo Agrario (IRYDA).

== Goals and results ==
The Instituto's main goal was to increase agricultural production in Spain by devoting more land surface to agriculture. Priority was given to the development of new irrigated areas in arid and semi-arid zones. This goal was very effective for the propaganda purposes of the new regime and triumphalistic claims were made that the colonization measures would increase self-sufficiency. But often irrigation was opposed to the traditional and sustainable methods of dryland farming that were ecologically more in tune with locally available resources in fragile environments.

Although the plans of the IRYDA were implemented with the avowed goal of a "better management of natural resources of the country" (Spanish: "mejor aprovechamiento y conservación de los recursos naturales en aguas y tierras"), the agricultural policies implemented were sometimes not mindful of the environment, leading to salinization of the terrain and to soil erosion in some areas. Some of the villages that were established in former wetlands or in chronic drought areas were later abandoned, along with the lands that surrounded them and that had formerly been earmarked for agriculture.

== List of villages ==
Many of the new villages were given a name related to the nearest river or even a name with an explicit reference to the Caudillo in order to cast a benevolent image of Francisco Franco, like Llanos del Caudillo, Villafranco del Delta, a village in the Montsià comarca nowadays rechristened as El Poblenou del Delta or Isla Mayor near Seville, the former Villafranco del Guadalquivir.

Some of these new settlements were built to house the families whose houses were flooded when their ancestral village was submerged by the waters of one of the many reservoirs built during the development plans of the 1950s and 1960s, like Loriguilla, Mequinensa and Faió (Fayón), among others. Others were renovations and repopulations of previously extant but abandoned towns.

- Andalucía
  - Guadalimar del Caudillo, in Lupión, Province of Jaén
  - Guadalén del Caudillo, in Vilches, Province of Jaén
  - Agrupación de Mogón, in Villacarrillo, Province of Jaén
  - Arroturas, in Villacarrillo, Province of Jaén
  - Agrupación de Santo Tomé (also known as Montiel) in Santo Tomé, Province of Jaén
  - Veracruz de Úbeda, in Úbeda, Province of Jaén
  - Solana de Torralba, in Úbeda, Province of Jaén
  - Valdecazorla, in Cazorla, Province of Jaén
  - San Miguel, in Úbeda, Province of Jaén
  - Donadio, in Úbeda, Province of Jaén
  - Puente del Obispo, in Baeza, Province of Jaén
  - Sotogordo, in Mancha Real, Province of Jaén
  - Vados de Torralba, in Villatorres, Province of Jaén
  - Campillo del Río, in Torreblascopedro, Province of Jaén
  - Miraelrío, in Vilches, Province of Jaén
  - Vegas de Santa María - Barrio de Linares, in Linares, Province of Jaén
  - Espeluy expansion, in Espeluy, Province of Jaén
  - La Quintería, in Villanueva de la Reina, Province of Jaén
  - Los Villares de Andújar, in Andújar, Province of Jaén
  - Vegas de Triana, in Andújar, Province of Jaén
  - Llanos del Sotillo, in Andújar, Province of Jaén
  - La Ropera, in Andújar, Province of Jaén
  - Poblado de San Julián, in Marmolejo, Province of Jaén
  - Bembézar del Caudillo, in Hornachuelos, Province of Córdoba
  - Villafranco del Guadalhorce, in Alhaurín el Grande, Province of Málaga
  - Guadalcacín (formerly Guadalcacín del Caudillo), in Jerez de la Frontera, Province of Cádiz
  - Isla Mayor (formerly Villafranco del Guadalquivir), in the Province of Sevilla
  - El Viar (formerly El Viar del Caudillo), in Alcalá del Río, Province of Sevilla
  - Peñuelas, in Láchar, Province of Granada
  - Fuensanta, in Pinos Puente, Province of Granada
  - Loreto, in Moraleda de Safayona, Province of Granada
  - Romilla la Nueva, in Chauchina, Province of Granada
  - El Chaparral, in Albolote, Province of Granada
  - Buenavista (known as Burrianca), in Alhama de Granada, Province of Granada
  - San Isidro, in Níjar, Province of Almeria
  - Campohermoso, in Níjar, Province of Almeria
  - Atochares, in Níjar, Province of Almeria
  - Puebloblanco, in Níjar, Province of Almeria
- Aragón
  - Camporreal, in Sos del Rey Católico, Province of Zaragoza
  - Alera, in Sádaba, Province of Zaragoza
  - Bárdena del Caudillo, in Ejea de los Caballeros, Province of Zaragoza
  - Valareña, in Ejea de los Caballeros, Province of Zaragoza
  - El Bayo, in Ejea de los Caballeros, Province of Zaragoza
  - Santa Anastasia, in Ejea de los Caballeros, Province of Zaragoza
  - Pinsoro, in Ejea de los Caballeros, Province of Zaragoza
  - Valareña, in Ejea de los Caballeros, Province of Zaragoza
  - El Sabinar, in Ejea de los Caballeros, Province of Zaragoza
  - Ontinar de Salz, in Zuera, Province of Zaragoza
  - Puilatos, in Zuera, Province of Zaragoza, (demolished)
  - Sancho Abarca, in Tauste, Province of Zaragoza
  - Santa Engracia, in Tauste, Province of Zaragoza
  - Valsalada in Almudévar, Huesca
  - Artasona del Llano in Almudévar, Province of Huesca
  - San Jorge in Almudévar, Province of Huesca
  - El Temple, in Gurrea de Gállego, Province of Huesca
  - Sodeto, in Alberuela de Tubo, Province of Huesca
  - Valmuel (formerly Alpeñés del Caudillo), in Alcañiz, Province of Teruel
  - Puigmoreno (formerly Campillo de Franco), in Alcañiz, Province of Teruel
- Castilla La Mancha
  - Alberche del Caudillo, in Calera y Chozas, Province of Toledo
  - Talavera la Nueva, in Talavera de la Reina, Province of Toledo
  - Llanos del Caudillo, in the Province of Ciudad Real
  - Cinco Casas, in the Province of Ciudad Real
  - Consolación (formerly Villanueva de Franco), in Valdepeñas, Province of Ciudad Real
  - Pueblo Nuevo del Bullaque, Province of Ciudad Real
  - Santa Quiteria, Province of Ciudad Real
  - Bazán, Province of Ciudad Real
  - Los Mirones, in Valenzuela de Calatrava, Province of Ciudad Real
  - Cañada de Agra, Province of Albacete
  - Mingogil, Province of Albacete
  - Nava de Campana, in Hellín, Province of Albacete
  - Aguas Nuevas, Province of Albacete
- Castilla-León
  - Águeda del Caudillo, in Ciudad Rodrigo, Province of Salamanca
  - Cascón de la Nava, Province of Palencia
  - Foncastín, in Rueda, Province of Valladolid
  - San Bernardo, Province of Valladolid
  - Guma, Province of Burgos
- Catalonia
  - Poblenou del Delta (formerly Villafranco del Delta), in Amposta, Province of Tarragona
  - Gimenells, now Gimenells i el Pla de la Font, Province of Lleida
  - El Pla de la Font, now Gimenells i el Pla de la Font, Province of Lleida
  - Sucs, Province of Lleida, was an abandoned town, renovated and repopulated under the Franco plan
- Extremadura
  - Docenario, in La Serena, Province of Badajoz
  - Gévora (formerly Gévora del Caudillo), in the Province of Badajoz
  - Guadiana del Caudillo in the Province of Badajoz
  - Novelda del Guadiana, in Badajoz, Province of Badajoz
  - Pueblonuevo del Guadiana, in the Province of Badajoz
  - Villafranco del Guadiana, in Badajoz, Province of Badajoz
  - Alagón del Río (formerly Alagón del Caudillo), in Galisteo, Province of Cáceres
  - El Batán, in the Province of Cáceres
  - Puebla de Argeme, in the Province of Cáceres
  - Rincón del Obispo, in the Province of Cáceres
  - San Gil, in the Province of Cáceres
  - Tiétar (formerly Tiétar del Caudillo), Province of Cáceres
  - Vegaviana, in the Province of Cáceres
- Valencian Community
  - San Isidro
  - Benaixeve
  - El Realengo, Crevillent (Province of Alicante)
  - San Antonio de Benagéber (Sant Antoni de Benaixeve)
  - Sant Isidre de Benaixeve
  - Tous
  - Cortitxelles
- Navarre
  - Figarol
  - Rada
  - Gabarderal
  - El Boyeral (abandoned)
  - San Isidro del Pinar

== See also ==
- ICONA
- Francoist Spain
- Sustainable agriculture
