= Lupión =

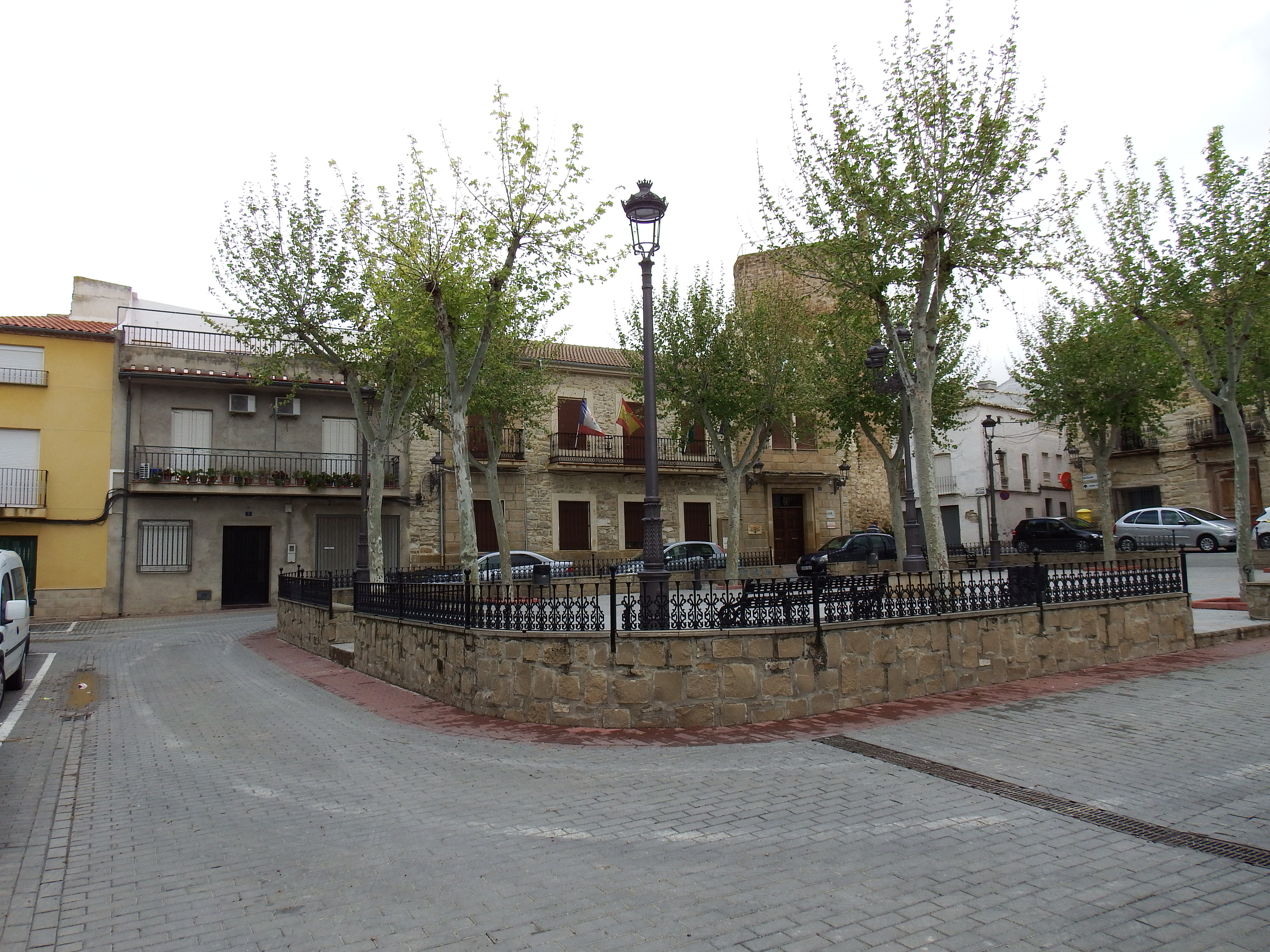

- Flag Coat of arms

- Location in the Province of Jaén Lupión (Andalusia) Lupión (Spain)
- Coordinates: 38°00′N 3°33′W
- Country: Spain
- Autonomous community: Andalusia
- Province: Jaén

Area
  - Total: 24.33 km^{2} (9.39 sq mi)
- Elevation: 500 m (1,600 ft)

Population (2025-01-01)
  - Total: 801
  - Density: 32.9/km^{2} (85.3/sq mi)
- Time zone: UTC+1 (CET)
  - Summer (DST): UTC+2 (CEST)
- Website: www.lupion.es

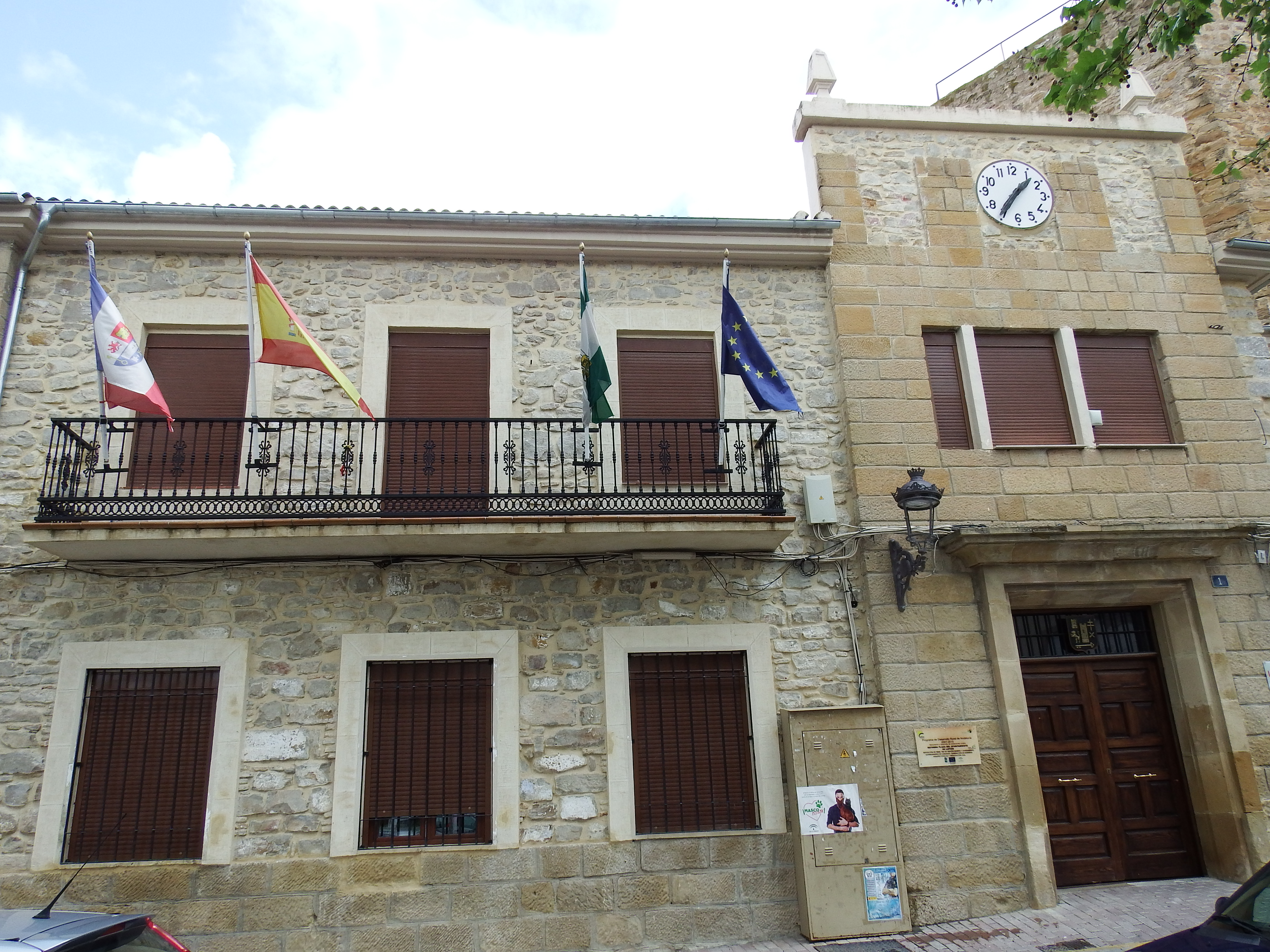
Lupión Town Hall

Lupión is a municipality in the province of Jaén, Andalusia, Spain.

== Villages ==
- Lupión
- Guadalimar, 38°01′15″N 3°36′45″W, a village established by the Instituto Nacional de Colonización in the Franco era located 6 km NW of Lupión.

== See also ==
- List of municipalities in Jaén
