= Alberuela de Tubo =

Coordinates: 41°54′N 0°12′W

Alberuela de Tubo Abaruela de Tubo
- municipality
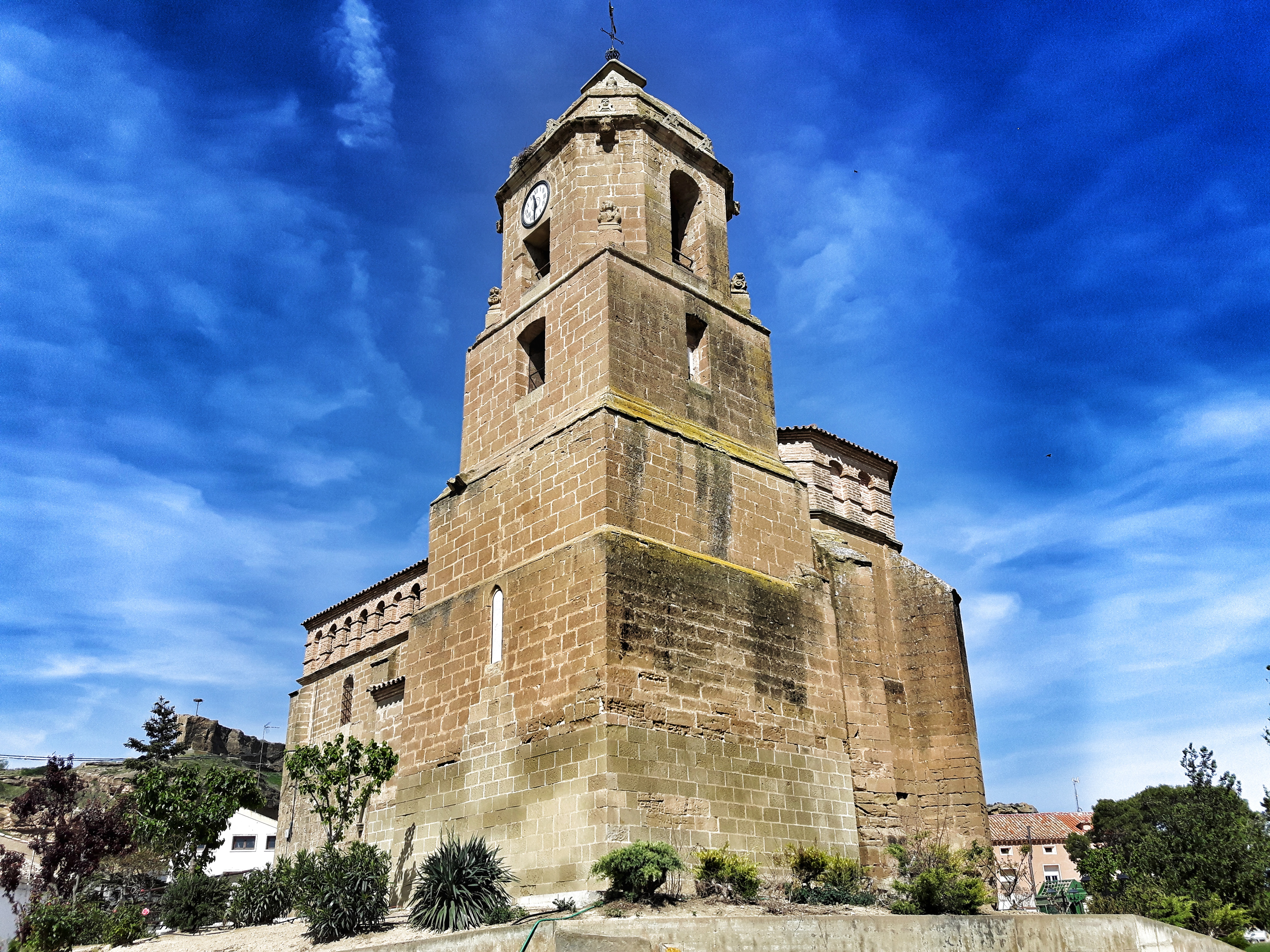
- Interactive map of Alberuela de Tubo
- Country: Spain
- Autonomous community: Aragon
- Province: Huesca
- Comarca: Monegros

Area
  - Total: 20 km^{2} (7.7 sq mi)
- Elevation: 352 m (1,155 ft)

Population (2025-01-01)
  - Total: 270
  - Density: 14/km^{2} (35/sq mi)
- Time zone: UTC+1 (CET)
  - Summer (DST): UTC+2 (CEST)

Alberuela de Tubo (Aragonese Abaruela de Tubo) is a municipality located in the province of Huesca, Aragon, Spain. According to the 2009 census (INE), the municipality has a population of 358 inhabitants.

== Villages ==
- Sodeto, created by the IRYDA in lands formerly belonging to the Duke of Villahermosa.

== See also ==
- List of municipalities in Huesca
