= Galisteo, Cáceres =

Coordinates: 39°59′N 6°16′W

Galisteo, Spain
- municipality
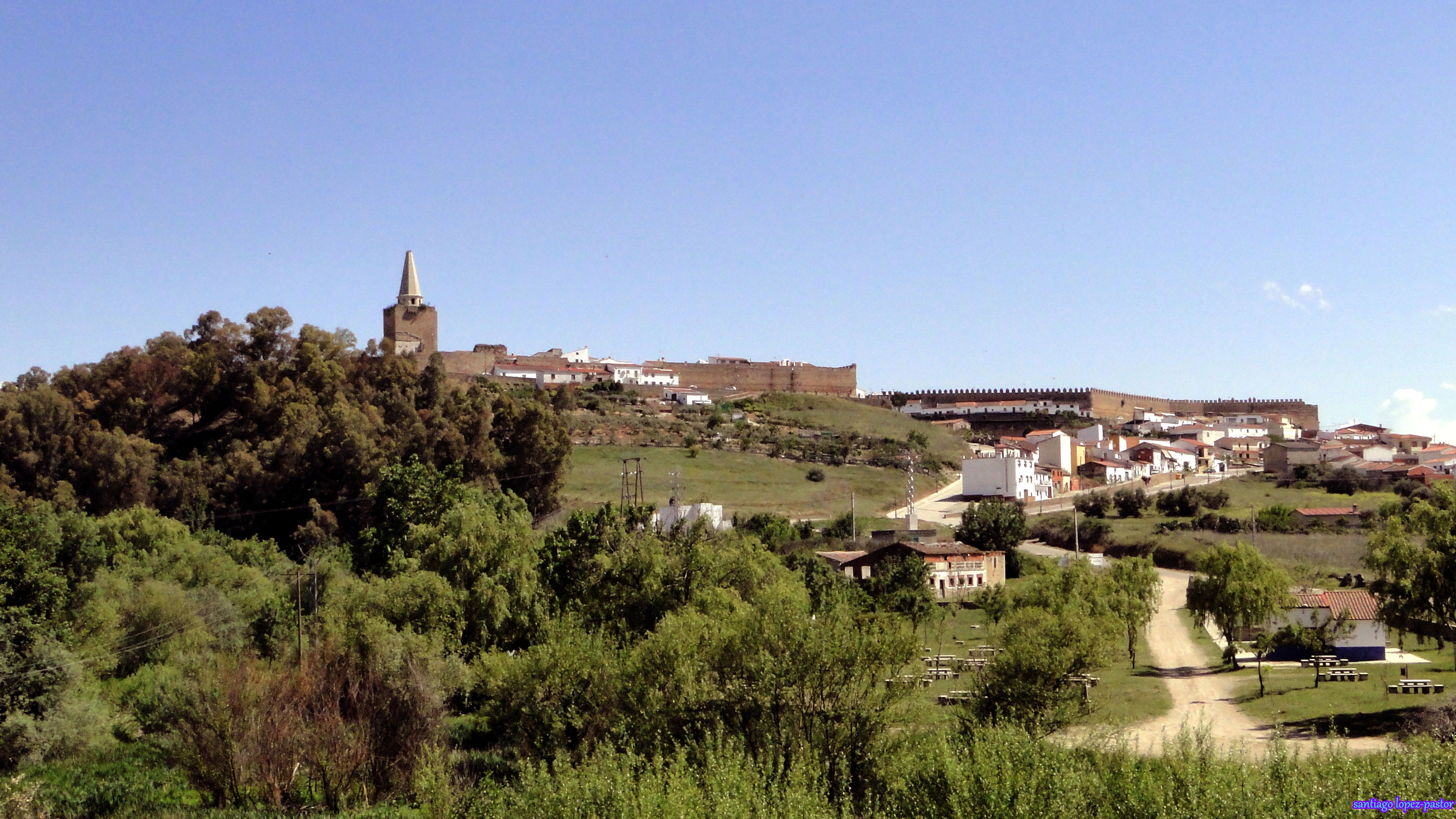

- Flag Coat of arms

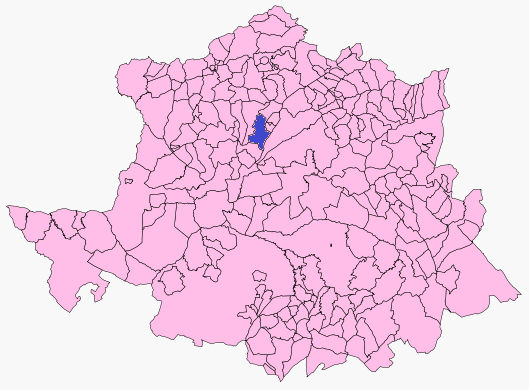
- Map of Galisteo
- Country: Spain
- Autonomous community: Extremadura
- Province: Cáceres
- Municipality: Galisteo

Area
  - Total: 79 km^{2} (31 sq mi)
- Elevation: 346 m (1,135 ft)

Population (2025-01-01)
  - Total: 849
  - Density: 11/km^{2} (28/sq mi)
- Time zone: UTC+1 (CET)
  - Summer (DST): UTC+2 (CEST)
- Website: https://www.galisteo.es

Galisteo is a municipality located in the province of Cáceres, Extremadura, Spain. According to the 2006 census (INE), the municipality has a population of 2001 inhabitants.

Alagón del Río, a town founded in the 1950s by the Instituto Nacional de Colonización within Galisteo municipal limits, became a separate municipality in 2009.

== See also ==
- List of municipalities in Cáceres
