= Pinsoro =

Coordinates: 42.1952°N 1.3360°W

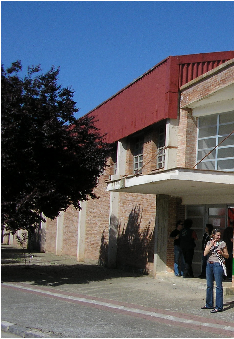
Pinsoro sports hall

Pinsoro is a village situated to the northwest of the city of Zaragoza in northeastern Spain. The population is approximately 800. This village is located within the Ejea de los Caballeros municipal term.

== History ==
Pinsoro was founded by colonist families in 1962, subsidized by the Instituto Nacional de Colonización of the Spanish government. Since the moment of its foundation till nowadays, the village hasn't stopped growing economically. Today, Pinsoro has a lot of shops and supermarkets, a medical centre, two theaters, an agriculture factory and more facilities.

In May 2012, this village celebrated its 50th anniversary.

== Tourism ==
The places to visit at this village are directly connected with nature:

- El Lagunazo de Moncayuelo: a lake in the outskirts of Pinsoro. A lot of bird species live here, and camping and eating is allowed.
- "El Cierzo" Hotel: in the centre of the village. This hotel has some rooms for a rest.
- Pinsoro Church: the oldest building in the town.
- Pinsoro Arch: in the past this was the entrance to the village.
- Village Bullring
- Sport facilities: there is a swimming pool, a frontenis coach and a sports hall.

== Astronomy ==
Pinsoro's observatory is a useful place to see astronomical phenomena.

== Festivals ==
- San Isidro Festivals: in spring, the week of 15 May.
- San Mateo Festivals: the most important ones in Pinsoro. These festivals take place in summer, the week of 21 September.
