= Alagón del Río =

- Flag Coat of arms
- Interactive map of Alagón del Río
- Coordinates: 39°58′24″N 6°19′02″W
- Country: Spain
- Autonomous community: Extremadura
- Province: Cáceres
- Comarca: Vegas del Alagón

Government
  - Mayor: Juan Carlos Guerrero López (IDAR)

Area
  - Total: 13.82 km^{2} (5.34 sq mi)

Population (2025-01-01)
  - Total: 919
  - Density: 66.5/km^{2} (172/sq mi)
- Time zone: UTC+1 (CET)
  - Summer (DST): UTC+2 (CEST)

Alagón del Río is a municipality located in the province of Cáceres, Extremadura, Spain. According to the 2013 census (INE), the municipality has a population of 889 inhabitants. Alagón del Río became independent from Galisteo in November 2009.

== History ==
=== Colonisation settlement ===
Alagón del Caudillo was created as a settlement village, mainly to accommodate the population of Granadilla and Martinebrón which, with the construction of the Gabriel y Galán reservoir would be buried under the waters. However, over time, people from different origins began to settle here. Next to Alagón, other colonisation settlements were built, such as Valrío, El Batán, Puebla de Argeme and Rincón del Obispo. On 18 March 1955, the Decree of the General Colonisation Plan for the Gabriel y Galán irrigation area was approved and published in the Official State Gazette on 16 April. The National Colonisation Institute was responsible for drawing up the colonisation plan in accordance with the law. The necessary infrastructure works were then started. The village was planned in 1957 by the architect José Subirana Rodríguez.

On the one hand, major hydraulic works were carried out, such as the Gabriel y Galán reservoir (whose construction was already advanced), the Valdeobispo dam, canals and networks of irrigation channels. On the other hand, work began to irrigate and colonise the area. From 1957 onwards, the pastureland on which the new village and the cultivation plots were to be located was cleared and levelled. The first group of settlers arrived in April 1958 from Granadilla. On 9 October another group arrived. Subsequently, groups of settlers affected by the reservoir arrived from the province of Salamanca, coming from villages such as Martinebrón (Sotoserrano), and other villages and farmsteads in the Hurdes, such as Arrofranco.

Although each family was assigned a house and a plot of land, they had to stay for some time in warehouses, called barracones. The first houses began to be delivered from 1960 onwards, although the electricity supply did not arrive until 1964 and running water was installed in 1969. During these early years the village was cut off from the road and in order to get to Galisteo they had to cross the river by boat and walk the rest of the way. On the other hand, there were also no services of any kind, and the first harvests were lost because the canalisation network was not finished, forcing several families to leave the village due to the bad economic situation. Little by little things improved and the people adapted to the new situation, recovering their enthusiasm and fighting to improve the village.

=== Parish of Galisteo ===
In 1979 it became administratively dependent on the municipality of Galisteo, in whose municipal district it was located. The mayor of Galisteo appointed a representative in the pedanía. In 1983 a Special Delegate Councillor was appointed for the first time for Alagón del Caudillo. In 1983 it was renamed simply Alagón.

The villagers wanted Alagón to become an independent municipality, and in 1995 all local political parties pledged that Alagón would become a minor local entity.

== See also ==
- List of municipalities in Cáceres

== Bibliography ==
- Abujeta Martín, Antonia Esther (2011). «La arquitectura del agua: estudio de fuentes y abrevaderos de los pueblos de colonización de Alagón (Cáceres)». NORBA: Revista de arte (31): 181–191. ISSN 0213-2214
