= Santa Ana, Cáceres =

Coordinates: 39°18′30″N 5°59′29″W

Santa Ana
- Flag Coat of arms

- Location in Spain.
- Country: Spain
- Autonomous community: Cáceres

Area
  - Total: 34.99 km^{2} (13.51 sq mi)
- Elevation: 256 m (840 ft)

Population (2025-01-01)
  - Total: 302
  - Density: 8.63/km^{2} (22.4/sq mi)
- Time zone: UTC+1 (CET)
  - Summer (DST): UTC+2 (CEST)
- Website: www.aytosantaana.es

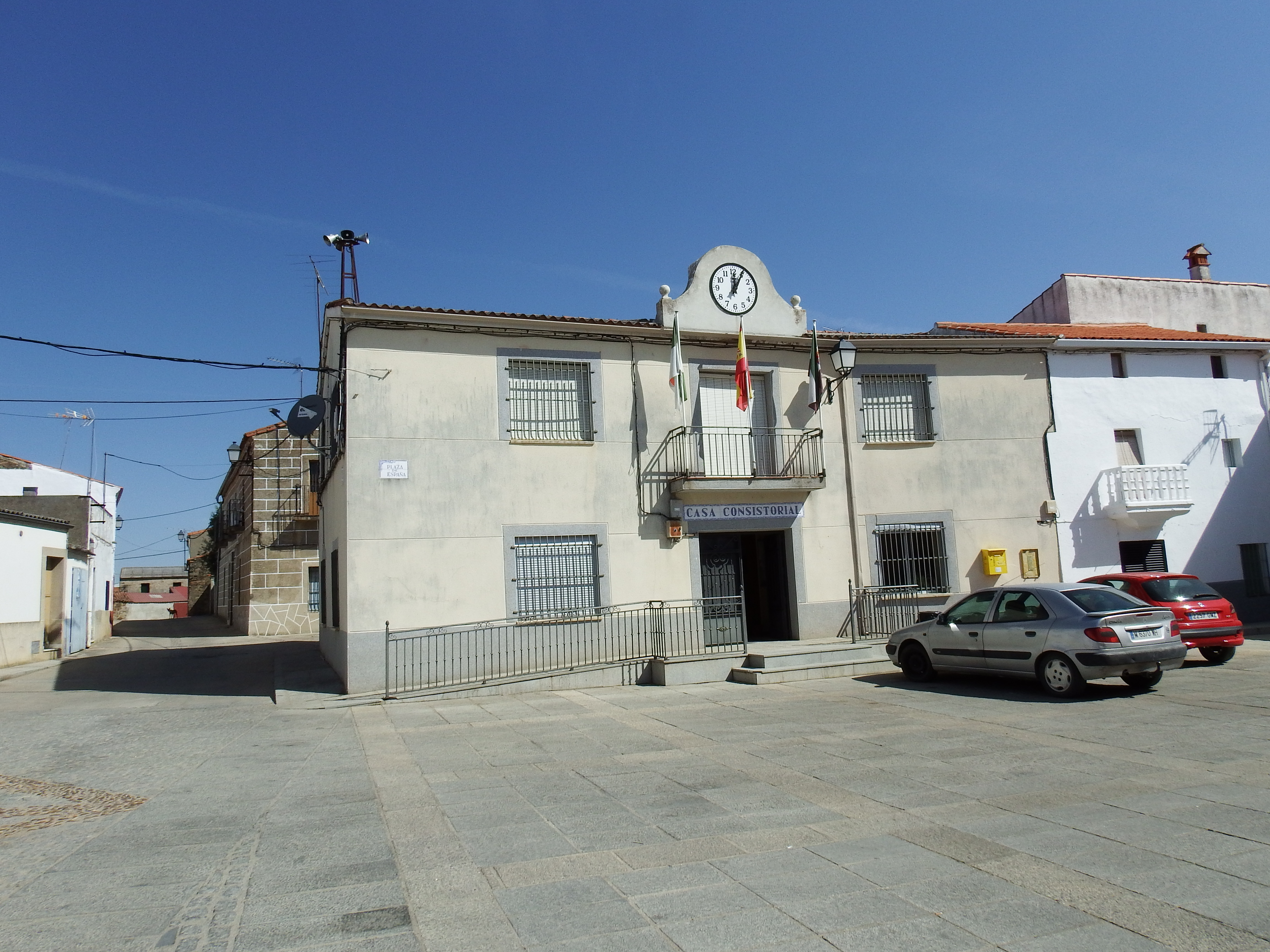

Santa Ana is a municipality in the province of Cáceres and autonomous community of Extremadura, Spain. The municipality covers an area of 34.99 square kilometres (13.51 sq mi) and as of 2011 had a population of 294 people.

== See also ==
- List of municipalities in Cáceres
