= Salobral =

- municipality
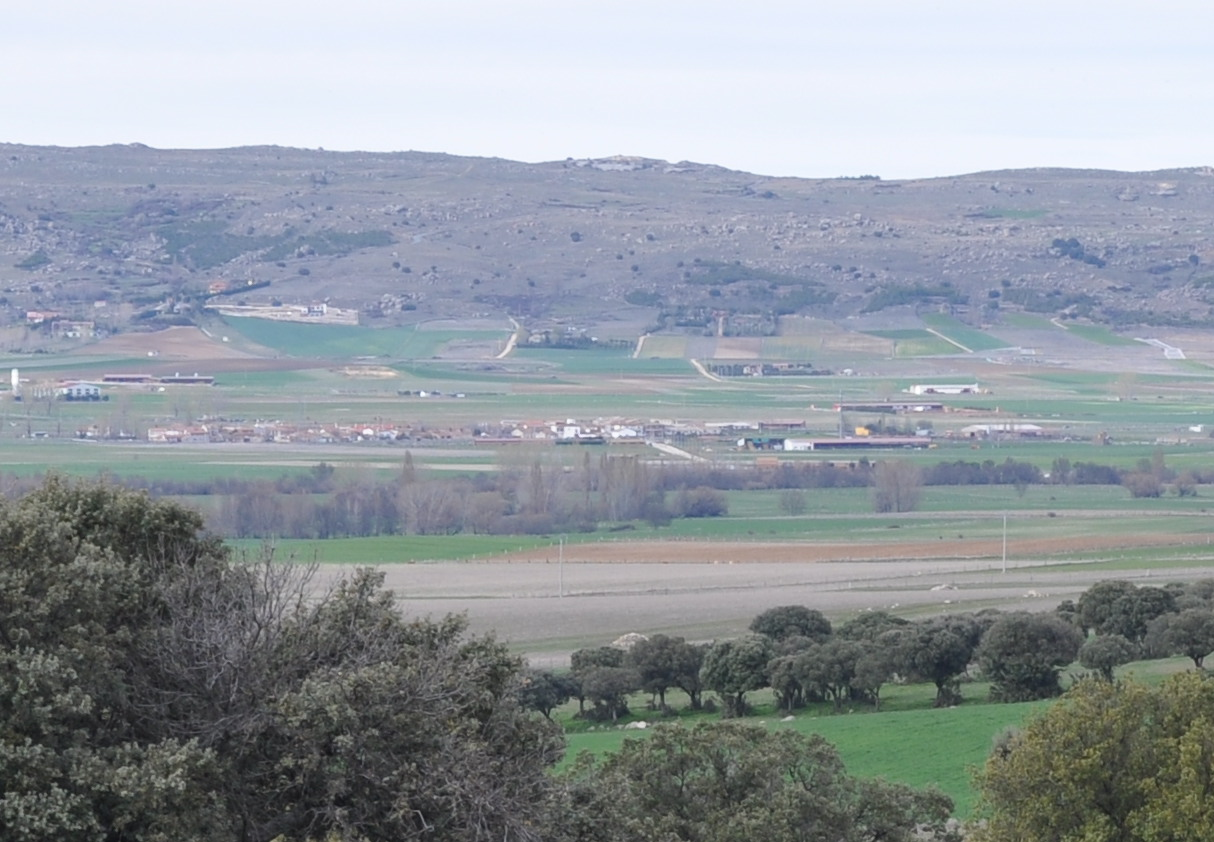
- Salobral

- Location in Spain. Salobral (Spain)
- Coordinates: 40°36′42″N 4°48′40″W
- Country: Spain
- Autonomous community: Castile and León
- Province: Ávila
- Municipality: Salobral

Area
  - Total: 7 km^{2} (2.7 sq mi)

Population (2025-01-01)
  - Total: 109
  - Density: 16/km^{2} (40/sq mi)
- Time zone: UTC+1 (CET)
  - Summer (DST): UTC+2 (CEST)
- Website: Official website

Salobral is a municipality located in the province of Ávila, Castile and León, Spain.

== Population ==
Historical population
Year	Pop.	±% p.a.
2023	111	—
2024	102	−8.11%
2025	109	+6.86%
Source: INE
