= Alcañizo =

Coordinates: 39°54′11″N 5°06′21″W

Alcañizo, Spain
- Flag Coat of arms

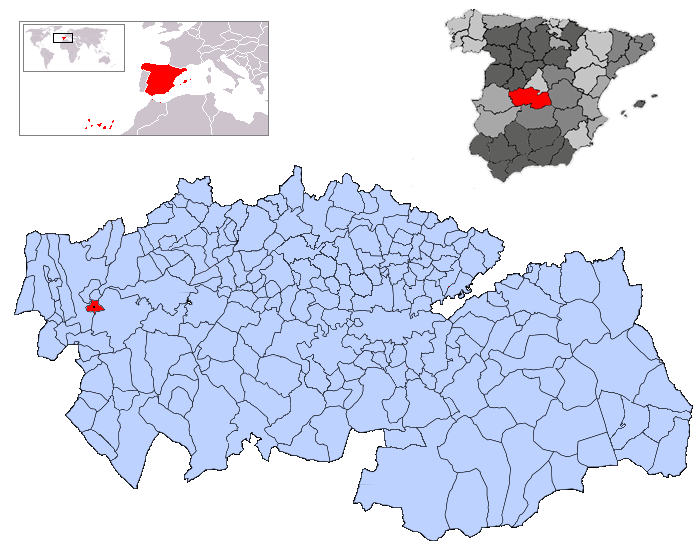
- Country: Spain
- Autonomous community: Castile-La Mancha
- Province: Toledo
- Municipality: Alcañizo

Area
  - Total: 13.51 km^{2} (5.22 sq mi)
- Elevation: 376 m (1,234 ft)

Population (2025-01-01)
  - Total: 259
  - Density: 19.2/km^{2} (49.7/sq mi)
- Time zone: UTC+1 (CET)
  - Summer (DST): UTC+2 (CEST)

Alcañizo is a municipality located in the province of Toledo, Castile-La Mancha, Spain.

According to the 2006 census (INE), the municipality had a population of 336 inhabitants.

== Demographics ==
Historical population
| Year | Pop. | ±% |
|---|---|---|
| 1900 | 717 | — |
| 1910 | 757 | +5.6% |
| 1920 | 746 | −1.5% |
| 1930 | 956 | +28.2% |
| 1940 | 985 | +3.0% |
| 1950 | 935 | −5.1% |
| 1960 | 877 | −6.2% |
| 1970 | 657 | −25.1% |
| 1981 | 457 | −30.4% |
| 1991 | 368 | −19.5% |
| 2001 | 324 | −12.0% |
| 2011 | 327 | +0.9% |
| 2021 | 274 | −16.2% |
| 2023 | 283 | +3.3% |
INE
