= Pradilla de Ebro =

Coordinates: 41°52′N 1°15′W

- municipality
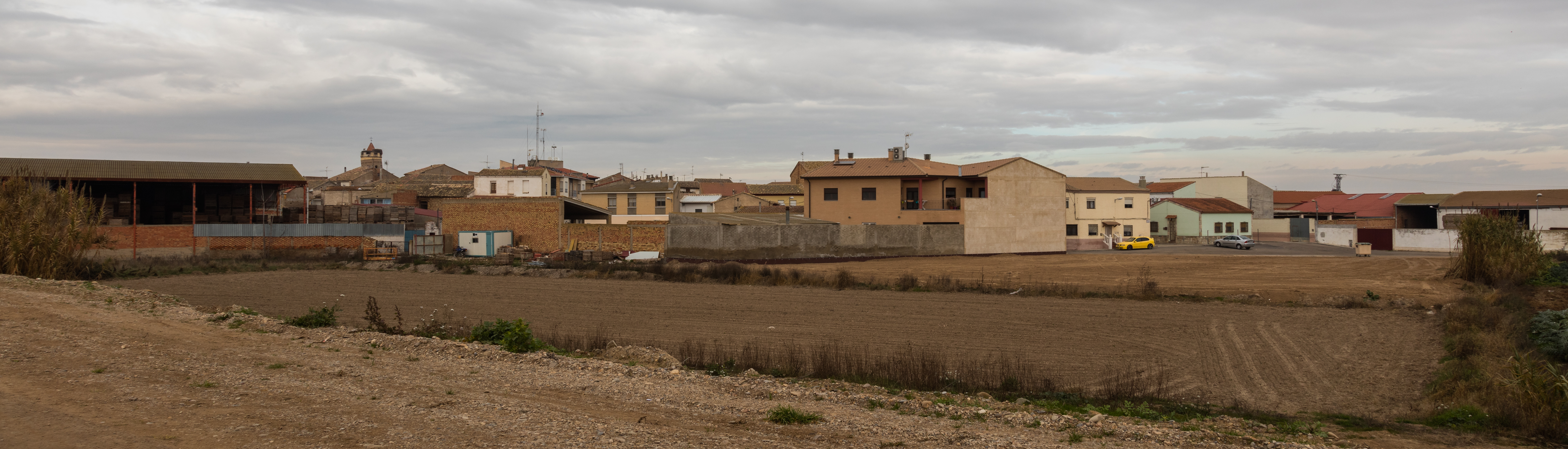

- Flag Coat of arms
- Interactive map of Pradilla de Ebro
- Country: Spain
- Autonomous community: Aragon
- Province: Zaragoza

Area
  - Total: 25 km^{2} (9.7 sq mi)

Population (2025-01-01)
  - Total: 553
  - Density: 22/km^{2} (57/sq mi)
- Time zone: UTC+1 (CET)
  - Summer (DST): UTC+2 (CEST)

Pradilla de Ebro is a municipality located in the province of Zaragoza, Aragon, Spain. According to the 2004 census (INE), the municipality has a population of 638 inhabitants.

== See also ==
- List of municipalities in Zaragoza
