= Donadio =

Donadio or Donadío is a surname of Italian origin. Variations include Donodeo, Donadeo and Donadei; derived from the Latin phrase dono Deo and Italian dono di Dio ("Gift of God"). Notable people with the surname include:

- Candida Donadio (1929-2001), American literary agent
- Giulio Donadio (1889–1951), Italian actor and film director
- Giovanni Francesco Donadio (1449-1530), nicknamed "Mormando", Italian architect and Master organist
- Sebastián Donadío (born 1972), Argentine track cyclist

== See also ==
- List of The Passage characters#Alicia Donadio
