= Guijo de Galisteo =

- municipality
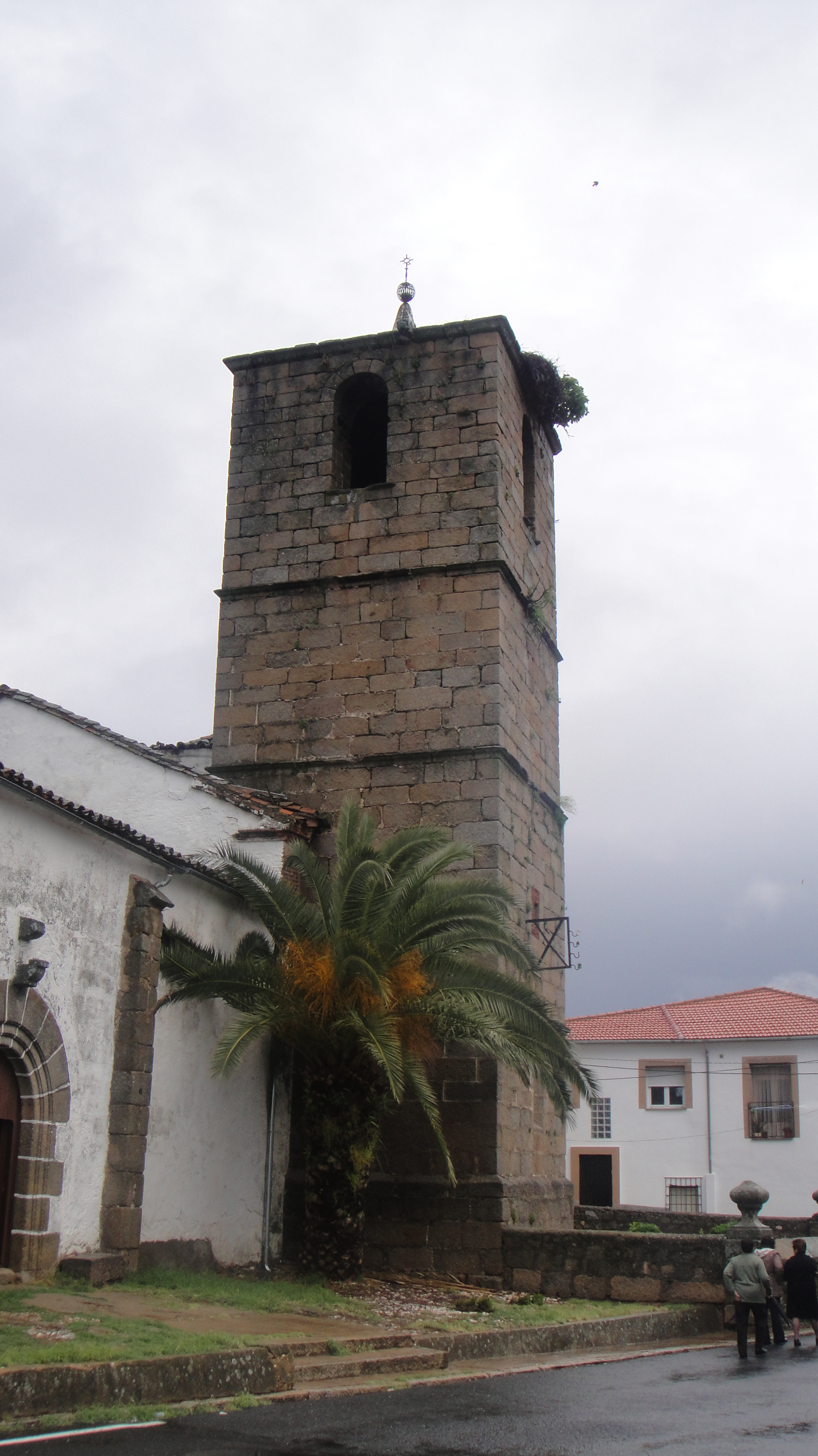
- Church in Guijo de Galisteo

- Flag Coat of arms
- Interactive map of Guijo de Galisteo
- Coordinates: 40°01′N 06°04′W
- Country: Spain
- Autonomous community: Extremadura
- Province: Cáceres
- Municipality: Guijo de Galisteo

Area
  - Total: 62.28 km^{2} (24.05 sq mi)
- Elevation: 427 m (1,401 ft)

Population (2025-01-01)
  - Total: 1,460
  - Density: 23.4/km^{2} (60.7/sq mi)
- Time zone: UTC+1 (CET)
  - Summer (DST): UTC+2 (CEST)
- Postal code: 10816
- Website: http://www.guijodegalisteo.es/

Guijo de Galisteo is a municipality located in the province of Cáceres, Extremadura, Spain. According to the 2008 census (INE), the municipality has a population of 1513 inhabitants.

== Demographics ==
Population between 1900 and 2008
1900	1910	1920	1930	1940	1950	1960	1970	1981	1991
826	900	765	773	875	854	858	1033	1864	1710
1996	1999	2001	2002	2003	2004	2005	2006	2007	2008
1841	1829	1837	1839	1530	1552	1511	1513	1510	1614

== Villages ==
- Guijo de Galisteo
- Valrío, 400 inhabitants. Founded in the 1950s
- El Batán, 850 inhabitants. Founded in the 1950s by the Instituto Nacional de Colonización

== See also ==
- List of municipalities in Cáceres
