= Los Gandules =

Spanish comedy band

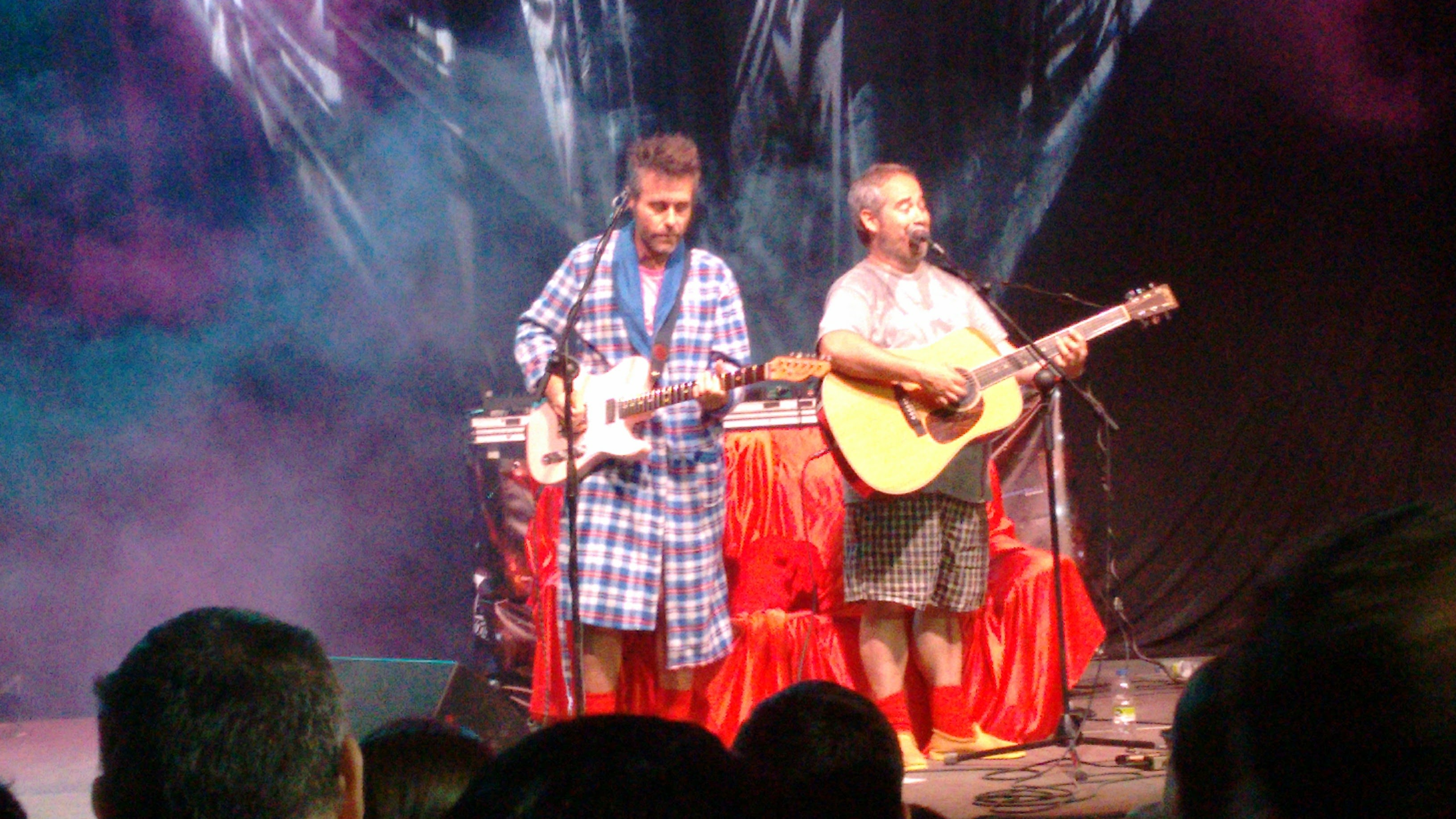
Los Gandules Fiestas Valdespartera 2017 Los Gandules, Pilar 2016, img 2

Los Gandules are a Spanish humoristic musical group.

== Group members ==
Dun Gandul: His real name is Santiago, is from Calatayud (Zaragoza).

Tobo Gandul: His real name is Roberto, he was born in Zaragoza, and used to be a member of the group Los Berzas.

== Discography ==
Sillonbol Stars:

01 - Paul Newman se pone farruco

02 - Cacerolas

03 - El hombre y la finca

04 - Bayas, bayas

05 - Blas en frac

06 - El gorrión pasa

07 - Que peste a pinreles

08 - Sin papeles

09 - Serie de sobremesa

10 - El speed de González

11 - Rober Redford saluda

12 - Yaestanahí

13 - Orrop nu etzah, oit, he

14 - La china no se quema

15 - Desde luego no

16 - Miguel Ángel

17 - Denominación de origen

18 - Tate quieto

19 - Los Gandules componen

20 - Paté de pato

21 - He potado en la noria

22 - Eran dos punkies requetefinos

Sillonbol Kings:

01 - Robert De Niro se pone farruco

02 - No te tires

03 - Carroña

04 - Rocky Balbucea VI

05 - Batman, Robin

06 - Punset no va al grano

07 - Verano gandul

08 - La Década Apestosa mix

09 - Los gandules van a Eurovisión

10 - Purulento es el pus

11 - Katastrophen

12 - Malos tiempos para Sergei

13 - Pasión leguminosa

14 - Lucas el entrañable

15 - Los Gandules ven La 2

16 - Barbillas brillantes

17 - Hellraiser

18 - Barbillas brillantes al ralentí

19 - Cuídame el gato

20 - Cabezada monumental

21 - Esquimal fatal

22 - Desliz con tu prima

23 - A la sombra de un pepino

24 - Bonobus track

Sillonbol Heroes (2007):

01 - Takeshi Kitano se pone farruco

02 - El melón de acero (la tapia)

03 - pulpo un poco pocho

04 - Calamar o paloma

05 - Tobo se baña

06 - Todo lo que quiso saber sobre el románico y nunca se atrevió a preguntar

07 - Los Gandules juegan a las adivinanzas

08 - Hostelería montisonense

09 - Achtung bomben!

10 - La década apestosa mix 2

11 - ¿De qué me han servido todos estos años de carrera y MIR?

12 - Mala gana

13 - Water Turco

14 - La rebelión de los salados

15 - Si Gagarin levantara el casco

16 - Dr. Oliver Rodés, supongo

17 - Obstetricia en Bucarest

18 - Pienso, luego Egipto

19 - Caro primo

20 - El flotar se va an acabar

21 - Tigretón

22 - La mantelería

23 - Los funcionarios también lloran

24 - Salta la banca en la droguería

25 - Culebra letal

26 - Dun polígloto

27 - Bonobús track
