= Gimenells i el Pla de la Font =

- Municipality
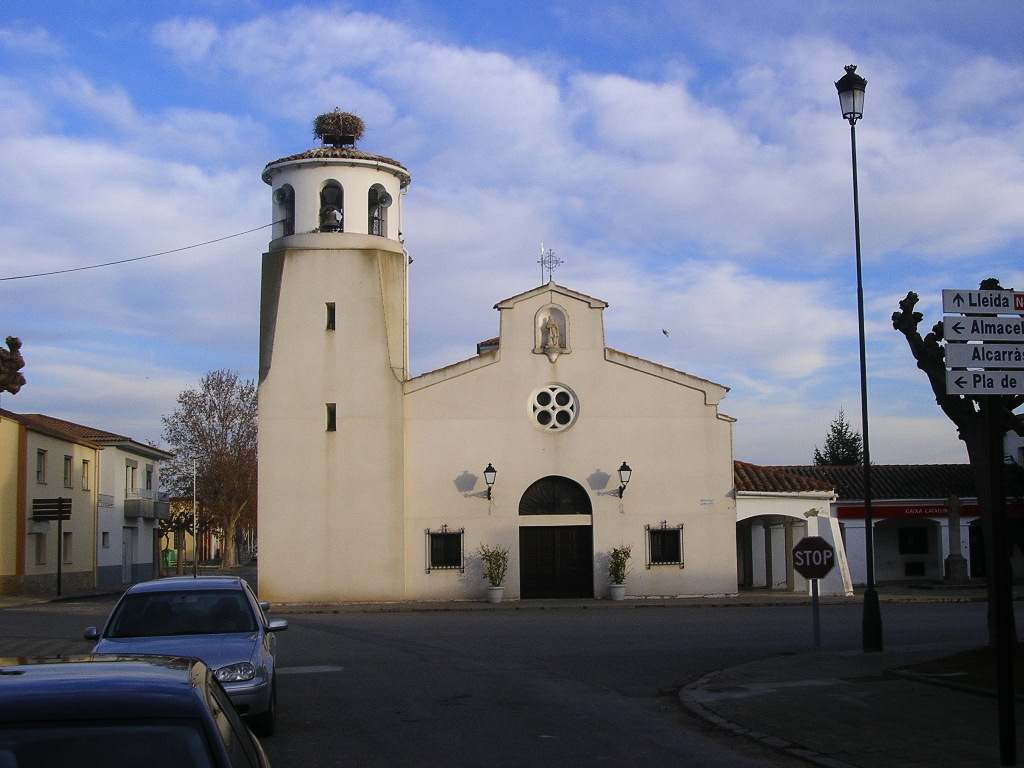
- The Roser Church in Gimenells

- Flag Coat of arms

- Location in Catalonia
- Coordinates: 41°39′N 0°23′E
- Country: Spain
- Community: Catalonia
- Province: Lleida
- Comarca: Segrià

Government
  - Mayor: Dante Pérez Berenguer (2015)

Area
  - Total: 55.8 km^{2} (21.5 sq mi)
- Elevation: 258 m (846 ft)

Population (2025-01-01)
  - Total: 1,069
  - Density: 19.2/km^{2} (49.6/sq mi)
- Website: www.gimenells.cat

Gimenells i el Pla de la Font (Catalan pronunciation: [dʒimeˈneʎz i el ˈpla ðe la ˈfɔn]) is a municipality in Segrià, Catalonia, Spain, made up of the settlements of Gimenells and the smaller el Pla de la Font. It has an area of 55.8 square kilometres and in 2011 had a population of 1,169. The mayor is Dante Pérez Berenguer.

It has a population of 1,069 (register office, 2025).
