= El Bayo =

Settlement in Ejea de los Caballeros, Zaragoza, Spain

- Coordinates: 42°11′17″N 1°15′50″W
- Country: Spain
- Autonomous community: Aragón
- Province: Zaragoza
- Comarca: Cinco Villas
- Municipality: Ejea de los Caballeros

Area
  - Total: 35.67 km^{2} (13.77 sq mi)
- Elevation: 346 m (1,135 ft)
- Demonym(s): Bayero, ra
- Area code: 976
- Website: Rivas

El Bayo is a settlement in the municipality of Ejea de los Caballeros, in the province of Zaragoza.

== History ==
Along with other settler villages of Ejea de los Caballeros, this locality was inaugurated on April 8, 1959, and quickly the first settlers began to arrive, coming from Ejea, Biota, Carenas, Nuévalos, Farasdués, Gallur, Rivas, Uncastillo and Tiermas, among others.

The village took its name from the medieval settlement that had existed in the same place from 1100 until 1380, when it was razed due to the clashes between Aragon and Navarre. In 1146, Ramiro II, nicknamed the Monk, founded a Cistercian monastery, whose ruins still remain with important Romanesque remains. These remains, together with three other medieval buildings and a necropolis from the same period, form the ruins known as Las Torres de El Bayo.

At its foundation, El Bayo had a total of 165 houses and 114 settlers; where Tiermas was one of the towns that helped to populate this locality, since a total of 55 families moved there.

At present, this settler town has approximately 350 inhabitants.

== Festivities ==
On January 20, the feast in honor of San Sebastián is celebrated.

On May 10, the festivities in honor of Isidore the Laborer are celebrated, along with the other settler towns due to their main source of income from agriculture.

The main festivities in honor of St. Raphael are held from July 30 to August 3, although these days vary in order to ensure that the festivities are held from Wednesday to Sunday.

== See also ==
- Tiermas
