= Juan José Cuadros Pérez =

Spanish writer (1926–1990)

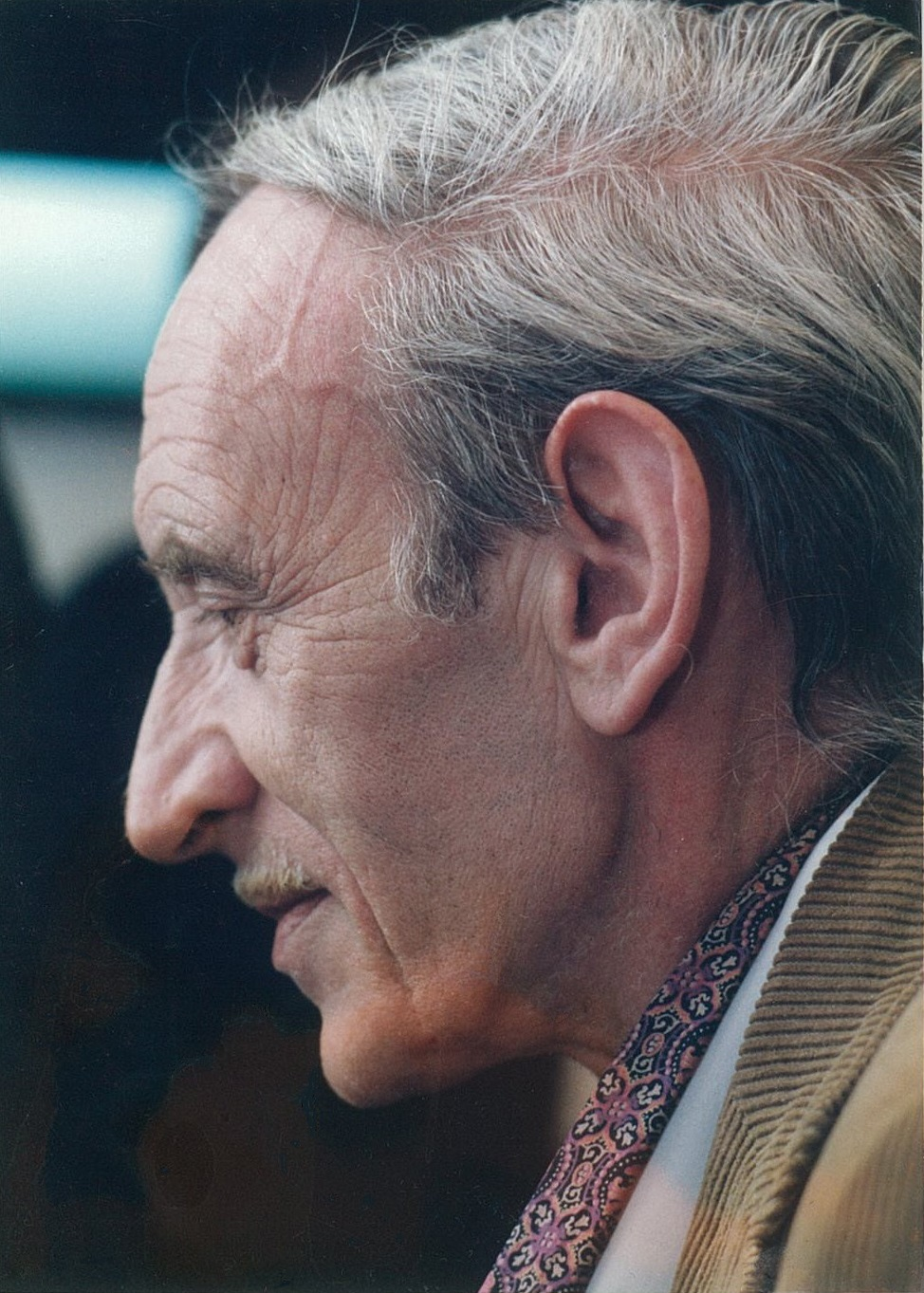
- Born: Juan José Cuadros Pérez; 7 October 1926; Palencia, Spain
- Died: 27 May 1990 (aged 63); Madrid, Spain
- Occupations: Poet, writers
- Spouse: Maruja
- Children: Almudena
- Writing career
- Pen name: Martín de Fromista
- Language: Spanish
- Period: 20th century
- Notable works: Niño sin amigos, Aquí se dice de un Pueblo, Navanunca, El Asedio (poesía), Recado de buen amor, Vuelta al Sur, Memoria del camino, El único camino, Los últimos caminos, Caminos (antología poética) Viaje a la Sierra de Segura, El libro de Guindalera, Por los cerros de Úbeda, Tiempo rescatado, Por tierra de pan amar and Al amor de los clásicos.
- Notable awards: González de Lama 1974; Antonio Camuñas 1983
- Movement: Social poetry

Signature
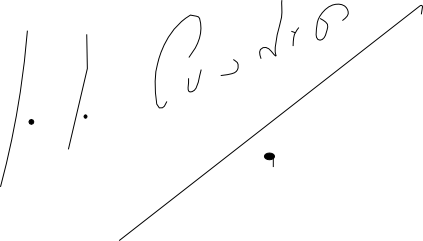

Juan José Cuadros Perez (Palencia, October 9, 1926 - Madrid, May 27, 1990) was a Spanish writer of poetry and prose. His father, Juan José Cuadros, was a native of Beas de Segura (Jaén), which, in the 1920s met and married Josefa Perez Palencia. John Joseph was the oldest of four children.

He grew up in Beas de Segura (Jaén), a town that belongs to the Sierra de Segura, in Andalusia. In 1941 he moved to Baeza, to continue high school.

It is from 1945 when part to Madrid and began to study sciences in the Faculty of Sciences, then had to leave school, posing as opposition to the Body of Surveyors and taking place in the National Geographic Institute, finally settling to live in the capital, combining his work with the surveyor of his fondness for the prose and poetry. In Madrid met Maruja Fernandez de Ayala, pharmaceutical, whom he married and born of the marriage was born the only daughter, Almudena. Thanks to the work of his wife, meet other poets associated with the branch of pharmacy, as in the case of Federico Muelas and later to Rafael Palma, organized in their respective reboticas gatherings attended by among others José García Nieto, Santiago Ammon, Ramon Garciasol etc.

After the death of his mother in 1958, feels a special nostalgia for his homeland, and frequent visits to Palencia, where he met other poets soon permeating and integrating them in the group's magazine from Rocamador. that date onwards when dialing an intense period of publications in different newspapers and magazines, and participate in various literary gatherings. His work surveyor also gave him the opportunity to visit virtually almost all Spanish geography, all publishing fluctuated more life half a dozen books and numerous other publications and many books that came to light after his untimely death in the Spring 1990.

His great desire and recognized literary merit is offset by their peers, receiving countless posthumous tributes in addition to public and private institutions. In 1997 the city of Palencia Palencia inaugurated a street with his name, also his unpublished poems were published, and even in 2008 César Augusto Ayuso meets his literary studies, giving way in the book Love recalling the classic authors who influenced his work. In 2010, Beas de Segura pays tribute in memory of the 20 years after his death, with a cultural event sponsored by the City of Beas.

== Biography ==
=== Early years ===
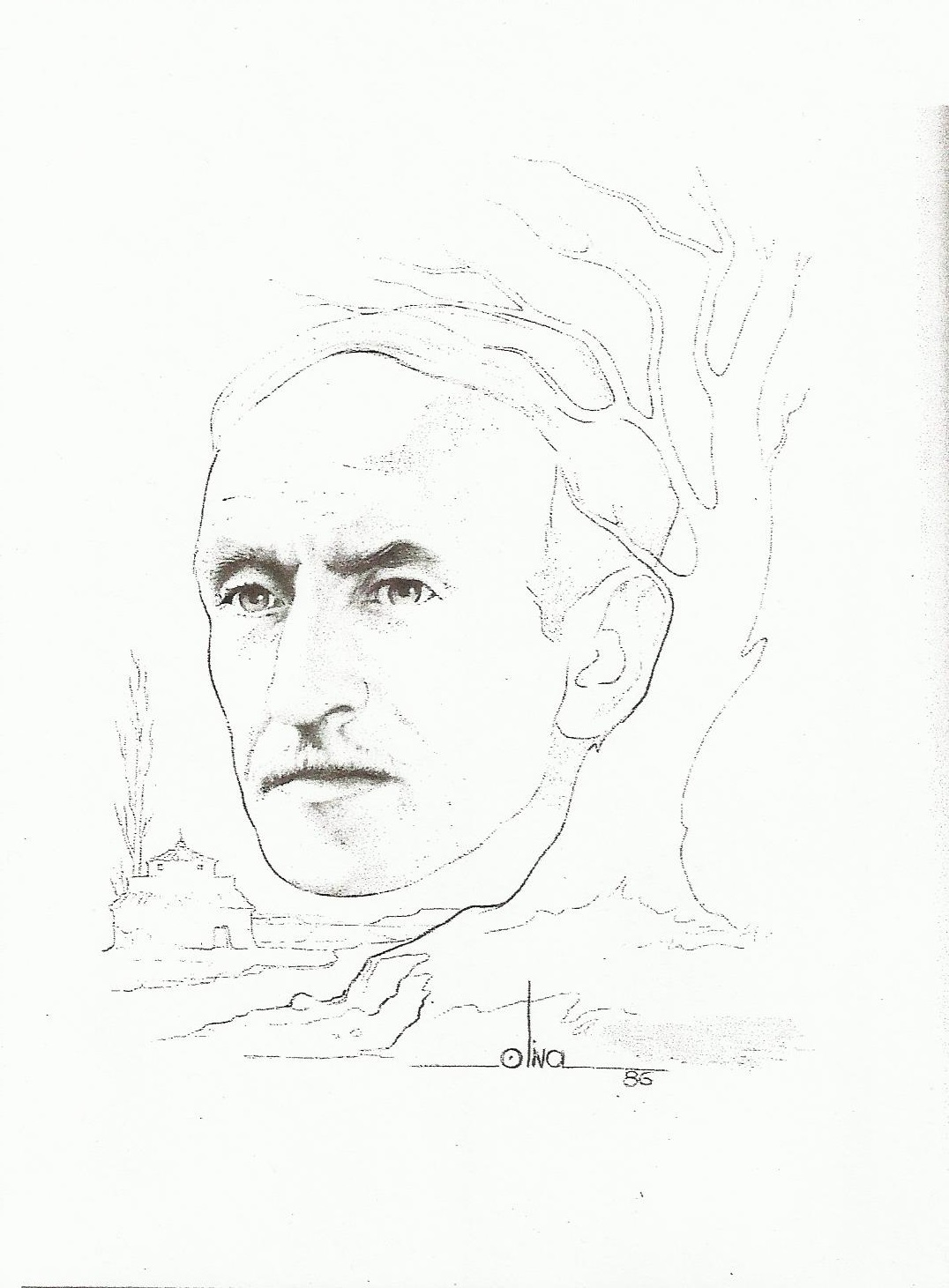
Charcoal drawing of Juan Jose Cuadros, made by Rafael Oliva in 1986.

Born in Palencia in Barrio and Mier Street, suddenly when he was only three years old, the family returned to the paternal estate, Beas de Segura, there will the first decade of his life, knowing his father's family, where he lives with them. For his grandfather Antonio, baker by profession, not being very happy with the name of the grandson, called "Toñin", and his hand teaches the customs, the people, the places and the whole environment surrounding the grandfather. Young blond, blue-eyed, that the town was struck.

Pass during those years of childhood, meeting friends, and making the streets and squares of the town and raiding scenario games, as Repullete Alley, Enmedio Street or Paseo Barbican with his friend Miguel Ojeda, Uncle Pepe or Antonio Llavero, who will dedicate the booklet, here is said of a people. This stage of your life will be marked, and years later reflected in his poems like a rocket deaf in unison.

In Beas de Segura live in those fateful years of the Spanish Civil War, with only ten years old, he realizes that surrounds him, and somehow those memories will forever remain etched in memory, one of them, is when in 1939 his father was transferred to Barcelona, and the following year exile from Spain goes south of France, and from there to Paris, returning south again French, by being closer to Spain, where install until his return in 1948. That vacuum paternal in his adolescence makes resent, and her mother is the one responsible for their care and education. And the other event the loss of two of his brothers at very early ages, Carlos and Alfonso. Just stay Germán, who settled in Cuenca.

We will have good memories of his master in Beas, Luis Ardoy, which will then dedicate a poem in the book and friendless boy would write one on here said of a people, and in this booklet reflects well as representative the people, The patron, the profession of his grandfather, his compatriots, rain and closes with the oil, Beas main economic wealth. Likewise also externalized all lived in Beas, in time rescued, carefully detailing the years of childhood.

=== Studies ===
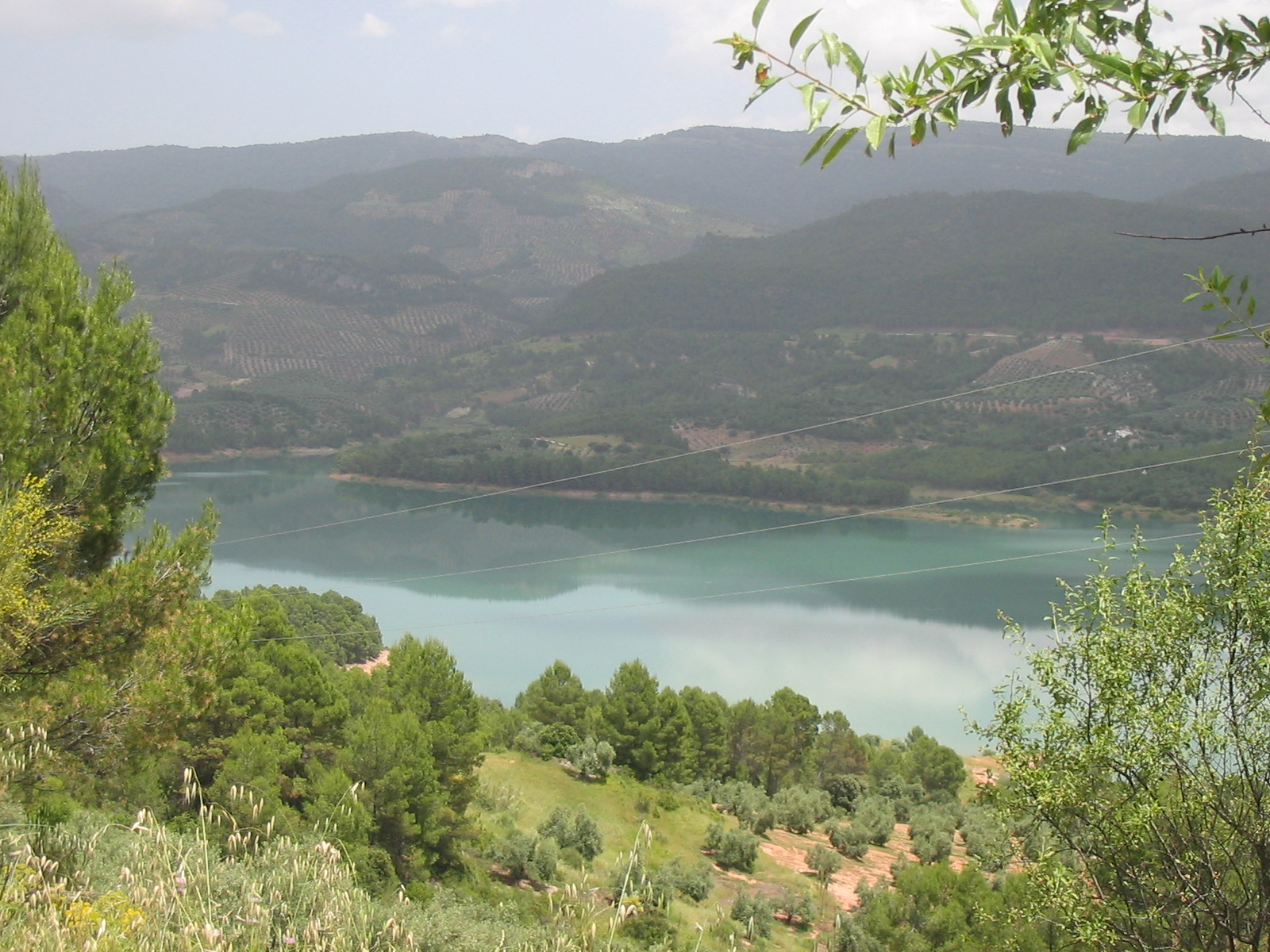
Guadalquivir river as it passes through the Sierra de Segura, (Pantano del Tranco).

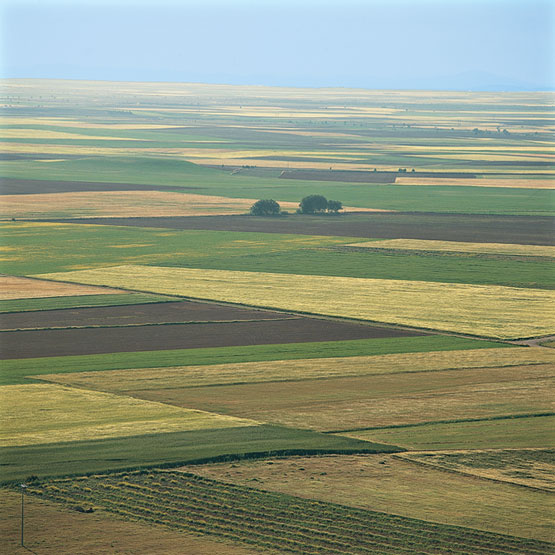
Tierra de Campos in the provincia de Palencia.

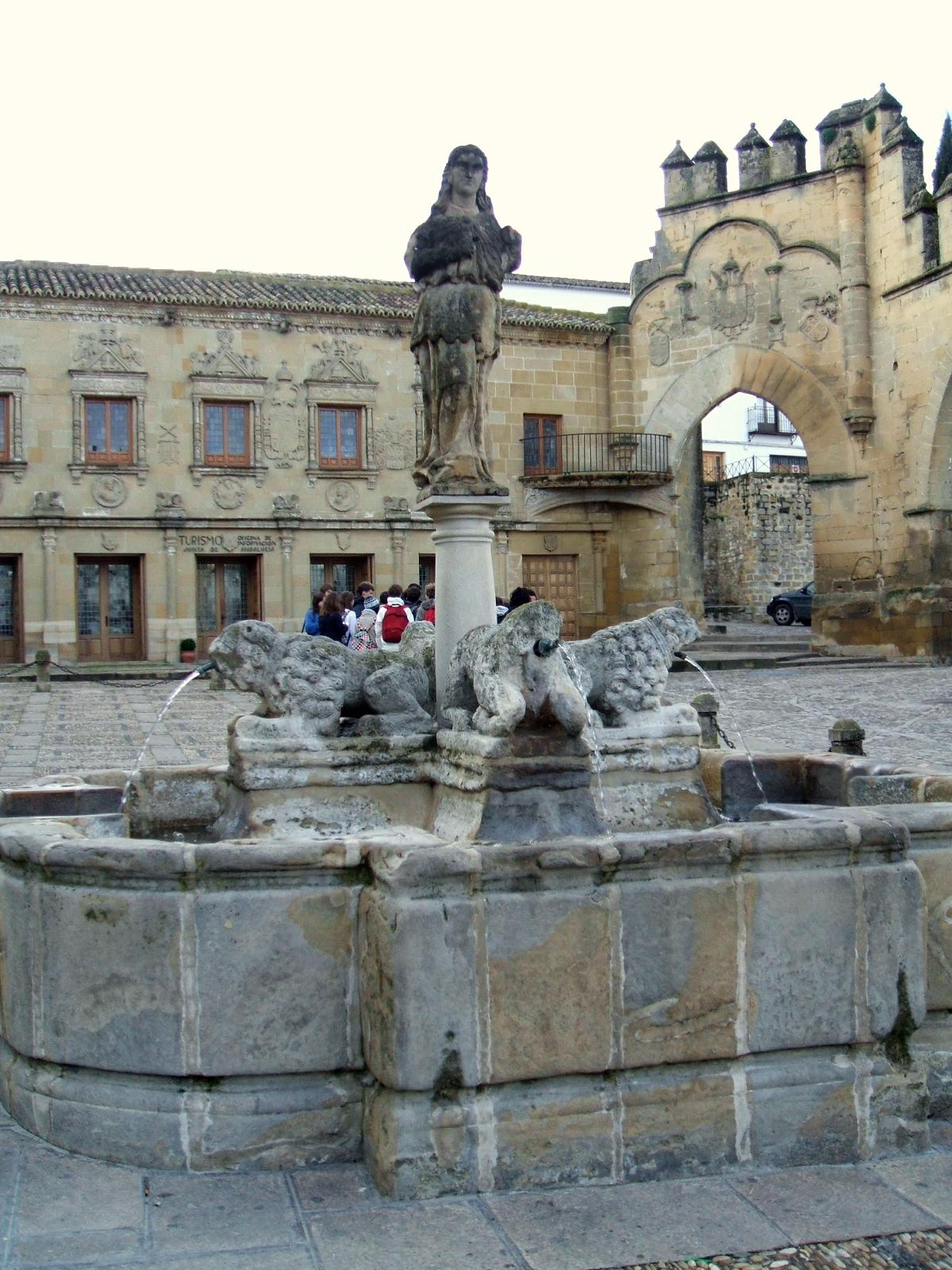
Fountain Plaza lions in Baeza.

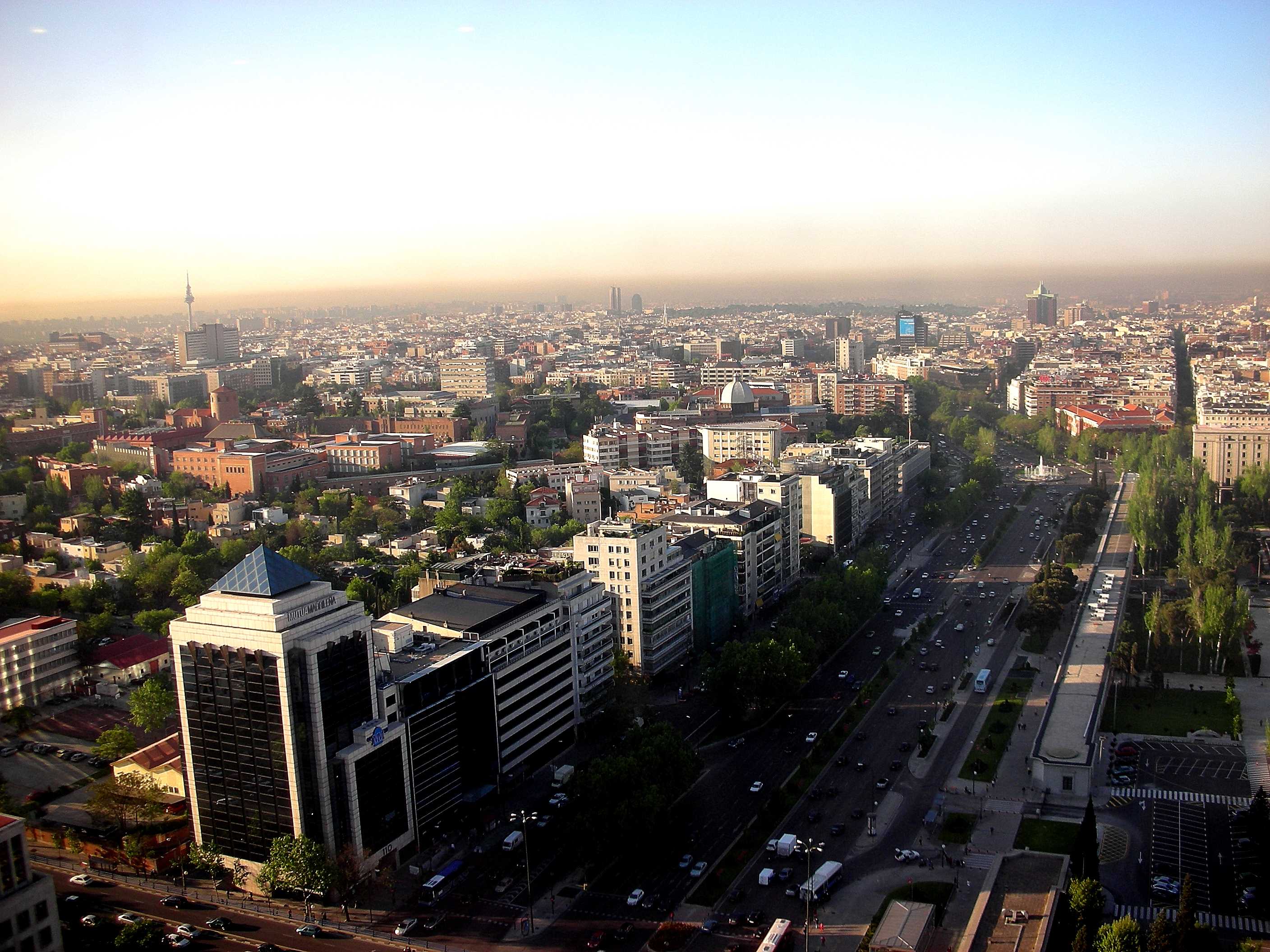
Barrio de Salamanca in Madrid, where he lived and drew inspiration for his book La Guindalera.

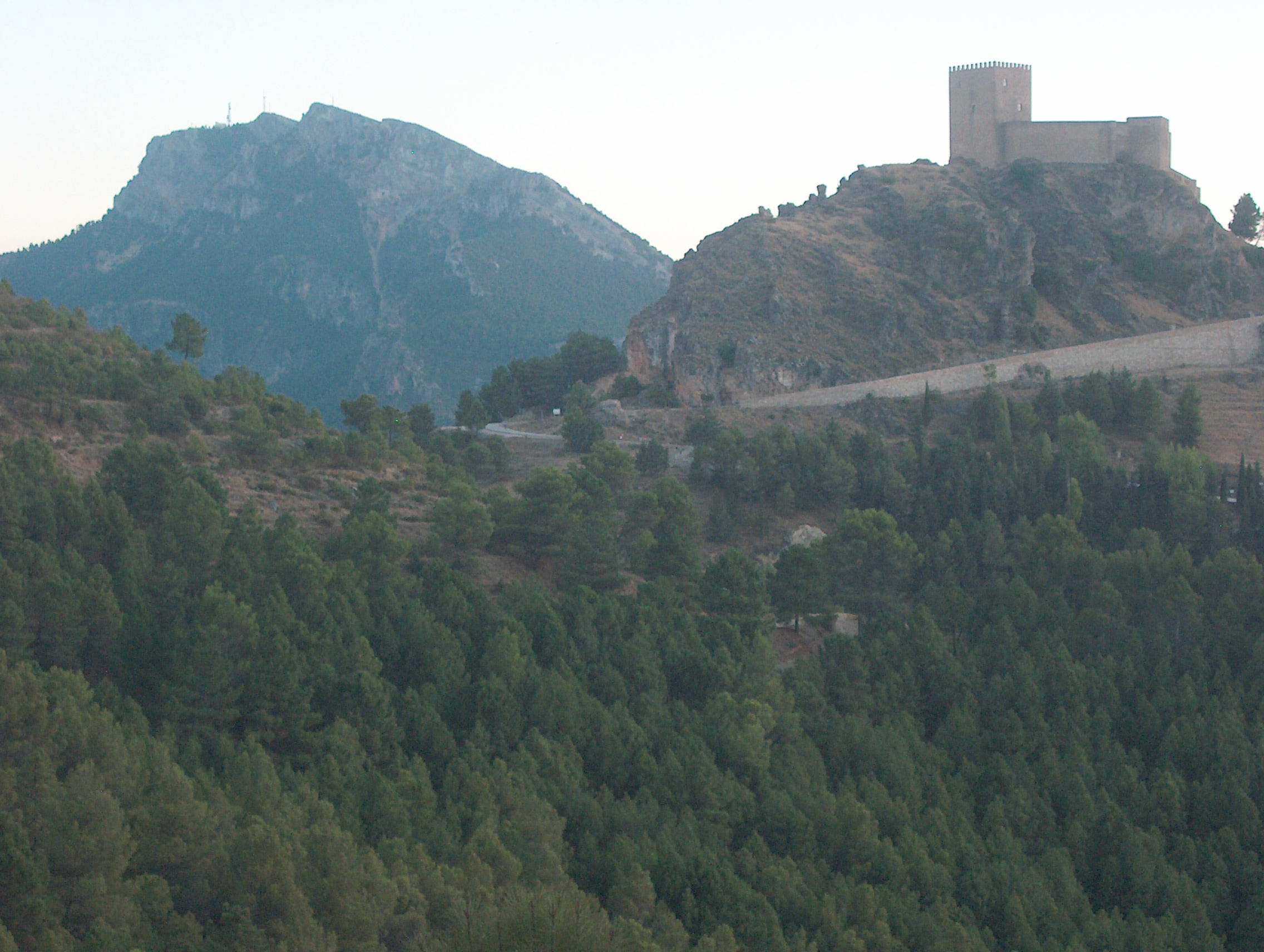
Castle of Segura de la Sierra and Yelmo Mountain in the background.

From a young age would show good intelligence, character, being a good observer and own imagination. His first studies in Beas de Segura, even to eleventh grade. After the war, in the course of 1941–42, he moved to study in Baeza (Jaén), finishing high school there at the same institute who years earlier had been a teacher of French, Antonio Machado. Those memories still lingered of Don Antonio, influenced him to declinarse for literature and especially poetry. De Beas, we were etched memories of those two universal mystic, St. Teresa of Avila and St. John of the Cross, who once left their mark on the town.

After his move to Baeza, and turns to Beas on weekends, holidays and summer vacation, participated in these summer camps that were enacted for young people between 14 and 17 years, attending one of them that was organized Morciguillinas area in the Sierra de Segura, by his talents and motivations, was appointed by the chronicler above the camp, and began writing a journal of all relevant events that were happening. Youth met there also municipalities in the region of the Sierra de Segura, with which locked very good friendship that years later he scored with a rare visit, collecting data mode that was drawing sketches of all the peoples of the highlands. The companions of the Institute Publications service offered to publish his work, was his first book of prose, which, coincidentally was published three days before his death: Journey to the Sierra de Segura.

In 1945, finished as the Bachelor of Baeza, spends revalidated at the University of Granada, and moved to Madrid to continue his studies at the Royal Academy, deciding to exact sciences, but in those postwar years were scarce economic resources and needed to switch the studies with work, having to give up. Viewing impossible goal, scored another course and submitted to the Corps of Surveyors oppositar where oppositions pulled with great effort and sacrifice, and began working in the National Geographic Institute of Spain, until his last days. He settled in Madrid, where he lived, not without visiting the land where he was born and where he grew up.

Here in Madrid, he met Maruja Fernandez de Ayala, whom he married and had a daughter, Almudena. Maruja and Almudena, have always been present in the author's work, with their autographs.

== Dedicatión ==
Alternating work with his love of poetry and prose, with the ideal setting for this, his hometown, Palencia, adoptive, Beas de Segura and cultural Baeza. And flags, Tierra de Campos in Castile and the Guadalquivir in Andalusia. In 1948, began making its first steps in the press, the first published poems that makes it through Jaen Journal are countless as published. To cite a few:

- Year 1948: High Jaén, the peoples in my memory Baeza, Linares, Andújar, The Guadalquivir, Villanueva, etc.
- Year 1957: Andalucía en la poesía.
- Romance a Baeza.
- Romance del navío de Piedra.
- April 19, 1959: Guadalquivir river giennense vocation. Part 1.
- May 12, 1959: Guadalquivir river giennense vocation. Part 2.
- Year 1960: Cervantes, Antonio Machado and Baeza.

They soon germinate their disclosures, and June 20, 1960, the prize of Natural Flower, issued by the Directorate General of Primary Education 5000 equipped with ESP, to the best work of the theme "The Virgin and the Magisterium" in the Floral Games of the Magisterium, for the work "The Juggler", being shared the award with Rafael Palma.

On arrival in Madrid, would soon enter the world attending literary gatherings, conferences, cafes, etc.. They soon meet Federico Muelas, which will prolong his first book, Child friendless, also Gerardo Diego, José Hierro, Vicente Aleixandre or Ramón Garciasol, who will join a close friendship, and give good advice, even to motivate point for the classic taste.

When his father returned from France in 1948, it intended to Villanueva del Arzobispo, where he settled definitively family, although Juan José was already in Madrid, were frequent visits to Villanueva and Beas, and that's when his first poems appear in the Jaen Journal, and gained fame after the City Council proposes to the parties crier Villanueva del Arzobispo (Jaén), which gave the proclamation of the parties on September 6, 1960, on the occasion of the fair. Also in the Sanctuary of the Fuensanta de Villanueva, at the entrance, next to the door, his poems are engraved with others of José María Pemán.

After the death of his mother, Josefina Perez Ceinos, in February 1958, feeling nostalgic for visiting their maternal roots, and from the following year, 1959, comes into contact with land assiduously palentinas, there hand a family member, soon will know people with the same interests as him. So José María Fernández Nieto known as Marcelino García Velasco, who in 1955 had created the magazine Rocamadour, being director and deputy director, respectively. Also known to Manuel Carrión, with which trabaría very good friendship to be moved to Madrid in 1962, with the post of deputy director of the National Library. Starting to publish poems in the number 15 of the magazine, with a poem by poem title ever, these compositions were the purest Castilian style, combining the essence with the vision of those years, dye splashed Andalusian, creates a rare mixture adds a later distinct. from number 33, he joined the editorial staff of the magazine. In November 1959, takes over from Madrid correspondent, giving news of literary events that are raising in the capital, and going for the record of them in letters under the pseudonym Martin de Fromista, in this manner:

Death was the course and in his funeral speech to Your Grace, that good honors were made with the verses of some other fuéranle mangüer the poison to take with feet forward, that curandericos poison there with titles who, in the absence recipe, write sonnets and with equal misconduct.
Letter of Don Martin.

Actually these letters were a literary criticism literary movements Madrid, also news, and other details that were happening, counted in old Castilian, giving a personal touch, counting with the help of Manuel Carrión estimable from office in the National Library of Spain, thus being aware first hand of all the new books that came up in the country. He was also the one who started the collection Rocamadour with its first publication in the summer of 1961, with Navanunca, from there, you were continuing the publications with the most outstanding poets of the time.

The pharmacy

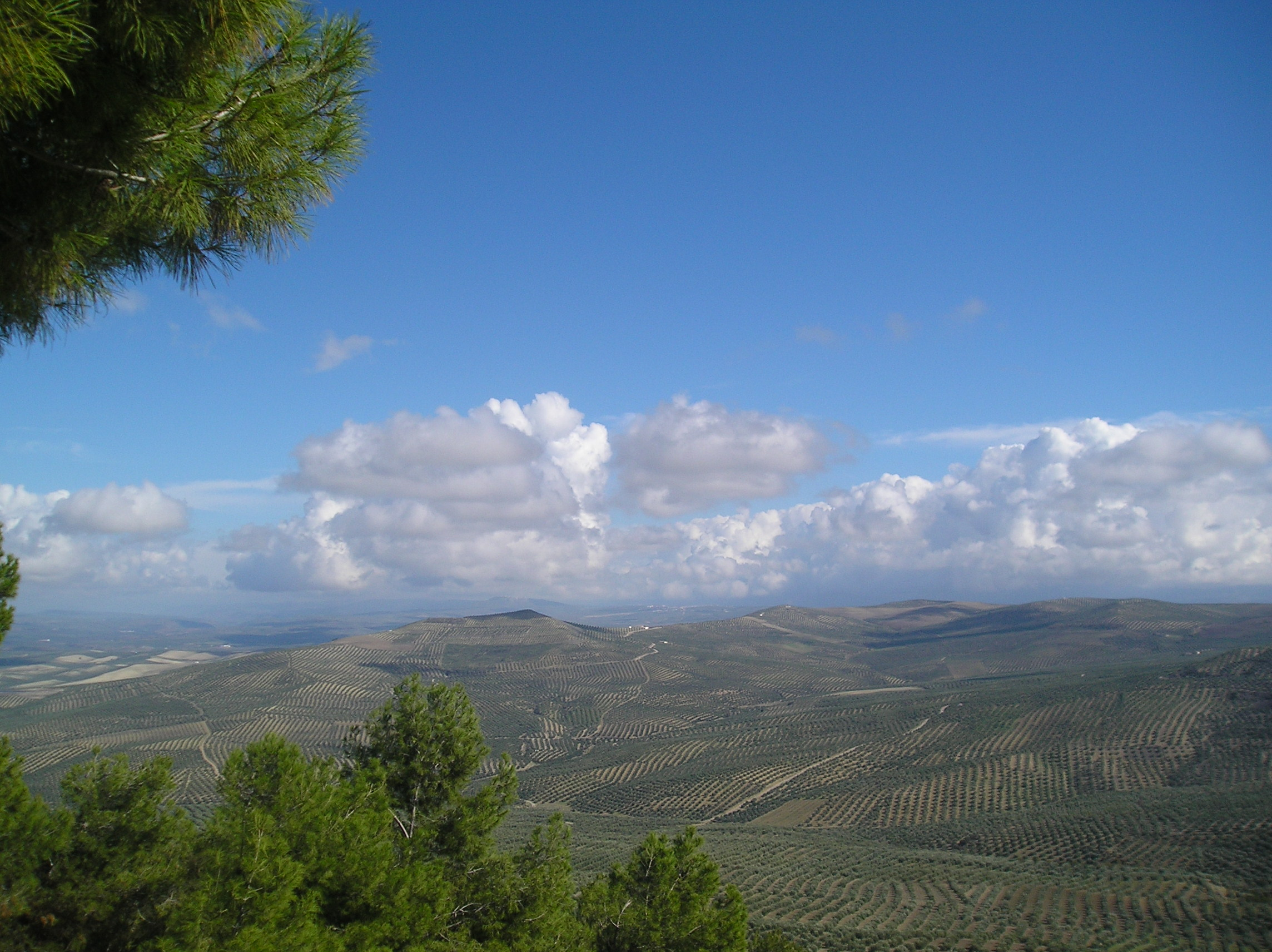
Loma de Úbeda (view Sabiote), fruit of inspiration for his book, Por los cerros de Úbeda.

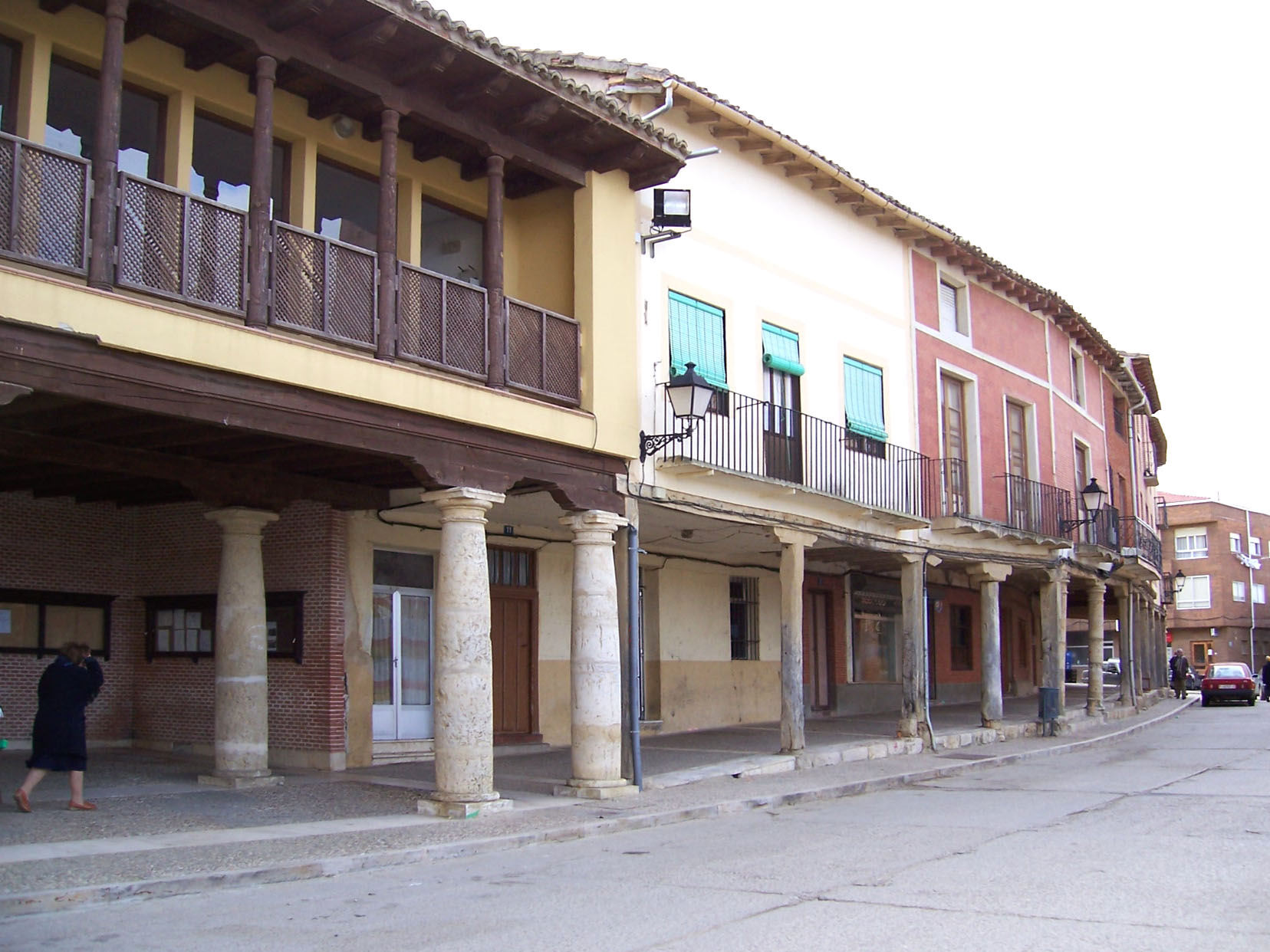
Arcade in a street Becerril de Campos (Palencia), one of the people who appear in his book, Por tierra de pan amar.

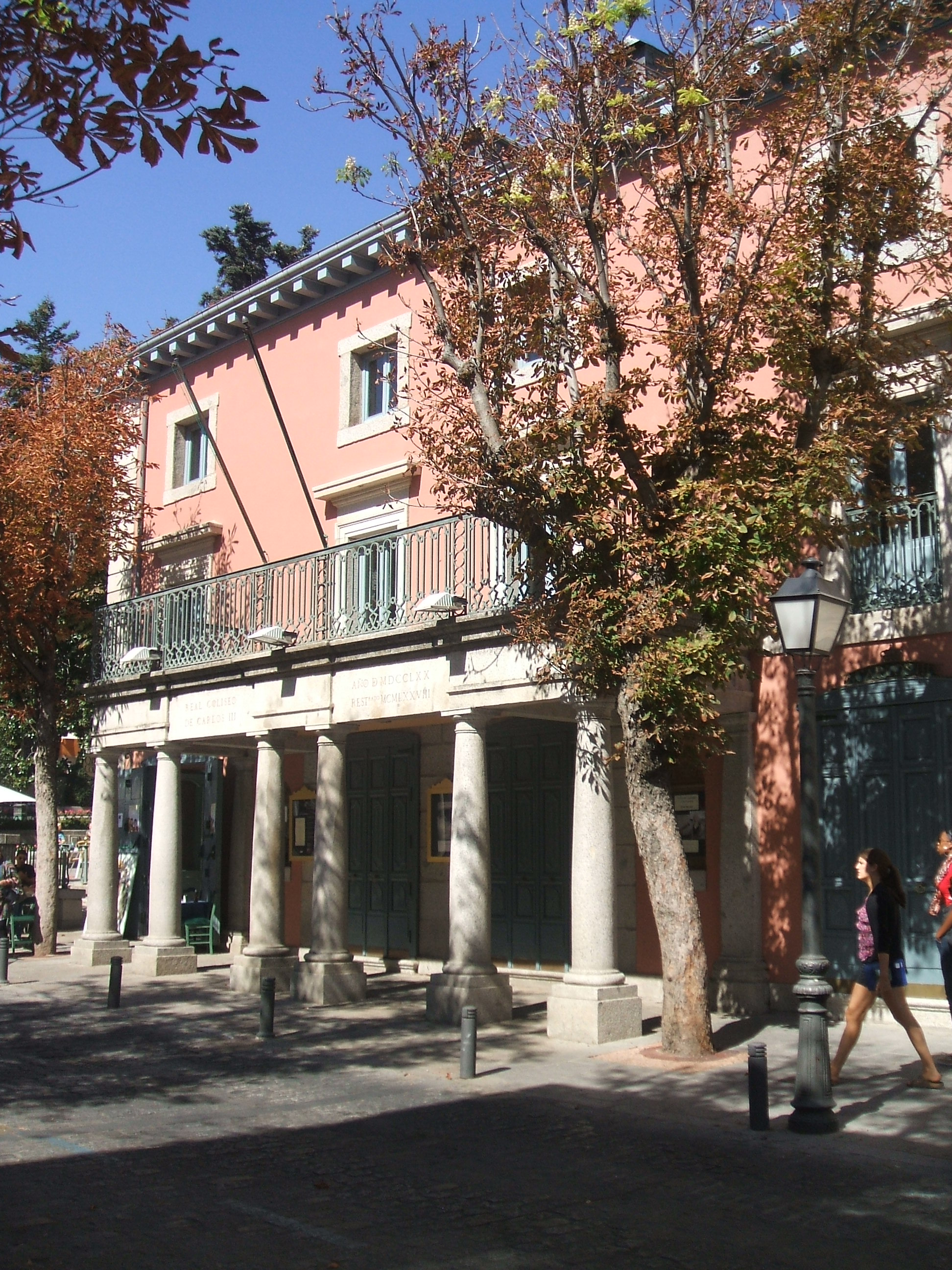
Teatro Real Coliseo de Carlos III of San Lorenzo del Escorial.

Molly, his wife, pharmaceutical, ran a pharmacy Pilar de Zaragoza Street of Madrid, being objet numerous gatherings, other poets were also pharmacists, and so in combined his work with poetry, was the case of Federico Muelas, a pharmacy Gravina Street of Madrid, there in his back room -which called the Ateneo - came together including Camilo José Cela, Gerardo Diego, etc. And Rafael Palma, who had another pharmacy Gaztambide Street of Madrid, which also met in chat. Even José María Fernández Nieto, was a pharmacist in Palencia. All this resulted in 1974 would create a Spanish Pharmacists Association and Arts (AEFLA), registered on April 15, 1974, leaving Frederick Wheeler President and Vice President Rafael Palma.

...And, every day poetry

In the 1970s, his poems appear in the newspaper ABC, section ... and poetry, every day, with many poems such as cities:

- Soria.
- Palencia.
- Patio de comedias de Almagro, the other referring to Los Cómicos.
- Francisco de Quevedo.
- Lope de Vega.
- Tribute to Íñigo López de Mendoza, 1st Marquess of Santillana, entitled Razón para el Marqués.
- Tribute to Góngora, Glosas a don Luis.
- Fusulamientos de Moncloa.

Not forgetting the city where he was born, in the late 50s, palentinos poets will give you glare in his life, working in Rocamadour magazine, which through its director, José María Fernández Nieto, is Juan José Cuadros, to contribute their poems, thoughts and criticisms, which will be a large magazine estimated the 60s. With the book Navanunca, born Rocamador collection.

== Works ==
=== Influence ===
His move to Baeza in 1941, and continue living there the figure of Antonio Machado, soon to be an object of admiration, Baeza was very present in Machado's work, including weekly recited his poems, and some of them were recorded in the memory. Machado was the basis or beginning of that love of poetry.

Juan José felt very identified with Jorge Manrique, the similarity of matches between the two poets is palpable, as he warned, and his early years in the Sierra de Segura, his transfer to the prison of Baeza, which compares with an internship at the Institute of Baeza, and mother's maiden name of Molly, his wife, and the wife of Jorge, both of Ayala, and Guiomar Menesses de Ayala.

=== Evolution ===
ESTE AMOR NO ES LO QUE ERA

Entonces tenía más claros
los ojos, el talle de lirio silvestre,
la frente más alta,
su largo cabello de oro
dejaba en la piel de los labios
un recuerdo de miel de romero
y flor de granado.

Juan José Cuadros

His poetic evolution unfolds gradually, seeking perfection in the arts, for it draws on a rich reading the classics, and the traditionalism of the Castilian, sticking its purity, and leaving aside the modernisms own language evolution. So leave a little aside his first two publications, and is not published until the number one collection Rocamadour, Navanunca, and later The Siege, when she starts by taking off, taking another lift and another vision in his work, which is transformed into the subsequently published.

His arrival in Madrid, will be the start of that poetic maturity in his work-this is mainly due to large capital resources offered, and the friendships and relationships that emerge, one of them, Ramon de Garciasol, great friend and family, with their experience and countless tips. And mainly the contact locals and especially poets Palencia, being part of the magazine Rocamadour, reaches that maturity.

His works are divided between Poetry and Prose. Considered as a poet of the second postwar generation.

=== Poetry ===
His poetry is original, with personality, express your feelings, reeling and pulling the juice of what he writes. Undecided on the principles of his poetry, and, what is slowly improving its quality, value and skill pen, driving a religious language and rich, yet simple and enjoyable. Leave marked a path coupled with a technique increasingly admirable.

Ramón Garciasol describes him as "a branch trunk Andalusian manriqueño output."

- Niño sin amigos (1959)
- Aquí se dice de un pueblo (1960)
- Navanunca (1961)
- El Asedio (1963)
- Recado de buen amor (1968)
- Memoria del camino (1975) Premio González de Lama (1974)
- Vuelta al Sur (1977)
- Los últimos caminos(1984) Premio Antonio Camuña (1983)

posthumous

- El único camino (1991)
- Caminos (antología poética) (1993)

=== Prose ===
- El libro de Guindalera (1992)
- Tiempo rescatado (1999)
- Al amor de los clásicos (2008)

=== Travel books ===
- Viaje a la Sierra de Segura (1990)
- Por los cerros de Úbeda (1998)
- Por tierra de pan amar (2000)

=== Publications ===
- Claro favor (1966)
- Inéditos (1993)
- Árbol del paraíso (2008)

=== Other ===
- La ciudad dormida (Baeza) (1961)
- En torno a una elegía: verte o no verte, de Rafael Alberti (1964)
- Castilla en la poesía (1980)
- Unas cuantas palabras para hablar de Miguel (1989)
