= Siles, Spain =

Siles
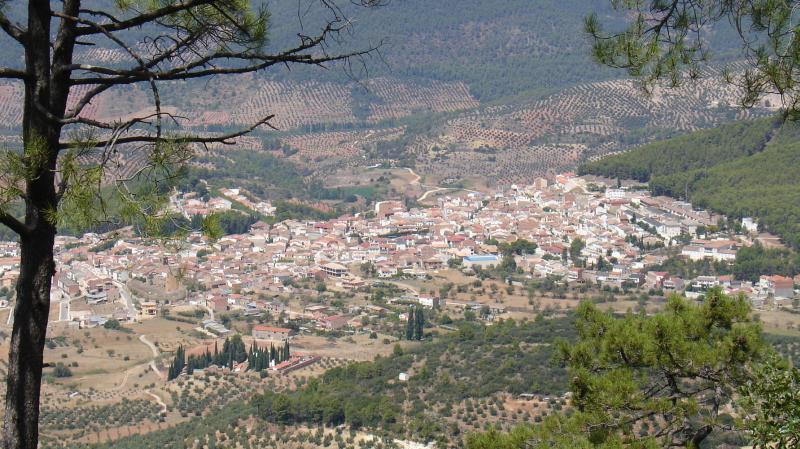

- Coat of arms

- Location in the Province of Jaén Siles, Spain (Andalusia) Siles, Spain (Spain)
- Coordinates: 38°23′20″N 2°34′50″W
- Country: Spain
- Autonomous community: Andalusia
- Province: Jaén

Area
  - Total: 175 km^{2} (68 sq mi)
- Elevation: 826 m (2,710 ft)

Population (2025-01-01)
  - Total: 2,067
  - Density: 11.8/km^{2} (30.6/sq mi)
- Time zone: UTC+1 (CET)
  - Summer (DST): UTC+2 (CEST)

Siles is a Spanish town and municipality in the province of Jaén, in the autonomous community of Andalusia, located in the region of Sierra de Segura, bordering the province of Albacete. It has a population of 2,451 inhabitants according to the last available census (INE2011). Much of the municipality is located within the Natural Park of Sierra de Cazorla, Segura and Las Villas. Because of its location it is a mostly forest town near the river, farmland focusing mainly olive grove, in a strip of southwest-northeast direction including the vicinity of the town center and the municipal enclave that owns the town northwest of the region.

The economy is based on agriculture (olive) and tourism, contributing to it also forest harvesting and sheep farming. The area contains natural spaces, which together with flora and fauna contributes to tourism in the municipality.

== Etymology ==
As to its etymology, perhaps the name comes from the many Siles silos found in the immediate Cerro San Cristobal, or Latin Sileo (silence), then, in effect, as the villa is tucked into a quiet valley between hills.

== Physical Geography ==
Siles is 160 km from Jaen, 101 km from Ubeda and 29 km from Segura de la Sierra, Siles being one of the main entrances to the Sierra in the province of Albacete, entering Riopar. Is represented in two sheets of MTN50: 865 (2001) and 887 (1978). The main population center appears in the worksheet 865.3 Being its coordinates: 38 ° 23'N 35'W 2nd

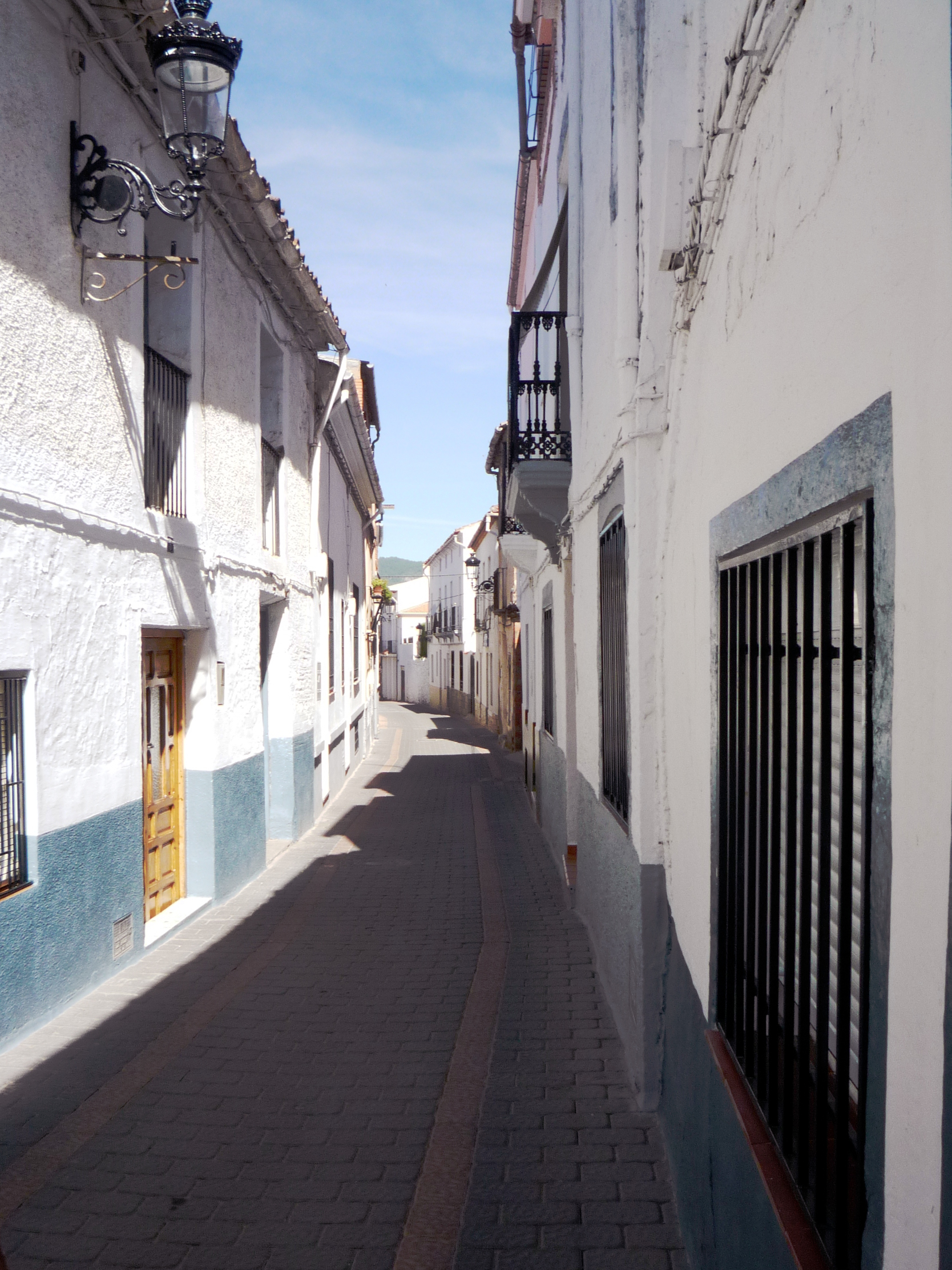
Street of Siles

== History ==
In times of al-Andalus Siles was a thriving population, mentioned in chronicles as Silis. It had a castle-fortress, which was one of the most important defensive strongholds in the control of the roads from the east. Apart from this castle in his term had other strengths that reinforced its strategic position: Peñafleita, Tasca and the fortified town of Peña Horadada. Silis was part of Saqura District (Segura), belonging to the Cora Yayyan (Jaén). According chronic concern in the Islamic period the Sierra de Segura it was populated by numerous villages, places of refuge forts and castles.

In the late twelfth century, with the formation of various Taifa kingdoms, this square was disputed by the Zirids of Granada and Almeria King Ibn Sumadih who gripped Silis in 1076-1077, but was soon changed by agreement to Ziries.

Siles was conquered around 1230 by the Knights of the Order of Santiago in command of the master Pelayo Perez Correa and went to swell the vast dominion of the Order based in Segura de la Sierra.

After the conquest, Siles maintained its strategic importance, of what gives a thorough account of the siege episode Yusuf I of Granada in 1339, with 1,500 knights and 6,000 infantry Moors.

Christian army commanded by Master Santiago Alonso Melendez de Guzman, got the attackers to lifted the siege, which if it was successful, it would have jeopardized not only the brand but also the Advancement of Cazorla. Belonged to the Kingdom of Murcia and party of Segura, Order of Santiago and depended on the Chancery of Granada and the Diocese of Cartagena.

In 1397, he was awarded the privilege of Villa. This title awarded for her single and its expense is encircled by walls and built three towers. He was later confirmed by Philip II of Spain during his reign. The fence had three towers, plus a main strength, which in turn had two other large towers. Between the two towers was the house and next to it the church was built.

In this house lived Rodrigo Manrique, Jorge Manrique father for a long time. The presence of Don Rodrigo in Siles motivated the population to their strength and they were involved in the noble struggles of the fifteenth century.

In the mid-nineteenth century the strength was still standing: the town of Siles was divided into two, the oldest part called Villa was surrounded by walls, which kept up its battlements and three gates. The rest of the village was called New Town.

== Places of interest ==
The most recognized sites by tourism of Siles are Peña del Olivar, Las Acebeas, El Puntal, el Saltador or la Fresnedilla.

- La peña del Olivar: Playground, where in addition to preparing a meal outdoors, you can tour the adjacent Botanical Gardens.
- Las Acebeas: This place takes its name from rare forest of hollies that populates the place, the wettest of the whole region and the second Andalusian behind Grazalema.
- El Puntal: It is located just opposite Siles (1200m) high. At the top there is a booth from which firefighters monitor summer to monitor so that no fire occurs. From there the panorama of Siles, La Fresnedilla, etc. are observed.

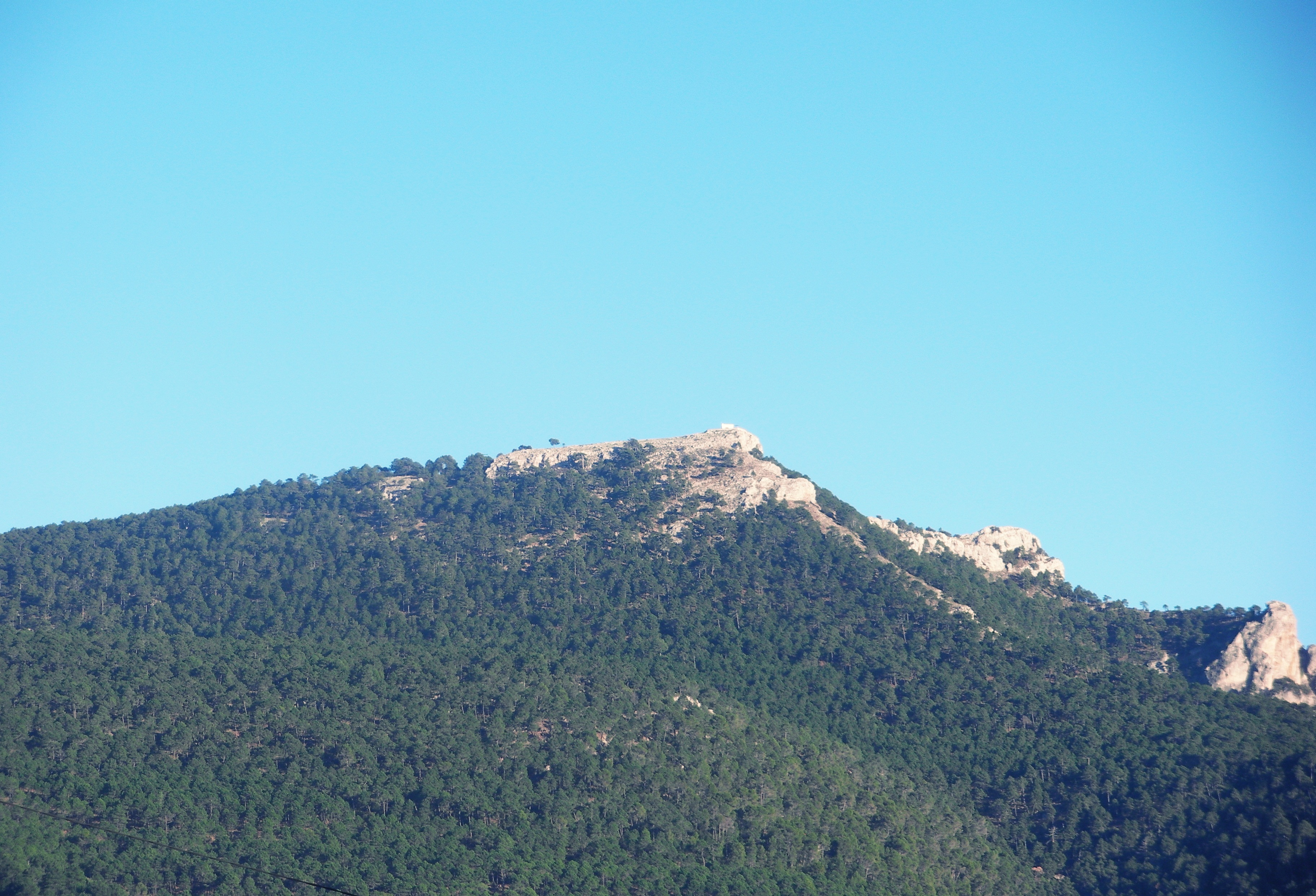
Siles, El Puntal

- Fresnedilla: In which we can observe the Stone Hole. It is fitted with large pine trees and undergrowth. It already lost the olive trees, the breadth of the valley and soft floors, to give the narrow valleys.

== See also ==
- List of municipalities in Jaén
