= Sierra de Cazorla (disambiguation) =

Sierra de Cazorla, a mountain range of the Prebaetic system

Sierra de Cazorla may refer to:

- Sierras de Cazorla, Segura y Las Villas Natural Park, a protected area in Spain
- Sierra de Cazorla (comarca), a comarca in Jaén Province, see Córdoba, Spain
