= Banderilla =

Banderilla is a diminutive meaning small flag (bandera) in the Spanish language and may refer to:

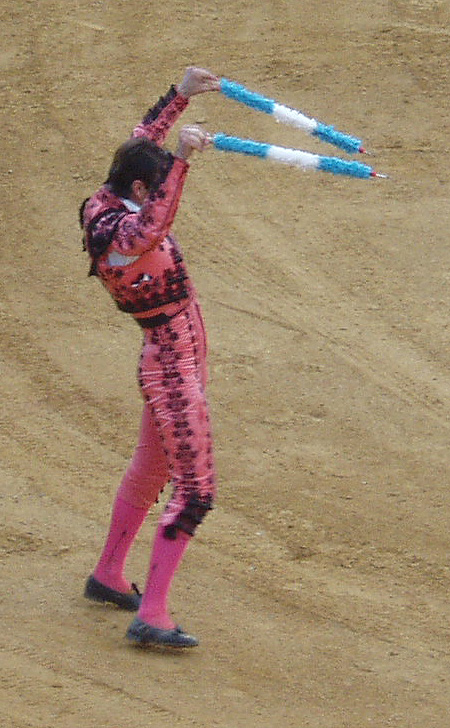
A banderillero is a type of barbed stick used by a torero or toreador

- "Banderilla" (in the English language) most often refers to the colorfully decorated and barbed sticks used in bullfighting, as illustrated on this page
- A banderilla is a type of Spanish tapa (appetizer) mounted on a wooden skewer
- In Mexico, a corn dog is known as a banderilla
- Las Banderillas, rising to 1993 meters above sea level, the highest mountain in the Segura de la Sierra, Spain
- Banderilla, Veracruz, a municipality in the State of Veracruz, Mexico
- The plant Salvia splendens, which has bright red flowers, is sometimes known as a Banderilla
