= Hornos =

- Municipality
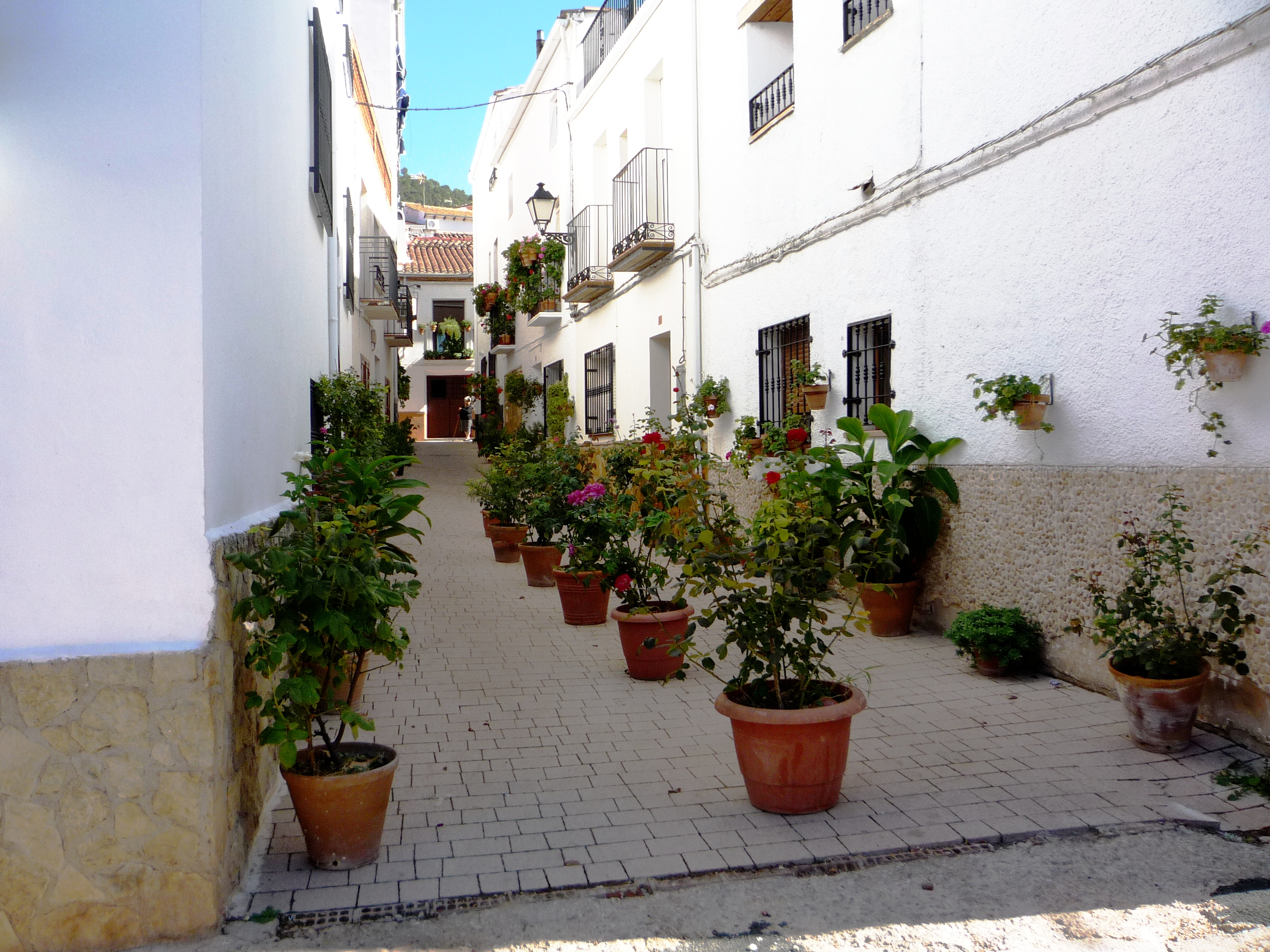
- Flowers in the narrow streets and squares of the old town of Hornos.

- Coat of arms

- Location in the Province of Jaén Hornos (Andalusia) Hornos (Spain)
- Coordinates: 38°13′N 2°43′W
- Country: Spain
- Autonomous community: Andalusia
- Province: Jaén
- Municipality: Hornos

Area
  - Total: 118 km^{2} (46 sq mi)
- Elevation: 865 m (2,838 ft)

Population (2025-01-01)
  - Total: 561
  - Density: 4.75/km^{2} (12.3/sq mi)
- Time zone: UTC+1 (CET)
  - Summer (DST): UTC+2 (CEST)

Hornos is a municipality located in the province of Jaén, Spain. According to the 2005 census, the city has a population of 657 inhabitants.

== See also ==
- El Tranco de Beas Dam
- Sierra de Segura
- List of municipalities in Jaén
