= Villacarrillo =

- municipality
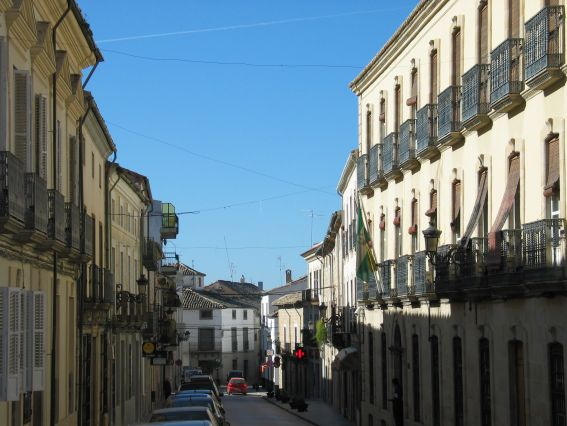
- Fair street in Villacarrillo

- Flag Coat of arms

- Location in the Province of Jaén Villacarrillo (Andalusia) Villacarrillo (Spain)
- Coordinates: 38°06′N 3°05′W
- Country: Spain
- Autonomous community: Andalusia
- Province: Jaén
- Comarca: Las Villas

Area
  - Total: 239 km^{2} (92 sq mi)
- Elevation: 812 m (2,664 ft)

Population (2025-01-01)
  - Total: 10,342
  - Density: 43.3/km^{2} (112/sq mi)
- Time zone: UTC+1 (CET)
  - Summer (DST): UTC+2 (CEST)

Villacarrillo is a locality and Spanish municipality located in the south-western part of the region of Las Villas, in the province of Jaén. It borders the municipalities of Santisteban del Puerto, Iznatoraf, Villanueva del Arzobispo, Santiago-Pontones, Santo Tomé, Úbeda (by the enclave known as Rincón de Úbeda), and Sabiote.

The municipality includes the population centers of Villacarrillo - which hosts the capital of the Las Villas region -, Mogón, La Caleruela, Agrupación de Mogón y Arroturas. It has a population of 10,902 inhabitants.

== Economy ==
Villacarrillo is known as a centre of olive oil production in Spain, with the world's largest olive oil mill, capable of processing 2,500 tonnes of olives per day, located in the municipality. More than 70% of Spain's olive oil production takes place in the Jaén province, of which Villacarrillo is a part.

== See also ==
- List of municipalities in Jaén
