= Villanueva del Arzobispo =

- Municipality
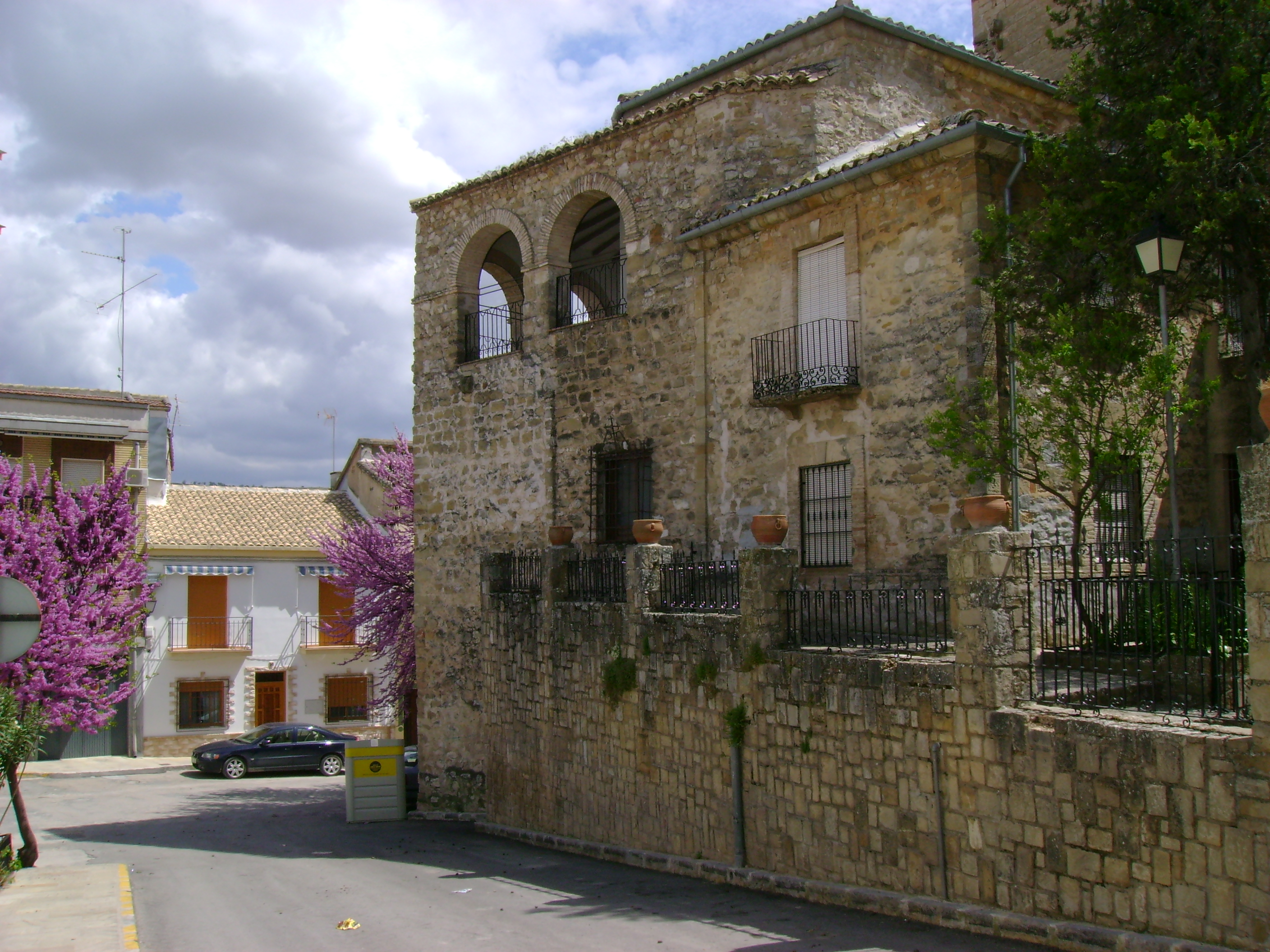
- Iglesia de San Andrés in the town.

- Flag Coat of arms

- Location in Andalusia
- Coordinates: 38°10′0″N 3°0′0″W
- Country: Spain
- Autonomous community: Andalusia
- Province: Jaén
- Comarca: Las Villas
- Municipality: Villanueva del Arzobispo

Area
  - Total: 177.38 km^{2} (68.49 sq mi)
- Elevation: 688 m (2,257 ft)

Population (2025-01-01)
  - Total: 7,703
  - Density: 43.43/km^{2} (112.5/sq mi)
- Time zone: UTC+1 (CET)
  - Summer (DST): UTC+2 (CEST)
- Website: Villanueva del Arzobispo - Inicio

Villanueva del Arzobispo is a city located in the province of Jaén, Spain. According to the 2011 census (INE), the city had a population of 8,924.

== History ==
The town was first mentioned in the year 1396 owing to a petition made by Pedro Tenorio, archbishop of Toledo, to King Henry III of Castile. Hence the town's name, which means New Town of the Archbishop in Spanish. Before this date, the town was called La Moraleja, adjacent to Iznatoraf and towards the beginning of the 13th century formed part of the conquered territory of Cazorla.

There exist basic forms of the ancient name of the locality, which before being called La Moraleja was called in Arabic Al-Buxarressa, from which La Moraleja derives.

The urban nucleus of Villanueva del Arzobispo is situated next to the mountain of Albercones, to the west, at a crossroads. It presents a mixed picture, with some ancient districts made up of irregular roads and blocks of houses, and others with blocks more or less in a regular pattern which conforms to the more modern extended area. In the ancient quarter, situated in the west part of the centre, there are various roads with steep inclinations. The towns development basically radiated from the centre to the north-east and south-east, following the line marked by the highway 322 and by the way to the park. To the west the presence of the arroyo of the Pozo has prevented further urban expansion.

King Philip II imposed criminal jurisdiction on the town in 1573. However, in the 20th century, the town was given the title of city by King Alfonso XIII in 1920.

== Notable buildings ==
With a distinctive artistic history various buildings, places of great ecological importance and enclaves with a rich heritage include:

- Iglesia parroquial de San Andrés (Parochial church of Saint Andrew), built on the ruins of a former mosque in the 16th century.
- Santuario de la Virgen de la Fuensanta (Sanctuary of the Virgin of the Holy Springs) which receives the patronage of the Four Towns (Villanueva del Arzobispo itself, along with Iznatoraf, Villacarrillo and Sorihuela del Guadalimar).
- Iglesia de la Vera Cruz (Church of the True Cross), in which is a statue of Jesus by the sculptor Mariano Benlliure.
- Convento de Santa Ana (Convent of Saint Anne), a baroque construction with a Renaissance cloister of the 16th century.
- Plaza de Toros (Bullring), designed by architect Mr Angel Arbex and built in 1928 in neo-Moorish style.
- Casa de los Arcos (House of the Arches), early 20th-century building with Moorish-style interior.
- Ermitas del Calvario (Hermitage of Calvary), founded by Saint John of the Cross in 1576.

== Economy ==
Agriculture is dominated by the olive. Currently, four grades are used in the work in making the olives into olive oil.

The quality of the waters of the Sierra de Cazorla is considered sufficient for the installation of a mineral water bottling industry.

Other important industries include San Miguel Arcángel and the biomass plant La Loma (generation of energy from olive skins and other olive products).

The cultivation of cereals is very small, largely substituted by the olive.

== See also ==
- List of municipalities in Jaén
