= Beas de Segura =

Beas de Segura, Spain
- town
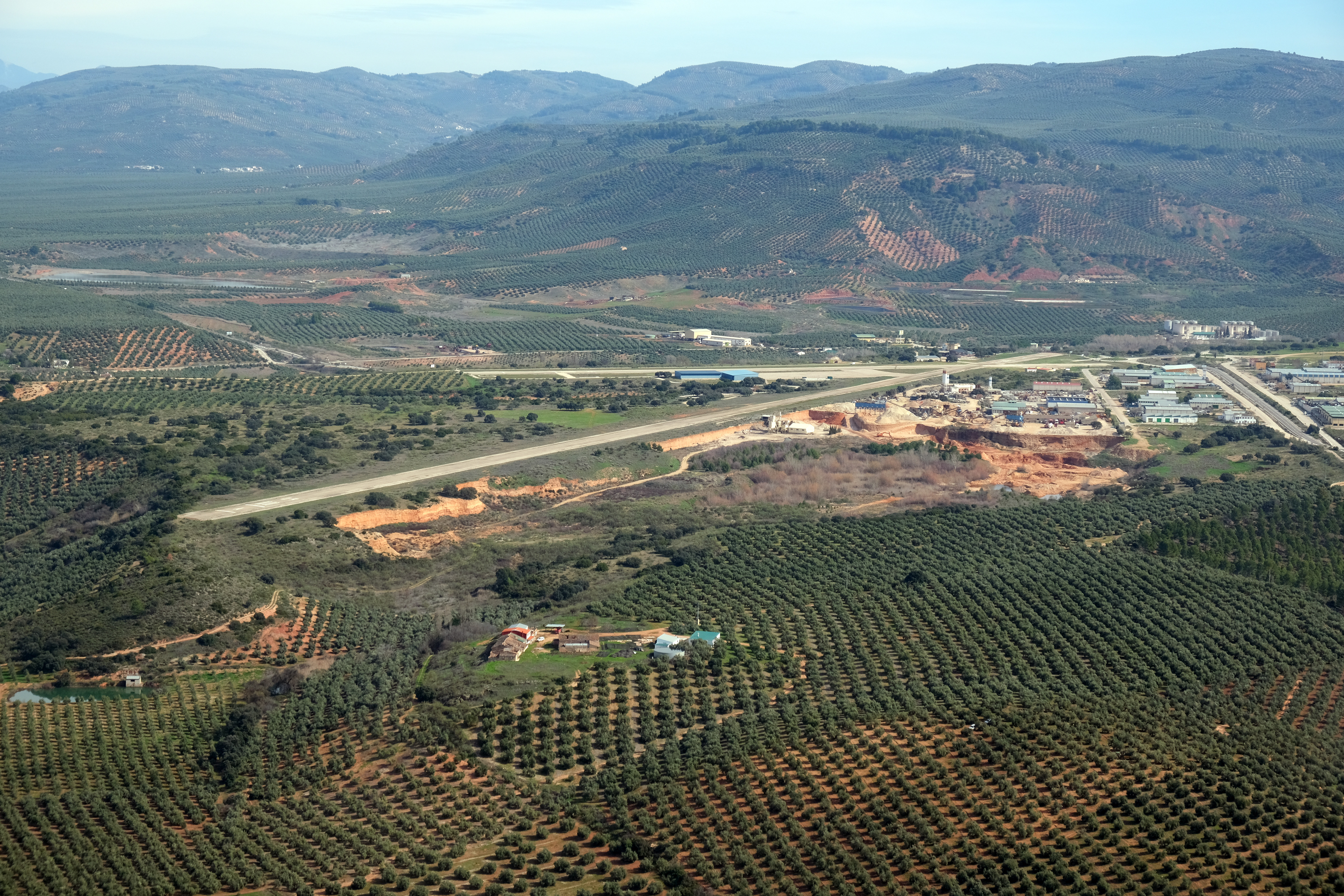

- Flag Coat of arms

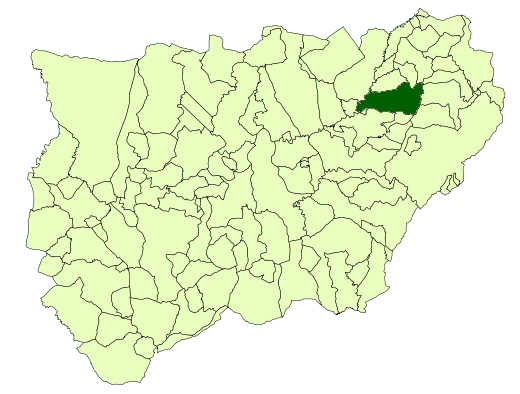

- Location in the Province of Jaén Beas de Segura (Andalusia) Beas de Segura (Spain)
- Coordinates: 38°15′N 2°53′W
- Country: Spain
- Autonomous community: Andalusia
- Province: Jaén
- Municipality: Beas de Segura

Area
  - Total: 155 km^{2} (60 sq mi)
- Elevation: 600 m (2,000 ft)

Population (2025-01-01)
  - Total: 4,983
  - Density: 32.1/km^{2} (83.3/sq mi)
- Time zone: UTC+1 (CET)
  - Summer (DST): UTC+2 (CEST)

Beas de Segura is a town located in the province of Jaén, Spain. According to 2024 INE figures, the town had a population of 4,968 inhabitants.

Beas de Segura is part of the Sierra de Segura, with almost a quarter of its territory within Sierras de Cazorla, Segura y Las Villas Natural Park. As of 2019, Beas de Segura has an area of 159.25 km^{2}. As of 2016 its padrón municipal registered a population of 5,380 inhabitants, making it the most populated municipality in the region, as well as a center of influence over the neighboring towns.

The majority of its lands are agricultural areas dedicated mainly to the production of olive oil, which is why it is integrated into the Jaén province of the Spanish Association of Olive Producing Municipalities (AEMO). Its olive oil production has allowed its oil industry to be included in the Sierra de Segura denomination of origin. Olive oil production, livestock ranching, and tourism constitute Beas de Segura's main economic activities.

== History ==
The first vestiges of human civilization in the area date from the Lower Paleolithic, when small groups of humans lived on the banks of the Guadalimar River. No human skeletal remains have been found, but a rich lithic industry has been found at Puente Mocho, some of whose tools are displayed at Madrid's Museo Nacional de Ciencias Naturales and the Museo de Jaén. As of 1979, the Puente Mocho lithic industry is considered among the oldest of its kind in Andalusia.

From the Roman era remain the ruins of the Puente Mocho over the Guadalimar River. It is said that Saint Teresa of Ávila crossed this bridge on her way to Seville after founding Convento de Carmelitas Descalzas (Beas de Segura), the first such convent in Andalusia. The convent of Beas was declared as an Asset of Cultural Interest on April 25, 1979, and years later, on March 22, 1983, was inducted into the General Catalog of Andalusian Historical Patrimony.

For centuries Beas de Segura has hosted festivities in honor of San Marcos from April 22 to April 25, the principal of which is the so-called toro ensogao ("bull on a rope"). This festival was declared an Andalusian "Festival of National Touristic Interest" in 2008.

== See also ==
- List of municipalities in Jaén
