= Las Villas =

Coordinates: 38°6′N 3°5′W

- Comarca
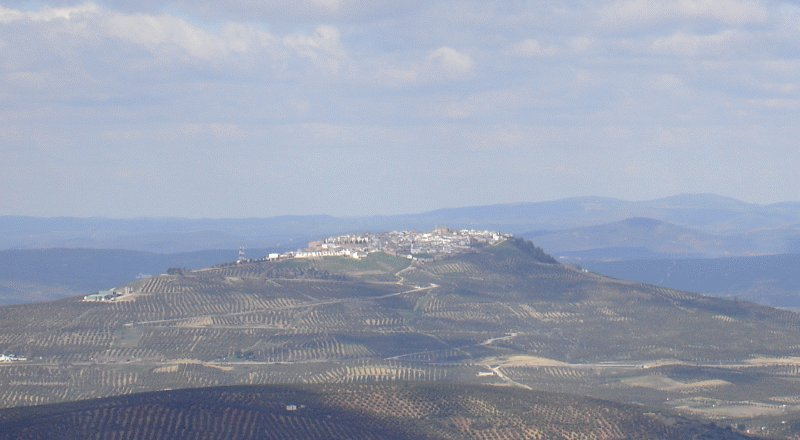
- Landscape of Las Villas at Iznatoraf.

- Location of Las Villas in Andalusia
- Country: Spain
- Region: Andalusia

Area
  - Total: 556.38 km^{2} (214.82 sq mi)
- Elevation: 800 m (2,600 ft)

Population
  - Total: 22,023
  - Density: 39.583/km^{2} (102.52/sq mi)

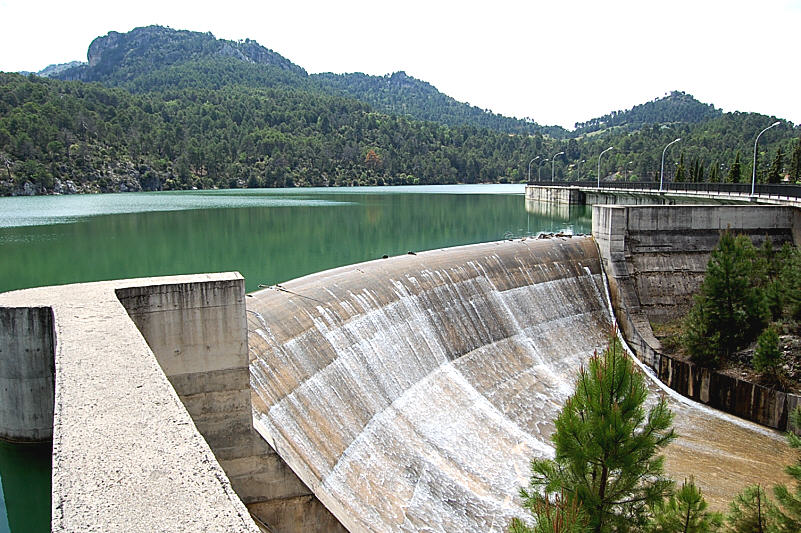
View of Aguascebas dam

Las Villas is a natural region and comarca in Andalusia, southern Spain. It is located in the mountainous area at the eastern end of Jaén Province. The main town is Villacarrillo.

Together with the Sierra de Cazorla and Sierra de Segura mountain ranges Las Villas gave its name to the Sierras de Cazorla, Segura y Las Villas Natural Park that was established in 1986. 8.3 percent of the surface of the protected area falls within the Las Villas comarca.

Formerly the Las Villas comarca had been merged with La Loma as La Loma y las Villas, an administrative division of Andalusia. The present-day official comarca was established in 2003. According to the 2014 census, the comarca has a population of 22,023 inhabitants.

== Municipalities ==
- Iznatoraf, 1038 inhabitants.
- Sorihuela del Guadalimar, 1298 inhabitants.
- Villacarrillo, 11,092 inhabitants.
- Villanueva del Arzobispo, 8595 inhabitants.

== See also ==
- Comarcas of Andalusia
- Baetic System
