= Antonio Tavira y Almazán =

Antonio Tavira
- Born: Antonio Tavira y Almazán; 30 September 1737; Iznatoraf (Jaén), Spain
- Died: 7 January 1807 (aged 69); Salamanca, Spain

Seat A of the Real Academia Española
- In office 23 November 1775 – 7 January 1807
- Preceded by: José Abreu Bertodano
- Succeeded by: Eugenio de la Peña

Antonio Tavira y Almazán, (Iznatoraf, Jaén, 30 September 1737 - Salamanca, 7 January 1807) was a Spanish Bishop who belonged to the large group of enlightened ecclesiastics that emerged in Spain during the second half of the 18th century. He served as a professor of rhetoric in Salamanca and was a member of the Royal Spanish Academy from 1775 to 1807.

== Biography ==
Born in a family of rural nobility, the future Jansenist-leaning bishop displayed, from childhood, a great aptitude for study, a pursuit he began under the tutelage of his highly cultured father, who served as his guide and mentor during his early education.
In 1772, aged 36, he was appointed Honorary Chaplain of King Charles III of Spain. He was also a Knight and a Prior of the Military Order of Santiago in Uclés, province of Cuenca in 1788–1789.

In Uclés, he was accompanied by Juan Antonio Fernández, who was to carry out the management of the main archive of the Order of Santiago. Fernández learned of the existence of the Roman ruins at the nearby spot of Cabeza del Griego ("Segobriga") and undertook the first archaeological excavations with Tavira.

He became Bishop of Canarias, (1791–1796), Bishop of Osma, (1796–1798) and Bishop of Salamanca, (1798–1807). He was ordained a bishop of Salamanca by the Scottish Priest Alexander Cameron.

He was a very close friend of Minister Gaspar Melchor de Jovellanos, suspicious of the Spanish Inquisitors at the end of the 18th century whom he suspected of incompetence and connivence with the French regalist, "constitutionalist" and "bonapartist" Bishop Henri Grégoire (Abbé Grégoire).

As a Bishop, he had some clashes with the Spanish Inquisition, related to the regalist wishes of King Carlos IV of Spain to intervene in the bishop's jurisdiction on the annulment of marriages.
