= Coto Ríos =

Coordinates: 38°02′N 2°50′W

Coto Ríos (often pronounced with a silent 's') is a village in the northeastern part of Jaén Province, Andalucía, Spain. It is located in the middle of Sierras de Cazorla, Segura y Las Villas Natural Park. Its geographical location is about 40 kilometres from the nearest town, Cazorla. Coto Ríos is 640 metres above sea level and has about 340 inhabitants. It is popular for excursionists and travellers, who often use it as a starting place for long walks through the national park. It is also popular for the camping, camping Chopera. Coto Ríos is not served by a bus line, but can be reached by car or taxi.

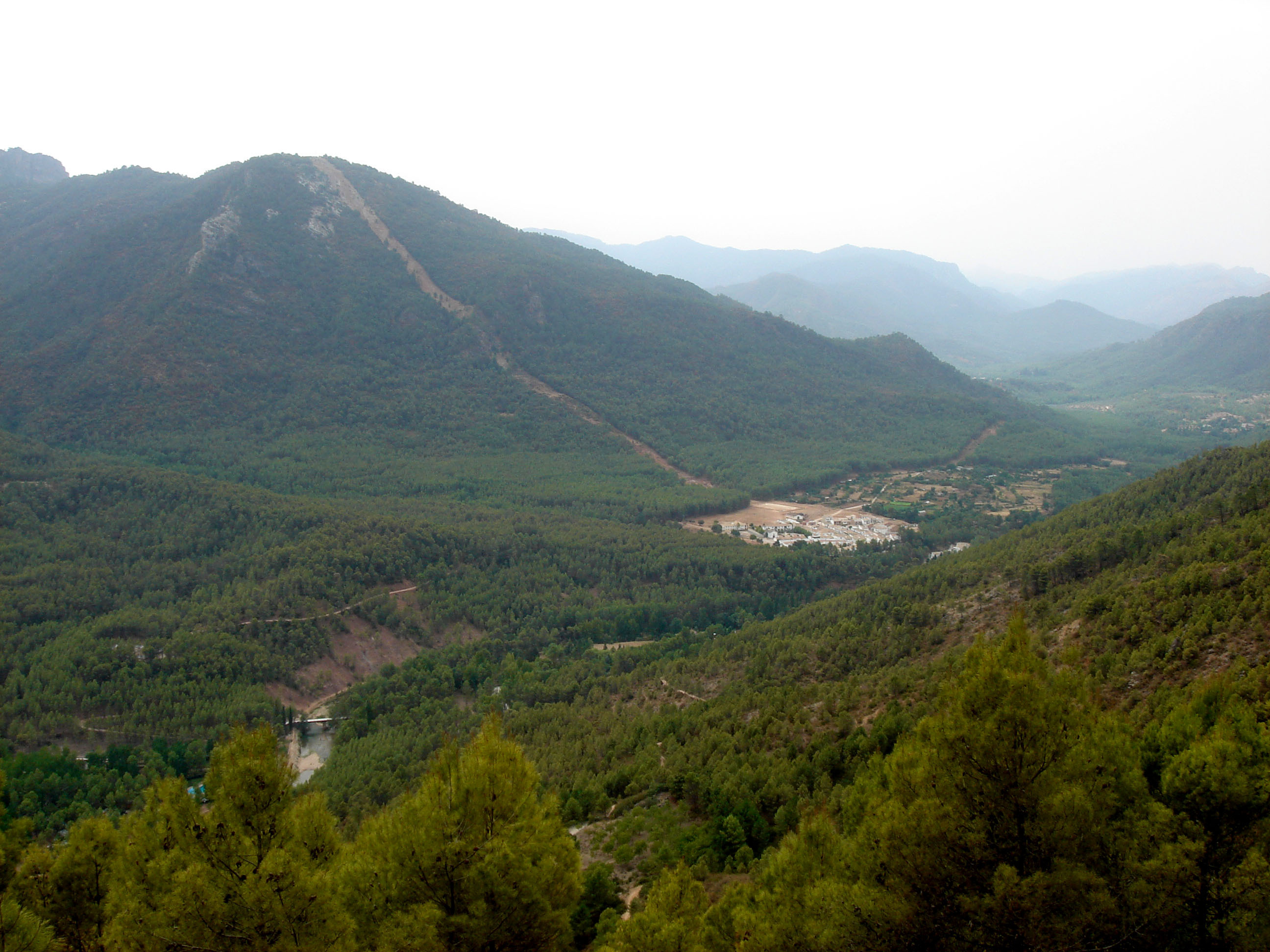
Coto Ríos from the climb to the Hoya de Miguel Barba
