= Segura de la Sierra =

- Municipality
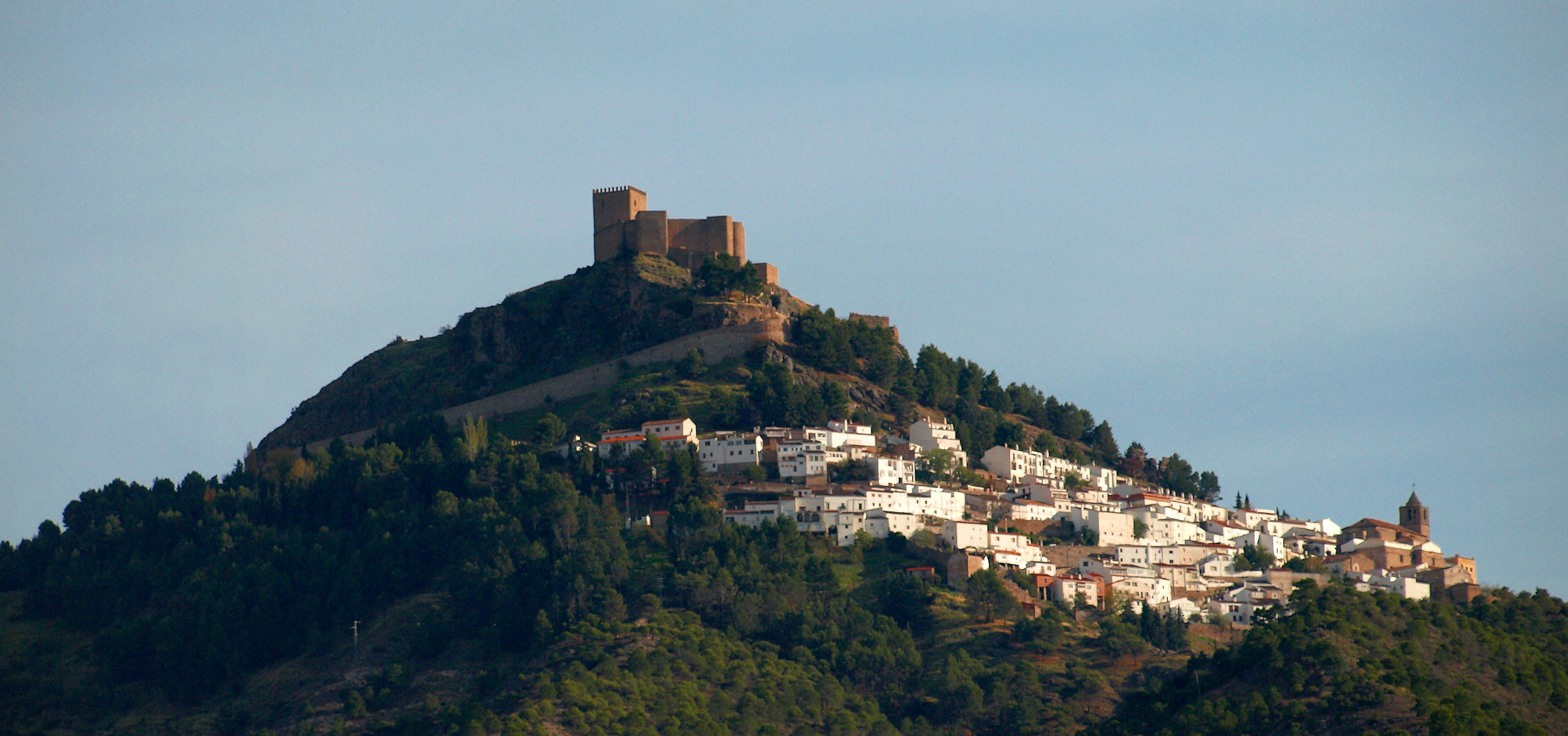
- The Town and its castle

- Coat of arms

- Location in Spain Segura de la Sierra (Andalusia) Segura de la Sierra (Spain)
- Coordinates: 38°18′N 02°39′W
- Country: Spain
- Autonomous community: Andalusia
- Province: Jaén
- Comarca: Sierra de Segura

Government
  - Alcalde: Jacinto Jesús Viedma Quesada (PSOE)

Area
  - Total: 224 km^{2} (86 sq mi)
- Elevation: 1,145 m (3,757 ft)

Population (2025-01-01)
  - Total: 1,711
  - Density: 7.64/km^{2} (19.8/sq mi)
- Demonym(s): Segureño, ña
- Time zone: UTC+1 (CET)
  - Summer (DST): UTC+2 (CEST)
- Postal code: 23379
- Dialing code: (+34) 953 48 XX XX
- Official language(s): Spanish
- Website: Official website

Segura de la Sierra is a small village in the province of Jaén, (Spain), that belongs to the region of Sierra de Segura in eastern Andalusia.

According to data provided by Spain's national statistics agency, Instituto Nacional de Estadística de España (INE), in 2005 there were 1,771 people living in the town, all them located in the Sierras de Cazorla, Segura y Las Villas Natural Park that includes the following villages:

- Cortijos Nuevos
- El Ojuelo
- Carrasco
- La Alberquilla
- El Robledo
- Rihornos
- Trujala
- Arroyo frío
- Río Madera and Arroyo Canales
- Catena
- El Tobazo
- El Puerto

== History ==
The most important period for Segura de la Sierra was during the Arab occupation, when the town was called Saqura (شقورة). The village was conquered in 781 AD by Abul-Asvar who was responsible for building the several walls that surround the town. People were under the rule of the walíes serving the Córdoba kings.

After fighting between the Almohads, the Christians took the control and the king Alfonso VIII donated the village to the military Order of Santiago, many nobles and personalities were born or lived there in those days, including the poet Jorge Manrique.

After it was taken by the Castilian troops, part of its inhabitants resettled in the city of Safi, where they are known to this day by last name Shequri.

With the invasion of Napoleon's troops, the town was set on fire and most of its Archive was destroyed, losing a great part of the history of the village that will never be recovered.

== Monuments ==
Segura de la Sierra was designated in 1972 Conjunto Histórico-Artístico.

The village offers, in essence, the same physiognomy it had in the past, reflected in its silent and picturesque streets.

The most important monument is the Mudéjar Castle, placed on top of the town and surrounded by the ancient walls.

The Fountain of Carlos V decorated with its shield is close to the Church of Nuestra Señora del Collado that has a nice painting of the Descendimiento by Gregorio Hernández and a Romanic sculpture of the Virgen de la Peña.

The old School of the Jesuitas with its plateresca façade was restored and now holds the town Council.

Finally the Arabian baths from the 11th century have also been restored and can now be visited.

== Local festivities ==
The major local celebration is the festivity of the Virgen del Rosario between the 4 and 8 October that mixes religion and culture, those days the town had many people coming from other close villages.

During the day people enjoy the bull fightings in the Arabian square placed down the Castle and the competition of Bolos serranos. The party filled the night with much music and dancings that was typical pasodobles.

== See also ==
- List of municipalities in Jaén
