= Las Banderillas =

Mountain in Southern Spain

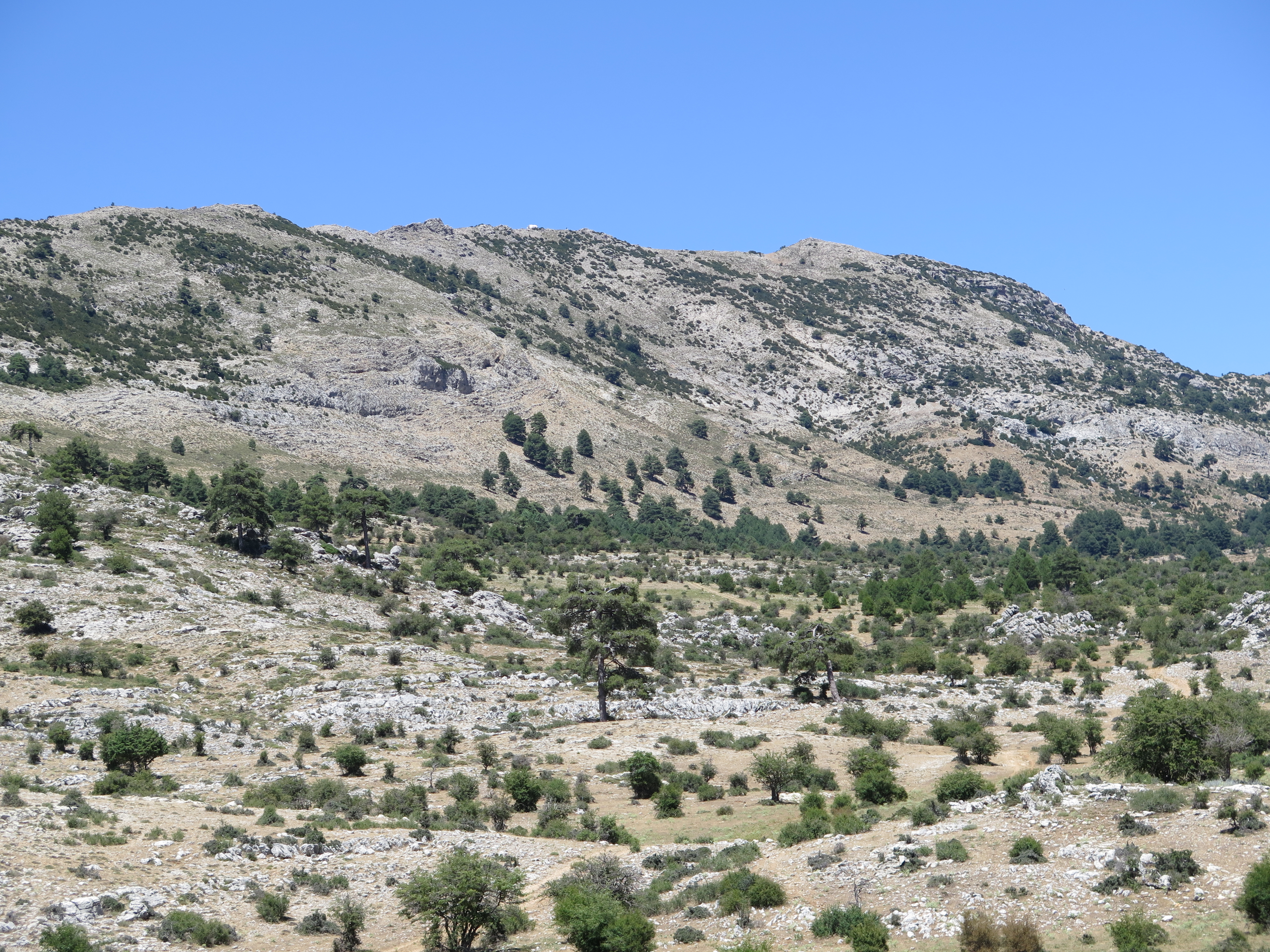
- Las Banderillas seen from the East

Highest point
- Elevation: 1,993 m (6,539 ft)
- Coordinates: 38°01′N 2°47′W

Geography
- Location within Spain
- Location: Jaén, Spain
- Parent range: Sierra de Segura

Climbing
- First ascent: unknown
- Easiest route: Hike

Las Banderillas or Cerro de las Banderillas, height 1993 m, is the highest mountain in the Sierra de Segura, a mountain range in Southern Spain.

The Sierra del Segura cordillera, along with Sierra de Cazorla, is part of the Pre-baetic System. Both mountain chains are included in the Sierras de Cazorla, Segura y Las Villas Natural Park.

Las Banderillas is often partly covered with snow in the winter. Its western face is a sheer cliff overlooking the Aguamulas River valley and la Campana Brook. Its eastern side, on the other hand, descends less abruptly towards the Pinar Negro and Campos de Hernán Perea plateaus.

This mountain can be explored through various scenic hiking trails. There is a shack on the Las Banderillas mountaintop containing forest-firefighting equipment.
