= Manuel Carrión =

Spanish footballer

Personal information
- Full name: Manuel Carrión Rodríguez
- Date of birth: 19 July 1978 (age 48)
- Place of birth: Ibi, Spain
- Height: 1.75 m (5 ft 9 in)
- Position: Left back

Youth career
- Alcoyano

Senior career*
Years	Team	Apps	(Gls)
1998–2001	Alcoyano		
2001–2002	Ontinyent		
2002–2012	Alcoyano	238	(6)
2012–2014	Orihuela	74	(0)
2014–2019	Rayo Ibense	138	(1)
- * Club domestic league appearances and goals

Manuel Carrión Rodríguez (born 19 July 1978) is a Spanish former footballer who played as a left back.

Rodrigues started his career with CD Alcoyano and played from 1998-2001, before joining Ontinent CF for a season. In 2002 he returned to Alcoyano in 2002, and played as a defender for the next decade. In 2012, he signed with Orihueka FC, and was in 74 matches on two seasons. He ended his career with UD Rayo Ibense, and played from 2014 until he retired in 2019.
