= Sorihuela del Guadalimar =

- Municipality
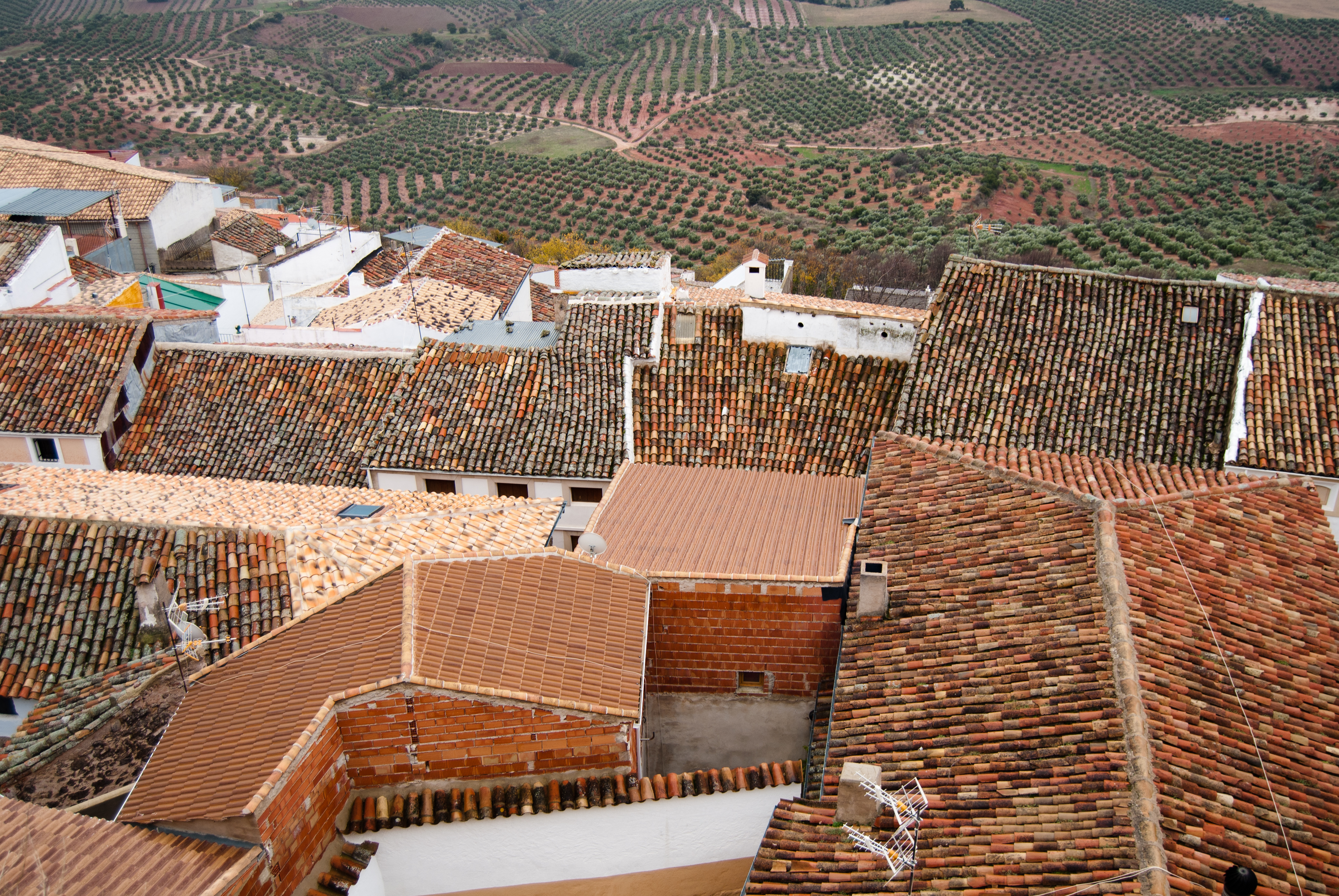

- Flag Coat of arms

- Location in the Province of Jaén Sorihuela del Guadalimar (Andalusia) Sorihuela del Guadalimar (Spain)
- Coordinates: 38°14′N 3°03′W
- Country: Spain
- Autonomous community: Andalusia
- Province: Jaén
- Comarca: Las Villas

Area
  - Total: 54 km^{2} (21 sq mi)
- Elevation: 647 m (2,123 ft)

Population (2025-01-01)
  - Total: 1,000
  - Density: 19/km^{2} (48/sq mi)
- Time zone: UTC+1 (CET)
  - Summer (DST): UTC+2 (CEST)

Sorihuela del Guadalimar is a municipality located in the province of Jaén, Spain. According to the 2005 census (INE), the municipality has a population of 1258 inhabitants.

== See also ==
- List of municipalities in Jaén
