= El Tranco de Beas Dam =

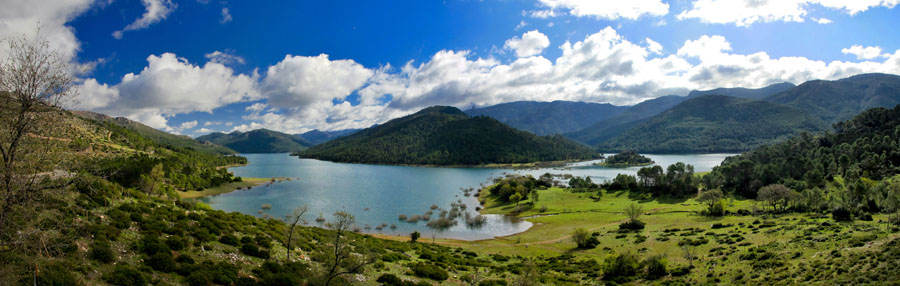
- View of the reservoir

- Location within Andalusia
- Location: Hornos
- Coordinates: 38°8′0″N 2°47′0″W
- Type: reservoir
- Primary inflows: Guadalquivir
- Basin countries: Spain
- Built: 1929
- First flooded: 1948
- Surface area: 1,800 ha (4,400 acres)
- Water volume: 498 hm^{3} (404,000 acre⋅ft)
- Surface elevation: 670 m (2,200 ft)

El Tranco de Beas Dam, also known as Pantano del Tranco, is a reservoir across the high Guadalquivir in the Sierra de Segura range, Andalusia, Spain.

== See also ==
- List of reservoirs and dams in Andalusia
