= Iznatoraf =

- Municipality
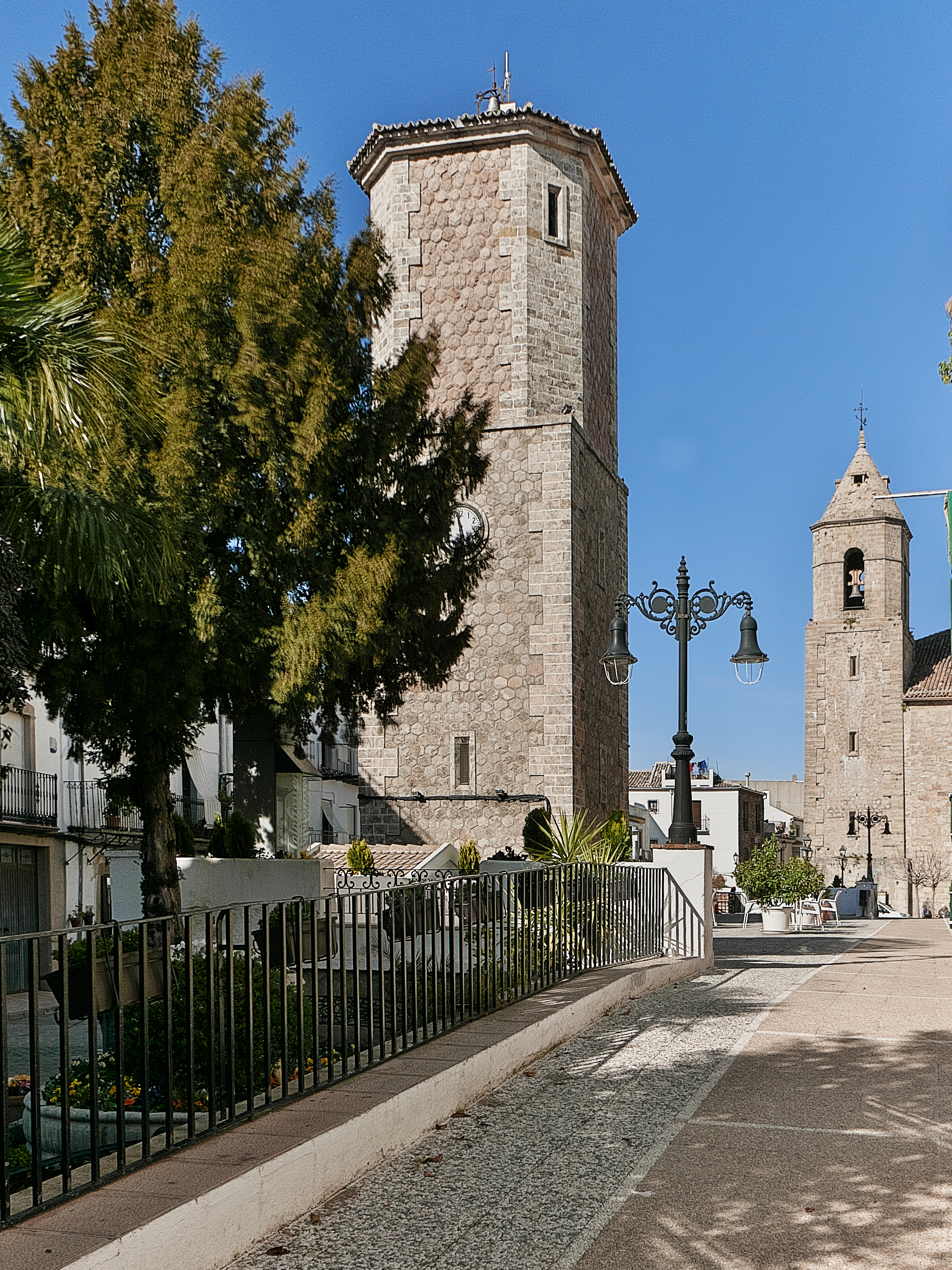

- Flag Coat of arms

- Location in the Province of Jaén Iznatoraf (Andalusia) Iznatoraf (Spain)
- Coordinates: 38°9′N 3°2′W
- Country: Spain
- Autonomous community: Andalusia
- Province: Jaén
- Comarca: Las Villas

Area
  - Total: 86.54 km^{2} (33.41 sq mi)
- Elevation: 1,036 m (3,399 ft)

Population (2025-01-01)
  - Total: 874
  - Density: 10.1/km^{2} (26.2/sq mi)
- Time zone: UTC+1 (CET)
  - Summer (DST): UTC+2 (CEST)

Iznatoraf is a municipality located in the province of Jaén, Spain. According to the 2005 census, the municipality has a population of 1188 inhabitants.

== See also ==
- Sierra de Cazorla
- Antonio Tavira y Almazán
- List of municipalities in Jaén
