= Sierra de Segura =

Mountain range in the Jaén Province in Spain

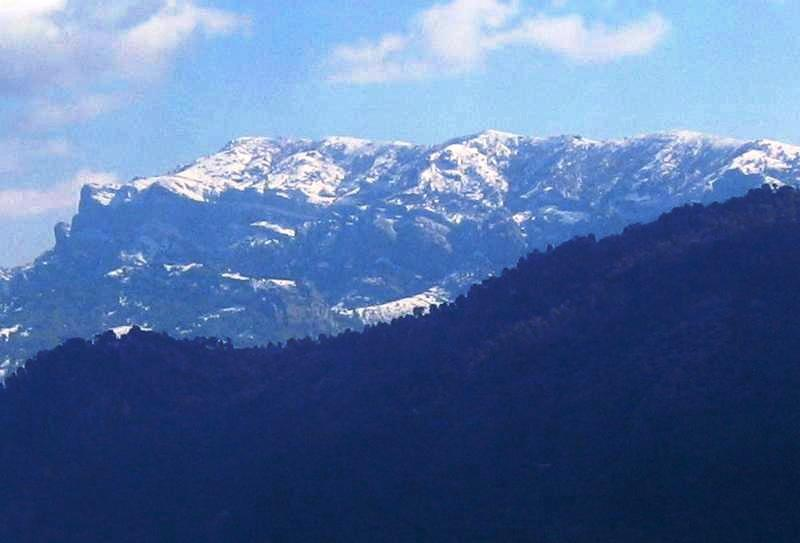
- View of Las Banderillas peak in Sierra de Segura

Highest point
- Elevation: 1,993 m (6,539 ft)
- Coordinates: 38°01′00″N 02°47′00″W

Geography
- Location within Spain
- Location: Province of Jaén, Spain
- Parent range: Prebaetic System

Geology
- Mountain type: Limestone

Climbing
- Easiest route: From El Tranco de Beas Dam

Sierra de Segura is a mountain range of the Prebaetic System in the province of Jaén in Spain. It is named after the ancient town of Segura de la Sierra and it gives its name to the Segura river. Its highest point is the 1,993 m high Las Banderillas peak.

This mountain range is surrounded by the Sierra Nevada, the Sierra de Cazorla, and Sierra de Baza mountain ranges. It gives its name to the Sierra de Segura Comarca, an administrative division that includes a number of villages that are scattered across the range.

== Protected area ==
The Sierras de Cazorla, Segura y Las Villas Natural Park is a protected area including about 80% of the Segura Range, as well as the neighboring Cazorla Range and some adjacent mountainous areas.

== See also ==
- Baetic System
- El Tranco de Beas Dam
- Las Villas
