= Sierras de Cazorla, Segura y Las Villas Natural Park =

Nature park in Province of Jaén, Spain

- Parque Natural de las Sierras de Cazorla, Segura y Las Villas
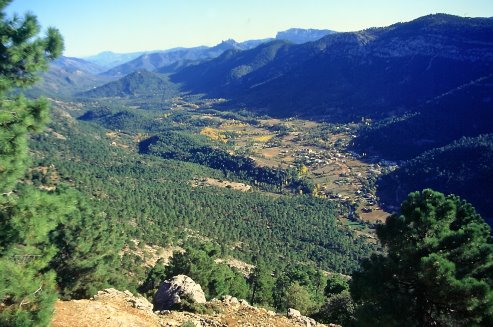
- View from the Puerto de las Palomas into the Guadalquivir valley and the village of Arroyo Frío before the 2001 fire.
- Interactive map of Sierras de Cazorla, Segura y Las Villas Natural Park
- Location: Province of Jaén (Spain)
- Coordinates: 38°05′00″N 2°45′00″W
- Area: 2,099.2 square kilometres (810.5 sq mi)
- Established: 1986
- Website: www.acazorla.com

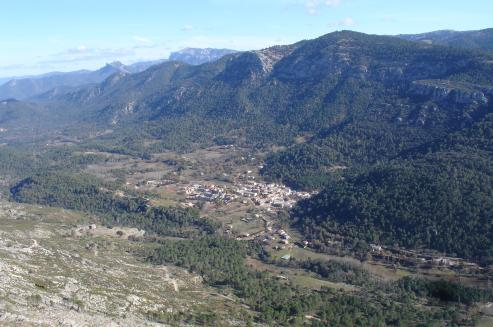
View from the Puerto de las Palomas into the Guadalquivir valley and Arroyo Frío after the 2001 fire.

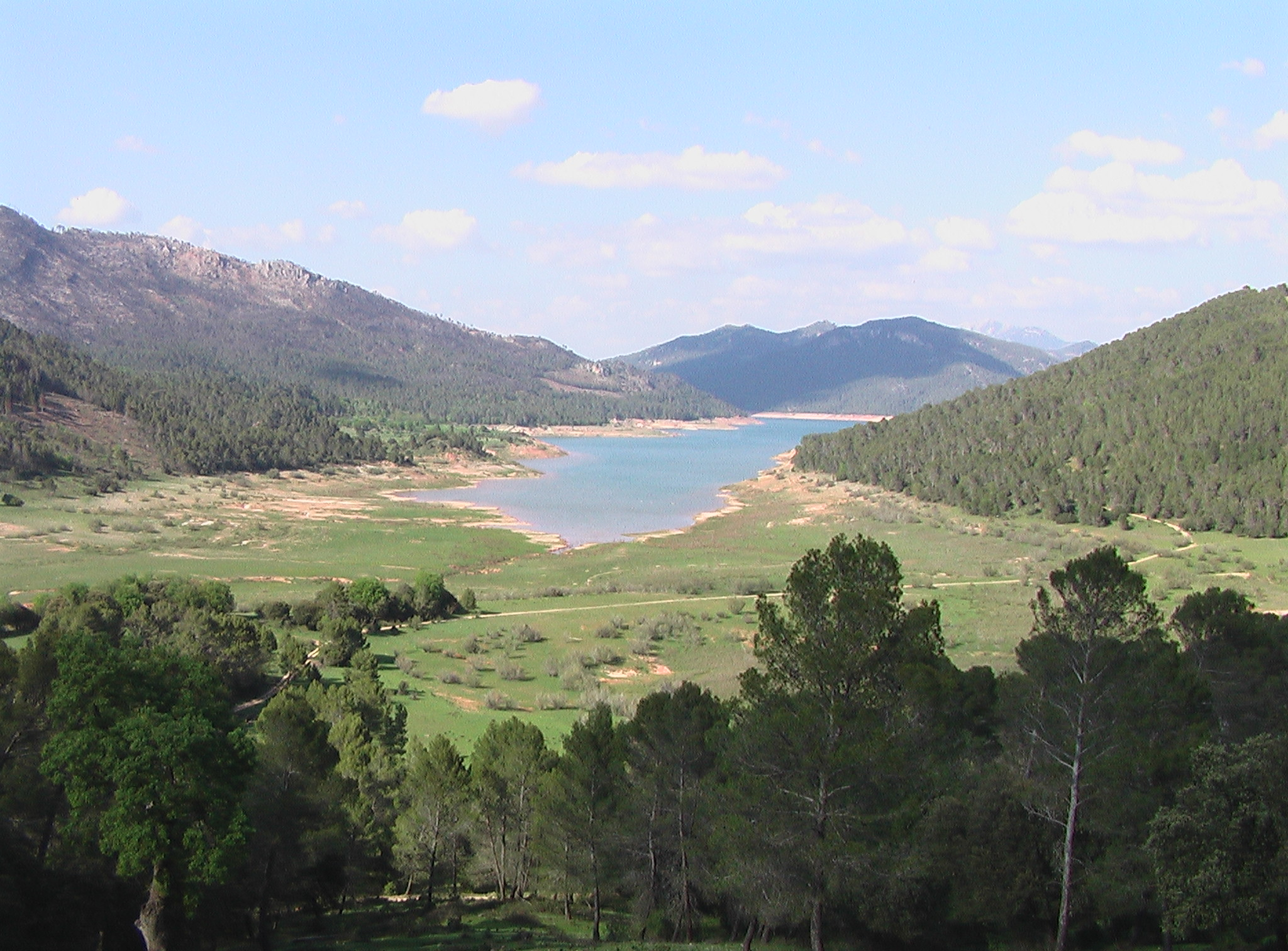
Tranco Reservoir (Pantano del Tranco), the largest in Jaén

Sierras de Cazorla, Segura y Las Villas Natural Park (Spanish: Parque Natural de las Sierras de Cazorla, Segura y Las Villas) is a natural park in the eastern and northeastern part of the province of Jaén, Spain, established in 1986. With an area of 2,099.2 square kilometres (810.5 sq mi), it is the largest protected area in Spain and the second largest in Europe. It was declared a biosphere reserve by UNESCO in 1983 and also a Special Protection Area for migratory birds in 1988.

== Protected area ==
Protection of roughly 700 square kilometres (270 sq mi) in the southern part of the park dates back to 1960, when the National Hunting Reserve of las Sierras de Cazorla y Segura (Coto Nacional de Caza de las Sierras de Cazorla y Segura) was established. Given its large area, embracing 23 municipalities with more than 80,000 inhabitants, the level of protection varies from one part of the park to another, allowing a diversity of economic activity in the majority of the territory.

The beauty of the countryside and the flora and fauna combine with a cultural heritage to make the region an important destination for tourism.

The park includes two high ranges, the Sierra de Cazorla and the Sierra de Segura. These mountain ranges are part of the Prebaetic System, the northernmost portion of the Baetic Cordillera. Generally running southeast-to-northeast, they meet up with the Sierra Morena that runs from this region west to Portugal. Between the mountain ranges are valleys, including the headwaters of the Guadalquivir, which—after initially heading some 50 kilometres (30 mi) northeast through the mountains—runs west to the Atlantic Ocean, but also of the Segura, which runs east to the Mediterranean.

Altitudes in the park range from 500 metres (1,600 ft) above sea level where the river Guadiana Menor flows out the southern boundary of the park to the 2,107-metre (6,913 ft) peak of Cerro las Empanadas. Other important peaks are Alto de la Cabrilla (2,078 metres (6,818 ft)), Cabañas (2,027 metres (6,650 ft)), Las Banderillas (1,993 metres (6,539 ft)), Aguilón del Loco (1,956 metres (6,417 ft)), Blanquillo or Pedro Miguel (1,830 metres (6,000 ft)), and El Yelmo (1,808 metres (5,932 ft)).

== Comarcas ==
The natural park is composed of municipalities of three comarcas of Jaén:

- The Comarca of Sierra de Cazorla, some 40 percent of whose terrain falls inside the park, constituting 24.5 percent of the park.
- The Comarca of Sierra de Segura, some 40 percent of whose terrain falls inside the park, constituting 67.1 percent of the park. 32.5 percent of the park falls within the single municipality of Santiago-Pontones.
- The Comarca of las Villas, constituting the remaining 8.3 percent of the park.

== Geology ==
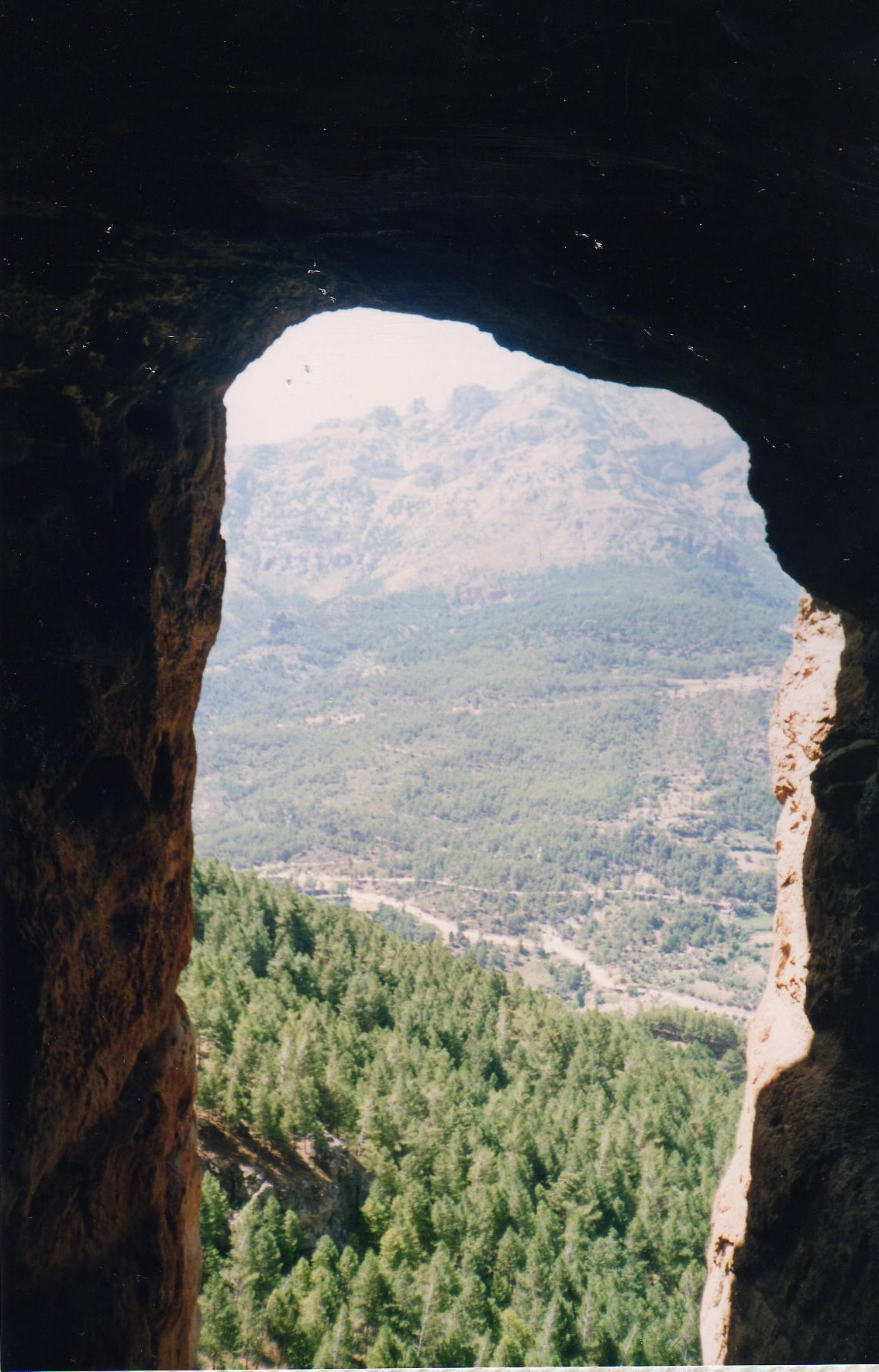
Los Anguijones Cave (seen from inside), Sierra de Segura.

Throughout the park are magnificent karstic formations of dolomitic limestone, formed by the dissolving action of water on the soluble stone. Examples include the baroque Cerrada de Elías and Salto de los Órganos in the Borosa River. La Toba has been described as a "haughty staircase to heaven" of pure white travertine, with labyrinthine caves of water along the right bank of the Segura in the hamlet of the same name. Or the Los Anguijones Caves on the right bank of this same river below the Anchuricas Reservoir, like two fantastic giants' abodes.

== Flora ==
Within these mountain ranges is Spain's largest continuous area of pine forest, with representatives of nearly all pine species found in the Iberian Peninsula, the most abundant being European black pine (Pinus nigra). These species were repopulated long ago and their growth has been aided by abundant rainfall. Beginning 900 metres (3,000 ft) above sea level are forests of Aleppo pine (Pinus halepensis), accompanied by strawberry trees (Arbutus unedo) and mastic (Pistacia lentiscus), more typical of the Mediterranean forests that once stood here. Yet higher are forests of holm oak (Quercus ilex), Portuguese oak (Quercus faginea), and gall oak (Quercus lusitanica), and important areas of maritime pine (Pinus pinaster). In the wettest areas are ancient yews (Taxus baccata) and European holly (Ilex aquifolium), both scarce in Andalusia. Along the rivers are ash, willows, and poplars as well as reeds and cattails that provide shelter to waterfowl and small mammals.

The park has some of the richest and most varied flora of the Mediterranean basin. More than 2,170 species have been catalogued, 34 exclusive to the territory, among these the Cazorla violet (Viola cazorlensis), the Cazorla geranium (Geranium cazorlensis or cazorlense), and the Cazorla columbine (Aquilegia pyrenaica subsp. cazorlensis), as well as two endemic species of narcissus. Also of note is the carnivorous butterwort Pinguicula vallisnerifolia.

Within the park is the Torre del Vinagre Botanical Garden, where representative plants of the region are on public display.

== Fauna ==
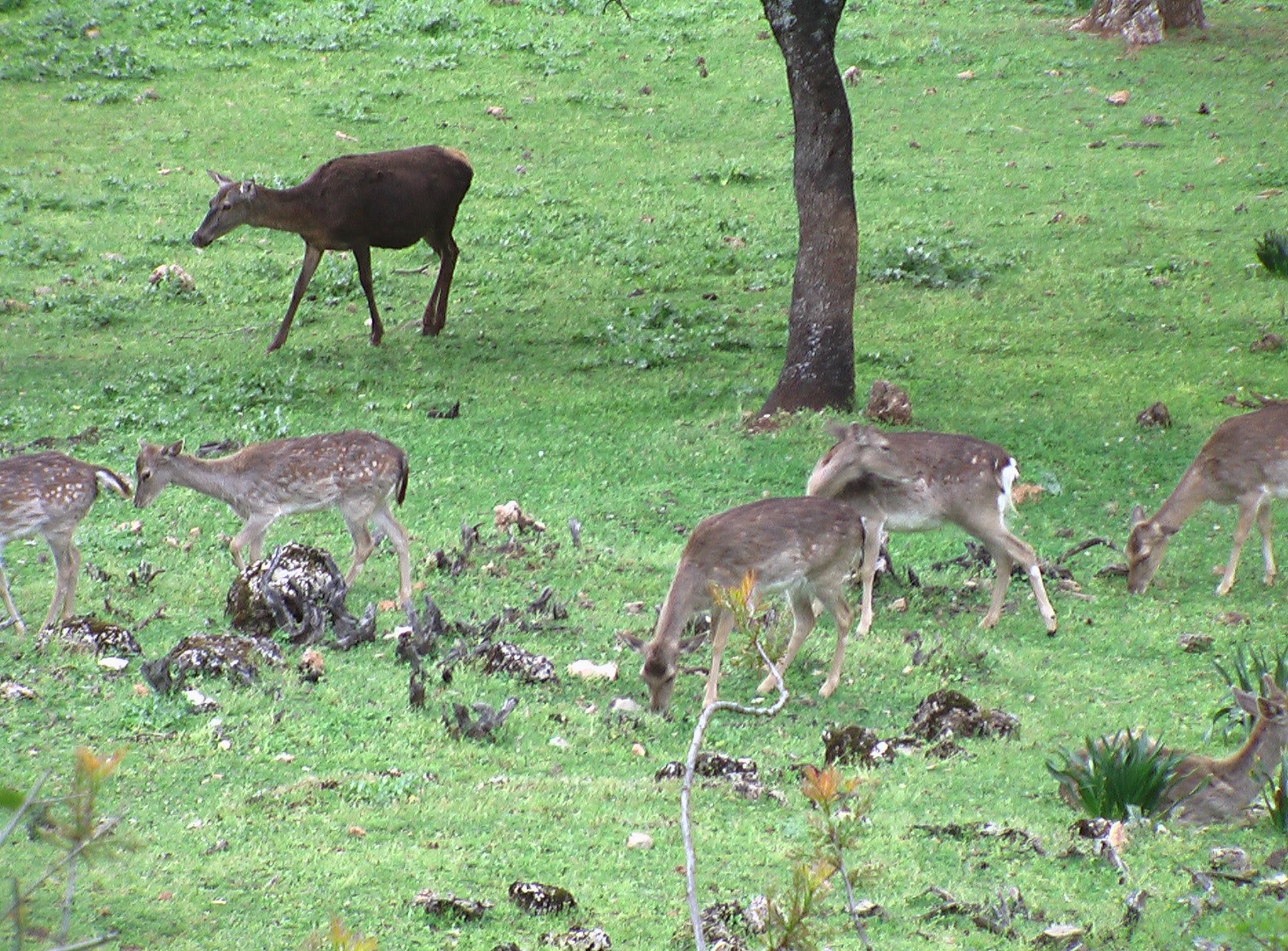
Deer in a hunting park

The variety of fauna in the park is also vast. There are 50 species of invertebrates found nowhere else. Among the 30 species of mammals living in the park are great number of deer, Spanish ibex (Capra pyrenaica) and wild boars (Sus scrofa), as well as important populations of mouflon (Ovis aries orientalis), a wild sheep, and fallow deer (Dama dama). Except for the Spanish ibex, these were introduced for hunting, and have caused some pressure on the native species. Wolves were also re-introduced in recent decades.

Among the 130 species of birds are the griffon vulture (Gyps fulvus) and the golden eagle (Aquila chrysaetos), as well as the bearded vulture (Gypaetus barbatus) in the process of repopulation.

The rock lizard known as the Spanish algyroides (Algyroides marchi) was discovered there in 1958. The park also has six species of amphibians.

== Human history ==
The park contains prehistoric Rupestrian painting sites, including in the Cuevas de Pardis near the Segura River, and there is evidence of Iberian settlements dating from 2000 BCE.

== Threat ==
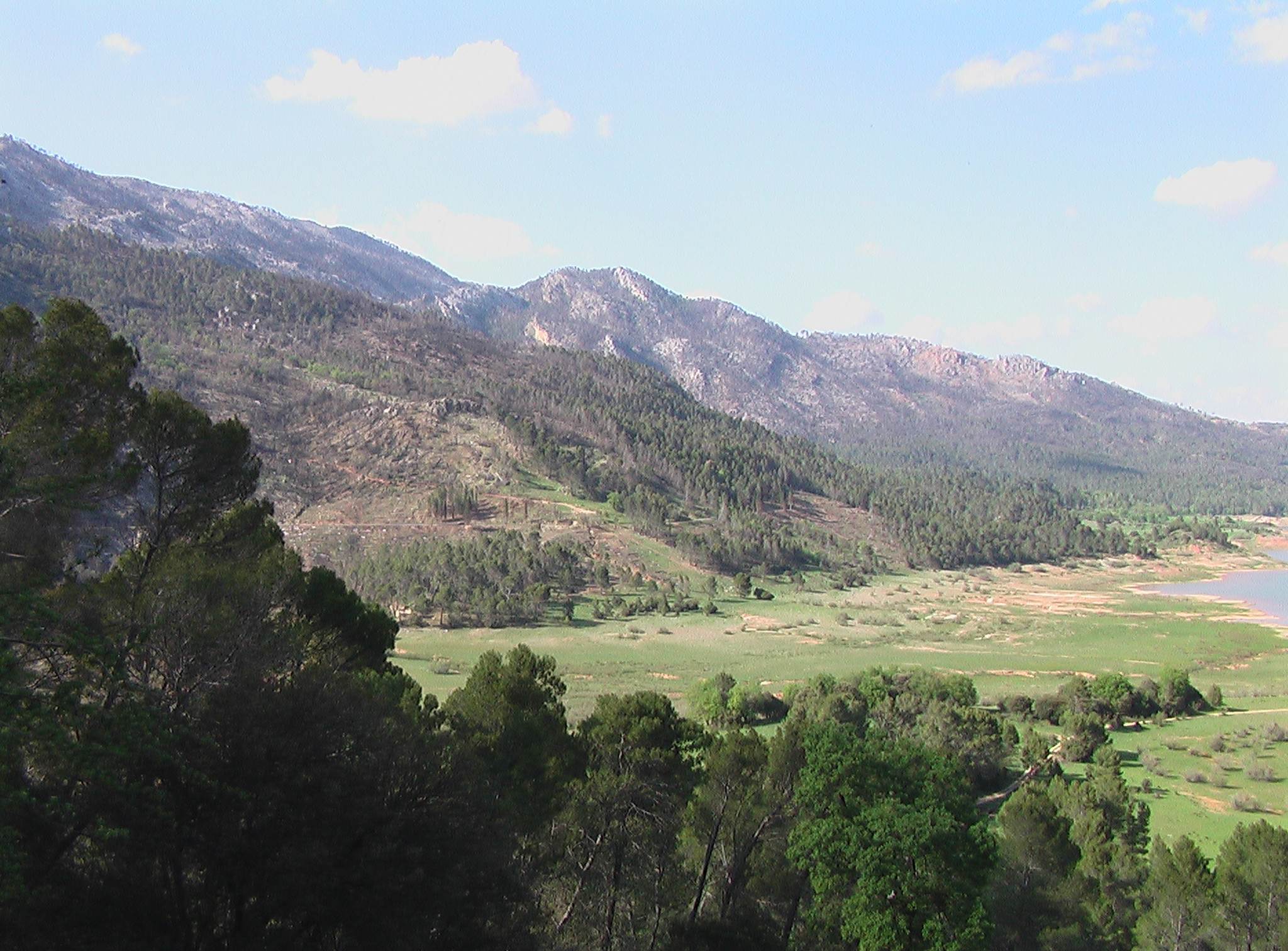
View after the fire of summer 2005

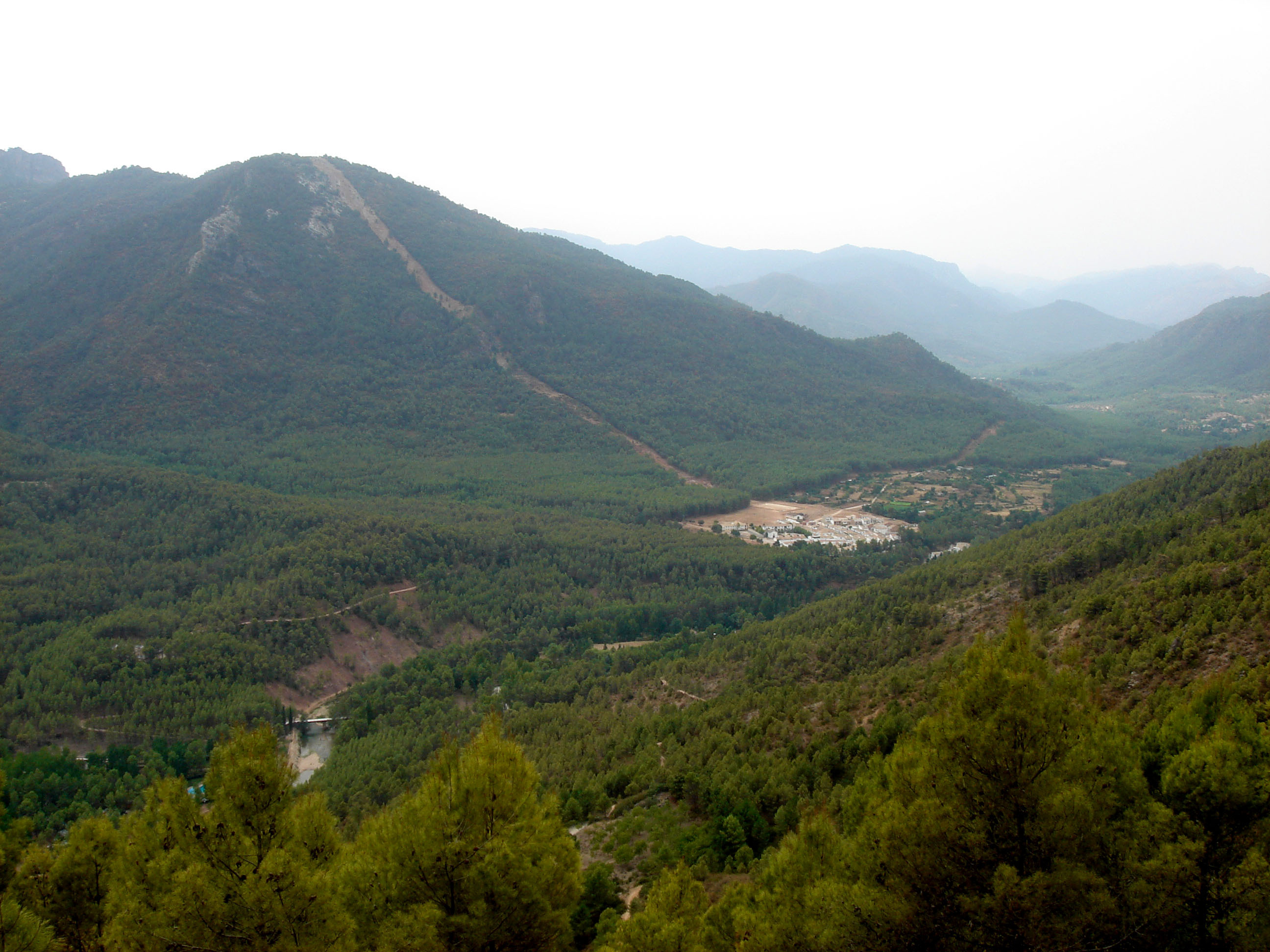
Coto Ríos from the climb to the Hoya (valley) de Miguel Barba

The chief threats to the park, as much for flora as for fauna, are the recurring forest fires, which have become more frequent and have had disastrous effects for some portions of the park. Development and human activity continue to be a grave threat, requiring a proportional increase in vigilance and firefighting, as the fire risk continues to rise:

- 800 hectares (2,000 acres) burned in La Vacarizuela at the beginning of the 1990s, as did roughly 1,000 hectares (2,500 acres) at Torre del Vinagre in 1986.
- In 2001, by the Puerto de las Palomas, some 800 hectares (2,000 acres) were burned intentionally, but as of 2009 there has been no systematic replanting.
- In summer 2005, in the Sierra de las Villas and the west side of the Tranco, over 5,000 hectares (12,000 acres) burned after an electrical storm en the middle of a record heat wave; right in the heart of the park, this was the most massive and devastating disaster in the park's history.

A particular hazard is over-exploitation for tourism, especially at well-known locations such as the village of Arroyo Frío, where tourism has vastly increased with no changes to the infrastructure. The sewage treatment plant at Arroyo Frío intended for about 400 people is saturated every weekend, when ten times that number of visitors arrive, and inadequately treated fecal matter makes its way into the Guadalquivir, to the detriment of fauna and flora.

There have been epidemics, such as the scabies that decimated the population of Spanish ibex in the 1990s, or the local Austropotamobius pallipes crayfish that became virtually extinct due to a fungus that spread after the introduction of North American crayfish. Equally, plant species have suffered epidemics that have damaged the health of extensive forest areas, such as the pine processionary (Thaumetopoea pityocampa), a moth that does major damage to conifers.

Other lesser problems are illegal hunting and logging, animals killed on the highways that pass through the park, and reduction and fragmentation of habitats.

Climate change from global warming has already caused irregularities in the level of precipitation in Cazorla, which endangers the native plants and, by extension, the ecosystem.
