= Las Casillas =

- Village
- Location in Spain Las Casillas (Spain)
- Coordinates: 37°38′21″N 4°00′05″W
- Country: Spain
- Autonomous community: Andalusia
- Province: Jaén
- Municipality: Martos
- Elevation: 569 m (1,867 ft)
- Time zone: UTC+1 (CET)
  - Summer (DST): UTC+2 (CEST)
- Postal code: 23614

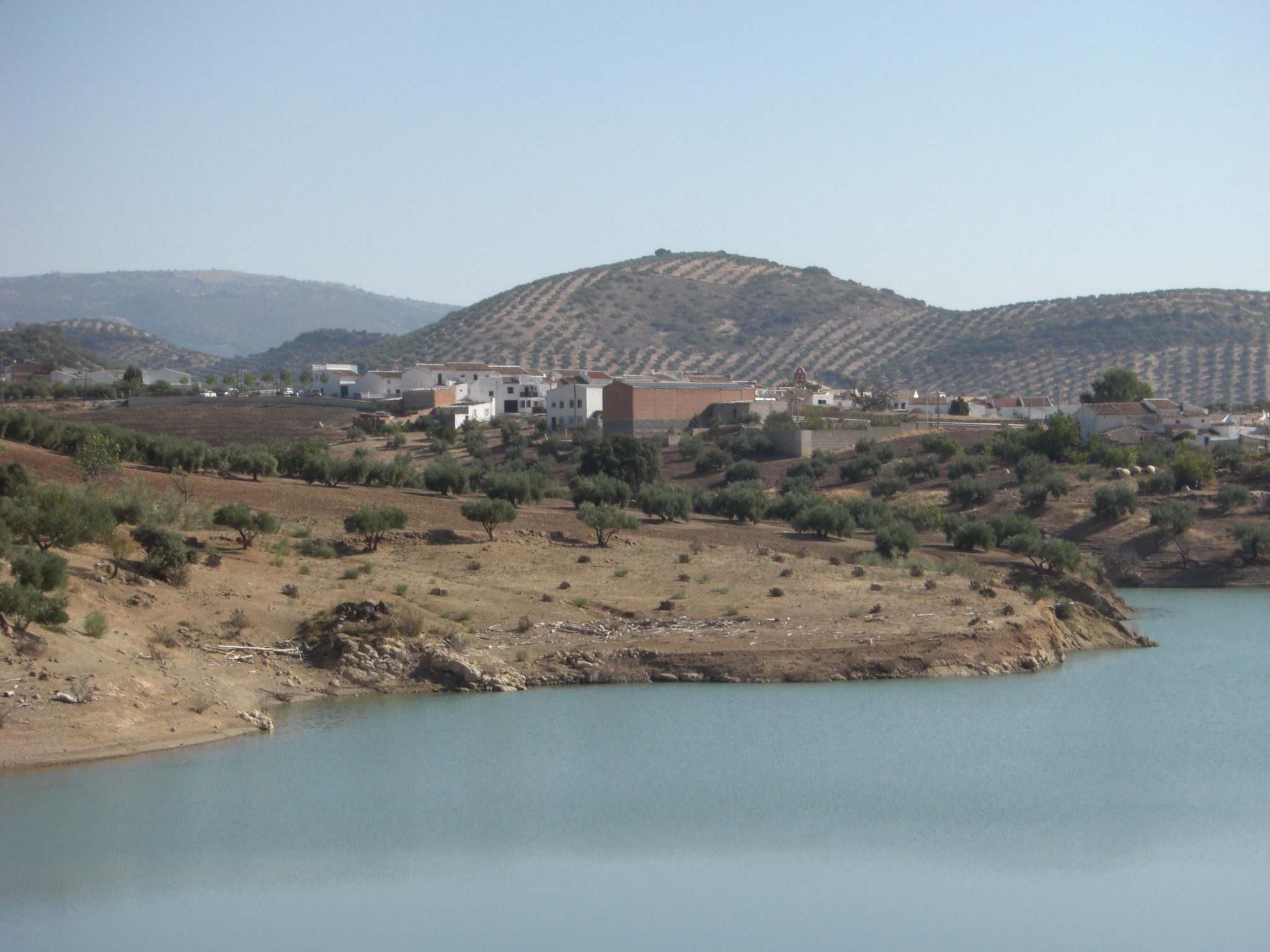
View of Las Casillas next to the Víboras reservoir

Las Casillas is a village in Martos municipality, Province of Jaén, Spain. It is located between the rivers Salado and Víboras and located by the Víboras Reservoir. It is located in front of the Sierra de la Caracolera.
