= Santa Cruz de Tenerife metropolitan area =

Santa Cruz de Tenerife metropolitan area Área metropolitana de Santa Cruz de Tenerife
- Urban area
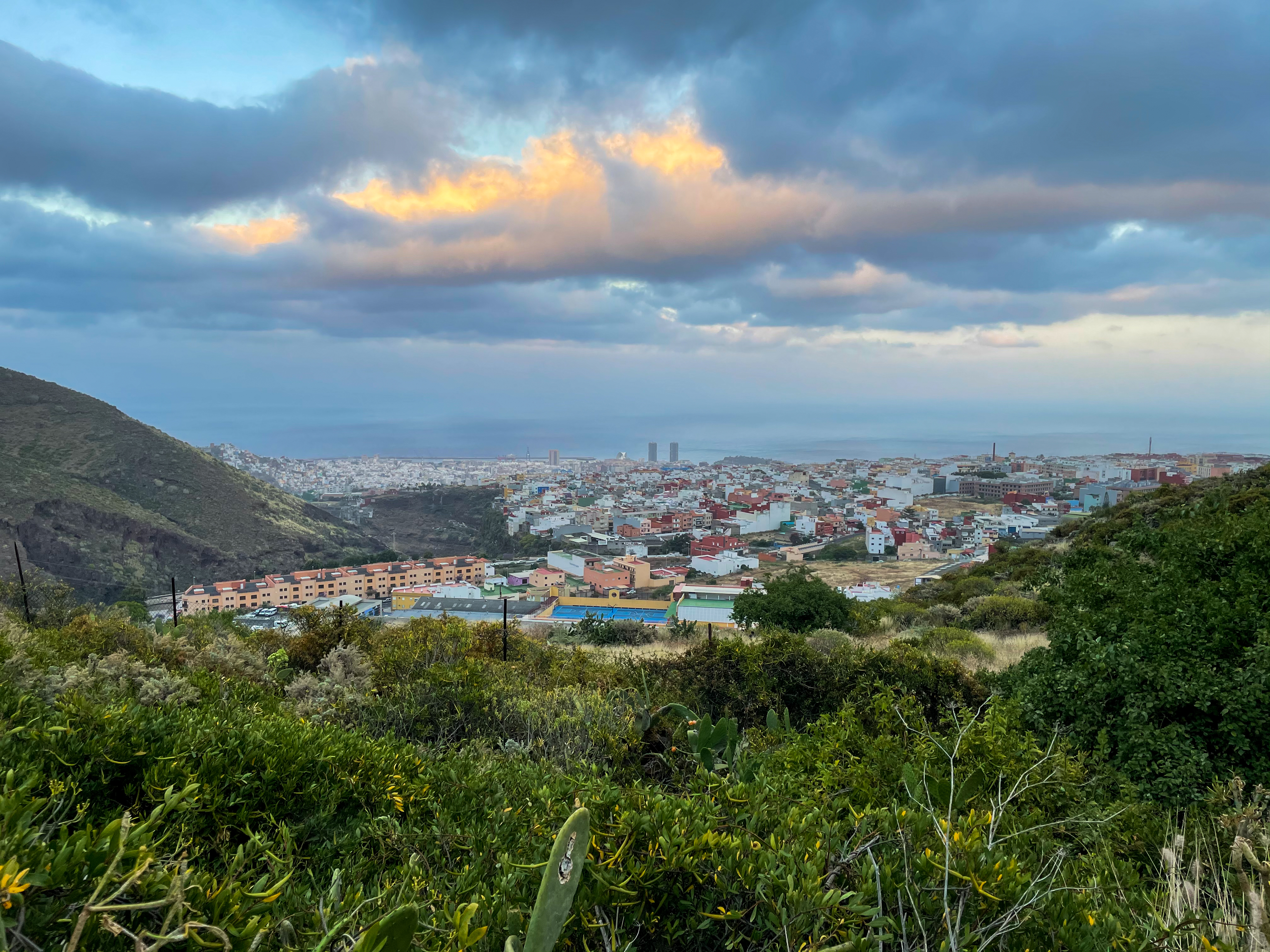
- Skyline of Santa Cruz de Tenerife

- Municipalities in Tenerife island
- Country: Spain
- Largest city: Santa Cruz de Tenerife

Area
  - Metro: 740 km^{2} (290 sq mi)

Population
  - Metro: 581,947
  - Metro density: 787/km^{2} (2,040/sq mi)

GDP
  - Metro: €17.138 billion

The Santa Cruz de Tenerife metropolitan area (known in Spanish as: Área metropolitana de Santa Cruz de Tenerife) is the metropolitan area of Santa Cruz de Tenerife. The metropolitan area is located in the island of Tenerife, with an area of 1,748 km^{2}

== Economy ==
In 2020 Santa Cruz de Tenerife gross metropolitan product was €17.138 billion. This puts Santa Cruz de Tenerife in 136th place among cities in European Union.

== See also ==
- List of metropolitan areas in Spain
