= Palma de Mallorca metropolitan area =

Palma de Mallorca metropolitan area Área metropolitana de Palma de Mallorca
- Urban area
- Skyline of Palma
- Country: Spain
- Largest city: Palma

Area
  - Metro: 979 km^{2} (378 sq mi)

Population
  - Metro: 556,782
  - Metro density: 249/km^{2} (640/sq mi)

GDP
  - Metro: €21.456 billion

The Palma de Mallorca metropolitan area (Catalan: Àrea metropolitana de Palma, Spanish: Área metropolitana de Palma de Mallorca) is the metropolitan area of Palma (officially Palma de Mallorca). The metropolitan area is located in the Mallorca island with an area of 979 km^{2}

== Economy ==
In 2020 Palma de Mallorca gross metropolitan product was €21.456 billion. This puts Palma de Mallorca in 108th place among cities in European Union.

== See also ==
- List of metropolitan areas in Spain
