= Jaén metropolitan area =

Jaén metropolitan area Área Metropolitana de Jaén
- Urban area
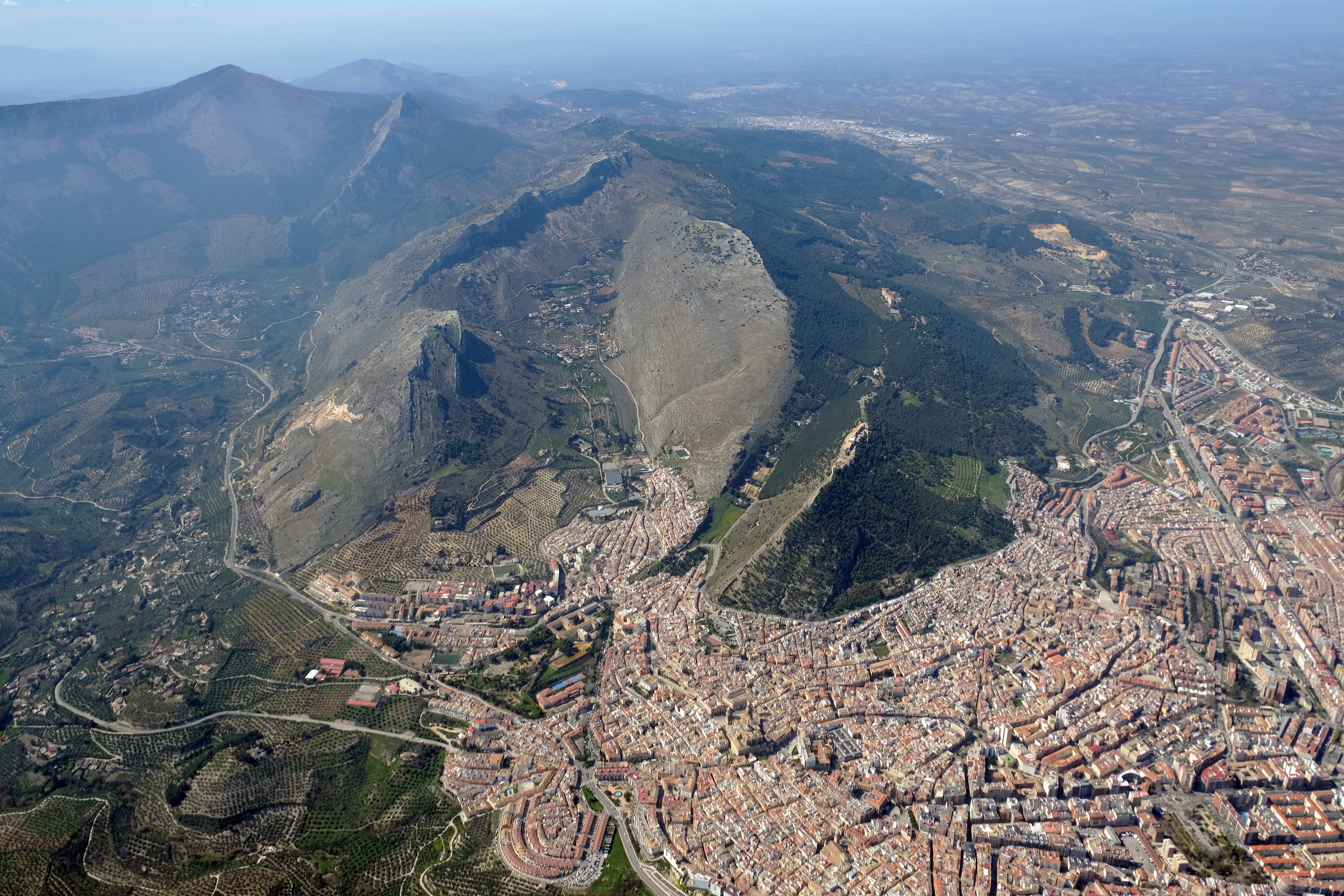
- Aerial view of Jaén

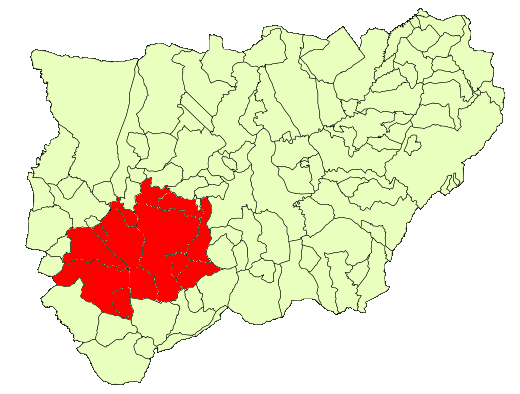
- Jaén metropolitan area (in red) in Jaén Province
- Coordinates: 37°47′16.879″N 3°51′55.908″W
- Country: Spain
- Region: Andalusia
- Largest city: Jaén

Area
  - Metro: 1,498.69 km^{2} (578.65 sq mi)

Population (1 January 2023)
  - Metro: 215,434
  - Metro density: 148.69/km^{2} (385.1/sq mi)
- Time zone: CET

The Jaén metropolitan area is an urban area in Andalusia (Spain) centered on the city of Jaén. With a population of over 215,000 people, it ranks last in the metropolitan areas of Andalusia, but is the largest urban area in the Province of Jaén, Spain.

The area consists of 15 municipalities. It was defined by the Plan de Ordenación del Territorio de Andalucía in 2006. It mostly coincides with the Metropolitan Comarca of Jaén, except for some municipalities.

Despite its small size for Andalusian and Spanish standards, it is the most important area in the province. It holds over 34% of the province's population in just 11% of the area. As with the rest of the province, it has experienced a population decline since the early 2010s, but it has not been as severe as in other areas of the province.

Besides Jaén, relevant cities are Martos, Mancha Real and Mengíbar, whose industries represent an important part of the province's GDP.

== Municipalities ==
	Municipality	Comarca	Population (INE 2015)	Population (INE 2023)	Area (km²)	Density (per sq km²) (2023)
Jaén	Jaén	Metropolitana	115.395	111.888	424,30	263.42
Martos	Martos	Metropolitana	24.398	24.363	259,10	94.05
Torredelcampo	Torredelcampo	Metropolitana	14.605	13.871	182	76.21
Torredonjimeno	Torredonjimeno	Metropolitana	14.011	13.297	157,6	84.37
Mancha Real	Mancha Real	Metropolitana	11.212	11.376	97	117.28
Mengíbar	Mengíbar	Metropolitana	9.935	10.045	62	162.39
Los Villares	Los Villares	Metropolitana	5.999	6.084	88	69.14
La Guardia de Jaén	La Guardia de Jaén	Metropolitana	4.832	5.189	38,43	135.02
Villatorres	Villatorres	Metropolitana	4.412	4.289	72,71	58.99
Los Villares	Valdepeñas de Jaén	Sierra Sur	3.926	3.570	183,80	19.42
Jamilena	Jamilena	Metropolitana	3.404	3.322	8,96	370.76
Fuensanta de Martos	Fuensanta de Martos	Metropolitana	3.160	3.026	53,32	337.72
Pegalajar	Pegalajar	Sierra Mágina	3.032	2.828	79,7	38.04
Fuerte del Rey	Fuerte del Rey	Metropolitana	1.409	1.354	34,43	39.33
Villardompardo	Villardompardo	Metropolitana	1.029	919	17	54.06
	Total		222,844	215,434	1,498.69 km²	143.68

== See also ==
- Jaén, Spain
- List of metropolitan areas in Spain
