= List of metropolitan areas in Spain =

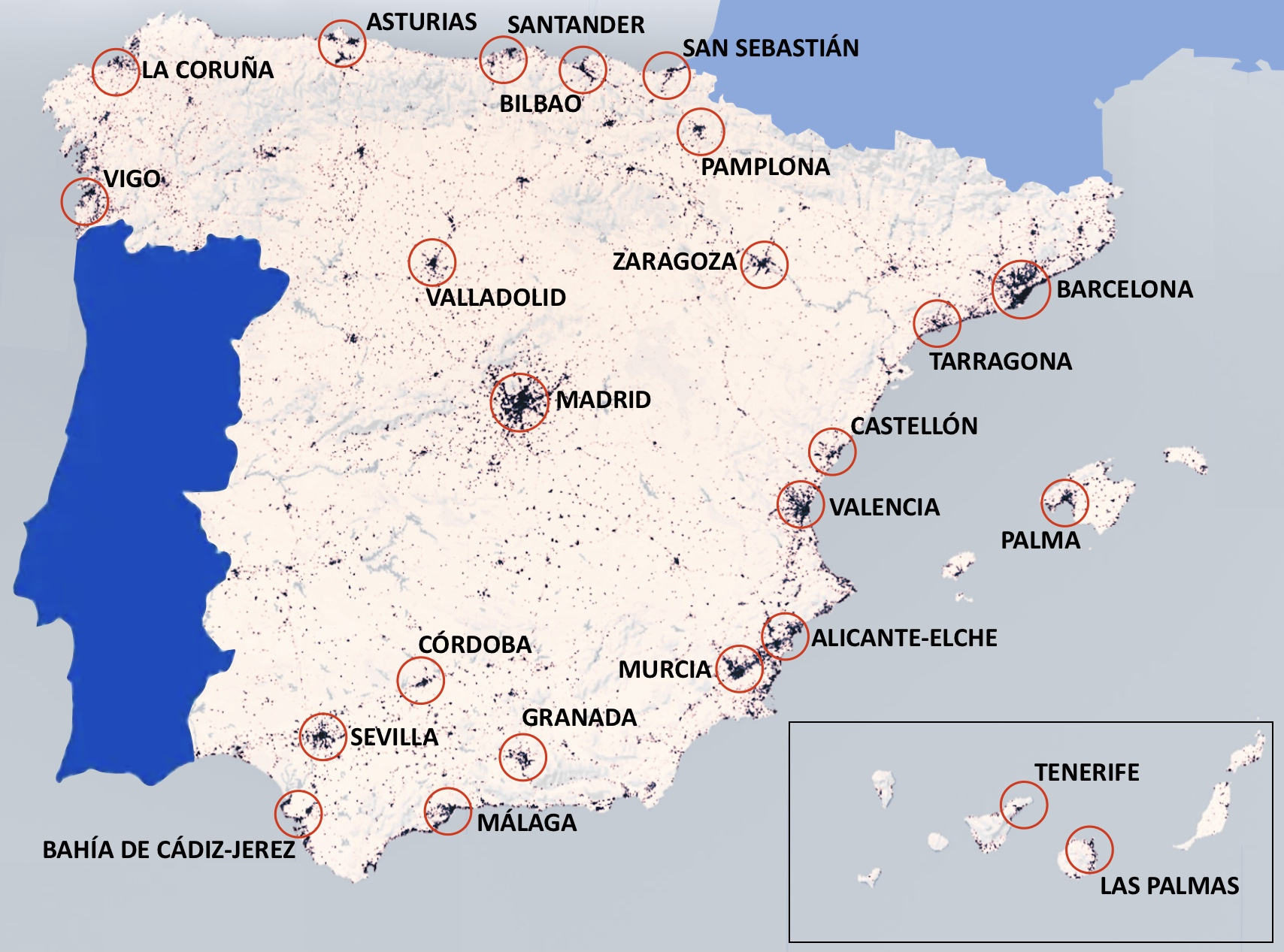
Infographic based on Corinne Land Cover 2018. IGN.

This is a list of the largest metropolitan areas in Spain by population.

Estimates are from the following sources:

- the "Functional Urban Areas" (FUAs) of the Study on Urban Functions of the European Spatial Planning Observation Network (ESPON, 2007)
- the "Larger Urban Zone" (LUZs) of Urban Audit project (2004), supported by the European Union. Not all cities were included in this survey.
- calculations by Francisco Ruiz from data of the Instituto Nacional de Estadística (2008 estimates). As well as "metropolitan area" data, Ruiz has produced larger conurbation data for some areas. The "conurbation" figure is used where available, and is cited as such; otherwise, the "metropolitan area" figure is used.

The figures differ between the reports due to the difference in survey dates and differences in methodology. For example, ESPON considers Oviedo–Gijón–Avilés as a single FUA, while Urban Audit has separate LUZs for Oviedo and Gijón. Similarly, Vilanova i la Geltrú is included in Barcelona metropolitan area by ESPON, but as a separate conurbation by Ruiz.

== List ==
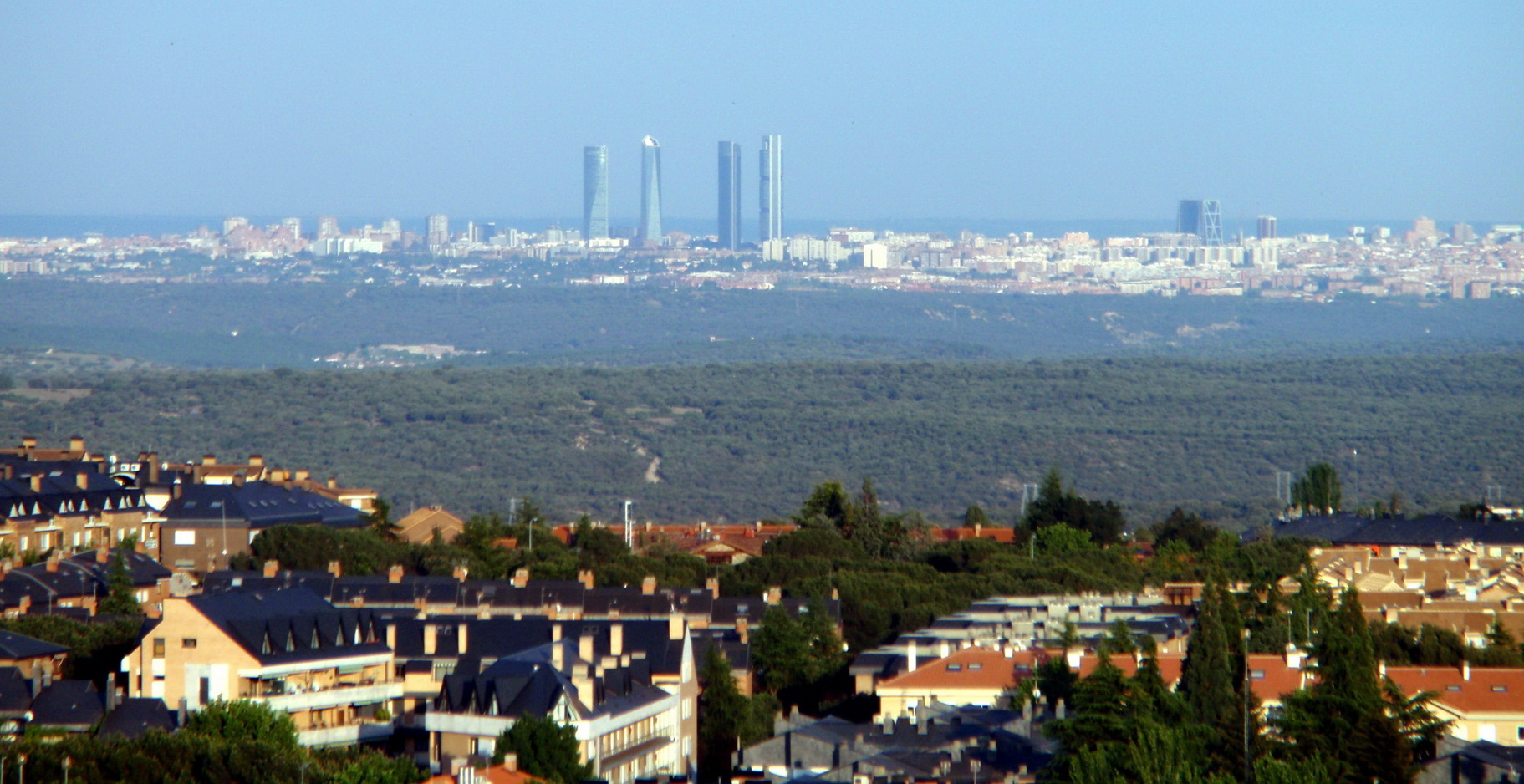
1. Madrid

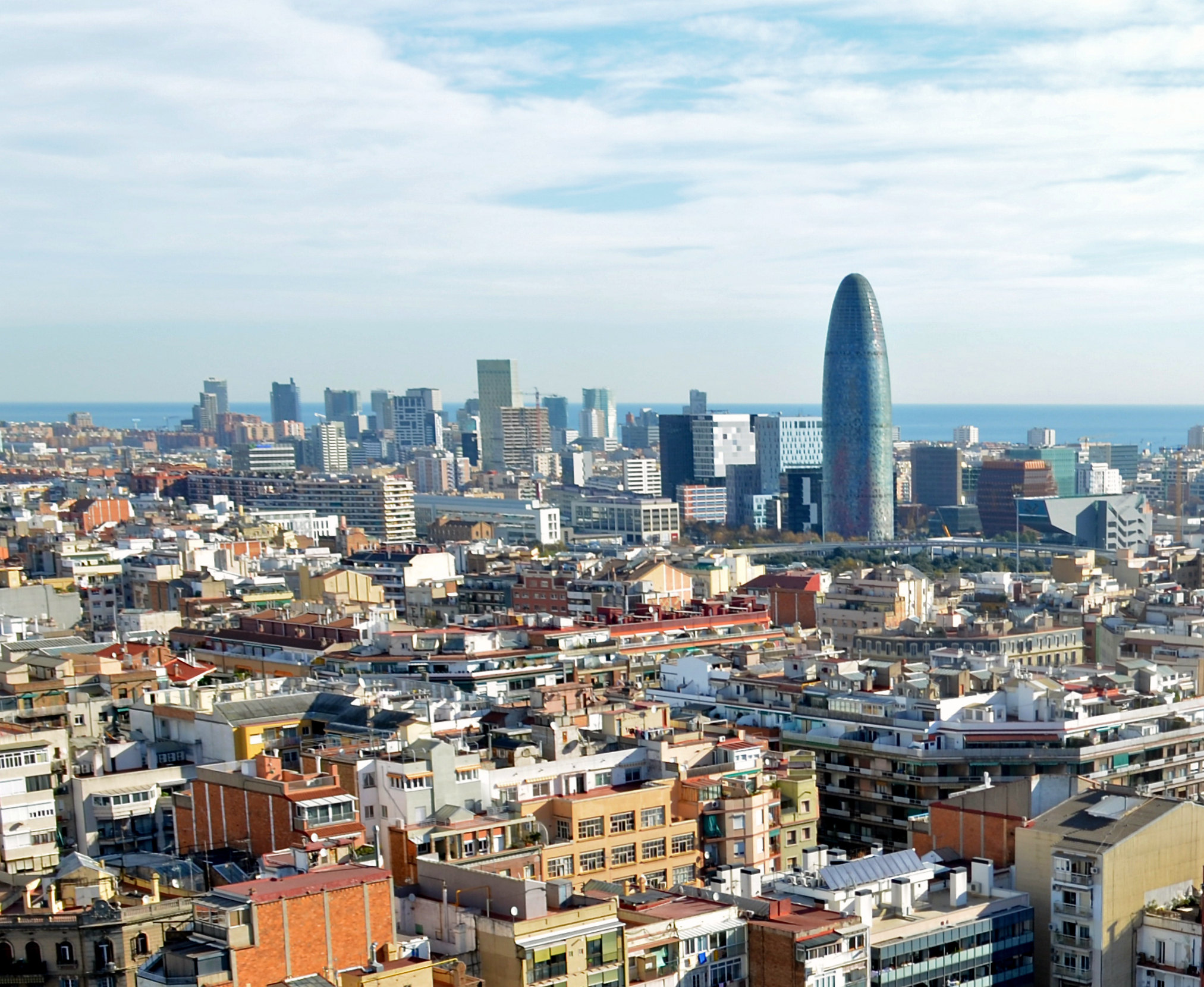
2. Barcelona

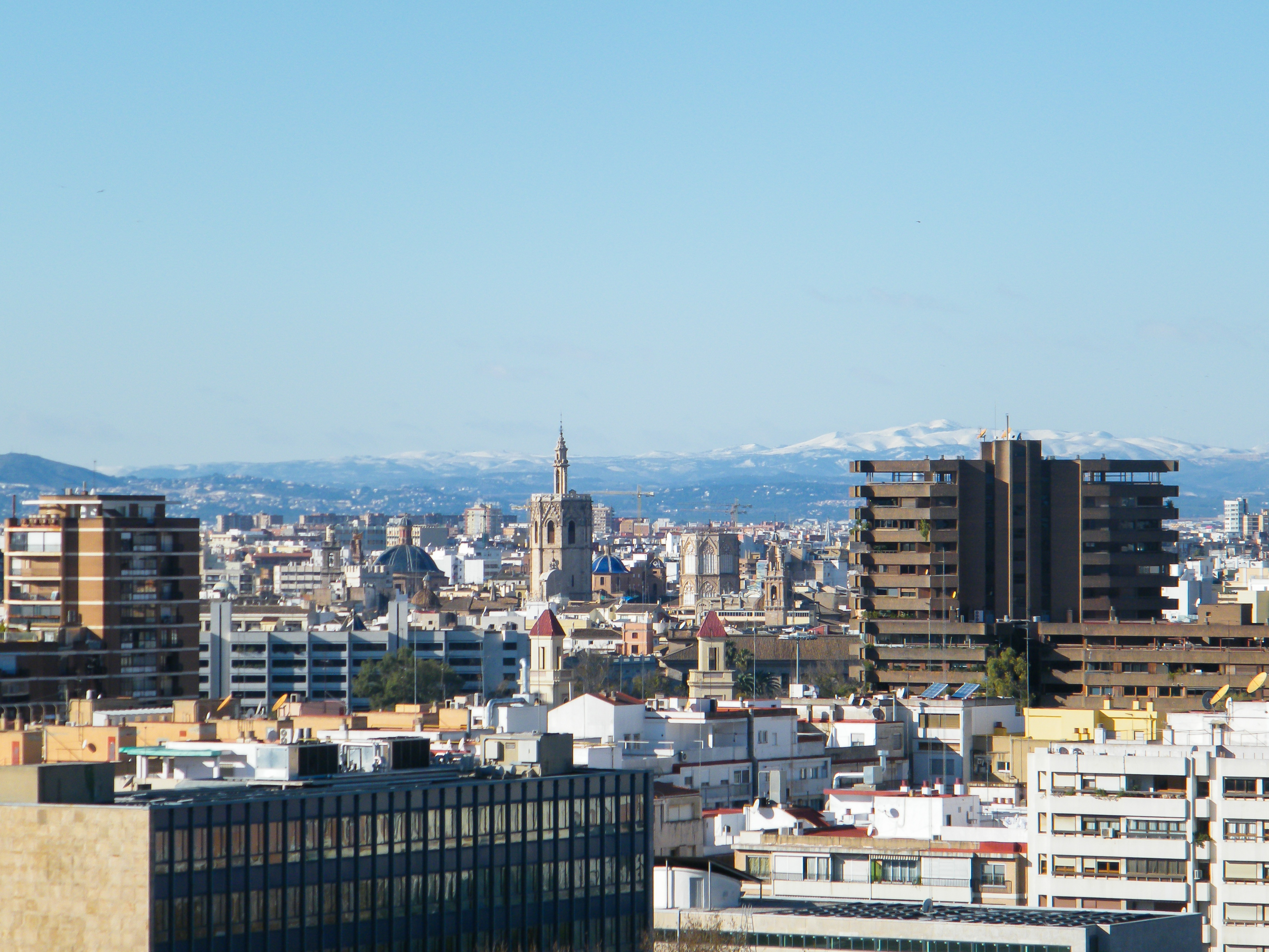
3. Valencia

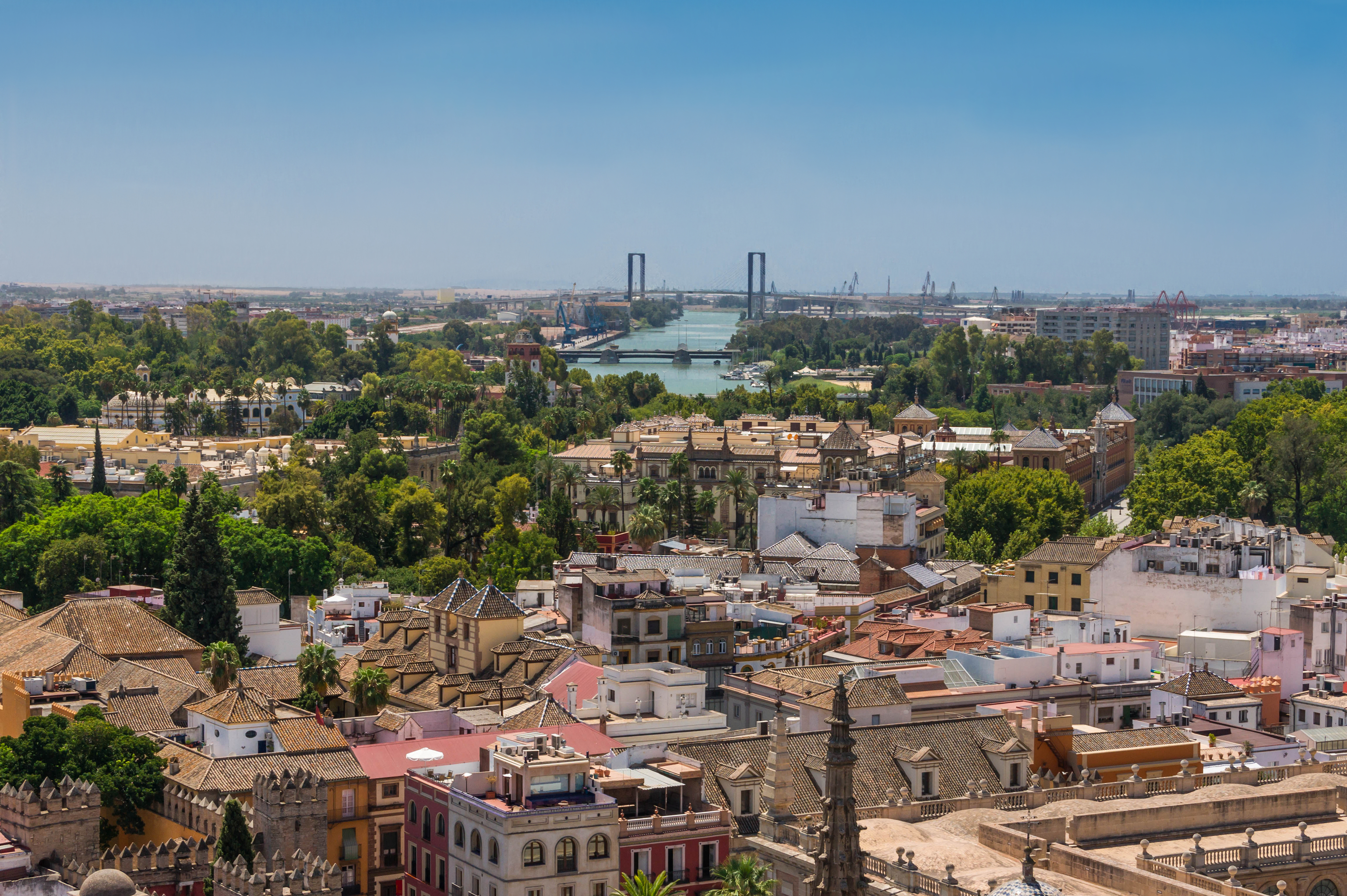
4. Seville

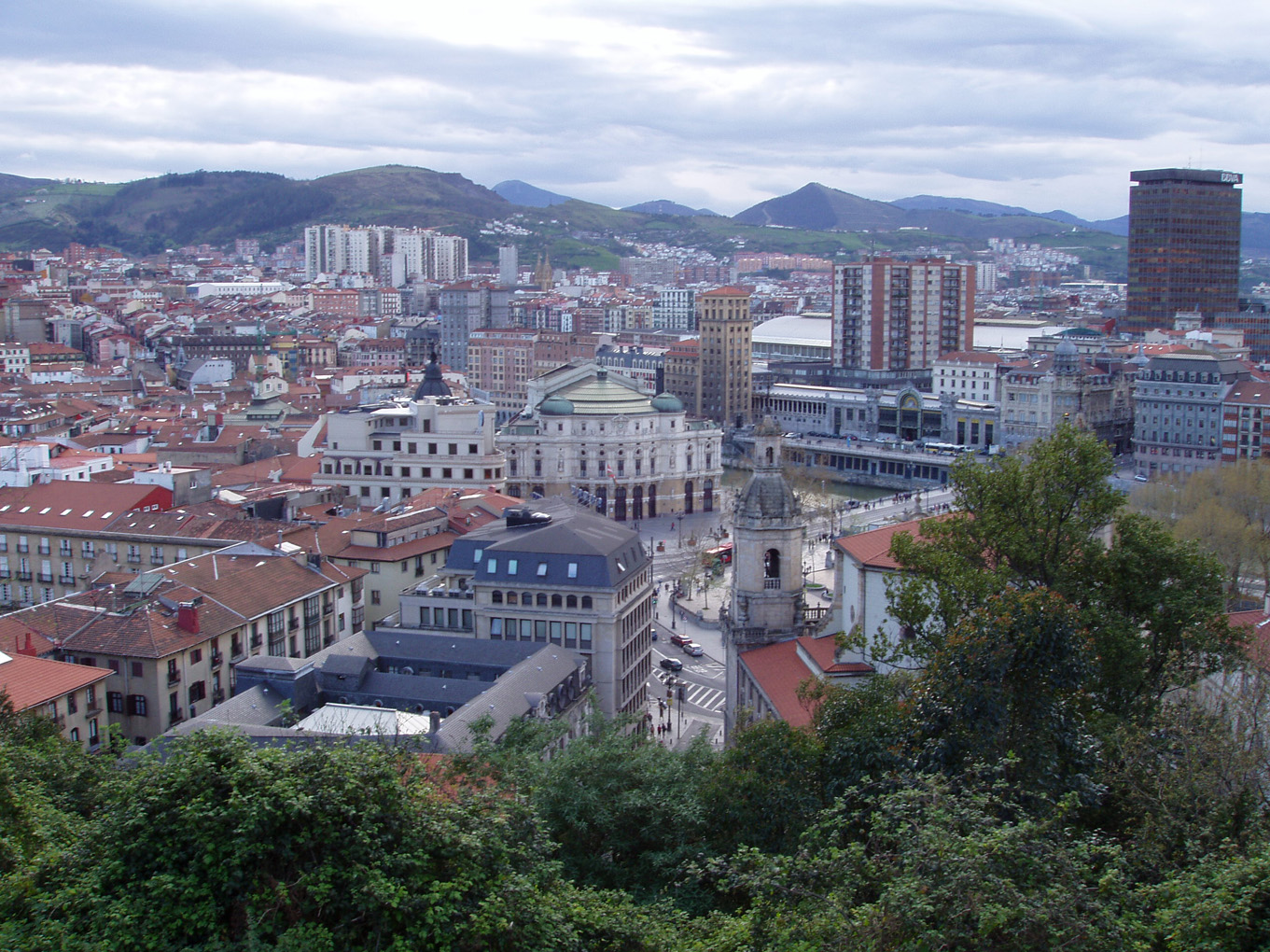
5. Bilbao

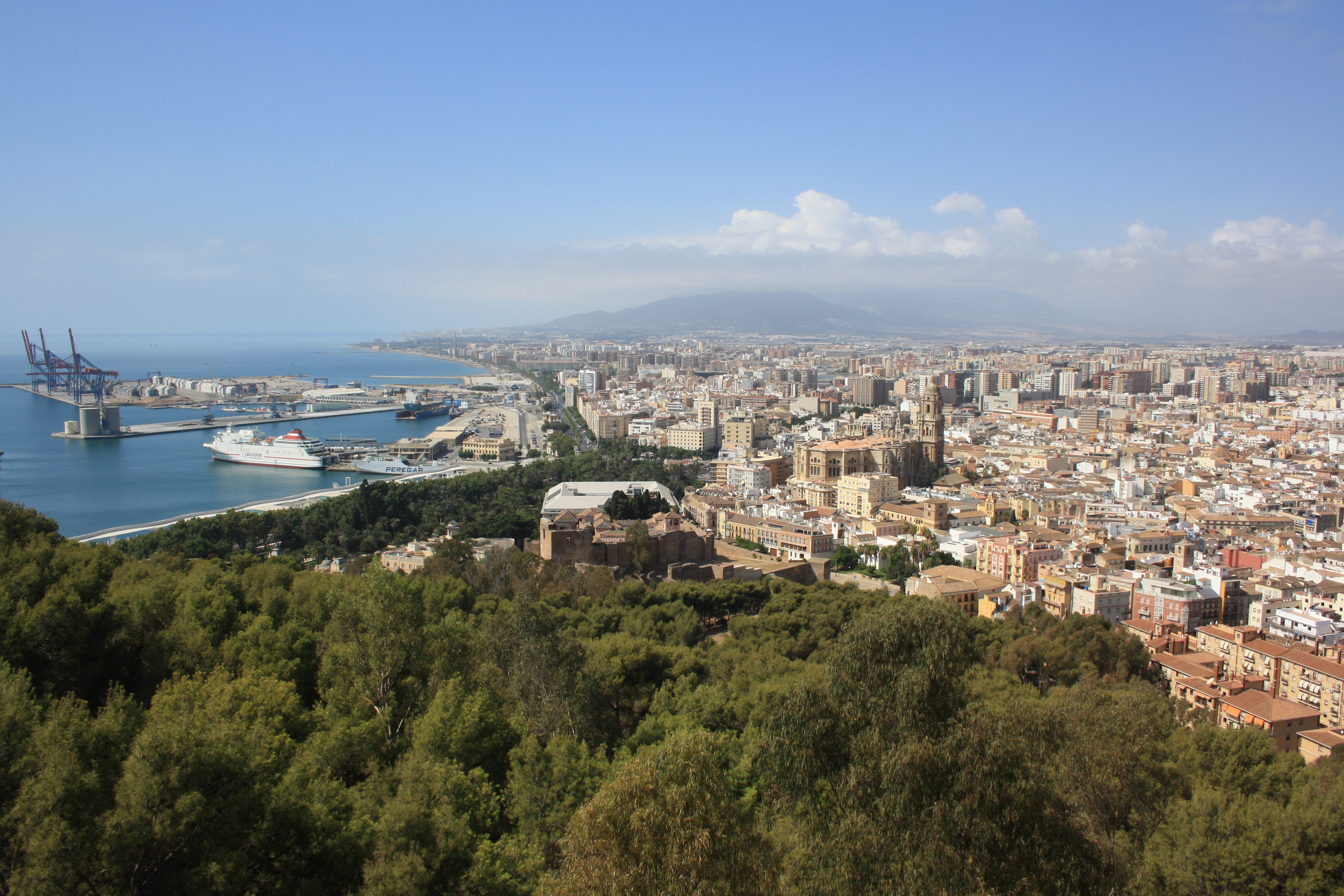
6. Málaga

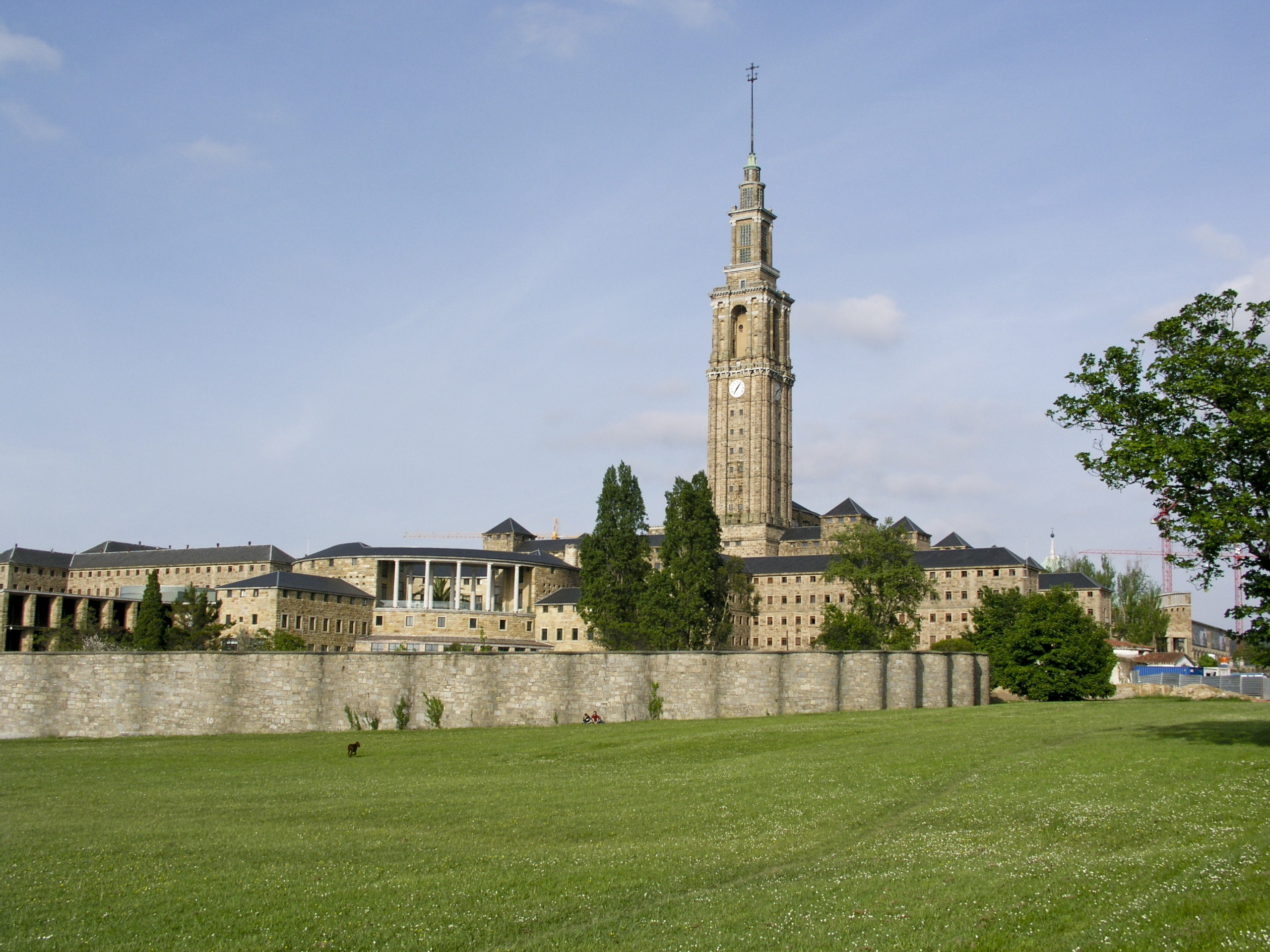
7. Gijón–Oviedo–Avilés

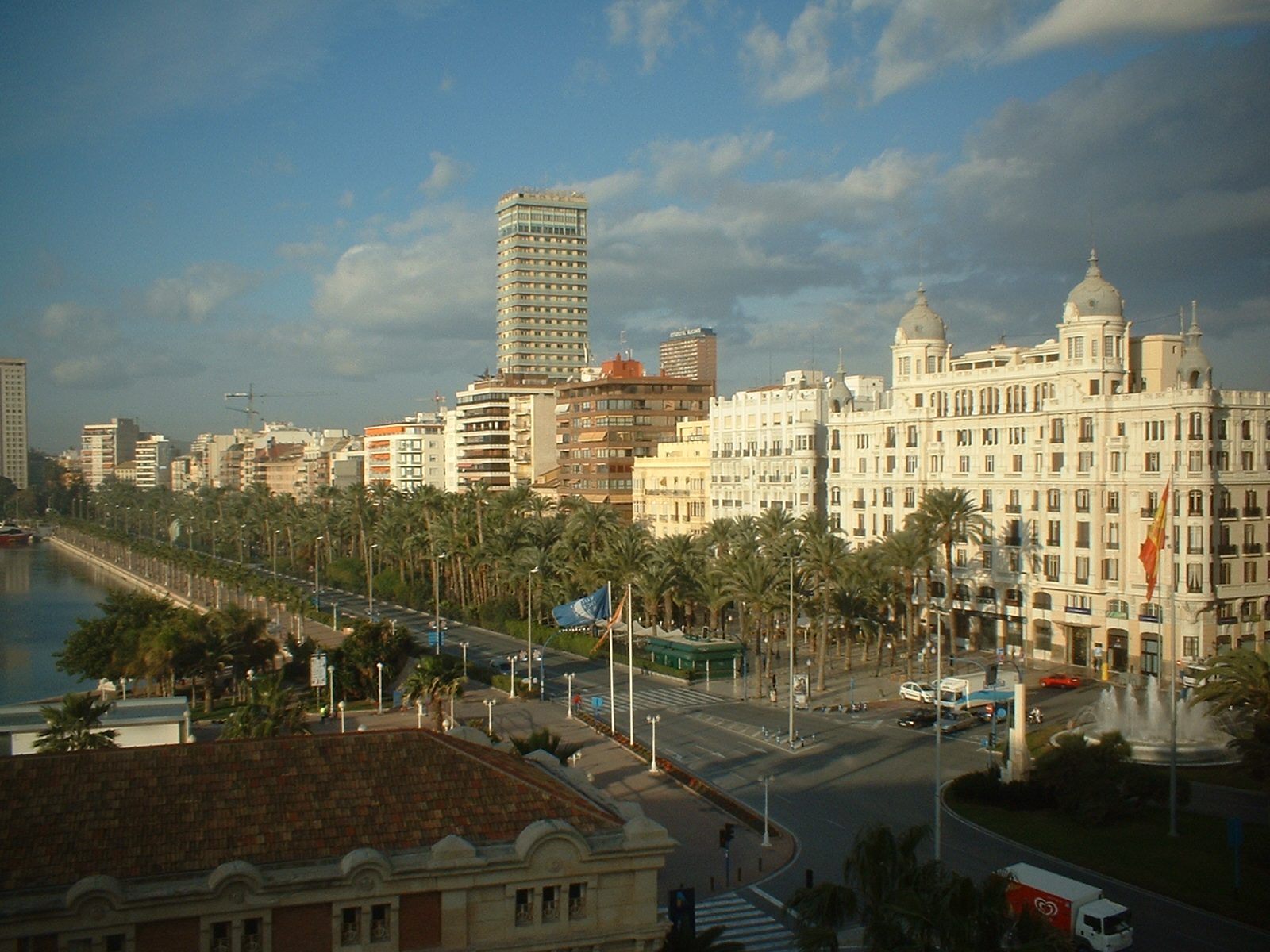
8. Alicante–Elche

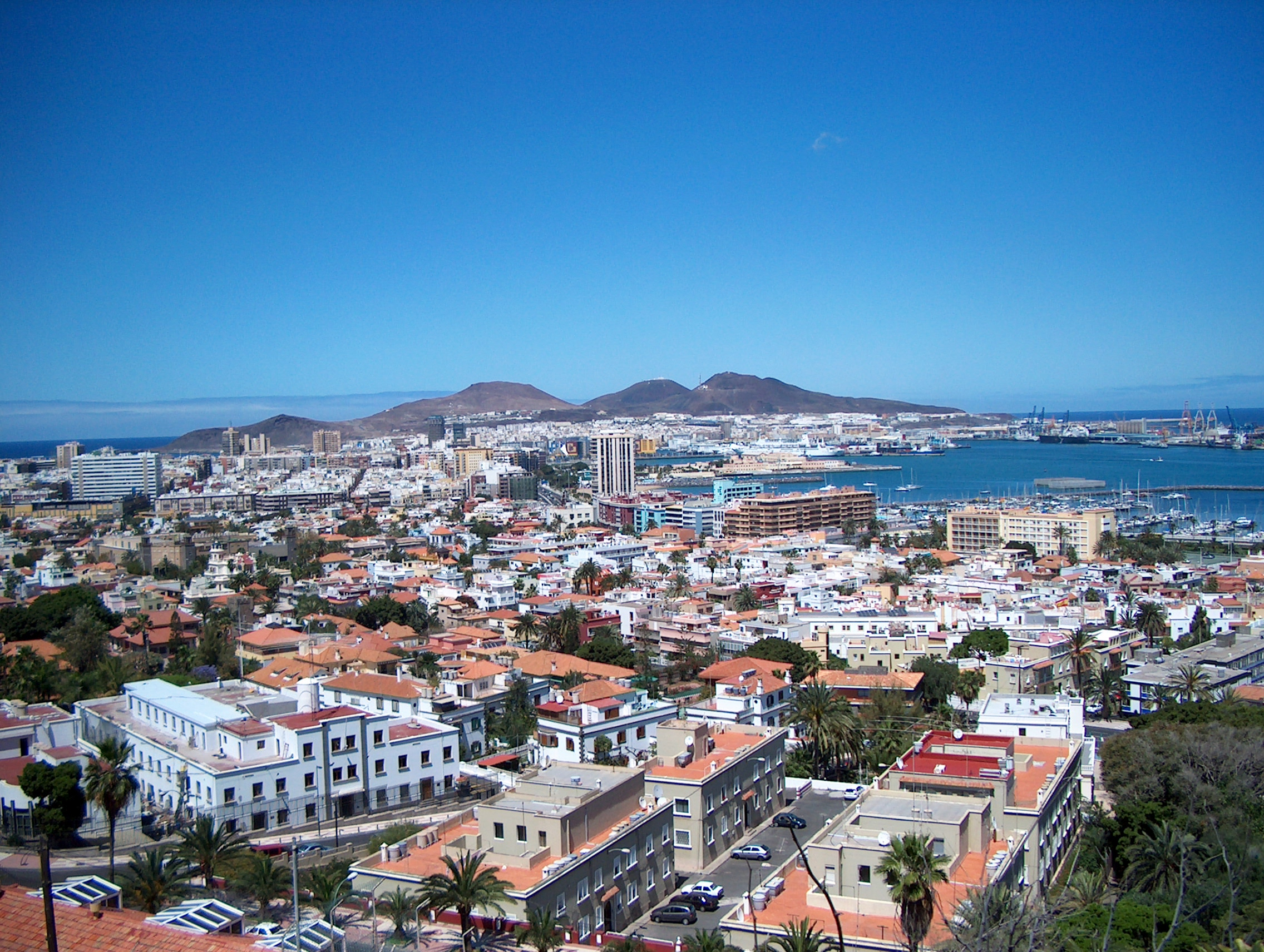
9. Las Palmas

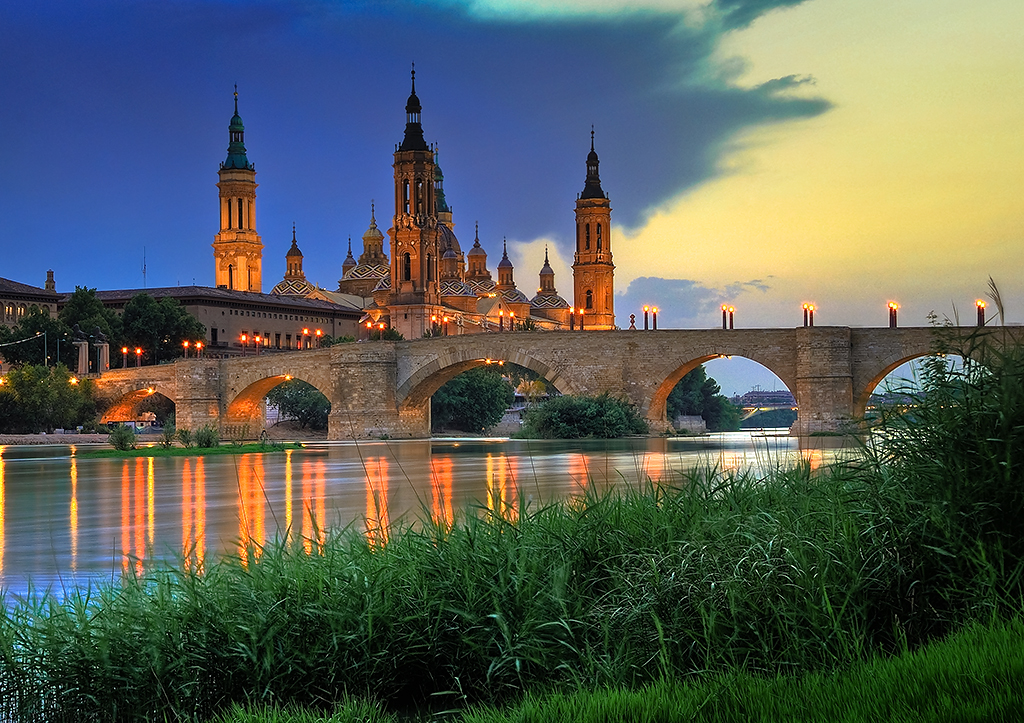
10. Zaragoza

Metropolitan area (2018)	ESPON	Urban Audit	Ruiz
Madrid	6,155,116	6,204,829	7,038,056
Barcelona	5,179,243	5,233,638	5,142,490
Valencia	1,645,342	1,564,145	2,300,000
Seville	1,305,342	1,249,346	1,360,361
Bilbao	987,000	989,994	953,152
Málaga	944,000	1,218,245	923,104
Asturias (Gijón-Oviedo)	844,000	617,300 (295,640 + 321,660)	863,050
Alicante	793,000	429,060	785,020
Las Palmas	640,000	625,892	741,826
Zaragoza	639,000	685,873	715,894
Murcia	623,000	479,313	763,723
Santa Cruz de Tenerife	581,947	481,592	481,592
Granada	440,000	—	498,365
Palma	433,000	593,386	509,116
Vigo	413,000	548,799	666,292
Cartagena	409,000	—	316,398 (229,733 + 55,170 + 31,495)
Cádiz	400,000	—	425,462
San Sebastián	393,000	—	404,921
A Coruña	376,000	—	408,068
Valladolid	369,000	430,576	395,984
Tarragona(–Reus)	325,000	—	423,360
Córdoba	314,000	779,870	325,453
Pamplona	286,000	355,577	328,511
Castellón de la Plana	259,000	—	386,906
Bay of Santander	249,000	290,785	391,293
Alzira–Xàtiva	241,000	—	348,582
Vitoria-Gasteiz	226,000	252,384	242,837
Algeciras–La Línea	206,000	—	230,203
Huelva	193,000	—	215,530
Almería	192,000	—	218,236
Salamanca	192,000	—	205,489
Jerez de la Frontera	189,000	—	209,690
León	187,000	—	201,987
Albacete	185,000	—	173,457
Jaén-Martos	180,000	—	191,652
Burgos	176,000	—	192,692
Logroño	156,000	171,599	186,985
Ferrol–Narón	155,000	—	156,111
Lleida	147,000	363,900	176,543
Girona–Salt	144,000	—	180,426
Pontevedra–Marín	142,000	—	149,255
Badajoz	141,000	663,896	151,579
La Orotava–Puerto de la Cruz(–Los Realejos)	140,000	—	151,623
Santiago de Compostela	138,000	186,332	151,690
Ourense	137,000	—	138,600
Benidorm(–La Vila Joiosa)	134,000	—	183,253
Gandia(–Oliva)	132,000	—	169,916
Blanes(–Pineda de Mar–Lloret de Mar)	131,000	—	182,673
Manresa	122,000	—	145,215
Marbella	116,000	—	138,447
Torrelavega	116,000	—	129,509
Vic–Manlleu	111,000	—	129,994
Guadalajara	104,000	—	144,687
Lugo	99,000	—	106,066
Palencia	99,000	—	103,511
Toledo	95,000	167,036	119,368

== See also ==
- Demographics of Spain
- List of cities (municipalities) of Spain
- List of metropolitan areas in Europe
- List of urban areas of the European Union
