= Granada metropolitan area =

Granada metropolitan area Área Metropolitana de Granada
- Urban area
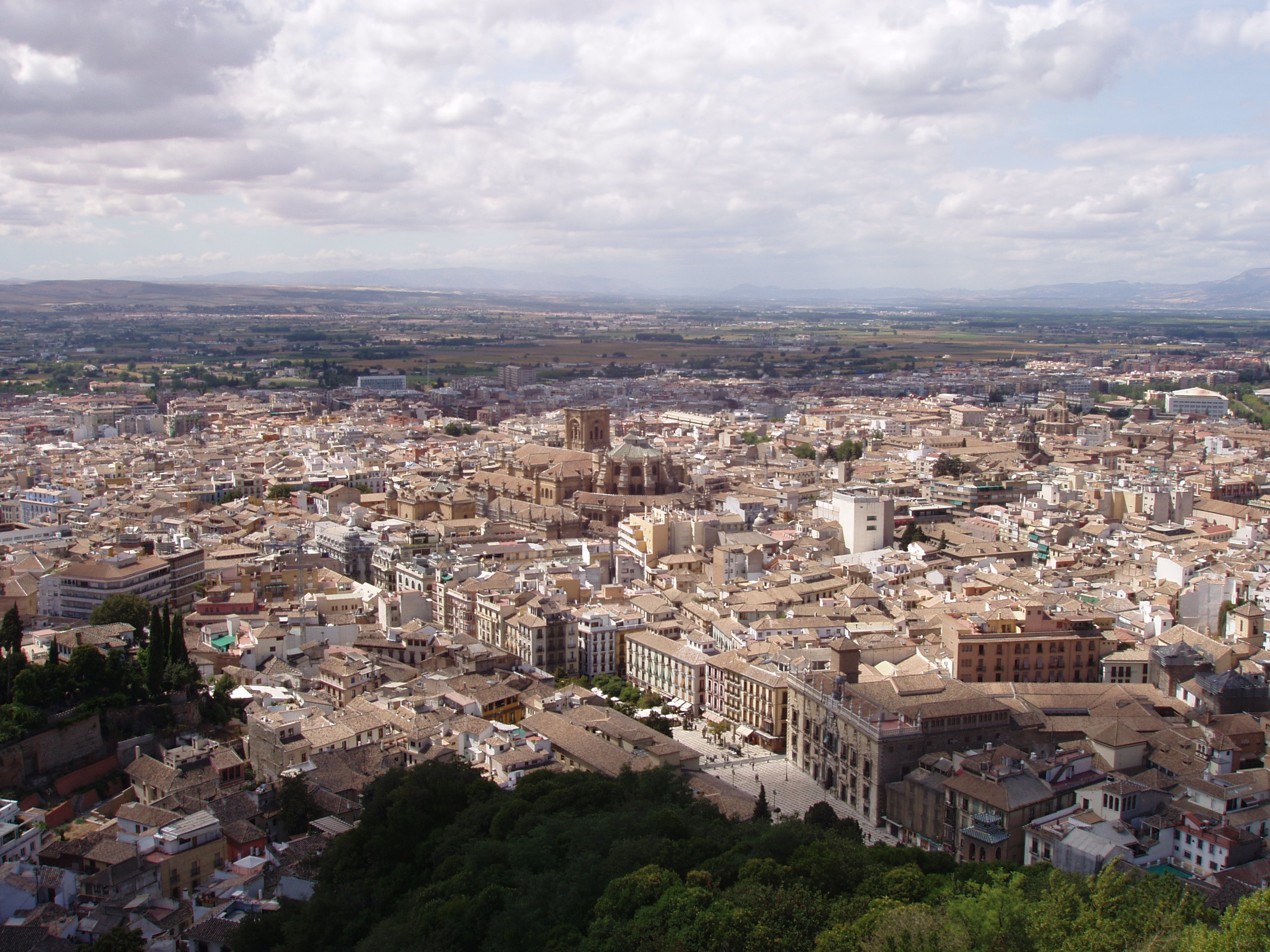
- Skyline of Granada

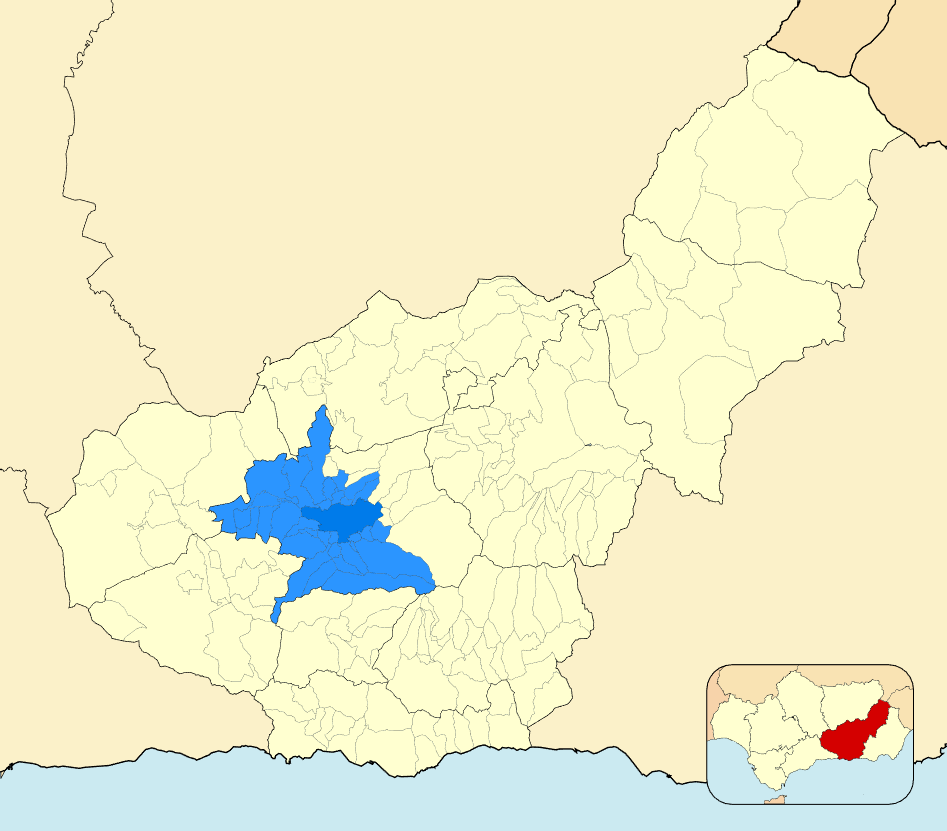
- Granada metropolitan area (in blue) in Granada Province
- Country: Spain
- Largest city: Granada

Area
  - Metro: 973 km^{2} (376 sq mi)

Population
  - Metro: 543,816
  - Metro density: 559/km^{2} (1,450/sq mi)

GDP
  - Metro: €15.839 billion

The Granada metropolitan area (known in Spanish as: Área Metropolitana de Granada) is the metropolitan area of Granada. The metropolitan area is located in the Province of Granada, with an area of 973 km^{2}.

== Economy ==
In 2020 Granda gross metropolitan product was €15.839 billion. This puts A Granada in 146th place among cities in European Union.

== See also ==
- List of metropolitan areas in Spain
