= La Guardia de Jaén =

- Municipality
- Guardia de Jaén (La)
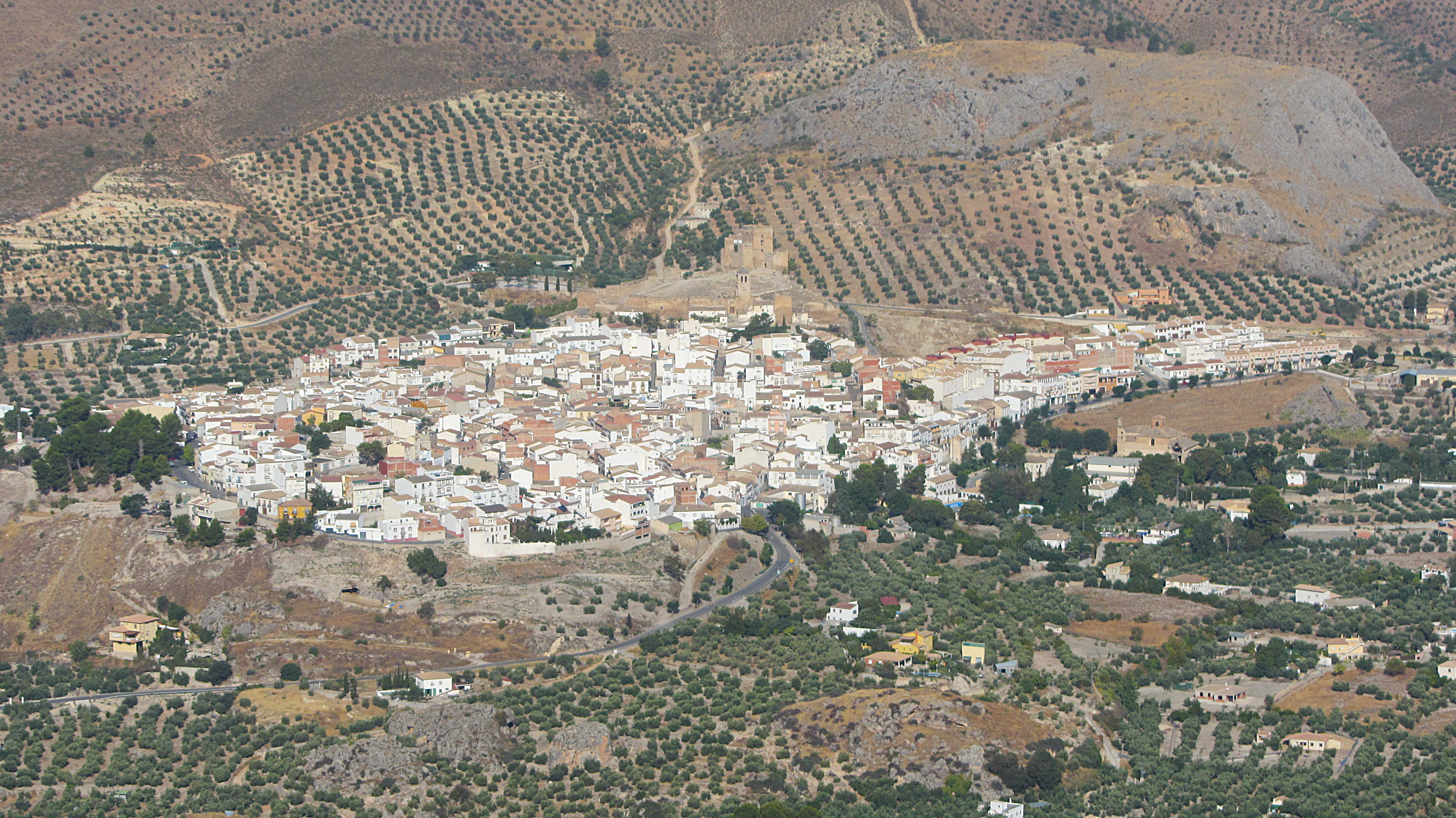
- Panoramic of La Guardia de Jaén and her castle.

- Flag Coat of arms

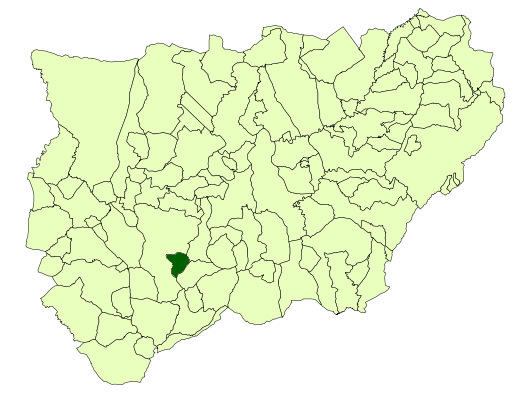
- Location of La Guardia de Jaén in relation to province of Jaén

- Location in the Province of Jaén La Guardia de Jaén (Andalusia) La Guardia de Jaén (Spain)
- Coordinates: 37°44′31″N 3°41′33″W
- Country: Spain
- Autonomous community: Andalusia
- Province: Jaén
- Comarca: Jaén metropolitan area
- Judicial district: Jaén
- Founded: Near 1500 BC (Mentesa Bastia)

Government
  - Alcalde: Juan Morillo García (2007) (PP)

Area
  - Total: 38.43 km^{2} (14.84 sq mi)
- Elevation: 635 m (2,083 ft)

Population (2009)
  - Total: 4,061
  - Density: 105.7/km^{2} (273.7/sq mi)
- Demonym: Guardeño
- Time zone: UTC+1 (CET)
  - Summer (DST): UTC+2 (CEST)
- Postal code: 23170
- Dialing code: (+34) 953 3X XX XX
- Website: Official website

La Guardia de Jaén or Guardia de Jaén, La (official name), and the old Mentesa Bastia at Iberic and Roman era, is a small city located in the province of Jaén (Spain) at western end of Sierra Mágina, on the Cerro de San Marcos, near the promontory of Cerro de San Cristóbal, from where it dominates the valley of the river Guadalbullón.
With a population of 4061 inhabitants -according to January 2009 census (INE)-, is situated 635 m (2,083.33 ft) over sea level, with an area of 38.43 km^{2} (14.84 sq mi). Located some 10 km (6.2 mi) from Jaén, being the closest town, better communication with the capital thanks to the three tracks that bind: Jontoya highway bridge, road N-323 and Bailén-Motril motorway (A44/E-902).

== See also ==
- Convent of Santo Domingo, La Guardia de Jaén
- List of municipalities in Jaén
