= Martos =

- Municipality
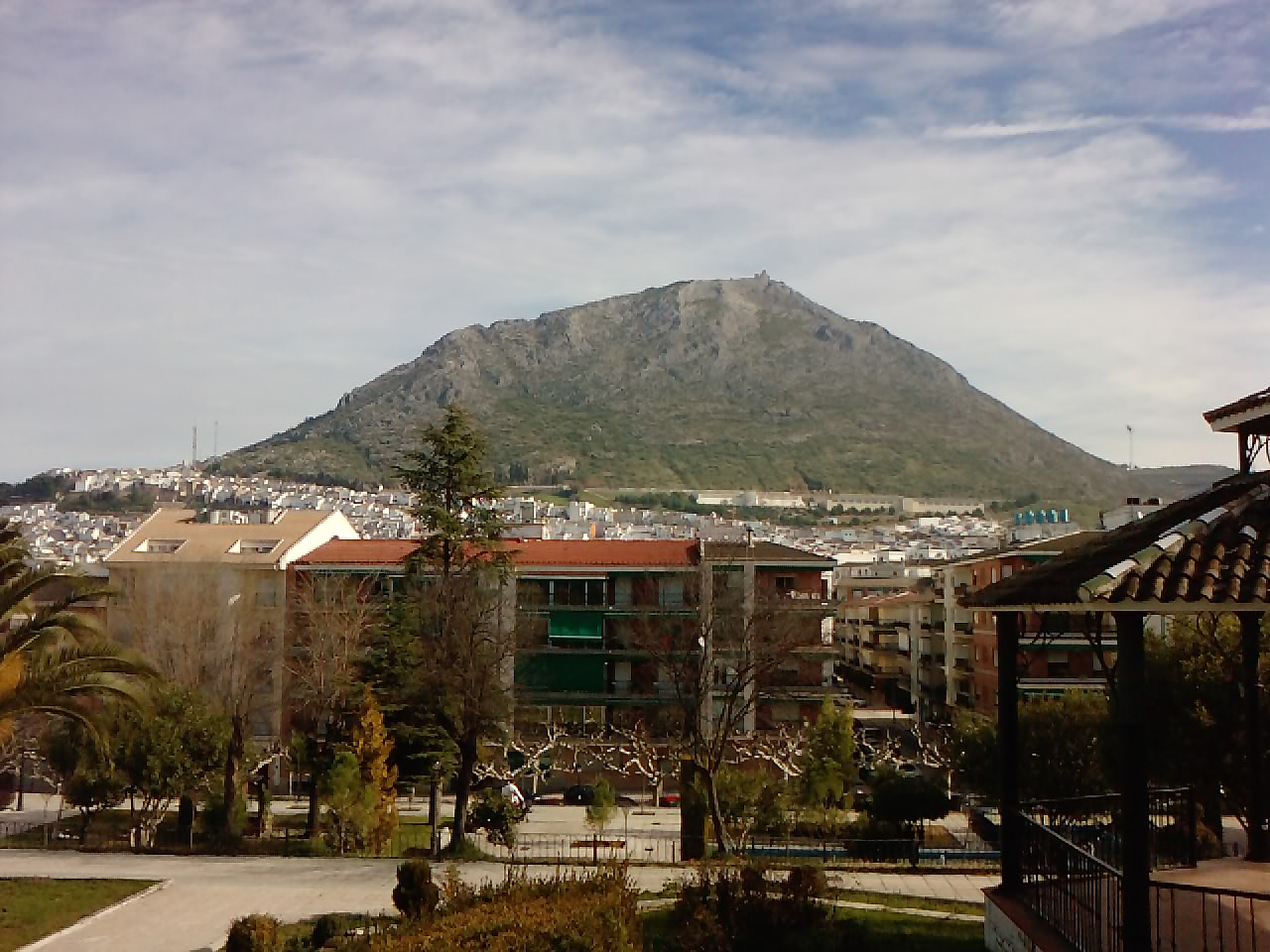
- View of Martos and the rock of Martos

- Flag Coat of arms
- Nicknames: Ciudad de la Peña (Spanish) "City of the Rock"; Cuna del Olivar (Spanish) "Cradle of the Olive Grove"
- Interactive map of Martos
- Coordinates: 37°43′N 3°58′W
- Country: Spain
- Autonomous community: Andalusia
- Province: Jaén

Government
  - Alcalde (2023–2027): Emilio Torres Velasco (Spanish Socialist Workers' Party)

Area
  - Total: 259.10 km^{2} (100.04 sq mi)
- Elevation: 753 m (2,470 ft)

Population (1 January 2023)
  - Total: 24,363
  - Density: 94.029/km^{2} (243.53/sq mi)
- Demonym(s): Marteño/a, tuccitano/a
- Time zone: UTC+1 (CET)
  - Summer (DST): UTC+2 (CEST)
- Postal code: 23600
- Dialing code: (+34) 953 55 XX XX (+34) 953 70 XX XX
- Website: www.martos.es

Martos is a city and municipality of Spain belonging to the province of Jaén in the autonomous community of Andalusia.

With a population of over 24,000 people, Martos is the fifth largest municipality in the province and the second in Jaén metropolitan area. Housing lies at the foot of the 1,003-metre (3,290 ft) Peña de Martos, on the western side of the Sierra Sur de Jaén, a subrange of the Baetic System, in the south of the Iberian Peninsula.

As is essentially the case in the entire province of Jaén, the economy of Martos is heavily based on agriculture, specifically the cultivation of the olive tree. With over 22,000 hectares of olive fields (accounting for 85% of the municipality area) and 20 million liters per year, Martos is the largest olive oil producing city in the world, thus earning the nickname of 'Cradle of the Olive Grove'.

Martos is also an important industrial center in inner Andalusia. French global automotive supplier Valeo established a factory in the city in the 1980s, making it the largest business in the province. Moreover, the low-cost fuel sales company Petroprix was founded in Martos in 2013, becoming the fastest-growing energy company of Europe in 2024.

== History ==
The city has been linked to the Roman settlement of Colonia Augusta Gemella, and starting in the 8th century was ruled by the Moors under various Islamic states for over 500 years.

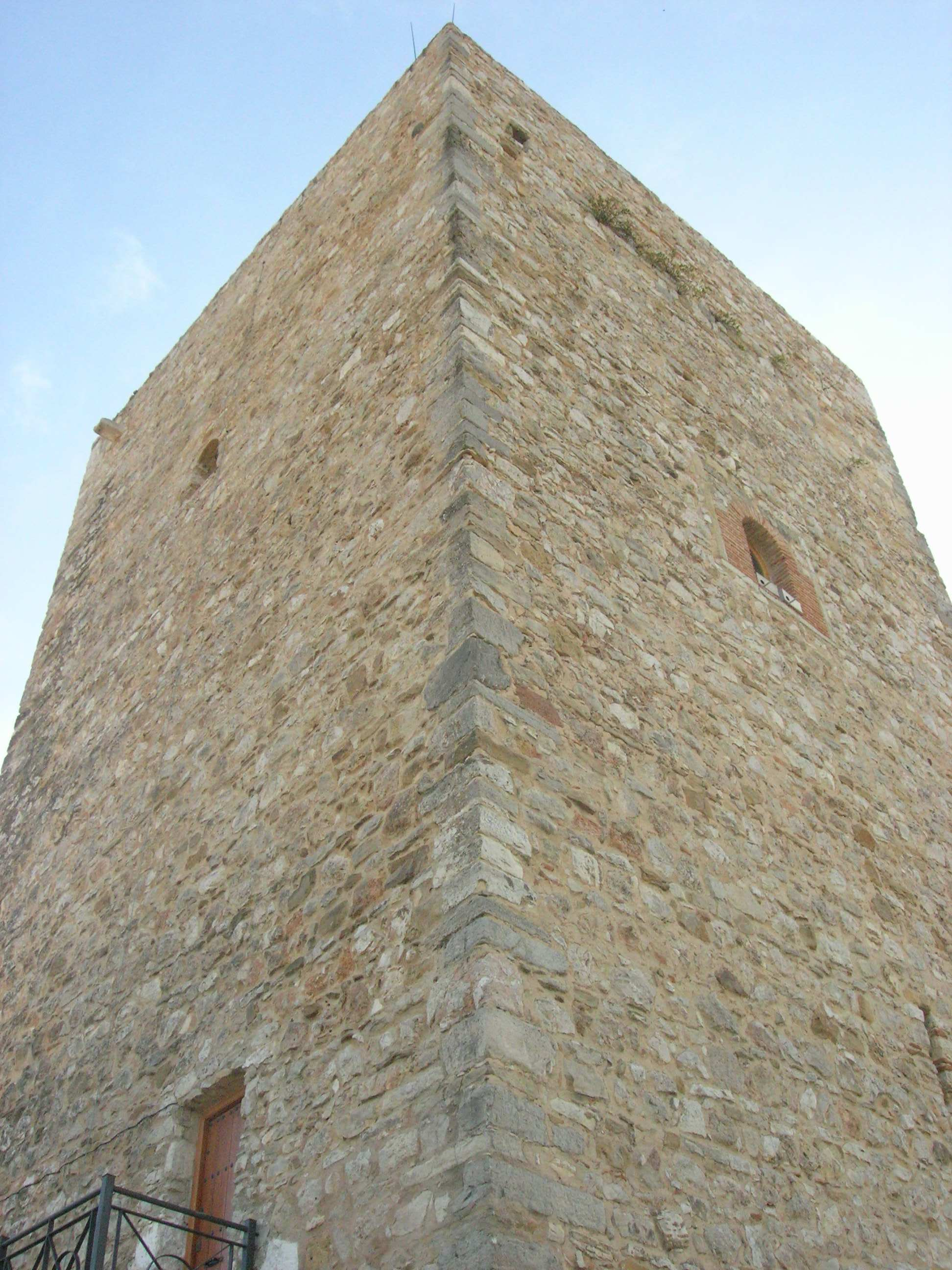
"Torre del Homenaje" of the "Castillo de la Villa"

In 1225, King Ferdinand III of Castile and Leon were handed the city from Al Bayyasi in exchange for helping Al Bayyasi in his war against the Almohads in Andalusia. Subsequently, Ferdinand III incorporated it into his kingdom.

During the Middle Ages, Martos became a strategic place, and its defences were reinforced with the construction of numerous fortifications in the city.

At the end of the 19th century and beginning of the 20th century, Martos underwent significant economic and urban development (reflected in the city's architecture), in large part due to the wealth derived from the industrial production of olive oil. Martos thus became one of the most prosperous cities of eastern Andalusia.

=== Ecclesiastical history ===
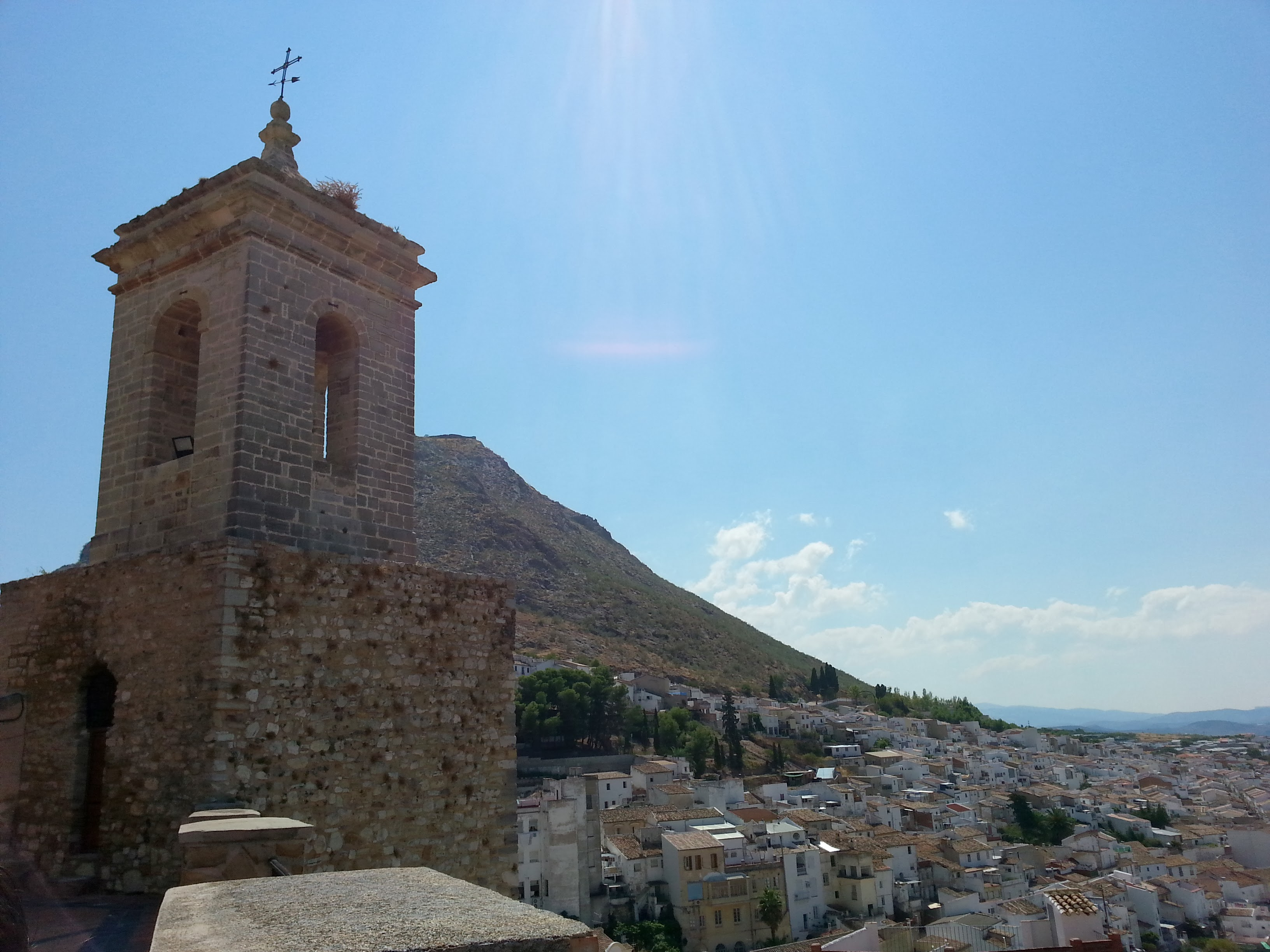
Torre-Campanario de la Villa

Around 250 AD, a bishopric was established in present Martos under the name Tucci, on territory from the suppressed Diocese of Iliturgi. It was a suffragan of the Metropolitan Roman Catholic Archdiocese of Sevilla.

In 350, it lost territory to establish the Diocese of Cástulo (now also a titular see), which it regained at that bishopric's suppression around 400. In 715, it was suppressed to establish the Diocese of Beaza.

Recorded bishops are Rogato (675? – 688?) and Teudisclo (693? – ?).

== Demographics ==
Historical population
Year	Pop.	±%
1842	11,092	—
1857	12,552	+13.2%
1860	13,835	+10.2%
1877	14,621	+5.7%
1887	16,227	+11.0%
1897	16,556	+2.0%
1900	16,682	+0.8%
1910	17,045	+2.2%
1920	19,769	+16.0%
1930	23,682	+19.8%
1940	27,538	+16.3%
1950	30,513	+10.8%
1960	24,159	−20.8%
1970	21,666	−10.3%
1981	22,041	+1.7%
1991	20,945	−5.0%
2001	22,356	+6.7%
2011	24,457	+9.4%
2021	24,296	−0.7%
2023	24,363	+0.3%
Source: National Statistics Institute

According to the National Statistics Institute of Spain, the city's population as of 1 January 2023 was 24,363 people, on a land area of 259.10 km^{2} (100 sq mi).

Martos experienced strong population growth in the first half of the 20th century, reaching a peak of over 30,000 inhabitants in the 1950s. However, the population began to decline rapidly due to a lack of job opportunities that led to a massive rural exodus in Andalusia, particularly in the Province of Jaén and Province of Almería. Most of emigrants left for Madrid, Barcelona and the Spanish Levante.

The population stabilized around 1990 and gradually grew until the early 2010s. This growth was motivated by a strong industrialization of the city, which included better road communications such as the A-316 highway.

The 2008 financial crisis had severe effects in Spain and the province of Jaén in particular, as most cities in the province suffered a serious population decline during the 2010s. Martos was one of the few towns in the area that did not experience such declines, stabilizing at more than 24,000 people for over a decade.

In 2022, there were 1,074 foreigners residing in Martos, accounting for approximately 4.5% of the population. This figure is considerably lower than Spain's average of 13%, but double the percentage in the province of Jaén (approximately 2%).

The population unofficially grows during winter due to migrant workers, who come to the city for olive harvest. These workers mostly come from other parts of Spain and the Maghreb.

== Politics ==
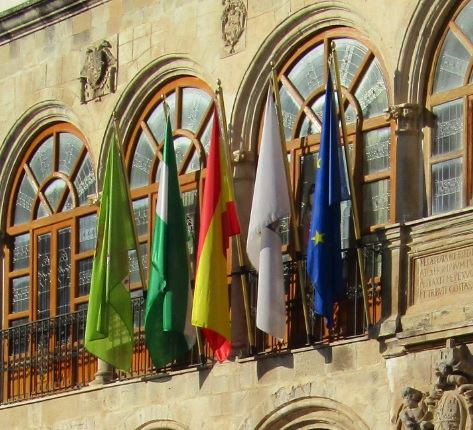
Flags flying on the facade of Martos City Council

The Martos City Council governs the municipality and its members have been elected every four years by universal suffrage since the first municipal elections after the restoration of democracy in Spain in 1979. Because the city's population has always been over 20,000 people but under 50,000 people, the City Council has been composed of 21 councilors in all elections, as provided in the organic law of the General Electoral Regime.

The electoral census is made up of residents over 18 years of age registered in the municipality, whether they are of Spanish nationality or from any member country of the European Union.

The Spanish Socialist Workers' Party (PSOE) has won both the popular and electoral vote in all 12 elections, of which it obtained an absolute majority 8 times (last time in 2023). Despite this, PSOE has not governed in 2 legislative terms: 1995–1999, when the local Agrupación Progresista Independiente reached the office through a tripartite agreement that included the People's Party and Partido Andalucista, and 2011–2015, when Partido Andalucista and the People's Party agreed to share the mayorship (2011–2013 for PA and 2013–2015 for PP).

=== Electoral results ===
Local elections results in Martos
Partido político	1979	1983	1987	1991	1995	1999	2003	2007	2011	2015	2019	2023
Spanish Socialist Workers' Party	12	13	8	12	8	11	14	11	8	11	10	11
People's Party	–	3	2	4	6	4	4	5	6	5	4	6
Vox	–	–	–	–	–	–	–	–	–	–	2	4
Por Andalucía	2	1	0	0	2	0	0	1	1	1	1	0
Ciudadanos (CS)	–	–	–	–	–	–	–	–	–	–	4	–
Partido Andalucista	–	–	–	2	1	1	1	4	6	4	–	–
Agrupación Progresista Independiente	–	–	4	3	4	5	2	–	–	–	–	–
Centro Democrático y Social	4	–	7	0	–	–	–	–	–	–	–	–
Independents	–	4	–	–	–	–	–	–	–	–	–	–
Coalición Democrática	3	–	–	–	–	–	–	–	–	–	–	–

== Culture ==
The town holds several festivals throughout the year:

Event	Date	Details
Carnival	February	
Spring Party	Around 21 March	Parties and concerts for young people are held
Holy Week	Last week of Lent	Considered of tourist interest by the Junta de Andalucía.
Virgin of the Villa	First Tuesday after Holy Week	
Saint Amador	5 May	Patron saint of the town
Romería of the Virgin of the Victory	Last weekend of May	Held in the Rock of Martos.
Corpus Christi	Thursday after Trinity Sunday; 60 days after Easter, or the Sunday immediately following this	Children who have received their first communion that year participate in a procession
Saint Martha	29 July	Patron saint of the town
Festival of Saint Bartholomew	Late August	Major festival of the city
Festival of the Olive	8 December	A festive week symbolizing the start of the olive harvest season, first held in 1980.

The most important sports club is Martos CD, a Tercera Federación football club.

== Sister cities ==
Martos is twinned with the following cities:

- Mora, Spain
- Baler, Philippines
- Cellamare, Italy

== Notable people ==
- Francisco Ureña Navas (1871–1936), publisher and poet

== See also ==
- List of municipalities in Jaén

== Sources and external links ==
- WikiSatellite view of Martos at WikiMapia
- GigaCatolic former and titular see of Tucci
