= Jérica =

- Town
- Flag Coat of arms

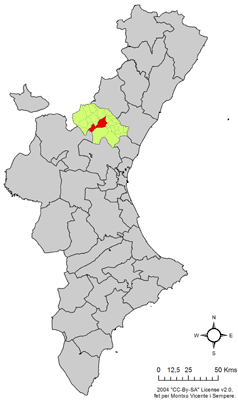
- Location in the Valencian Community, Spain

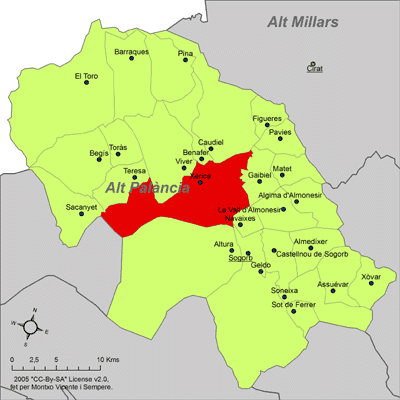
- Location in the comarca Alto Palancia
- Coordinates: 39°54′N 00°34′W
- Country: Spain
- Province: Castellón
- Comarca: Alto Palancia

Government
  - Mayor: Jorge Peiró Ripoll (PP) (2008- )

Area
  - Total: 78.30 km^{2} (30.23 sq mi)
- Elevation: 523 m (1,716 ft)

Population (2025-01-01)
  - Total: 1,764
  - Density: 22.53/km^{2} (58.35/sq mi)
  - Language: Spanish
- Demonym(s): Jericano/a (Spanish); Xericà/Xericana (Valencian)
- Postcode: 12450
- Website: (in Spanish)Official Website

Jérica (Valencian: Xèrica) is a town in the Castellón province of Valencian Community, Spain. It is in the comarca (region) of Alto Palancia. Its population was 1,703 at the end of 2009.

The town's name is based in Arabic شارقة (šāriqa), meaning the eastern slope of a mountain. In Arabian documents the settlement has also been referred to as قلعة الاشراق (qalʿa aš-širāq), "Castle of the Sheriffs".

== Geography ==
Jérica lies on the natural pathway between Aragón and the Comunidad Valenciana in the southern part of the provincia de Castellón.

The municipality has an area of 78.30 km^{2}. It is crossed by the river Palancia, and an area in the south is part of the Calderona mountain range. However, no part of the municipality is in the Sierra Calderona National Park.

The town centre is located at a height of 523 m, on a rocky promontory along the Palancia river channel. The precipice is very difficult to access and therefore, the population has settled in the opposite direction, staggered along the slope of the hill.

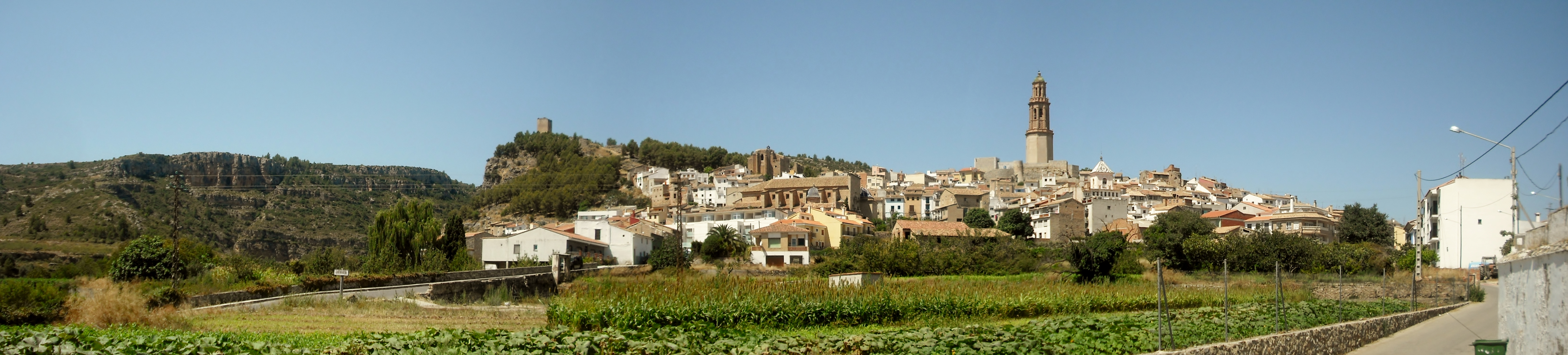
A view of Jérica

The town may be accessed via Highway A-23 (from Sagunto to Zaragoza), utilizing exit 42 (Jérica-Caudiel), or via N-234. The town lies 67 km from Valencia, 74 km from Castellón de la Plana, 40 km from Sagunto, and 78 km from Teruel.

Train service to the town is available. A station (Jérica-Viver) in the northern part of the town serves the C-5 Line, which connects with Valencia and Castellón de la Plana.

=== Districts and pedanías ===
In the municipality of Jérica there are two population centres:

- Los Ángeles
- Novaliches

=== Bordering localities ===
Altura, Benafer, Caudiel, Gaibiel, Navajas, Sacañet, Segorbe, Teresa, Vall de Almonacid and Viver in the province of Castellón and Alcublas in the province of Valencia.

== History ==
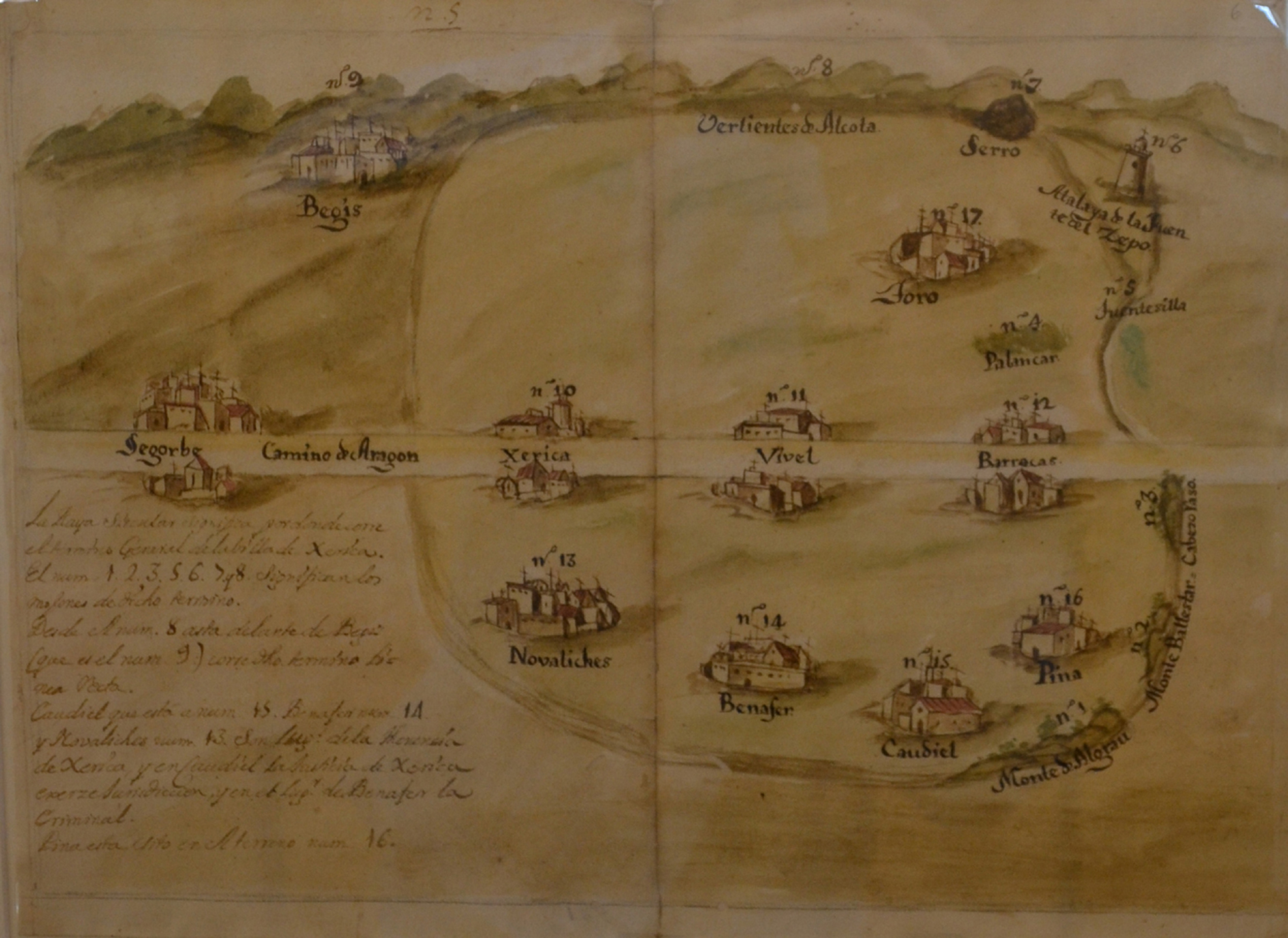
Map Jerica general term, which appear drawn all populations and the road of Aragon (1717).

The first evidence of human settlement is from the Neolithic period, from human remains found in the Herreros Cave (Cave of the Blacksmiths). Several settlements from the Iberian period exist within the castle grounds.

The municipality has the highest number of Roman artifacts discovered in the comarca, especially the large quantity of gravestones, including the unique gravestone of Quintia Prova of Hispania on which the cost of a Roman arch with two statues is mentioned.

The first references to the present nucleus of the settlement are in the period of Muslims' presence in the area, including the Taifa of Valencia and following the disintegration of the Caliph of Córdoba in 1027 and then the subsequent capture of the area by El Cid in 1098. The first stages of the towers and the oldest parts of the castle are from this time.

On 5 February 1235, the area was captured by the Christian army in order to control the sacristan of Girona, Gillém de Montgriu, although the Muslim population were not expelled.

In 1249 the Carta Puebla was issued, which authorized the occupation of Jérica, since it was evident by then that the local population were moving into the area. In 1255 King James I of Aragon transferred authority over the villa of Jérica to Teresa Gil de Vidaurre and to the son which had been born from their relationship (he also ceded the villa of Alcublas to Lady Teresa Gil in 1257). Their son was James I, Baron of Jérica. On 29 November 1255, in Calatayud, King James I granted the privilege that the Camino Real (Royal Road) from Aragón to Valencia pass through Jérica, and abandoning the previous road, which lay relatively far from the villa.

In 1261 King James I granted temporal authority over the castle and the villa of Jérica to his son, James I of Jérica. In 1272 he confirmed this power in his will. In 1284 James II of Jérica succeeded him, and in 1286, King Alfonso IV of Aragon confirmed James' control of the villa. It was governed by James II until 1321, when it passed to his son Jaime (James III of Jérica). James III received permission of King Alfonso IV to strengthen and fortify the existing walls.

Don Pedro of Jérica controlled the villa until 1361, when he willed it to his sons Juan and Pedro (Juan Alfonso held seniority). During this period, intermittent war occurred between the kings of Aragón and Castilla, and in 1363 the Castilian army entered the villa utilising the castle and the church that was being erected.

Juan Alfonso died without issue in 1369. The villa was then ceded back to Peter IV of Aragon as an estate. The King decided in 1372 to make a condado (land which is granted to a Count) and give it to the Infante Don Martin as a Fiefdom, with the stipulation that it return to The Crown when Martin would marry María de Luna, señora de Segorbe.

The villa's direct attachment to the Royal Crown did not last long; in 1417 King Alfonso V of Aragon ceded the señorío (noble estate) to his brother, the Infante Don Juan.

The señorío only lasted a few years; in 1431 Don Juan sold it (illegally) to Francisco Zarzuela. This caused years of misery for the people of Jérica, who suffered with the tyrannous government of a family who cared nothing for them.

This continued until 1479 when negotiations between the town's leaders and King Ferdinand el Católico resulted in the villa's being returned to control of The Crown.

In 1537, Carlos I of Spain gave the señorío to the Duque de Calabria. On his death the estate was willed to the monks of the Monastery of San Miguel of the Kings of Valencia. A litigation between the governors of the villa and Emperor Carlos I occurred, as they wished to be returned to governance under The Crown. This occurred in 1564, during the reign of Felipe I. In 1565 it abandoned the legislative control of Aragon, of which it had been a part, taking in its place that of Valencia. Since that time the villa has had its own shield.

In the second decade of the eighteenth century, after the close of the War of the Spanish Succession, King Felipe V, desiring to reward the loyalty and services of the Duke of Berwick (who had won the Battle of Almansa), created the Duchy of Liria and Jérica, and granted it to the Duke. This first Duke of the newly created Duchy was James FitzJames (known locally as Jacobo Fitz-James Stuart) was the son of King James II of England, who had also named him Duke of Berwick and Viceroy of Ireland. He was a marshal in the French Army and an officer in the Spanish army during the War of Succession.

The third Duke of the Duchy was named for his grandfather, the first Duke. He married María Teresa de Silva y Palafox Álvarez de Toledo, Duchess of Alba. After that, the title passed through the House of Alba. At present it is held by Cayetana Fitz-James Stuart, of Liria.

During the Carlist Wars (1833 to 1876), troops of the Carlist faction established themselves within the Jérica castle and fortified it strongly. Near the end, troops of the opposing faction (los liberales) stormed the castle and demolished its walls.

The villa suffered such destruction and damage during the Spanish Civil War that its leaders petitioned the Federal government for inclusion on the list of Devastated Regions, which meant the state was in charge of reconstructing numerous buildings.

=== Historic buildings ===
This area has been known as a distinct villa since the Roman Era, and through the Saracen times. It is noted as a significant location, due to its imposing castle with its strong walls dominated by turrets.

The religious monument Torre de las Campanas (Tower of the Bells) was constructed in 1634 in style of Mudéjar on the site of a previous works. It is a unique example of the style in the Valencian Community . Due to its position as the highest construction in the area, it is the most familiar image of it.

The area has two civil monuments: a castle and watchtowers. There is a castle, of which the Roman foundations can still be observed, although most of the construction is of the Muslim period. The best conserved area is the main tower, the Torreta. This construction is robust: it is square with walls more than 1.5 m thick. The vaults in the centre of the ground floor are remarkable. These Muslim watchtowers, Torres de los Ordaces y la Muela, overlook the castle. Presently, they are in need of conservation.

There are two main plazas. The larger is called del Olmo, an ample, irregular polygon, where the weekly market and the annual fair are held. The smaller plaza, adjacent to the chapel, is a parallelogram of 11 m x 7 m dimension. There are three smaller plazas called del Loreto, Tiendas (shops), and Carnicerías (meat markets).

On Arrabal Avenue near the center of the town is the Town Hall, which flies the town's flag. The municipal jail is located in this building. The hospital for the poor and needy is on this same street. There are also several churches, including la Iglesia de Santa Águeda la Nueva in the southern part of town, which dates from 1835. A cemetery is located at 150 m from the town.

== Demography ==
The population was 1,577 in 2005, with 1482 around the main centre and 95 in the pedanía of Novaliches.

=== Table of population by year ===
Year	1900	1910	1920	1930	1940	1950	1960	1970	1981	1991	2000	2005
Population	3,119	3,252	2,980	2,747	2,368	2,712	2,399	2,186	1,680	1,608	1,554	1,577

== Administration ==
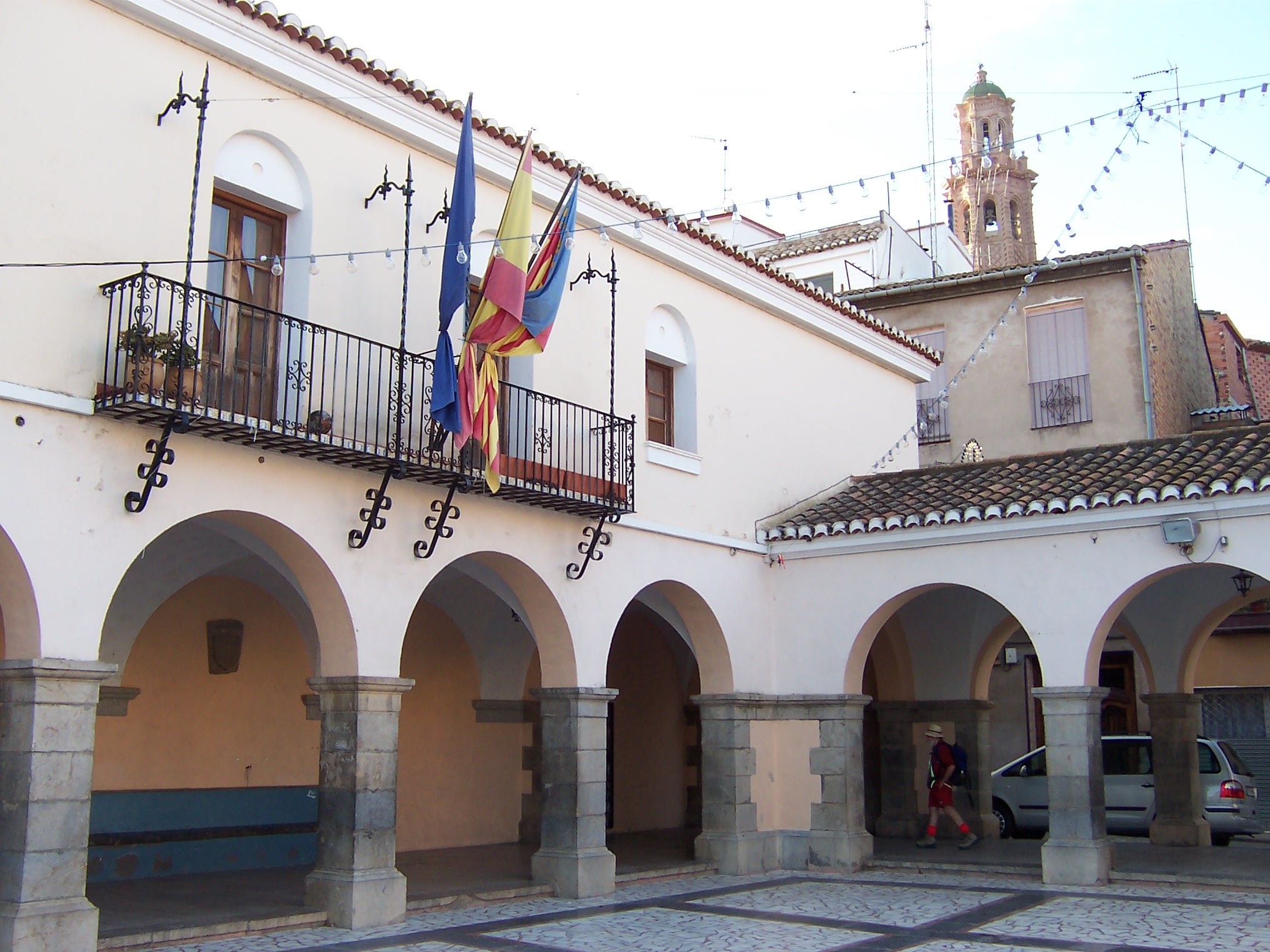
Jérica town hall

The current mayor is Amadeo Edo Salvador of the Socialist Party of Valencia Country, part of the Spanish Socialist Workers' Party.

== Economy ==
Traditionally, the primary sector has been of great importance in the Jericano economy. The agriculture of arid land has been important, producing olive, carob and almond crops. Recently, rural tourism has been an important sector; centering on the medieval market.

== Transport ==
The simplest access route by road is via the Sagunto to Somport autopista A-23. The town is to 67 km from Valencia, 74 km from Castellón de la Plana, 40 km from Sagunto and 78 km from Teruel.

The town can be accessed by rail as a station (Jérica-Viver) close to the town is on the C-5 del núcleo de cercanías de Valencia Valencia-Caudiel that connects Valencia and Castellón de la Plana.

== Festivals ==
- 17 January - Fiestas de San Antón (Celebrations of San Antón) The animals and assistants on the church roll are blessed. The origin of the celebration is very old.
- 5 February - Fiesta de Santa Agueda (Celebration of Santa Agueda, the patron of Jérica) It is a local celebration commemorating reconquering of the Villa by the troops of James I of Aragon. There is an offering to Santa, the Mass and Procession in the streets by the locals. For years it has been accompanied by bullfighting and also different activities like exhibitions, cultural days, etc.
- Easter - The most outstanding events are the celebrations of Maundy Thursday and Good Friday, the nocturnal procession of the Blood of Christ, Patron of Jérica. Previously it was accompanied by the licensed soldiers, the “Encounter” where the Sacred Heart of Jesus and the Virgin Mary, after their routes through different streets, are in the seat and this makes three reverences.
- The Wednesday following Pentecost there is the popular “Joust” keeping up medieval traditions.
- A complete weekend of June Celebrations in honor to the Sacred Heart of Jesus, with religious acts, a verbena etc.
- The second Wednesday of July is the Fiesta del Cristo de la Sangre (July festival of the blood of Christ) The origin of this celebration goes back to the foundation in Villa of the Convent of the Capuchins, who brought Christianity to the area.
- Third Sunday of July - Domingo de las Fuentes (Sunday of the Sources) There is a concert by the Municipal Band.
- Second week of August - Celebration in honor to the Virgin of the Abandoned ones, organized by the town veterans.
- Weekend of the 16 of August Celebrations in honor to San Roque, organized by the young people of the town. If this is not a weekend then the next weekend is used
- The first Saturday of September - Romería to the Sanctuary of the Santa Cave.
- Second weekend of September - Celebrations of the Daughters of Maria, with religious acts, a verbena, etc.
- Third Sunday of September - Fiestas en honor a la Divina Pastora (Celebrations in honor to the Divine Shepherd). They are, perhaps, the most popular celebrations of Jérica. During the first week there are a range of events, from the presentation of local senor and junior fair queens with their respective court, to the Rosary of the Shepherd, verbenas, the offering, the “varieties”, the junior Sunday Mass, games, the Vole, the Bacalá, etc.

== Notable residents ==
- Baltasar Calvo, Spanish friar and rebel (died 1808)
