= Viver =

- Town
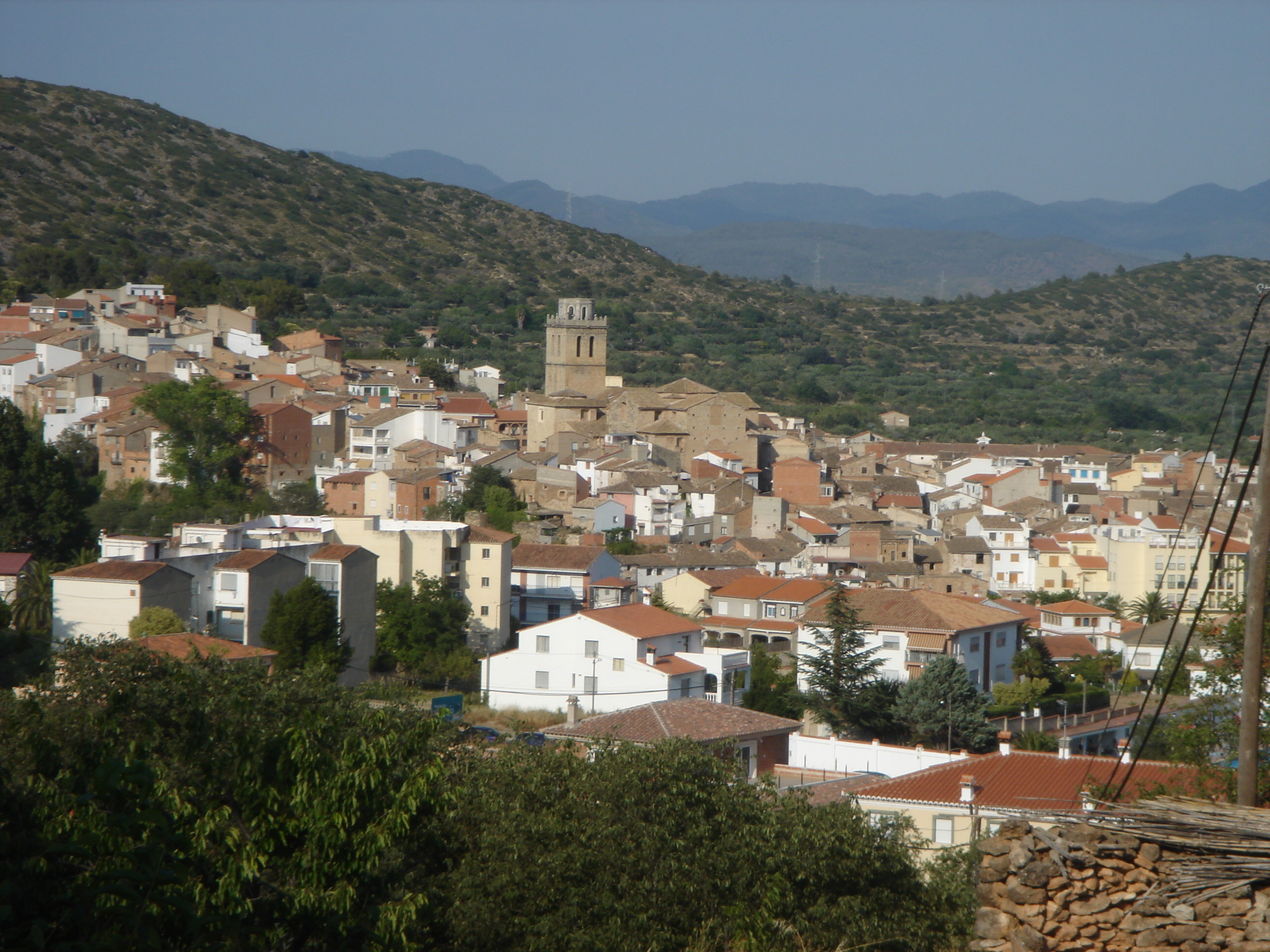
- Skyline of Viver

- Coat of arms

- Location of Viver within Spain
- Coordinates: 39°55′15″N 0°35′43″W
- Country: Spain
- Autonomous community: Valencian Community
- Founded: 193 BC

Government
  - Type: Mayor-council
  - Body: Ayuntamiento de Viver
  - Mayor: María Nieves Simón Campos (PSOE)

Area
  - Total: 44.9 km^{2} (17.3 sq mi)
- Elevation: 559 m (1,834 ft)

Population (2025-01-01)
  - Total: 1,729
  - Density: 38.5/km^{2} (99.7/sq mi)
- Demonym(s): Viverense viverense (es)
- Time zone: UTC+1 (CET)
  - Summer (DST): UTC+2 (CEST)
- Postal code: 12460
- Area code: +34 (ES) + 964 (CS)
- Patron Saints: Francis of Paola; Michael (archangel)
- Website: www.viver.es

Viver is a town in the Castellón province of Valencian Community, Spain. It is in the comarca (region) of Alto Palancia.

== Geography ==
The municipality has an area of 49.9 square kilometres (19.3 sq mi). It is crossed by the river Palancia, and an area in the south is part of the Calderona mountain range. However, no part of the municipality is in the Sierra Calderona National Park.

The town centre is located at a height of 559 metres (1,834 ft), on a rocky promontory along the San Roque Mountain. The population has settled in the opposite direction, staggered along the slope of the hill.

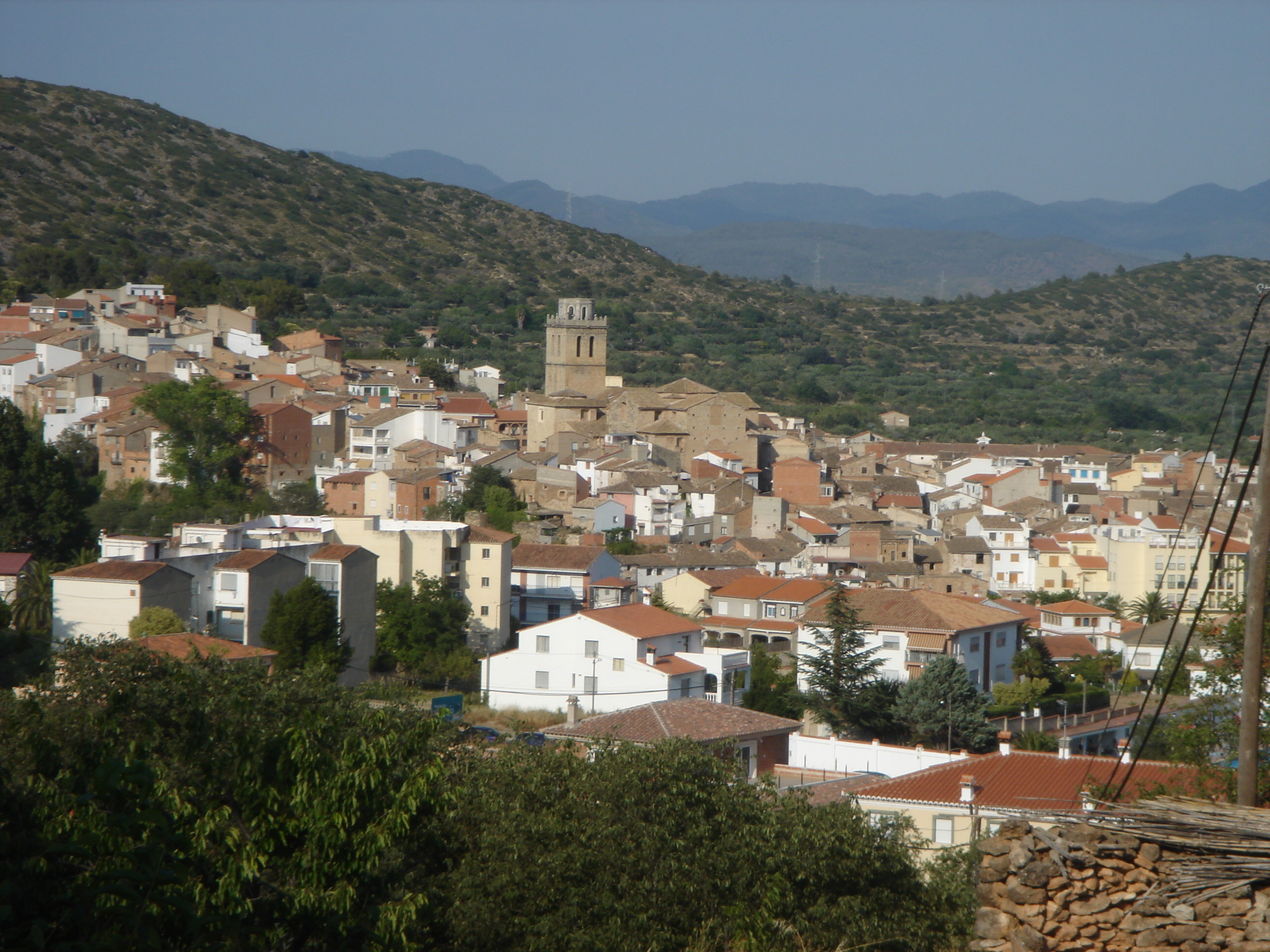
A view of Viver

=== Districts and pedanías ===
In the municipality of Viver, there are four population centres:

- Viver
- Masías de Ragudo
- Masías de Parrela
- Masías del Cristo
- Masías del Rio

=== Bordering localities ===
Surrounding Viver are: Teresa, Torás, Barracas, Pina de Montalgrao, Benafer, Jérica, all localities in the province of Castellón.

== History ==
Historical population
Year	Pop.	±%
1900	2,479	—
1910	2,742	+10.6%
1920	2,497	−8.9%
1930	1,949	−21.9%
1940	2,071	+6.3%
1950	3,005	+45.1%
1960	2,248	−25.2%
1970	2,056	−8.5%
1981	1,683	−18.1%
1991	1,205	−28.4%
2000	1,297	+7.6%
2006	1,511	+16.5%
2007	1,611	+6.6%

There is evidence of human settlements during the Paleolithic period in the cave of El Sargal.

The first historical data documented for Viver is that the Roman Marco Poncio Catón founded this locality, with the name of Belsino, in 193 BC. Later, he changed the name to Vivarium, from which the present name was derived.

Around 1237–1239, King Jaime I conquered Viver from the Arabs. On 24 April 1244, the King granted to the population the title of "Real Villa" (royal estate), and 12 April 1367 the Puebla Letter is granted to him by Juan Alonso, Sire of Jérica.

Later, this villa was given back to the King and finally sold to the Duke of Calabria, Virrey of Valencia, in 1537. The Duke died on 26 October 1550, bequeathing his estate to the monastery of San Miguel of Reyes in Valencia,(which was founded by him), and the monks took possession of Viver.

During the Spanish Civil War, Viver underwent serious deterioration. In 1945, the Parochial Church was recovered, and many of the houses were reconstructed.

== Administration ==
The current mayor is Patricio Gómez Gómez of the Socialist Party of Valencian Country, part of the Spanish Socialist Workers' Party. He was elected to office in 2011.

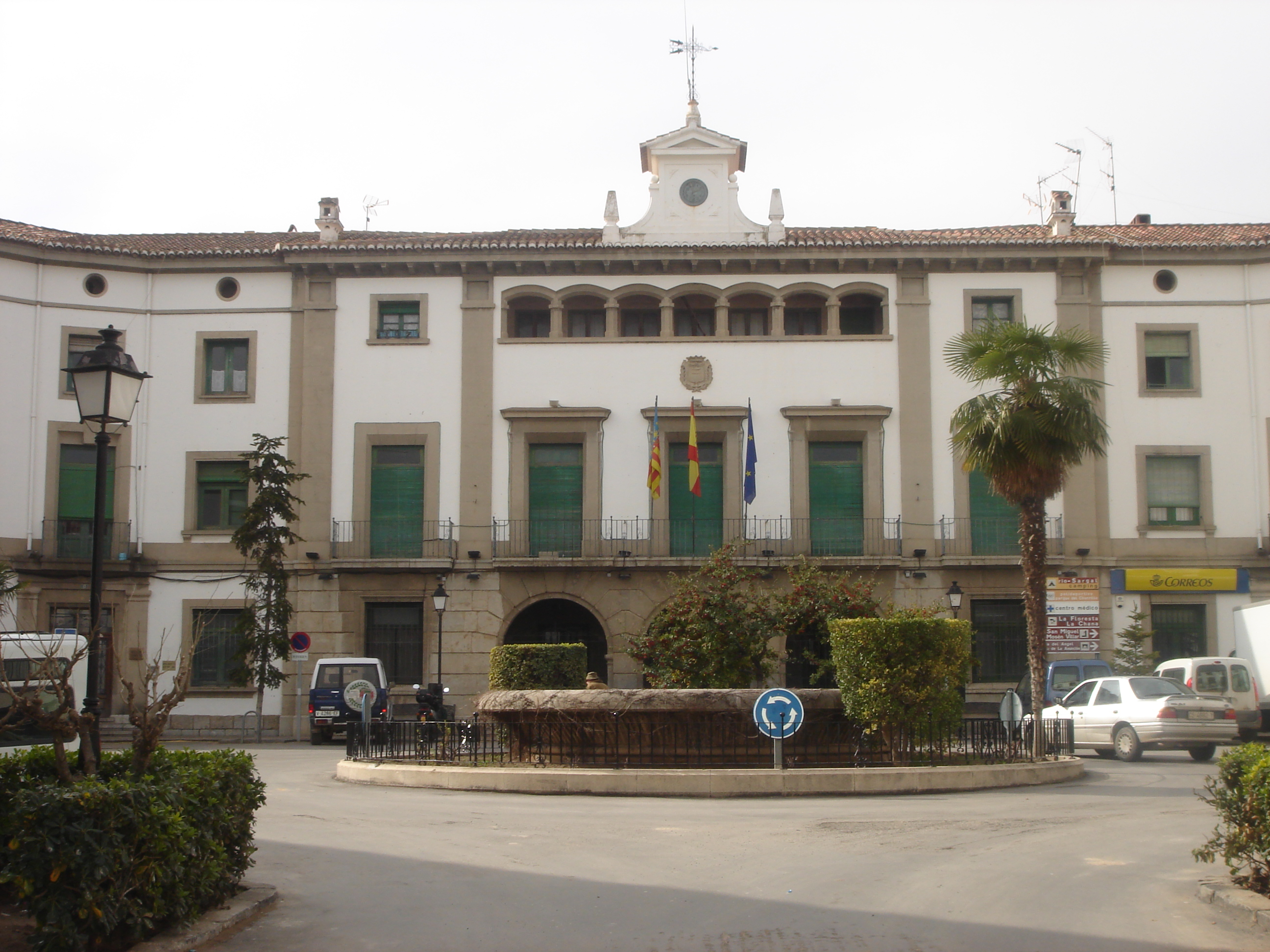
Viver's Town Hall

== Economy ==
Traditionally, the viverense economy has been based mainly in the primary sector, the agricultural, stressing the vine, but as a result of the scourge of phylloxera in the late 19th century, the almond and olive had become more important. Destacable is the production of olives of high quality. Lately, rural tourism has been growing, through the construction of several farmhouses.

== Transport ==
The simplest access route by road is via the Sagunto to Somport autopista A-23. The town is 69 km (43 mi) from Valencia, 70 km (43 mi) from Castellón de la Plana, 40 km (25 mi) from Sagunto, and 70 km from Teruel.

The town can be accessed by rail with a station (Jérica-Viver) at 2 km (1.2 mi). The town is on the C-5 del núcleo de cercanías de Valencia Valencia-Caudiel that connects Valencia and Castellón de la Plana.

== Festivals ==
- Ride Reyes. Celebrated January 5. The "Reyes Magos" come in carriages, and there is a parade by the main place. At the end of the ride, every child attending events is given a gift in the hall of the House of Culture.
- Saint Anthony. It is held on the Saturday and Sunday following January 17. On Saturday, horse racing is held in the Natural Place de la Floresta, and at night, there is a verbena (dance party). On Sunday morning, mass is celebrated in honor of Tong Anton, which blesses animals in the main square and distributes a roll of San Anton to participants. In the evening, there are popular games at the Plaza Vieja.
- Carnival. Celebrated the last week of February. Everyone in disguise conducts a parade through the streets of the town. And then there is a verbena or discomóvil. Everyone wearing disguises gains free admission.
- Fallas. The following takes place on Thursday, Friday and Saturday to 19 March
- San Francisco de Paula. These festivities are held on Friday and Sunday in the second week of Passover. In that bonfire of burning, the Holy Masses and processions are held in honor of San Francisco, and rice is distributed from the traditional Holy vendecido by Cura del pueblo. This rice has been distributed for years, when the monks of the monastery of San Francisco de Paula celebrated the holiday.
- Feast of the Olive. It is generally held in June, in the Parque de La Floresta. At this fair, there are more than 50 exhibitors, among these exhibitors are shops of the people and cultural associations of the people. This fair is organized by the Exmo. City Hall and the Olive Cooperativa de Viver, also has a number of sponsors.
- August Feast takes place over the month of August. The first week is presented for the queen of the festivities and to her court of honor. The night of August 15 is for Saint Roque in which he performs at 00:00, with a verbena (party), and people often spend the night without sleep; at 7:00 in the church square, reeds are split and handkerchiefs and people rise in romeria until Ermita de San Roque; there is a mass in honor of San Roque, and a blessed roll is distributed at the end. The penultimate week of August is celebrated as a one-week taurine.
- Festivities are held between September and October, in honor of St. Michael the Archangel and the Virgin de Gracia.
