= Caudiel =

Coordinates: 39°57′N 0°34′W

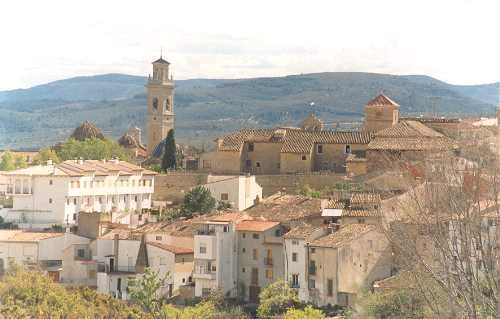
- General view

- Flag Coat of arms
- Interactive map of Caudiel
- Country: Spain
- Province: Castellón
- Comarca: Alto Palancia

Area
  - Total: 62.40 km^{2} (24.09 sq mi)
- Elevation: 632 m (2,073 ft)

Population (2025-01-01)
  - Total: 735
  - Density: 11.8/km^{2} (30.5/sq mi)
- Demonym: Caudielense

Caudiel is a municipality in the comarca of Alto Palancia, Castellón, Valencia, Spain.

== Geography ==
The surrounding municipalities are Benafer, Fuente la Reina, Gaibiel, Higueras, Jérica, Montán, Pavías, Pina de Montalgrao, Villanueva de Viver and San Agustín. The population in 2018 was reported as 648.

== Demographics ==
Historical Population
1900	1910	1920	1930	1940	1950	1960	1970	1981	1991	2000	2004	2005	2007
1.768	1.849	1.588	1.417	1.286	1.311	1.103	930	618	666	695	704	701	714
