= Almonacid =

Almonacid may refer to:

- Almonacid de la Cuba, municipality in the province of Zaragoza, Aragon, Spain
  - Almonacid de la Cuba Dam
- Almonacid de la Sierra, municipality in the province of Zaragoza
- Almonacid del Marquesado municipality located in the province of Cuenca, Castile-La Mancha, Spain
- Almonacid de Zorita municipality located in the province of Guadalajara, Castile-La Mancha
- Almonacid de Toledo, municipality in the province of Toledo, Castile-La Mancha
- Almonacid de los Oteros, former name of Valdesaz de los Oteros, a village in Pajares de los Oteros municipality, province of León, Castile and León
- Battle of Almonacid
- Vall de Almonacid (La Vall d'Almonesir), municipality in the comarca of Alto Palancia, Castellón Province, Valencia, Spain
- Algimia de Almonacid municipality in the comarca of Alto Palancia, Land of Valencia

== People ==
- Patricio Almonacid, Chilean professional road bicycle racer
