= Teresa Gil de Vidaure =

13th-century noblewoman

Teresa Gil de Vidaure (died on 15 July 1285) was the common law wife of King James I of Aragon, but never a queen. Claiming that she was a leper, James left her in order to pursue an incestuous relationship with Berenguela Alfonso. Teresa Gil died in seclusion in a monastery she had founded.

== Royal mistress ==
Teresa Gil de Vidaure was born in Navarre to the nobleman Juan de Vidaure. She was said to be a woman of exceptional beauty, and King James I became attracted to her. She requested him to promise her that he would marry her. He made the promise, but broke it by marrying Violant of Hungary in December 1235. The king and Teresa Gil, who eventually married Sancho Pérez de Lodosa, carried on with their relationship throughout his marriage to Queen Violant.

== Openly secret marriage ==
Teresa Gil was already widowed when the queen died in 1251, leaving the couple free to pursue their relationship openly and to enter a common law marriage not consecrated by the Roman Catholic Church. In 1255, the king issued a charter granting Teresa Gil the tax-exempt castle of Jérica, to be inherited by their descendants, male or female, after her death. Two years later, he granted her the villages Bejís, Liria, Andilla and Altura. The charters do not mention Teresa Gil as the king's wife; in fact, their form is the one used for concubinage contracts. Thus, historians have sometimes referred to her as the king's concubine, but James's letter to Pope Clement IV in 1265 confirms that they were married. Nevertheless, she was never queen. The couple had their first son, James, around 1255, and their second, Peter, in c. 1259.

== The king's great matter ==
In 1265, the marriage began breaking apart. James took another mistress, his cousin Berenguela Alfonso. The pope admonished him severely for this incestuous relationship. The king wished to end the marriage and repudiated Teresa Gil on the pretext that she had contracted leprosy. Both wrote to Clement IV regarding the annulment of the union; the king to request it and his wife to prevent it. The pope ruled that, although it was not sanctioned by the Church, the marriage was consummated and thus indissoluble. He sharply chastised the king for even requesting the annulment.

Clement IV died in 1268, and Andrés Albalat, bishop of Valencia, declared the marriage null and void. Clement IV's successor, Pope Gregory X, allowed the case to be treated in Rome and confirmed his predecessor's decision. James attempted procuring an annulment again in 1275, this time claiming that he had had sexual relations with Teresa Gil's cousin before their marriage (which would have rendered the marriage invalid), but the argument was no more successful than the previous one.

== Seclusion ==
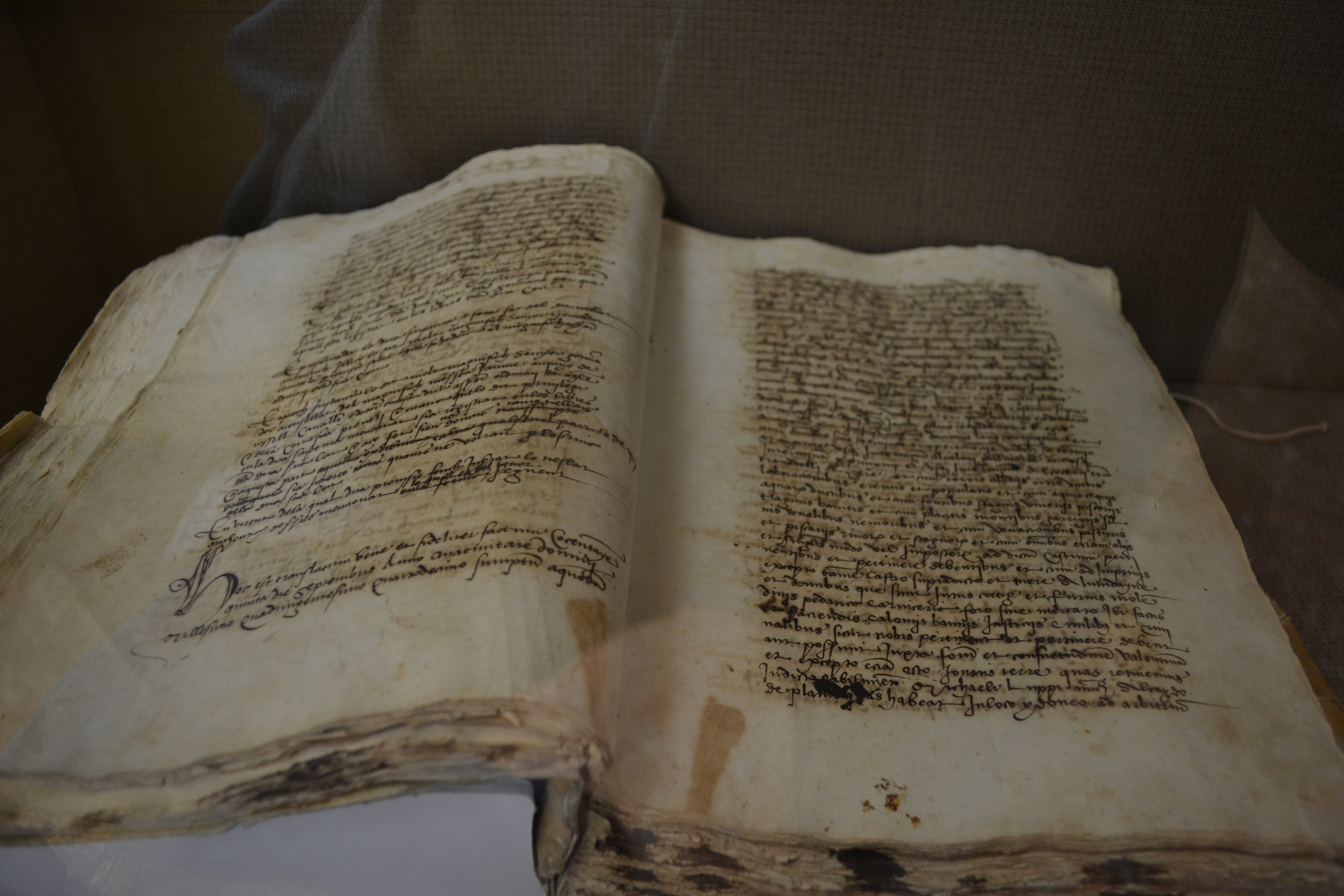
A charter relating to the tower of Almudaina and the castle of Planes issued by Teresa Gil de Vidaure and her son Jaume de Jèrica in 1278

Teresa Gil was forced to spend the remainder of her life in the Cistercian monastery of Zaidia de Valencia, which she had founded. She died on 15 July 1285 and was buried in the monastery. The tomb no longer survives, though the epitaph does.
