= Church of San Juan Bautista (Caudiel) =

- Iglesia de San Juan Bautista
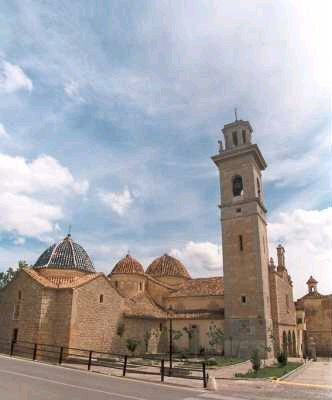
- Interactive map of Church of San Juan Bautista

General information
- Type: Church
- Architectural style: Baroque
- Location: Caudiel, Castellón, Valencian Community, Spain, Caudiel, Spain
- Coordinates: 39°56′44″N 0°34′03″W
- Inaugurated: 1616

The Church of San Juan Bautista (Spanish: Iglesia de San Juan Bautista) is a church located in Caudiel, a town in the province of Castellón, Valencian Community. Founded originally in 1616 by Pedro Miralles, originally belonging to the Augustinians it was founded as a philosophy and art school.

After the confiscation of Catholic Church property in Spain, Madrid ceded the church to the community, as a town hall, school and hospital. The rest of the building, including the chapel, main church building and priest's dressing room has survived almost as it was. In 1866, the dome of the old parish church collapsed; this building today houses the main town hall.

The church itself is a wide nave in the shape of a cross with interconnected cloisters for chapels and a half-orange dome, all in the Baroque style. The chapel is a barrel vault with a large flared arch with the dome in the centre of the room. Fourteen canvases cover the room; with a golden altar. Its highly decorated appearance makes it stand out.

The tiled plinth has seven canvases that are works by the La Mancha painter Gaspar de la Huerta. This plinth is regarded as one of the best known examples of Valencian Baroque architecture.

There is also a small image of the Virgin of the Lost Child, known locally as the Virgen del Colmillo ("Virgin of the Tusk"), so called due to its carving from an elephant tusk. Dating from the fifteenth century, it is said that the Saint Vincent Ferrer carried this small image with him when preaching and undertaking pilgrimages. He arrived at the church in Caudel on 21 October 1627.
