= Higueras =

- Municipality
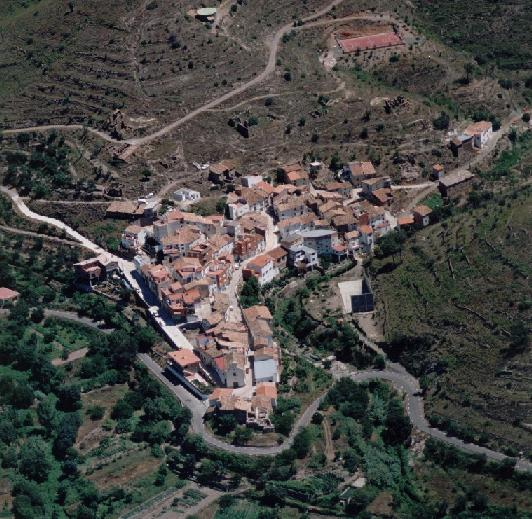

- Flag Coat of arms

- Location in Valencian Community
- Coordinates: 39°59′03.47″N 0°30′06.27″W
- Country: Spain
- Community: Valencia
- Province: Castellón
- Comarca: Alto Palancia

Government
  - Mayor: Francisco Gimeno Torregrosa

Area
  - Total: 11.80 km^{2} (4.56 sq mi)
- Elevation: 671 m (2,201 ft)

Population (2025-01-01)
  - Total: 54
  - Density: 4.6/km^{2} (12/sq mi)
- Demonym: Higuereño/a
- Postal code: 12449
- Website: Official website

Higueras is a Spanish municipality in the comarca of Alto Palancia, in the Province of Castellón, Valencian Community. In 2015, the population was 91.

== History ==
The village was first mentioned in the 13th century as Torre de la Higuera.

== Geography ==
The municipality, part of the judicial district of Segorbe, borders with Caudiel, Montán, Pavías and Torralba del Pinar. The town has an elevation of 2,201 feet (671 m).
