= Soneja =

- Municipality
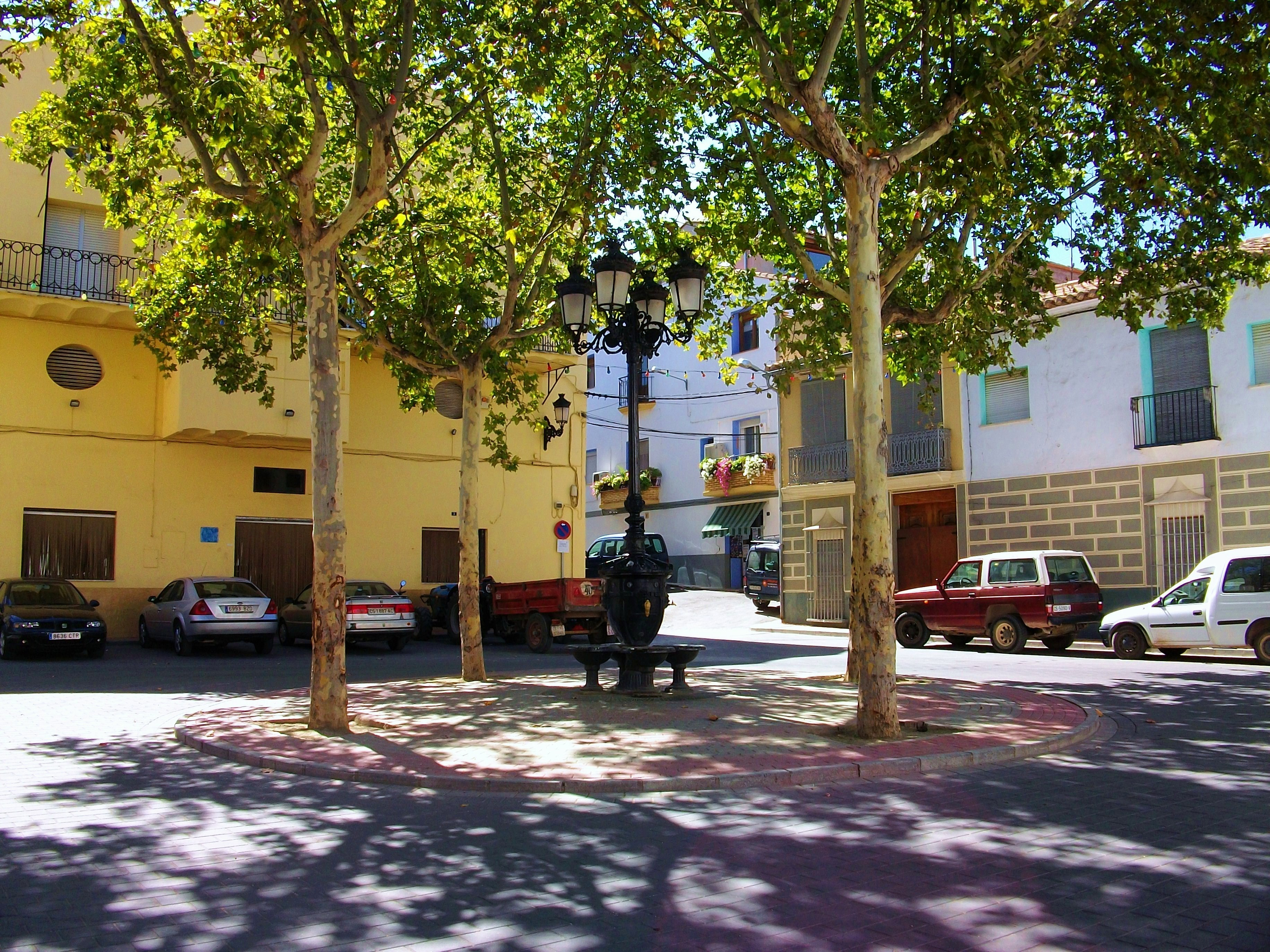
- Soneja Main Square

- Flag Coat of arms

- Location of Soneja. Soneja (Valencian Community)
- Coordinates: 39°49′N 0°25′W
- Country: Spain
- Community: Valencia
- Province: Castellón
- Comarca: Alto Palancia

Government
  - Mayor: Benjamín Escriche Rivas (PSPV-PSOE)

Area
  - Total: 28.97 km^{2} (11.19 sq mi)

Population (2023)
  - Total: 1,508
  - Density: 52.05/km^{2} (134.8/sq mi)
- Time zone: UTC+1 (CET)
  - Summer (DST): UTC+2 (CEST)
- Postal code: 12480
- Website: www.soneja.es

Soneja is a municipality in the comarca of Alto Palancia, Castellón, Valencia, Spain.
