= Matet =

- Municipality
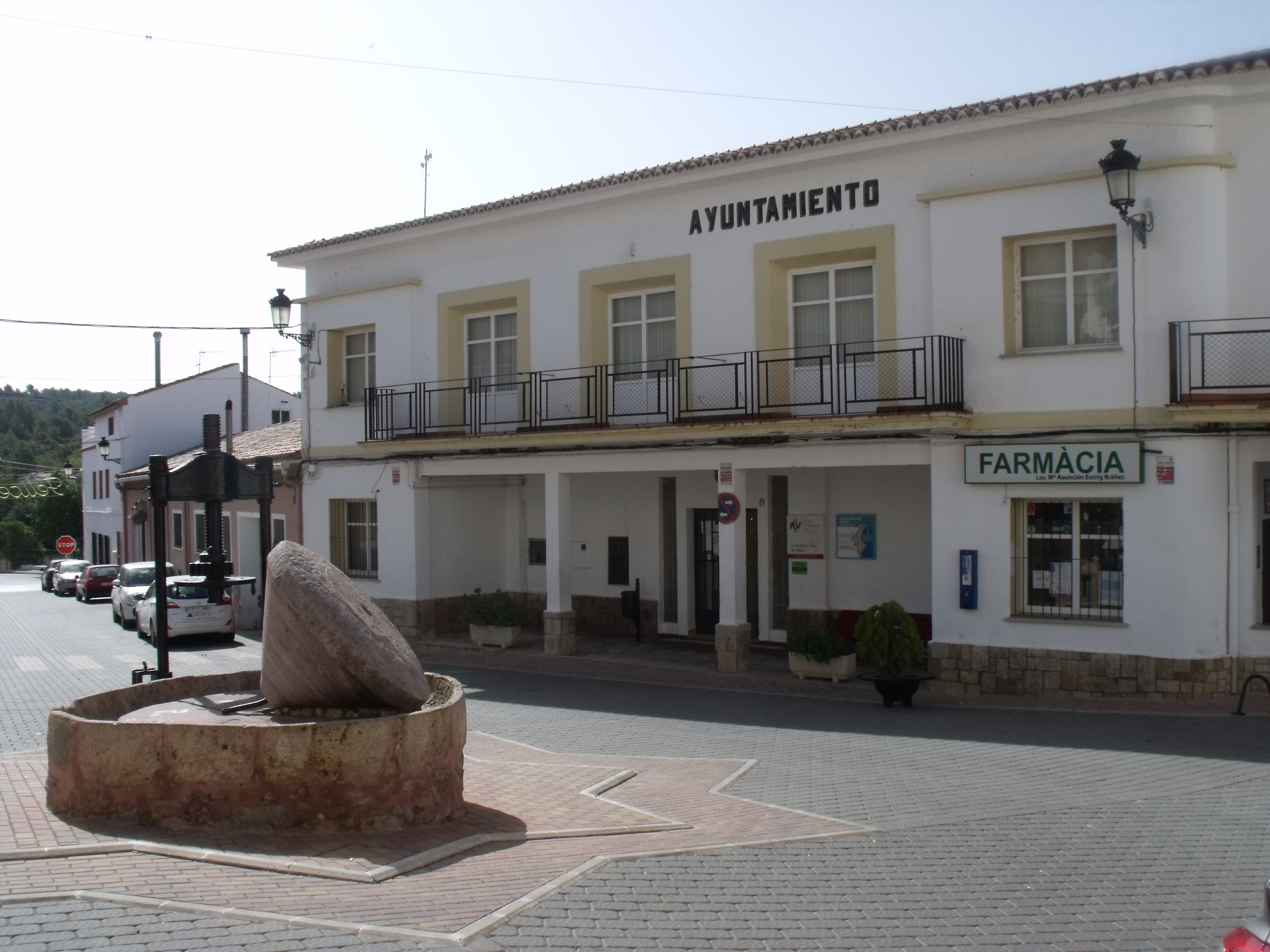
- View of Matet.

- Flag Coat of arms

- Location of Matet. Matet (Valencian Community)
- Coordinates: 39°56′N 0°28′W
- Country: Spain
- Community: Valencia
- Province: Castellón
- Comarca: Alto Palancia

Government
  - Mayor: Rosa María Guillermo Tortajada (PP)

Area
  - Total: 14.89 km^{2} (5.75 sq mi)

Population (2023)
  - Total: 84
  - Density: 5.6/km^{2} (15/sq mi)
- Time zone: UTC+1 (CET)
  - Summer (DST): UTC+2 (CEST)
- Postal code: 12415
- Website: www.matet.es

Matet is a municipality in the comarca of Alto Palancia, Castellón, Valencia, Spain.
