= Castellnovo =

- Municipality
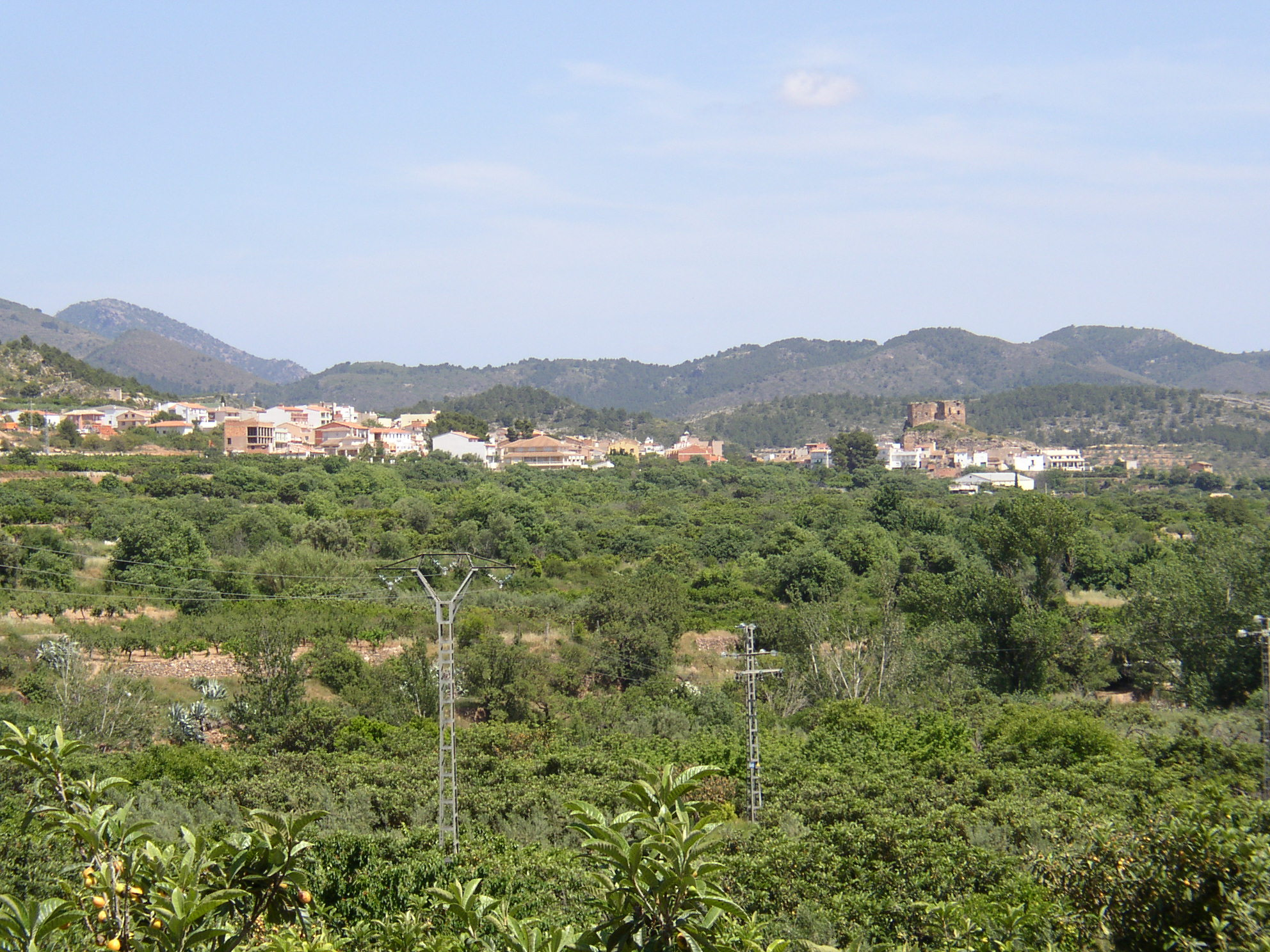
- View of Castellnovo.

- Flag Coat of arms

- Location of Castellnovo. Castellnovo (Valencian Community)
- Coordinates: 39°52′N 0°27′W
- Country: Spain
- Community: Valencia
- Province: Castellón
- Comarca: Alto Palancia

Government
  - Mayor: Antonio López Gil (PSPV-PSOE)

Area
  - Total: 19.20 km^{2} (7.41 sq mi)

Population (2023)
  - Total: 888
  - Density: 46.2/km^{2} (120/sq mi)
- Time zone: UTC+1 (CET)
  - Summer (DST): UTC+2 (CEST)
- Postal code: 12413
- Website: www.castellnovo.es

Castellnovo is a municipality in the comarca of Alto Palancia, Castellón, Valencia, Spain.
