= Azuébar =

- Municipality
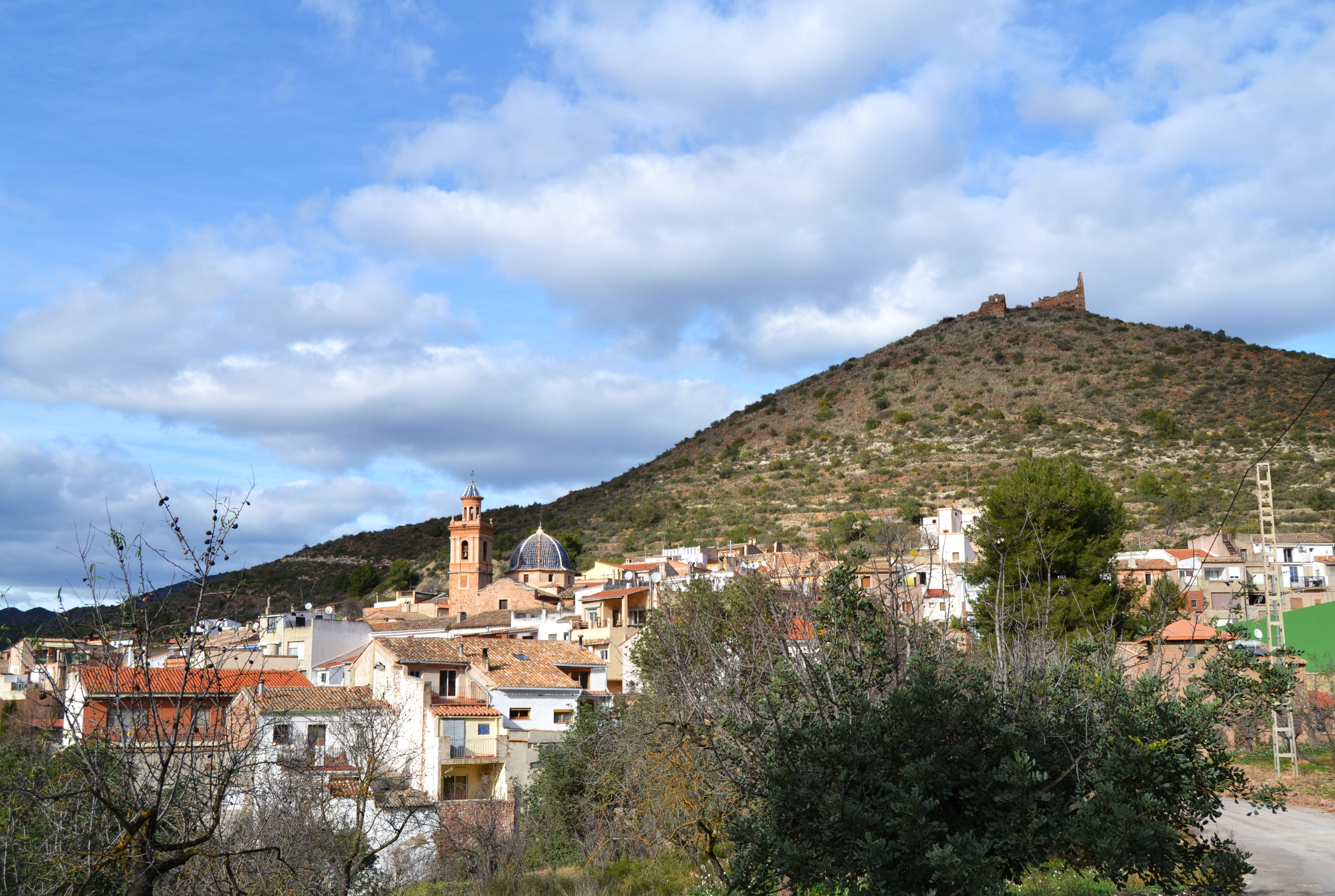
- View of Azuébar.

- Coat of arms

- Location of Azuébar. Azuébar (Valencian Community)
- Coordinates: 39°50′N 0°22′W
- Country: Spain
- Community: Valencia
- Province: Castellón
- Comarca: Alto Palancia

Government
  - Mayor: Jéssica Miravete Bernat (PP)

Area
  - Total: 23.40 km^{2} (9.03 sq mi)

Population (2023)
  - Total: 336
  - Density: 14.4/km^{2} (37.2/sq mi)
- Time zone: UTC+1 (CET)
  - Summer (DST): UTC+2 (CEST)
- Postal code: 12490
- Website: www.azuebar.es

Azuébar is a municipality in the comarca of Alto Palancia, Castellón, Valencia, Spain.

== See also ==
- List of municipalities in Castellón
