= Alto Palancia =

Coordinates: 39°51′12″N 0°29′06″W

Alto Palancia Alt Palància
- Comarca
- Country: Spain
- Autonomous community: Valencian Community
- Province: Castelló / Castellón
- Capital and largest city: Segorbe
- Municipalities: 27 municipalities: Algimia de Almonacid, Almedíjar, Altura, Azuébar, Barracas, Bejís, Benafer, Castellnovo, Caudiel, Chóvar, Gaibiel, Geldo, Higueras, Jérica, Matet, Navajas, Pavías, Pina de Montalgrao, Sacañet, Segorbe, Soneja, Sot de Ferrer, Teresa, Torás, El Toro, Vall de Almonacid, Viver

Area
  - Total: 965.15 km^{2} (372.65 sq mi)

Population (2019)
  - Total: 23,753
  - Density: 24.611/km^{2} (63.741/sq mi)
- Time zone: UTC+1 (CET)
  - Summer (DST): UTC+2 (CEST)

Alto Palancia (Spanish: [ˈalto paˈlanθja]; Valencian: Alt Palància [ˈalt paˈlansia]) is a comarca in the province of Castellón, Valencian Community (Spain). It is part of the Spanish-speaking area in the Valencian Community.

== Municipalities ==
The comarca is composed of 27 municipalities, listed below with their populations at the 2001 and 2011 Censuses, and according to the most recent official estimates (for 1 January 2019):

| Name | Population (2001) | Population (2011) | Population (2019) |
|---|---|---|---|
| Algimia de Almonacid | 299 | 296 | 263 |
| Almedíjar | 270 | 302 | 254 |
| Altura | 3,140 | 3,784 | 3,528 |
| Azuébar | 327 | 362 | 315 |
| Barracas | 164 | 199 | 162 |
| Bejís | 370 | 418 | 380 |
| Benafer | 150 | 177 | 152 |
| Castellnovo | 1,026 | 1,045 | 917 |
| Caudiel | 704 | 736 | 664 |
| Chóvar | 369 | 355 | 288 |
| Gaibiel | 200 | 195 | 188 |
| Geldo | 703 | 690 | 635 |
| Higueras | 47 | 58 | 54 |
| Jérica | 1,561 | 1,653 | 1,548 |
| Matet | 125 | 106 | 84 |
| Navajas | 564 | 828 | 716 |
| Pavías | 59 | 61 | 61 |
| Pina de Montalgrao | 157 | 140 | 111 |
| Sacañet | 84 | 77 | 67 |
| Segorbe | 8,023 | 9,198 | 8,978 |
| Soneja | 1,383 | 1,515 | 1,447 |
| Sot de Ferrer | 407 | 442 | 415 |
| Teresa | 317 | 277 | 242 |
| Torás | 238 | 259 | 223 |
| El Toro | 291 | 283 | 256 |
| Vall de Almonacid | 279 | 267 | 269 |
| Viver | 1,307 | 1,627 | 1,536 |
| Totals | 22,564 | 25,350 | 23,753 |

Municipalities of Alto Palancia
