= Sot de Ferrer =

- Municipality
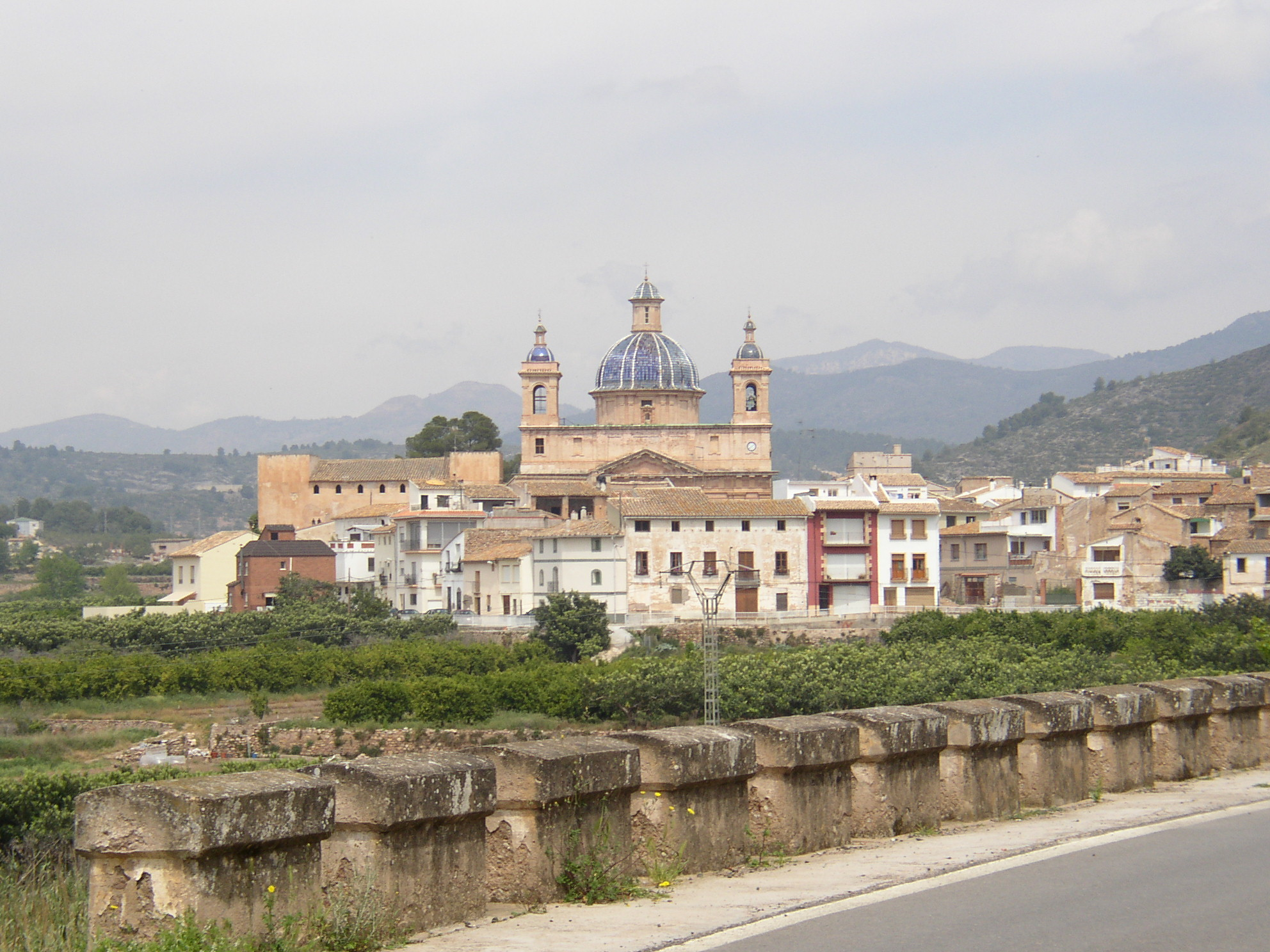
- Church and palace of Sot de Ferrer.

- Coat of arms

- Location of Sot de Ferrer. Sot de Ferrer (Valencian Community)
- Coordinates: 39°48′N 0°24′W
- Country: Spain
- Community: Valencia
- Province: Castellón
- Comarca: Alto Palancia

Government
  - Mayor: Ramón Martínez (PSOE)

Area
  - Total: 8.63 km^{2} (3.33 sq mi)

Population (2023)
  - Total: 474
  - Density: 54.9/km^{2} (142/sq mi)
- Time zone: UTC+1 (CET)
  - Summer (DST): UTC+2 (CEST)
- Postal code: 12489
- Website: www.sotdeferrer.es

Sot de Ferrer is a municipality in the comarca of Alto Palancia, Castellón, Valencia, Spain.
