= Baltasar Calvo =

Spanish canon and rebel (c. 1768–1808)

- Born: 1768; Jérica
- Died: 3 July 1808 (aged 39–40)
- Cause of death: Execution
- Occupation: Canon
- Known for: Massacre of French civilians

Baltasar Calvo (c. 1768 – 3 July 1808) was a Spanish canon and rebel. He was executed by rebel authorities on 3 July 1808 for organizing a massacre of French civilians and leading an attempted insurrection in Valencia during the French occupation of Spain in the Napoleonic Wars.

== Biography ==
=== Situation pre-massacre ===
The British Royal Military Chronicle wrote of Calvo that "he was ambitious, bold, subtle, and sanguinary. His person corresponded with his mind. His features, being ravaged by disease, were large, dark, and fierce; and his frame athletic and powerful."

Born in Jérica, Province of Castellón, Calvo was a canon from the Collegiate Church of San Isidro, Madrid, known for his conservative and anti-liberal views. Calvo was a noted critic of the French Revolution. After the Napoleonic invasion and conquest of Spain in 1808, French General Joachim Murat sent the clergyman to Valencia to quell the uprising there against French rule. After arriving in Valencia on 1 June, however, Calvo revealed his true goals: to seize control of the city and province for himself.

A large French minority lived in Valencia, largely dominant in the trade industries. Due to their foreign origins they were viewed with suspicion by other Valencians, and they took refuge in the city's citadel in fear of being attacked. Calvo denounced the French Valencians as a fifth column that were trying to help Murat take over the city. However, the French community had largely assimilated into Spanish society, and according to the Royal Military Chronicle, "were in every respect but the name Spaniards."

=== Massacre ===
An anti-French mob led by Calvo stormed the city's prison and freed a large number of convicts. Realizing that a massacre was at hand, Peter Carey Tupper, the British Consul in Valencia, sought and obtained authorisation from the Supreme Junta, the rebel authority that governed the city, to try to prevent it. He went to the citadel and offered to move the French to a group of six convents, but they refused, as they felt that their security was strong enough to protect them.

On 5 June Calvo's mob of rioters and convicts stormed the citadel at dusk, close to the modern-day Puerta del Mar Plaza, overpowering the guards. Every Frenchperson was taken to a room where they were forced to recite their confessions to a group of monks who had been forcefully escorted by Calvo to the citadel. The victims were walked out of the room and then knocked to the ground by bludgeon-wielding men and then stabbed to death by the mob. An estimated 170 people were killed in this fashion, according to the Royal Military Chronicle.

As night fell, the Supreme Junta sent friars from the convents to the citadel to try to stop the killing. The Royal Military Chronicle wrote of the scene in detail:

The assassins deserted from their work of blood, and threw themselves upon their knees. The piles of the victims[,] some still writhing in their blood and wounds; the kneeling murderers smeered [sic] with gore, the solemn music and psalmody; the horror-struck countenances of the monks, in viewing the ghastly spectacle before them, and the darkness of the night, and the effeet [sic] of the tapers, presented a scene at once horrible, awful, and sublime.

Calvo ordered the clergymen to go back or else they too would be killed, and the monks retreated. The killing went on until the mob was too exhausted to kill more.

When Calvo and his men woke up the next morning, Calvo showed his followers a fabricated letter by a Frenchman confessing of a plot to take over the city. The mob was convinced and decided that they would finish off the rest of the French population in the city. After killing 150 French civilians caught hiding inside the citadel, the rioters went to the streets knocking on doors, forcing anybody they thought was French to confess their sins and then killing them. A group of rioters entered the headquarters of the Supreme Junta holding five Frenchmen as hostages. The hostage-takers demanded that the Junta give the rioters an order to execute the hostages, the intention being that if the Junta did so the massacre would be legitimised, and if they were refused the Valencian population would view their leaders with distrust for refusing to kill the enemy. The Count of Cervelló responded that "You have killed many Frenchmen without an order, and none can now be necessary." The rioters reacted by murdering their hostages and leaving their bodies on the doorsteps. One of the rioters attacked Peter Carey Tupper thinking that he was French, but was stopped by another rioter who realized that the consul was from Britain.

The Supreme Junta recognised that Calvo was trying to lead a coup d'état against it. Calvo had already announced his intention to dismantle the Junta as well as seize control of Valencia, and reportedly planned to kill the archbishop. Franciscan friar Father Rico, a member of the Junta, proposed inviting Calvo to hold negotiations, an offer he accepted. At the end of the meeting, however, Father Rico stood up and denounced Calvo as a traitor. He was arrested and sent to Mallorca so he could not be freed by his Valencian supporters.

The massacre lasted from 5 to 6 June, and Calvo was captured on 7 June. In total some four hundred French men, women, and children were massacred by Calvo and his followers. Excavations in 1996 found the corpses of 173 people at Santa Rita Street; the fashion they were found in indicated that they had been stripped and in some cases had their hands and feet tied before they were killed, and many had been decapitated and stabbed. The bodies had not yet been dated by 2011.

=== Imprisonment and execution ===
Baltasar Calvo was imprisoned in Palma de Mallorca. On 3 July 1808, he was declared guilty by the courts of murder and high treason against the Spanish state. He was executed using a garrote inside the Valencia Prison at 12:00. The next day his corpse was left on the Plaza de Santo Domingo, in front of the citadel with the inscription Por traidor a la Patria y mandante vil de asesinos (For the traitor to the fatherland and vile instigator of murderers). He was about forty years old.

Hundreds of rioters who had taken part in his insurrection were also executed, and the man who tried to kill Tupper reportedly had his hand nailed on a wall. Peter Carey Tupper was awarded the title of "Baron Socorro" for hiding French civilians from Calvo's followers and trying to stop the massacre.

== Legacy ==
Calvo has been denounced as a "Valencian Robespierre."

The story of Baltasar Calvo and the massacre of the French residents of Valencia has been overlooked, according to some writers, in favour of narratives portraying the Spanish cause in a less guilty light. Spanish historian Jesus Maroto de las Heras noted that the 1808 Battle of Valencia, in which Spanish forces defeated French General Moncey, is rarely noted in the context of the massacre of hundreds of unarmed French people a few weeks before. According to Las Provincias, "If the descriptions that Vicente Boix and Teodoro Llorente left about the fervent popular exaltation of the Valencians inflamed by the patriotism of Vicent Domenech in the Market are still moving, the chilling account that both Valencian historians made of that massacre of French families is also embarrassing and overwhelmed."
