= Almedíjar =

- Municipality
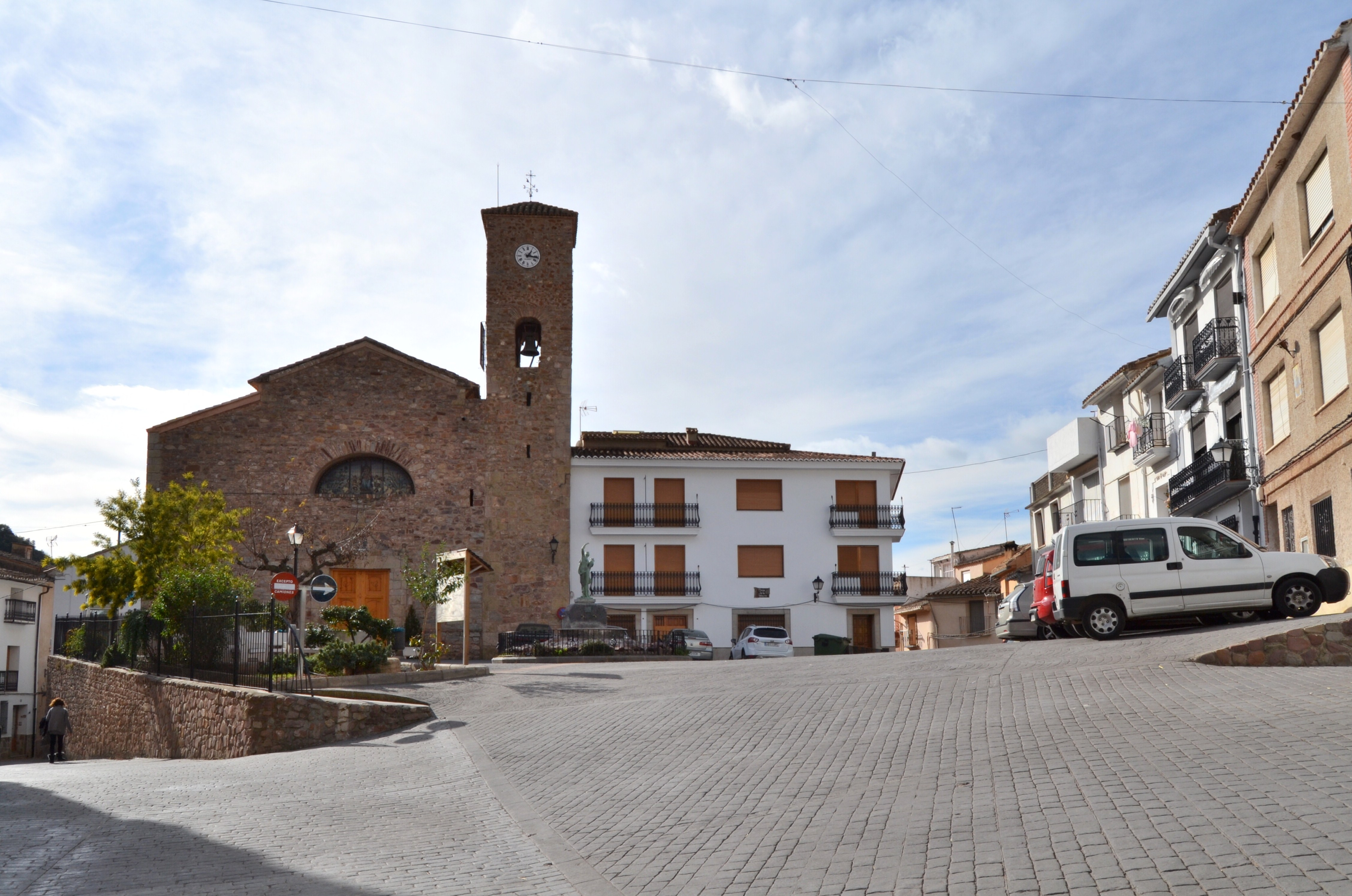
- Almedíjar church square.

- Flag Coat of arms

- Location of Almedíjar. Almedíjar (Valencian Community)
- Coordinates: 39°52′19″N 0°24′35″W
- Country: Spain
- Community: Valencia
- Province: Castellón
- Comarca: Alto Palancia

Government
  - Mayor: José Esteban Villanova Pérez (PSOE)

Area
  - Total: 20.90 km^{2} (8.07 sq mi)

Population (2023)
  - Total: 280
  - Density: 13/km^{2} (35/sq mi)
- Demonym: Almedijano/a
- Time zone: UTC+1 (CET)
  - Summer (DST): UTC+2 (CEST)
- Postal code: 12413
- Website: almedijar.es

Almedíjar is a municipality in the comarca of Alto Palancia, Castellón, Valencia, Spain.

== See also ==
- List of municipalities in Castellón
