= Pedro Miralles =

Architect and designer (b. 1955, d. 1993)

- Born: Pedro Miralles Claver; August 26, 1955; Valencia, Valencian Community, Spain
- Died: August 30, 1993 (aged 38); Valencia, Valencian Community, Spain
- Known for: Industrial and architectural design

Pedro Miralles Claver (26 August 1955 - 30 August 1993) was a Spanish industrial designer and architect. He was one of Spain's leading designers in the latter half of the 20th century.

An architecture graduate, his studies started in Valencia and finished in Madrid. He knew people linked with the postmodernist movement in Spain in the capital: the architect Rafael Moneo, his university teacher, and some of the representatives of the Movida Madrileña, such as the film director Pedro Almodóvar and the fashion designer Jesús del Pozo. A year later, he did his first individual furniture exhibition in Valencia.

As an industrial designer, in 1987 he did his Master's at Milan's prestigious Domus Academy. Since then, he worked for many Spanish, French and Italian businesses. His most famous works include La silla de Hakernar ("Hakernar's Chair", 1987); Sillas Andrews Sisters ("Andrews Sisters' Chairs", 1988); Silla de Lyns ("Lyns' Chair", 1989); Lámpara líquida ("Liquid Lamp", 1991); Silla de arabescos ("The Arabesques' Chair", 1992).
