= Algimia de Almonacid =

- Municipality
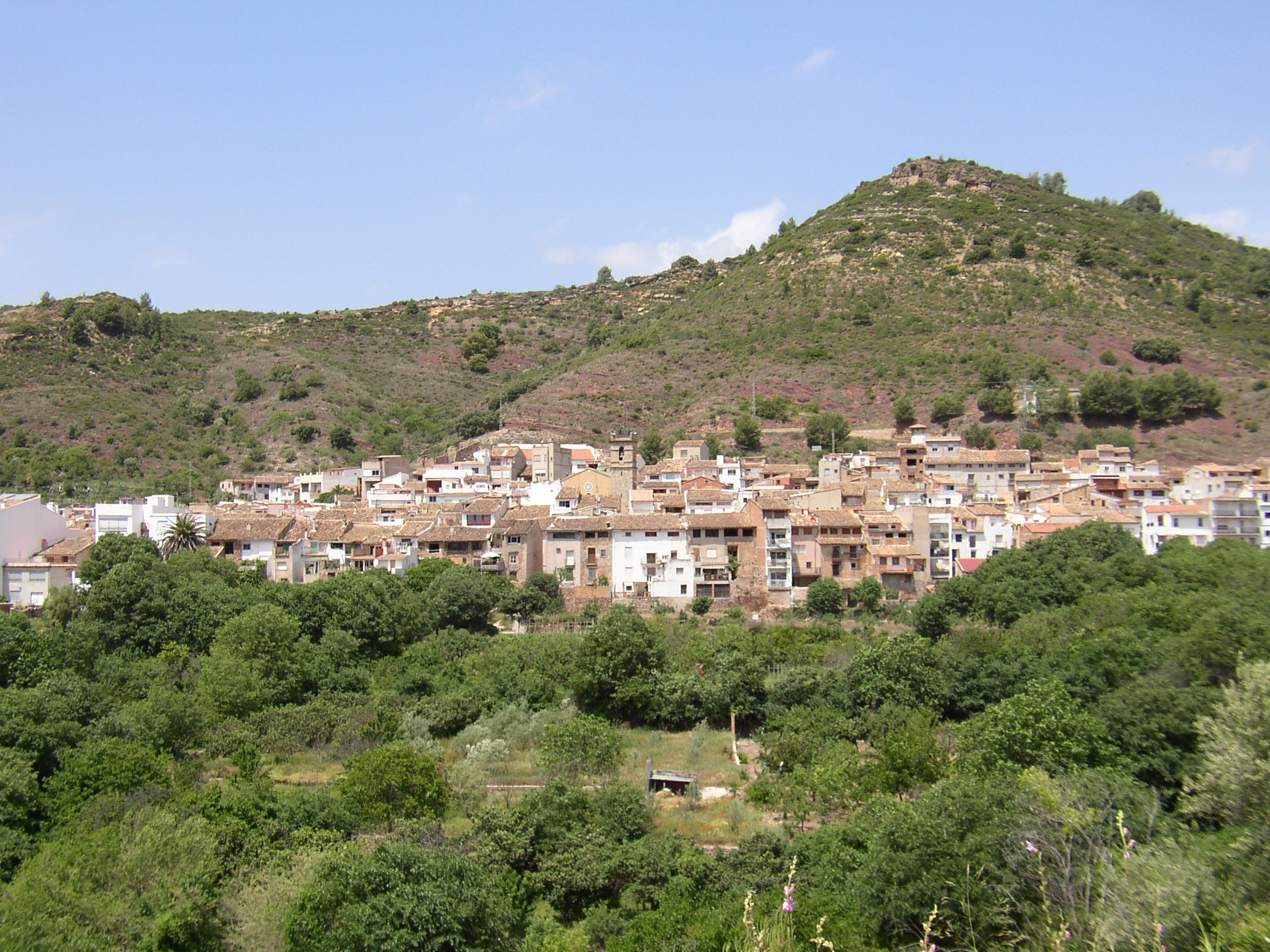
- View of Algimia de Almonacid.

- Flag Coat of arms

- Location of Algimia de Almonacid. Algimia de Almonacid (Valencian Community)
- Coordinates: 39°55′N 0°26′W
- Country: Spain
- Community: Valencia
- Province: Castellón
- Comarca: Alto Palancia

Government
  - Mayor: Jaime Santiago Pertegaz (PP)

Area
  - Total: 20.33 km^{2} (7.85 sq mi)

Population (2023)
  - Total: 249
  - Density: 12.2/km^{2} (31.7/sq mi)
- Time zone: UTC+1 (CET)
  - Summer (DST): UTC+2 (CEST)
- Postal code: 12414
- Website: algimiadealmonacid.es

Algimia de Almonacid is a municipality in the comarca of Alto Palancia, Castellón, Valencia, Spain.

== See also ==
- List of municipalities in Castellón
