= Bejís =

- Municipality
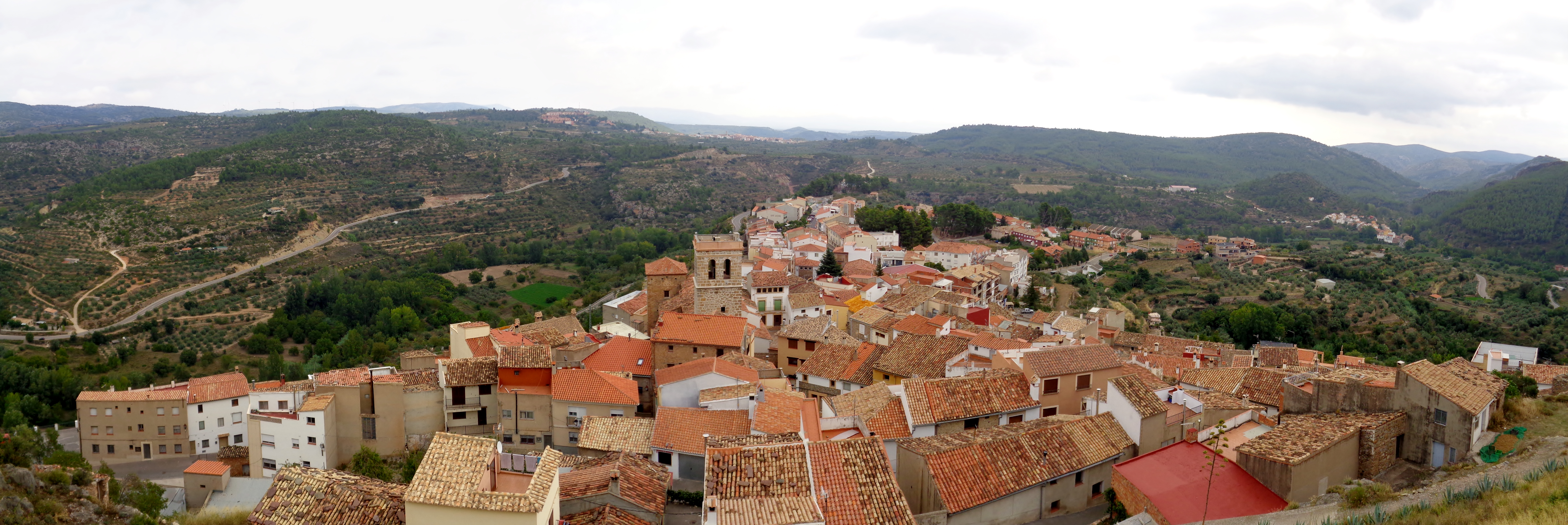

- Coat of arms
- Interactive map of Bejís
- Coordinates: 39°54′34″N 0°42′33″W
- Country: Spain
- Autonomous community: Comunidad Valenciana
- Province: Castellón
- Comarca: Alto Palancia

Government
  - Mayor: Herminia Palomar Pérez

Area
  - Total: 42.40 km^{2} (16.37 sq mi)
- Elevation: 799 m (2,621 ft)

Population (2025-01-01)
  - Total: 400
  - Density: 9.4/km^{2} (24/sq mi)
- Demonym: Bejiseros
- Time zone: UTC+1 (CET)
  - Summer (DST): UTC+2 (CEST)
- Postal code: 12430
- Website: Official website

Bejís (Aragonese: Beixix) is a municipality in the comarca of Alto Palancia, province of Castellón, Valencian Community, Spain.

== Notable people ==
- Antonio Ponz (1725–1792), painter

== See also ==
- List of municipalities in Castellón
