= Navajas =

Municipality in Valencia, Spain

Coordinates: 39°53′N 0°30′W

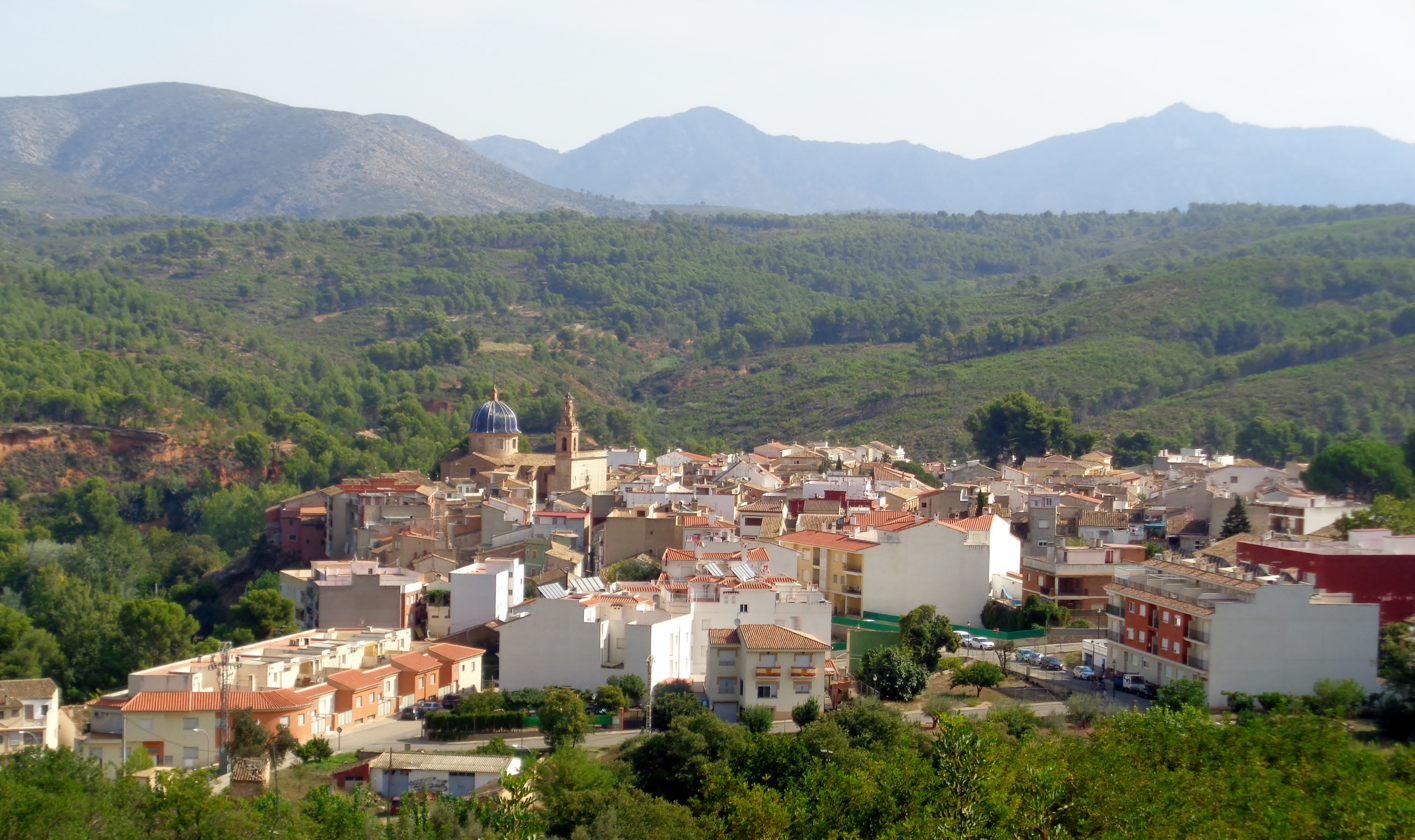
Navajas, View from the Greenway

Navajas's flag

Navajas's coat of arms

Navajas is a municipality in the comarca of Alto Palancia, Castellón, Valencia, Spain. It is located in the mountains, and a river runs through toward Salto de la Novia. The most famous tourist attraction of Navajas is the surrounding countryside area, in particular a spectacular 60-meter waterfall, which waters flow into the river called Salto de la Novia or the Bride's Jump.
