= Sacañet =

- Municipality
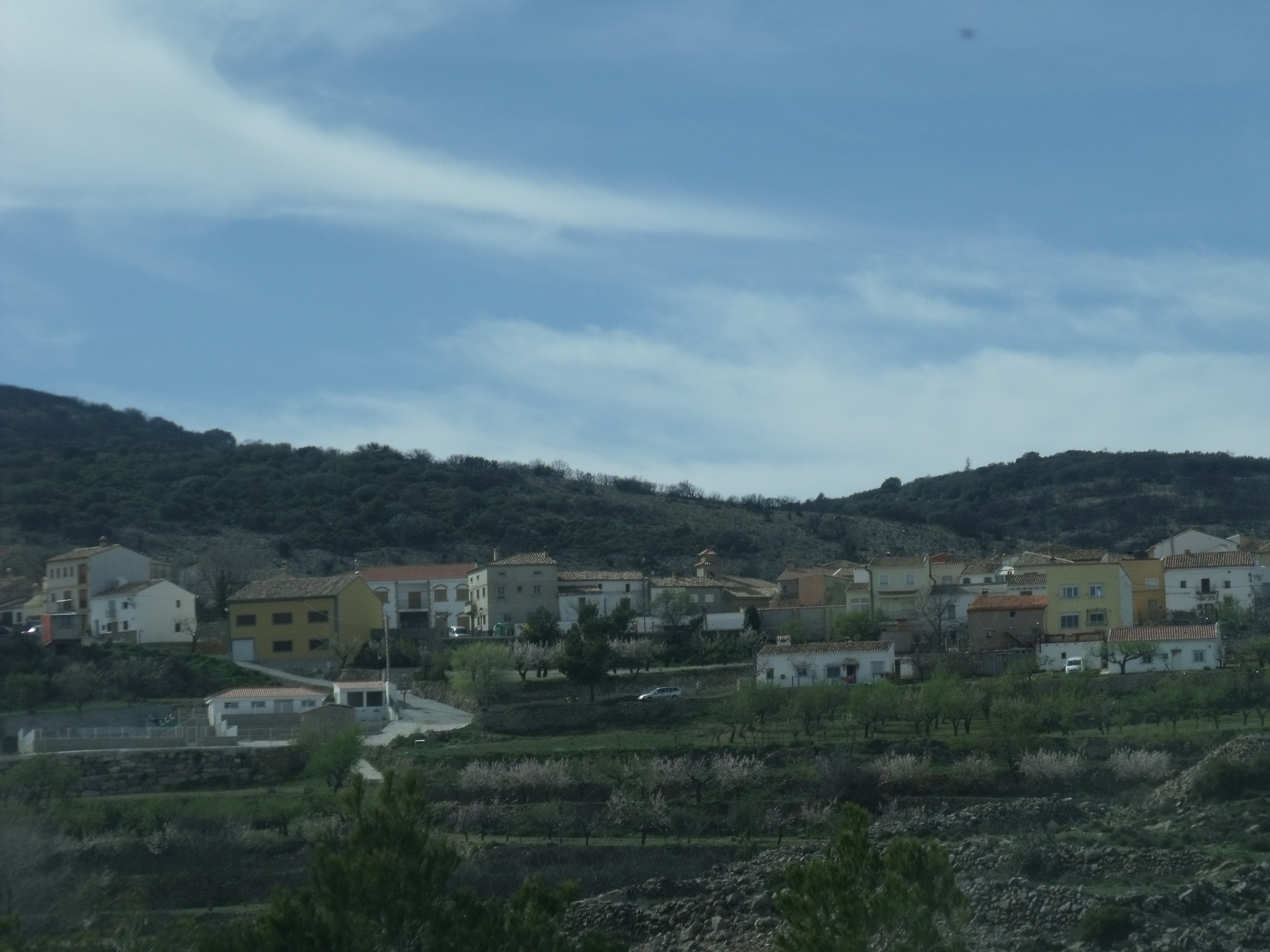
- Partial View of Sacañet.

- Flag Coat of arms

- Location of Sacañet. Sacañet (Valencian Community)
- Coordinates: 39°52′N 0°43′W
- Country: Spain
- Community: Valencia
- Province: Castellón
- Comarca: Alto Palancia

Government
  - Mayor: Roberto Gil (PP)

Area
  - Total: 30.50 km^{2} (11.78 sq mi)

Population (2023)
  - Total: 86
  - Density: 2.8/km^{2} (7.3/sq mi)
- Time zone: UTC+1 (CET)
  - Summer (DST): UTC+2 (CEST)
- Postal code: 12469
- Website: www.sacanet.es

Sacañet is a municipality in the comarca of Alto Palancia, Castellón, Valencia, Spain.
