= Torás =

- Municipality
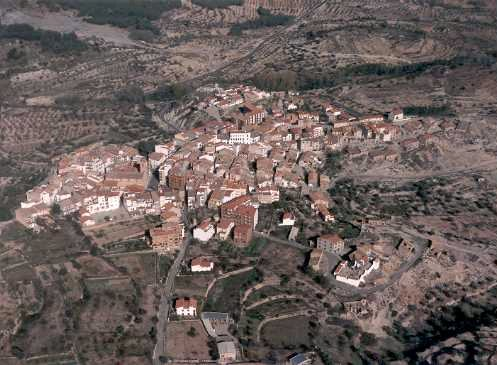
- View of Torás.

- Coat of arms

- Location of Torás. Torás (Valencian Community)
- Coordinates: 39.917°N 0.683°W
- Country: Spain
- Community: Valencia
- Province: Castellón
- Comarca: Alto Palancia

Government
  - Mayor: Carlos del Río Díaz

Area
  - Total: 16.78 km^{2} (6.48 sq mi)

Population (2023)
  - Total: 256
  - Density: 15.3/km^{2} (39.5/sq mi)
- Demonym: Torasero/a
- Time zone: UTC+1 (CET)
  - Summer (DST): UTC+2 (CEST)
- Postal code: 12431
- Website: www.toras.es

Torás is a municipality in the comarca of Alto Palancia, Castellón, Valencia, Spain.
