= San Agustín, Teruel =

San Agustín, Spain
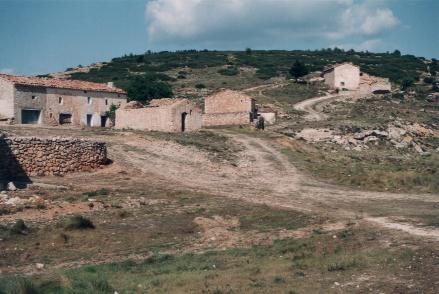

- Location within Spain
- Coordinates: 40.059°N 0.693°W
- Country: Spain
- Autonomous community: Aragon
- Province: Teruel
- Municipality: San Agustín

Area
  - Total: 56.34 km^{2} (21.75 sq mi)

Population (2025-01-01)
  - Total: 132
  - Density: 2.34/km^{2} (6.07/sq mi)
- Time zone: UTC+1 (CET)
  - Summer (DST): UTC+2 (CEST)

San Agustín is a municipality located in the province of Teruel, Aragon, Spain. It lies just east of the Autovía A-23 60 km south east of the town of Teruel and 70 km north west of Sagunt. According to the National Institute of Statistics, the municipality had a population of 155 inhabitants in 2013.

In literature, San Augustin is mentioned by James A. Michener in his book, Iberia. As a young man, Michener had landed at Burriana as a part of a ship's crew and taken the train to Teruel. Re-visiting the area in the 1960s, Michener found only small improvements in the standard of living.

Nor had the village changed.The central square was still unpaved; most of the houses were still unpainted; the dust was omnipresent and the heat kept people indoors. The meanness of life continued too: the earthen floors, the sparse furniture, the inadequate clothing, the harsh poverty of Spanish rural life.

Of all the countries in which I have travelled, only India and Turkey have had rural poverty as grinding as that in Spain and the much publicized Twenty-Five years of Peace have brought little to the farmers. Yet, even as I thought this I became aware of the improvement. I could see electricity wires which had not been there a generation before; in what once had been barren fields I could see where millions of young trees had been planted, as they have been throughout Spain. The roads were better and the village even had an automobile and two television aerials.

== See also ==
- List of municipalities in Teruel
