= Almonacid de Zorita =

Almonacid de Zorita, Spain
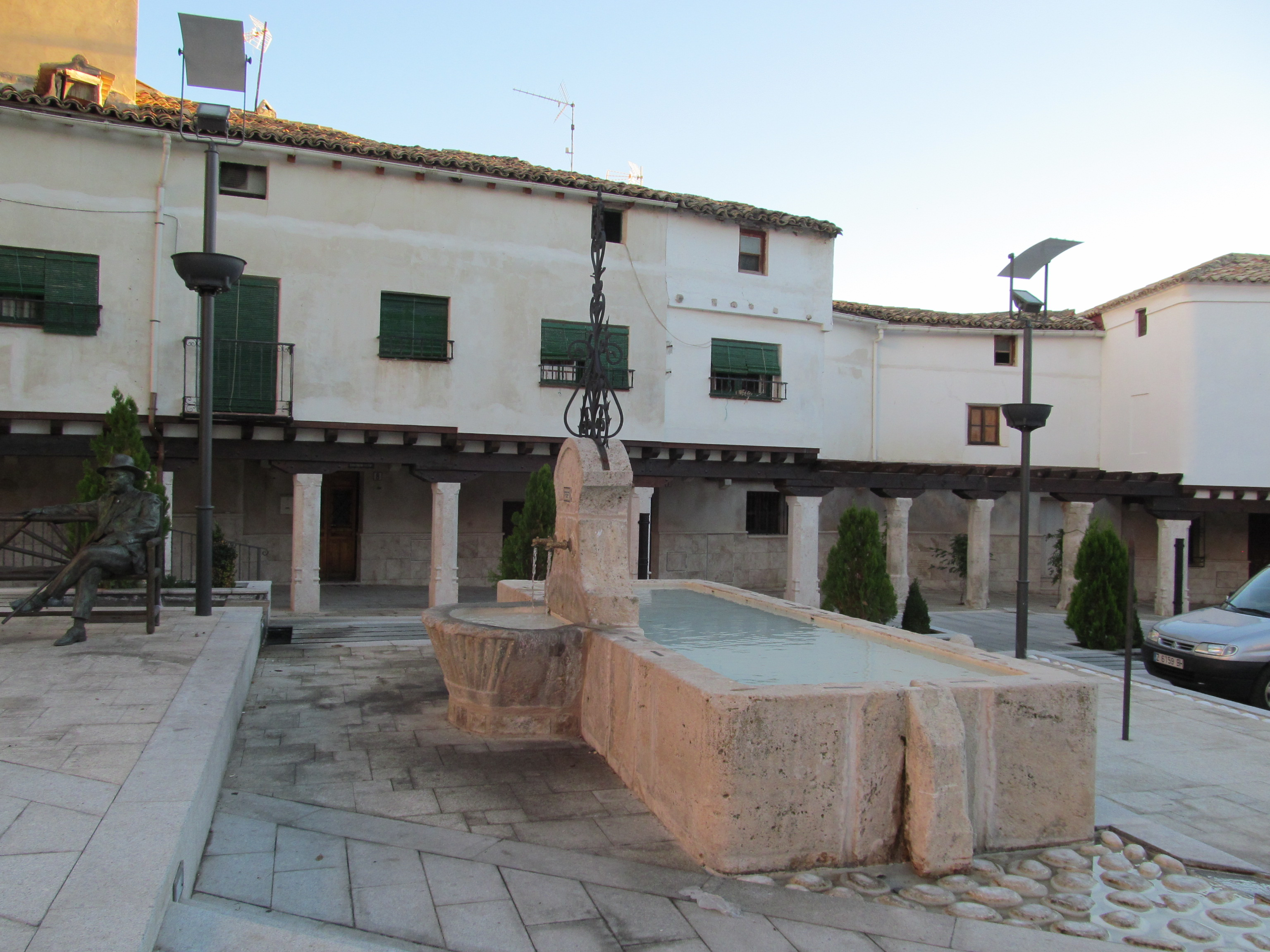

- Flag Coat of arms

- Location within Province of Guadalajara Location within Castilla-La Mancha Location within Spain
- Coordinates: 40°19′44″N 2°50′54″W
- Country: Spain
- Autonomous community: Castile-La Mancha
- Province: Guadalajara
- Municipality: Almonacid de Zorita

Government
  - Mayor: Elena Gordón Altares, 2015

Area
  - Total: 44 km^{2} (17 sq mi)

Population (2025-01-01)
  - Total: 667
  - Density: 15/km^{2} (39/sq mi)
- Time zone: UTC+1 (CET)
  - Summer (DST): UTC+2 (CEST)

Almonacid de Zorita is a municipality located in the province of Guadalajara, Castile-La Mancha, Spain. According to the 2013 census (INE), the municipality has a population of 776 inhabitants.
