= Pina de Montalgrao =

Pina
- Municipality
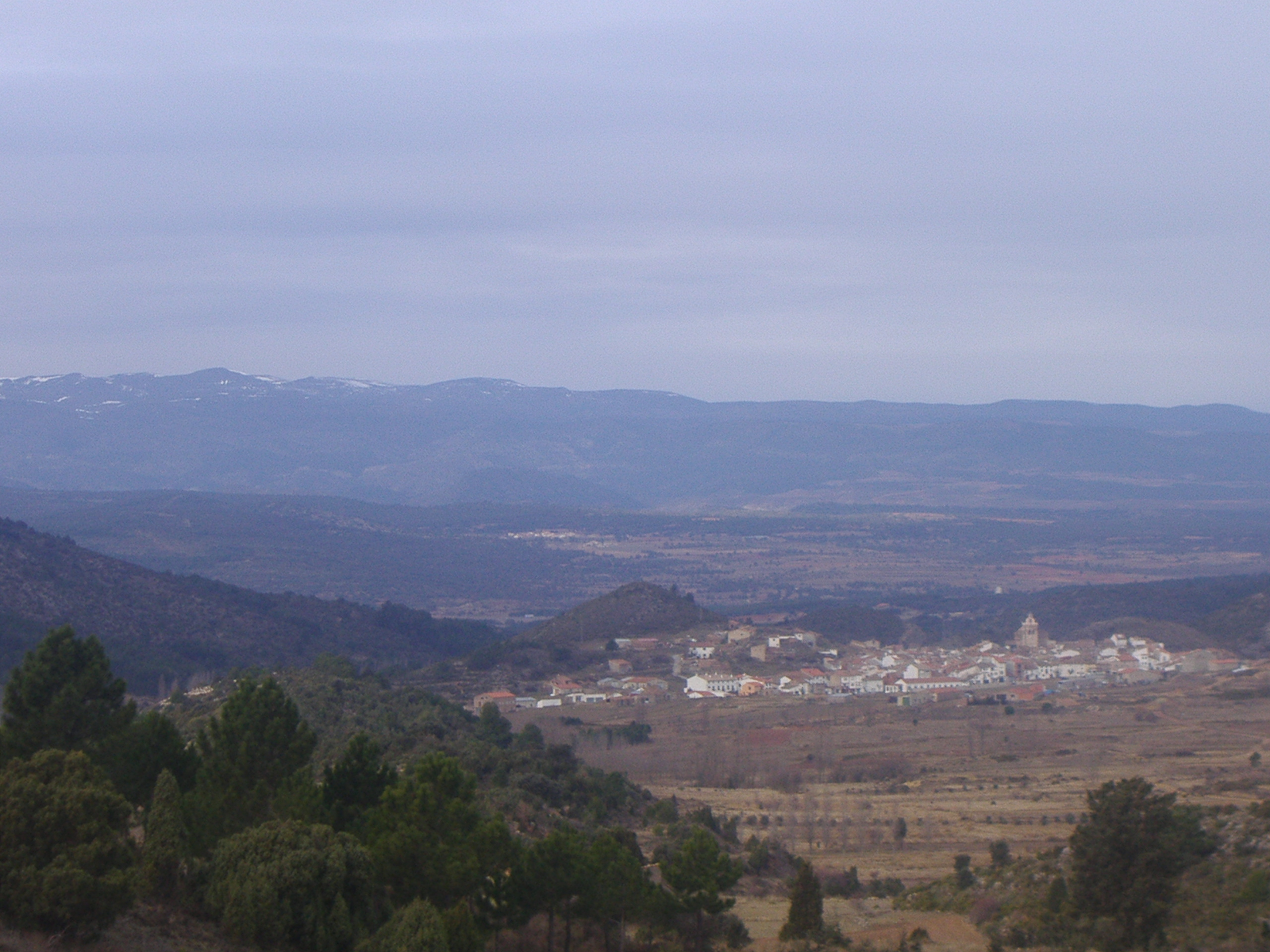
- Sierra de Javalambre rising above Pina

- Flag Coat of arms

- Location within Spain
- Coordinates: 40°01′N 0°39′W
- Country: Spain
- Community: Valencia
- Province: Castellón
- Comarca: Alto Palancia

Area
  - Total: 31.6 km^{2} (12.2 sq mi)
- Elevation: 1,039 m (3,409 ft)

Population (2025-01-01)
  - Total: 121
  - Density: 3.83/km^{2} (9.92/sq mi)
- Time zone: UTC+1 (CET)
  - Summer (DST): UTC+2 (CEST)
- Postal code: 12429

Pina de Montalgrao, or simply Pina, is a municipality in the comarca of Alto Palancia, Castellón, Valencia, Spain. According to the 2010 census the municipality has a population of 148 inhabitants.

This town is located in the mountainous Sistema Ibérico area.

== Notable people ==
- Bertolí, former footballer

== See also ==
- Sierra de Javalambre
- Alto Palancia
