= Gaibiel =

Coordinates: 39°56′N 0°29′W

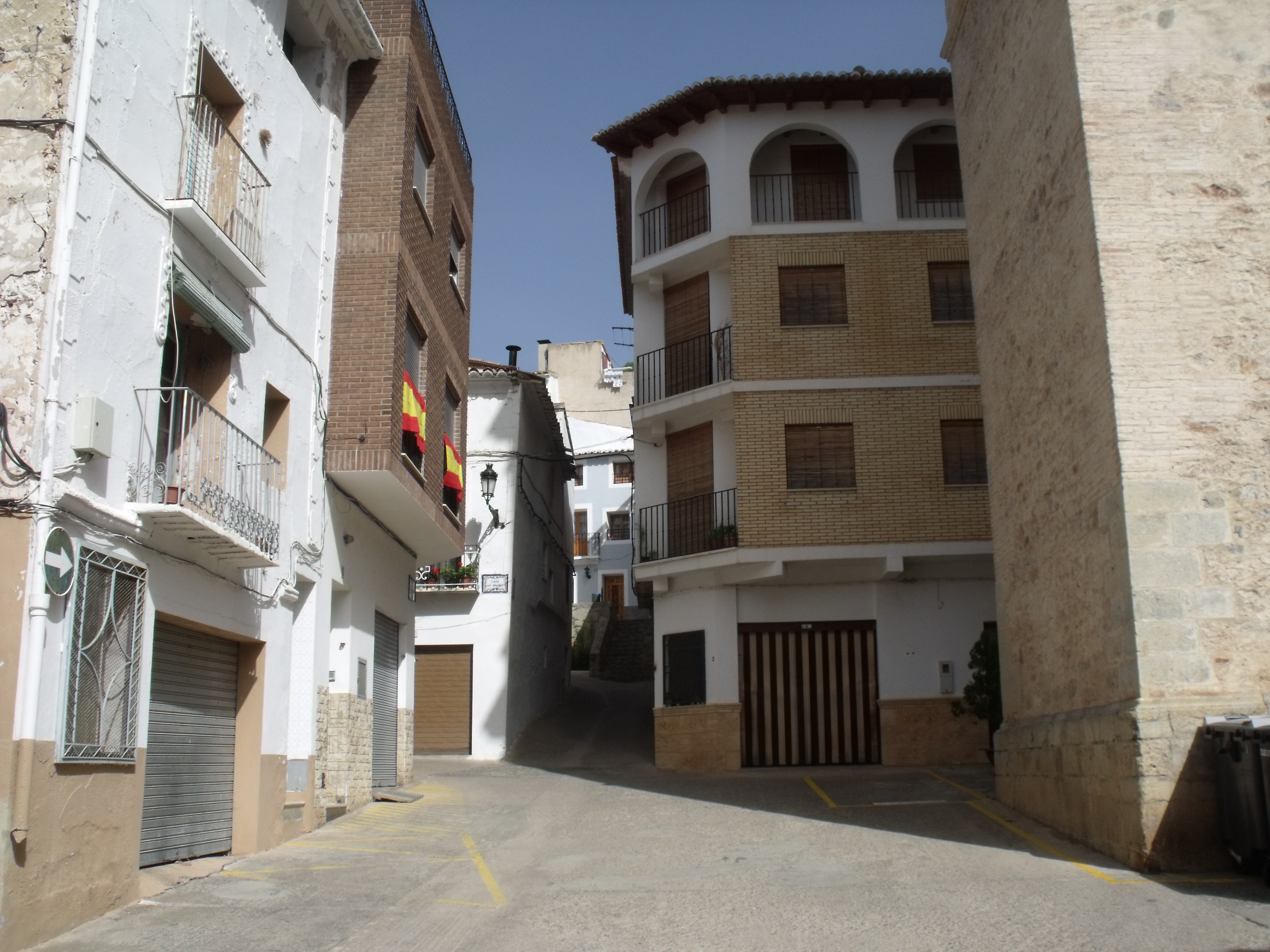
Street of Gaibiel

Gaibiel's flag

Gaibiel's coat of arms

Gaibiel is a municipality in the comarca of Alto Palancia, Castellón, Valencia, Spain.
