= Altura, Spain =

Altura
- Municipality
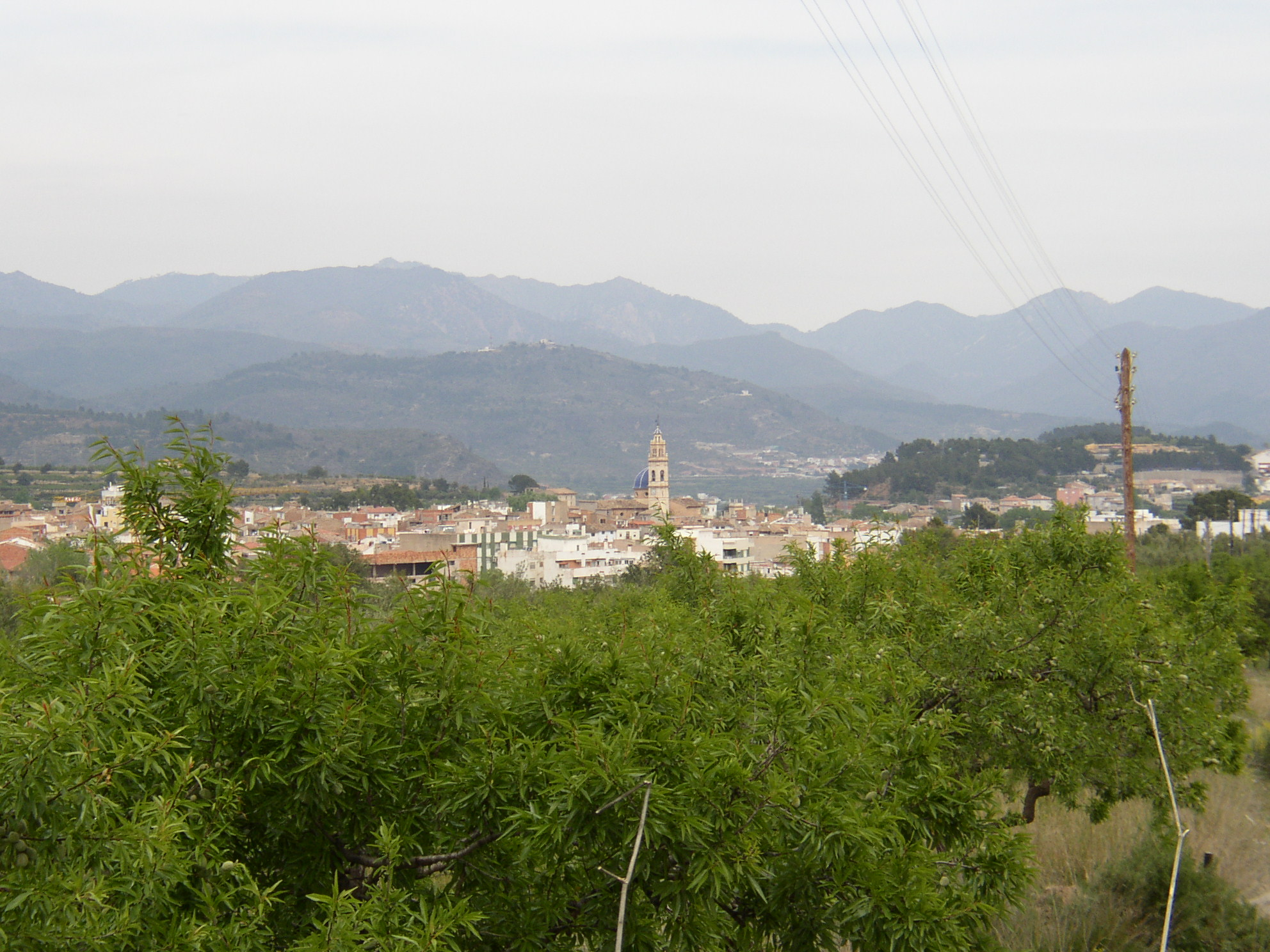
- View of Altura

- Flag Coat of arms

- Location of Altura. Altura (Valencian Community)
- Coordinates: 39°52′N 0°24′W
- Country: Spain
- Community: Valencia
- Province: Castellón
- Comarca: Alto Palancia

Government
  - Mayor: Rocío Ibáñez Candelera (PSPV-PSOE)

Area
  - Total: 129.47 km^{2} (49.99 sq mi)

Population (2023)
  - Total: 3,695
  - Density: 28.54/km^{2} (73.92/sq mi)
- Demonym: Alturano/a
- Time zone: UTC+1 (CET)
  - Summer (DST): UTC+2 (CEST)
- Postal code: 12410
- Website: www.altura.es/ca

Altura is a municipality in the comarca of Alto Palancia, Castellón, Valencia, Spain.

== See also ==
- List of municipalities in Castellón
