= Teresa, Spain =

Teresa
- Municipality
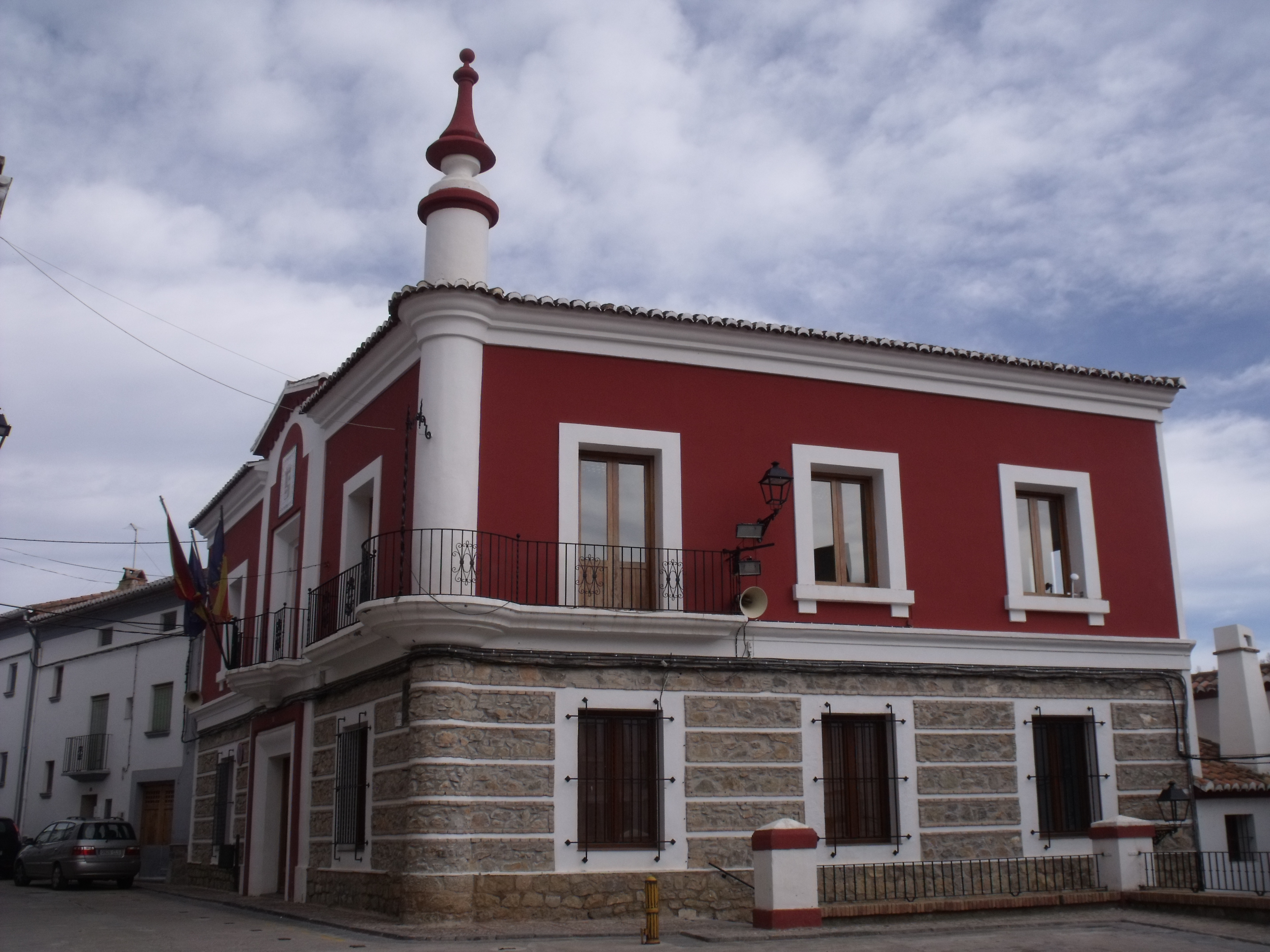
- View of Teresa.

- Coat of arms

- Location of Teresa. Teresa (Valencian Community)
- Coordinates: 39°54′02″N 0°39′33″W
- Country: Spain
- Community: Valencia
- Province: Castellón
- Comarca: Alto Palancia

Government
  - Mayor: Juan Ernesto Pérez (PSOE)

Area
  - Total: 19.89 km^{2} (7.68 sq mi)

Population (2023)
  - Total: 250
  - Density: 13/km^{2} (33/sq mi)
- Demonym: Teresano/a
- Time zone: UTC+1 (CET)
  - Summer (DST): UTC+2 (CEST)
- Postal code: 12469
- Website: www.teresa.es

Teresa is a municipality in the comarca of Alto Palancia, Castellón, Valencia, Spain.
