= Pavías =

- Municipality
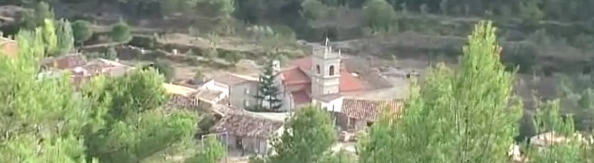
- View of Pavías.

- Flag Coat of arms

- Location of Pavías. Pavías (Valencian Community)
- Coordinates: 39°58′N 0°29′W
- Country: Spain
- Community: Valencia
- Province: Castellón
- Comarca: Alto Palancia

Government
  - Mayor: Maria Carmen Vives Pérez (PP)

Area
  - Total: 14.41 km^{2} (5.56 sq mi)

Population (2023)
  - Total: 74
  - Density: 5.1/km^{2} (13/sq mi)
- Time zone: UTC+1 (CET)
  - Summer (DST): UTC+2 (CEST)
- Postal code: 12449
- Website: pavias.es

Pavías is a municipality in the comarca of Alto Palancia, Castellón, Valencia, Spain.
