= Verbena (fair) =

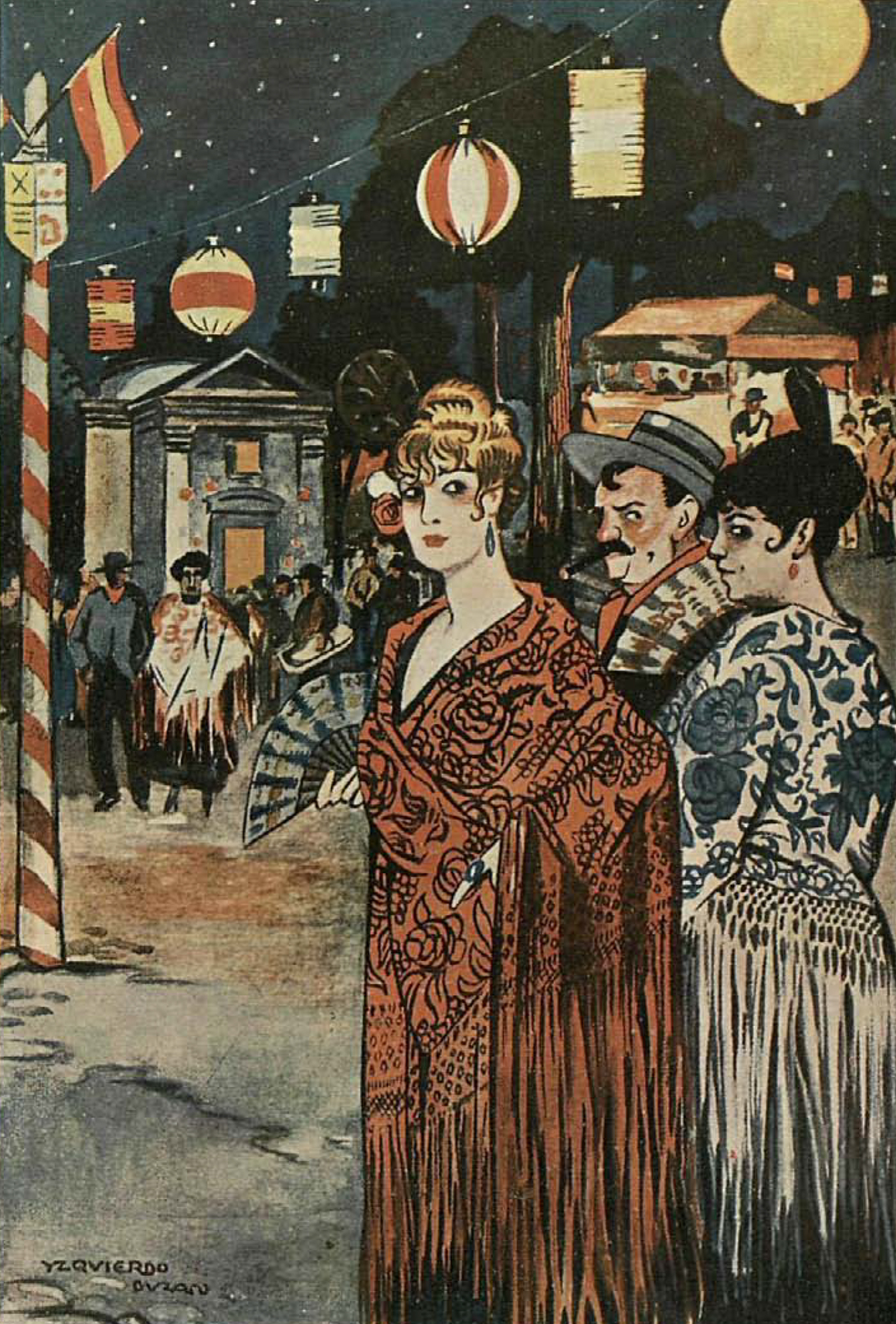
Great Life (1917) — Painted by Izquierdo Durán, this artwork illustrates the types and customs of Madrid, capturing the lively atmosphere of a Verbena night, a traditional local festival.

In Spanish-speaking cultures, a verbena is an agricultural show, modest amusement park, or dance party, especially one held at night. An old tradition, they usually take place after dark in summer. Nowadays, some major cities, such as Barcelona, host "permanent" verbenas (revetlla in Catalan); however, these have a less traditional character than those that appear for only a few days each year.

A large contemporary verbena features mechanical amusement rides, sideshow attractions, and usually some sort of gambling. Typical verbena food includes churros, ham, cheese, marzipan, candied egg yolks ("yemas"), candied quince ("membrillo"), and sugared fruits—though in recent years, modern junk foods have found their way into the mix. There are always alcoholic beverages—usually Spanish wine, sangría and lager beer.

There is usually music and dancing, either organized or spontaneously. In recent years, verbenas have incorporated recorded popular music, rock music, and even karaoke, but in Andalusia and even beyond, flamenco and other traditional music still dominate verbenas. When the musicians take a break, a runner carrying fireworks (toro de fuego) may dash into the crowd.

The word verbena comes without alteration from Latin. The term originally referred to the plant verbena, from which the term for a fair derives.

== Artistic representation ==
One of the most famous zarzuela (Spanish operetta) pieces in the género chico ("smaller genre") is La Verbena de la Paloma ("The Fair of the Dove"), set at a verbena on the night of the Virgin of the Paloma, August 14; it was also made into a 1963 movie.

There is a 1939 film called Verbena Tragica (also known as Tragic Festival).

The song "Verbena de San Cayetano" celebrates a verbena in Madrid.

== See also ==
- Patronal festival
- Sagra (festival)
