= Vall de Almonacid =

Vall de Almonacid la Vall d'Almonesir
- Municipality
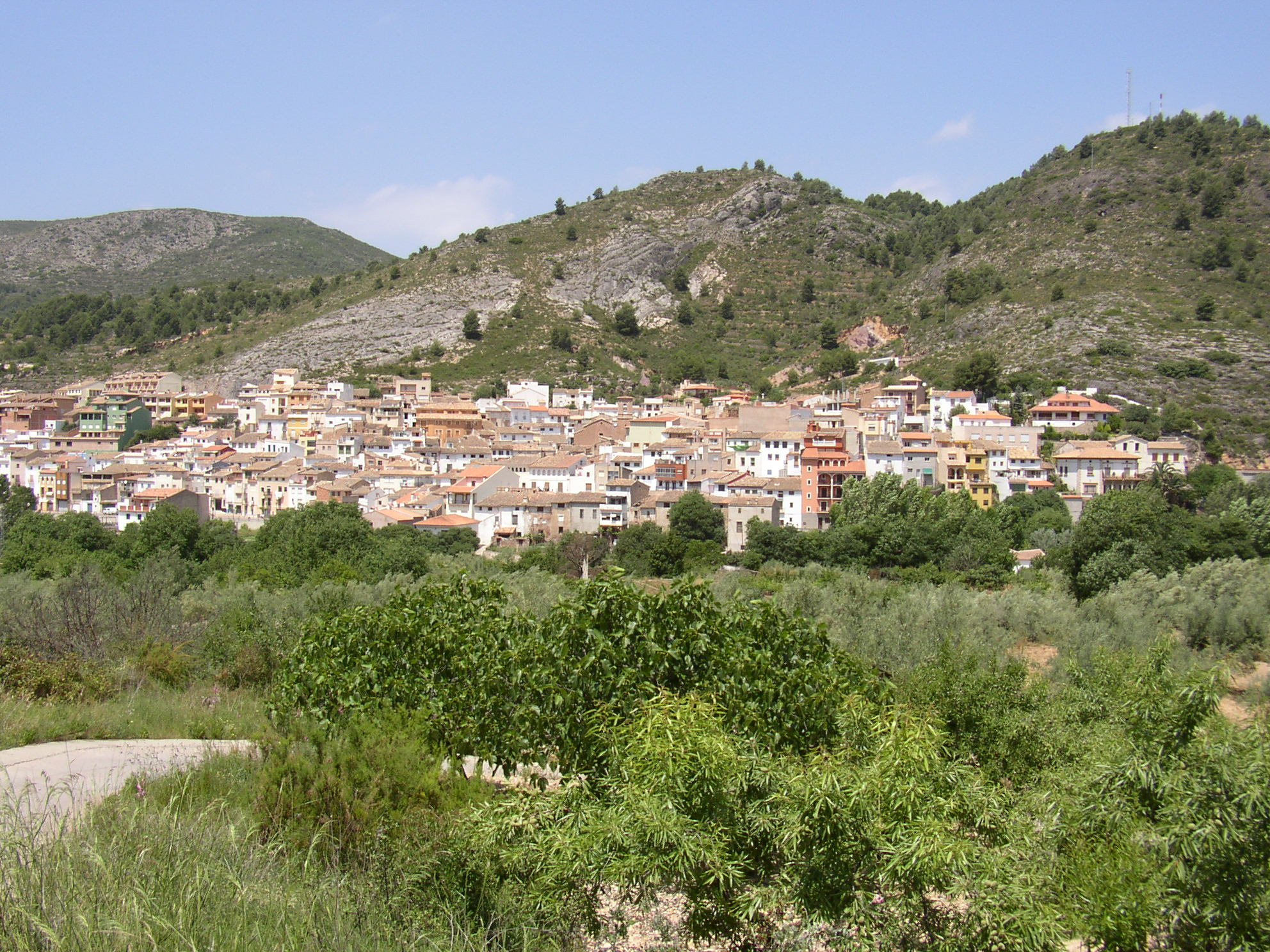

- Flag Coat of arms

- Location in the Province of Castellón Location in the Valencian Community Location in Spain
- Coordinates: 39°54′N 0°27′W
- Country: Spain
- Autonomous community: Valencian Community
- Province: Castellón
- Comarca: Alto Palancia
- Judicial district: Segorbe

Government
  - Mayor: José Antonio Cases Mollar (PP)

Area
  - Total: 21.1 km^{2} (8.1 sq mi)
- Elevation: 440 m (1,440 ft)

Population (2025-01-01)
  - Total: 284
  - Density: 13.5/km^{2} (34.9/sq mi)
- Demonym(s): Vallero, Vallera
- Time zone: UTC+1 (CET)
  - Summer (DST): UTC+2 (CEST)
- Postal code: 12414
- Official language: Spanish
- Website: valldealmonacid.es

Vall de Almonacid is a municipality in the comarca of Alto Palancia, Castellón, Valencia, Spain. The name in Valencian is La Vall d'Almonesir, but the local language is Spanish, not Valencian.

It contains the "Castle of Almonesir".

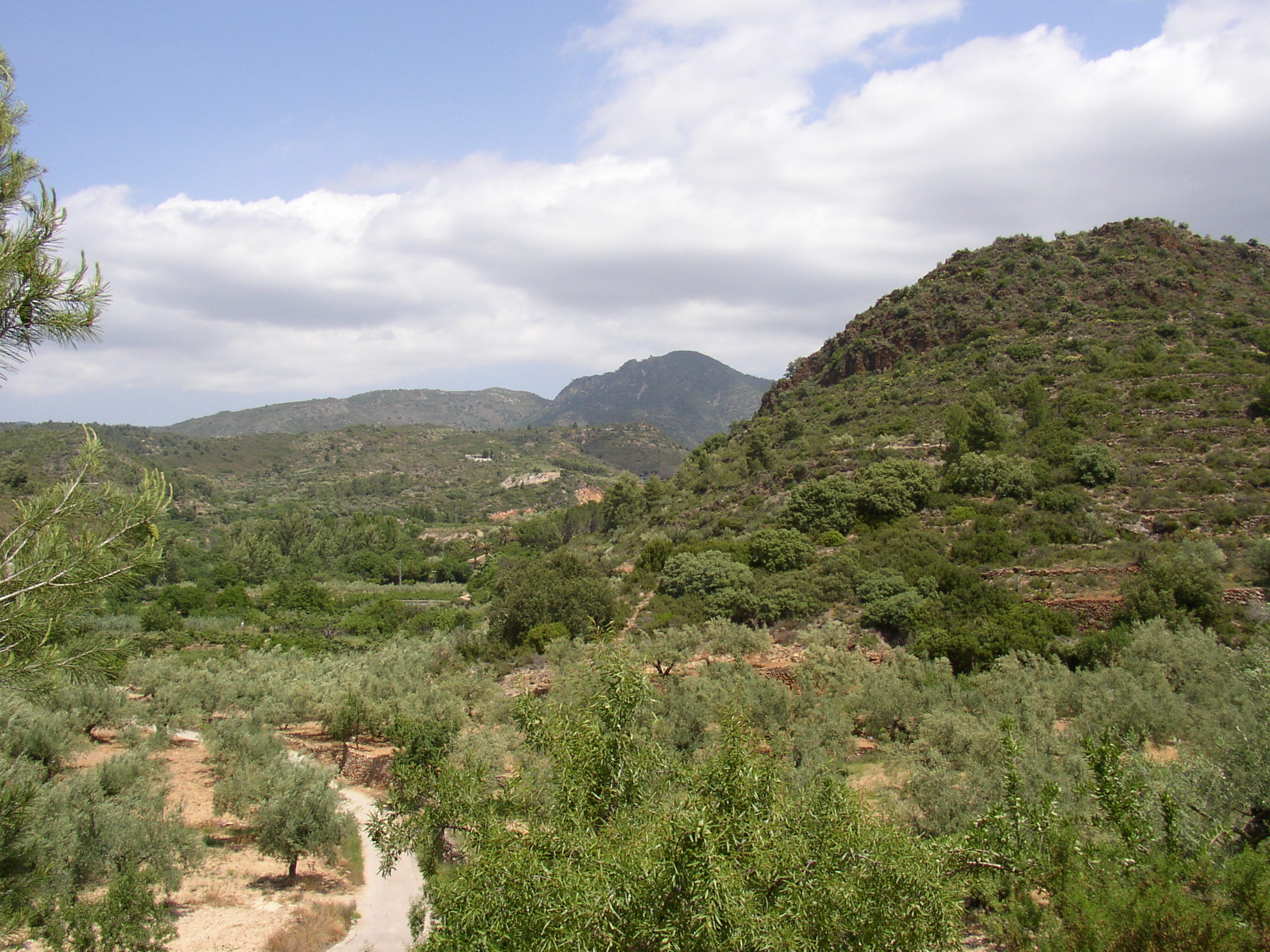
Vall de Almonacid, in the heart of the Serra d'Espadà

== See also ==
- Serra d'Espadà
