= Benafer =

- Municipality
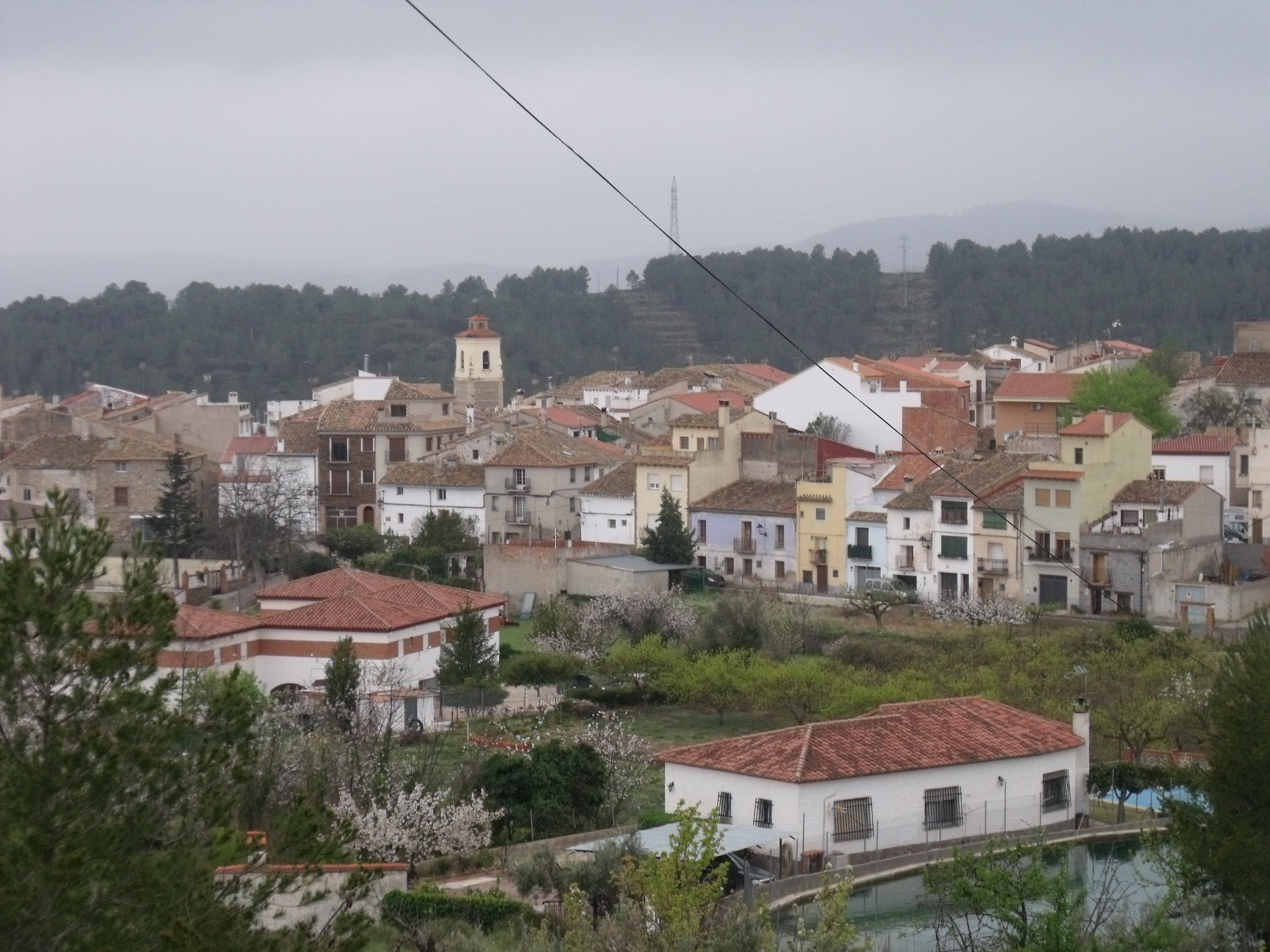
- General view of Benafer.

- Flag Coat of arms

- Location in Spain
- Coordinates: 39°56′6″N 0°34′39″W
- Country: Spain
- Autonomous community: Valencian Community
- Province: Valencia
- Comarca: Alto Palancia
- Judicial district: Benafer

Area
  - Total: 17 km^{2} (6.6 sq mi)
- Elevation: 587 m (1,926 ft)

Population (2025-01-01)
  - Total: 168
  - Density: 9.9/km^{2} (26/sq mi)
- Time zone: UTC+1 (CET)
  - Summer (DST): UTC+2 (CEST)
- Postal code: 12199
- Official language(s): Spanish

Benafer is a municipality in the comarca of Alto Palancia, Castellón, Valencia, Spain.
