= Municipalities of the Valencian Community =

The Valencian Community is made up of a total of 542 municipalities, whose physical space covers an area of 23,255 km² and a total of 5,210,600 inhabitants (INE, 2023). These municipalities are administratively distributed in the provinces of Alicante (141), Castellón (135) and Valencia (266).

Each municipality is run by a council (Valencian: ajuntament, Spanish: ayuntamiento) elected by the residents at periodic nationwide local elections. The council consists of a number of members depending on population, who elect the mayor (Valencian: alcalde or batle, Spanish: alcalde). The city or town hall is located in the main settlement, and deals with provision of local services and administrative matters such as registration of residents. The "main settlement" is not always the biggest settlement, as new urban developments such as tourist resorts can become very big very quickly without achieving any political recognition.

The municipalities of the Valencian Community are grouped into 34 comarques and three provinces. Occasional revisions of the boundaries of comarcas have resulted in municipalities moving from one comarca to another.

== List of municipalities ==
| Official name | Name in Spanish | Name in co-official language (Valencian) | Population (2023) | Area (km^{2}) | Density (2023) | Province | Comarca | INE code |
|---|---|---|---|---|---|---|---|---|
| Agost | Agost | | 5,067 | 66.64 | 76.03 | Alacant / Alicante | Alacantí | 03002 |
| Agres | Agres | | 619 | 25.84 | 23.95 | Alacant / Alicante | Comtat | 03003 |
| Aigües | Aguas de Busot | Aigües | 1,146 | 18.47 | 62.04 | Alacant / Alicante | Alacantí | 03004 |
| Alacant / Alicante | Alicante | Alacant | 349,282 | 201.27 | 1,735.39 | Alacant / Alicante | Alacantí | 03014 |
| Albatera | Albatera | | 13,092 | 61.54 | 212.73 | Alacant / Alicante | Vega Baja | 03005 |
| Alcalalí | Alcalalí | | 1,397 | 14.4 | 97.01 | Alacant / Alicante | Marina Alta | 03006 |
| Alcoleja | Alcolecha | Alcoleja | 188 | 14.56 | 12.91 | Alacant / Alicante | Comtat | 03008 |
| Alcosser | Alcocer de Planes | Alcosser | 259 | 4.39 | 58.99 | Alacant / Alicante | Comtat | 03007 |
| Alcoi / Alcoy | Alcoy | Alcoi | 59,493 | 129.86 | 458.13 | Alacant / Alicante | Alcoià | 03009 |
| Alfafara | Alfafara | | 419 | 19.78 | 21.18 | Alacant / Alicante | Comtat | 03010 |
| L'Alfàs del Pi | Alfaz del Pi | L'Alfàs del Pi | 20,518 | 19.26 | 1,065.31 | Alacant / Alicante | Marina Baixa | 03011 |
| Algorfa | Algorfa | | 3,635 | 18.47 | 196.80 | Alacant / Alicante | Vega Baja | 03012 |
| Algueña | Algueña | L'Alguenya | 1,395 | 18.47 | 75.52 | Alacant / Alicante | Vinalopó Mitjà | 03013 |
| Almoradí | Almoradí | | 21,874 | 42.69 | 512.39 | Alacant / Alicante | Vega Baja | 03015 |
| Almudaina | Almudaina | | 110 | 8.82 | 12.47 | Alacant / Alicante | Comtat | 03016 |
| L'Alqueria d'Asnar | Alquería de Aznar | L'Alqueria d'Asnar | 511 | 1.08 | 473.14 | Alacant / Alicante | Comtat | 03017 |
| Altea | Altea | | 23,820 | 34.43 | 691.83 | Alacant / Alicante | Marina Baixa | 03018 |
| Aspe | Aspe | Asp | 21,473 | 70.57 | 304.27 | Alacant / Alicante | Baix Vinalopó | 03019 |
| L'Atzúbia | Adsubia | L'Atzúbia | 608 | 14.67 | 41.44 | Alacant / Alicante | Marina Alta | 03001 |
| Balones | Balones | | 119 | 11.25 | 10.57 | Alacant / Alicante | Comtat | 03020 |
| Banyeres de Mariola | Bañeres | Banyeres de Mariola | 7,255 | 50.28 | 144.29 | Alacant / Alicante | Alcoià | 03021 |
| Benasau | Benasau | | 173 | 9.04 | 19.13 | Alacant / Alicante | Comtat | 03022 |
| Beneixama | Benejama | Beneixama | 1,697 | 34.89 | 48.63 | Alacant / Alicante | Alt Vinalopó | 03023 |
| Benejúzar | Benejúzar | Benejússer | 5,625 | 9.33 | 602.89 | Alacant / Alicante | Vega Baja | 03024 |
| Benferri | Benferri | | 2,023 | 12.37 | 163.54 | Alacant / Alicante | Vega Baja | 03025 |
| Beniarbeig | Beniarbeig | | 2,353 | 7.4 | 317.97 | Alacant / Alicante | Marina Alta | 03026 |
| Beniardà | Beniardá | Beniardà | 252 | 15.74 | 16.01 | Alacant / Alicante | Marina Baixa | 03027 |
| Beniarrés | Beniarrés | | 1,089 | 20.21 | 53.88 | Alacant / Alicante | Comtat | 03028 |
| Benidoleig | Benidoleig | | 1,218 | 7.48 | 162.83 | Alacant / Alicante | Marina Alta | 03030 |
| Benidorm | Benidorm | | 72,342 | 38.51 | 1,878.52 | Alacant / Alicante | Marina Baixa | 03031 |
| Benifallim | Benifallim | | 111 | 13.69 | 8.10 | Alacant / Alicante | Alcoià | 03032 |
| Benifato | Benifato | | 140 | 11.88 | 11.78 | Alacant / Alicante | Marina Baixa | 03033 |
| Benigembla | Benichembla | Benigembla | 537 | 18.45 | 29.10 | Alacant / Alicante | Marina Alta | 03029 |
| Benijófar | Benijófar | Benijòfer | 3,473 | 4.36 | 796.55 | Alacant / Alicante | Vega Baja | 03034 |
| Benilloba | Benilloba | | 737 | 9.54 | 77.25 | Alacant / Alicante | Comtat | 03035 |
| Benillup | Benillup | | 105 | 3.38 | 31.06 | Alacant / Alicante | Comtat | 03036 |
| Benimantell | Benimantell | | 534 | 37.93 | 14.07 | Alacant / Alicante | Marina Baixa | 03037 |
| Benimarfull | Benimarfull | | 422 | 5.56 | 75.89 | Alacant / Alicante | Comtat | 03038 |
| Benimassot | Benimasot | Benimassot | 105 | 9.51 | 11.04 | Alacant / Alicante | Comtat | 03039 |
| Benimeli | Benimeli | | 455 | 3.5 | 130 | Alacant / Alicante | Marina Alta | 03040 |
| Benissa | Benisa | Benissa | 12,279 | 69.71 | 176.14 | Alacant / Alicante | Marina Alta | 03041 |
| Biar | Biar | | 3,607 | 98.17 | 36.74 | Alacant / Alicante | Alt Vinalopó | 03043 |
| Bigastro | Bigastro | Bigastre | 7,361 | 4.1 | 1,795.36 | Alacant / Alicante | Vega Baja | 03044 |
| Bolulla | Bolulla | | 440 | 13.57 | 32.42 | Alacant / Alicante | Marina Baixa | 03045 |
| Busot | Busot | | 3,534 | 33.84 | 104.43 | Alacant / Alicante | Alacantí | 03046 |
| Callosa de Segura | Callosa de Segura | | 19,484 | 24.91 | 782.17 | Alacant / Alicante | Vega Baja | 03049 |
| Callosa d'en Sarrià | Callosa de Ensarriá | Callosa d'en Sarrià | 7,708 | 34.66 | 222.38 | Alacant / Alicante | Marina Baixa | 03048 |
| Calp | Calpe | Calp | 25,854 | 23.61 | 1,095.04 | Alacant / Alicante | Marina Alta | 03047 |
| El Campello | Campello | El Campello | 29,993 | 55.27 | 542.66 | Alacant / Alicante | Alacantí | 03050 |
| El Camp de Mirra / Campo de Mirra | Campo de Mirra | El Camp de Mirra | 442 | 21.82 | 20.25 | Alacant / Alicante | Alt Vinalopó | 03051 |
| Cañada | Cañada | La Canyada | 1,210 | 19.32 | 62.62 | Alacant / Alicante | Alt Vinalopó | 03052 |
| Castalla | Castalla | | 11,365 | 114.6 | 99.17 | Alacant / Alicante | Alcoià | 03053 |
| Castell de Castells | Castell de Castells | | 445 | 45.93 | 9.68 | Alacant / Alicante | Marina Baixa | 03054 |
| El Castell de Guadalest | Guadalest | El Castell de Guadalest | 274 | 15.96 | 17.16 | Alacant / Alicante | Marina Baixa | 03075 |
| Catral | Catral | | 9,275 | 20.02 | 463.28 | Alacant / Alicante | Vega Baja | 03055 |
| Cocentaina | Cocentaina | | 11,309 | 52.94 | 213.61 | Alacant / Alicante | Comtat | 03056 |
| Confrides | Confrides | | 297 | 39.98 | 7.42 | Alacant / Alicante | Marina Baixa | 03057 |
| Cox | Cox | Coix | 7,513 | 16.71 | 449.61 | Alacant / Alicante | Vega Baja | 03058 |
| Crevillent | Crevillente | Crevillent | 30,191 | 104.55 | 288.77 | Alacant / Alicante | Baix Vinalopó | 03059 |
| Daya Nueva | Daya Nueva | Daia Nova | 1,767 | 7.09 | 249.22 | Alacant / Alicante | Vega Baja | 03061 |
| Daya Vieja | Daya Vieja | Daia Vella | 667 | 3.14 | 212.42 | Alacant / Alicante | Vega Baja | 03062 |
| Dénia | Denia | Dénia | 45,622 | 66.18 | 689.36 | Alacant / Alicante | Marina Alta | 03063 |
| Dolores | Dolores | Dolors | 7,919 | 18.7 | 423.47 | Alacant / Alicante | Vega Baja | 03064 |
| Elx / Elche | Elche | Elx | 238,293 | 326.5 | 729.84 | Alacant / Alicante | Baix Vinalopó | 03065 |
| Elda | Elda | | 53,034 | 45.79 | 1,158.20 | Alacant / Alicante | Vinalopó Mitjà | 03066 |
| Fageca | Facheca | Fageca | 101 | 10.17 | 9.93 | Alacant / Alicante | Comtat | 03067 |
| Famorca | Famorca | | 45 | 9.72 | 4.62 | Alacant / Alicante | Comtat | 03068 |
| Finestrat | Finestrat | | 8,836 | 42.25 | 209.13 | Alacant / Alicante | Marina Baixa | 03069 |
| El Fondó de les Neus / Hondón de las Nieves | Hondón de las Nieves | El Fondó de les Neus | 2,698 | 68.85 | 39.18 | Alacant / Alicante | Vinalopó Mitjà | 03077 |
| Formentera del Segura | Formentera del Segura | | 4,618 | 4.33 | 1,066.51 | Alacant / Alicante | Vega Baja | 03070 |
| Gaianes | Gayanes | Gaianes | 555 | 9.57 | 57.99 | Alacant / Alicante | Comtat | 03072 |
| Gata de Gorgos | Gata de Gorgos | | 6,515 | 20.33 | 320.46 | Alacant / Alicante | Marina Alta | 03071 |
| Gorga | Gorga | | 284 | 9.11 | 31.17 | Alacant / Alicante | Comtat | 03073 |
| Granja de Rocamora | Granja de Rocamora | La Granja de Rocamora | 2,686 | 7.17 | 374.61 | Alacant / Alicante | Vega Baja | 03074 |
| Guardamar del Segura | Guardamar del Segura | | 17,328 | 33.94 | 510.54 | Alacant / Alicante | Vega Baja | 03076 |
| Hondón de los Frailes | Hondón de los Frailes | El Fondó dels Frares | 1,311 | 12.55 | 104.46 | Alacant / Alicante | Vinalopó Mitjà | 03078 |
| Ibi | Ibi | | 23,920 | 62.52 | 382.59 | Alacant / Alicante | Alcoià | 03079 |
| Jacarilla | Jacarilla | Xacarella | 2,108 | 12.2 | 172.78 | Alacant / Alicante | Vega Baja | 03080 |
| Llíber | Llíber | | 946 | 21.93 | 43.13 | Alacant / Alicante | Marina Alta | 03085 |
| Millena | Millena | | 254 | 9.77 | 25.99 | Alacant / Alicante | Comtat | 03086 |
| Monforte del Cid | Monforte del Cid | Montfort | 8,777 | 79.52 | 110.37 | Alacant / Alicante | Vinalopó Mitjà | 03088 |
| Monòver / Monóvar | Monóvar | Monòver | 12,542 | 152.36 | 82.31 | Alacant / Alicante | Vinalopó Mitjà | 03089 |
| Los Montesinos | Los Montesinos | | 5,477 | 14.99 | 365.37 | Alacant / Alicante | Vega Baja | 03903 |
| Murla | Murla | | 575 | 5.81 | 98.96 | Alacant / Alicante | Marina Alta | 03091 |
| Muro de Alcoy | Muro de Alcoy | Muro d'Alcoi | 9,253 | 30.24 | 305.98 | Alacant / Alicante | Comtat | 03092 |
| Mutxamel | Muchamiel | Mutxamel | 27,078 | 47.65 | 568.26 | Alacant / Alicante | Alacantí | 03090 |
| Novelda | Novelda | | 25,771 | 75.72 | 340.34 | Alacant / Alicante | Vinalopó Mitjà | 03093 |
| La Nucia | La Nucía | La Nucia | 18,970 | 21.36 | 888.10 | Alacant / Alicante | Marina Baixa | 03094 |
| Ondara | Ondara | | 7,308 | 10.41 | 702.01 | Alacant / Alicante | Marina Alta | 03095 |
| Onil | Onil | | 7,763 | 48.41 | 160.35 | Alacant / Alicante | Alcoià | 03096 |
| Orba | Orba | | 2,379 | 17.73 | 134.17 | Alacant / Alicante | Marina Alta | 03097 |
| Orihuela | Orihuela | Oriola | 82,449 | 365.36 | 225.66 | Alacant / Alicante | Vega Baja | 03099 |
| L'Orxa / Lorcha | Lorcha | L'Orxa | 587 | 31.76 | 18.48 | Alacant / Alicante | Comtat | 03084 |
| Orxeta | Orcheta | Orxeta | 840 | 24.06 | 34.91 | Alacant / Alicante | Marina Baixa | 03098 |
| Parcent | Parcent | | 1,003 | 11.77 | 85.21 | Alacant / Alicante | Marina Alta | 03100 |
| Pedreguer | Pedreguer | | 8,558 | 29.58 | 289.31 | Alacant / Alicante | Marina Alta | 03101 |
| Pego | Pego | | 10,485 | 52.85 | 198.39 | Alacant / Alicante | Marina Alta | 03102 |
| Penàguila | Penáguila | Penàguila | 313 | 49.92 | 6.27 | Alacant / Alicante | Alcoià | 03103 |
| Petrer | Petrel | Petrer | 33,914 | 104.09 | 325.81 | Alacant / Alicante | Vinalopó Mitjà | 03104 |
| Pilar de la Horadada | Pilar de la Horadada | El Pilar de la Foradada | 23,428 | 77.81 | 301.09 | Alacant / Alicante | Vega Baja | 03902 |
| El Pinós / Pinoso | Pinoso | El Pinós | 8,281 | 126.46 | 65.48 | Alacant / Alicante | Vinalopó Mitjà | 03105 |
| Planes | Planes | | 699 | 38.87 | 17.98 | Alacant / Alicante | Comtat | 03106 |
| El Poble Nou de Benitatxell / Benitachell | Benitachell | El Poble Nou de Benitatxell | 4,858 | 12.65 | 384.03 | Alacant / Alicante | Marina Alta | 03042 |
| Els Poblets | Els Poblets | | 2,763 | 3.62 | 763.25 | Alacant / Alicante | Marina Alta | 03901 |
| Polop | Polop | | 5,339 | 22.56 | 236.65 | Alacant / Alicante | Marina Baixa | 03107 |
| Quatretondeta | Cuatretondeta | Quatretondeta | 136 | 16.7 | 8.14 | Alacant / Alicante | Comtat | 03060 |
| Rafal | Rafal | | 4,800 | 1.57 | 3,057.32 | Alacant / Alicante | Vega Baja | 03109 |
| El Ràfol d'Almúnia | Ráfol de Almunia | El Ràfol d'Almúnia | 721 | 4.88 | 147.74 | Alacant / Alicante | Marina Alta | 03110 |
| Redován | Redován | Redovà | 8,183 | 9.45 | 865.92 | Alacant / Alicante | Vega Baja | 03111 |
| Relleu | Relleu | | 1,248 | 76.87 | 16.23 | Alacant / Alicante | Marina Baixa | 03112 |
| Rojales | Rojales | Rojals | 17,451 | 27.73 | 629.31 | Alacant / Alicante | Vega Baja | 03113 |
| La Romana | La Romana | | 2,632 | 43.29 | 60.79 | Alacant / Alicante | Vinalopó Mitjà | 03114 |
| Sagra | Sagra | | 442 | 5.62 | 78.64 | Alacant / Alicante | Marina Alta | 03115 |
| Salinas | Salinas | Salines | 1,733 | 61.71 | 28.08 | Alacant / Alicante | Alt Vinalopó | 03116 |
| San Fulgencio | San Fulgencio | Sant Fulgenci | 9,443 | 20.7 | 456.18 | Alacant / Alicante | Vega Baja | 03118 |
| San Isidro | San Isidro | Sant Isidre | 2,208 | 11.7 | 188.71 | Alacant / Alicante | Vega Baja | 03904 |
| San Miguel de Salinas | San Miguel de Salinas | Sant Miquel de les Salines | 6,798 | 54.85 | 123.93 | Alacant / Alicante | Vega Baja | 03120 |
| Sanet y Negrals | Sanet y Negrals | Sanet i els Negrals | 737 | 3.94 | 187.05 | Alacant / Alicante | Marina Alta | 03117 |
| Sant Joan d'Alacant | San Juan de Alicante | Sant Joan d'Alacant | 25,275 | 9.64 | 2,621.88 | Alacant / Alicante | Alacantí | 03119 |
| Sant Vicent del Raspeig / San Vicente del Raspeig | San Vicente del Raspeig | Sant Vicent del Raspeig | 59,928 | 40.55 | 1,477.87 | Alacant / Alicante | Alacantí | 03122 |
| Santa Pola | Santa Pola | | 37,816 | 58.16 | 650.20 | Alacant / Alicante | Baix Vinalopó | 03121 |
| Sax | Sax | Saix | 10,072 | 63.48 | 158.66 | Alacant / Alicante | Alt Vinalopó | 03123 |
| Sella | Sella | | 607 | 38.72 | 15.67 | Alacant / Alicante | Marina Baixa | 03124 |
| Senija | Senija | | 670 | 4.79 | 139.87 | Alacant / Alicante | Marina Alta | 03125 |
| Tàrbena | Tárbena | Tàrbena | 630 | 31.67 | 19.89 | Alacant / Alicante | Marina Baixa | 03127 |
| Teulada | Teulada | | 12,515 | 32.25 | 388.06 | Alacant / Alicante | Marina Alta | 03128 |
| Tibi | Tibi | | 1,808 | 70.38 | 25.68 | Alacant / Alicante | Alcoià | 03129 |
| Tollos | Tollos | | 40 | 15.97 | 2.50 | Alacant / Alicante | Comtat | 03130 |
| Tormos | Tormos | | 339 | 5.36 | 63.24 | Alacant / Alicante | Marina Alta | 03131 |
| La Torre de les Maçanes / Torremanzanas | Torremanzanas | La Torre de les Maçanes | 714 | 36.48 | 19.57 | Alacant / Alicante | Alacantí | 03132 |
| Torrevieja | Torrevieja | Torrevella | 89,290 | 71.76 | 1,244.28 | Alacant / Alicante | Vega Baja | 03133 |
| La Vall d'Alcalà | Valle de Alcalá | La Vall d'Alcalà | 174 | 22.85 | 7.61 | Alacant / Alicante | Marina Alta | 03134 |
| La Vall d'Ebo | Vall de Ebo | La Vall d'Ebo | 230 | 32.43 | 7.09 | Alacant / Alicante | Marina Alta | 03135 |
| La Vall de Gallinera | Vall de Gallinera | La Vall de Gallinera | 581 | 53.63 | 10.83 | Alacant / Alicante | Marina Alta | 03136 |
| La Vall de Laguar | Vall de Laguart | La Vall de Laguar | 873 | 23.05 | 37.87 | Alacant / Alicante | Marina Alta | 03137 |
| El Verger | Vergel | El Verger | 5,101 | 8.16 | 625.12 | Alacant / Alicante | Marina Alta | 03138 |
| La Vila Joiosa / Villajoyosa | Villajoyosa | La Vila Joiosa | 36,093 | 59.25 | 609.16 | Alacant / Alicante | Marina Baixa | 03139 |
| Villena | Villena | | 34,144 | 345.38 | 98.85 | Alacant / Alicante | Alt Vinalopó | 03140 |
| Xàbia / Jávea | Jávea | Xàbia | 29,760 | 68.59 | 433.88 | Alacant / Alicante | Marina Alta | 03082 |
| Xaló | Jalón | Xaló | 2,964 | 34.59 | 85.68 | Alacant / Alicante | Marina Alta | 03081 |
| Xixona / Jijona | Jijona | Xixona | 7,032 | 163.76 | 42.94 | Alacant / Alicante | Alacantí | 03083 |
| Aín | Ahín | Aín | 130 | 12.29 | 10.57 | Castelló / Castellón | Plana Baixa | 12002 |
| Albocàsser | Albocácer | Albocàsser | 1,302 | 82.29 | 15.82 | Castelló / Castellón | Alt Maestrat | 12003 |
| Alcalà de Xivert | Alcalá de Chivert | Alcalà de Xivert | 7,160 | 167.56 | 42.73 | Castelló / Castellón | Plana Alta | 12004 |
| L'Alcora | Alcora | L'Alcora | 10,526 | 95.18 | 110.59 | Castelló / Castellón | Alcalatén | 12005 |
| Alcudia de Veo | Alcudia de Veo | L'Alcúdia de Veo | 203 | 30.66 | 6.62 | Castelló / Castellón | Plana Baixa | 12006 |
| Alfondeguilla | Alfondeguilla | | 873 | 28.33 | 30.81 | Castelló / Castellón | Plana Baixa | 12007 |
| Algimia de Almonacid | Algimia de Amonacid | Algímia d'Almonesir | 249 | 20.33 | 12.24 | Castelló / Castellón | Alto Palancia | 12008 |
| Almassora | Almazora | Almassora | 27,892 | 32.97 | 845.98 | Castelló / Castellón | Plana Alta | 12009 |
| Almedíjar | Almedíjar | Almedíxer | 280 | 20.9 | 13.39 | Castelló / Castellón | Alto Palancia | 12010 |
| Almenara | Almenara | | 6,591 | 27.63 | 238.54 | Castelló / Castellón | Plana Baixa | 12011 |
| Les Alqueries / Alquerías del Niño Perdido | Alquerías del Niño Perdido | Les Alqueries | 4,539 | 12.61 | 359.95 | Castelló / Castellón | Plana Baixa | 12901 |
| Altura | Altura | | 3,695 | 129.43 | 28.54 | Castelló / Castellón | Alto Palancia | 12012 |
| Arañuel | Arañuel | Aranyel | 165 | 19.16 | 8.61 | Castelló / Castellón | Alto Mijares | 12013 |
| Ares del Maestrat | Ares del Maestre | Ares del Maestrat | 174 | 118.67 | 1.46 | Castelló / Castellón | Alt Maestrat | 12014 |
| Argelita | Argelita | Argeleta | 156 | 15.47 | 10.08 | Castelló / Castellón | Alto Mijares | 12015 |
| Artana | Artana | | 1,980 | 36.33 | 54.50 | Castelló / Castellón | Plana Baixa | 12016 |
| Atzeneta del Maestrat | Adzaneta | Atzeneta del Maestrat | 1,319 | 71.16 | 18.53 | Castelló / Castellón | Alcalatén | 12001 |
| Ayódar | Ayódar | Aiòder | 178 | 24.36 | 7.30 | Castelló / Castellón | Alto Mijares | 12017 |
| Azuébar | Azuébar | Assuévar | 336 | 23.4 | 14.35 | Castelló / Castellón | Alto Palancia | 12018 |
| Barracas | Barracas | Barraques | 198 | 42.15 | 4.69 | Castelló / Castellón | Alto Palancia | 12020 |
| Bejís | Bejís | Begís | 409 | 42.35 | 9.65 | Castelló / Castellón | Alto Palancia | 12022 |
| Benafer | Benafer | | 164 | 17.03 | 9.63 | Castelló / Castellón | Alto Palancia | 12024 |
| Benafigos | Benafigos | | 135 | 35.6 | 3.79 | Castelló / Castellón | Alcalatén | 12025 |
| Benassal | Benasal | Benassal | 1,026 | 79.58 | 12.89 | Castelló / Castellón | Alt Maestrat | 12026 |
| Benicarló | Benicarló | | 28,681 | 47.86 | 599.26 | Castelló / Castellón | Baix Maestrat | 12027 |
| Benicàssim / Benicasim | Benicasim | Benicàssim | 19,951 | 36.29 | 549.76 | Castelló / Castellón | Plana Alta | 12028 |
| Benlloc | Benlloch | Benlloc | 1,108 | 43.52 | 25.45 | Castelló / Castellón | Plana Alta | 12029 |
| Betxí | Bechí | Betxí | 5,580 | 22.44 | 248.66 | Castelló / Castellón | Plana Baixa | 12021 |
| Borriana / Burriana | Burriana | Borriana | 35,750 | 46.99 | 760.80 | Castelló / Castellón | Plana Baixa | 12032 |
| Borriol | Borriol | | 5,865 | 61.56 | 95.27 | Castelló / Castellón | Plana Alta | 12031 |
| Cabanes | Cabanes | | 3,222 | 131.56 | 24.49 | Castelló / Castellón | Plana Alta | 12033 |
| Càlig | Cálig | Càlig | 2,013 | 27.47 | 73.27 | Castelló / Castellón | Baix Maestrat | 12034 |
| Canet lo Roig | Canet lo Roig | | 685 | 68.68 | 9.97 | Castelló / Castellón | Baix Maestrat | 12036 |
| Castell de Cabres | Castell de Cabres | | 19 | 30.72 | 0.61 | Castelló / Castellón | Baix Maestrat | 12037 |
| Castellfort | Castellfort | | 188 | 66.74 | 2.81 | Castelló / Castellón | Ports | 12038 |
| Castellnovo | Castellnovo | Castellnou | 888 | 19.2 | 46.25 | Castelló / Castellón | Alto Palancia | 12039 |
| Castelló de la Plana | Castellón de la Plana | Castelló de la Plana | 176,238 | 111.33 | 1,583.02 | Castelló / Castellón | Plana Alta | 12040 |
| Castillo de Villamalefa | Castillo de Villamalefa | El Castell de Vilamalefa | 109 | 37.74 | 2.88 | Castelló / Castellón | Alto Mijares | 12041 |
| Catí | Catí | | 724 | 102.35 | 7.07 | Castelló / Castellón | Alt Maestrat | 12042 |
| Caudiel | Caudiel | | 716 | 62.38 | 11.47 | Castelló / Castellón | Alto Palancia | 12043 |
| Cervera del Maestre | Cervera del Maestre | Cervera del Maestrat | 656 | 93.24 | 7.03 | Castelló / Castellón | Baix Maestrat | 12044 |
| Chóvar | Chóvar | Xòvar | 310 | 18.31 | 16.93 | Castelló / Castellón | Alto Palancia | 12056 |
| Cinctorres | Cinctorres | | 427 | 35.06 | 12.17 | Castelló / Castellón | Ports | 12045 |
| Cirat | Cirat | | 223 | 41.1 | 5.42 | Castelló / Castellón | Alto Mijares | 12046 |
| Cortes de Arenoso | Cortes de Arenoso | Cortes d'Arenós | 304 | 80.59 | 3.77 | Castelló / Castellón | Alto Mijares | 12048 |
| Costur | Costur | | 535 | 21.93 | 24.39 | Castelló / Castellón | Alcalatén | 12049 |
| Les Coves de Vinromà | Cuevas de Vinromá | Les Coves de Vinromá | 1,813 | 136.44 | 13.28 | Castelló / Castellón | Plana Alta | 12050 |
| Culla | Culla | | 480 | 115.86 | 4.14 | Castelló / Castellón | Alt Maestrat | 12051 |
| Eslida | Eslida | | 758 | 18.13 | 41.80 | Castelló / Castellón | Plana Baixa | 12057 |
| Espadilla | Espadilla | Espadella | 90 | 11.96 | 7.52 | Castelló / Castellón | Alto Mijares | 12058 |
| Fanzara | Fanzara | | 294 | 34.98 | 8.40 | Castelló / Castellón | Alto Mijares | 12059 |
| Figueroles | Figueroles | | 518 | 12.9 | 40.15 | Castelló / Castellón | Alcalatén | 12060 |
| Forcall | Forcall | El Forcall | 473 | 39.21 | 12.06 | Castelló / Castellón | Ports | 12061 |
| Fuente la Reina | Fuente la Reina | La Font de la Reina | 59 | 7.5 | 7.86 | Castelló / Castellón | Alto Mijares | 12063 |
| Fuentes de Ayódar | Fuentes de Ayódar | Les Fonts d'Aiòder | 98 | 10.98 | 8.92 | Castelló / Castellón | Alto Mijares | 12064 |
| Gaibiel | Gaibiel | | 197 | 18.08 | 10.89 | Castelló / Castellón | Alto Palancia | 12065 |
| Geldo | Geldo | | 650 | 0.56 | 1,160.71 | Castelló / Castellón | Alto Palancia | 12067 |
| Herbers | Herbés | Herbers | 72 | 27.12 | 2.65 | Castelló / Castellón | Ports | 12068 |
| Higueras | Higueras | Figueres | 50 | 11.84 | 4.22 | Castelló / Castellón | Alto Palancia | 12069 |
| La Jana | La Jana | | 678 | 19.5 | 34.76 | Castelló / Castellón | Baix Maestrat | 12070 |
| Jérica | Jérica | Xèrica | 1,794 | 78.27 | 22.92 | Castelló / Castellón | Alto Palancia | 12071 |
| La Llosa | La Llosa | | 1,003 | 10.03 | 100 | Castelló / Castellón | Plana Baixa | 12074 |
| Llucena / Lucena del Cid | Lucena del Cid | Llucena | 1,369 | 137.04 | 9.98 | Castelló / Castellón | Alcalatén | 12072 |
| Ludiente | Ludiente | Lludient | 155 | 31.35 | 4.94 | Castelló / Castellón | Alto Mijares | 12073 |
| La Mata de Morella | La Mata de Morella | | 179 | 15.16 | 11.80 | Castelló / Castellón | Ports | 12075 |
| Matet | Matet | | 84 | 14.89 | 5.64 | Castelló / Castellón | Alto Palancia | 12076 |
| Moncofa | Moncófar | Moncofa | 7,747 | 14.53 | 533.17 | Castelló / Castellón | Plana Baixa | 12077 |
| Montán | Montán | Montant | 399 | 34.1 | 11.70 | Castelló / Castellón | Alto Mijares | 12078 |
| Montanejos | Montanejos | | 603 | 37.8 | 15.95 | Castelló / Castellón | Alto Mijares | 12079 |
| Morella | Morella | | 2,492 | 413.54 | 6.02 | Castelló / Castellón | Ports | 12080 |
| Navajas | Navajas | | 840 | 7.89 | 106.47 | Castelló / Castellón | Alto Palancia | 12081 |
| Nules | Nules | | 13,827 | 50.53 | 273.63 | Castelló / Castellón | Plana Baixa | 12082 |
| Olocau del Rey | Olocau del Rey | Olocau del Rei | 126 | 43.98 | 2.86 | Castelló / Castellón | Ports | 12083 |
| Onda | Onda | | 25,547 | 108.2 | 236.10 | Castelló / Castellón | Plana Baixa | 12084 |
| Orpesa / Oropesa del Mar | Oropesa del Mar | Orpesa | 10,958 | 26.55 | 412.73 | Castelló / Castellón | Plana Alta | 12085 |
| Palanques | Palanques | | 36 | 14.32 | 2.51 | Castelló / Castellón | Ports | 12087 |
| Pavías | Pavías | Pavies | 74 | 14.41 | 5.13 | Castelló / Castellón | Alto Palancia | 12088 |
| Peníscola / Peñíscola | Peñíscola | Peníscola | 8,449 | 78.97 | 106.98 | Castelló / Castellón | Baix Maestrat | 12089 |
| Pina de Montalgrao | Pina de Montalgrao | Pina | 119 | 31.6 | 3.76 | Castelló / Castellón | Alto Palancia | 12090 |
| La Pobla de Benifassà | Puebla de Benifasar | La Pobla de Benifassà | 235 | 136.17 | 1.72 | Castelló / Castellón | Baix Maestrat | 12093 |
| La Pobla Tornesa | Puebla-Tornesa | La Pobla Tornesa | 1,309 | 25.91 | 50.52 | Castelló / Castellón | Plana Alta | 12094 |
| Portell de Morella | Portell de Morella | | 166 | 49.4 | 3.36 | Castelló / Castellón | Ports | 12091 |
| Puebla de Arenoso | Puebla de Arenoso | La Pobla d'Arenós | 169 | 42.53 | 3.97 | Castelló / Castellón | Alto Mijares | 12092 |
| Ribesalbes | Ribesalbes | | 1,135 | 8.54 | 132.90 | Castelló / Castellón | Plana Baixa | 12095 |
| Rossell | Rosell | Rossell | 891 | 74.88 | 11.89 | Castelló / Castellón | Baix Maestrat | 12096 |
| Sacañet | Sacañet | Sacanyet | 86 | 30.5 | 2.81 | Castelló / Castellón | Alto Palancia | 12097 |
| La Salzadella | Salsadella | La Salzadella | 660 | 49.92 | 13.22 | Castelló / Castellón | Baix Maestrat | 12098 |
| San Rafael del Río | San Rafael del Río | Sant Rafel del Riu | 494 | 21.15 | 23.35 | Castelló / Castellón | Baix Maestrat | 12101 |
| Sant Joan de Moró | San Juan de Moró | Sant Joan de Moró | 3,516 | 28.66 | 122.67 | Castelló / Castellón | Plana Alta | 12902 |
| Sant Jordi / San Jorge | San Jorge | Sant Jordi | 1,249 | 36.49 | 34.22 | Castelló / Castellón | Baix Maestrat | 12099 |
| Sant Mateu | San Mateo | Sant Mateu | 1,987 | 64.62 | 30.74 | Castelló / Castellón | Baix Maestrat | 12100 |
| Santa Magdalena de Pulpis | Santa Magdalena de Pulpis | Santa Magdalena de Polpís | 784 | 66.49 | 11.79 | Castelló / Castellón | Baix Maestrat | 12102 |
| Segorbe | Segorbe | Segorb | 9,425 | 106.2 | 88.74 | Castelló / Castellón | Alto Palancia | 12104 |
| La Serratella | Sarratella | La Serratella | 110 | 18.81 | 5.84 | Castelló / Castellón | Plana Alta | 12103 |
| Sierra Engarcerán | Sierra Engarcerán | La Serra d'en Galceran | 1,045 | 81.98 | 12.74 | Castelló / Castellón | Plana Alta | 12105 |
| Soneja | Soneja | Soneixa | 1,508 | 29.1 | 51.82 | Castelló / Castellón | Alto Palancia | 12106 |
| Sot de Ferrer | Sot de Ferrer | | 474 | 8.64 | 54.86 | Castelló / Castellón | Alto Palancia | 12107 |
| Suera / Sueras | Sueras | Suera | 572 | 22.22 | 25.74 | Castelló / Castellón | Plana Baixa | 12108 |
| Tales | Tales | | 852 | 14.53 | 58.63 | Castelló / Castellón | Plana Baixa | 12109 |
| Teresa | Teresa | | 250 | 19.89 | 12.56 | Castelló / Castellón | Alto Palancia | 12110 |
| Tírig | Tírig | | 430 | 42.34 | 10.15 | Castelló / Castellón | Alt Maestrat | 12111 |
| Todolella | Todolella | La Todolella | 144 | 34.03 | 4.23 | Castelló / Castellón | Ports | 12112 |
| Toga | Toga | | 112 | 13.52 | 8.28 | Castelló / Castellón | Alto Mijares | 12113 |
| Torás | Torás | Toràs | 256 | 16.78 | 15.25 | Castelló / Castellón | Alto Palancia | 12114 |
| El Toro | El Toro | | 248 | 109.95 | 2.25 | Castelló / Castellón | Alto Palancia | 12115 |
| Torralba del Pinar | Torralba del Pinar | Torralba | 69 | 21.19 | 3.25 | Castelló / Castellón | Alto Mijares | 12116 |
| Torreblanca | Torreblanca | | 5,630 | 29.79 | 188.98 | Castelló / Castellón | Plana Alta | 12117 |
| Torrechiva | Torrechiva | Torre-xiva | 114 | 11.85 | 9.62 | Castelló / Castellón | Alto Mijares | 12118 |
| La Torre d'en Besora | Torre Embesora | La Torre d'en Besora | 164 | 12.31 | 13.32 | Castelló / Castellón | Alt Maestrat | 12119 |
| La Torre d'en Doménec | Torre Endoménech | La Torre d'en Doménec | 175 | 3.19 | 54.85 | Castelló / Castellón | Plana Alta | 12120 |
| Traiguera | Traiguera | | 1,336 | 59.76 | 22.35 | Castelló / Castellón | Baix Maestrat | 12121 |
| Les Useres / Useras | Useras | Les Useres | 985 | 80.69 | 12.20 | Castelló / Castellón | Alcalatén | 12122 |
| Vall d'Alba | Vall d'Alba | La Vall d'Alba | 3,054 | 52.92 | 57.70 | Castelló / Castellón | Plana Alta | 12124 |
| Vall de Almonacid | Vall de Almonacid | La Vall d'Almonesir | 286 | 21.12 | 13.54 | Castelló / Castellón | Alto Palancia | 12125 |
| La Vall d'Uixó | Vall de Uxó | La Vall d'Uixó | 31,611 | 67.08 | 471.74 | Castelló / Castellón | Plana Baixa | 12126 |
| Vallat | Vallat | | 66 | 5.01 | 13.17 | Castelló / Castellón | Alto Mijares | 12123 |
| Vallibona | Vallibona | | 62 | 91.37 | 0.67 | Castelló / Castellón | Ports | 12127 |
| Vilafamés | Villafamés | Vilafamés | 1,915 | 70.55 | 27.14 | Castelló / Castellón | Plana Alta | 12128 |
| Vilafranca / Villafranca del Cid | Villafranca del Cid | Vilafranca | 2,148 | 93.85 | 22.88 | Castelló / Castellón | Alt Maestrat | 12129 |
| Vilanova d'Alcolea | Villanueva de Alcolea | Vilanova d'Alcolea | 575 | 68.41 | 8.40 | Castelló / Castellón | Plana Alta | 12132 |
| Vilar de Canes | Villar de Canes | Vilar de Canes | 159 | 15.91 | 9.99 | Castelló / Castellón | Alt Maestrat | 12134 |
| Vila-real | Villarreal | Vila-real | 51,852 | 55.12 | 940.71 | Castelló / Castellón | Plana Baixa | 12135 |
| La Vilavella | Villavieja | La Vilavella | 3,074 | 6.15 | 499.83 | Castelló / Castellón | Plana Baixa | 12136 |
| Villahermosa del Río | Villahermosa del Río | Vilafermosa | 488 | 108.88 | 4.48 | Castelló / Castellón | Alto Mijares | 12130 |
| Villamalur | Villamalur | Vilamalur | 95 | 19.47 | 4.87 | Castelló / Castellón | Alto Mijares | 12131 |
| Villanueva de Viver | Villanueva de Viver | Vilanova de Viver | 110 | 5.95 | 18.48 | Castelló / Castellón | Alto Mijares | 12133 |
| Villores | Villores | | 54 | 5.31 | 10.16 | Castelló / Castellón | Ports | 12137 |
| Vinaròs | Vinaroz | Vinaròs | 29,686 | 95.46 | 310.97 | Castelló / Castellón | Baix Maestrat | 12138 |
| Vistabella del Maestrat | Vistabella del Maestrazgo | Vistabella del Maestrat | 369 | 151 | 2.44 | Castelló / Castellón | Alt Maestrat | 12139 |
| Viver | Viver | | 1,683 | 49.93 | 33.70 | Castelló / Castellón | Alto Palancia | 12140 |
| Xert | Chert | Xert | 686 | 82.51 | 8.31 | Castelló / Castellón | Baix Maestrat | 12152 |
| Xilxes / Chilches | Chilches | Xilxes | 2,981 | 13.58 | 219.51 | Castelló / Castellón | Plana Baixa | 12053 |
| Xodos / Chodos | Chodos | Xodos | 117 | 44.27 | 2.64 | Castelló / Castellón | Alcalatén | 12155 |
| Zorita del Maestrazgo | Zorita del Maestrazgo | Sorita | 117 | 68.83 | 1.69 | Castelló / Castellón | Ports | 12141 |
| Zucaina | Zucaina | Sucaina | 176 | 51.57 | 3.41 | Castelló / Castellón | Alto Mijares | 12142 |
| Ademuz | Ademuz | Ademús | 1,004 | 100.42 | 9.99 | València / Valencia | Rincón de Ademuz | 46001 |
| Ador | Ador | | 1,699 | 13.81 | 123.02 | València / Valencia | Safor | 46002 |
| Agullent | Agullent | | 2,400 | 16.24 | 147.78 | València / Valencia | Vall d'Albaida | 46004 |
| Aielo de Malferit | Ayelo de Malferit | Aielo de Malferit | 4,601 | 26.74 | 172.06 | València / Valencia | Vall d'Albaida | 46042 |
| Aielo de Rugat | Ayelo de Rugat | Aielo de Rugat | 163 | 7.83 | 20.81 | València / Valencia | Vall d'Albaida | 46043 |
| Alaquàs | Alacuás | Alaquàs | 29,825 | 3.9 | 7,647.43 | València / Valencia | Horta Oest | 46005 |
| Albaida | Albaida | | 6,102 | 35.41 | 172.32 | València / Valencia | Vall d'Albaida | 46006 |
| Albal | Albal | | 17,024 | 7.33 | 2,322.51 | València / Valencia | Horta Sud | 46007 |
| Albalat de la Ribera | Albalat de la Ribera | | 3,411 | 14.35 | 237.70 | València / Valencia | Ribera Baixa | 46008 |
| Albalat dels Sorells | Albalat dels Sorells | | 4,518 | 4.62 | 977.52 | València / Valencia | Horta Nord | 46009 |
| Albalat dels Tarongers | Albalat de Taronchers | Albalat dels Tarongers | 1,428 | 21.34 | 66.91 | València / Valencia | Camp de Morvedre | 46010 |
| Alberic | Alberique | Alberic | 10,815 | 26.79 | 403.69 | València / Valencia | Ribera Alta | 46011 |
| Alborache | Alborache | Alboraig | 1,389 | 27.33 | 50.82 | València / Valencia | Hoya de Buñol | 46012 |
| Alboraia / Alboraya | Alboraya | Alboraia | 25,792 | 8.34 | 3,092.56 | València / Valencia | Horta Nord | 46013 |
| Albuixech | Albuixech | Albuixec | 4,343 | 4.42 | 982.57 | València / Valencia | Horta Nord | 46014 |
| Alcàntera de Xúquer | Alcántara de Júcar | Alcàntera de Xúquer | 1,414 | 3.33 | 424.62 | València / Valencia | Ribera Alta | 46016 |
| Alcàsser | Alcácer | Alcàsser | 10,575 | 9 | 1,175 | València / Valencia | Horta Sud | 46015 |
| Alcublas | Alcublas | Les Alcubles | 635 | 43.55 | 14.58 | València / Valencia | Serranos | 46018 |
| L'Alcúdia | La Alcudia | L'Alcúdia | 12,197 | 23.67 | 515.29 | València / Valencia | Ribera Alta | 46019 |
| L'Alcúdia de Crespins | Alcudia de Crespins | L'Alcúdia de Crespins | 5,361 | 5.17 | 1,036.94 | València / Valencia | Costera | 46020 |
| Aldaia | Aldaya | Aldaia | 33,376 | 16.05n | 2,079.50 | València / Valencia | Horta Oest | 46021 |
| Alfafar | Alfafar | | 21,879 | 10.04 | 2,179.18 | València / Valencia | Horta Sud | 46022 |
| Alfara de la Baronia | Alfara de la Baronía | Alfara de la Baronia | 611 | 11.71 | 52.17 | València / Valencia | Camp de Morvedre | 46024 |
| Alfara del Patriarca | Alfara del Patriarca | | 3,455 | 1.98 | 1,744.94 | València / Valencia | Horta Nord | 46025 |
| Alfarp | Alfarp | Alfarb | 1,618 | 20.58 | 78.62 | València / Valencia | Comarca | 46026 |
| Alfarrasí | Alfarrasí | | 1,183 | 6.38 | 185.42 | València / Valencia | Vall d'Albaida | 46027 |
| Alfauir | Alfahuir | Alfauir | 477 | 6.22 | 76.68 | València / Valencia | Safor | 46023 |
| Algar de Palancia | Algar de Palancia | Algar de Palància | 527 | 13.15 | 40.07 | València / Valencia | Camp de Morvedre | 46028 |
| Algemesí | Algemesí | | 27,438 | 41.3 | 664.35 | València / Valencia | Ribera Alta | 46029 |
| Algímia d'Alfara | Algimia de Alfara | Algímia d'Alfara | 1,109 | 14.45 | 76.74 | València / Valencia | Camp de Morvedre | 46030 |
| Alginet | Alginet | | 14,442 | 24.07 | 600 | València / Valencia | Ribera Alta | 46031 |
| Almàssera | Almácera | Almàssera | 7,504 | 2.74 | 2,738.68 | València / Valencia | Horta Nord | 46032 |
| Almiserà | Almiserat | Almiserà | 279 | 7.44 | 37.5 | València / Valencia | Safor | 46033 |
| Almoines | Almoines | | 2,519 | 2.12 | 1,188.20 | València / Valencia | Safor | 46034 |
| Almussafes | Almusafes | Almussafes | 8,996 | 10.76 | 836.05 | València / Valencia | Ribera Baixa | 46035 |
| Alpuente | Alpuente | Alpont | 667 | 138.33 | 4.82 | València / Valencia | Serranos | 46036 |
| L'Alqueria de la Comtessa | Alquería de la Condesa | L'Alqueria de la Comtessa | 1,523 | 2.15 | 708.37 | València / Valencia | Safor | 46037 |
| Alzira | Alcira | Alzira | 46,421 | 110.49 | 420.13 | València / Valencia | Ribera Alta | 46017 |
| Andilla | Andilla | | 331 | 142.58 | 2.32 | València / Valencia | Serranos | 46038 |
| Anna | Anna | | 2,593 | 22.45 | 115.50 | València / Valencia | Canal de Navarrés | 46040 |
| Antella | Antella | | 1,114 | 17.58 | 63.36 | València / Valencia | Ribera Alta | 46041 |
| Aras de los Olmos | Aras de los Olmos | Ares dels Oms | 381 | 76.04 | 5.01 | València / Valencia | Serranos | 46041 |
| Atzeneta d'Albaida | Adzaneta de Albaida | Atzeneta d'Albaida | 1,161 | 6.06 | 191.58 | València / Valencia | Vall d'Albaida | 46003 |
| Ayora | Ayora | Aiora | 5,223 | 446.58 | 11.69 | València / Valencia | Valle de Ayora | 46044 |
| Barx | Bárig | Barx | 1,476 | 16.1 | 91.67 | València / Valencia | Safor | 46046 |
| Barxeta | Barcheta | Barxeta | 1,545 | 28.52 | 54.17 | València / Valencia | Costera | 46045 |
| Bèlgida | Bélgida | Bèlgida | 632 | 17.26 | 36.61 | València / Valencia | Vall d'Albaida | 46047 |
| Bellreguard | Bellreguard | Bellreguart | 4,811 | 2.85 | 1,688.07 | València / Valencia | Safor | 46048 |
| Bellús | Bellús | | 306 | 9.54 | 32.07 | València / Valencia | Vall d'Albaida | 46049 |
| Benagéber | Benagéber | Benaixeve | 168 | 69.82 | 2.40 | València / Valencia | Serranos | 46050 |
| Benaguasil | Benaguacil | Benaguasil | 11,877 | 25.4 | 467.59 | València / Valencia | Camp de Túria | 46051 |
| Benavites | Benavites | | 674 | 4.27 | 157.84 | València / Valencia | Camp de Morvedre | 46052 |
| Beneixida | Benegida | Beneixida | 655 | 3.2 | 204.68 | València / Valencia | Ribera Alta | 46053 |
| Benetússer | Benetúser | Benetússer | 15,879 | 0.78 | 20,357.69 | València / Valencia | Horta Sud | 46054 |
| Beniarjó | Beniarjó | | 1,872 | 2.75 | 680.72 | València / Valencia | Safor | 46055 |
| Beniatjar | Beniatjar | | 217 | 11.37 | 19.08 | València / Valencia | Vall d'Albaida | 46056 |
| Benicolet | Benicolet | | 599 | 11.29 | 53.05 | València / Valencia | Vall d'Albaida | 46057 |
| Benicull de Xúquer | Benicull | Benicull de Xúquer | 1,134 | 3.5 | 324 | València / Valencia | Ribera Baixa | 46904 |
| Benifaió | Benifayó | Benifaió | 11,984 | 20.15 | 594.73 | València / Valencia | Ribera Alta | 46060 |
| Benifairó de la Valldigna | Benifairó de la Valldigna | | 1,554 | 20.2 | 76.93 | València / Valencia | Safor | 46059 |
| Benifairó de les Valls | Benifairó de les Valls | | 2,320 | 4.35 | 533.33 | València / Valencia | Camp de Morvedre | 46058 |
| Beniflá | Beniflá | Beniflà | 484 | 0.62 | 780.64 | València / Valencia | Safor | 46061 |
| Benigànim | Benigánim | Benigànim | 5,716 | 33.44 | 170.93 | València / Valencia | Vall d'Albaida | 46062 |
| Benimodo | Benimodo | | 2,279 | 12.52 | 182.02 | València / Valencia | Ribera Alta | 46063 |
| Benimuslem | Benimuslem | | 665 | 4.17 | 159.47 | València / Valencia | Ribera Alta | 46064 |
| Beniparrell | Beniparrell | | 2,074 | 3.62 | 572.92 | València / Valencia | Horta Sud | 46065 |
| Benirredrà | Benirredrá | Benirredrà | 1,571 | 0.39 | 4,028.20 | València / Valencia | Safor | 46066 |
| Benissanó | Benisanó | Benissanó | 2,385 | 2.25 | 1,060 | València / Valencia | Camp de Túria | 46067 |
| Benissoda | Benisoda | Benissoda | 460 | 4.04 | 113.86 | València / Valencia | Vall d'Albaida | 46068 |
| Benissuera | Benisuera | Benissuera | 185 | 2.12 | 87.26 | València / Valencia | Vall d'Albaida | 46069 |
| Bétera | Bétera | | 26,759 | 75.1 | 356.31 | València / Valencia | Camp de Túria | 46070 |
| Bicorp | Bicorb | Bicorp | 549 | 136.5 | 4.02 | València / Valencia | Canal de Navarrés | 46071 |
| Bocairent | Bocairente | Bocairent | 4,115 | 96.98 | 42.43 | València / Valencia | Vall d'Albaida | 46072 |
| Bolbaite | Bolbaite | Bolbait | 1,334 | 40.39 | 33.02 | València / Valencia | Canal de Navarrés | 46073 |
| Bonrepòs i Mirambell | Bonrepós y Mirambell | Bonrepòs i Mirambell | 3,907 | 1.05 | 3,720.95 | València / Valencia | Horta Nord | 46074 |
| Bufali | Bufali | | 156 | 3.19 | 48.90 | València / Valencia | Vall d'Albaida | 46075 |
| Bugarra | Bugarra | | 783 | 40.31 | 19.42 | València / Valencia | Serranos | 46076 |
| Buñol | Buñol | Bunyol | 9,579 | 112.4 | 85.22 | València / Valencia | Hoya de Buñol | 46077 |
| Burjassot | Burjasot | Burjassot | 39,702 | 3.44 | 11,541.27 | València / Valencia | Horta Nord | 46078 |
| Calles | Calles | | 431 | 64.92 | 6.63 | València / Valencia | Serranos | 46079 |
| Camporrobles | Camporrobles | | 1,181 | 89.5 | 13.19 | València / Valencia | Requena-Utiel | 46080 |
| Canals | Canals | | 13,162 | 21.86 | 602.10 | València / Valencia | Costera | 46081 |
| Canet d'En Berenguer | Canet de Berenguer | Canet d'En Berenguer | 7,265 | 3.95 | 1,839.64 | València / Valencia | Camp de Morvedre | 46082 |
| Carcaixent | Carcagente | Carcaixent | 20,777 | 59.25 | 350.66 | València / Valencia | Ribera Alta | 46083 |
| Càrcer | Cárcer | Càrcer | 1,826 | 7.41 | 246.42 | València / Valencia | Ribera Alta | 46084 |
| Carlet | Carlet | | 16,141 | 45.62 | 353.81 | València / Valencia | Ribera Alta | 46085 |
| Carrícola | Carrícola | | 102 | 4.6 | 22.17 | València / Valencia | Vall d'Albaida | 46086 |
| Casas Altas | Casas Altas | Cases Altes | 146 | 15.95 | 9.15 | València / Valencia | Rincón de Ademuz | 46087 |
| Casas Bajas | Casas Bajas | Cases Baixes | 173 | 22.65 | 7.63 | València / Valencia | Rincón de Ademuz | 46088 |
| Casinos | Casinos | | 3,091 | 41.48 | 74.51 | València / Valencia | Camp de Túria | 46089 |
| Castelló | Villanueva de Castellón | Castelló | 6,891 | 20.3 | 339.45 | València / Valencia | Ribera Alta | 46090 |
| Castelló de Rugat | Castellón de Rugat | Castelló de Rugat | 2,322 | 19.02 | 122.08 | València / Valencia | Vall d'Albaida | 46257 |
| Castellonet de la Conquesta | Castellonet | Castellonet de la Conquesta | 149 | 5.43 | 27.44 | València / Valencia | Safor | 46091 |
| Castielfabib | Castielfabib | Castellfabib | 297 | 106.29 | 2.79 | València / Valencia | Rincón de Ademuz | 46092 |
| Catadau | Catadau | | 2,939 | 35.46 | 82.88 | València / Valencia | Ribera Alta | 46093 |
| Catarroja | Catarroja | | 29,316 | 13.16 | 2,227.65 | València / Valencia | Horta Sud | 46094 |
| Caudete de las Fuentes | Caudete de las Fuentes | | 693 | 34.6 | 20.02 | València / Valencia | Requena-Utiel | 46095 |
| Cerdà | Cerdá | Cerdà | 360 | 1.52 | 236.84 | València / Valencia | Costera | 46096 |
| Chella | Chella | Xella | 2,445 | 43.49 | 56.21 | València / Valencia | Canal de Navarrés | 46107 |
| Chelva | Chelva | Xelva | 1,645 | 190.38 | 8.64 | València / Valencia | Serranos | 46106 |
| Chera | Chera | Xera | 483 | 49.7 | 9.71 | València / Valencia | Requena-Utiel | 46108 |
| Cheste | Cheste | Xest | 8,962 | 71.44 | 125.44 | València / Valencia | Hoya de Buñol | 46109 |
| Chiva | Chiva | Xiva | 16,750 | 178.73 | 93.71 | València / Valencia | Hoya de Buñol | 46111 |
| Chulilla | Chulilla | Xulilla | 687 | 61.78 | 11.12 | València / Valencia | Serranos | 46112 |
| Cofrentes | Cofrentes | Cofrents | 1,130 | 103.18 | 10.95 | València / Valencia | Valle de Ayora | 46097 |
| Corbera | Corbera | | 3,118 | 20.27 | 153.82 | València / Valencia | Ribera Baixa | 46098 |
| Cortes de Pallás | Cortes de Pallás | Cortes de Pallars | 753 | 233.01 | 3.23 | València / Valencia | Valle de Ayora | 46099 |
| Cotes | Cotes | | 314 | 6.33 | 49.60 | València / Valencia | Ribera Alta | 46100 |
| Cullera | Cullera | | 23,753 | 53.82 | 441.34 | València / Valencia | Ribera Baixa | 46105 |
| Daimús | Daimuz | Daimús | 3,348 | 3.15 | 1,062.85 | València / Valencia | Safor | 46113 |
| Domeño | Domeño | Domenyo | 684 | 68.58 | 9.97 | València / Valencia | Serranos | 46114 |
| Dos Aguas | Dos Aguas | Dosaigües | 340 | 121.51 | 2.79 | València / Valencia | Hoya de Buñol | 46115 |
| L'Eliana | La Eliana | L'Eliana | 19,054 | 8.77 | 2,172.63 | València / Valencia | Camp de Túria | 46116 |
| Emperador | Emperador | | 717 | 0.03 | 23,900 | València / Valencia | Horta Nord | 46117 |
| Enguera | Enguera | | 4,718 | 241.75 | 19.51 | València / Valencia | Canal de Navarrés | 46118 |
| L'Énova | Énova | L'Énova | 914 | 7.67 | 119.16 | València / Valencia | Ribera Alta | 46119 |
| Estivella | Estivella | | 1,598 | 20.92 | 76.38 | València / Valencia | Camp de Morvedre | 46120 |
| Estubeny | Estubeny | | 114 | 6.42 | 17.75 | València / Valencia | Costera | 46121 |
| Faura | Faura | | 3,619 | 1.64 | 2,206.70 | València / Valencia | Camp de Morvedre | 46122 |
| Favara | Favara | | 2,664 | 9.45 | 281.90 | València / Valencia | Ribera Baixa | 46123 |
| Foios | Foyos | Foios | 7,641 | 6.48 | 1,179.16 | València / Valencia | Horta Nord | 46126 |
| La Font d'En Carròs | Fuente Encarroz | La Font d'en Carròs | 3,858 | 9.9 | 389.69 | València / Valencia | Safor | 46127 |
| La Font de la Figuera | Fuente la Higuera | La Font de la Figuera | 2,031 | 84.34 | 24.08 | València / Valencia | Comarca | 46128 |
| Fontanars dels Alforins | Fontanares | Fontanars dels Alforins | 951 | 74.69 | 12.73 | València / Valencia | Vall d'Albaida | 46124 |
| Fortaleny | Fortaleny | | 1,004 | 4.57 | 219.69 | València / Valencia | Ribera Baixa | 46125 |
| Fuenterrobles | Fuenterrobles | | 688 | 49.45 | 13.91 | València / Valencia | Requena-Utiel | 46129 |
| Gandia | Gandía | Gandia | 78,108 | 60.83 | 1,284.03 | València / Valencia | Safor | 46131 |
| Gátova | Gátova | Gàtova | 410 | 30.42 | 13.47 | València / Valencia | Camp de Túria | 46902 |
| Gavarda | Gavarda | | 1,058 | 7.99 | 132.41 | València / Valencia | Ribera Alta | 46130 |
| El Genovés | Genovés | El Genovés | 2,778 | 15.16 | 183.24 | València / Valencia | Costera | 46132 |
| Gestalgar | Gestalgar | | 569 | 69.73 | 8.16 | València / Valencia | Serranos | 46133 |
| Gilet | Gilet | | 3,818 | 11.28 | 338.47 | València / Valencia | Camp de Morvedre | 46134 |
| Godella | Godella | | 13,414 | 8.4 | 1,596.90 | València / Valencia | Horta Nord | 46135 |
| Godelleta | Godelleta | | 4,148 | 37.45 | 110.76 | València / Valencia | Hoya de Buñol | 46136 |
| La Granja de la Costera | La Granja de la Costera | | 288 | 0.83 | 346.98 | València / Valencia | Costera | 46137 |
| Guadasséquies | Guadasequies | Guadasséquies | 480 | 3.26 | 147.23 | València / Valencia | Vall d'Albaida | 46138 |
| Guadassuar | Guadasuar | Guadassuar | 5,961 | 35.29 | 168.91 | València / Valencia | Ribera Alta | 46139 |
| Guardamar de la Safor | Guardamar de la Safor | | 605 | 1.1 | 550 | València / Valencia | Safor | 46140 |
| Higueruelas | Higueruelas | Figueroles de Domenyo | 522 | 18.99 | 27.48 | València / Valencia | Serranos | 46141 |
| Jalance | Jalance | Xalans | 810 | 94.77 | 8.54 | València / Valencia | Valle de Ayora | 46142 |
| Jarafuel | Jarafuel | Xarafull | 765 | 103.09 | 7.42 | València / Valencia | Valle de Ayora | 46144 |
| Llanera de Ranes | Llanera de Ranes | | 1,054 | 9.27 | 113.70 | València / Valencia | Costera | 46154 |
| Llaurí | Llaurí | | 1,208 | 13.63 | 88.62 | València / Valencia | Ribera Baixa | 46155 |
| Llíria | Liria | Llíria | 24,518 | 228.04 | 107.51 | València / Valencia | Camp de Túria | 46147 |
| Llocnou de la Corona | Lugar Nuevo de la Corona | Llocnou de la Corona | 124 | 0.04 | 3,100 | València / Valencia | Horta Sud | 46152 |
| Llocnou de Sant Jeroni | Lugar Nuevo de San Jerónimo | Llocnou de Sant Jeroni | 567 | 6.47 | 87.63 | València / Valencia | Safor | 46153 |
| Llocnou d'En Fenollet | Lugar Nuevo de Fenollet | Llocnou d'En Fenollet | 908 | 1.53 | 593.46 | València / Valencia | Costera | 46151 |
| Llombai | Llombay | Llombai | 2,687 | 55.57 | 48.35 | València / Valencia | Ribera Alta | 46156 |
| La Llosa de Ranes | Llosa de Ranes | La Llosa del Ranes | 3,681 | 7.13 | 516.26 | València / Valencia | Costera | 46157 |
| Llutxent | Luchente | Llutxent | 2,324 | 40.12 | 57.92 | València / Valencia | Vall d'Albaida | 46150 |
| Loriguilla | Loriguilla | | 2,171 | 72.42 | 29.97 | València / Valencia | Camp de Túria | 46148 |
| Losa del Obispo | La Losa del Obispo | La Llosa del Bisbe | 520 | 12.17 | 42.72 | València / Valencia | Serranos | 46149 |
| Macastre | Macastre | | 1,437 | 37.66 | 38.15 | València / Valencia | Hoya de Buñol | 46158 |
| Manises | Manises | | 31,573 | 19.65 | 1,606.76 | València / Valencia | Horta Oest | 46159 |
| Manuel | Manuel | | 2,500 | 6.05 | 413.22 | València / Valencia | Ribera Alta | 46160 |
| Marines | Marines | | 1,955 | 35.72 | 54.73 | València / Valencia | Camp de Túria | 46161 |
| Massalavés | Masalavés | Massalavés | 1,739 | 7.48 | 232.48 | València / Valencia | Ribera Alta | 46162 |
| Massalfassar | Masalfasar | Massalfassar | 2,609 | 2.56 | 1,019.14 | València / Valencia | Horta Nord | 46163 |
| Massamagrell | Masamagrell | Massamagrell | 16,766 | 6.16 | 2,721.75 | València / Valencia | Horta Nord | 46164 |
| Massanassa | Masanasa | Massanassa | 10,146 | 5.59 | 1,815.02 | València / Valencia | Horta Sud | 46165 |
| Meliana | Meliana | | 10,918 | 4.73 | 2,308.24 | València / Valencia | Horta Nord | 46166 |
| Millares | Millares | | 330 | 105.51 | 3.12 | València / Valencia | Canal de Navarrés | 46167 |
| Miramar | Miramar | | 2,978 | 2.56 | 1,163.28 | València / Valencia | Safor | 46168 |
| Mislata | Mislata | | 45,644 | 2.03 | 22,397.04 | València / Valencia | Horta Oest | 46169 |
| Moixent / Mogente | Mogente | Moixent | 4,383 | 150.23 | 29.17 | València / Valencia | Costera | 46170 |
| Moncada | Moncada | Montcada | 22,067 | 15.83 | 1,393.99 | València / Valencia | Horta Nord | 46171 |
| Montaverner | Montaberner | Montaverner | 1,617 | 7.4 | 218.51 | València / Valencia | Vall d'Albaida | 46173 |
| Montesa | Montesa | | 1,132 | 48.11 | 23.52 | València / Valencia | Costera | 46174 |
| Montitxelvo / Montichelvo | Montichelvo | Montitxelvo | 558 | 8.16 | 68.38 | València / Valencia | Vall d'Albaida | 46175 |
| Montroi / Montroy | Montroy | Montroi | 3,295 | 31.39 | 104.96 | València / Valencia | Ribera Alta | 46176 |
| Montserrat | Monserrat | Montserrat | 9,312 | 45.58 | 204.30 | València / Valencia | Ribera Alta | 46172 |
| Museros | Museros | | 6,741 | 12.45 | 541.44 | València / Valencia | Horta Nord | 46177 |
| Nàquera / Náquera | Náquera | Nàquera | 8,102 | 38.72 | 209.24 | València / Valencia | Camp de Túria | 46178 |
| Navarrés | Navarrés | | 3,061 | 47.04 | 65.07 | València / Valencia | Canal de Navarrés | 46179 |
| Novetlè / Novelé | Novelé | Novetlè | 856 | 1.47 | 582.31 | València / Valencia | Costera | 46180 |
| Oliva | Oliva | | 25,558 | 59.93 | 426.46 | València / Valencia | Safor | 46181 |
| L'Olleria | Ollería | L'Olleria | 8,421 | 32.22 | 261.35 | València / Valencia | Vall d'Albaida | 46183 |
| Olocau | Olocau | | 2,303 | 37.4 | 61.57 | València / Valencia | Camp de Túria | 46182 |
| Ontinyent | Onteniente | Ontinyent | 36,194 | 125.43 | 288.55 | València / Valencia | Vall d'Albaida | 46184 |
| Otos | Otos | | 436 | 11.07 | 39.38 | València / Valencia | Vall d'Albaida | 46185 |
| Paiporta | Paiporta | | 27,184 | 3.96 | 6,864.64 | València / Valencia | Horta Sud | 46186 |
| Palma de Gandía | Palma de Gandía | Palma de Gandia | 1,735 | 13.92 | 124.64 | València / Valencia | Safor | 46187 |
| Palmera | Palmera | | 1,043 | 0.98 | 1,064.28 | València / Valencia | Safor | 46188 |
| El Palomar | El Palomar | | 574 | 7.76 | 73.96 | València / Valencia | Vall d'Albaida | 46189 |
| Paterna | Paterna | | 73,488 | 35.85 | 2,049.87 | València / Valencia | Horta Oest | 46190 |
| Pedralba | Pedralba | | 3,048 | 58.85 | 51.79 | València / Valencia | Serranos | 46191 |
| Petrés | Petrés | | 1,096 | 1.87 | 586.09 | València / Valencia | Camp de Morvedre | 46192 |
| Picanya | Picaña | Picanya | 11,760 | 7.2 | 1,633.33 | València / Valencia | Horta Oest | 46193 |
| Picassent | Picasent | Picassent | 22,236 | 85.79 | 259.19 | València / Valencia | Horta Sud | 46194 |
| Piles | Piles | | 3,031 | 3.94 | 769.28 | València / Valencia | Safor | 46195 |
| Pinet | Pinet | | 155 | 11.89 | 13.03 | València / Valencia | Vall d'Albaida | 46196 |
| La Pobla de Farnals | Puebla de Farnals | La Pobla de Farnals | 8,699 | 3.62 | 2,403.03 | València / Valencia | Horta Nord | 46199 |
| La Pobla de Vallbona | Puebla de Vallbona | La Pobla de Vallbona | 26,435 | 33.1 | 798.64 | València / Valencia | Camp de Túria | 46202 |
| La Pobla del Duc | Puebla del Duc | La Pobla del Duc | 2,438 | 18.87 | 129.19 | València / Valencia | Vall d'Albaida | 46200 |
| La Pobla Llarga | Puebla Larga | La Pobla Llarga | 4,529 | 10.09 | 448.86 | València / Valencia | Ribera Alta | 46203 |
| Polinyà de Xúquer | Poliñá de Júcar | Polinyà de Xúquer | 2,550 | 9.18 | 277.77 | València / Valencia | Ribera Baixa | 46197 |
| Potries | Potríes | Potries | 1,080 | 3.07 | 351.79 | València / Valencia | Safor | 46198 |
| Puçol | Puzol | Puçol | 20,731 | 18.1 | 1,145.35 | València / Valencia | Horta Nord | 46205 |
| Puebla de San Miguel | Puebla de San Miguel | La Pobla de Sant Miquel | 53 | 63.58 | 0.83 | València / Valencia | Rincón de Ademuz | 46201 |
| El Puig de Santa Maria | El Puig de Santa María | El Puig de Santa Maria | 8,992 | 26.8 | 335.52 | València / Valencia | Horta Nord | 46204 |
| Quart de les Valls | Cuart de les Valls | Quart de les Valls | 1,050 | 8.43 | 124.55 | València / Valencia | Camp de Morvedre | 46101 |
| Quart de Poblet | Cuart de Poblet | Quart de Poblet | 25,590 | 19.72 | 1,297.66 | València / Valencia | Horta Oest | 46102 |
| Quartell | Cuartell | Quartell | 1,672 | 3.18 | 525.78 | València / Valencia | Camp de Morvedre | 46103 |
| Quatretonda | Cuatretonda | Quatretonda | 2,190 | 43.45 | 50.40 | València / Valencia | Vall d'Albaida | 46104 |
| Quesa | Quesa | | 661 | 73.16 | 9.03 | València / Valencia | Canal de Navarrés | 46206 |
| Rafelbunyol | Rafelbuñol | Rafelbunyol | 9,467 | 4.2 | 2,254.04 | València / Valencia | Horta Nord | 46207 |
| Rafelcofer | Rafelcofer | | 1,372 | 2.03 | 675.86 | València / Valencia | Safor | 46208 |
| Rafelguaraf | Rafelguaraf | | 2,351 | 16.26 | 144.58 | València / Valencia | Ribera Alta | 46209 |
| Ráfol de Salem | Ráfol de Salem | El Ràfol de Salem | 467 | 4.33 | 107.85 | València / Valencia | Vall d'Albaida | 46210 |
| Real | Real | | 2,410 | 18.32 | 131.55 | València / Valencia | Ribera Alta | 46212 |
| El Real de Gandia | Real de Gandía | El Real de Gandia | 2,649 | 6.07 | 436.40 | València / Valencia | Safor | 46211 |
| Requena | Requena | | 20,387 | 814.4 | 25.03 | València / Valencia | Requena-Utiel | 46213 |
| Riba-roja de Túria | Ribarroja del Turia | Riba-roja de Túria | 23,555 | 57.49 | 409.72 | València / Valencia | Camp de Túria | 46214 |
| Riola | Riola | | 1,780 | 5.59 | 318.42 | Valencia / València | Ribera Baixa | 46215 |
| Rocafort | Rocafort | | 7,570 | 2.34 | 3,235.04 | València / Valencia | Horta Nord | 46216 |
| Rotglà i Corberà | Rotglá y Corbera | | 1,165 | 6.26 | 186.10 | València / Valencia | Costera | 46217 |
| Ròtova | Rótova | Ròtova | 1,292 | 7.66 | 168.66 | València / Valencia | Safor | 46218 |
| Rugat | Rugat | | 166 | 3.2 | 51.87 | València / Valencia | Vall d'Albaida | 46219 |
| Sagunt / Sagunto | Sagunto | Sagunt | 70,128 | 133.92 | 523.65 | València / Valencia | Camp de Morvedre | 46220 |
| Salem | Salem | | 401 | 8.61 | 46.57 | València / Valencia | Vall d'Albaida | 46221 |
| San Antonio de Benagéber | San Antonio de Benagéber | Sant Antoni de Benaixeve | 10,200 | 8.74 | 1,167.04 | València / Valencia | Camp de Túria | 46903 |
| Sant Joanet | San Juan de Énova | Sant Joanet | 544 | 1.86 | 292.47 | València / Valencia | Ribera Alta | 46222 |
| Sedaví | Sedaví | | 10,637 | 1.83 | 5,812.56 | València / Valencia | Horta Sud | 46223 |
| Segart | Segart | | 166 | 6.64 | 25 | València / Valencia | Camp de Morvedre | 46224 |
| Sellent | Sellent | | 381 | 14.01 | 27.19 | València / Valencia | Ribera Alta | 46225 |
| Sempere | Sempere | | 31 | 3.83 | 8.09 | València / Valencia | Vall d'Albaida | 46226 |
| Senyera | Señera | Senyera | 1,122 | 2.03 | 552.70 | València / Valencia | Ribera Alta | 46227 |
| Serra | Serra | | 3,608 | 57.29 | 62.97 | València / Valencia | Camp de Túria | 46228 |
| Siete Aguas | Siete Aguas | Setaigües | 1,229 | 110.59 | 11.11 | València / Valencia | Hoya de Buñol | 46229 |
| Silla | Silla | | 19,683 | 25.02 | 786.69 | València / Valencia | Horta Sud | 46230 |
| Simat de la Valldigna | Simat de Valldigna | Simat de la Valldigna | 3,251 | 38.49 | 84.46 | València / Valencia | Safor | 46231 |
| Sinarcas | Sinarcas | | 1,113 | 102.46 | 10.86 | València / Valencia | Requena-Utiel | 46232 |
| Sollana | Sollana | | 4,959 | 39.23 | 126.40 | València / Valencia | Ribera Baixa | 46233 |
| Sot de Chera | Sot de Chera | Sot de Xera | 423 | 38.75 | 10.91 | València / Valencia | Serranos | 46234 |
| Sueca | Sueca | | 28,086 | 92.52 | 303.56 | València / Valencia | Ribera Baixa | 46235 |
| Sumacàrcer | Sumacárcel | Sumacàrcer | 1,062 | 20.09 | 52.86 | València / Valencia | Ribera Alta | 46236 |
| Tavernes Blanques | Tabernes Blanques | Tavernes Blanques | 9,456 | 0.74 | 12,778.37 | València / Valencia | Horta Nord | 46237 |
| Tavernes de la Valldigna | Tabernes de Valldigna | Tavernes de la Valldigna | 17,443 | 49.23 | 354.31 | València / Valencia | Safor | 46238 |
| Teresa de Cofrentes | Teresa de Cofrentes | Teresa de Cofrents | 611 | 110.8 | 5.51 | València / Valencia | Valle de Ayora | 46239 |
| Terrateig | Terrateig | | 291 | 6.32 | 46.04 | València / Valencia | Vall d'Albaida | 46240 |
| Titaguas | Titaguas | Titaigües | 505 | 63.21 | 7.98 | València / Valencia | Serranos | 46241 |
| Torrebaja | Torrebaja | Torrebaixa | 404 | 4.72 | 85.59 | València / Valencia | Rincón de Ademuz | 46242 |
| Torrella | Torrella | | 143 | 1.14 | 125.43 | València / Valencia | Costera | 46243 |
| Torrent | Torrente | Torrent | 87,295 | 69.23 | 1,260.94 | València / Valencia | Horta Oest | 46244 |
| Torres Torres | Torres Torres | | 745 | 11.77 | 63.29 | València / Valencia | Camp de Morvedre | 46245 |
| Tous | Tous | | 1,352 | 127.52 | 10.60 | València / Valencia | Ribera Alta | 46246 |
| Tuéjar | Tuéjar | Toixa | 1,201 | 121.92 | 9.85 | València / Valencia | Serranos | 46247 |
| Turís | Turís | | 7,259 | 80.51 | 90.16 | València / Valencia | Ribera Alta | 46248 |
| Utiel | Utiel | | 11,632 | 236.91 | 49.09 | València / Valencia | Requena-Utiel | 46249 |
| València | Valencia | València | 807,693 | 139.31 | 5,797.81 | València / Valencia | Horta de València | 46250 |
| Vallada | Vallada | | 3,063 | 61.5 | 49.80 | València / Valencia | Costera | 46251 |
| Vallanca | Vallanca | | 144 | 56.61 | 2.54 | València / Valencia | Rincón de Ademuz | 46252 |
| Vallés | Vallés | | 151 | 1,24 | 121.77 | València / Valencia | Costera | 46253 |
| Venta del Moro | Venta del Moro | | 1,164 | 272.19 | 4.27 | València / Valencia | Requena-Utiel | 46254 |
| Vilallonga / Villalonga | Villalonga | Vilallonga | 4,667 | 43.32 | 107.73 | València / Valencia | Safor | 46255 |
| Vilamarxant | Villamarchante | Vilamarxant | 10,772 | 71.08 | 151.54 | València / Valencia | Camp de Túria | 46256 |
| Villar del Arzobispo | Villar del Arzobispo | El Villar | 3,700 | 40.7 | 90.90 | València / Valencia | Serranos | 46258 |
| Villargordo del Cabriel | Villargordo del Cabriel | | 577 | 71.61 | 8.05 | València / Valencia | Requena-Utiel | 46259 |
| Vinalesa | Vinalesa | | 3,495 | 1.53 | 2,284.31 | València / Valencia | Horta Nord | 46260 |
| Xàtiva | Játiva | Xàtiva | 30,072 | 76.56 | 392.78 | València / Valencia | Costera | 46145 |
| Xeraco | Jaraco | Xeraco | 5,923 | 20.22 | 292.92 | València / Valencia | Safor | 46143 |
| Xeresa | Jeresa | Xeresa | 2,263 | 16.85 | 134.30 | València / Valencia | Safor | 46146 |
| Xirivella | Chirivella | Xirivella | 30,749 | 5.13 | 5,993.95 | València / Valencia | Horta Oest | 46110 |
| Yátova | Yátova | Iàtova | 2,205 | 129.24 | 17.06 | València / Valencia | Hoya de Buñol | 46261 |
| La Yesa | La Yesa | La Iessa | 235 | 84.68 | 2.77 | València / Valencia | Serranos | 46262 |
| Zarra | Zarra | | 364 | 49.72 | 7.32 | València / Valencia | Valle de Ayora | 46263 |

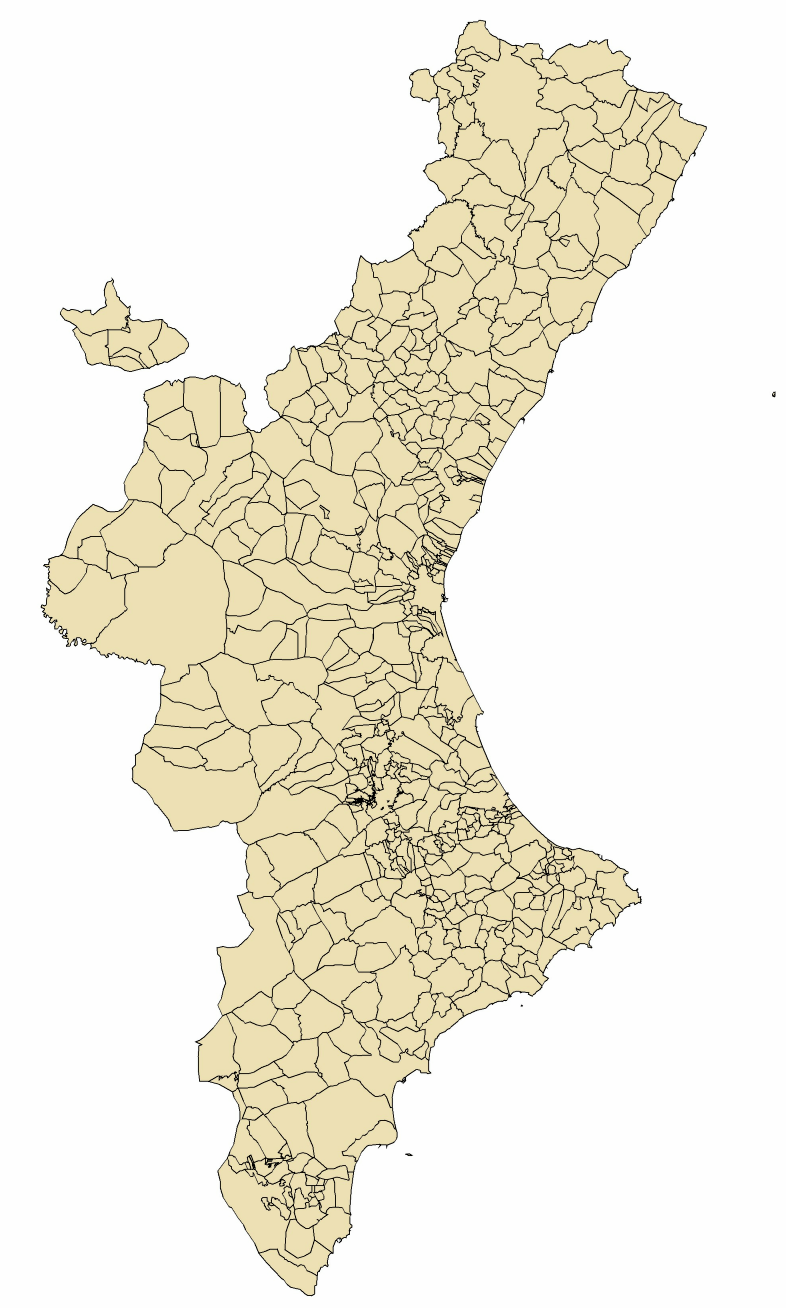
Municipalities of the Valencian Community

== Provincial lists ==
The following links are to lists which are more detailed province-specific, and all municipalities in a given province are ranked by population.

- List of municipalities in Alicante
- List of municipalities in Castellón
- List of municipalities in Valencia

== See also ==
- Comarques of the Valencian Community

== Bibliography ==
- Corpus Toponímic Valencià. Acadèmia Valenciana de la Llengua. 2009, València.
