= Cinctorres =

- Municipality
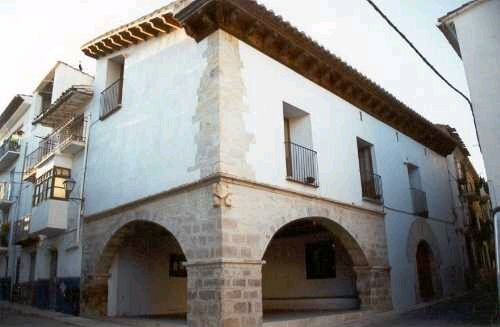
- Town Hall.

- Coat of arms

- Location in Spain
- Coordinates: 40°35′N 0°13′W
- Country: Spain
- Autonomous community: Valencian Community
- Province: Castellón
- Comarca: Ports
- Judicial district: Vinaròs

Government
  - Mayor: Antonio Ripollés Ortí (2007) (PSOE)

Area
  - Total: 34.9 km^{2} (13.5 sq mi)
- Elevation: 907 m (2,976 ft)

Population (2025-01-01)
  - Total: 433
  - Density: 12.4/km^{2} (32.1/sq mi)
- Demonym: Cinctorrà
- Time zone: UTC+1 (CET)
  - Summer (DST): UTC+2 (CEST)
- Postal code: 12318
- Official language(s): Valencian
- Website: Official website

Cinctorres is a town in the province of Castellón, Valencian Community, Spain, pertaining to the region of the Ports of Morella. As of 2009, it has 498 inhabitants.

== Geography ==
The municipality is located in a small plateau between Monte Bovalar and the valley of Caldes river. Thanks to its position, the city offers spectacular landscaping views. It is not uncommon to see the flight of vultures, which nest in the environs of the nearby rocks.

=== Bordering towns ===
Todolella, La Mata de Morella, Portell de Morella, Castellfort, Morella and Forcall, all in the province of Castellón.

== Main sights ==
- Hermitages of St. Mark (16th century) and St. Peter Martyr (17th century)
- Parish church of St. Peter the Apostle (18th century), in Baroque style
- Torre dels Moros ("Moorish Tower")
- Late-Gothic Town Hall (16th century)
- Palace of St. John (17th century)
- Old Hospital (16th century), housing a permanent collection of fossils and historical daily life tools

== See also ==
- List of municipalities in Castellón

== Economy ==
The main economic activity, like in other neighbouring localities, is the cattle ranch, in particular pig cattle. In the last few years, due to the growing importance acquired by the interior tourism, there has been an increase of rural lodgings, as a complement to the agrarian activity. Construction and service companies are also growing in importance.
