= Els Ports =

Els Ports may refer to any of the following:

- Ports (comarca)
- Ports de Tortosa-Beseit
- Ports de Morella

== See also ==
- Ports (disambiguation)
