= Herbes =

Herbes may refer to:

- Herbés, a municipality in Castellón, Valencian Community, Spain.
- Herbes de Mallorca, the Catalan name for Herbs de Majorca
