= Ports de Morella =

Coordinates: 40°37′24″N 0°4′22.02″E

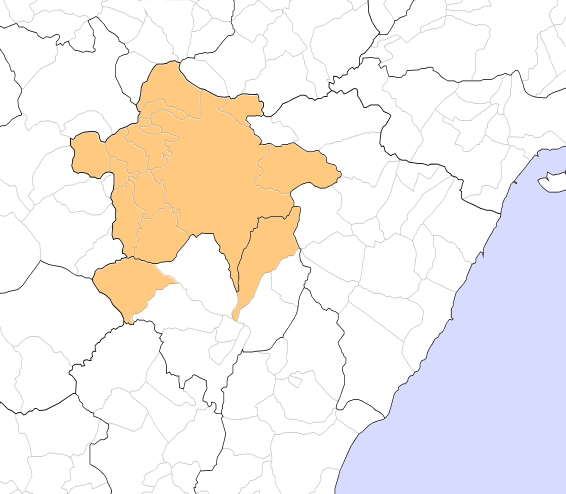
Map of the historical extent of the Ports de Morella according to Emili Beüt

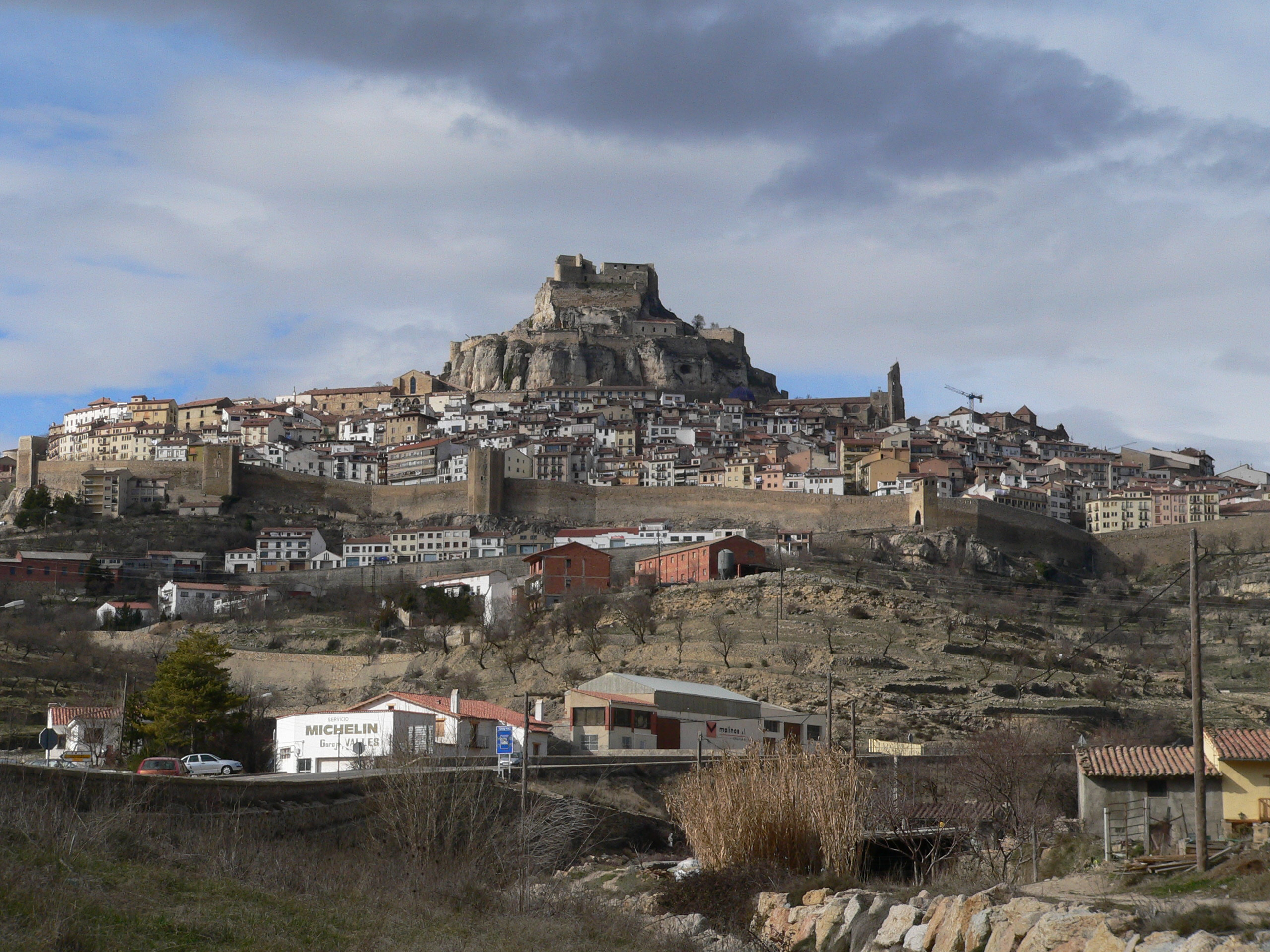
View of Morella

Ports de Morella (Spanish: Los Puertos de Morella) is a historical Valencian comarca. It takes its name from the city of Morella, its capital and the only place in the region having been granted the title of 'city'.

It mostly overlaps with the present-day Ports comarca except for the municipal areas surrounding Catí and Vilafranca that were excluded from the present-day Ports administrative division.

== See also ==
- Maestrat
- Tinença de Benifassà

== Bibliography ==
- Juan Piqueras, Geografia de les comarques valencianes, Foro Ediciones SL, Valencia 1995. ISBN 84-8186-018-2
- Mª José Ribera Ortún & Bernardí Cabrer Borrás, Los desequilibrios espaciales: Una comarcalización del Pais Valenciano. Ed. Institut de Estudios de Administración Local. Valencia, 1979.
