= Vilafranca =

- Municipality
- Villafranca del Cid
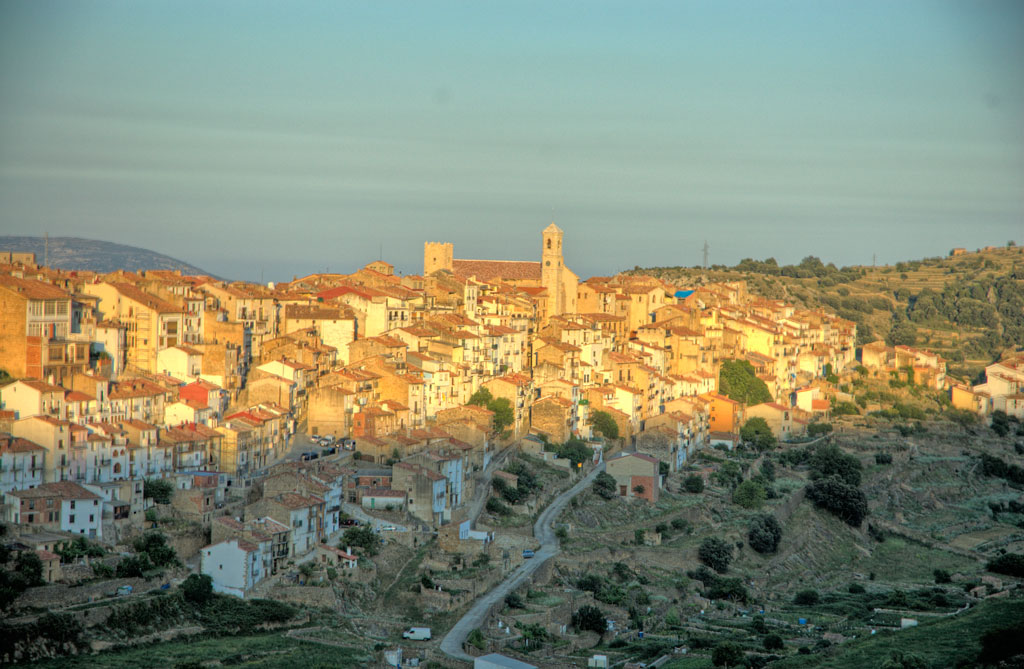

- Coat of arms

- Location in Spain
- Coordinates: 40°25′30″N 0°15′21″W
- Country: Spain
- Autonomous community: Valencian Community
- Province: Castellón
- Comarca: Ports
- Judicial district: Castellón de la Plana

Government
  - Alcalde: Oscar Tena García (PSOE)

Area
  - Total: 93.8 km^{2} (36.2 sq mi)
- Elevation: 1,125 m (3,691 ft)

Population (2025-01-01)
  - Total: 2,115
  - Density: 22.5/km^{2} (58.4/sq mi)
- Demonym(s): Vilafranquí, Vilafranquina
- Time zone: UTC+1 (CET)
  - Summer (DST): UTC+2 (CEST)
- Postal code: 12150
- Official language(s): Valencian and Spanish
- Website: Official website

Vilafranca is a municipality in the comarca of Ports, in the province of Castellón, Valencian Community, Spain. Prior to 2022, it was part of a different comarca, l'Alt Maestrat. Its official Spanish language name is Villafranca del Cid.

== Geography ==
The royal town of Villafranca del Cid is situated on the western boundary of the province of Castellón, 95 km (59 mi) from the capital. The village lies on a high plateau at 1,125 meters (3,691 ft) above sea level. Despite this, the rest of the area is very rugged, most notably the main high points of Tossal dels Montllats (1,643 m (5,390 ft)), Tossal del Mas de Coder (1,467 m (4,813 ft)), Tossal del Mas d'Altava (1,426 m (4,678 ft)), Tossal del Mas de Tosca de Dalt (1,379 m (4,524 ft)), Tossal d'Arriello (1,314 m (4,311 ft)) and the side of Canto del Picaio (1,305 m (4,281 ft)). By contrast the lower part is in the Río Monleón, 710 m (2,330 ft) above sea level. The highest points are basically formed by limestone erosion that has beveled, sometimes deeply. The dissolution of limestone has created some whimsical-looking formations in Les Coves del Forcall.

The town can be reached from Castellón via the CV-10 and the CV-15.

=== Neighboring localities ===
The town of Villafranca del Cid is bordered by the following locations: Portell de Morella, Castellfort, Ares del Maestrat, Benassal and Vistabella del Maestrat all within the province of Castellón, and Mosqueruela and La Iglesuela del Cid in the province of Teruel.

== History ==
The town's prehistoric origins are unknown. So say the town of Bronze Age of "Ereta Castellar" numerous Iberian sites that dot the term, occasional rock paintings and historically remains Roman found (old secondary roads, imperial coins, etc.). The birth of the current Vilafranca is officially dated February 7, 1239. Its founder was Don Blasco de Alagon, who called the town Rivus Truitarum or Riu de les Truites (Rio de las Truchas in Castilian). The king Jaime I crossed the Gothic-Roman bridge across the Riu de les Truites to first set foot on the land of Castellon.

After belonging to the house of Alagon, then Anglesola and again back to Alagon, the town joined the Términos Generales del Castillo de Morella on May 14, 1303. On December 27, 1333, the people from Vilafranca rebelled against the decisions of Morella's juries, beginning the struggle for independence that lasted nearly four centuries and other villages joined.

There were a number of lawsuits with Mosqueruela losing Mallo castle and the village of Estrella between 1335 and 1340.

King Pedro IV of Aragon authorized the construction of walls and granted independence to Morella on June 8, 1358; but eleven years later he changed his mind and canceled the privilege. Felipe IV understood the financial burden this posed to the villages, and in payment for services rendered by the villagers in the wars of France and Catalonia, the independent will.

Joan Baptista Penyarroja of Carlos II was the notary who succeeded in gaining the independence of all the villages and the erection in royal villas February 8, 1691.

In the War of the Spanish Succession, the town took the side of Archduke Charles of Austria.

Although there was always an important traditionalist core and a native son, the famous guerrilla "El Serrador", sided with liberals loyal to Elizabeth II, but Cabrera took her by surprise in 1834. Then it was another strong liberal stronghold again until being abandoned, as it was trapped between the Carlist domains. In the area of the town, two memorable battles were fought: the Mas de la Carrasca and Pla de Mosorro on June 28, 1875, won by Jovellar, Azcarraga and Villaviciosa against Dorregaray, Cucala and Villalaín (who died in action). This battle has been considered as the beginning of the end of the war in the centre of Spain and Valencia.

In 1943 the provincial council (diputación provincial) voted for the mayor of Vilafranca, Juan Antonio Aznar Inigo, for the position of procurador (member of the Cortes) in the I Legislature of the Cortes Españolas (1943-1946), representing the municipalities of the province.
