= Zorita del Maestrazgo =

- Municipality and town
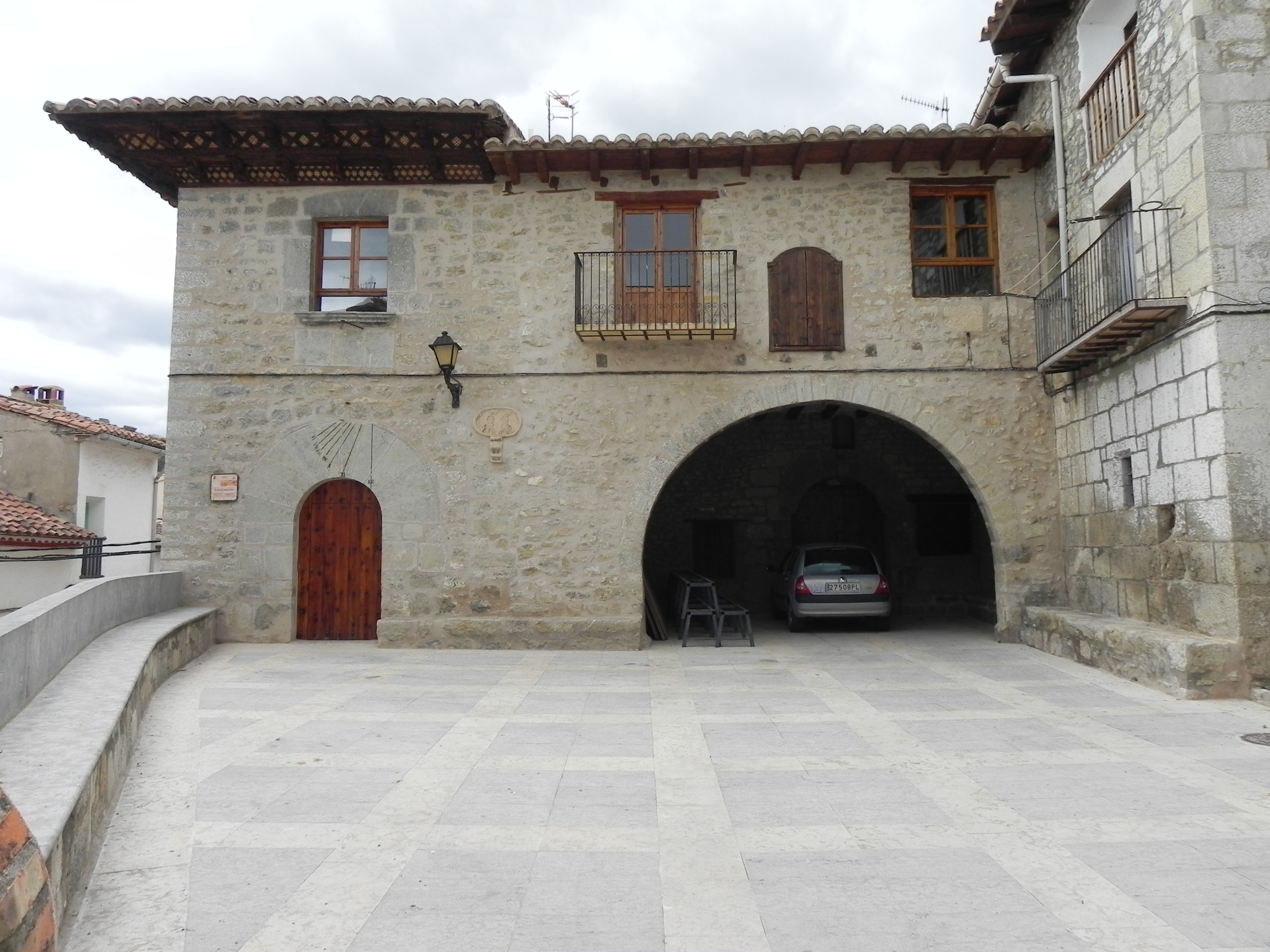
- Town hall

- Flag Coat of arms
- Interactive map of Zorita del Maestrazgo
- Coordinates: 40°43′42″N 0°09′58″W
- Country: Spain
- Autonomous community: Valencian Community
- Province: Castellón
- Comarca: Ports

Area
  - Total: 68.8 km^{2} (26.6 sq mi)
- Elevation: 661 m (2,169 ft)

Population (2025-01-01)
  - Total: 118
  - Density: 1.72/km^{2} (4.44/sq mi)
- Time zone: UTC+1 (CET)
  - Summer (DST): UTC+2 (CEST)
- Postal code: 12311
- Website: http://www.zoritadelmaestrazgo.es

Zorita del Maestrazgo (Valencian: Sorita) is a municipality located in the province of Castellón, Valencian Community, Spain.
