= María Egual =

Spanish poet and dramatist (1655–1735)

Ana Maria Josepa Dorotea Egual i Miguel (Castellón, January 1655 - Valencia, 23 April 1735), daughter of José Egual Borrás and Basilia Miguel, was a Spanish poet and dramatist. In 1676, she married Chrysostom Peris, Marquess of Castellfort, and moved to Valencia, where she convened literary academies. At the time of her death, almost all her work was destroyed, but some plays and various poems were saved.

== Biography ==
Maria Egual spent her youth in Castellón and married Chrysostom Peris (first Marquis of Xínquer, and then of Castellfort). She held a literary academy in her home in Valencia. She wrote poetry, plays and narratives before her death. Her work was destroyed at the time of her death, although three volumes were conserved. Her literature is of a late Baroque style. She cultivated several poetic models, such as the paradramàtics colloquis.

== Selected works ==
- El esclavo de su dama.
- Los triunfos de Tesalia.
- Triunfos de amor en el aire.

== Bibliography ==
- María Egual, Poesías de la marquesa doña María Egual y Miguel, marquesa de Castellfort.
- Pasqual Mas y Javier Vellón (1997), La literatura barroca en Castellón. María Egual. Obra Completa. Sociedad Castellonense de Cultura.
