= Villores =

- Municipality and town
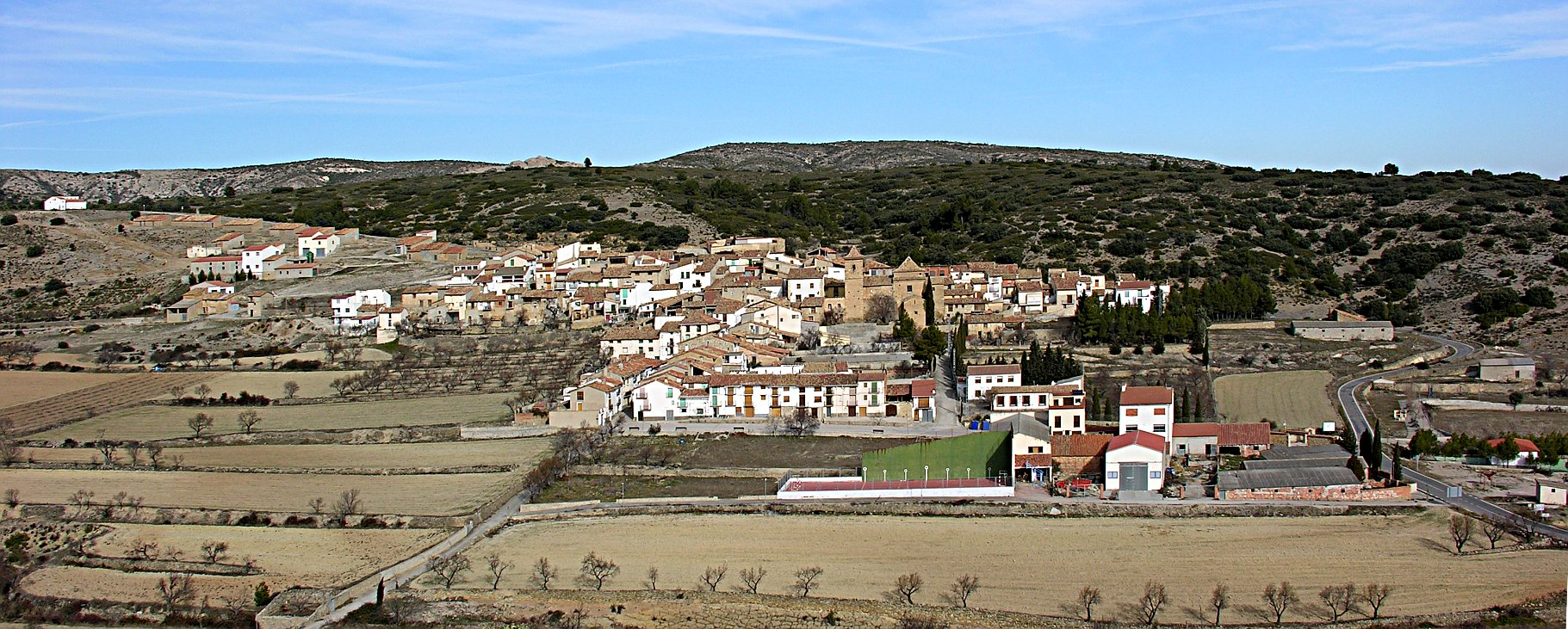

- Flag Coat of arms
- Interactive map of Villores
- Coordinates: 40°40′33″N 0°12′03″W
- Country: Spain
- Autonomous community: Valencian Community
- Province: Castellón
- Comarca: Ports

Area
  - Total: 5.31 km^{2} (2.05 sq mi)
- Elevation: 661 m (2,169 ft)

Population (2025-01-01)
  - Total: 51
  - Density: 9.6/km^{2} (25/sq mi)
- Time zone: UTC+1 (CET)
  - Summer (DST): UTC+2 (CEST)
- Postal code: 12311
- Website: https://www.villores.es

Villores is a municipality located in the province of Castelló, Valencian Country.
