= Castellfort =

- Town and municipality
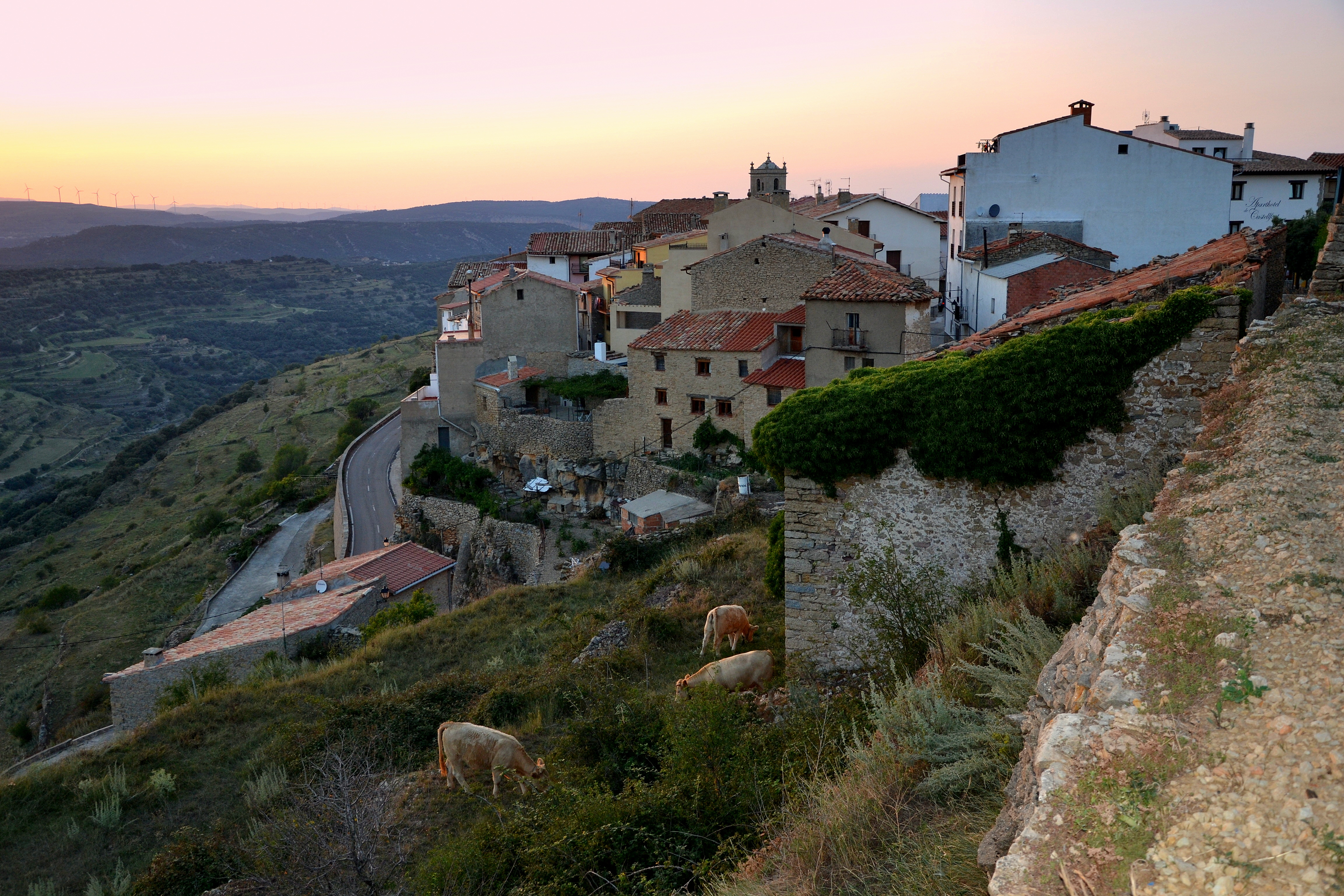

- Coat of arms
- Interactive map of Castellfort
- Coordinates: 40°30′9″N 0°11′29″W
- Country: Spain
- Autonomous community: Valencian Community
- Province: Castellón
- Comarca: Ports

Area
  - Total: 66.70 km^{2} (25.75 sq mi)
- Elevation: 1,180 m (3,870 ft)

Population (2025-01-01)
  - Total: 178
  - Density: 2.67/km^{2} (6.91/sq mi)
- Time zone: UTC+1 (CET)
  - Summer (DST): UTC+2 (CEST)
- Postal code: 12159
- Website: http://www.castellfort.es

Castellfort is a municipality located in the province of Castellón, Valencian Community, Spain, in the mountainous region of Els Ports. It has a population of approximately 238 people.

== Notable people ==
- María Egual (1655-1735), poet and dramatist; marchioness of Castellfort

== See also ==
- List of municipalities in Castellón
