= Olocau del Rey =

Olocau del Rey Olocau del Rei
- Municipality and town
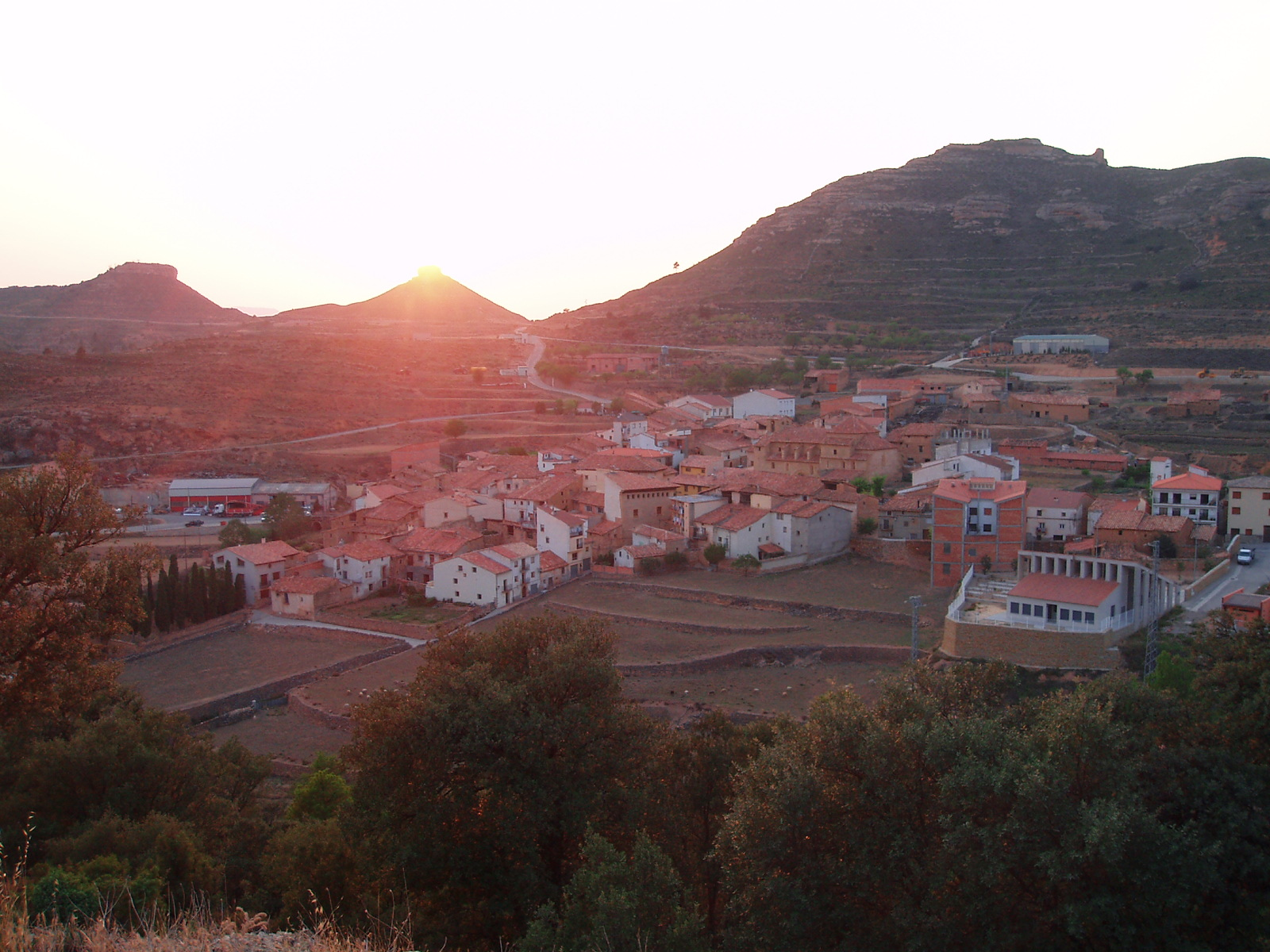

- Coat of arms

- Location of Olocau del Rey in Spain Olocau del Rey (Valencian Community) Olocau del Rey (Spain)
- Coordinates: 40°38′16.72″N 0°20′24.94″W
- Country: Spain
- Autonomous community: Valencian Community
- Province: Castellón
- Comarca: Els Ports

Area
  - Total: 43.98 km^{2} (16.98 sq mi)
- Elevation: 1,042 m (3,419 ft)

Population (2025-01-01)
  - Total: 135
  - Density: 3.07/km^{2} (7.95/sq mi)
- Time zone: UTC+1 (CET)
  - Summer (DST): UTC+2 (CEST)
- Postal code: 12312
- Official language(s): Spanish
- Website: http://www.olocaudelrey.es

Olocau del Rey is a municipality located in the province of Castellón, Valencian Community, Spain.
