= Forcall =

- Municipality and town
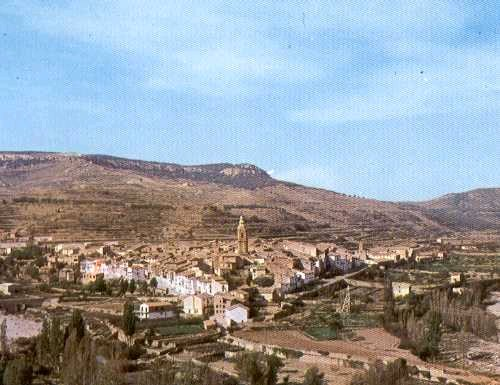

- Coat of arms
- Interactive map of Forcall
- Coordinates: 40°39′N 0°12′W
- Country: Spain
- Autonomous community: Valencian Community
- Province: Castellón
- Comarca: Ports

Area
  - Total: 39.2 km^{2} (15.1 sq mi)
- Elevation: 699 m (2,293 ft)

Population (2025-01-01)
  - Total: 475
  - Density: 12.1/km^{2} (31.4/sq mi)
- Time zone: UTC+1 (CET)
  - Summer (DST): UTC+2 (CEST)
- Postal code: 12310
- Website: http://www.forcall.es

Forcall is a municipality located in the province of Castellón, Valencian Community, Spain.
