= Palanques =

- Municipality
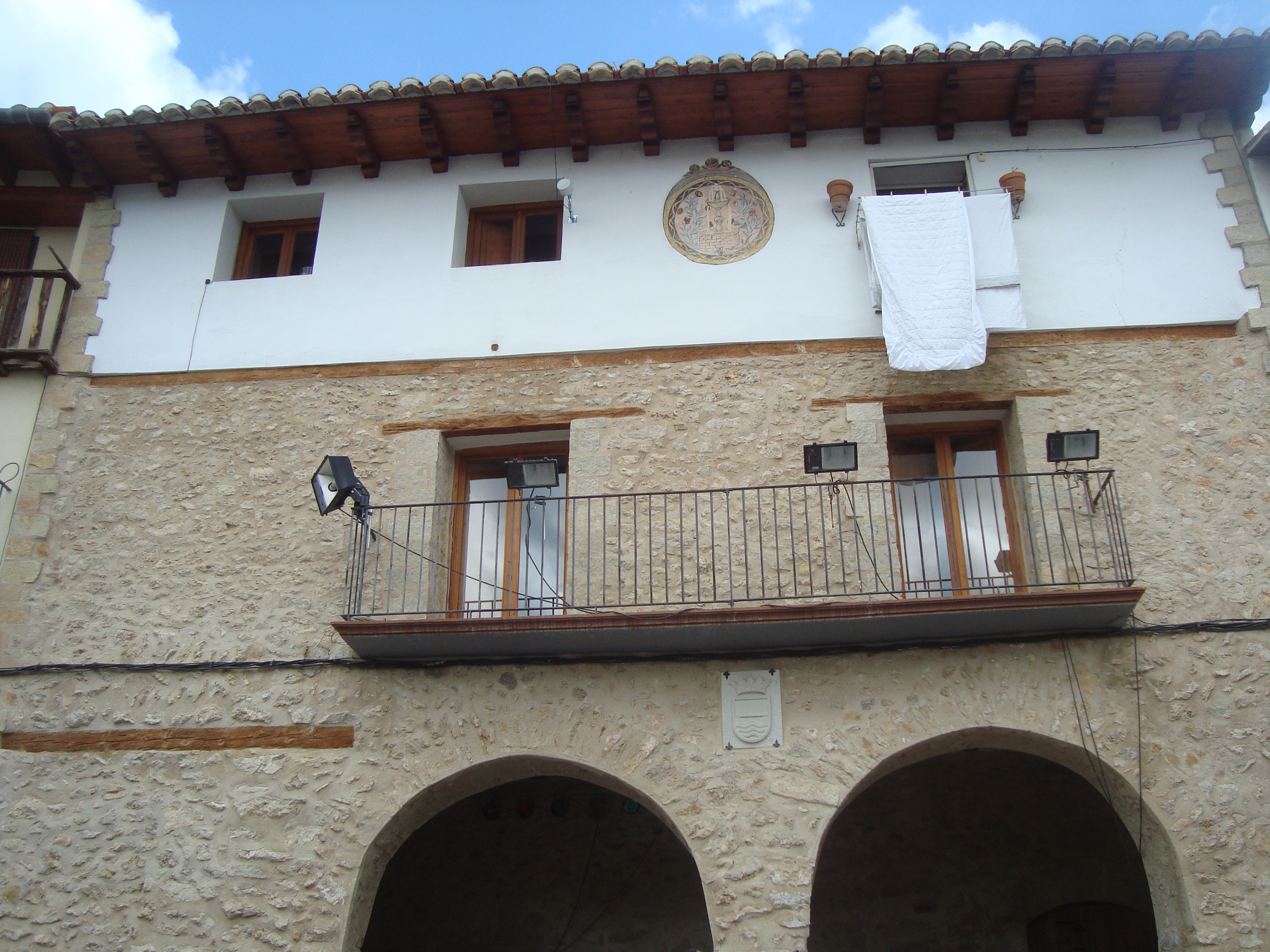

- Coat of arms

- Location in Spain
- Coordinates: 40°43′03″N 0°10′45″W
- Country: Spain
- Autonomous community: Valencian Community
- Province: Castellón
- Comarca: Ports
- Judicial district: Vinaròs

Area
  - Total: 14.3 km^{2} (5.5 sq mi)
- Elevation: 670 m (2,200 ft)

Population (2025-01-01)
  - Total: 34
  - Density: 2.4/km^{2} (6.2/sq mi)
- Demonym(s): Palanqui, palanquina
- Time zone: UTC+1 (CET)
  - Summer (DST): UTC+2 (CEST)
- Postal code: 12311
- Official language(s): Valencian

Palanques is a small town and municipality located at the northern end of the Ports comarca, province of Castelló, part of the autonomous community of Valencia, Spain. According to the 2009 census, it has a total population of 35 inhabitants. It is located near Morella.

The town's main church is dedicated to the Assumption of Mary and the Ermita de la Verge dels Dolors is a small church dedicated to Our Lady of Sorrows that lies within the town's municipal limit.

== History ==
Palanques was a Muslim town until nearby Morella was conquered by James I of Aragon in the 13th century. There are remains of an ancient tower in the town's main square.

The town has lost much population in the last 100 years; it had 249 inhabitants in 1900 and 1,133 in 1950. After the abandonment of traditional agricultural practices, like dryland farming and sheep and goat rearing, by the local youth and General Franco's Plan de Estabilización in 1959 the population has declined progressively as people emigrated towards the industrial areas of Barcelona and coastal Castelló Province in search of jobs.

By 2000 Palanques had only a residual population of 21 inhabitants. Nowadays some of the houses of the town are in ruins and others have been converted into summer houses. Palanques revives during the summer season when many former residents return to the town to spend the holidays, for its climate is continental with mild temperatures on summer nights.

== See also ==
- Morella
