= Herbers, Spain =

Herbers
- Municipality and town
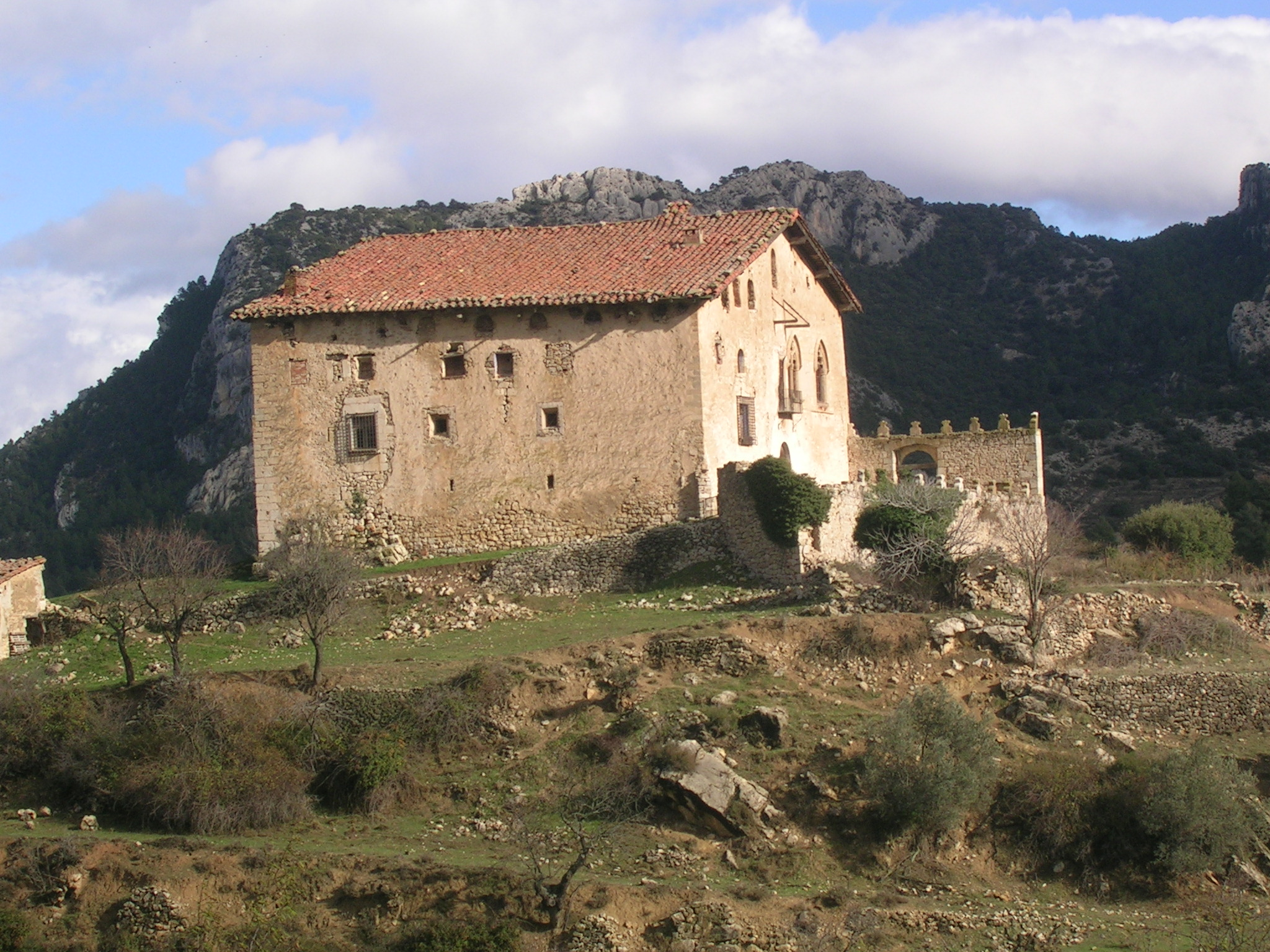

- Coat of arms
- Interactive map of Herbers
- Coordinates: 40°43′N 0°0′W
- Country: Spain
- Autonomous community: Valencian Community
- Province: Castellón
- Comarca: Ports

Area
  - Total: 27.1 km^{2} (10.5 sq mi)
- Elevation: 672 m (2,205 ft)

Population (2025-01-01)
  - Total: 68
  - Density: 2.5/km^{2} (6.5/sq mi)
- Time zone: UTC+1 (CET)
  - Summer (DST): UTC+2 (CEST)
- Postal code: 12317
- Website: http://www.herbers.es

Herbers (Valencian pronunciation: [eɾˈbes]) is a municipality located in the province of Castellón, Valencian Community, Spain.
