= Portell de Morella =

- Municipality and town
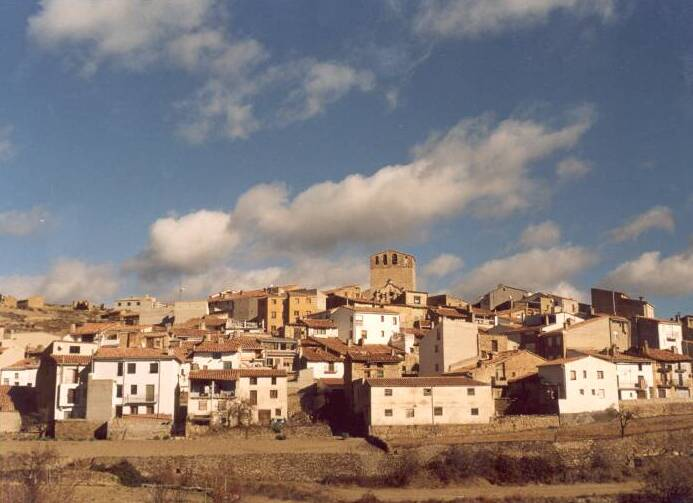
- Portell de Morella

- Coat of arms

- Location within Spain Location within Valencian Community
- Coordinates: 40°31′57″N 0°15′45″W
- Country: Spain
- Autonomous community: Valencian Community
- Province: Castellón
- Comarca: Ports

Area
  - Total: 49.4 km^{2} (19.1 sq mi)
- Elevation: 1,074 m (3,524 ft)

Population (2025-01-01)
  - Total: 155
  - Density: 3.14/km^{2} (8.13/sq mi)
- Time zone: UTC+1 (CET)
  - Summer (DST): UTC+2 (CEST)
- Postal code: 12318
- Website: http://www.portelldemorella.es

Portell de Morella is a municipality located in the province of Castellón, Valencian Community, Spain.
