= La Todolella =

- Municipality
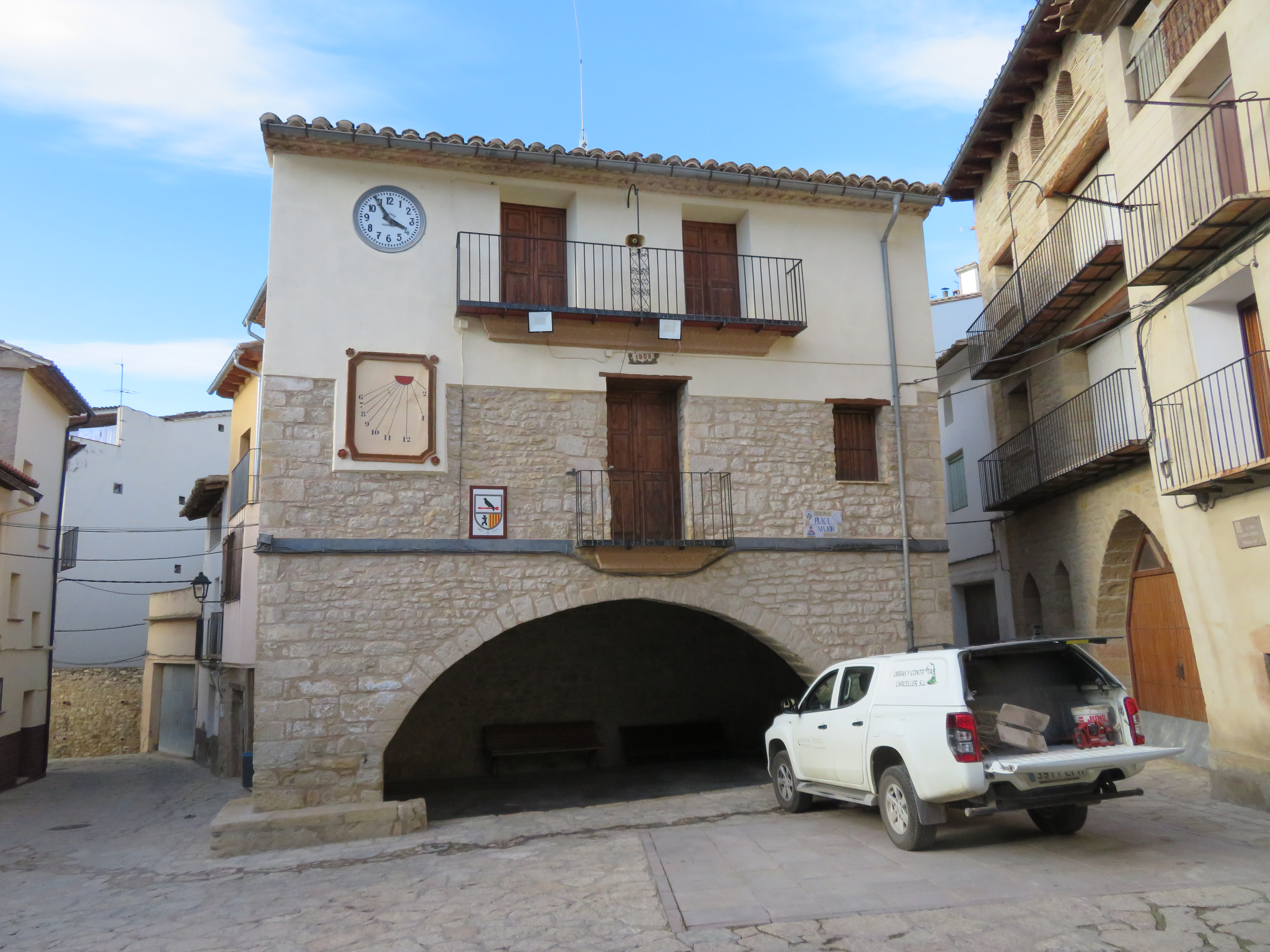
- Town hall

- Coat of arms

- Location in Spain
- Coordinates: 40°38′50″N 0°14′51″W
- Country: Spain
- Autonomous community: Valencian Community
- Province: Castellón
- Comarca: Ports
- Judicial district: Vinaròs

Area
  - Total: 34 km^{2} (13 sq mi)
- Elevation: 806 m (2,644 ft)

Population (2025-01-01)
  - Total: 136
  - Density: 4.0/km^{2} (10/sq mi)
- Time zone: UTC+1 (CET)
  - Summer (DST): UTC+2 (CEST)
- Postal code: 12312
- Official language(s): Valencian

La Todolella is a small town and municipality located in the Ports comarca, province of Castelló, part of the autonomous community of Valencia, Spain. According to the 2002 census, it has a total population of 140 inhabitants. One of its places of tourist interest is its medieval castle, dating back to the 14th century.

On February 6, 2005, a gas leak in Sant Cristòfol hostel in Todolella killed 18 people while they slept after a birthday celebration.
