= La Mata de Morella =

La Mata
- Municipality
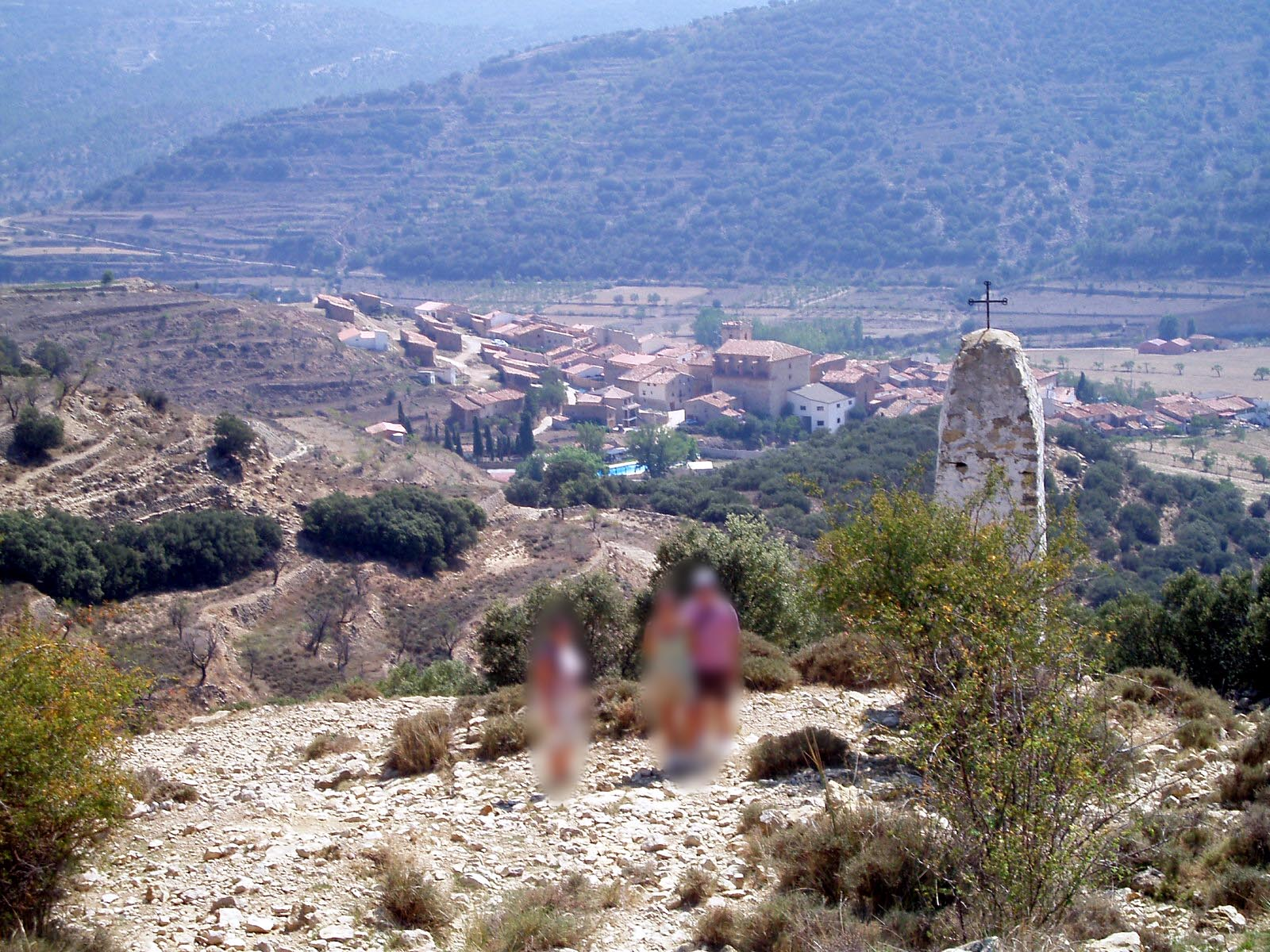

- Coat of arms

- Location in Spain
- Coordinates: 40°36′59″N 0°16′50″W
- Country: Spain
- Autonomous community: Valencian Community
- Province: Castellón
- Comarca: Ports
- Judicial district: Vinaròs

Government
  - Mayor: Mateo Royo Plana

Area
  - Total: 15.16 km^{2} (5.85 sq mi)
- Elevation: 826 m (2,710 ft)

Population (2025-01-01)
  - Total: 196
  - Density: 12.9/km^{2} (33.5/sq mi)
- Time zone: UTC+1 (CET)
  - Summer (DST): UTC+2 (CEST)
- Postal code: 12312
- Official language(s): Valencian

La Mata de Morella is a town in the province of Castellón, Valencian Community, Spain, pertaining to the region of the Ports of Morella. As of 2009, it has 192 inhabitants.

== See also ==
- List of municipalities in Castellón
