= Ports (comarca) =

Coordinates: 40.641°N 0.109861°W

Ports Los Puertos de Morella
- Comarca
- Location in the Valencian Community
- Country: Spain
- Autonomous community: Valencian Community
- Province: Castelló / Castellón
- Capital and largest city: Morella
- Municipalities: 13 municipalities: Castellfort, Cinctorres, Forcall, Herbers, La Mata, Morella, Olocau del Rey, Palanques, Portell de Morella, Todolella, Vallibona, Vilafranca, Villores, Zorita del Maestrazgo

Area
  - Total: 908.09 km^{2} (350.62 sq mi)

Population (2019)
  - Total: 4,400
  - Density: 4.8/km^{2} (13/sq mi)
- Time zone: UTC+1 (CET)
  - Summer (DST): UTC+2 (CEST)

Ports (Valencian: [ˈpɔɾts]; Spanish: Los Puertos de Morella [los ˈpweɾtos ðe moˈɾeʎa]) is a comarca in the province of Castellón, Valencian Community, Spain. It mostly overlaps the historical comarca known as Ports de Morella.

== Municipalities ==
The comarca is composed of thirteen municipalities, tabled below with their populations at the 2001 and 2011 Censuses, and according to the most recent official estimates (for 1 January 2019):

Name	Population (2001)	Population (2011)	Population (2019)
Castellfort	230	234	183
Cinctorres	502	473	391
Forcall	558	520	465
Herbers	90	57	42
La Mata de Morella	166	199	166
Morella	2,715	2,668	2,430
Olocau del Rey	138	131	119
Palanques	24	31	30
Portell de Morella	260	228	197
Todolella	138	140	155
Vallibona	90	99	69
Vilafranca	2,570	2,479	2,200
Villores	61	49	39
Zorita del Maestrazgo (Sorita de Morella)	137	145	114
Totals	7,542	7,308	6,486

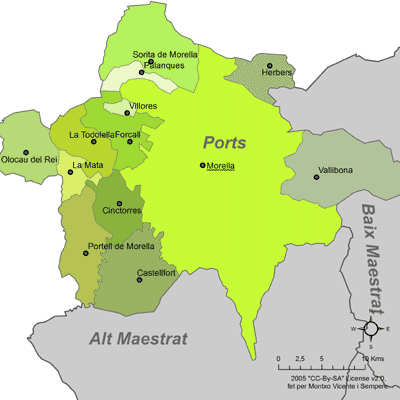
Municipalities of Ports (until 2022)

== See also ==
- Ports de Morella
- Maestrat
- Tinença de Benifassà
