= Comarques of the Valencian Community =

Administrative subdivisions in Spain

Comarques of the Valencian Community

The comarques of the Valencian Community form an intermediate level of administrative subdivision between municipalities and provinces. They are used as a basis for the provision of local services by the Generalitat Valenciana, but do not have any representative or executive bodies of their own.

In 1987, the Generalitat Valenciana published an official proposal for Homologated Territorial Demarcations, Demarcacions Territorials Homologades (DTH), of three degrees, where the first degree largely coincides with the territorial concept of comarca. Until now, the practice of these demarcations has been limited as a reference to the administrative decentralisation of the different services offered by the Generalitat, such as education, health, or agriculture. In fact, there is no legal provision for these DTHs to ultimately have the intended “territorial impact”, that is, comarca-level political or administrative bodies. Instead, the powers shared between several municipalities are being articulated through mancomunitats, or commonwealths.

Article 65 of the 2006 Statute of Autonomy provides the first legislative foundation for the comarques.

As of 2021, there are thirty-three comarques (including the city of Valencia).

== List of comarques ==
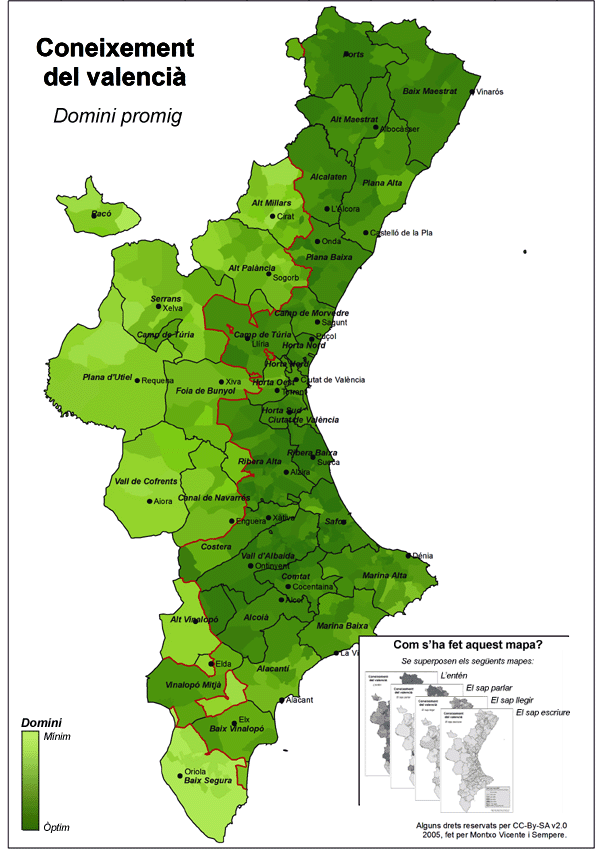
Knowledge of Valencian by comarques (2001). Note that east of the red line Valencian-speaking comarques are concentrated while on the western side Spanish-speaking ones.

Comarca	Population (2023)	Area (km²)	Density (i./km²)	Capital	Linguistic domain
Alacantí	509,049	673.59	755.72	Alicante / Alacant	Valencian
Alcalatén	14,050	391.4	35.89	L'Alcora	Valencian
Alcoià	112,028	539.66	207.58	Alcoi	Valencian
Alt Maestrat	6,392	846.05	7.55	Albocàsser	Valencian
Alto Mijares	4,232	667.06	6.34	Cirat	Spanish
Alto Palancia	25,269	965.15	26.18	Segorbe	Spanish
Alto Vinalopó / Alt Vinalopó	52,905	644.76	82.05	Villena	Spanish (mainly) / Valencian
Baix Maestrat	86,349	1,221.32	70.70	Vinaròs	Valencian
Baix Vinalopó	306,300	488.78	626.66	Elche / Elx	Valencian
Camp de Morvedre	97,826	271.1	360.84	Sagunt	Valencian
Camp de Túria	177,195	823.37	215.20	Llíria	Valencian (mainly) / Spanish
Canal de Navarrés	15,754	709.29	22.21	Enguera	Spanish
Comtat	28,119	376.4	74.70	Cocentaina	Valencian
Costera	72,297	528.1	136.9	Xàtiva	Valencian
Horta Nord	311,632	184.44	1,689.61	Puçol	Valencian
Horta Sud	482,569	309.73	1,558.03	Torrent	Valencian
Hoya de Buñol	46,039	817.37	52.08	Buñol	Spanish
Marina Alta	191,265	759.3	251.89	Dénia	Valencian
Marina Baixa	198,888	605.3	328.57	La Vila Joiosa	Valencian
Ports	6,674	998.54	6.68	Morella	Valencian (Spanish for Olocau del Rey)
Plana Alta	264,381	942.2	280.59	Castelló de la Plana	Valencian
Plana Baixa	196,605	605.2	324.85	Borriana	Valencian
Requena-Utiel	37,926	1,721.03	22.03	Requena	Spanish
Ribera Alta	228,406	1,011.5	225.80	Alzira	Valencian
Ribera Baixa	82,663	276.81	298.62	Sueca	Valencian
Rincón de Ademuz	2,221	370.22	5.99	Ademuz	Spanish
Serranos	17,115	1,405.28	12.17	Chelva	Spanish
Safor	179,185	429.80	416.90	Gandia	Valencian
València	807,693	134.63	5,999.35	València	Valencian
Vall d'Albaida	88,114	722.22	122	Ontinyent	Valencian
Valle de Ayora-Cofrentes	9,656	1,141.15	8.46	Cofrentes	Spanish
Vega Baja / Baix Segura	379,975	957.28	396.93	Orihuela	Spanish (Valencian for Guardamar del Segura)
Vinalopó Mitjà / Vinalopó Medio	171,828	798.6	215.16	Elda	Valencian (mainly) / Spanish (for Aspe and Monforte del Cid)
Total	5,210,600	23,254.49	224.06		

== Subcomarques ==
Some comarques are made up of two or more subcomarques. Most of them correspond with local geographical features. For instance, Alcoià is made up of two subcomarques: Foia de Castalla and Valls d'Alcoi.

== Historical comarques ==
Historical comarques refer to former comarques that are no longer extant.

Some historical comarques of the Valencian Community are now part of other comarques in the new territorial demarcation, such as Tinença de Benifassà and Ports de Morella.

Before 2021, Horta Oest was a formerly a comarca, when it was mostly annexed by Horta Sud with the municipality of Paterna joining Horta Nord.

== Bibliography ==
- Proposta de demarcacions territorials homologades, Direcció General d'Administració Local, València, D.L. 1988. Conselleria d'Administració Pública. ISBN 84-7579-587-0
