= List of municipalities in Castellón =

Map of Spain with the province of Castellón highlighted

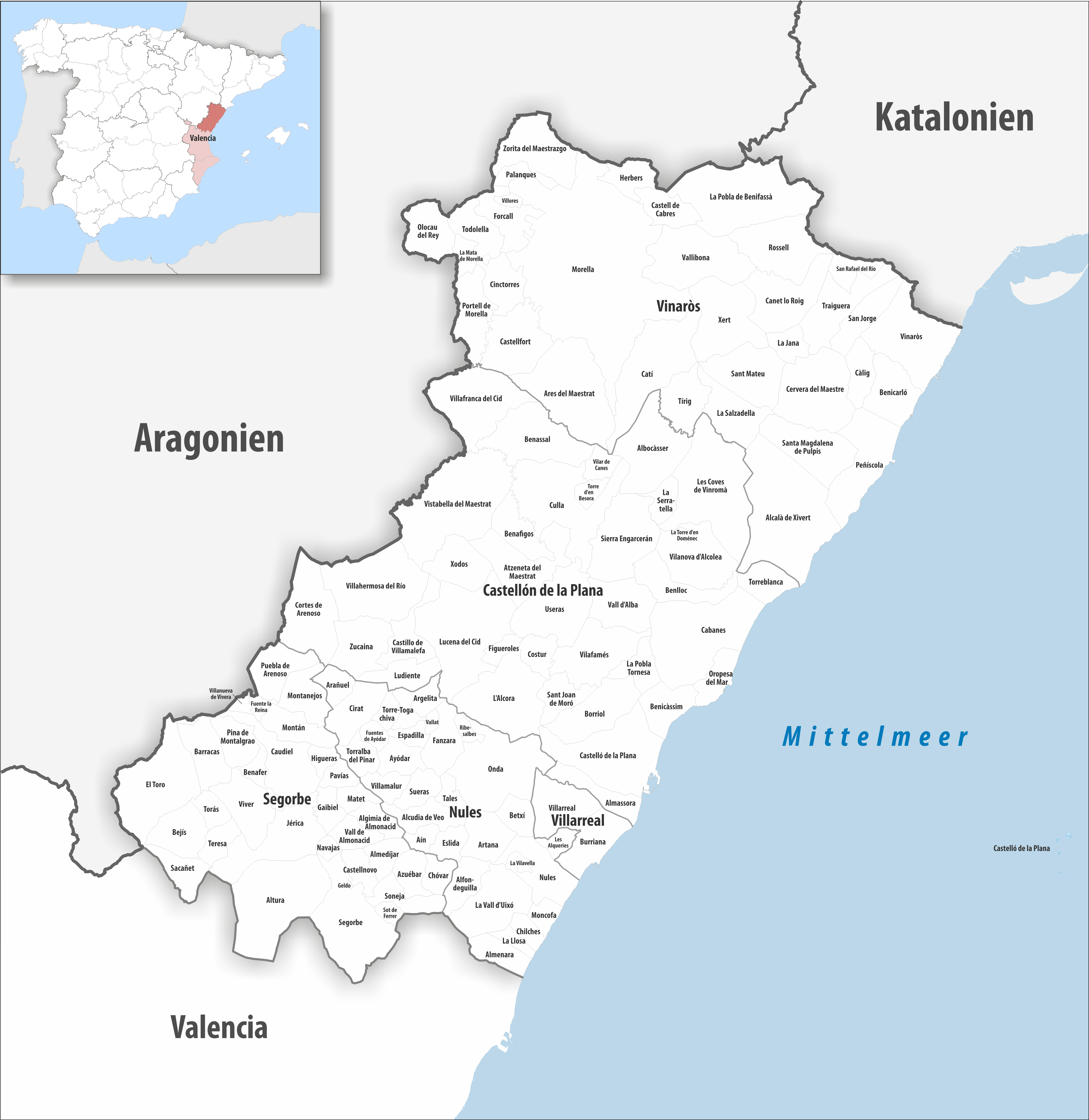
Map of the municipalities in the province of Castellón

This is a list of the 135 municipalities in the province of Castellón or Castelló in the Valencian Community, Spain, with their populations and the comarques in which they are situated.

== List ==
Official name	Name in Spanish	Name in co-official language (Valencian)	Population (2023)	Area (km^{2})	Density (2023)	Linguistic area	Comarca	INE code
Aín	Ahín	Aín	130	12.29	10.57	Valencian	Plana Baixa	12002
Albocàsser	Albocácer	Albocàsser	1,302	82.29	15.82	Valencian	Alt Maestrat	12003
Alcalà de Xivert	Alcalá de Chivert	Alcalà de Xivert	7,160	167.56	42.73	Valencian	Plana Alta	12004
L'Alcora	Alcora	L'Alcora	10,526	95.18	110.59	Valencian	Alcalatén	12005
Alcudia de Veo	Alcudia de Veo	L'Alcúdia de Veo	203	30.66	6.62	Valencian	Plana Baixa	12006
Alfondeguilla	Alfondeguilla		873	28.33	30.81	Valencian	Plana Baixa	12007
Algimia de Almonacid	Algimia de Amonacid	Algímia d'Almonesir	249	20.33	12.24	Spanish	Alto Palancia	12008
Almassora	Almazora	Almassora	27,892	32.97	845.98	Valencian	Plana Alta	12009
Almedíjar	Almedíjar	Almedíxer	280	20.9	13.39	Spanish	Alto Palancia	12010
Almenara	Almenara		6,591	27.63	238.54	Valencian	Plana Baixa	12011
Les Alqueries / Alquerías del Niño Perdido	Alquerías del Niño Perdido	Les Alqueries	4,539	12.61	359.95	Valencian	Plana Baixa	12901
Altura	Altura		3,695	129.43	28.54	Valencian	Alto Palancia	12012
Arañuel	Arañuel	Aranyel	165	19.16	8.61	Valencian	Alto Mijares	12013
Ares del Maestrat	Ares del Maestre	Ares del Maestrat	174	118.67	1.46	Valencian	Alt Maestrat	12014
Argelita	Argelita	Argeleta	156	15.47	10.08	Spanish	Alto Mijares	12015
Artana	Artana		1,980	36.33	54.50	Valencian	Plana Baixa	12016
Atzeneta del Maestrat	Adzaneta	Atzeneta del Maestrat	1,319	71.16	18.53	Valencian	Alcalatén	12001
Ayódar	Ayódar	Aiòder	178	24.36	7.30	Spanish	Alto Mijares	12017
Azuébar	Azuébar	Assuévar	336	23.4	14.35	Spanish	Alto Palancia	12018
Barracas	Barracas	Barraques	198	42.15	4.69	Spanish	Alto Palancia	12020
Bejís	Bejís	Begís	409	42.35	9.65	Spanish	Alto Palancia	12022
Benafer	Benafer		164	17.03	9.63	Spanish	Alto Palancia	12024
Benafigos	Benafigos		135	35.6	3.79	Valencian	Alcalatén	12025
Benassal	Benasal	Benassal	1,026	79.58	12.89	Valencian	Alt Maestrat	12026
Benicarló	Benicarló		28,681	47.86	599.26	Valencian	Baix Maestrat	12027
Benicàssim / Benicàsim	Benicasim	Benicàssim	19,951	36.29	549.76	Valencian	Plana Alta	12028
Benlloc	Benlloch	Benlloc	1,108	43.52	25.45	Valencian	Plana Alta	12029
Betxí	Bechí	Betxí	5,580	22.44	248.66	Valencian	Plana Baixa	12021
Borriana / Burriana	Burriana	Borriana	35,750	46.99	760.80	Valencian	Plana Baixa	12032
Borriol	Borriol		5,865	61.56	95.27	Valencian	Plana Alta	12031
Cabanes	Cabanes		3,222	131.56	24.49	Valencian	Plana Alta	12033
Càlig	Cálig	Càlig	2,013	27.47	73.27	Valencian	Baix Maestrat	12034
Canet lo Roig	Canet lo Roig		685	68.68	9.97	Valencian	Baix Maestrat	12036
Castell de Cabres	Castell de Cabres		19	30.72	0.61	Valencian	Baix Maestrat	12037
Castellfort	Castellfort		188	66.74	2.81	Valencian	Ports	12038
Castellnovo	Castellnovo	Castellnou	888	19.2	46.25	Spanish	Alto Palancia	12039
Castelló de la Plana	Castellón de la Plana	Castelló de la Plana	176,238	111.33	1,583.02	Valencian	Plana Alta	12040
Castillo de Villamalefa	Castillo de Villamalefa	El Castell de Vilamalefa	109	37.74	2.88	Spanish	Alto Mijares	12041
Catí	Catí		724	102.35	7.07	Valencian	Alt Maestrat	12042
Caudiel	Caudiel		716	62.38	11.47	Spanish	Alto Palancia	12043
Cervera del Maestre	Cervera del Maestre	Cervera del Maestrat	656	93.24	7.03	Valencian	Baix Maestrat	12044
Chóvar	Chóvar	Xòvar	310	18.31	16.93	Spanish	Alto Palancia	12056
Cinctorres	Cinctorres		427	35.06	12.17	Valencian	Ports	12045
Cirat	Cirat		223	41.1	5.42	Spanish	Alto Mijares	12046
Cortes de Arenoso	Cortes de Arenoso	Cortes d'Arenós	304	80.59	3.77	Spanish	Alto Mijares	12048
Costur	Costur		535	21.93	24.39	Valencian	Alcalatén	12049
Les Coves de Vinromà	Cuevas de Vinromá	Les Coves de Vinromá	1,813	136.44	13.28	Valencian	Plana Alta	12050
Culla	Culla		480	115.86	4.14	Valencian	Alt Maestrat	12051
Eslida	Eslida		758	18.13	41.80	Valencian	Plana Baixa	12057
Espadilla	Espadilla	Espadella	90	11.96	7.52	Spanish	Alto Mijares	12058
Fanzara	Fanzara		294	34.98	8.40	Spanish	Alto Mijares	12059
Figueroles	Figueroles		518	12.9	40.15	Valencian	Alcalatén	12060
Forcall	Forcall	El Forcall	473	39.21	12.06	Valencian	Ports	12061
Fuente la Reina	Fuente la Reina	La Font de la Reina	59	7.5	7.86	Spanish	Alto Mijares	12063
Fuentes de Ayódar	Fuentes de Ayódar	Les Fonts d'Aiòder	98	10.98	8.92	Spanish	Alto Mijares	12064
Gaibiel	Gaibiel		197	18.08	10.89	Spanish	Alto Palancia	12065
Geldo	Geldo		650	0.56	1,160.71	Spanish	Alto Palancia	12067
Herbers	Herbés	Herbers	72	27.12	2.65	Valencian	Ports	12068
Higueras	Higueras	Figueres	50	11.84	4.22	Spanish	Alto Palancia	12069
La Jana	La Jana		678	19.5	34.76	Valencian	Baix Maestrat	12070
Jérica	Jérica	Xèrica	1,794	78.27	22.92	Spanish	Alto Palancia	12071
La Llosa	La Llosa		1,003	10.03	100	Valencian	Plana Baixa	12074
Llucena / Lucena del Cid	Lucena del Cid	Llucena	1,369	137.04	9.98	Valencian	Alcalatén	12072
Ludiente	Ludiente	Lludient	155	31.35	4.94	Spanish	Alto Mijares	12073
La Mata de Morella	La Mata de Morella		179	15.16	11.80	Valencian	Ports	12075
Matet	Matet		84	14.89	5.64	Spanish	Alto Palancia	12076
Moncofa	Moncófar	Moncofa	7,747	14.53	533.17	Valencian	Plana Baixa	12077
Montán	Montán	Montant	399	34.1	11.70	Spanish	Alto Mijares	12078
Montanejos	Montanejos		603	37.8	15.95	Spanish	Alto Mijares	12079
Morella	Morella		2,492	413.54	6.02	Valencian	Ports	12080
Navajas	Navajas		840	7.89	106.47	Spanish	Alto Palancia	12081
Nules	Nules		13,827	50.53	273.63	Valencian	Plana Baixa	12082
Olocau del Rey	Olocau del Rey	Olocau del Rei	126	43.98	2.86	Spanish	Ports	12083
Onda	Onda		25,547	108.2	236.10	Valencian	Plana Baixa	12084
Orpesa / Oropesa del Mar	Oropesa del Mar	Orpesa	10,958	26.55	412.73	Valencian	Plana Alta	12085
Palanques	Palanques		36	14.32	2.51	Valencian	Ports	12087
Pavías	Pavías	Pavies	74	14.41	5.13	Spanish	Alto Palancia	12088
Peníscola / Peñíscola	Peñíscola	Peníscola	8,449	78.97	106.98	Valencian	Baix Maestrat	12089
Pina de Montalgrao	Pina de Montalgrao	Pina	119	31.6	3.76	Spanish	Alto Palancia	12090
La Pobla de Benifassà	Puebla de Benifasar	La Pobla de Benifassà	235	136.17	1.72	Valencian	Baix Maestrat	12093
La Pobla Tornesa	Puebla-Tornesa	La Pobla Tornesa	1,309	25.91	50.52	Valencian	Plana Alta	12094
Portell de Morella	Portell de Morella		166	49.4	3.36	Valencian	Ports	12091
Puebla de Arenoso	Puebla de Arenoso	La Pobla d'Arenós	169	42.53	3.97	Spanish	Alto Mijares	12092
Ribesalbes	Ribesalbes		1,135	8.54	132.90	Valencian	Plana Baixa	12095
Rossell	Rosell	Rossell	891	74.88	11.89	Valencian	Baix Maestrat	12096
Sacañet	Sacañet	Sacanyet	86	30.5	2.81	Spanish	Alto Palancia	12097
La Salzadella	Salsadella	La Salzadella	660	49.92	13.22	Valencian	Baix Maestrat	12098
San Rafael del Río	San Rafael del Río	Sant Rafel del Riu	494	21.15	23.35	Valencian	Baix Maestrat	12101
Sant Joan de Moró	San Juan de Moró	Sant Joan de Moró	3,516	28.66	122.67	Valencian	Plana Alta	12902
San Jorge / Sant Jordi	Sant Jorge	Sant Jordi	1,249	36.49	34.22	Valencian	Baix Maestrat	12099
Sant Mateu	San Mateo	Sant Mateu	1,987	64.62	30.74	Valencian	Baix Maestrat	12100
Santa Magdalena de Pulpis	Santa Magdalena de Pulpis	Santa Magdalena de Polpís	784	66.49	11.79	Valencian	Baix Maestrat	12102
Segorbe	Segorbe	Segorb	9,425	106.2	88.74	Spanish	Alto Palancia	12104
La Serratella	Sarratella	La Serratella	110	18.81	5.84	Valencian	Plana Alta	12103
Sierra Engarcerán	Sierra Engarcerán	La Serra d'en Galceran	1,045	81.98	12.74	Valencian	Plana Alta	12105
Soneja	Soneja	Soneixa	1,508	29.1	51.82	Spanish	Alto Palancia	12106
Sot de Ferrer	Sot de Ferrer		474	8.64	54.86	Spanish	Alto Palancia	12107
Sueras / Suera	Sueras	Suera	572	22.22	25.74	Valencian	Plana Baixa	12108
Tales	Tales		852	14.53	58.63	Valencian	Plana Baixa	12109
Teresa	Teresa		250	19.89	12.56	Spanish	Alto Palancia	12110
Tírig	Tírig		430	42.34	10.15	Valencian	Alt Maestrat	12111
Todolella	Todolella	La Todolella	144	34.03	4.23	Valencian	Ports	12112
Toga	Toga		112	13.52	8.28	Spanish	Alto Mijares	12113
Torás	Torás	Toràs	256	16.78	15.25	Spanish	Alto Palancia	12114
El Toro	El Toro		248	109.95	2.25	Spanish	Alto Palancia	12115
Torralba del Pinar	Torralba del Pinar	Torralba	69	21.19	3.25	Spanish	Alto Mijares	12116
Torreblanca	Torreblanca		5,630	29.79	188.98	Valencian	Plana Alta	12117
Torrechiva	Torrechiva	Torre-xiva	114	11.85	9.62	Spanish	Alto Mijares	12118
La Torre d'en Besora	Torre Embesora	La Torre d'en Besora	164	12.31	13.32	Valencian	Alt Maestrat	12119
La Torre d'en Doménec	Torre Endoménech	La Torre d'en Doménec	175	3.19	54.85	Valencian	Plana Alta	12120
Traiguera	Traiguera		1,336	59.76	22.35	Valencian	Baix Maestrat	12121
Les Useres / Useras	Useras	Les Useres	985	80.69	12.20	Valencian	Alcalatén	12122
Vall d'Alba	Vall d'Alba	La Vall d'Alba	3,054	52.92	57.70	Valencian	Plana Alta	12124
Vall de Almonacid	Vall de Almonacid	La Vall d'Almonesir	286	21.12	13.54	Spanish	Alto Palancia	12125
La Vall d'Uixó	Vall de Uxó	La Vall d'Uixó	31,611	67.08	471.74	Valencian	Plana Baixa	12126
Vallat	Vallat		66	5.01	13.17	Spanish	Alto Mijares	12123
Vallibona	Vallibona		62	91.37	0.67	Valencian	Ports	12127
Vilafamés	Villafamés	Vilafamés	1,915	70.55	27.14	Valencian	Plana Alta	12128
Vilafranca / Villafranca del Cid	Villafranca del Cid	Vilafranca	2,148	93.85	22.88	Valencian	Alt Maestrat	12129
Vilanova d'Alcolea	Villanueva de Alcolea	Vilanova d'Alcolea	575	68.41	8.40	Valencian	Plana Alta	12132
Vilar de Canes	Villar de Canes	Vilar de Canes	159	15.91	9.99	Valencian	Alt Maestrat	12134
Vila-real	Villarreal	Vila-real	51,852	55.12	940.71	Valencian	Plana Baixa	12135
La Vilavella	Villavieja	La Vilavella	3,074	6.15	499.83	Valencian	Plana Baixa	12136
Villahermosa del Río	Villahermosa del Río	Vilafermosa	488	108.88	4.48	Spanish	Alto Mijares	12130
Villamalur	Villamalur	Vilamalur	95	19.47	4.87	Spanish	Alto Mijares	12131
Villanueva de Viver	Villanueva de Viver	Vilanova de Viver	110	5.95	18.48	Spanish	Alto Mijares	12133
Villores	Villores		54	5.31	10.16	Valencian	Ports	12137
Vinaròs	Vinaroz	Vinaròs	29,686	95.46	310.97	Valencian	Baix Maestrat	12138
Vistabella del Maestrat	Vistabella del Maestrazgo	Vistabella del Maestrat	369	151	2.44	Valencian	Alt Maestrat	12139
Viver	Viver		1,683	49.93	33.70	Spanish	Alto Palancia	12140
Xilxes / Chilches	Chilches	Xilxes	2,981	13.58	219.51	Valencian	Plana Baixa	12053
Xert	Chert	Xert	686	82.51	8.31	Valencian	Baix Maestrat	12152
Xodos / Chodos	Chodos	Xodos	117	44.27	2.64	Valencian	Alcalatén	12155
Zorita del Maestrazgo	Zorita del Maestrazgo	Sorita	117	68.83	1.69	Valencian	Ports	12141
Zucaina	Zucaina	Sucaina	176	51.57	3.41	Spanish	Alto Mijares	12142

== See also ==
- Geography of Spain
- List of Spanish cities
