= Arenós Reservoir =

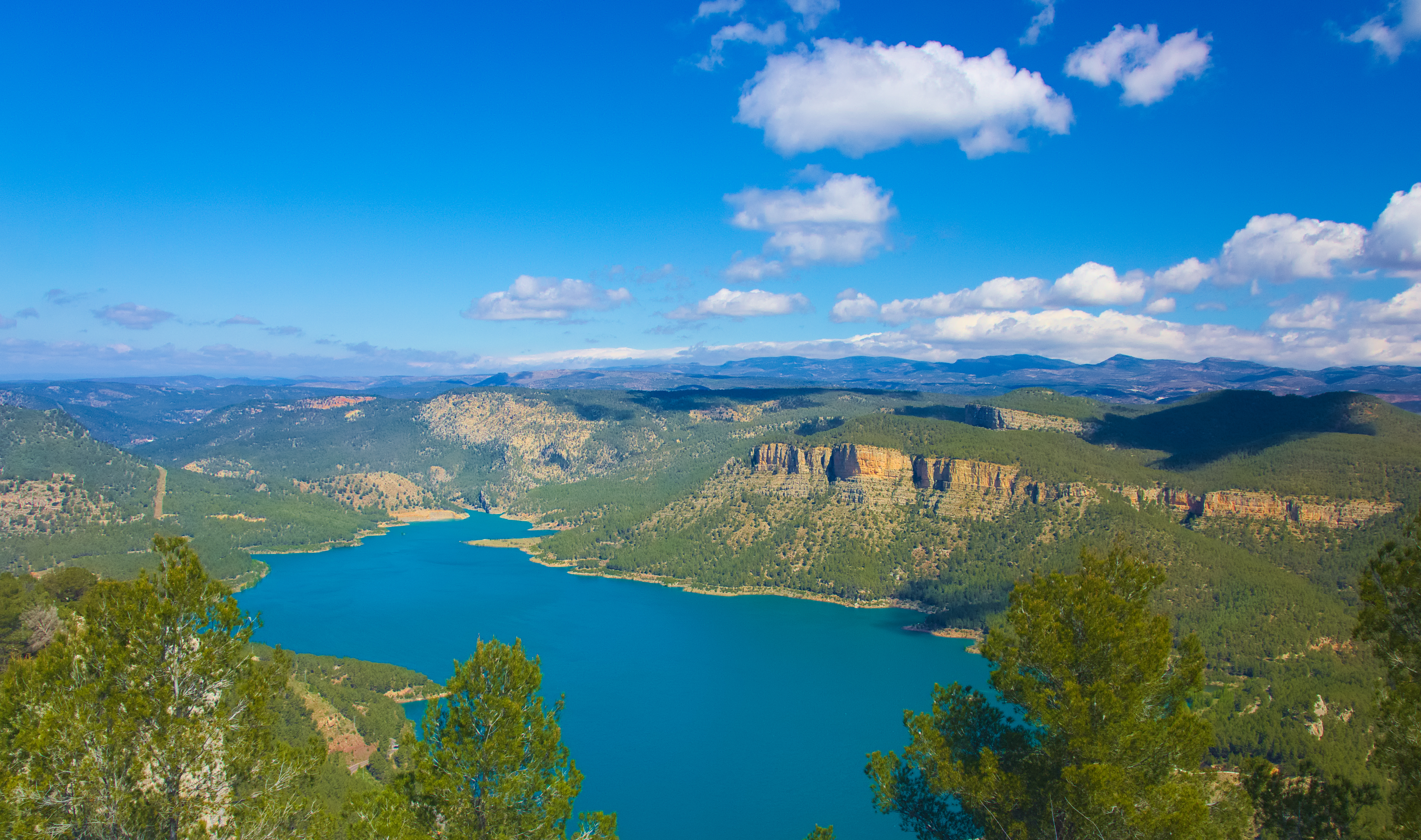

- Location within Valencian Community Location within Spain
- Interactive map of Arenós Reservoir
- Location: Puebla de Arenoso, Valencia
- Coordinates: 40°5′40″N 0°33′35″W
- Type: Reservoir
- Primary inflows: Millars River
- Basin countries: Spain
- Built: circa 1970

Arenós Reservoir is a reservoir in Puebla de Arenoso and Montanejos, Castellón, Land of Valencia, Spain.
