= Espadella =

Espadella may refer to:

- Espadilla, a municipality in the Alt Millars comarca, Valencian Community, Spain
- Espadella, a 968 m high peak, highest point of the Serra de l'Espadella range in the Baix Maestrat comarca, Valencian Community, Spain
