= Jaume Mateu =

Valencian Gothic painter

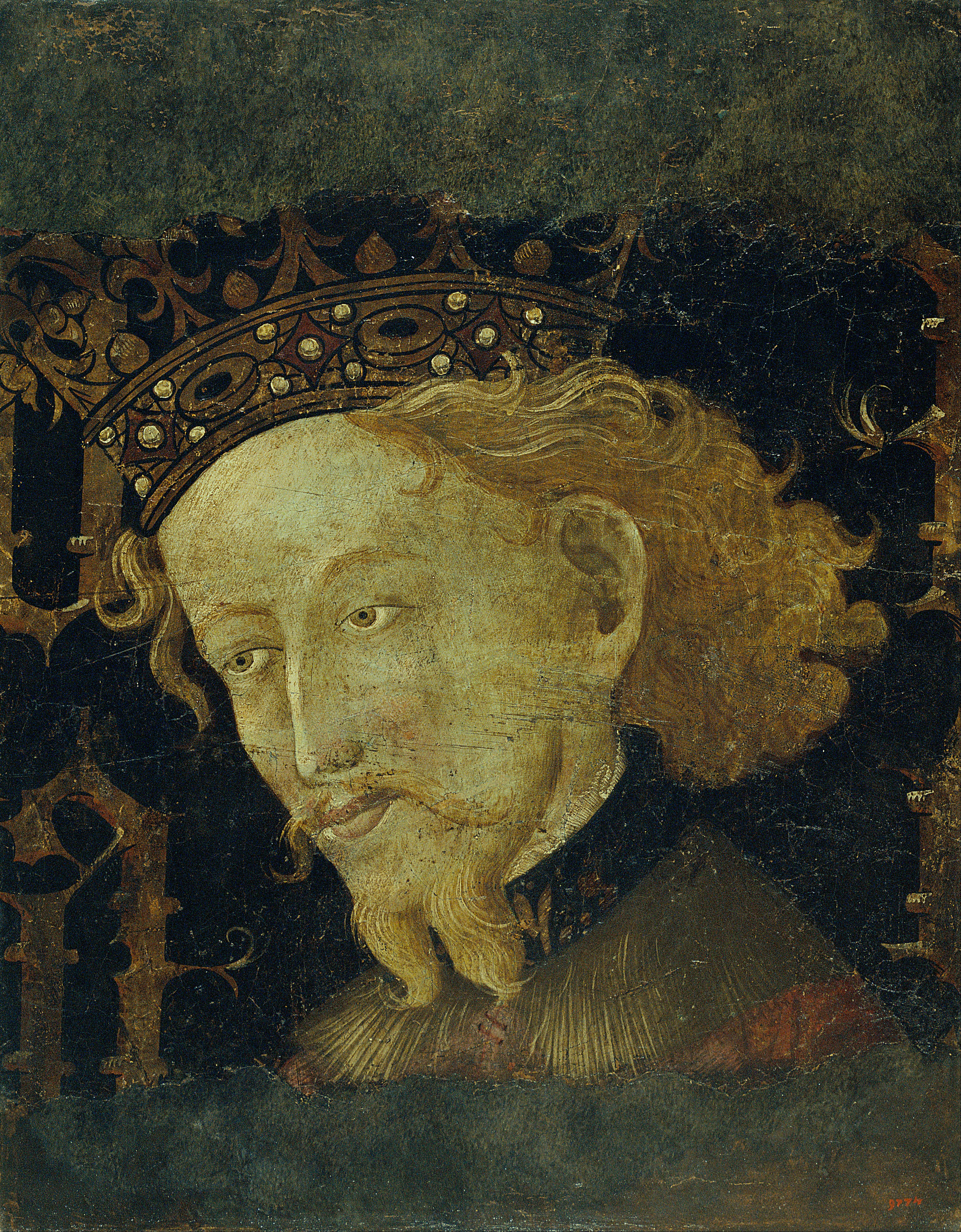
Alleged portrait of James I of Aragon, attributed to Jaume Mateu and Gonzalo Pérez and conserved at MNAC Barcelona.

Jaume Mateu (1382–1452) was a Valencian painter of the Gothic style. The nephew and collaborator of Pere Nicolau, he is known to have worked in Valencia from 1402 to 1453.

Works attributed to him include the Adoration of the Shepherds (1430, part of an altarpiece now disappeared) in the museum of Cortes de Arenoso and a Nativity (1430). He participated in the coffer decoration of the Golden Hall Llotja de la Seda.

He is known to have taken commissions from patrons in Teruel and Barcelona.

== Sources ==
- Manuel Cerdà, ed. (2005). Gran Enciclopedia de la Comunidad Valenciana. Valencia: Editorial Prensa Valenciana. ISBN 84-87502-57-1.
