= Aín =

Municipality in Valencia, Castellón, Spain

- Municipality
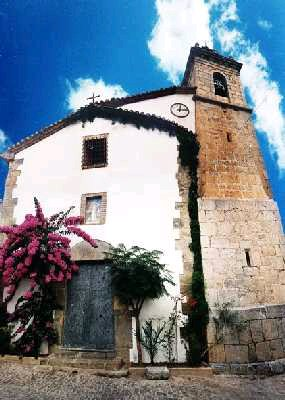
- St. Michael church.

- Coat of arms

- Location in Spain
- Coordinates: 39°53′01″N 0°20′27″W
- Country: Spain
- Autonomous community: Valencian Community
- Province: Castelló
- Comarca: Plana Baixa
- Judicial district: Nules

Government
  - Mayor: Ricardo Miro Ballester

Area
  - Total: 12.30 km^{2} (4.75 sq mi)
- Elevation: 498 m (1,634 ft)

Population (2025-01-01)
  - Total: 133
  - Density: 10.8/km^{2} (28.0/sq mi)
- Demonym: Aïnencs
- Time zone: UTC+1 (CET)
  - Summer (DST): UTC+2 (CEST)
- Postal code: 12530
- Official language(s): Valencian and Spanish
- Climate: Csa
- Website: Official website

Aín (Spanish: Ahín) is a town in eastern Spain, in the province of Castellón, part of the autonomous community of Valencia.

It is home to a 13th-century castle.

== See also ==
- List of municipalities in Castellón
