= Fuente la Reina =

- Municipality
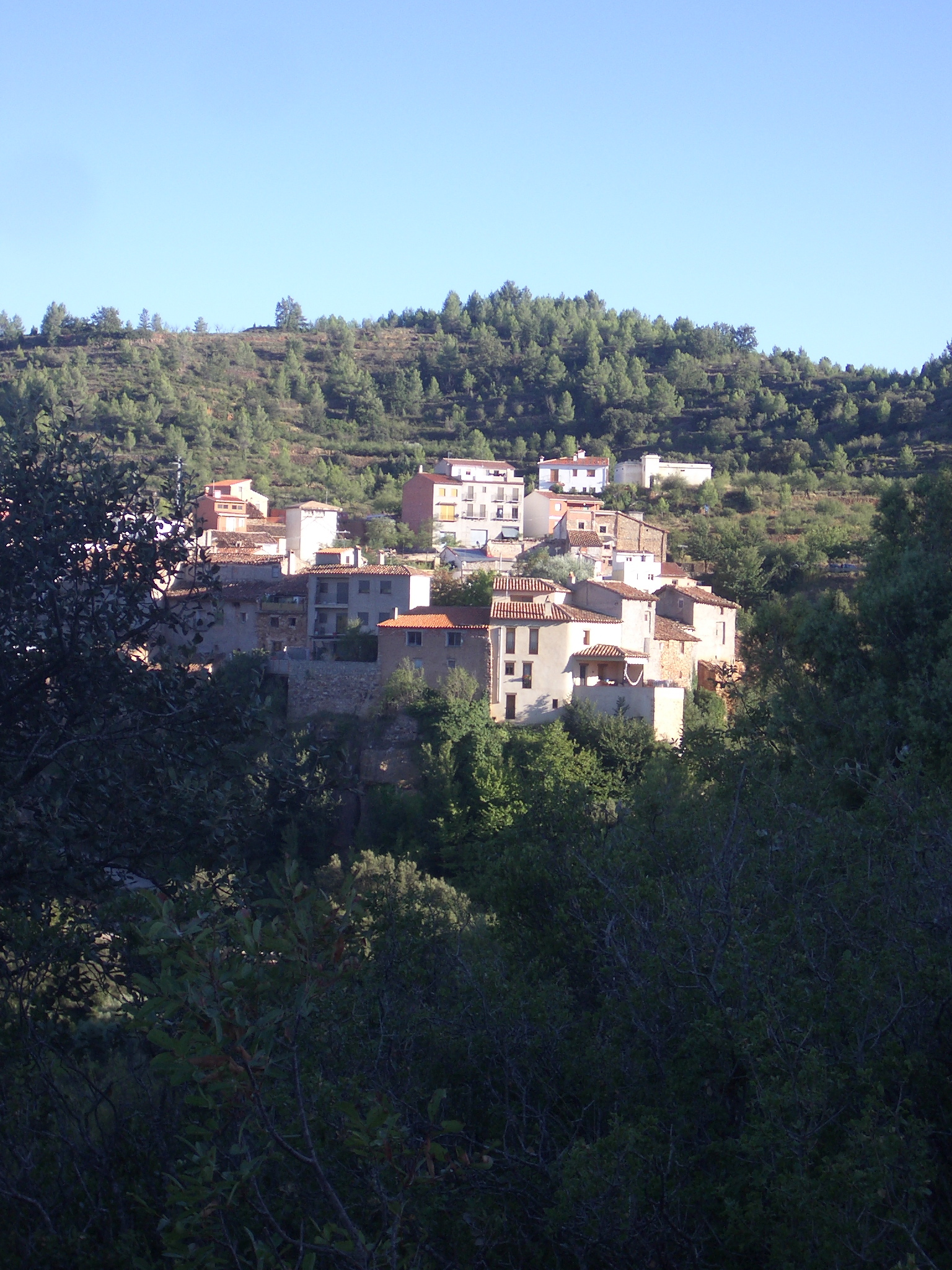
- View of Fuente la Reina.

- Flag Coat of arms

- Location of Fuente la Reina. Fuente la Reina (Valencian Community)
- Coordinates: 40°04′N 0°36′W
- Country: Spain
- Community: Valencia
- Province: Castellón
- Comarca: Alto Mijares

Government
  - Type: Concejo abierto
  - Mayor: Gonzalo Moliner Bellod (PSPV)

Area
  - Total: 7.42 km^{2} (2.86 sq mi)

Population (2023)
  - Total: 59
  - Density: 8.0/km^{2} (21/sq mi)
- Time zone: UTC+1 (CET)
  - Summer (DST): UTC+2 (CEST)
- Postal code: 12428
- Website: www.fuentelareina.es

Fuente la Reina is a municipality in the comarca of Alto Mijares, Castellón, Valencia, Spain.

== See also ==
- List of municipalities in Castellón
