= Fuentes de Ayódar =

- Municipality
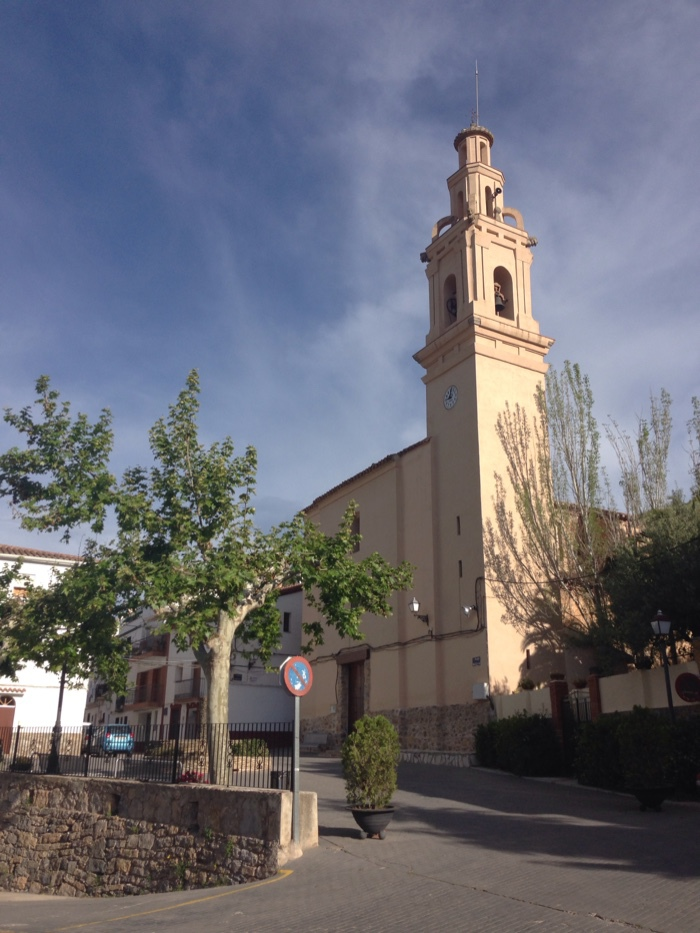
- A church in Fuentes de Ayódar.

- Coat of arms

- Location of Fuentes de Ayódar. Fuentes de Ayódar (Valencian Community)
- Coordinates: 40°02′N 0°25′W
- Country: Spain
- Community: Valencia
- Province: Castellón
- Comarca: Alto Mijares

Government
  - Mayor: Jordi Lucena Lucas (PP)

Area
  - Total: 10.98 km^{2} (4.24 sq mi)

Population (2023)
  - Total: 98
  - Density: 8.9/km^{2} (23/sq mi)
- Time zone: UTC+1 (CET)
  - Summer (DST): UTC+2 (CEST)
- Postal code: 12225
- Website: www.fuentesdeayodar.es

Fuentes de Ayódar (locally: Juentes d’Ayódar) is a municipality in the comarca of Alto Mijares, Castellón, Valencia, Spain.

== See also ==
- List of municipalities in Castellón
