= Castell de Cabres =

- Municipality and town
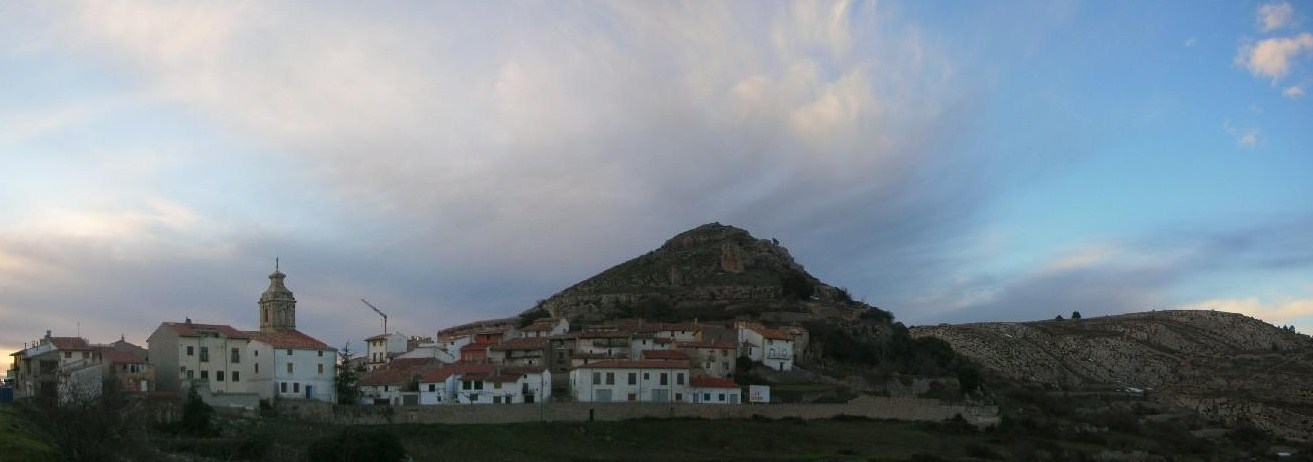
- Winter view of the village.

- Coat of arms
- Interactive map of Castell de Cabres
- Coordinates: 40°39′0″N 0°02′0″E
- Country: Spain
- Autonomous community: Valencian Community
- Province: Castellón
- Comarca: Baix Maestrat

Government
  - Type: Consell obert
  - Mayor: María José Tena Gasulla (PSPV)

Area
  - Total: 30.7 km^{2} (11.9 sq mi)
- Elevation: 1,129 m (3,704 ft)

Population (2025-01-01)
  - Total: 21
  - Density: 0.68/km^{2} (1.8/sq mi)
- Time zone: UTC+1 (CET)
  - Summer (DST): UTC+2 (CEST)
- Postal code: 12319
- Website: http://www.castelldecabres.es

Castell de Cabres is a municipality located in the province of Castellón, Valencian Community, Spain.

== See also ==
- List of municipalities in Castellón
