= Chóvar =

- Municipality
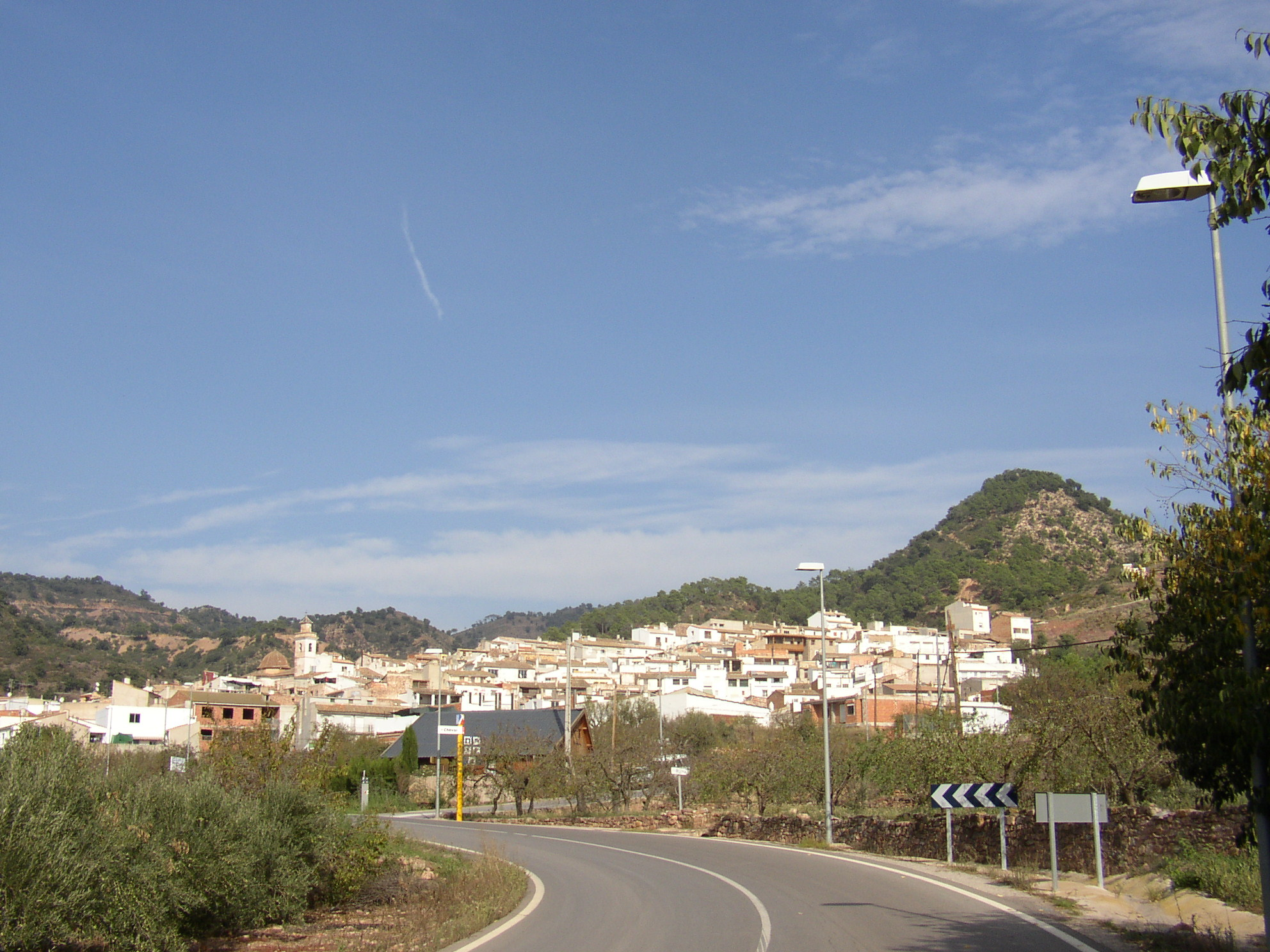
- View of Chóvar.

- Coat of arms

- Location of Chóvar. Chóvar (Valencian Community)
- Coordinates: 39°51′N 0°19′W
- Country: Spain
- Community: Valencia
- Province: Castellón
- Comarca: Alto Palancia

Government
  - Mayor: Lorena Bonifás (PP)

Area
  - Total: 18.31 km^{2} (7.07 sq mi)

Population (2023)
  - Total: 310
  - Density: 17/km^{2} (44/sq mi)
- Time zone: UTC+1 (CET)
  - Summer (DST): UTC+2 (CEST)
- Postal code: 12499
- Website: www.chovar.es

Chóvar is a municipality in the comarca of Alto Palancia, Castellón, Valencia, Spain.

== See also ==
- List of municipalities in Castellón
