= Geldo =

Coordinates: 39°50′N 0°28′W

- Flag Coat of arms

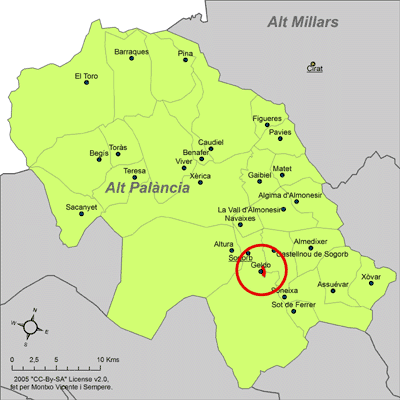
- Location of Geldo in Alto Palancia.
- Country: Spain
- A. community: Valencian Community
- Province: Castellón
- Comarca: Alto Palancia
- Municipality: Geldo

Government
  - Alcalde: Salvador Enrique Anaya Montán (PP)

Area
  - Total: 0.50 km^{2} (0.19 sq mi)
- Elevation: 300 m (980 ft)

Population (2024-01-01)
  - Total: 651
  - Density: 1,300/km^{2} (3,400/sq mi)
- Website: www.geldo.com

Geldo is a municipality of Spain in the Valencian Community, in the province of Castellón. It has a population of 716 (2005) and an area of 0.50 km^{2}.
