= Cirat =

Coordinates: 40°03′N 0°27′W

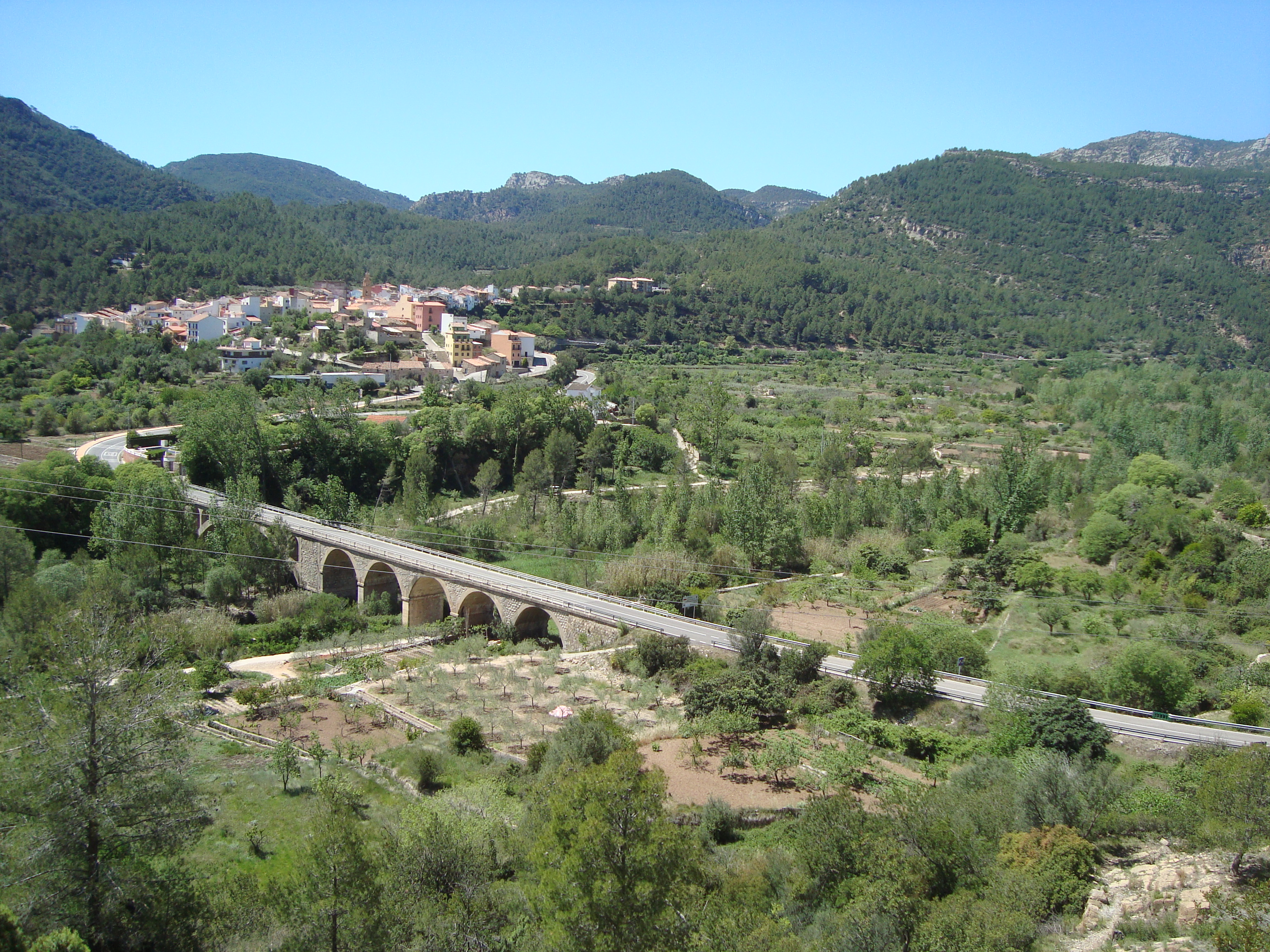

- Flag Coat of arms

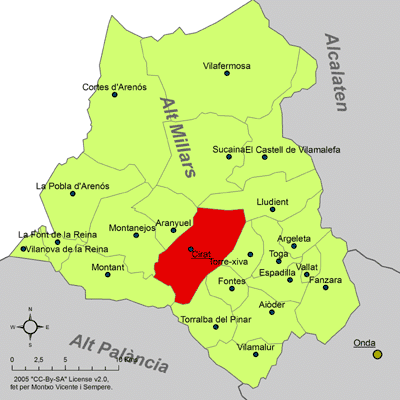
- Location of Cirat in Alto Mijares.
- Country: Spain
- Autonomous community: Valencian Community
- Province: Castellón
- Comarca: Alto Mijares
- Municipality: Cirat

Government
  - Alcalde: Jesús Daniel Gargallo Peña

Area
  - Total: 41.1 km^{2} (15.9 sq mi)
- Elevation: 339 m (1,112 ft)

Population (2025-01-01)
  - Total: 220
  - Density: 5.4/km^{2} (14/sq mi)
- Website: www.cirat.net

Cirat is a municipality of Valencia in the province of Castellón, Spain. It has a population of approximately 240 and is the capital of Alto Mijares.

== Sources ==
- Official website
