= Ayódar =

Coordinates: 40°00′N 0°22′W

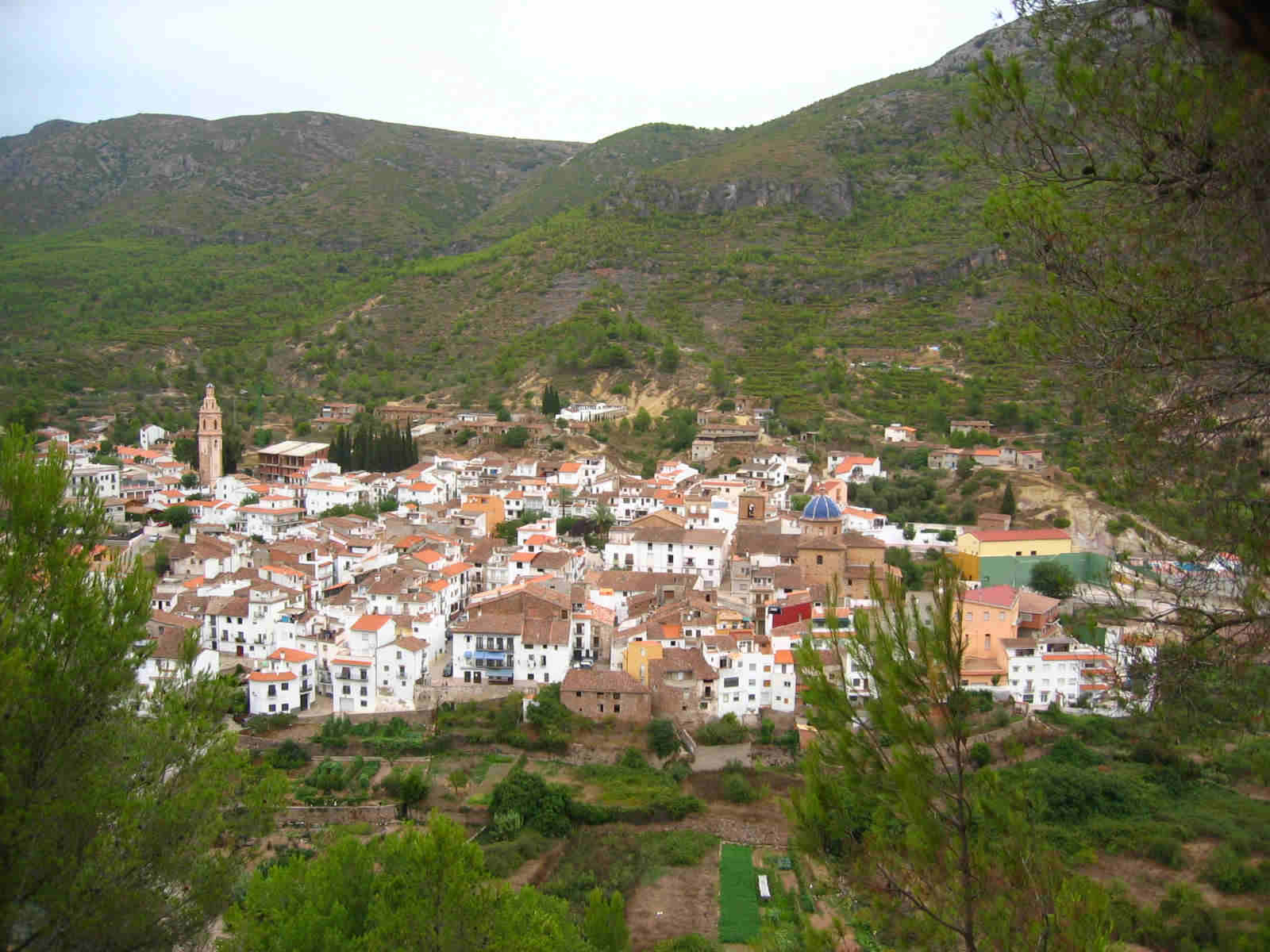
View of Ayodar Town in Castellón

Ayódar's flag

Ayódar's coat of arms

Ayódar is a municipality in the comarca of Alto Mijares, Castellón, Valencia, Spain.

== See also ==
- List of municipalities in Castellón
