= Zucaina =

- Municipality
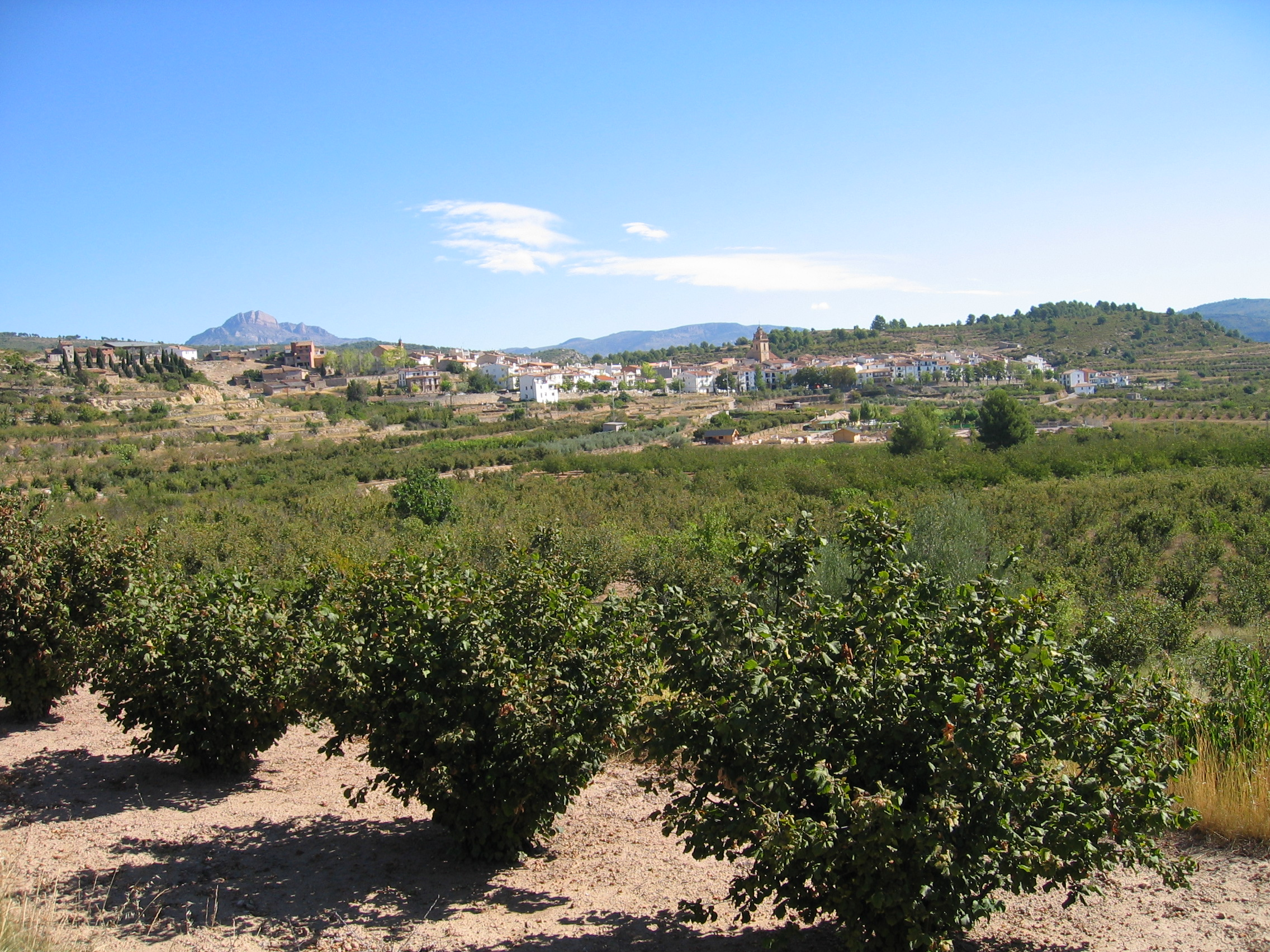
- General view of Zucaina from La Santanica

- Coat of arms

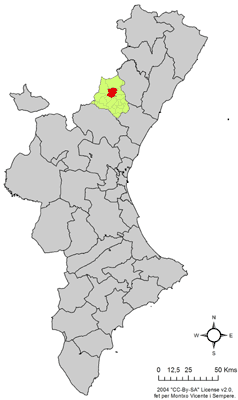
- Location in the Valencian Community

- Location in Spain
- Coordinates: 40°07′54″N 0°25′07″W
- Country: Spain
- Autonomous community: Valencian Community
- Province: Castelló
- Comarca: Alto Mijares
- Judicial district: Lucena del Cid

Government
  - Alcalde: José María Ibáñez Zafón (2011) (PSOE)

Area
  - Total: 51.6 km^{2} (19.9 sq mi)
- Elevation: 812 m (2,664 ft)

Population (2025-01-01)
  - Total: 171
  - Density: 3.31/km^{2} (8.58/sq mi)
- Demonym(s): Zucaineros, Borrazoneros
- Time zone: UTC+1 (CET)
  - Summer (DST): UTC+2 (CEST)
- Official language(s): Spanish
- Website: Official website

Zucaina is a municipality in the comarca of Alto Mijares, Castellón, Valencia, Spain.
