= Rosell =

Surname

Rosell is a surname. Notable people with the surname include:

- Basilio Rosell (1902–1994), Cuban baseball player
- Ernst Rosell (1881–1953), Swedish sports shooter
- Francisco Romá y Rosell (born 1784), Spanish royal official in Valladolid and New Spain
- Josep Pons Rosell (born 1918), anthropologist and academic
- Kaj Rosell (born 1947), Danish chess master
- My Rosell (born 1984), Swedish politician
- Oriol Rosell (born 1992), Spanish footballer
- Rafael Rosell (born 1982), Filipino actor
- Rosell Ellis (born 1975), American basketball player
- Sandro Rosell (born 1964), former president of FC Barcelona

== See also ==
- Rossell
