= Argelita =

Coordinates: 40°03′N 0°21′W

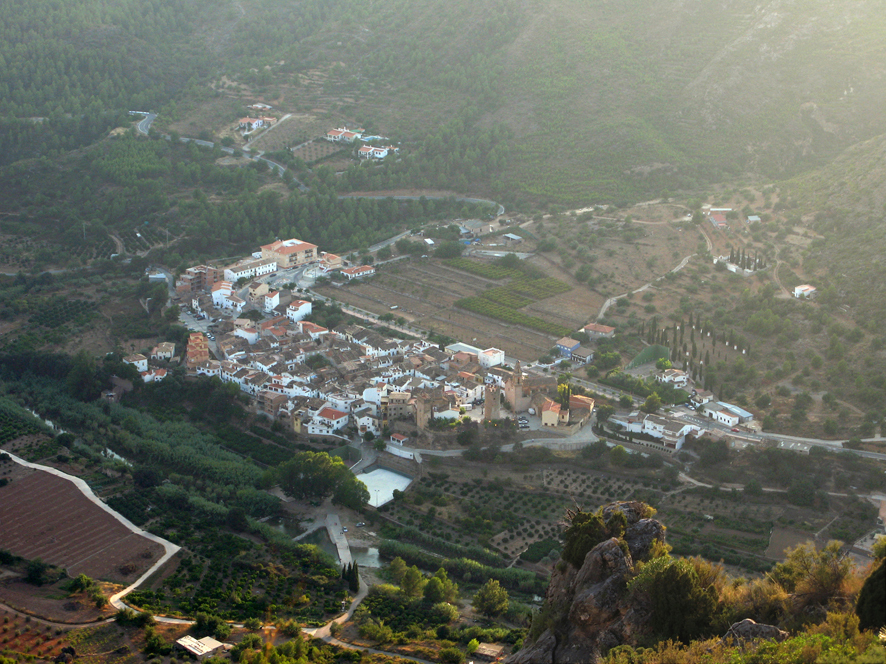
Aerial photo of Argelita and surroundings

Argelita's coat of arms

Argelita (Aragonese: Archelita, Catalan: Argeleta) is a municipality in the comarca of Alto Mijares, Castellón, Valencia, Spain. In 2015, it had a population of 147, located in the Alto Mijares region, next to the Argelita River or Villahermosa. Its term occupies 15.5 km2 and is 40 km from Castellón. It is located in the valley that forms the Villahermosa River and is surrounded by high mountains, as well as irrigated orchards that its inhabitants have been cultivating throughout history. Its pleasant temperature and its beautiful landscapes mean that its population increases significantly in summer.

Although registered as a predominantly Castilian-speaking municipality because it is the traditional language of the town center located on the Western river bank, the small settlements of La Laguna and La Canaleta on the Eastern river bank are traditionally Valencian-speaking.

== History ==
The municipality of Argelita, of Arab origin, belonged to Abu Zeyd in the thirteenth century who was the last Almohad governor of Valencia. His enemies cornered him and he finally retreated to the palace of this town, where he converted to Christianity giving his belongings to the church and the Christian nobility. After the Reconquista the municipality belonged to the Crown in 1491.

Later, the municipality passed into the hands of the Arenós family and on October 5, 1609, it was uninhabited. So on February 23, 1611, Mr. Pedro Escribá and Zapata, the new Lord of Argelita, granted Carta Pobla to 24 new families that repopulated the town.

Before being the province of Castellón, the Varonía de Argelita belonged to the Marquis of Monistrol within the government of Morella.

== See also ==
- List of municipalities in Castellón
