= Castillo de Villamalefa =

Coordinates: 40°8′N 0°23′W

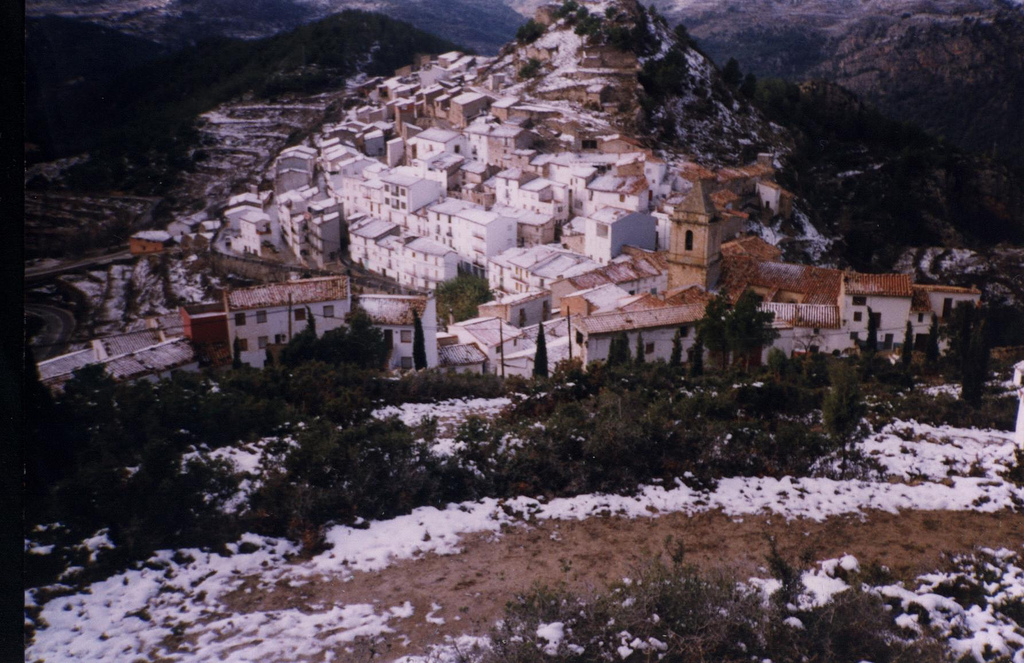

- Coat of arms

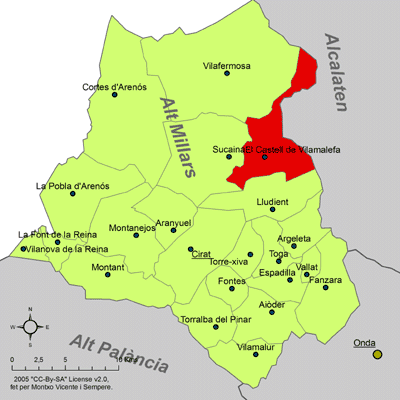
- Location of Castillo de Villamalefa in Alto Mijares.
- Country: Spain
- A. community: Valencian Community
- Province: Castellón
- Comarca: Alto Mijares
- Municipality: Castillo de Villamalefa

Government
  - Alcalde: Diego Gallén Bou (PP)

Area
  - Total: 37.7 km^{2} (14.6 sq mi)
- Elevation: 808 m (2,651 ft)

Population (2025-01-01)
  - Total: 110
  - Density: 2.9/km^{2} (7.6/sq mi)

Castillo de Villamalefa is a municipality of Spain in the Valencian Community, in the province of Castellón. It has a population of 104 (2005) and an area of 37.7 km².

== See also ==
- List of municipalities in Castellón
