= Arañuel =

- Municipality
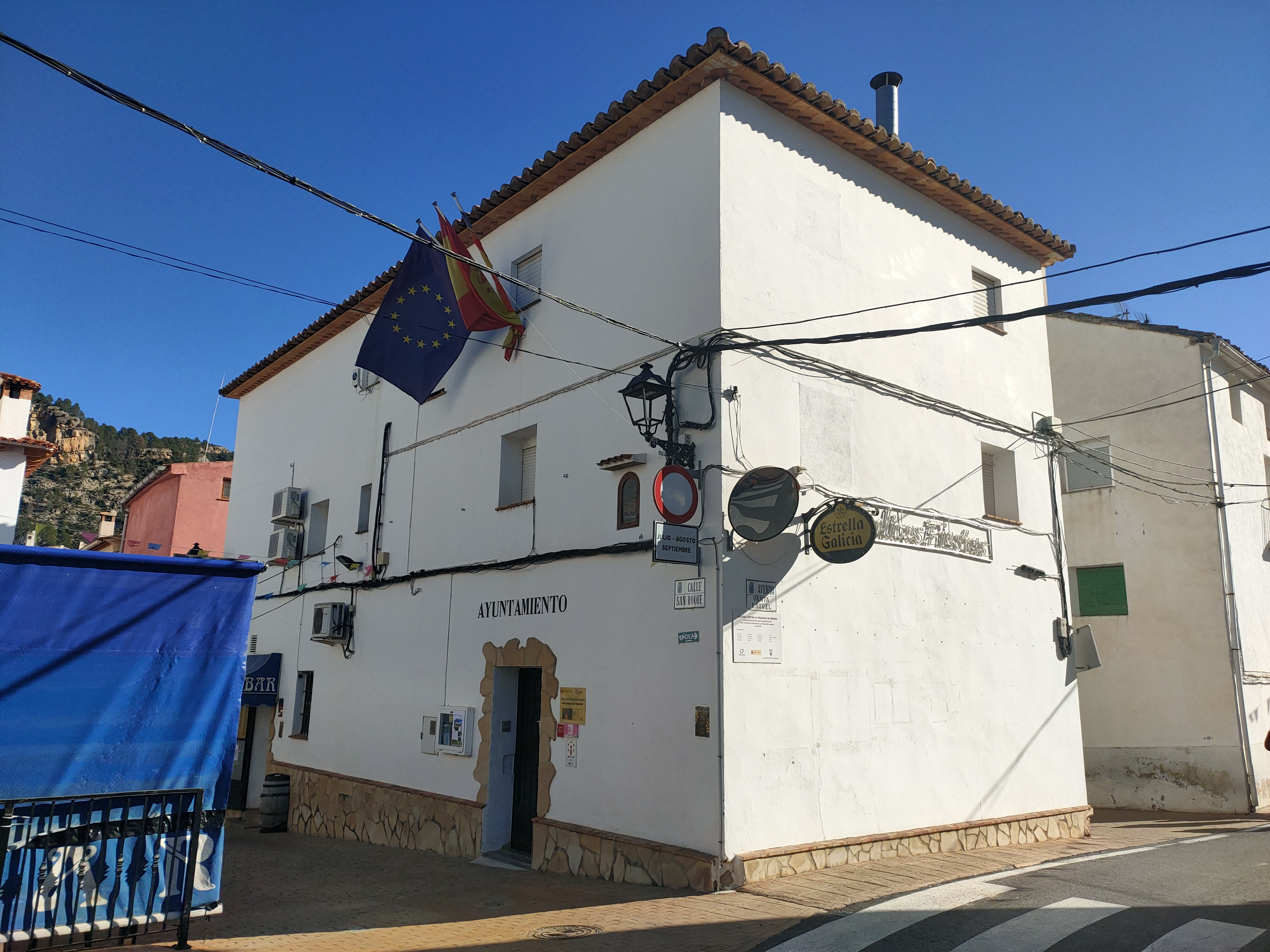
- Town hall

- Coat of arms

- Location of Arañuel. Arañuel (Valencian Community)
- Coordinates: 40°04′N 0°29′W
- Country: Spain
- Community: Valencia
- Province: Castellón
- Comarca: Alto Mijares

Government
  - Mayor: María del Roser Gimeno Amorós

Area
  - Total: 19.16 km^{2} (7.40 sq mi)

Population (2023)
  - Total: 165
  - Density: 8.61/km^{2} (22.3/sq mi)
- Time zone: UTC+1 (CET)
  - Summer (DST): UTC+2 (CEST)
- Postal code: 12232
- Website: www.aranuel.es

Arañuel (Aragonese: Aranyuel, Catalan: Aranyel) is a municipality in the comarca of Alto Mijares, Castellón, Valencia, Spain.

== See also ==
- List of municipalities in Castellón
