= Fanzara =

- Municipality
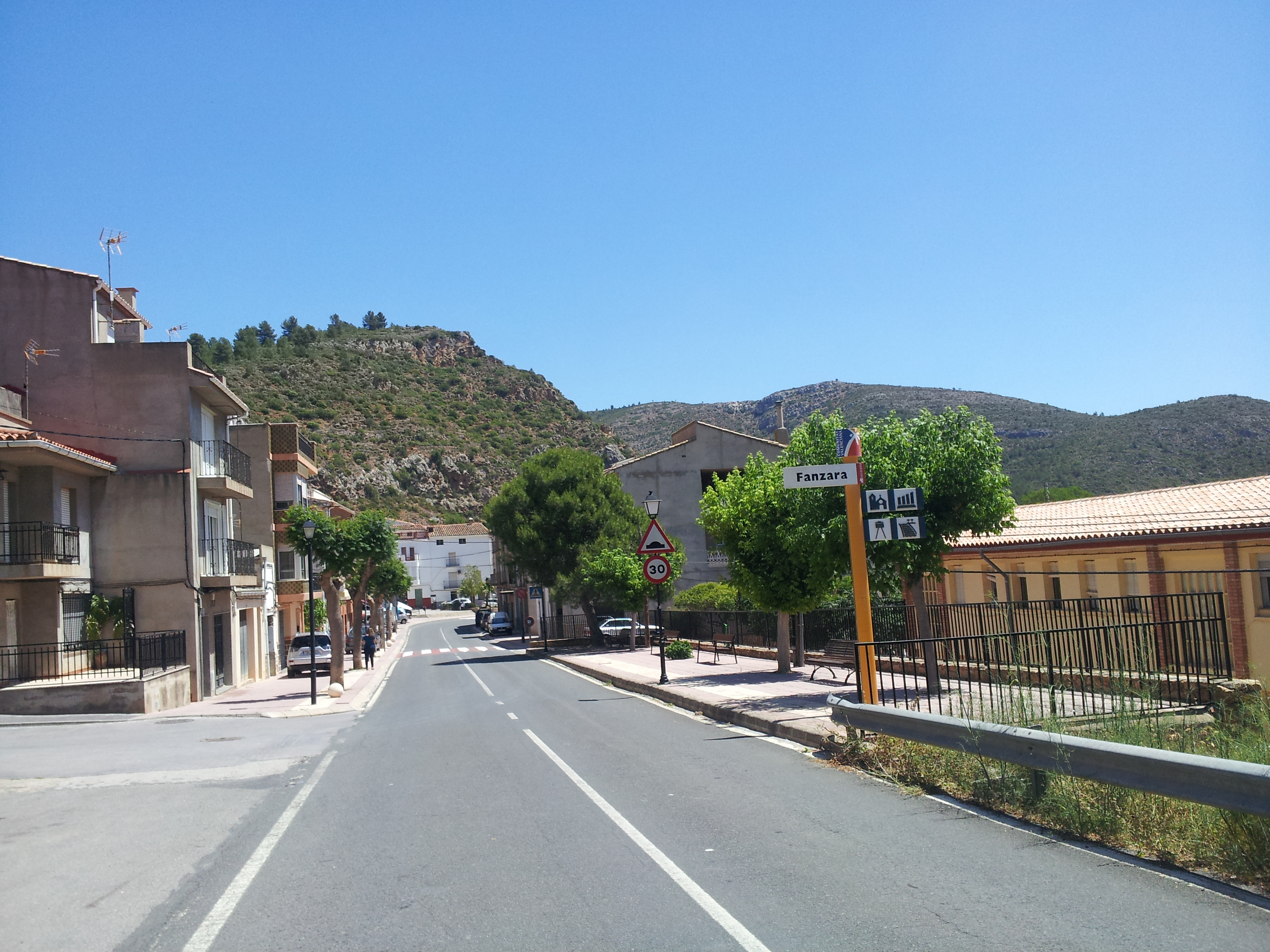
- View of Fanzara.

- Coat of arms

- Location of Fanzara. Fanzara (Valencian Community)
- Coordinates: 40°01′N 0°19′W
- Country: Spain
- Community: Valencia
- Province: Castellón
- Comarca: Alto Mijares

Government
  - Mayor: Marc Diago (PP)

Area
  - Total: 34.98 km^{2} (13.51 sq mi)

Population (2023)
  - Total: 294
  - Density: 8.40/km^{2} (21.8/sq mi)
- Time zone: UTC+1 (CET)
  - Summer (DST): UTC+2 (CEST)
- Postal code: 12230
- Website: www.fanzara.es

Fanzara is a municipality in the comarca of Alto Mijares, located in the province of Castellón, Valencia, Spain.

== See also ==
- List of municipalities in Castellón
