= Cortes de Arenoso =

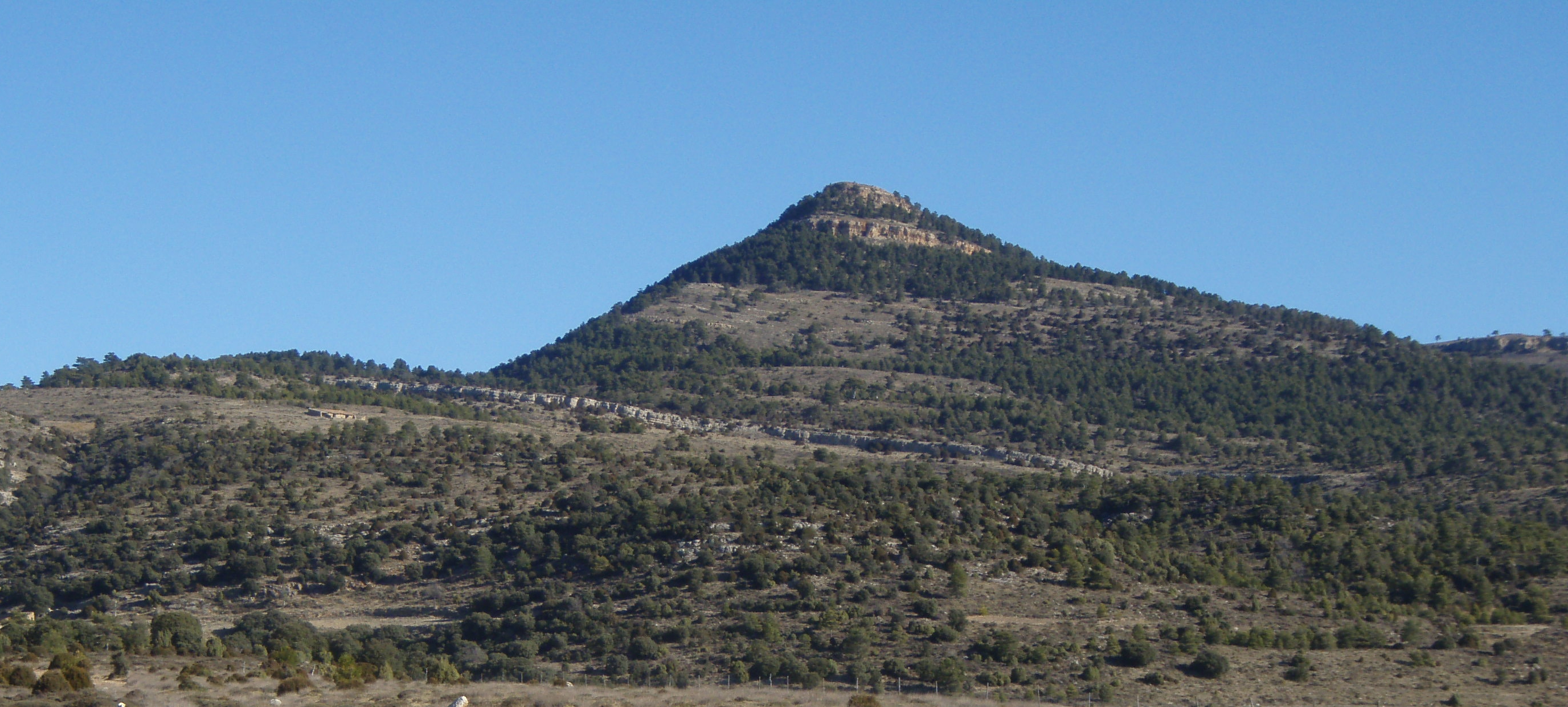
- The Cabezo de las Cruces, a 1,710 m high summit located close to Cortes de Arenoso in the border with Aragon

- Flag Coat of arms

- Location in Spain.
- Coordinates: 40°11′39″N 0°32′32″W
- Country: Spain
- A. community: Valencian Community
- Province: Castellón
- Comarca: Alto Mijares
- Municipality: Cortes de Arenoso

Government
  - Mayor: José Mata Sánchez

Area
  - Total: 80.6 km^{2} (31.1 sq mi)
- Elevation: 985 m (3,232 ft)

Population (2025-01-01)
  - Total: 308
  - Density: 3.82/km^{2} (9.90/sq mi)

Cortes de Arenoso (Aragonese: Cortz d'Arenoso, Catalan: Cortes d'Arenós) is a municipality of Spain in the Valencian Community, in the province of Castellón.

== See also ==
- List of municipalities in Castellón
