= Alto Mijares =

Coordinates: 40°03′19″N 0°27′48″W

Alto Mijares Alt Millars
- Comarca
- Country: Spain
- Autonomous community: Valencian Community
- Province: Castelló / Castellón
- Capital: Cirat
- Municipalities: 22 municipalities: Arañuel, Argelita, Ayódar, Castillo de Villamalefa, Cirat, Cortes de Arenoso, Espadilla, Fanzara, Fuente la Reina, Fuentes de Ayódar, Ludiente, Montán, Montanejos, Puebla de Arenoso, Toga, Torralba del Pinar, Torrechiva, Vallat, Villahermosa del Río, Villamalur, Villanueva de Viver, Zucaina

Area
  - Total: 667.06 km^{2} (257.55 sq mi)

Population (2019)
  - Total: 3,908
  - Density: 5.859/km^{2} (15.17/sq mi)
- Demonym
- Time zone: UTC+1 (CET)
  - Summer (DST): UTC+2 (CEST)
- Most populated municipality: Montanejos

Alto Mijares (Spanish: [ˈalto miˈxaɾes]; Valencian: Alt Millars [ˈald miˈʎaɾs]) is a comarca in the province of Castellón, Valencian Community, Spain. It is part of the Spanish-speaking area in the Valencian Community.

== Municipalities ==
The comarca consists of twenty-two municipalities, listed below with their populations:

Name	Population (2001)	Population (2011)	Population (2019)
Arañuel	187	199	150
Argelita	110	101	118
Ayódar	238	210	159
Castillo de Villamalefa	96	113	107
Cirat	237	258	201
Cortes de Arenoso	366	348	318
Espadilla	74	114	71
Fanzara	252	339	267
Fuente la Reina	32	60	52
Fuentes de Ayódar	101	151	87
Ludiente	209	191	141
Montán	326	415	370
Montanejos	414	614	572
Puebla de Arenoso	167	167	158
Toga	80	142	155
Torralba del Pinar	81	59	69
Torrechiva	87	96	81
Vallat	52	71	49
Villahermosa del Río	442	498	489
Villamalur	108	93	62
Villanueva de Viver	74	77	61
Zucaina	197	184	171
Totals	3,930	4,500	3,908

Municipalities of Alto Mijares
