= Villanueva de Viver =

- Municipality
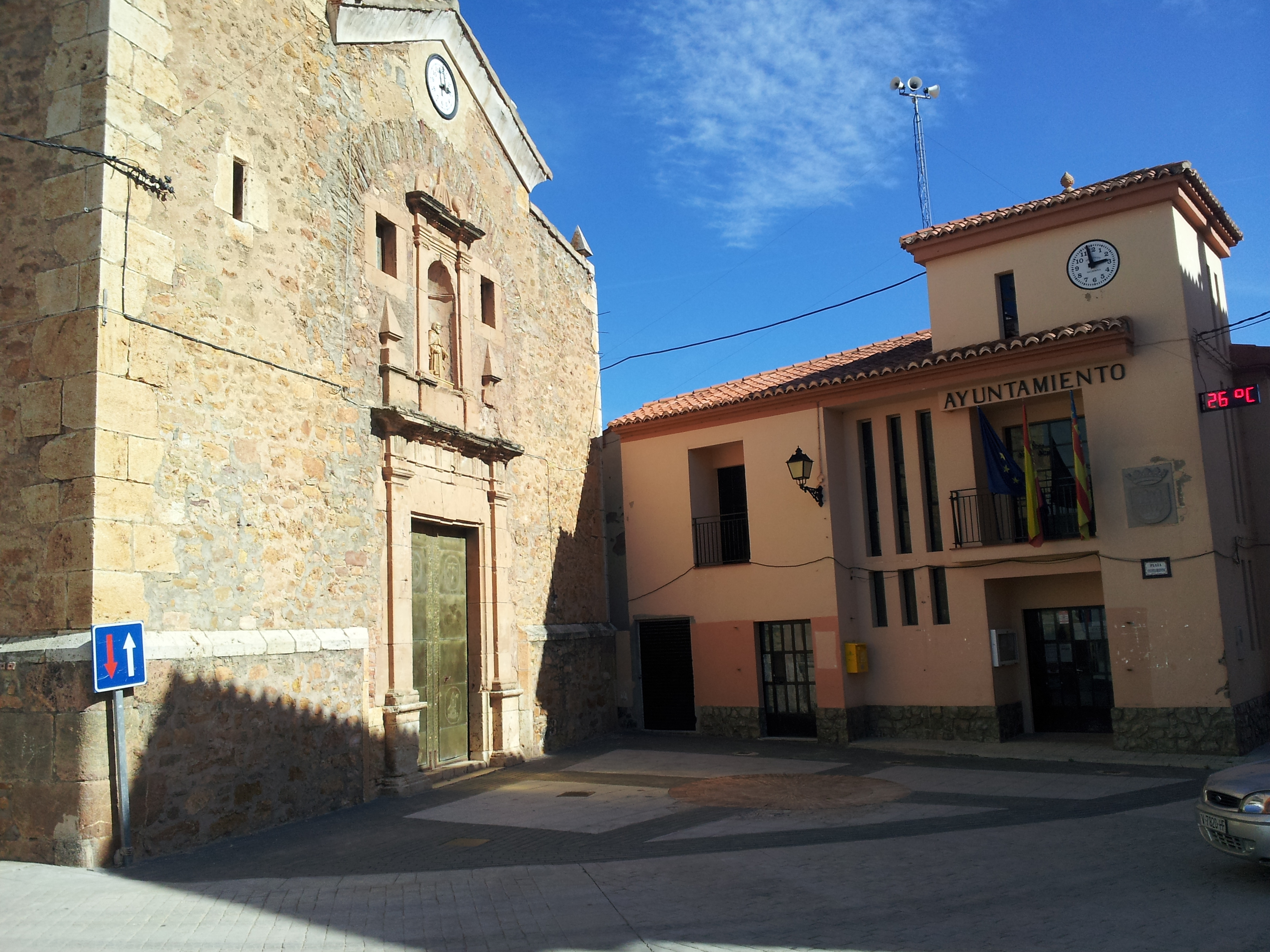
- Town Hall and Church Square in Villanueva de Viver.

- Flag Coat of arms

- Location of Villanueva de Viver. Villanueva de Viver (Valencian Community)
- Coordinates: 40°03′N 0°39′W
- Country: Spain
- Community: Valencia
- Province: Castellón
- Comarca: Alto Mijares

Government
  - Mayor: Reinaldo Pastor Gascó (PSOE)

Area
  - Total: 5.87 km^{2} (2.27 sq mi)

Population (2023)
  - Total: 110
  - Density: 19/km^{2} (49/sq mi)
- Time zone: UTC+1 (CET)
  - Summer (DST): UTC+2 (CEST)
- Postal code: 12428
- Website: villanuevadeviver.es

Villanueva de Viver is a municipality in the comarca of Alto Mijares, Castellón, Valencia, Spain.
