= La Serratella =

- Municipality and town
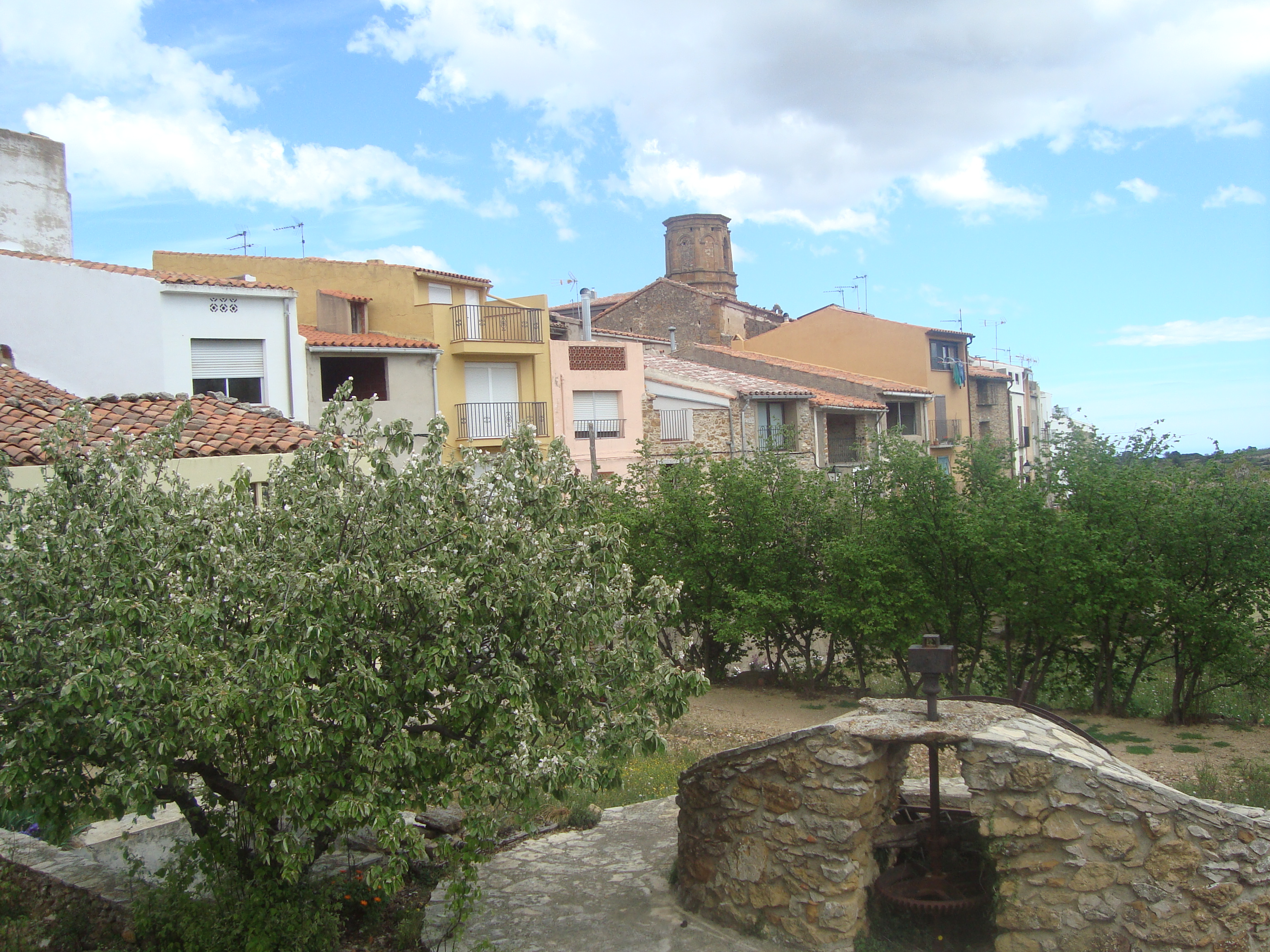

- Flag Coat of arms
- Interactive map of La Serratella
- Coordinates: 40°18′46″N 0°1′48″E
- Country: Spain
- Autonomous community: Valencian Community
- Province: Castellón
- Comarca: Plana Alta

Area
  - Total: 18.8 km^{2} (7.3 sq mi)
- Elevation: 781 m (2,562 ft)

Population (2025-01-01)
  - Total: 113
  - Density: 6.01/km^{2} (15.6/sq mi)
- Time zone: UTC+1 (CET)
  - Summer (DST): UTC+2 (CEST)
- Postal code: 12184
- Website: http://www.sarratella.es

La Serratella is a municipality located in the province of Castellón, Valencian Community, Spain.
