= Vallat =

- Municipality
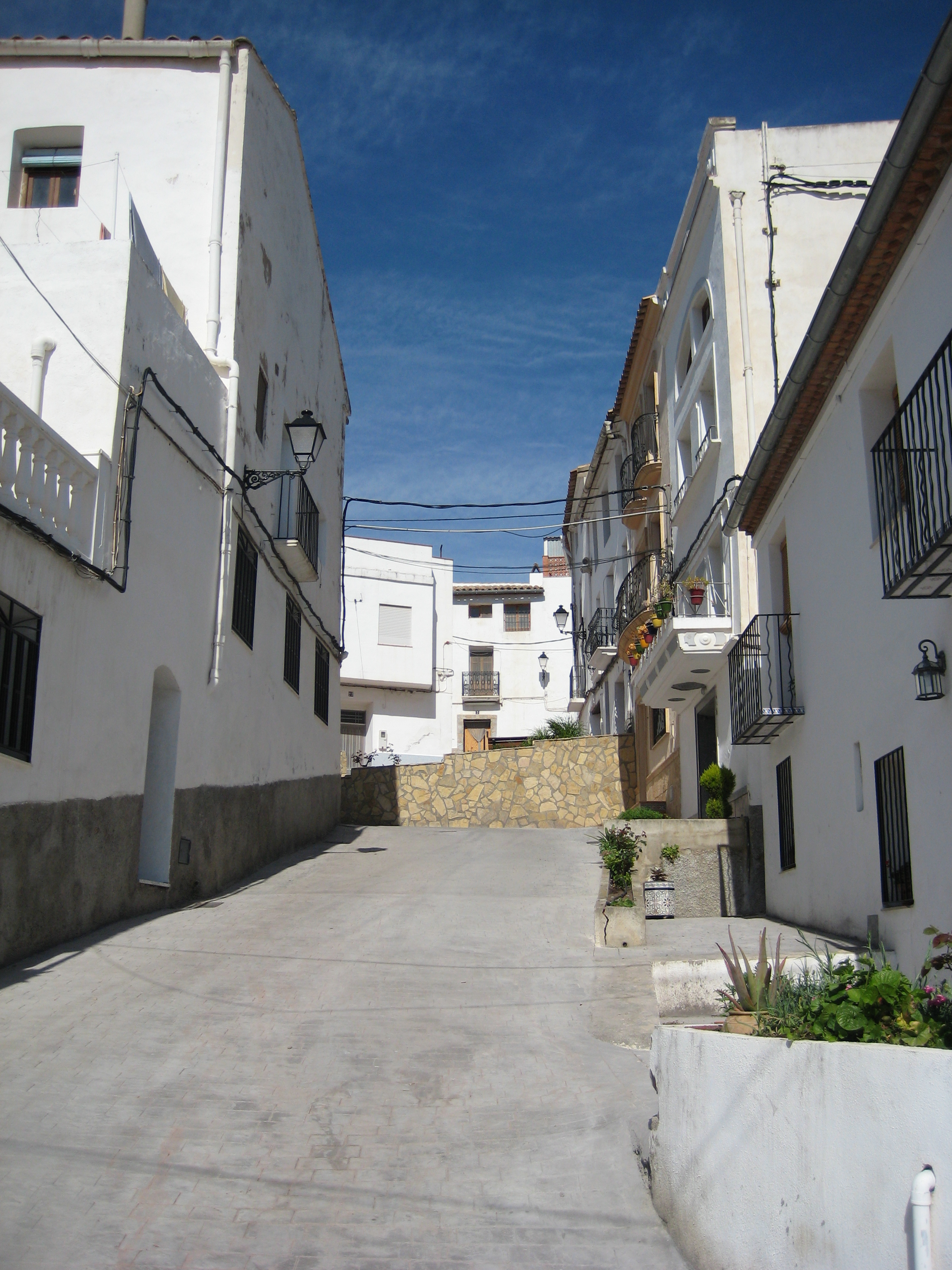
- A street of Vallat.

- Coat of arms

- Location of Vallat. Vallat (Valencian Community)
- Coordinates: 40.031°N 0.337°W
- Country: Spain
- Community: Valencia
- Province: Castellón
- Comarca: Alto Mijares

Government
  - Mayor: Esther Gómez Pitarch (Compromís)

Area
  - Total: 5.01 km^{2} (1.93 sq mi)

Population (2023)
  - Total: 66
  - Density: 13/km^{2} (34/sq mi)
- Time zone: UTC+1 (CET)
  - Summer (DST): UTC+2 (CEST)
- Postal code: 12230
- Website: www.vallat.es

Vallat is a municipality in the comarca of Alto Mijares, Castellón, Valencia, Spain.
