= Rossell =

Rossell (Eastern Catalan: [ruˈseʎ]) is a surname of Catalan origin. A variant is Rosell. Notable people with the surname include:

- Alexis Rossell (born 1951), Venezuelan harpist and folk musician
- Juan Rossell (born 1969), Cuban volleyball player
- Marina Rossell (born 1954), Spanish singer
- Susan Rossell, British neuropsychologist
- William Trent Rossell (1849–1919), American army officer in the U.S. Army Corps of Engineers

Also, as Røssell, a Danish name:

- Dorthe Emilie Røssell (born 1934), Danish author and resistance member during the Second World War

== See also ==
- Rosell, a surname
