= Villamalur =

- municipality
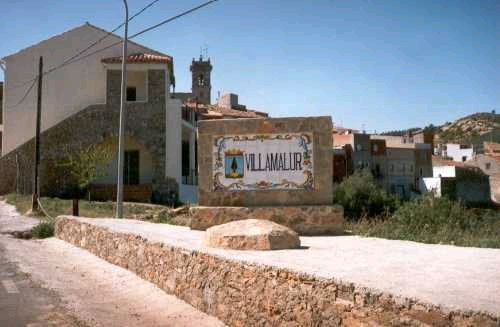

- Coat of arms

- Location in Spain.
- Coordinates: 39°57′52″N 0°23′43″W
- Country: Spain
- Autonomous community: Valencian Community
- Province: Castellón
- Comarca: Alto Mijares

Government
  - Mayor: Lorenzo Gimeno Alegre

Area
  - Total: 19.50 km^{2} (7.53 sq mi)
- Elevation: 644 m (2,113 ft)

Population (2025-01-01)
  - Total: 99
  - Density: 5.1/km^{2} (13/sq mi)
- Time zone: UTC+1 (CET)
  - Summer (DST): UTC+2 (CEST)

Villamalur is a municipality in the comarca of Alto Mijares, province of Castellón, Valencian Community, southern Spain.

Sights include the castle, with an irregularly polygonal plan (10th–13th century)

== History ==
The origins of the town are unknown, although it has been supposed that it grew around the Moorish castle located nearby. In 1236 it was part of the possessions of Zayd Abu Zayd, the last Almohad governor of Valencia. Later it was a center of the Moriscos, but after their suppression it was repopulated by people from Castile during the first half of the 17th century.
