= Villahermosa del Río =

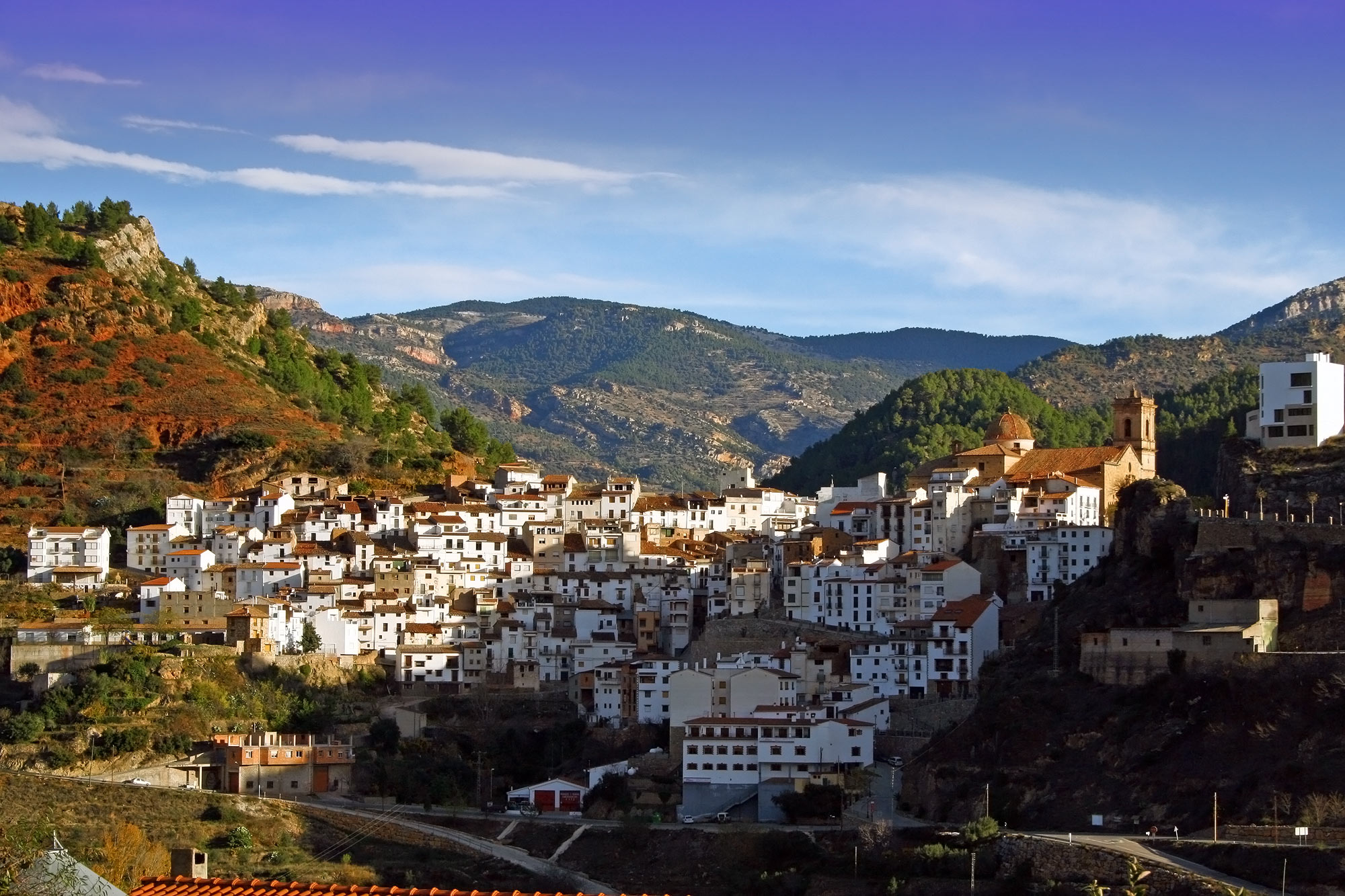

- Coat of arms

- Location in Spain.
- Coordinates: 40°12′N 0°25′W
- Country: Spain
- A. community: Valencian Community
- Province: Castellón
- Comarca: Alto Mijares

Government
  - Mayor: Luis Rubio Catalán

Area
  - Total: 108.9 km^{2} (42.0 sq mi)
- Elevation: 755 m (2,477 ft)

Population (2025-01-01)
  - Total: 473
  - Density: 4.34/km^{2} (11.2/sq mi)

Villahermosa del Río is a municipality in the comarca of Alto Mijares, Castellón, Valencia, Spain.
