= Torralba del Pinar =

- Municipality
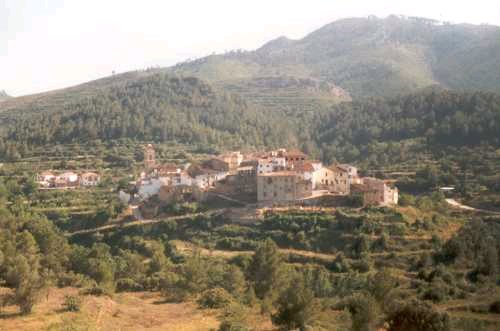
- Panoramic view of Torralba del Pinar.

- Coat of arms

- Location of Torralba del Pinar. Torralba del Pinar (Valencian Community)
- Coordinates: 39°59′N 0°26′W
- Country: Spain
- Community: Valencia
- Province: Castellón
- Comarca: Alto Mijares

Area
  - Total: 21.19 km^{2} (8.18 sq mi)

Population (2023)
  - Total: 69
  - Density: 3.3/km^{2} (8.4/sq mi)
- Time zone: UTC+1 (CET)
  - Summer (DST): UTC+2 (CEST)
- Postal code: 12225
- Website: www.torralbadelpinar.es

Torralba del Pinar is a municipality in the comarca of Alto Mijares, Castellón, Valencia, Spain.
