= Toga, Spain =

Toga
- Municipality
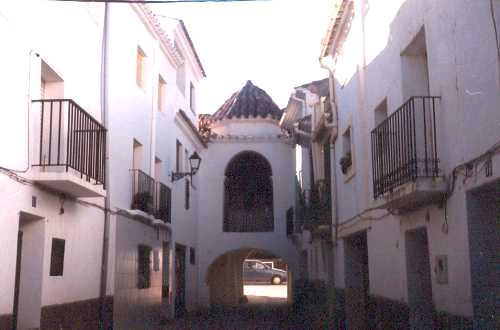
- View of Toga.

- Flag Coat of arms

- Location of Toga. Toga (Valencian Community)
- Coordinates: 40°03′N 0°22′W
- Country: Spain
- Community: Valencia
- Province: Castellón
- Comarca: Alto Mijares

Area
  - Total: 13.52 km^{2} (5.22 sq mi)

Population (2023)
  - Total: 112
  - Density: 8.28/km^{2} (21.5/sq mi)
- Time zone: UTC+1 (CET)
  - Summer (DST): UTC+2 (CEST)
- Postal code: 12230
- Website: www.toga.es

Toga is a municipality in the comarca of Alto Mijares, Castellón, Valencia, Spain.
