= Torrechiva =

- Municipality
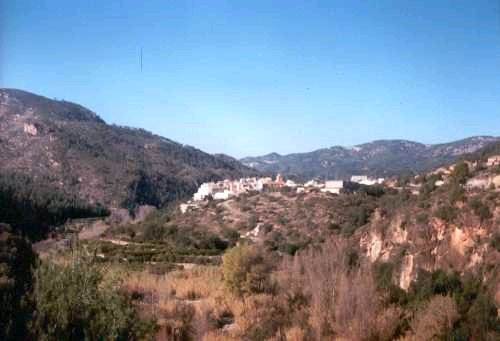
- View of Torrechiva.

- Flag Coat of arms

- Location of Torrechiva. Torrechiva (Valencian Community)
- Coordinates: 40°03′N 0°24′W
- Country: Spain
- Community: Valencia
- Province: Castellón
- Comarca: Alto Mijares

Government
  - Mayor: Esteban Salas Guillamón (PP)

Area
  - Total: 11.85 km^{2} (4.58 sq mi)

Population (2023)
  - Total: 114
  - Density: 9.62/km^{2} (24.9/sq mi)
- Time zone: UTC+1 (CET)
  - Summer (DST): UTC+2 (CEST)
- Postal code: 12232
- Website: www.torrechiva.es

Torrechiva is a municipality in the comarca of Alto Mijares, Castellón, Valencia, Spain.
