= Lucena del Cid =

Lucena del Cid Llucena
- Municipality
- Llucena / Lucena del Cid
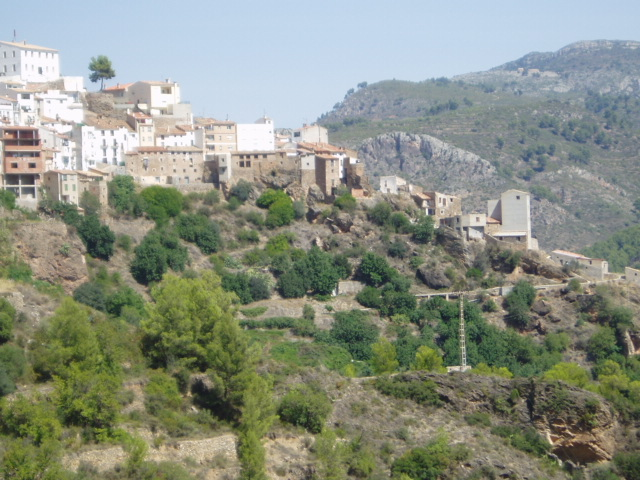

- Coat of arms

- Location in Spain Lucena del Cid (Valencian Community) Lucena del Cid (Spain)
- Coordinates: 40°16′35″N 0°12′34″W
- Country: Spain
- Autonomous community: Valencian Community
- Province: Castellón
- Comarca: Alcalatén
- Judicial district: Castelló de la Plana

Government
  - Mayor: Vicente Nebot Gargallo

Area
  - Total: 137 km^{2} (53 sq mi)
- Elevation: 568 m (1,864 ft)

Population (2025-01-01)
  - Total: 1,421
  - Density: 10.4/km^{2} (26.9/sq mi)
- Demonym(s): Llucener, llucenera
- Time zone: UTC+1 (CET)
  - Summer (DST): UTC+2 (CEST)
- Postal code: 12120
- Official language(s): Valencian
- Website: Official website

Lucena del Cid (in Valencian and also official: Llucena) is a municipality in the comarca of Alcalatén, province of Castellon, Valencian Community, Spain.

== See also ==
- List of municipalities in Castellón
