= Province of Castellón =

Province of Spain

Province of Castellón Provincia de Castellón (Spanish) Província de Castelló (Valencian)
- Province
- Coat of arms

- Location of the Province of Castellón in Spain
- Coordinates: 40°10′N 0°10′W
- Country: Spain
- Autonomous community: Valencian Community
- Capital: Castellón de la Plana
- Municipalities: 135

Government
  - Presidenta: Marta Barrachina Mateu

Area
  - Total: 6,633.98 km^{2} (2,561.39 sq mi)
  - Rank: 38th in Spain

Population (2025)
  - Total: 627,620
  - Rank: 26th in Spain
  - Density: 94.607/km^{2} (245.03/sq mi)
- Demonym(s): •castellonense (es) •castellonenc, -ca (va)
- Time zone: UTC+1 (CET)
  - Summer (DST): UTC+2 (CEST)
- Official language(s): Spanish and Valencian
- Parliament: Cortes Generales
- Website: www.dipcas.es

The Province of Castellón (Spanish: Provincia de Castellón [kasteˈʎon]; Valencian: Província de Castelló [kasteˈʎo]) is a province in the northern part of the Valencian Community in Spain. Its capital is the city of Castellón de la Plana. Other major cities of the province include Vila-real, Borriana, La Vall d'Uixó and Vinaròs.

It is bordered by the provinces of Valencia to the south, Teruel to the west, Tarragona to the north, and by the Mediterranean Sea to the east. The western side of the province is in the mountainous Sistema Ibérico area.

The province has a population of 627,620 in an area of 6,633.98 square kilometres (2,561.39 sq mi) across its 135 municipalities.

== Geography ==
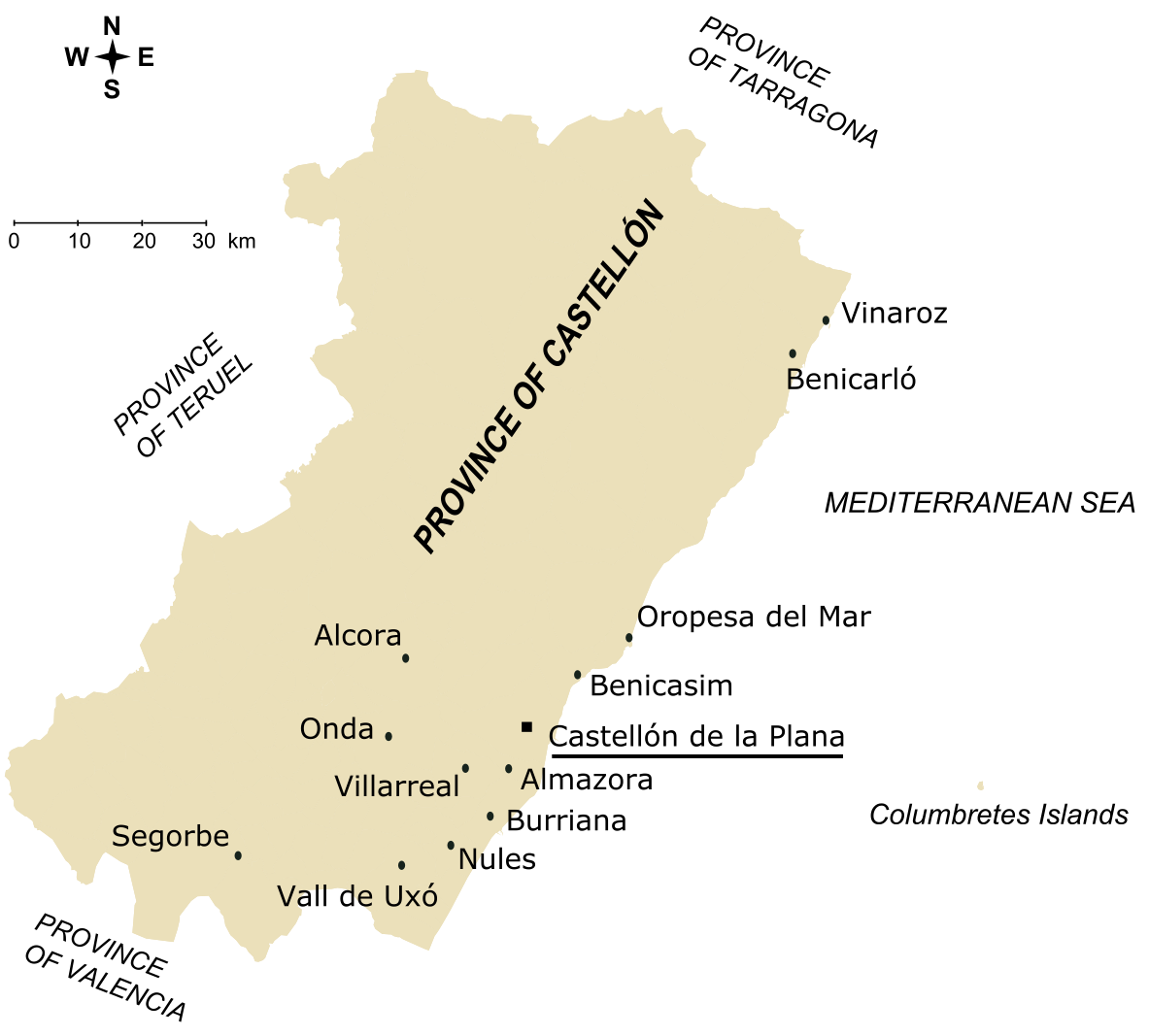
Towns with a population greater than 7,000 in the province (2005)

Castellón is the home of Penyagolosa, the highest mountain of the province and the second highest one in the Valencian Community. It is widely considered to be one of the most emblematic Valencian mountains.

The Greenwich Meridian (the Prime Meridian) passes through the province; there are localities with commemorative monuments such as La Pobla Tornesa, Castellón or Almassora (Paseo Marítimo), and in Castellon it intersects the 40th parallel, and the exact point can be visited at the Meridian Park.

== Municipalities ==
The province has 135 municipalities:

- Aín
- Albocàsser
- Alcalà de Xivert
- L'Alcora
- Alcudia de Veo
- Alfondeguilla
- Algimia de Almonacid
- Almassora
- Almedíjar
- Almenara
- Les Alqueries
- Altura
- Arañuel
- Ares del Maestrat
- Argelita
- Artana
- Atzeneta del Maestrat
- Ayódar
- Azuébar
- Barracas
- Bejís
- Benafer
- Benafigos
- Benassal
- Benicarló
- Benicàssim
- Benlloc
- Betxí
- Burriana
- Borriol
- Cabanes
- Càlig
- Canet lo Roig
- Castell de Cabres
- Castellfort
- Castellnovo
- Castellón de la Plana
- Castillo de Villamalefa
- Catí
- Caudiel
- Cervera del Maestre
- Chóvar
- Cinctorres
- Cirat
- Cortes de Arenoso
- Costur
- Les Coves de Vinromà
- Culla
- Eslida
- Espadilla
- Fanzara
- Figueroles
- Forcall
- Fuente la Reina
- Fuentes de Ayódar
- Gaibiel
- Geldo
- Herbers
- Higueras
- La Jana
- Jérica
- La Llosa
- Lucena del Cid
- Ludiente
- La Mata de Morella
- Matet
- Moncofa
- Montán
- Montanejos
- Morella
- Navajas
- Nules
- Olocau del Rey
- Onda
- Oropesa del Mar
- Palanques
- Pavías
- Peniscola
- Pina de Montalgrao
- La Pobla de Benifassà
- La Pobla Tornesa
- Portell de Morella
- Puebla de Arenoso
- Ribesalbes
- Rossell
- Sacañet
- La Salzadella
- San Rafael del Río
- Sant Joan de Moró
- Sant Jordi / San Jorge
- Sant Mateu
- Santa Magdalena de Polpís
- Segorbe
- La Serratella
- La Serra d'en Galceran
- Soneja
- Sot de Ferrer
- Suera / Sueras
- Tales
- Teresa
- Tírig
- La Todolella
- Toga
- Torás
- El Toro
- Torralba del Pinar
- Torreblanca
- Torrechiva
- La Torre d'en Besora
- La Torre d'en Doménec
- Traiguera
- Les Useres
- Vall d'Alba
- Vall de Almonacid
- La Vall d'Uixó
- Vallat
- Vallibona
- Vilafamés
- Vilafranca
- Vilanova d'Alcolea
- Vilar de Canes
- Villarreal
- La Vilavella
- Villahermosa del Río
- Villamalur
- Villanueva de Viver
- Villores
- Vinaròs
- Vistabella del Maestrat
- Viver
- Xilxes/Chilches
- Xert
- Xodos / Chodos
- Zorita del Maestrazgo
- Zucaina

== Comarques ==
The province is historically subdivided into 8 comarques:

- Alcalatén
- Alt Maestrat
- Alto Mijares
- Alto Palancia
- Baix Maestrat
- Plana Alta
- Plana Baixa
- Ports

== Demographics ==
Historical population
Year	Pop.	±%
1842	203,063	—
1857	260,919	+28.5%
1877	288,765	+10.7%
1887	292,822	+1.4%
1900	318,260	+8.7%
1910	334,181	+5.0%
1920	325,211	−2.7%
1930	317,899	−2.2%
1940	320,443	+0.8%
1950	330,257	+3.1%
1960	342,649	+3.8%
1970	386,516	+12.8%
1981	431,893	+11.7%
1991	446,744	+3.4%
2001	484,566	+8.5%
2011	594,423	+22.7%
2021	587,632	−1.1%
Source: INE

As of 2025, the population is 627,620, of which 49.7% are male, and 50.3% are female. Minors make up 16.9% of the population, and seniors make up 20.3%.

=== Immigration ===
As of 2025, immigrants make up 21.8% of the population. The 5 largest foreign countries of birth are Romania, Morocco, Colombia, Venezuela, and Argentina.

== Economy ==
Traditionally, the economy of Castellón has been focused on the production of citrus and vegetables (Nules and Benicarló). Since the 17th century, Castellón has developed an important ceramic and ceramic tile industry (Onda, L'Alcora, Nules, Castellón de la Plana and Vila-real) and nowadays most of the Spanish tile producers are concentrated in the province. Also, furniture (Benicarló and Vinaròs) and chemical industries (Benicarló and Castellón) are present. There is a large oil refinery in Castellón de la Plana.

Traditional industries such as shoe and footwear (La Vall d'Uixó), fishing (Castellón, Vinaròs) and textiles (Vilafranca and Morella), have given way to a service-based economy due to the increasing importance of tourism in the economy of the province.

The province, and in particular its idle large airport, has become a symbol of the wasteful spending prior to the 2008-2014 Spanish financial crisis.

=== Tourism ===
The Province of Castellón has varied landscapes and heritage that supports a growing tourist industry. The largest seaside and beach resorts include Benicàssim, Orpesa, Vinaròs, Borriana, Peníscola, Benicarló, etc. There are opportunities for rural tourism in the interior, as well as monumental towns like Morella, Vilafamés, Sant Mateu, Segorbe, mineral springs at Montanejos, Benassal, Catí, etc.

More than 50% of the hotel beds are concentrated in Peniscola, which is the third most popular tourist destination in the Valencian Community after Benidorm and Valencia.
