= Montán =

- Flag Coat of arms

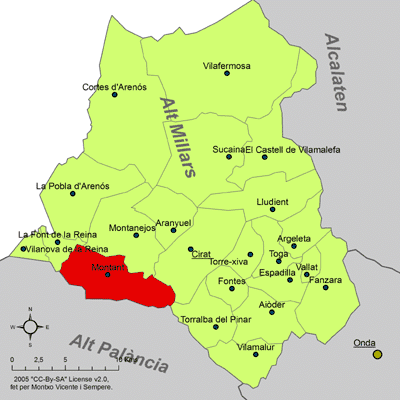
- Montán in Alto Mijares Shire

- Location of Montán in the Province of Castellón Location of Montán in the Valencian Community Location of Montán in Spain
- Coordinates: 40°2′7″N 0°33′18″W
- Country: Spain
- Autonomous Community: Valencian Community
- Province: Castellón
- Comarca: Alto Mijares

Government
  - Mayor: Antonio Fornás Tuzón

Area
  - Total: 34.1 km^{2} (13.2 sq mi)
- Elevation: 580 m (1,900 ft)

Population (2025-01-01)
  - Total: 429
  - Density: 12.6/km^{2} (32.6/sq mi)
- Demonym: Gabacho/a
- Postal code: 12447
- Website: www.montan.es

Montán is a municipality in the comarca of Alto Mijares, Castellón, Valencia, Spain.

== See also ==
- List of municipalities of Spain
- Municipalities of Spain
