= Ludiente =

- Municipality
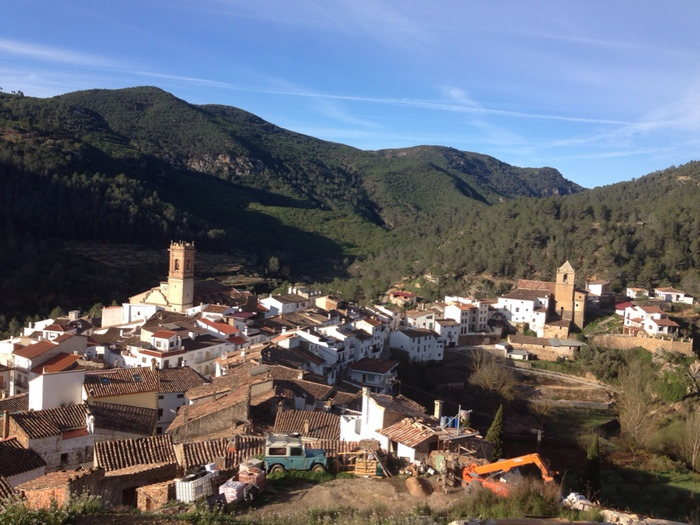
- Aerial view of Ludiente.

- Coat of arms

- Location of Ludiente. Ludiente (Valencian Community)
- Coordinates: 40°05′N 0°22′W
- Country: Spain
- Community: Valencia
- Province: Castellón
- Comarca: Alto Mijares

Government
  - Mayor: Guillermo Manuel Llorens Sanz (PSOE)

Area
  - Total: 31.35 km^{2} (12.10 sq mi)

Population (2023)
  - Total: 155
  - Density: 4.94/km^{2} (12.8/sq mi)
- Time zone: UTC+1 (CET)
  - Summer (DST): UTC+2 (CEST)
- Postal code: 12123
- Website: www.ludiente.es

Ludiente is a village in the district of Alto Mijares, Castellón, Valencia, Spain.
