= Susan Rossell =

Professor Susan Rossell
- Citizenship: British/Australian
- Education: University of Manchester, Institute of Psychiatry King's College London, University of Oxford
- Known for: Neuroimaging, Neuropsychology
- Scientific career
- Fields: Neuropsychology
- Workplaces: Swinburne University

Professor Susan Rossell is a British researcher based at Swinburne University of Technology specialising in Neuropsychology and Neuroimaging. Originally from Nottingham, UK; she now resides in Melbourne, Australia. Her research on the neuropsychology of schizophrenia and body dysmorphic disorder is internationally recognised.

== Early life and education ==
Rossell spent her childhood in Nottingham. She is the daughter of Anthony and Penny Rossell. She has two younger brothers, John and Paul. Rossell attended The Gedling School and Forest Fields School in Nottingham, UK. She gained a Bachelor of Psychology and Neuroscience (Hons) from the University of Manchester and a Doctor of Philosophy in Cognitive Neuropsychiatry from the Institute of Psychiatry King's College London; both UK.

== Career ==
After her doctorate Rossell spent two years as a postdoctoral researcher within Experimental Psychology at the University of Oxford (1998-2000) and collaborated with the Functional Imaging Laboratory in Queens Square. During this time she completed one of the first known studies to look at brain function using functional magnetic resonance imaging (fMRI) and event related potentials (ERPs). Subsequently, she was awarded a prestigious Wellcome Trust International Travel Fellowship (2000-2004) and was based at Macquarie University in Sydney, Australia within their Macquarie Centre for Cognitive Sciences (MACCS), as well as at the Institute of Psychiatry in London. The focus of her fellowship was to improve our understanding of thought disorder in schizophrenia and bipolar disorder using clinical interviews, psycholinguistics, cognitive assessments and brain imaging.

Rossell became the Head of the Cognitive Neuropsychiatry at the Mental Health Research Institute of Victoria, Melbourne from 2004 to 2007. She moved to the Monash Alfred Psychiatry Research Centre in 2008 and was an adjunct member until 2018

In 2010, she was appointed to a tenured chair in Neuropsychology at Swinburne University of Technology. Rossell was the inaugural Director of Neuroimaging from 2011 to 2017, she was subsequently the inaugural Director of the Centre for Mental Health (CMH) in 2018. In January 2019 she stepped down from her CMH Directorship as she was awarded an NHMRC Senior Research Fellowship.

Rossell has served as a Section Editor of the European Journal of Neuroscience (EJN) since 2015.

== Research ==
Over the last 20 years, Rossell has published more than 250 peer-reviewed scientific papers and book chapters. She has established an internationally recognised group in the fields of schizophrenia and body dysmorphic disorder research, particularly the neuropsychology and neuroimaging of the disorders.

She applies structural and functional brain imaging to psychiatric disorders and has received funding from the NHMRC and The Wellcome Trust. She has presented talks in the UK and Europe.

== Personal ==
Rossell has a daughter, Madalyn.

== Awards ==
- 1999: International Congress of Schizophrenia Research Young Investigator Award
- 2002: Winter workshop on Schizophrenia Research Young Investigator Award
- 2004: Winter workshop on Schizophrenia Research Special Investigator Award
