= Puebla de Arenoso =

Coordinates: 40°06′N 0°35′W

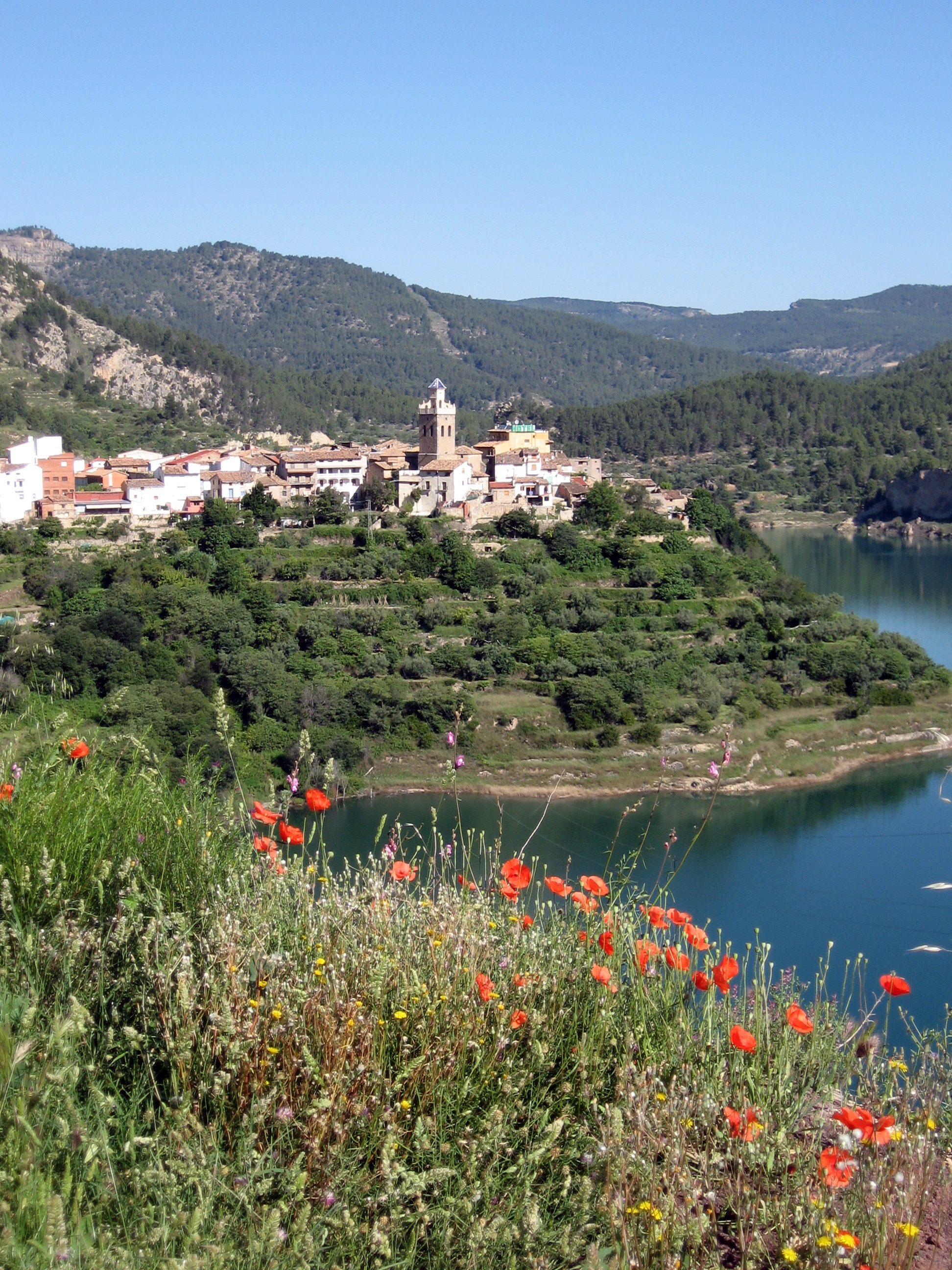
Puebla de Arenosa above Montanejos

Puebla de Arenoso's flag

Puebla de Arenoso's coat of arms

Puebla de Arenoso is a municipality in the comarca of Alto Mijares, Castellón, Valencia, Spain.
