= Espadilla =

- Municipality of Cebu
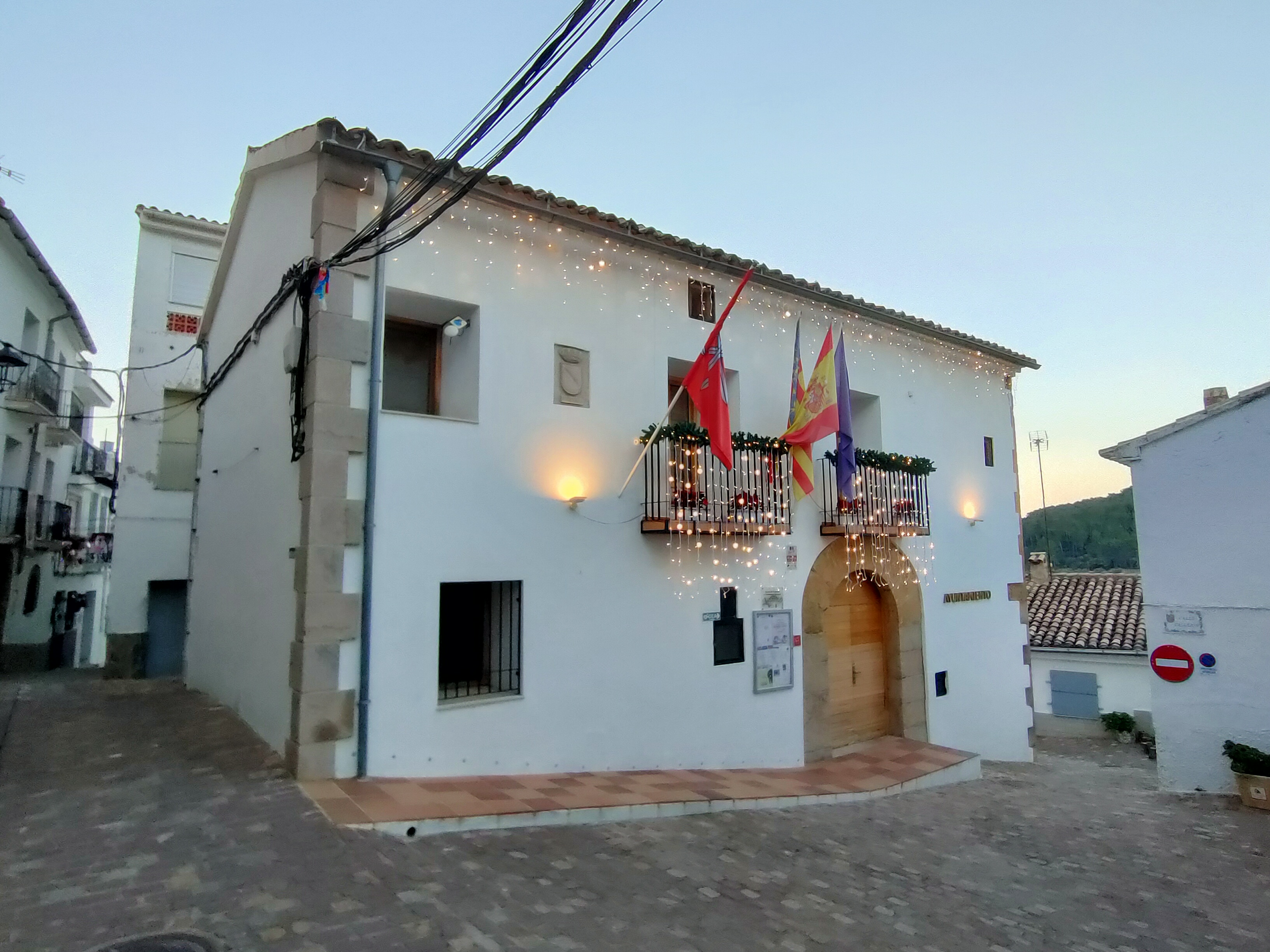
- Town hall

- Flag Coat of arms

- Location in Spain
- Coordinates: 40°1′35″N 0°21′20″W
- Country: Spain
- Autonomous community: Valencian Community
- Province: Castellón
- Comarca: Alto Mijares
- Judicial district: Nules

Government
  - Alcalde: Vicente D. Silvestre Ortells

Area
  - Total: 12 km^{2} (4.6 sq mi)
- Elevation: 294 m (965 ft)

Population (2025-01-01)
  - Total: 101
  - Density: 8.4/km^{2} (22/sq mi)
- Demonym: Espadillanos
- Time zone: UTC+1 (CET)
  - Summer (DST): UTC+2 (CEST)
- Postal code: 12230
- Official language(s): Spanish
- Website: Official website

Espadilla is a municipality in the comarca of Alto Mijares in the Valencian Community, Spain.
