= Montanejos =

- Municipality
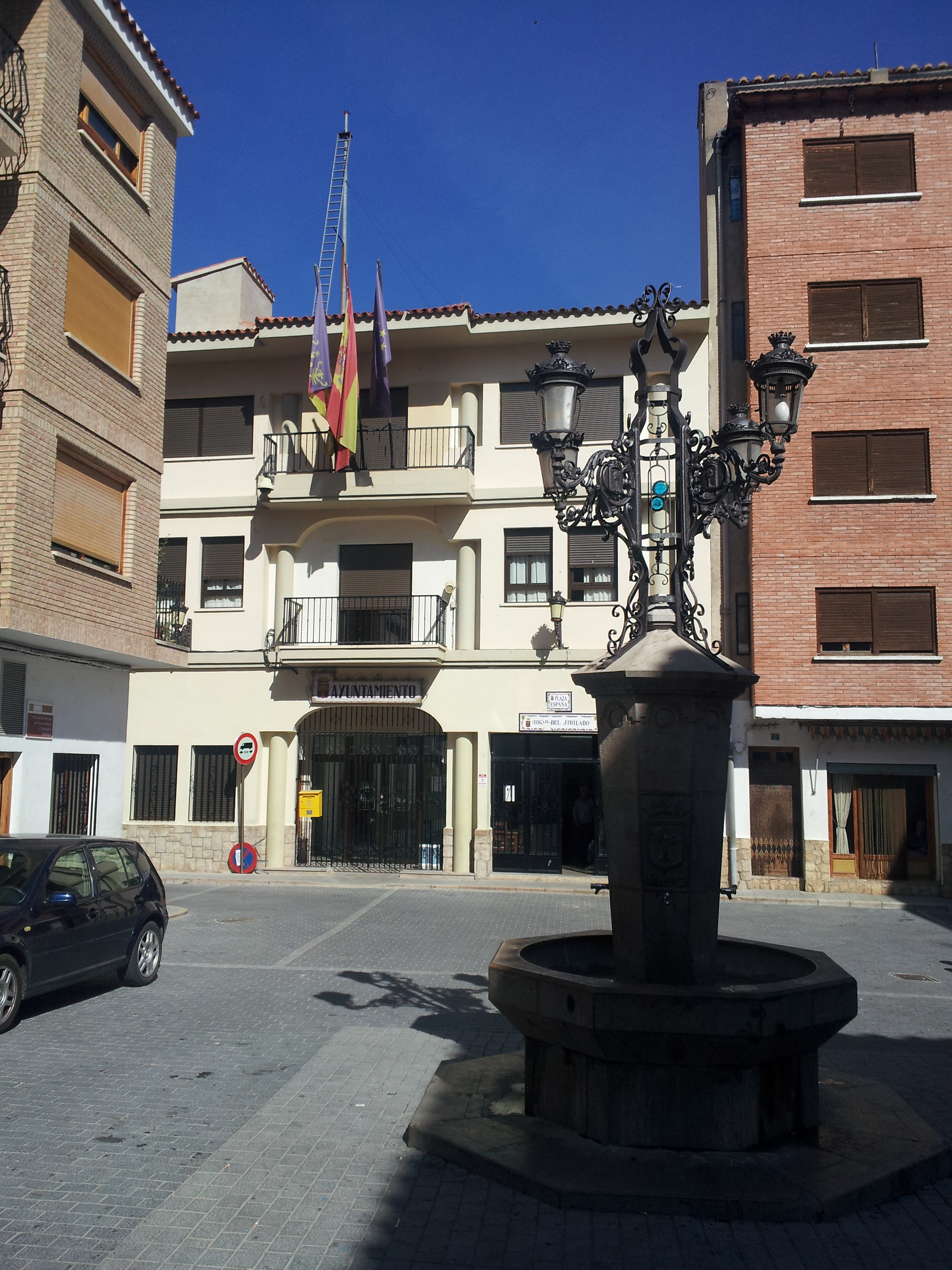
- Town hall

- Coat of arms

- Location within Spain
- Coordinates: 40°04′05″N 00°31′21″W
- Country: Spain
- Autonomous Community: Valencian Community
- Province: Castellón

Area
  - Total: 37.80 km^{2} (14.59 sq mi)

Population (2025-01-01)
  - Total: 649
  - Density: 17.2/km^{2} (44.5/sq mi)
- Time zone: UTC+1 (CET)
  - Summer (DST): UTC+2 (CEST (GMT +2))

Montanejos is a municipality of Spain located in the province of Castellón, Valencian Community. It belongs to the comarca of Alto Mijares. The municipality spans across a total area of 37.80 km^{2} and had a registered population of 564 in January 2020.
