= Segorbe =

- Municipality
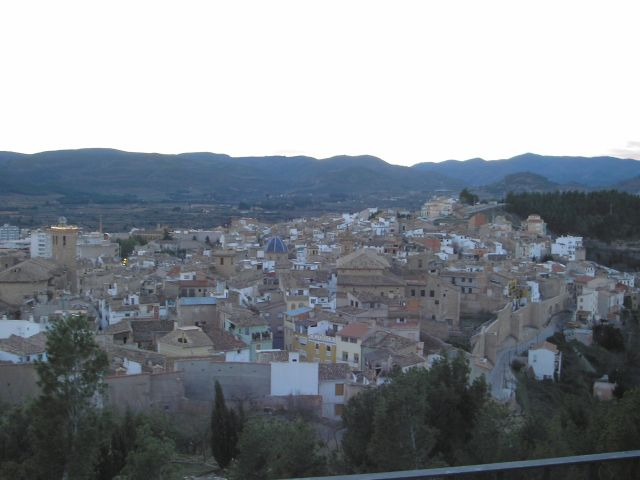
- General view of Segorbe from its castle.

- Flag Coat of arms

- Location of Segorbe in Spain Segorbe (Valencian Community) Segorbe (Spain)
- Coordinates: 39°51′N 0°29′W
- Country: Spain
- Autonomous community: Valencian Community
- Province: Castellón
- Comarca: Alto Palancia
- Judicial district: Segorbe

Government
  - Mayor: Rafael Magdalena Benedito

Area
  - Total: 107.52 km^{2} (41.51 sq mi)
- Elevation: 358 m (1,175 ft)

Population (2025-01-01)
  - Total: 9,805
  - Density: 91.19/km^{2} (236.2/sq mi)
- Demonym: Segorbinos
- Time zone: UTC+1 (CET)
  - Summer (DST): UTC+2 (CEST)
- Postal code: 12400
- Official language(s): Spanish
- Website: Official website

Segorbe is a municipality in the mountainous coastal province of Castelló, autonomous community of Valencia, Spain. The former Palace of the Dukes of Medinaceli now houses the city's mayor. Segorbe's bull-running week (semana de Toros) in September attracts many visitors each year.

== Geography ==
The municipal district area is crossed by the Palancia River from north west to south east. It is located on the natural way from Aragón to Valencian Community, between the Serra d'Espadà on the north and Serra Calderona on the south.

The urban area is located at 358 m height, placed over two hills emerging from the bank of the river.

== History ==
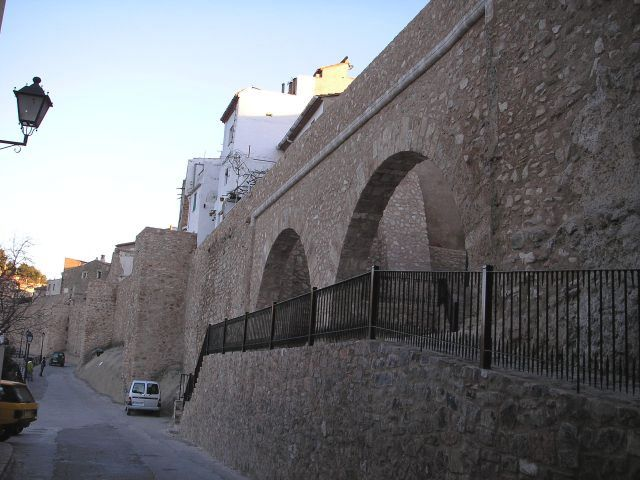
The wall of Segorbe.

The area of Segorbe was inhabited as early as the mid-Palaeolithic Age, as testified by archaeological remains. Segorbe was once identified as the ancient Segobriga, described by Pliny the Elder as the capital of Celtiberia. However, archaeological excavations have uncovered an extensive Roman city in La Mancha which has been identified as Segobriga. During the Visigothic rule in Iberia, it became a diocese seat.

In the 8th century, Segorbe was occupied by Moors from North Africa and its cathedral became a mosque. Segorbe was the residence of Zayd Abu Zayd, the last Almohad governor of Valencia; after his conversion to Christianity, Segorbe became a base for the conquest of Valencia in 1238. In 1435 it became part of the royal estates of the King of Aragon.

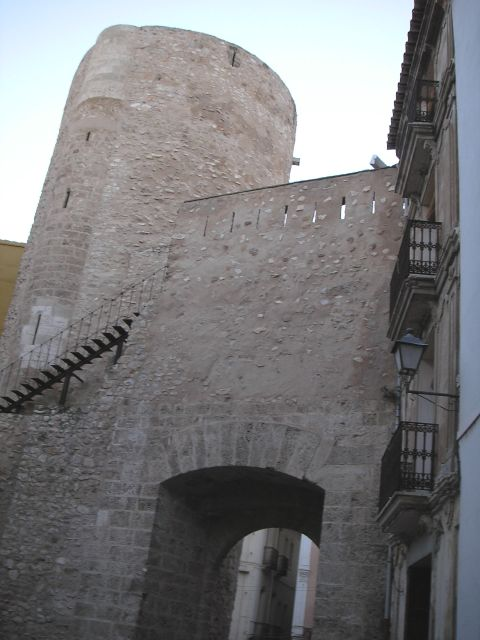
Cárcel Tower and Teruel Gate.

== Main sights ==
The Cathedral of Segorbe, consecrated in 1534 and extended in 1795 is connected by a bridge with the old episcopal palace. Its tower and its cloister are built on a trapezoidal ground-plan.

Segorbe's ancient castle was perhaps located over an Iberian acropolis. It originated as a Moorish alcazar, and lived its period of highest splendor in the later 15th century; Martin of Aragon held his court here. After the administrative center was moved to the new ducal palace in the city, it declined, and, from the mid-18th century, its materials were used for the construction of the hospital and Casa de Misericordia.

Other sights include:

- Church of St. Martin, built in Baroque style in 1612
- Baroque church of San Joaquín y Santa Ana (1695)
- Medieval walls, dating to before the 13th century, including in their last stretch a 14th-century aqueduct. Its features include the Arch of Veronica, the Botxi Tower (with a height of 17.30 m) and the Cárcel Tower (14th century)
- Town Hall, begun in the 16th century.
- Cathedral Museum
- Archaeology and Ethnology Museum

Also had former sights, now demolished, in which include:

- Castle Alcázar of Segorbe

== Duchy of Segorbe ==
The ducal line, in Valencia kingdom, whose members bear the family name of Aragó, was founded by the king Ferdinand I of Aragon who made his eldest son, Enric I, the first lord of Segorbe, duke of Villena, count of Empúries and count of Alburquerque. His son Enric II was created duke of Segorbe and was also count of Empúries, like his son Alfons I. The son of this last one, Francesc I, inherited from his father the duchy of Segorbe and county of Empúries, and from his mother (Joana of Cardona) the duchy of Cardona. He had no sons and the succession passed through his sister Joana, who was married to Diego Fernández de Córdoba, marquis of Comares. His son Lluis Folc de Cardona-Aragó was count of Prades, but he predeceased his mother in 1596 and the heir was the son (grandson of Joana) Enric III d'Aragó Folc de Cardona Córdoba. His son Lluis I succeeded him and deceased in 1670 and his son and successor Joaquin I also deceased in 1670. The heir was Pere Antoni, brother of Lluis I. After his death in 1690, the succession was claimed by Caterina, sister of Joaquin, married with Juan Francisco de la Cerda, duke of Medinaceli. The Medinaceli dukes received the duchy of Segorbe, the duchy of Cardona and the county of Empúries.

Lord:

- Enric I 1436-1445

Dukes:

- Enric II 1455-1522
- Alfons I 1522-1563
- Francesc I 1563-1575
- Joana 1575-1608
- Enric III 1608-1640
- Lluis I 1640-1670
- Joaquin 1670
- Pere Antoni 1670-1690
- Caterina 1690

To dukes of Medinaceli 1690 (later passed to the de Medina y Fernández de Córdoba).

The present holder of the dukedom is don Ignacio de Medina y Fernández de Córdoba, Duke of Segorbe, who is married to Princess Maria da Gloria of Orléans-Braganza.

== See also ==
- Castle Alcázar of Segorbe
- Diocese of Segorbe-Castellón
