= Castle Alcázar of Segorbe =

Building in the Valencian Community of Spain

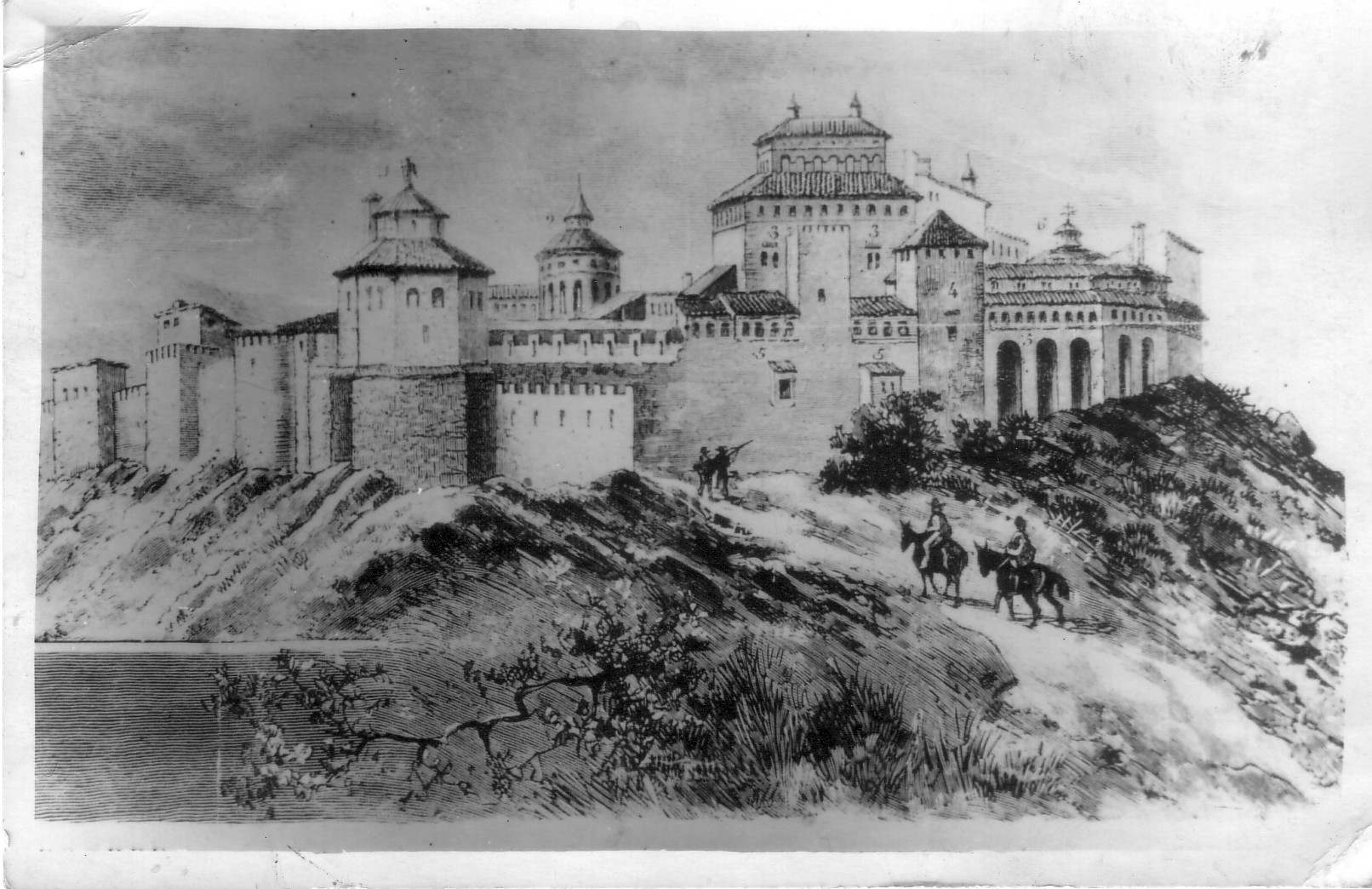
Nineteenth-century engraving of Castle Alcázar

Castle Alcázar of Segorbe was an alcázar (palace or castle) located on the slopes of Sopeña in the town of Segorbe, in the Valencian Community of Spain. Very little remains of the original alcázar, but the large complex was a residence of lords, dukes and kings for over a millennium.

== History ==
Arabs from the Baraní family of the Sinhala Confederacy built the first fortress. After the Muslim king of Valencia, Zayd Abu Zayd, converted to Christianity and declared himself an ally and vassal of King James I of Aragon, he ceded the fortress to James in 1229 and became governor general of Valencia on his behalf. The castle became a sanctuary for Zayd Abu Zayd himself when he was killed by Dynamil Zayyan until James captured the castle in 1245, and placed Abu Zayd in command of an army to assist in the retaking of Valencia.

The castle had a peak in the 14th and 15th centuries, culminating in the holding of General Courts by King Martin of Aragon, who had made the city his residence.

Among the most notable rulers of Segorbe are Doña Maria de Luna, Queen of Aragon, wife to King Martin (through whom the Segorban Alcázar became a royal residence), and the first Duke of Segorbe, Enrique de Aragón y Pimentel, who was responsible for several improvements to the castle. These included building new quarters, decorating the Our Lady of La Leche chapel with rich ornaments (which are currently in the cathedral museum), adding a hot tub and pool, and adding marble columns. Martín de Viciana noted that it was "very beautiful with many pieces and beautiful and good-styled rooms."

In 1784, urban expansion of Segorbe beyond the original medieval fortifications required further construction, and new walls were built. After the works were completed, the new walls had eight gates known as Teruel, Argén, Sopeña, Cárrica, Castellnovo, Valencia, la Maza, and Altura.

== See also ==
- List of missing landmarks in Spain
