= Aragó =

Dynasty of Royal house of Aragon

Coordinates: 43°17′49″N 2°18′55″E

Aragó is a family name that descended from the kings of the Aragonese Crown. The kings never used any family name. All lines are now exhausted. The name originated from the rivers Aragón and Aragón Subordán in northern Spain.

== Lines ==
=== Originated by four sons of James I of Aragon ===
- Mallorca, created by the king James II of Majorca.
- Hixar, created by Peter, lord of Hixar.
- Xerica, created by Peter, lord of Xerica.
- Castre, created by Ferran lord of Castre.

=== Originated by a son of James II of Aragon ===
- Empúries, created by Ramón Berenguer I, count of Empúries
- Prades-Gandia-Villena, created by Peter I, Count of Prades (later dukes)

=== Originated by a son of Alfonso III of Aragon ===
- Urgell, created by James I count of Urgell

=== Originated by a son of Peter II of Aragon ===
- Avola, created by Frederic II king of Sicily, they were lords (later Marquiss) of Avola and Terranova.

=== Originated by a son of Ferran I of Aragon ===
- Segorbe, created by Henry I lord of Segorbe (Later dukes)

=== Originated by a son of Alfonso IV of Aragon ===
- Naples, created by Ferdinand I king of Naples

=== Originated by a son of Ferdinand I of Naples ===
- Montalto, created by Ferdinand, duke of Montalto

=== Originated by a son of John II of Aragon ===
- Vilafermosa, created by Alphonse, duke of Vilafermosa

=== Originated by a son of Ferran II of Aragon ===
- Argavieso-Ballobar, created by Alfonso (archbishop of Zaragoza) and their descendants
