= Duchy of Vilafermosa =

The Duchy of Vilafermosa is a line of dukes in Aragón, originated in 1476 by King John II of Aragón whose members bear the family name of Aragó. The first duke was a bastard of John II called Alfons d'Aragó (Alphonse of Aragó).

Dukes:

- Alphonse I until 1485
- Alphonse II 1485-1513
- John I 1513-1528
- Alphons III 1528-1550
- Martí 1550-1581
- Aldonça, sister of Martí; she originated the family of Azlor, titled Dukes of Vilafermosa
- Ferran I 1581-1592
- María Luisa (duchess), daughter of Ferran I; she originated the families named Borja and Aragó-Gurrea, titled Dukes of Vilafermosa, by union to the descents of the last duchess
- Francesc I 1592-1622
- Joana-Lluisa 1622–1652, daughter of Francesc I, she originated the families Borja and Aragó-Gurrea.
