= Alcázar =

Type of Islamic castle or palace in Spain

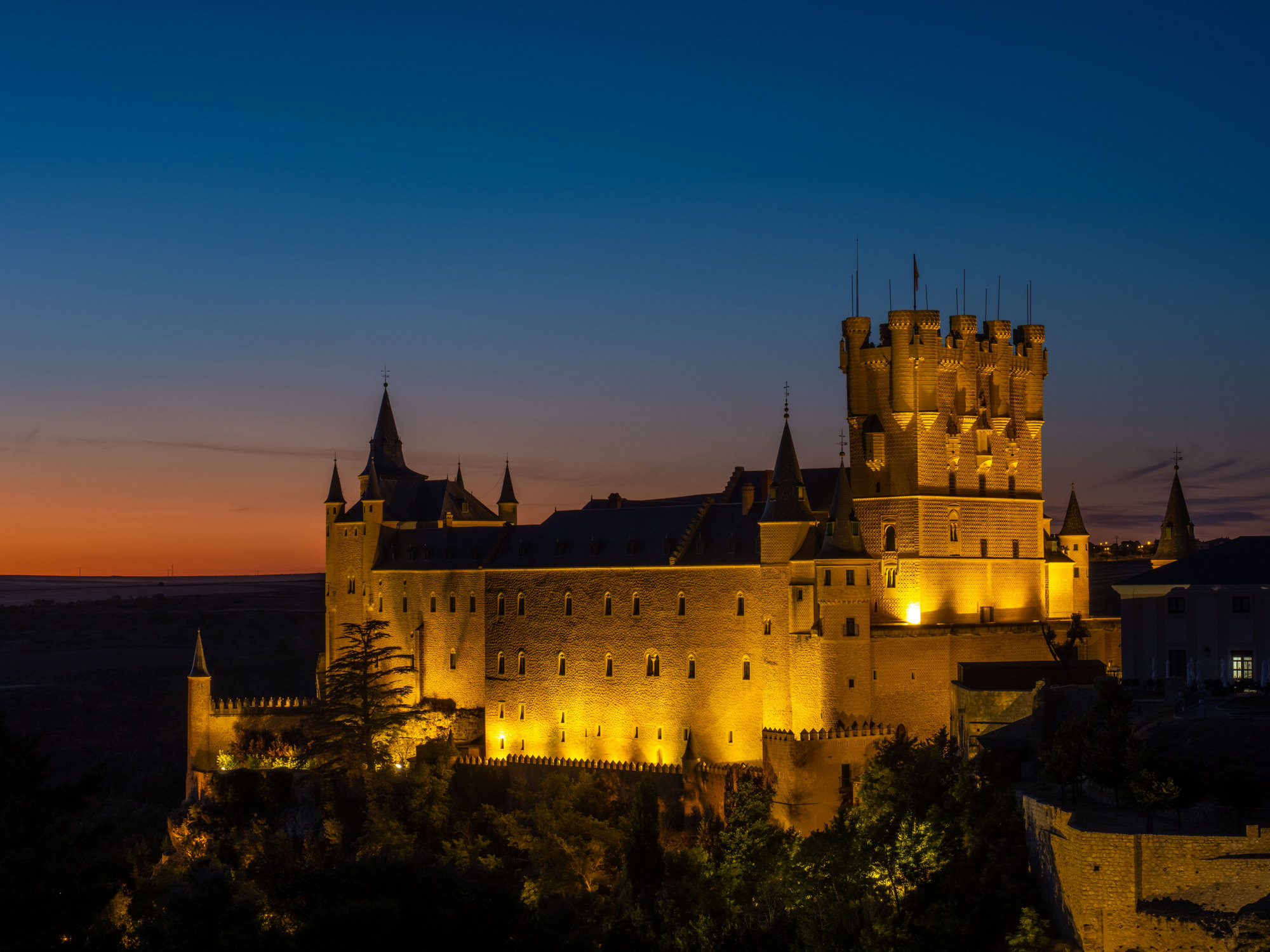
The Alcázar of Segovia, which dates back to the early 12th century, is one of the most famous medieval castles in the world and one of the most visited monuments in Spain

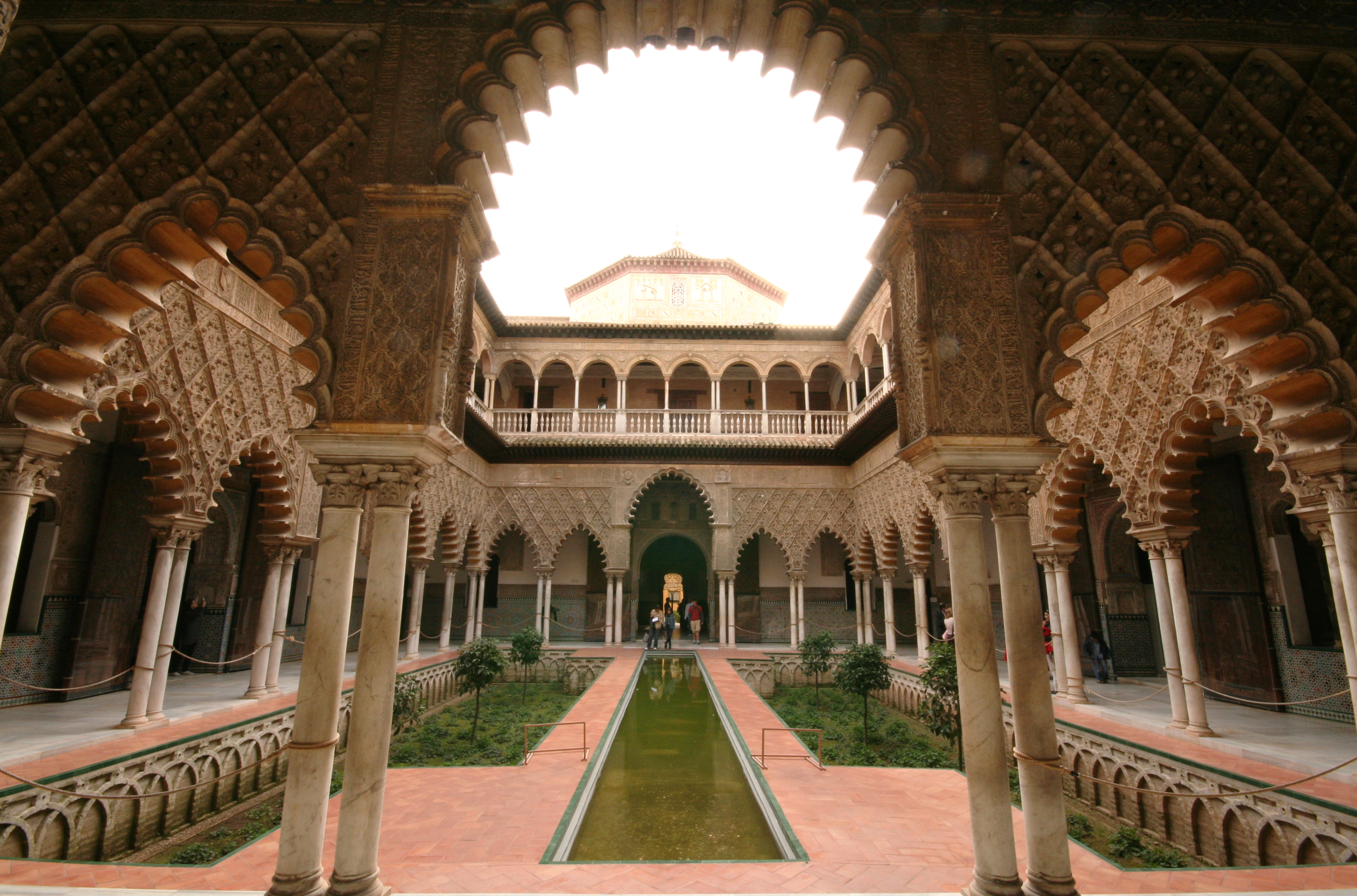
A view of the Patio de las doncellas, a ṣaḥn within the Alcázar of Seville

An alcázar (from Arabic: القصر, romanized: al-qaṣr, lit. 'the fort'; see below) is a type of Islamic castle or palace in Spain built during Muslim rule between the 8th and 15th centuries. They functioned as homes and regional capitals for governmental figures throughout the Umayyad caliphate and later for Christian rulers following the Iberian Reconquista. The term alcázar is also used for many medieval castles built by Christians on earlier Roman, Visigothic or Islamic fortifications and is frequently used as a synonym for castillo or castle. In Latin America there are also several colonial palaces called alcázars.

== Terminology ==
The Spanish word alcázar (pronounced [alˈkaθaɾ]) derives from the Arabic word القصر al-qaṣr 'the fort/castle/palace', that in turn derives from the Latin word castrum ('fortress', 'military camp').

Similar words exist in Galician (alcázar, pronounced [alˈkaθɐɾ]), Portuguese (alcácer, pronounced [alˈkasɛɾ]), and Catalan (alcàsser, pronounced [əlˈkasəɾ]).

Spain also has Muslim citadels known as alcazabas (القصبة al-qaṣbah). However, not all castles in Spain are called alcázars: the majority are called castillo in Spanish or castell in Catalan. Nor was every alcázar or alcazaba in Iberia built by the Muslims: many castles with these names were built after the Islamic caliphate was expelled from the Iberian Peninsula. Following the Spanish Reconquista, Christian patrons built or refurbished palaces to resemble the Islamic style, known as Mudéjar.

Often alcázars are described as "Moorish", derived from the Moors, a term used by Europeans to refer to the Muslim populations of the Iberian Peninsula and the Maghreb during the Middle Ages.

== History ==
Alcázars were owned by Islamic, and later, Christian rulers of al-Andalus, the buildings symbolized the ruler's power and wealth over the region. Over time, the different cultural influences of the buildings merged, marking the alcázar as a transmission among Islamic, Christian and Jewish cultures.

=== Origin ===
Alcázars first became constructed under the Umayyad dynasty. It was after conquering the Visigothic Kingdom when the Umayyads began expanding on their architecture to create a sophisticated Islamic empire. After the 717 conquest, Umayyad caliphs established their capital in Córdoba, Spain, transforming the former Visigoth palace into the Alcázar of the Caliphs.

=== Umayyad dynasty (711–1010) ===
The reign of the Umayyad dynasty in Arabia ended with the rise of the Abbasid caliphate in the second half of the eighth century. Umayyad caliph Abd al-Rahman I fled the Middle East, traveling west for five years before finally settling in what would become known as al-Andalus after the Islamic conquest of Iberia in 711. He and his descendants built palaces equivalent to grand cities that became homes to rulers and Andalusian elites.

- Madinat al-Zahra was designed by Umayyad caliph Abd al-Rahman III and constructed with supervision from his son, Al-Hakam II. It was the first Umayyad palace-city located in Spain following the dynasty's flee from the Abbasids in Iraq. Founded in 936 CE, the palace-city rivaled its counterparts in Baghdad.

=== Reconquista (897–1492) ===
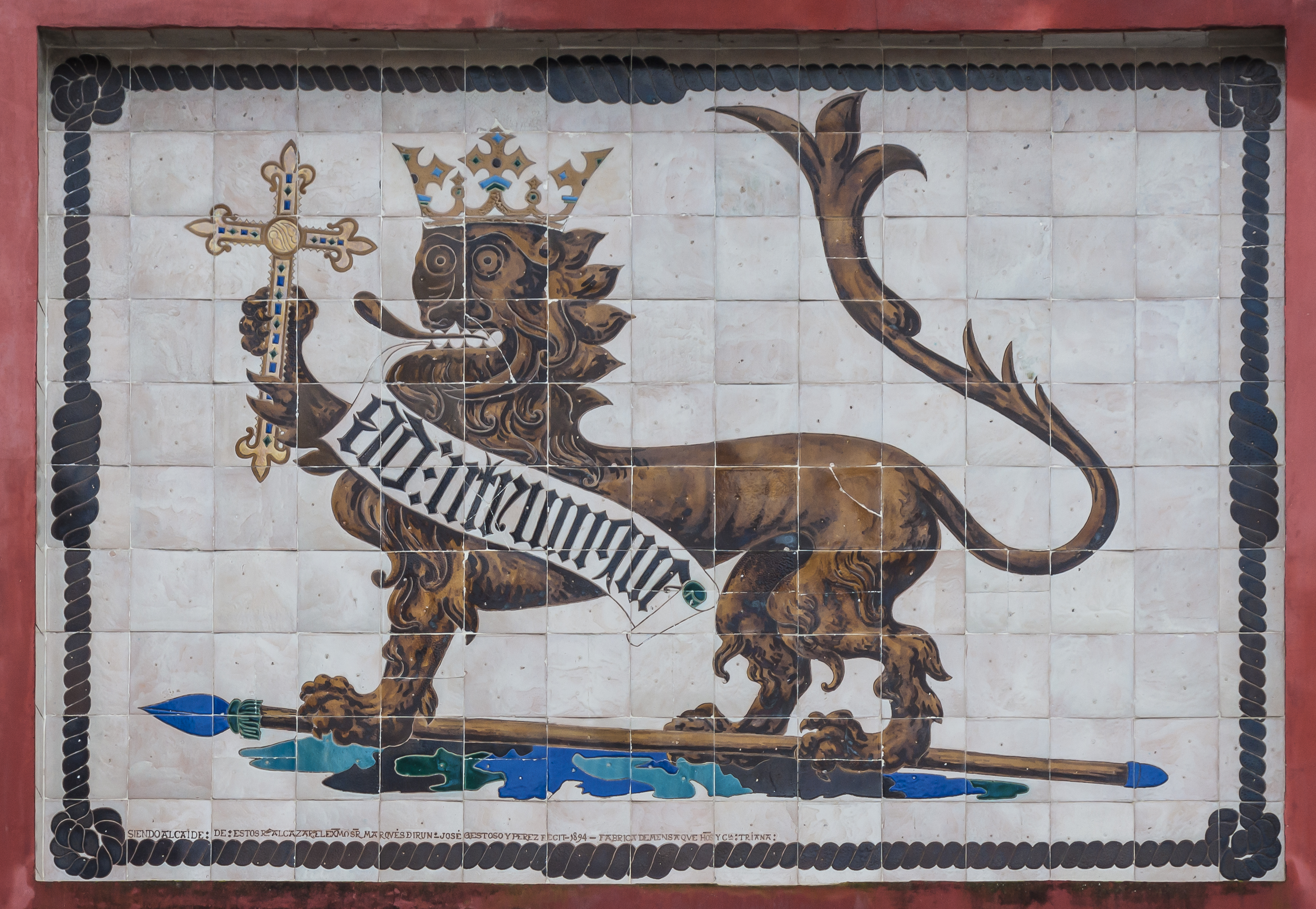
European and Christian iconography on azulejo at the Alcázar of Seville

Not long after the Islamic Empire reached the Pyrenees Mountains in the 8th century, Christian forces began their reconquest of Spain. Starting with the capture of Barcelona in 801 and ending with Granada in 1492, Christian rulers began the 700-year long transition from an Islamic to a Christian Spain. Many of the Islamic-styled architecture constructed by Arabic rulers became denatured under Christian rule.

- After the capture of Córdoba in 1236, Ferdinand III expanded on his campaign of devastation, reaching Seville a few years later. The siege of Seville lasted sixteen months and ended when Christian forces isolated the Muslims by land and sea, forcing them to surrender. Islamic Seville capitulated on November 23, 1248, with Castilian troops occupying the Alcázar of Seville immediately.
- The Christian king of Castile and León, King Pedro I, began commissioning Mudéjar craftsmen to build upon the alcázars all over Andalusia. The most notable additions can be seen in the Alcázar of Seville, where the decorative Islamic style was continued, featuring Arabic inscriptions in praise of King "Sultan" Don Pedro and Allah.

=== Nasrid dynasty (1184–1492) ===
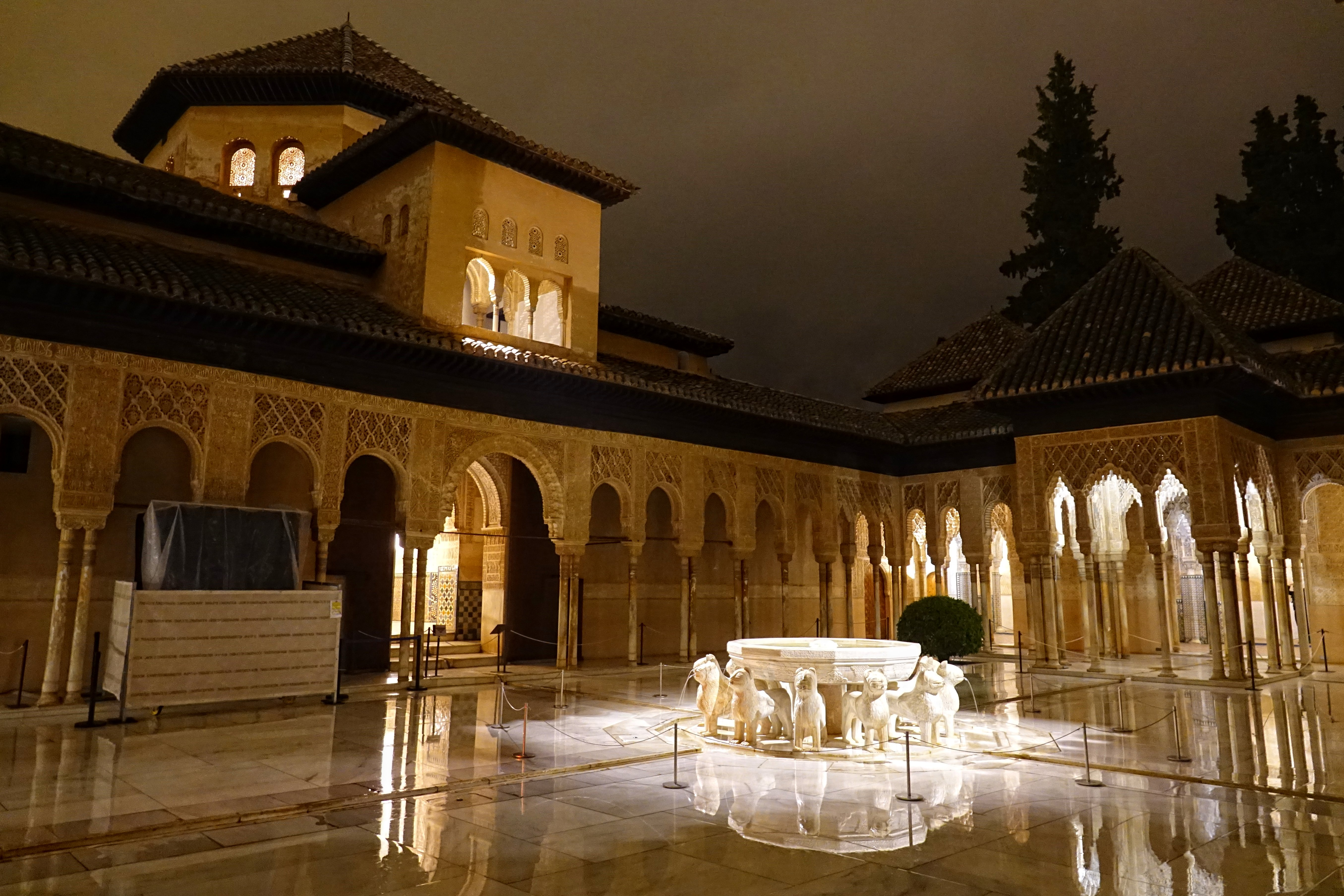
Court of the Lions in the heart of the Alhambra, at night

The Nasrids were the last ruling Islamic dynasty in Iberia before falling to the Reconquista in 1492. They are known for maintaining a Muslim stronghold in southern Spain for many years despite the impending Spanish monarchy to the north. Arguably their greatest architectural accomplishment is the Alhambra located in Granada.

- The Alhambra, translated to 'the red one' in English, is a large fortified palace-city built by the Nasrid dynasty to function as a royal residence. It is well known for its use of Islamic aesthetics in the architecture, along with religious inscriptions. The Alhambra contains several palaces and gardens from which Nasrid sultans conducted business and went about their daily lives.

=== Post Reconquista (1492–present day) ===
While a majority of the Muslim population was forced out of Spain following the Reconquista, some Mudéjars remained, continuing to build hybrid monuments for Christian patrons throughout the 16th century.

- In the years following the Christian reconquest of Spain, the Alhambra underwent many changes in European styles and endured some neglect. Since 1828, there has been a consistent effort to restore and conserve Islamic structures like the Alhambra in Spain.

== Common features ==
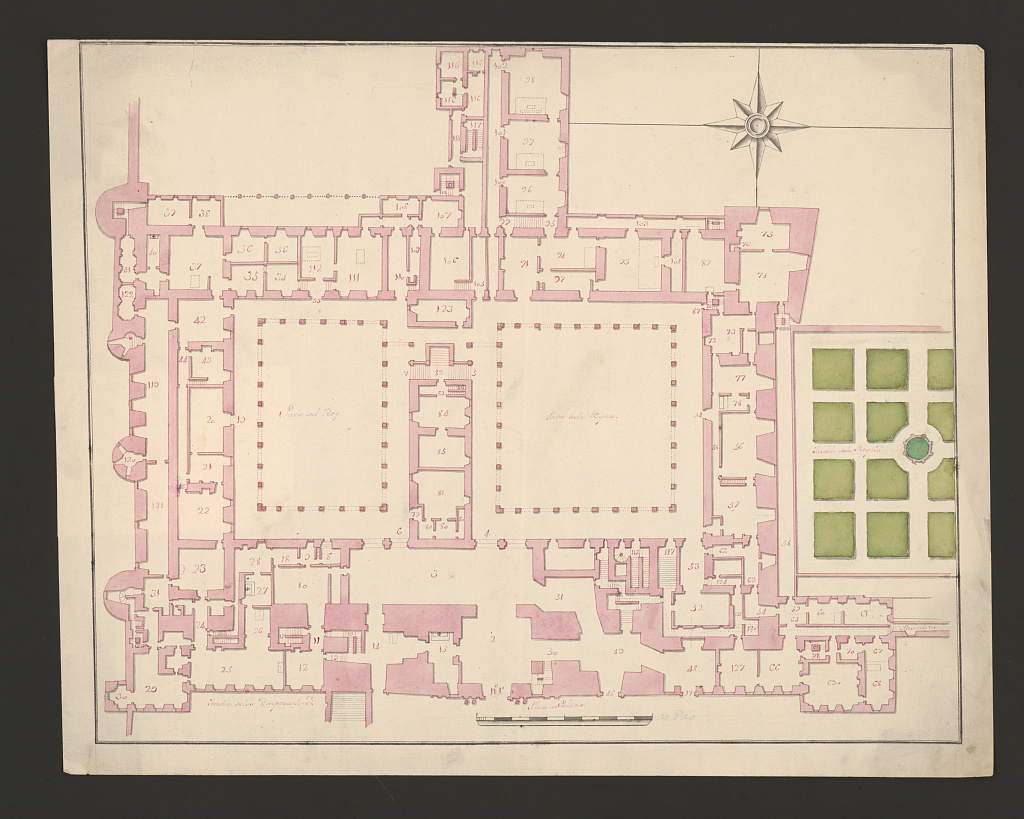
Ground floor plan of the Royal Alcázar of Madrid

The construction that defines alcázars is the distinctive Iberian practices that can be found in the architectural design. This technique is coined as being Mudéjar in style due to the presence of Morisco and Mudéjar craftsmen throughout both Muslim and Christian rule that had largely contributed to, and had a lasting influence on, the construction of buildings. Features of the alcázars reflected Islamic influence with their geometric design and the inward-looking style emphasizing seclusion and privacy for the occupant. Alcázars of the Iberian Peninsula usually consisted of a complex system of buildings with multiple palaces, halls, and courtyards, all serving a specific function.

=== Gardens ===
Gardens played a vital role in the settlement of Islamic Spain, providing a space of relaxation, economic benefits, and the illusion of paradise to its beholder. Alcázar courtyards housed some of the most grandiose gardens in the region, reflecting the wealth of its ruler. The influence of the gardens can be seen today as some gardens still remain, having been preserved and admired by the Christian rulers post-Muslim rule.

Inner courtyard gardens was the most common approach of horticulture in the alcázars. Gardens would be placed into a system of interconnected courtyards where the buildings completely enclosed the space. The gardens were kept from outside view, following Islamic architectural practices of an inward, plain interior that disguised decorated, private areas; only those fortunate enough could witness the courtyards.

Basic components of the alcázar gardens included: a raised grid formation, an irrigation system with a collecting pool as its distribution point, and formal walkways and pavement. Continued influence of Islamic techniques can be seen in the composition of the gardens that are geometric, symmetrical, and often quadripartite arrangement, known as charbaghs. A range of shrubs, trees, vegetables and flowers were grown in these gardens. The fruits could be cultivated and marketable while also supplying the garden with a pleasant fragrance and aesthetic beauty. The fruit trees in the gardens of the Alcázar of Seville are reported to have introduced new, "exotic" fruits to Europe such as lemons, oranges, apricots, and peaches.

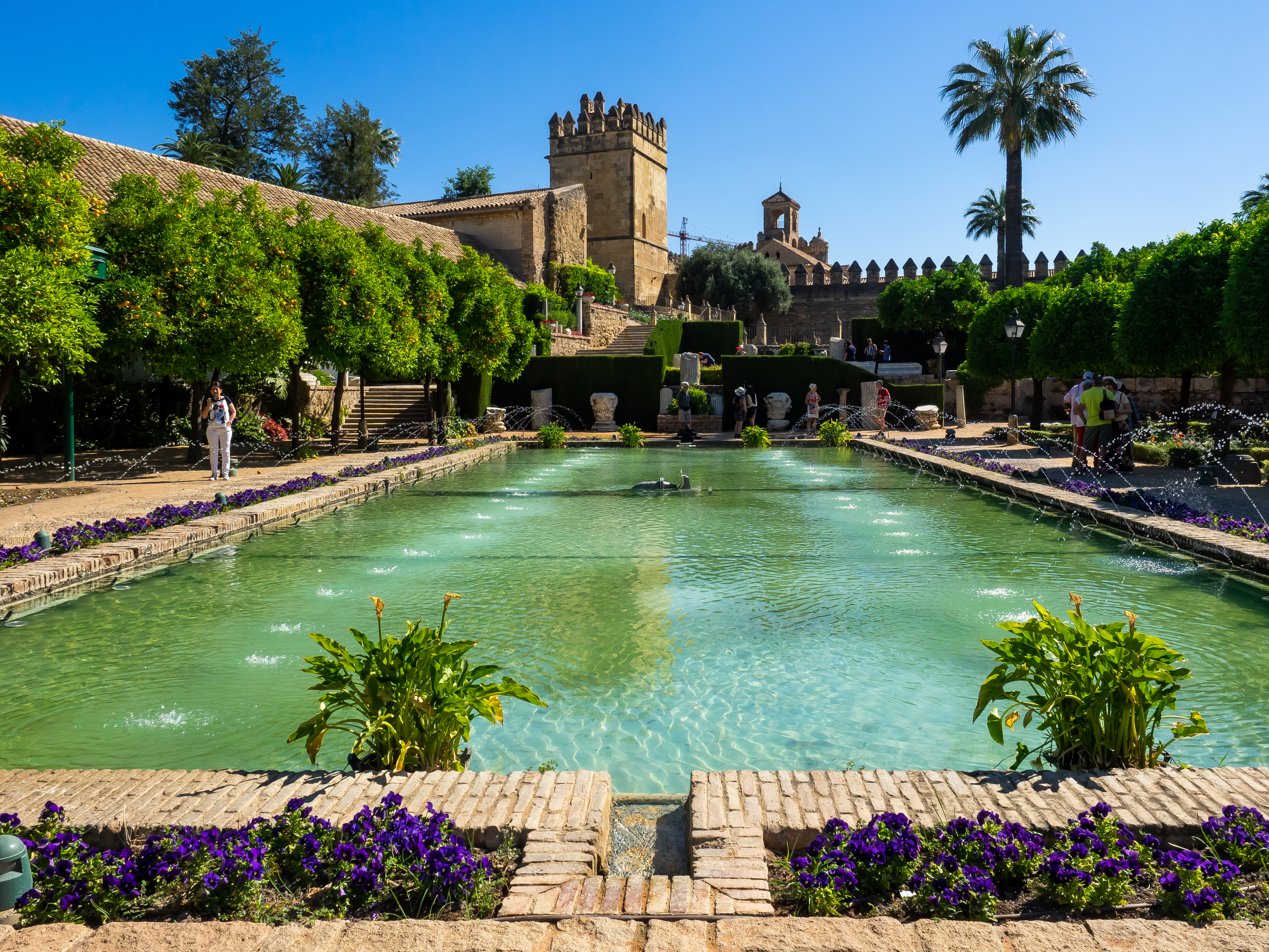
In the gardens of the Alcázar de los Reyes Cristianos in Córdoba, Andalusia

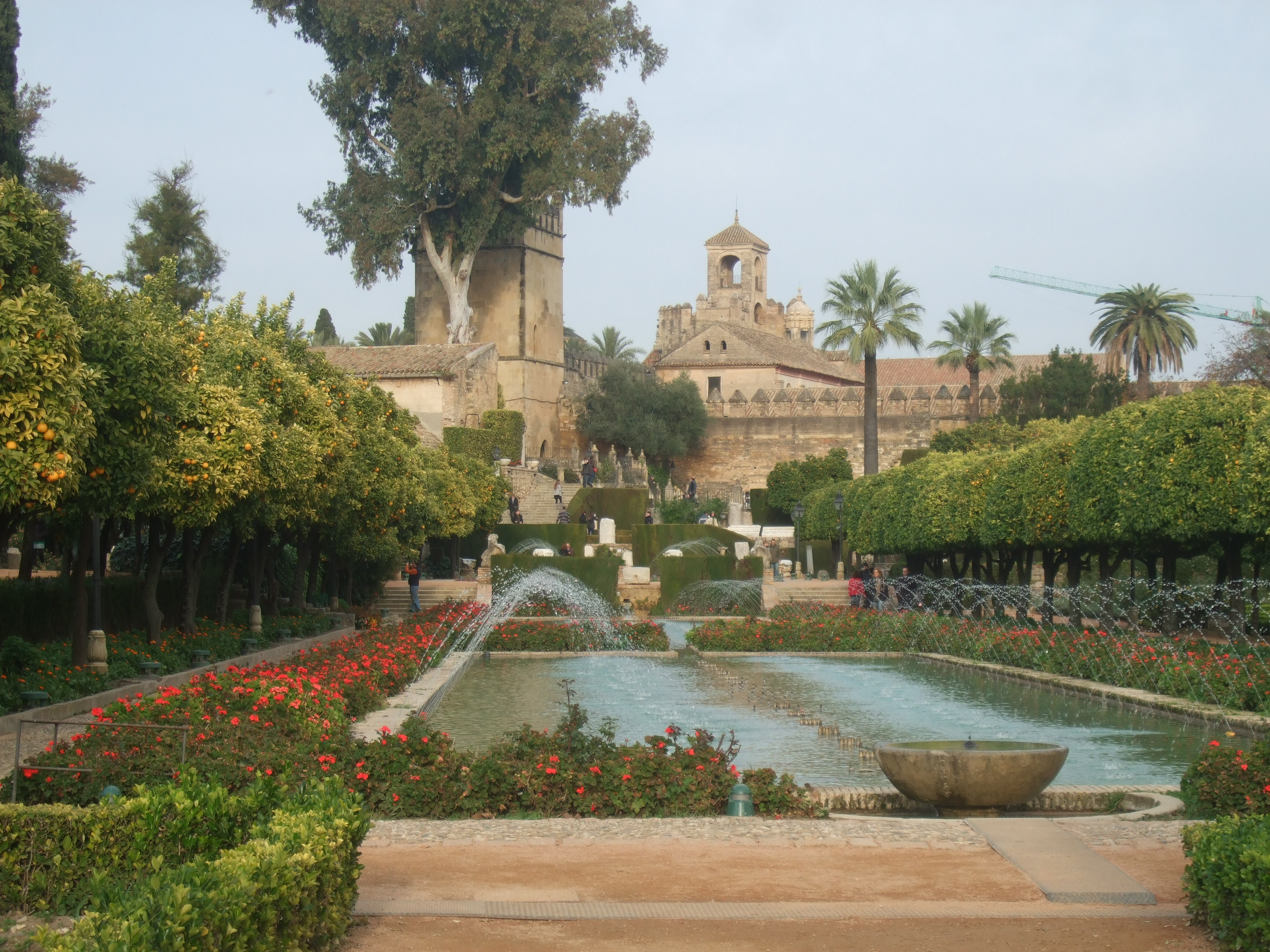
Garden of the King's Alcazar in Córdoba

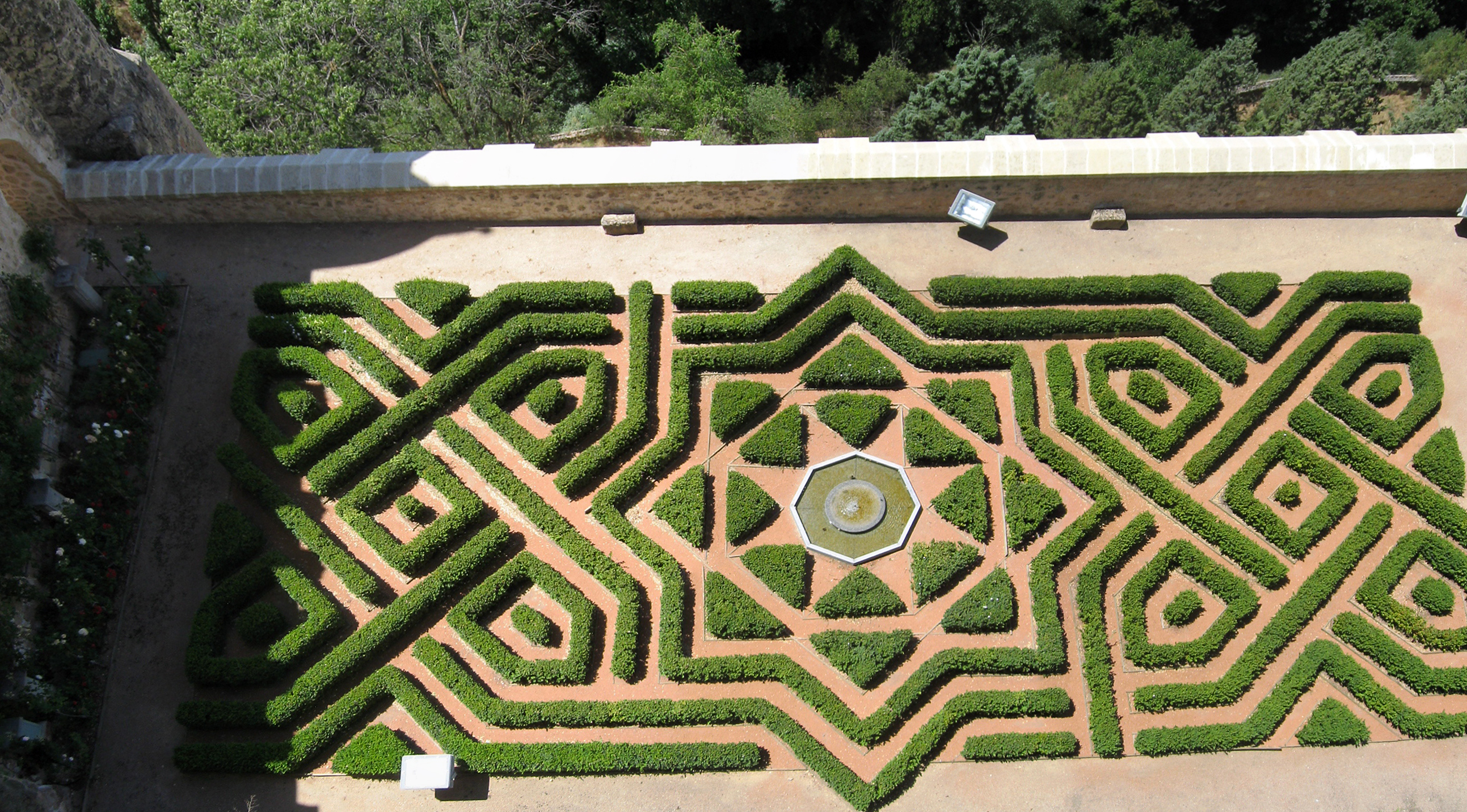
Garden from the Alcázar of Segovia

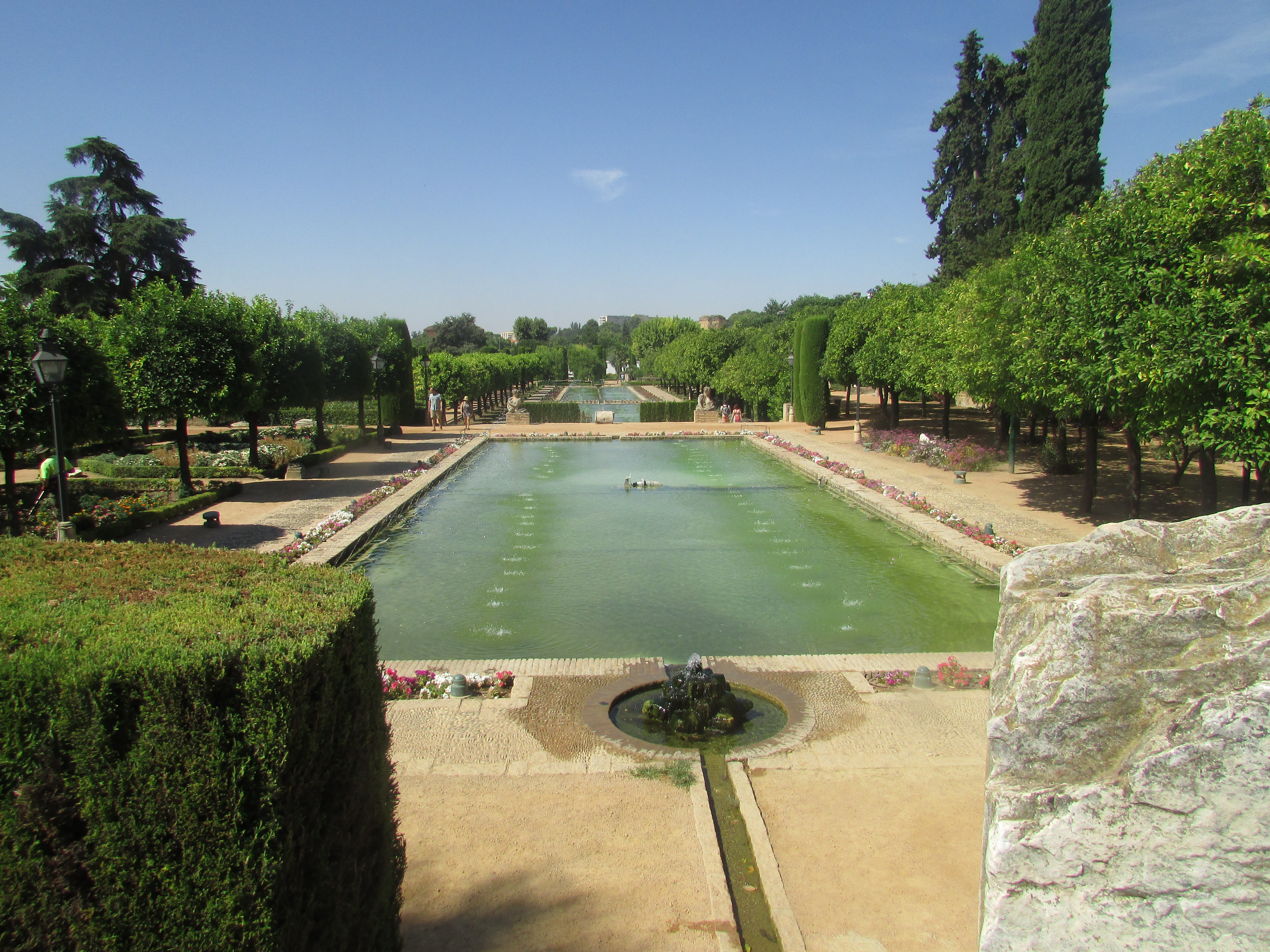
Water system (lower pools and irrigation channel) of the King's Alcazar

==== Water system ====
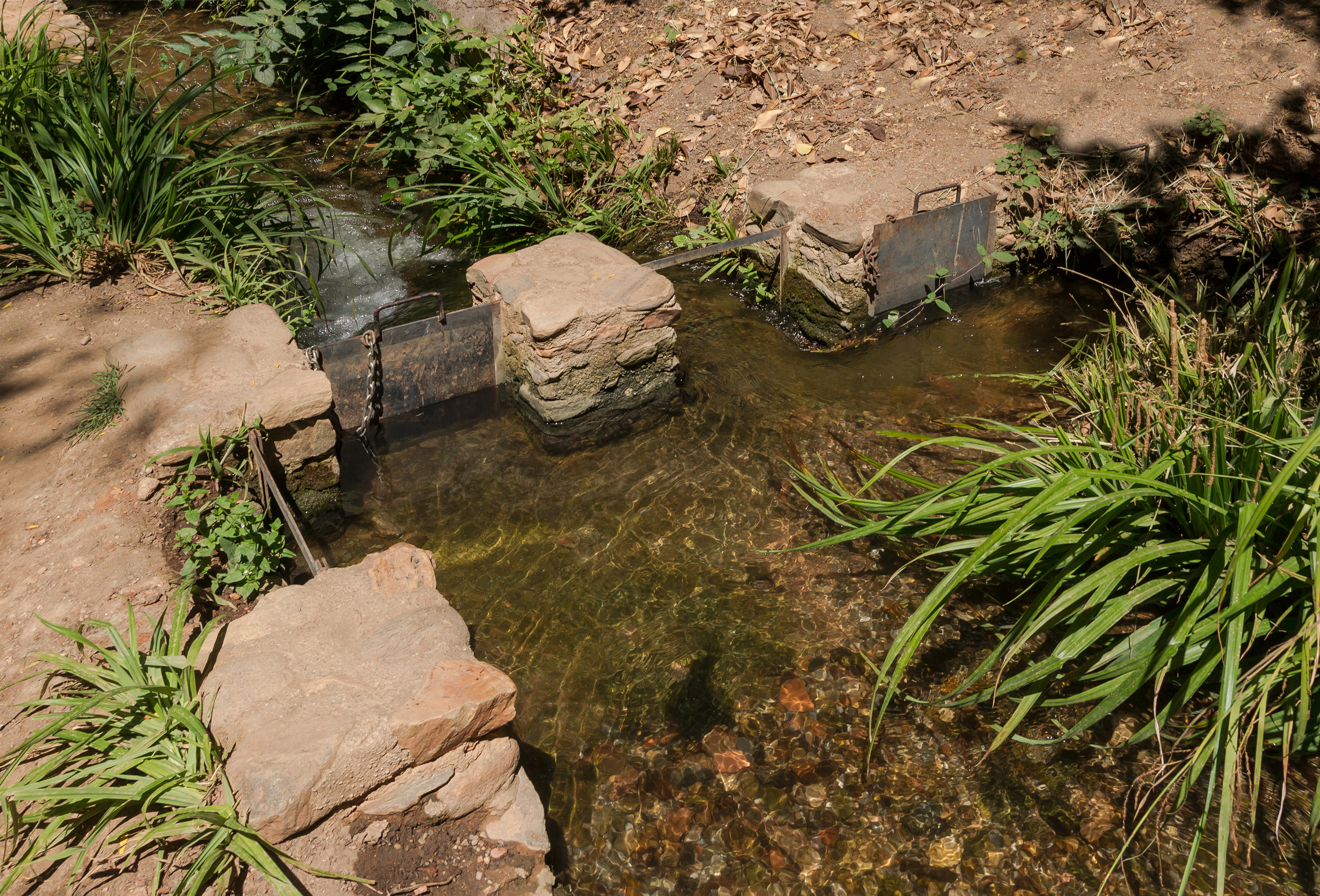
The irrigation system of the Alhambra; source of spring water used on the gardens

Constant irrigation was necessary to maintain the lush flora of the gardens. Intricate Arabic irrigation designs were incorporated into the courtyards of the alcázars by Muslim rulers to serve multiple purposes. The systems supplied the gardens with a constant flow of fresh water, aesthetically refreshed the space, and had a cooling effect on the courtyard and surrounding buildings. Each irrigation system of the alcázars had unique elements, defining the individuality of the location. These techniques ranged from still pools, flowing channels, and fountains, and were implemented to achieve a visual and architectural link from exterior to interior spaces. Water created a sense of peace and spiritual stability in the gardens.

- The Comares Palace of the Alhambra uses a large pool in the center of the courtyard as both a functioning irrigation system and an artistic spectacle. Shrubbery flanked the sides of the pool and therefore had access to water and the pool reflects the two porticoed sides of the surrounding buildings, providing an interesting illusion to the viewer.
- The courtyards in the Alcázar of Seville feature an irrigation tank with flower beds on each side, along with aqueducts dividing deeply sunken flower beds. The flower beds are arranged in a geometric pattern with channels providing water from a central basin.

=== Inscriptions ===
Since the Umayyad dynasty, displays of monumental inscriptions with religious or civic purpose are commonly seen on the entrances and façades of Iberian architecture. In both Muslim-built and Christian Mudéjar palaces in Spain, inscriptions are prevalent in the palace design. One instance is the Alhambra in Granada where Arabic inscriptions are present throughout the palace walls. Some of these inscriptions include excerpts from the Quran, poetry written by Ibn al-Khatib and Ibn Zamrak, and the Nasrid dynasty's motto. A recurring saying throughout is also present, ولا غالب إلا الله or "there is no victor but God."

At the Alcázar of Seville, a mix of Arabic and Spanish inscriptions uplift the bilingual atmosphere of Mudéjar style Spanish architecture. The palaces's patron, Peter of Castile, was a Christian that embraced the Muslims' taste for beauty in the form of the Islamic decoration, including inscriptions in Arabic, alcázar.

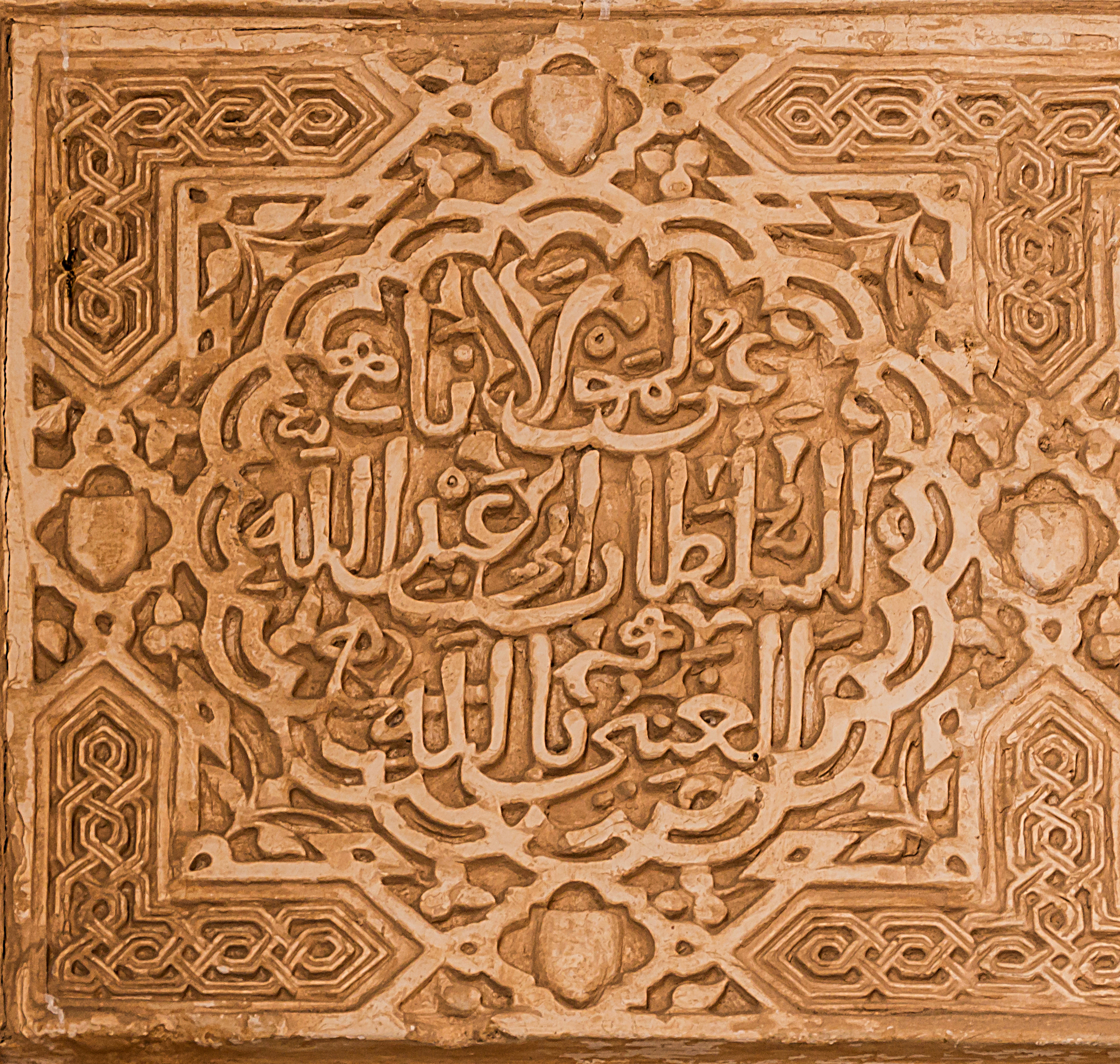
Nasrid motto decoratively inscribed in the wall of the Alhambra

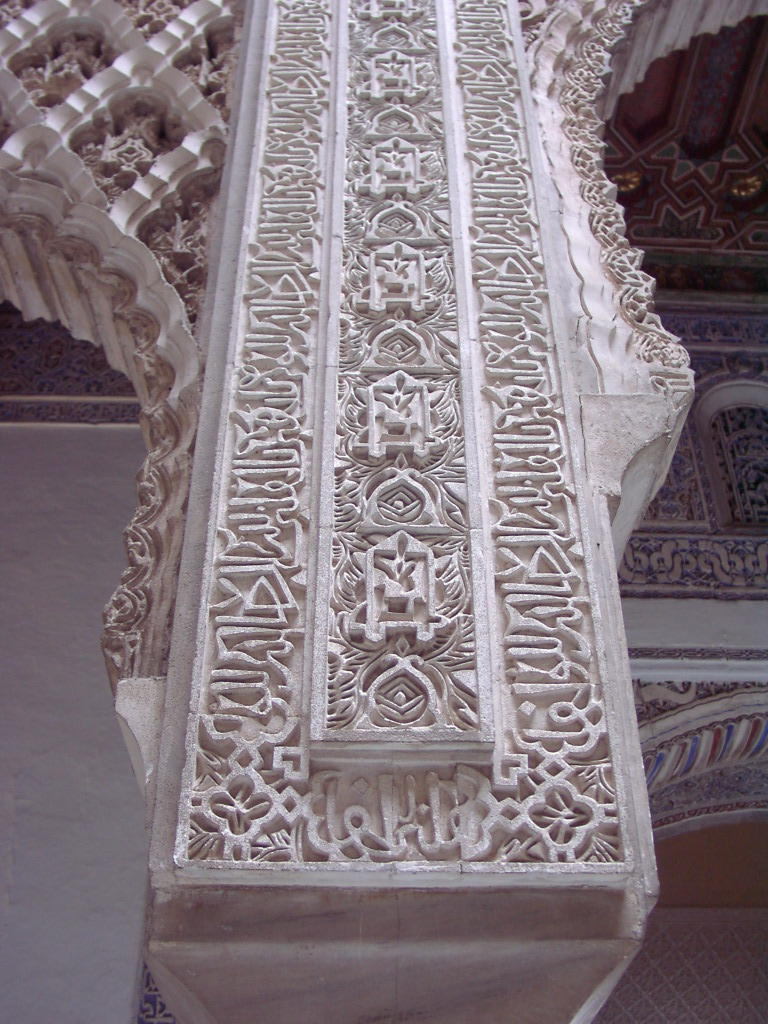
Decorative Arabic inscriptions from the Alcázar of Seville

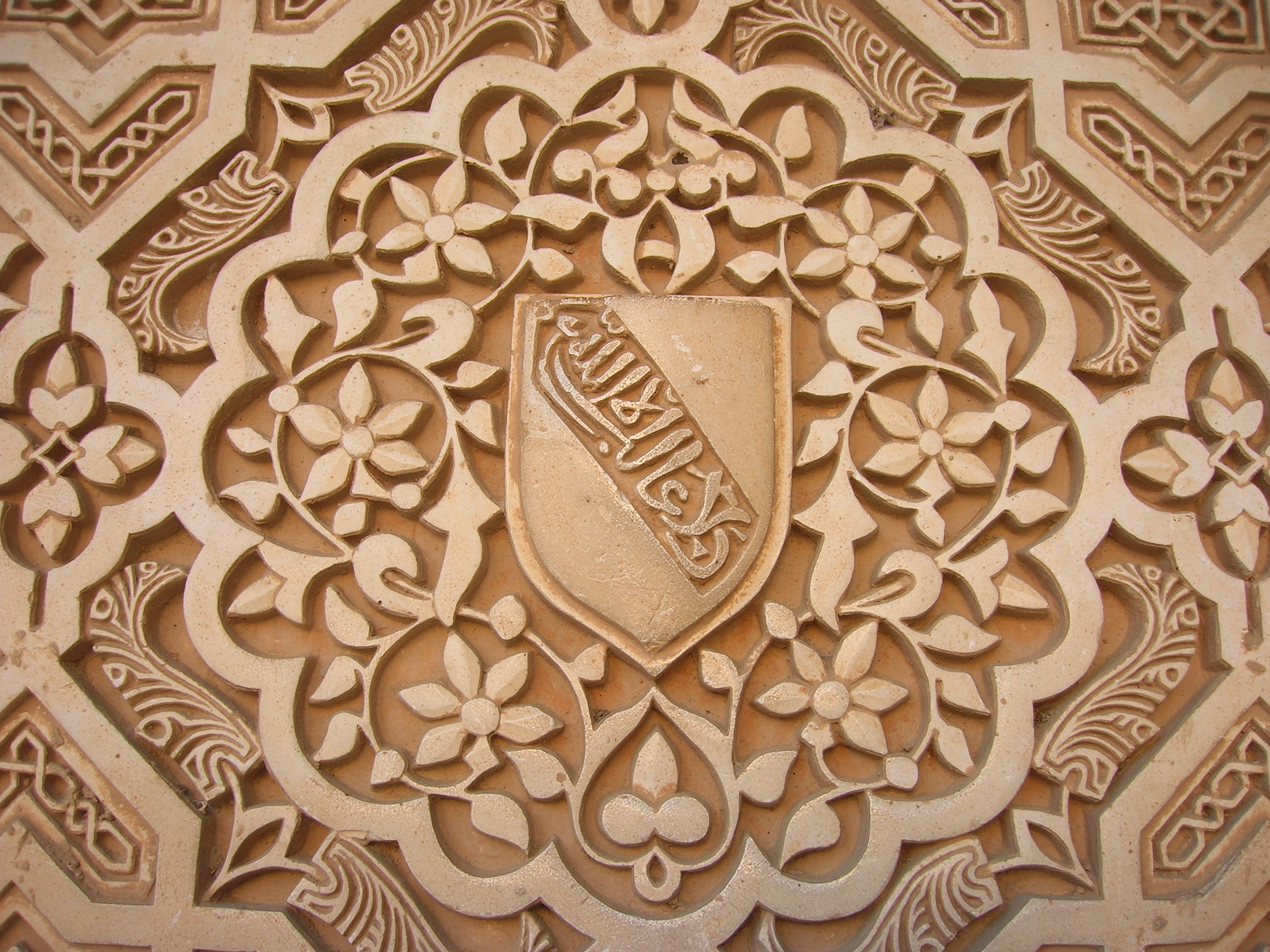
Hybrid inscription on the Alhambra walls; the Arabic Nasrid motto inscribed on the traditionally European coat of arms

=== Triumphal arch ===
Arches—either single or triple, in the form of Roman triumphal arches—in the alcázars of al-Andalus were used to provide formal and symbolic character to the buildings. They are rich in Islamic-inspired decoration and are located strategically; commonly opening up to the main squares or courtyards.

- The Alhambra emulates a triumphal arch between the Puerta del Vino (wine gate) and the Puerta de la Justicia (justice gate). It is decorated with various colors and ornamentation that includes a stucco of the coat of arms from the Band of the Sultan Muhammad V of Granada (1354–1359 and 1362–1391) The arches in the Alhambra serve multiple purposes, one opening into the grant courtyards of the building, and the other providing a view outside to Granada—where the rulers could contemplate the land they controlled.
- The Alcázar of Seville features a triumphal arch at the entrance to the Patio de la Montería, opening up to the palace's monumental façade. The triple archway is decorated in heraldic designs, including the badge of Knights of the Band.
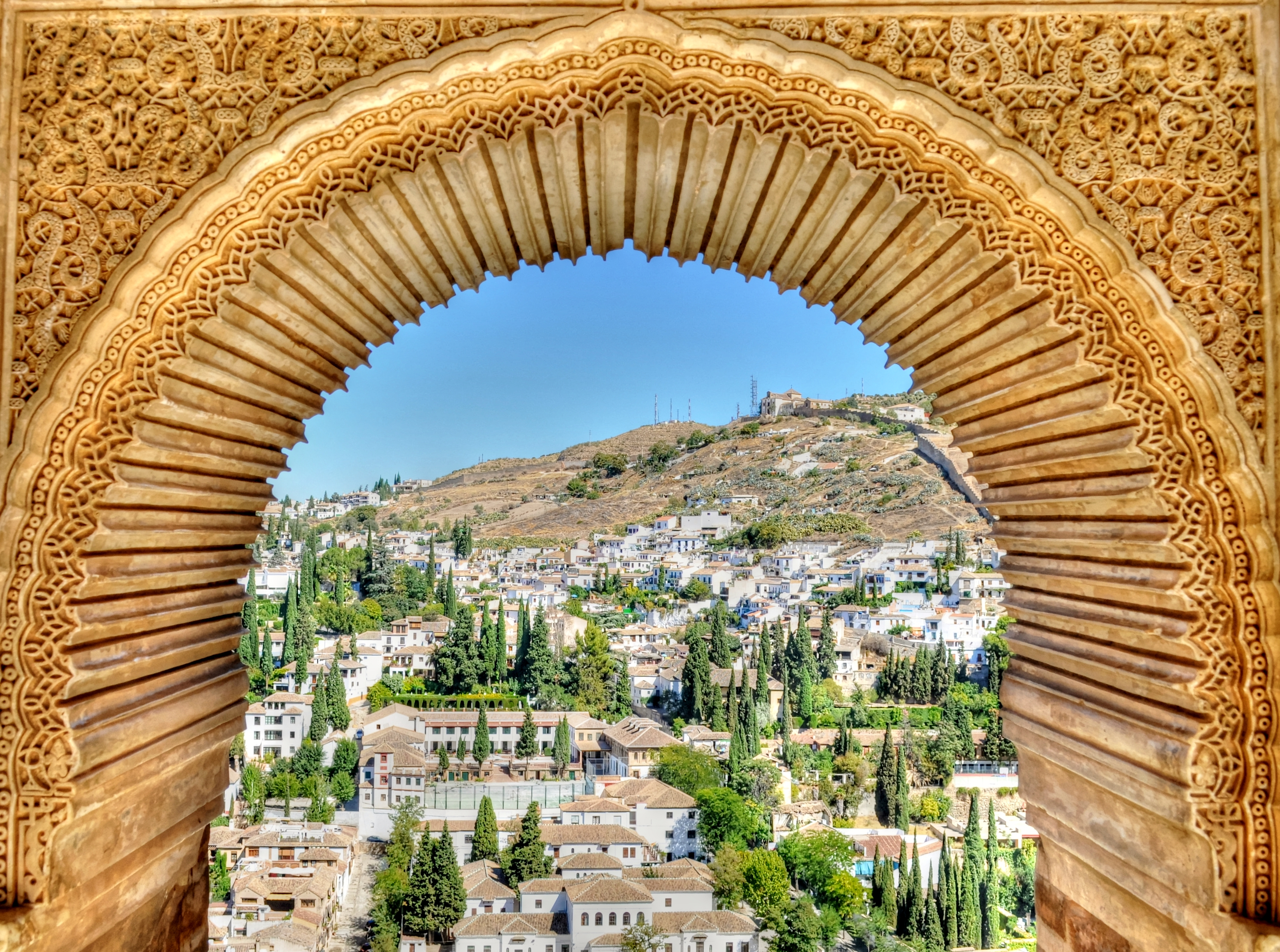
Arched viewpoint from the Alhambra

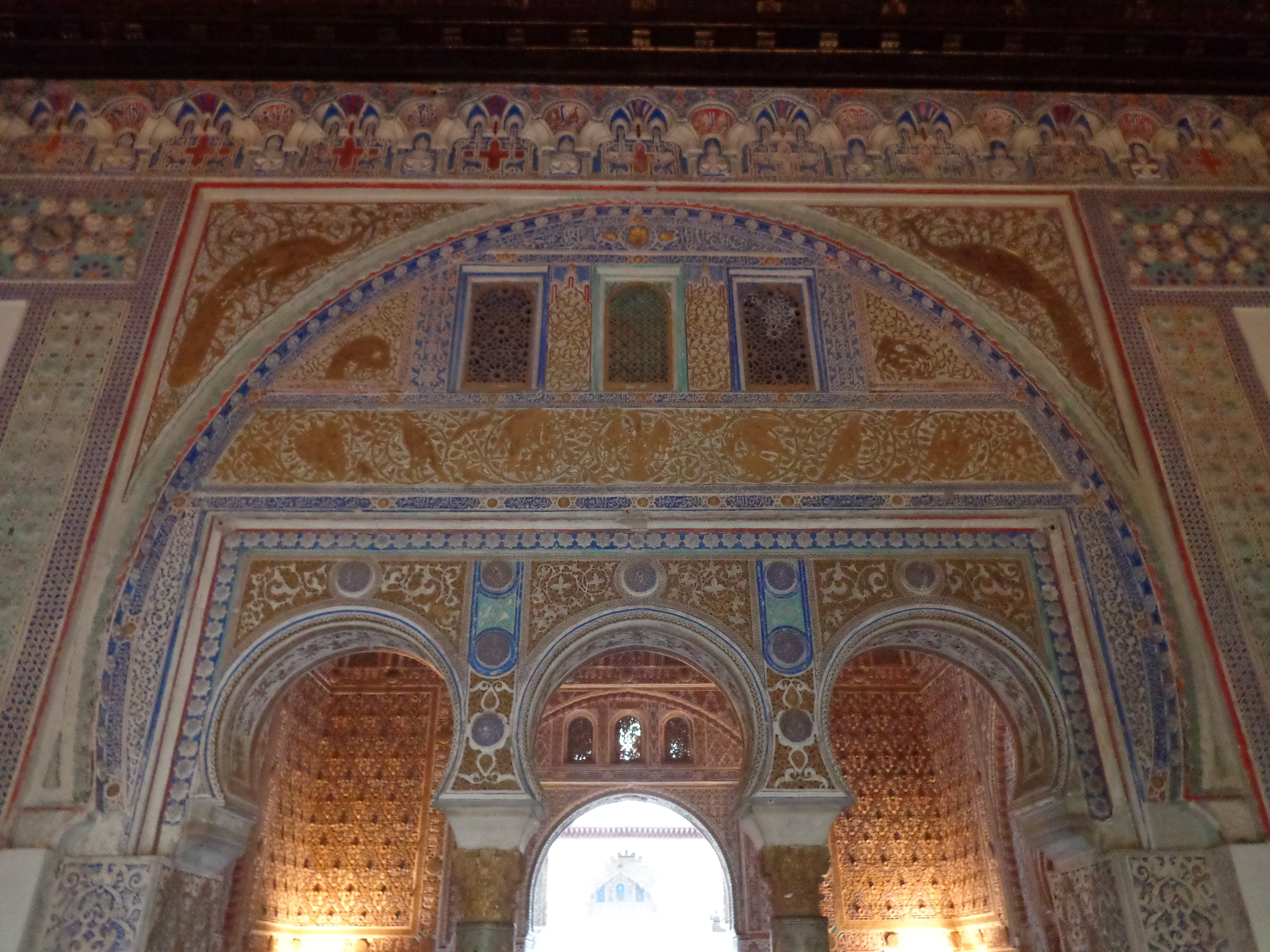
Three archways of the Alcázar of Seville

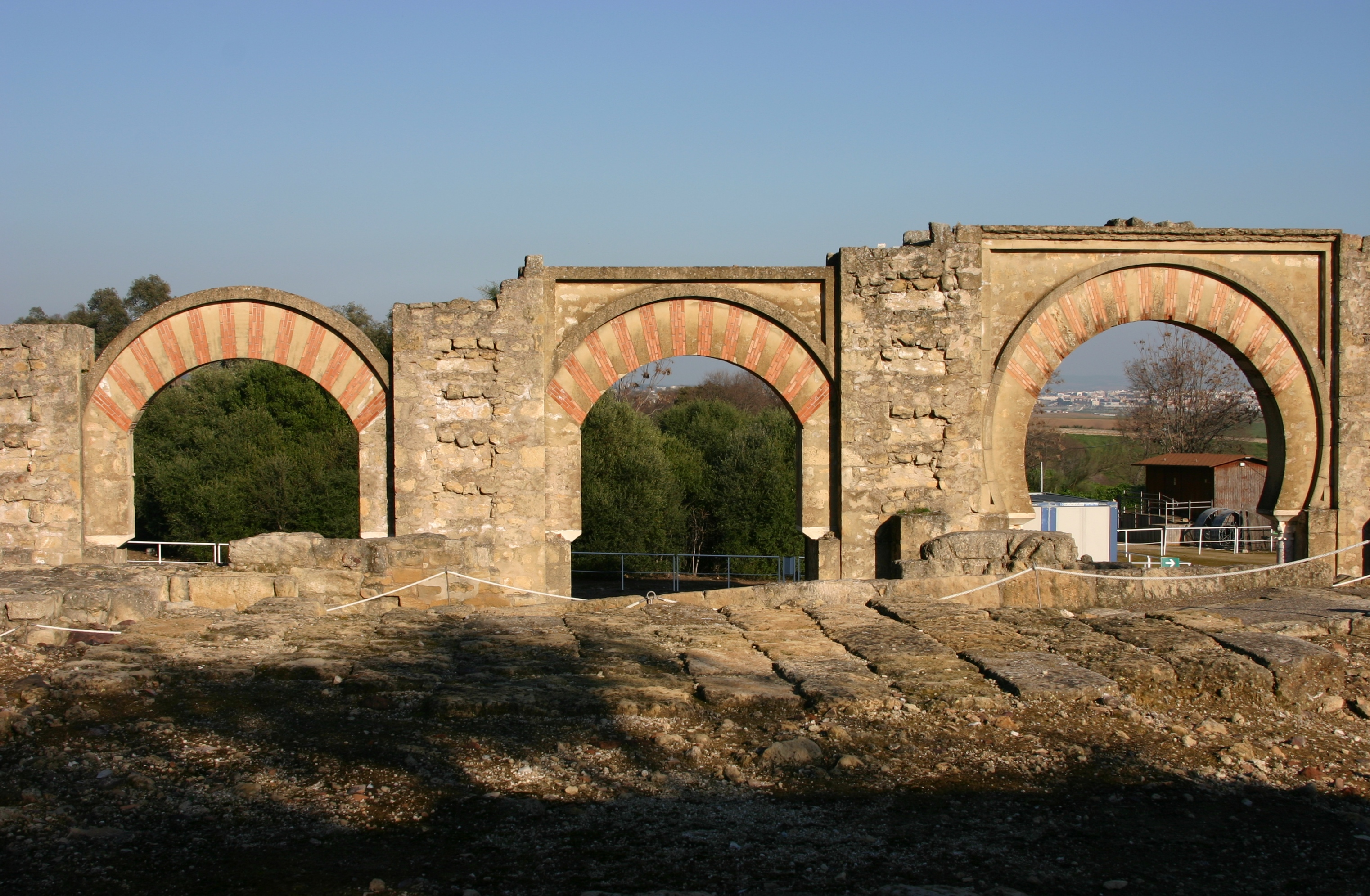
Portico arch remains of the Madinat al-Zahra in Córdoba

== Extant Alcázars ==
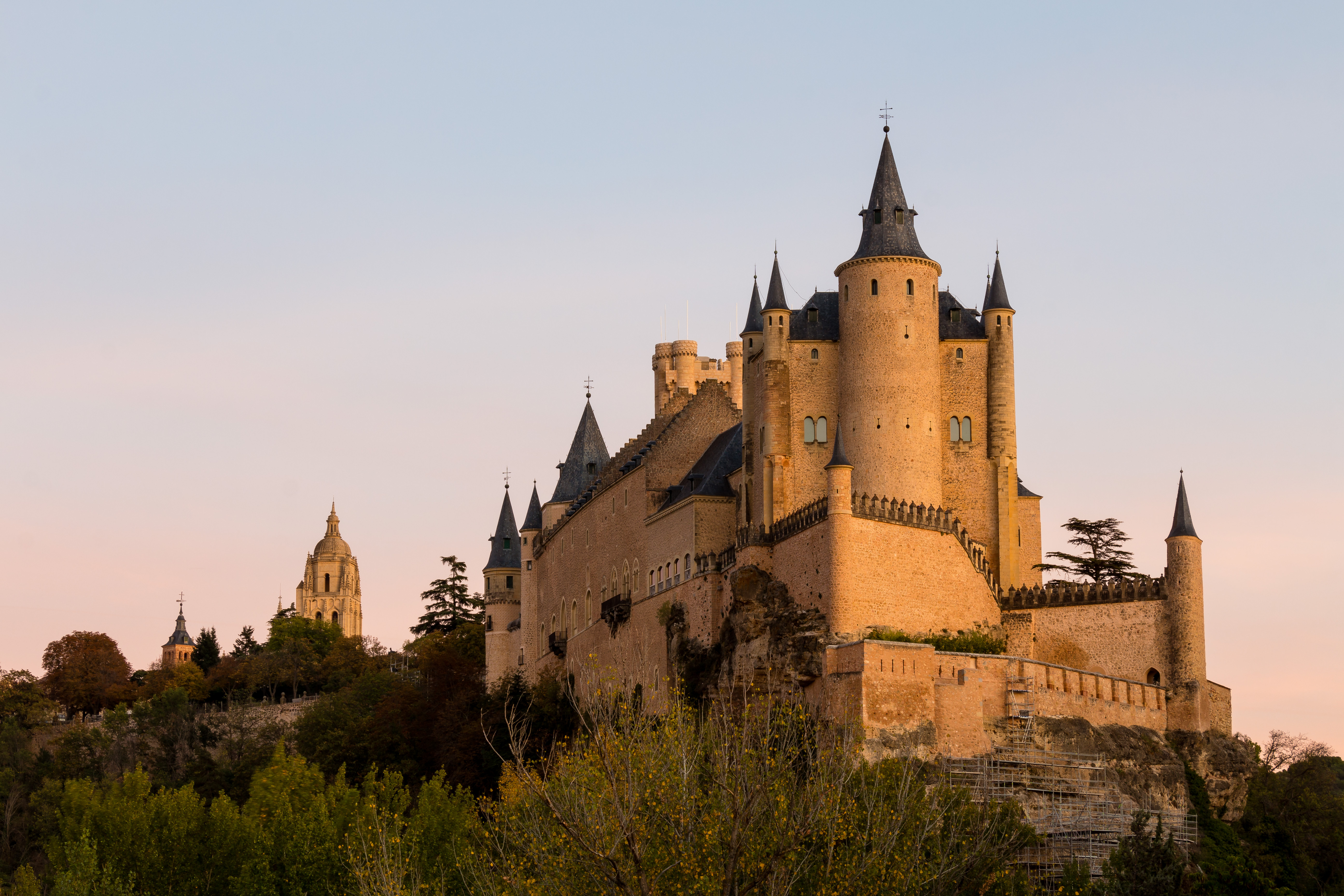
Alcázar of Segovia

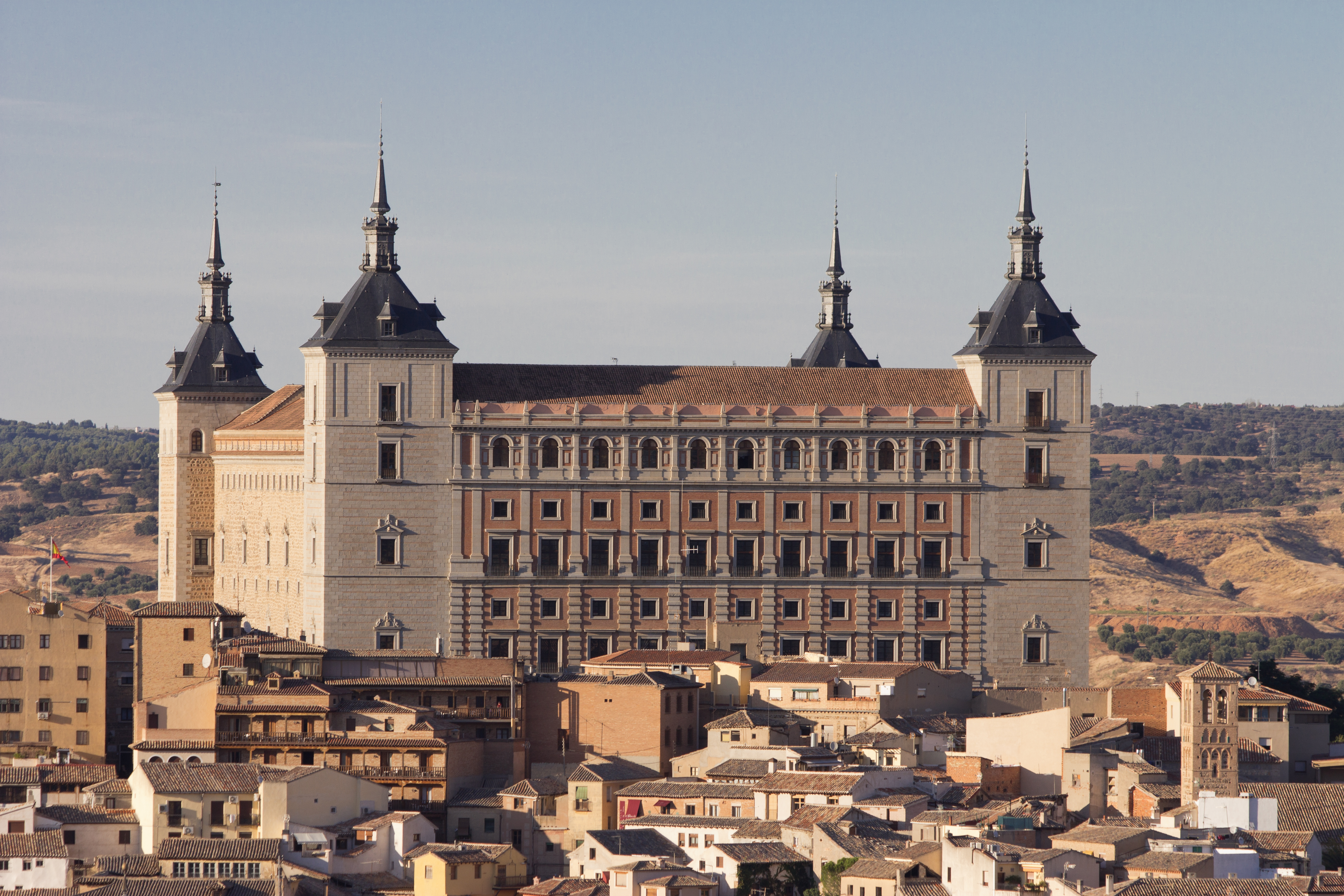
View of the Alcázar of Toledo

- Alcázar de los Reyes Cristianos, also called "the Alcázar of Córdoba", located in Córdoba, Andalusia, is an Islamic palace that became a Christian site after the 13th century Reconquista of Córdoba. The Muslims had expanded a Visigoth fortress into a large compound with gardens and a large library. This alcázar was the summer home of King Ferdinand II of Aragon and Queen Isabella I of Castile, and the site of their meeting with Christopher Columbus before his famous voyage to the Americas.
- The Alcázar of the Caliphs of Córdoba was the seat of the government of al-Andalus, and the residence of the emirs and caliphs of Córdoba since the arrival of the Muslims in the 8th century until the Christian conquest of the city, in 1236. It had a total area of 39,000 square metres (420,000 sq ft). Part of its structure survives.
- Alcázar of Jerez de la Frontera, was a fortified palace-city located in Southern Spain. In 1931, it was designated as a Spanish Historic site, Bien de Interés Cultural. Today, it functions as a public park for locals in Jerez de la Frontera.
- Alcázar of Segovia was first cited in the 12th century, though its foundations date back to Roman times. It is a castle built by the Christian monarchs in the place of an Islamic fort. During the Middle Ages when in the Kingdom of Castile, the alcázar of Segovia was the favorite residence of the Castilian monarchs, and almost each successive king added new parts to the building, transforming the original fortress into a courtier residence and prolonging the construction of the castle until the 16th century, when king Philip II added the conical spires and the slate roofs. A fire in 1862 destroyed part of the roofs, but they were restored in the very same style in which they were built 300 years before. In this castle there was the proclamation of Isabella I as Queen of Castile in 1474 starting the War of the Castilian Succession.
- Alcázar of Seville, on the site of the palace of the Almohad Caliphate called al-Muwarak, was built in the 1360s by Christian Castilian craftsmen in Mudéjar style, and frequently remodeled. It was first used by Peter of Castile with his mistress María de Padilla. The structures and gardens are a UNESCO World Heritage Site.
- Alcázar of Toledo was formerly used as a Roman palace in the 3rd century and then restored under Charles V. It was then used as a military academy in modern times. The Siege of the Alcázar in the Spanish Civil War references this castle, which was held by the Nationalist colonel José Moscardó Ituarte against Republican forces. Republican forces captured Moscardó's 24-year-old son Luis, and on 23 July 1936 informed Moscardó that if he did not turn over the alcázar within ten minutes his son would die. When Moscardó did not surrender, Luis was murdered, not immediately but one month later, on 23 August.
- The Alhambra in Granada, a palace and complex fortress. It was the last Muslim stronghold in al-Andalus before it functioned as a royal Christian palace following the Reconquista. Today it serves as one of Spain's most popular tourist sites.

=== Extinct landmark alcázars ===
- The Castle of Burgos was originally built by Muslims in Spain but became known as a royal residence commonly used by the kings of Castile. It lost value after the Habsburg family acquired the palace and following its partial destruction at the hands of French forces in 1813. Citizens attempted to partially restore the palace in the late 20th century, it now hosts a museum where visitors can view remaining portions of the castle grounds.
- The Royal Alcazar of Madrid was a palace built by Holy Roman Emperor Charles V, (rebuilt by his son, Philip II) and was the main royal residence in Madrid until the Buen Retiro Palace partly superseded it in the 17th century. It was destroyed by fire in 1734, and the present Royal Palace of Madrid was built on the site.
- The Castle Alcázar of Segorbe, province of Castellón, autonomous community of Valencia, was an enormous complex that for over a thousand years was the residence of lords, dukes and kings.

=== Outside Spain ===
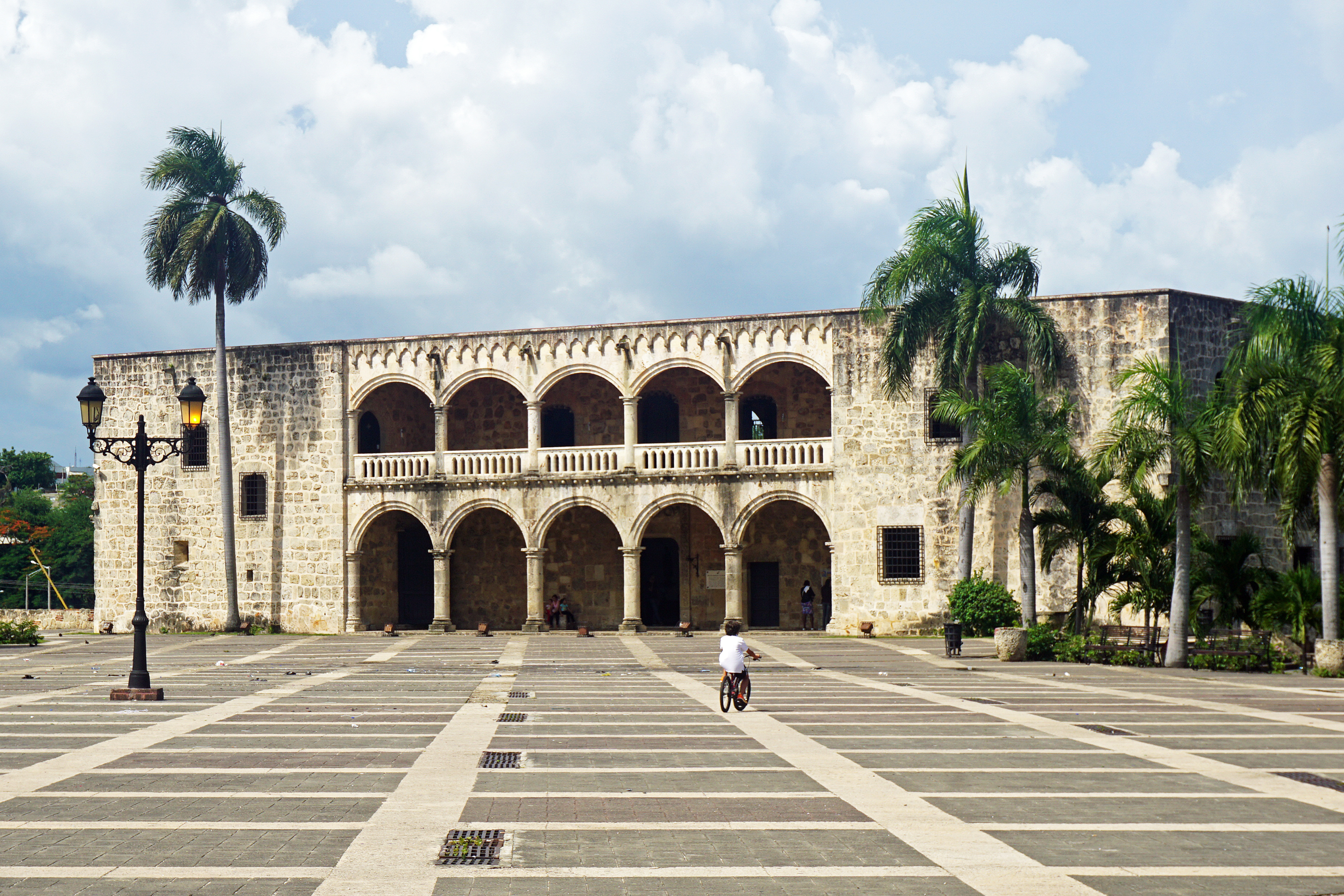
Alcázar de Colón, Santo Domingo, Dominican Republic

Outside Spain, in Palermo, Sicily, the Cassaro corresponds to the Punic settlement of Zis, on high ground that was refortified by the Arabs and known as al-qaṣr and was further expanded as the site of the later Norman palace.

The colonial palace in Santo Domingo, built for Christopher Columbus's son Diego in 1509, is called the Alcázar de Colón (Columbus's alcázar).

== See also ==
- Kremlin (fortification)
- Moorish Castle, Gibraltar
