= Vistabella del Maestrat =

Vistabella del Maestrat Vistabella del Maestrazgo
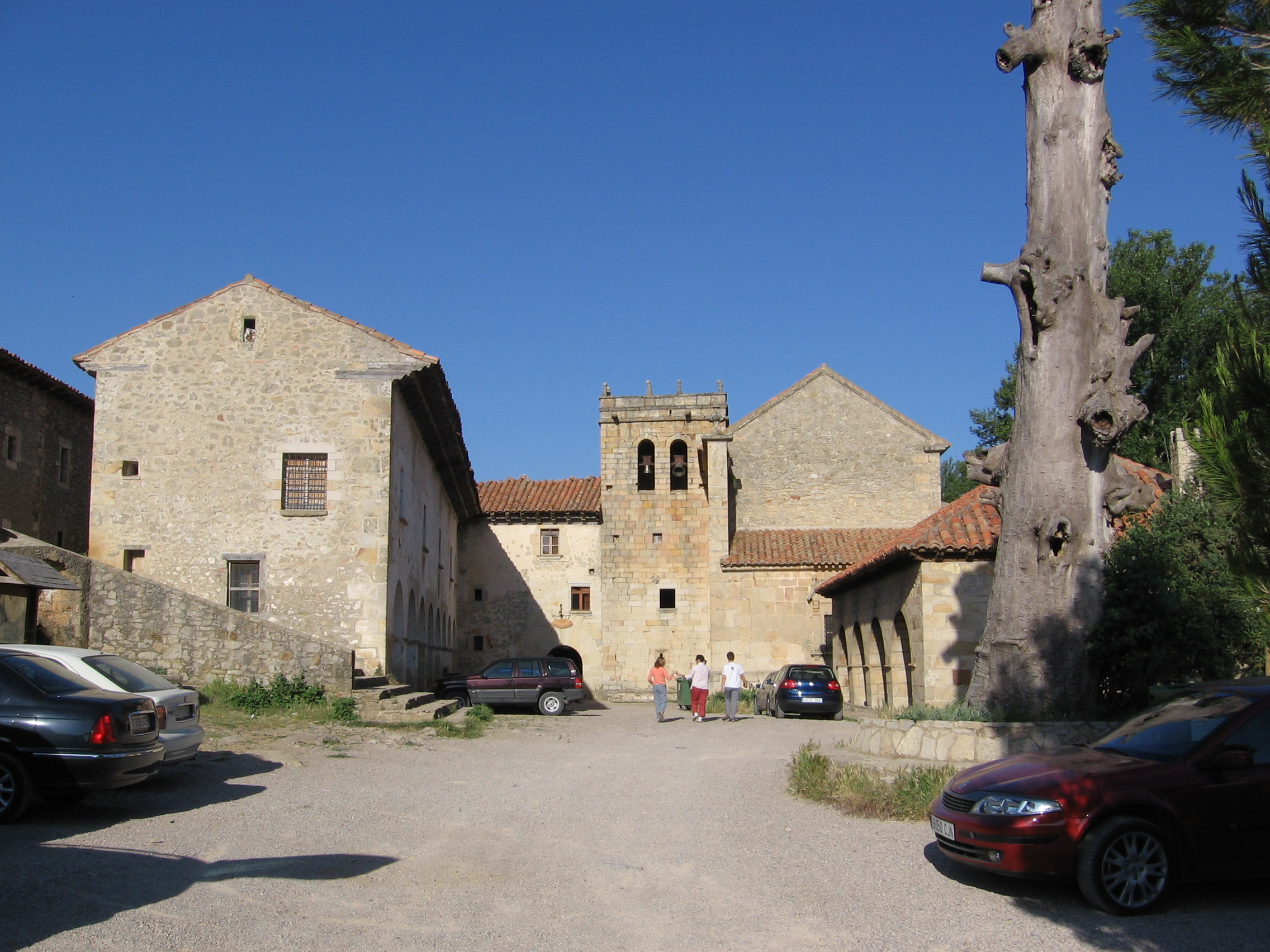
- Sanctuary of Sant Joan de Penyagolosa.

- Coat of arms

- Location of Vistabella del Maestrazgo in Spain Vistabella del Maestrat (Valencian Community) Vistabella del Maestrat (Spain)
- Coordinates: 40°18′N 0°17′W
- Country: Spain
- Autonomous community: Valencian Community
- Province: Castellón
- Comarca: Alt Maestrat

Government
  - Mayor: Jordi Alcon Molina

Area
  - Total: 151 km^{2} (58 sq mi)
- Elevation: 1,246 m (4,088 ft)

Population (2025-01-01)
  - Total: 354
  - Density: 2.34/km^{2} (6.07/sq mi)
- Demonym(s): vistabellà, -ana (Val.) vistabellino, -a (Sp.)
- Official language(s): Valencian; Spanish

Vistabella del Maestrat (Valencian: [ˌvistaˈbeʎa ðel maesˈtɾat]; Spanish: Vistabella del Maestrazgo [ˌbistaˈβeʎa ðel maesˈtɾaθɡo]) is a municipality in the comarca of Alt Maestrat, Castellon, Valencia, Spain. It is bordered by the municipalities of Vilafranca, Benassal, Culla, Benafigos, Atzeneta del Maestrat, Xodos, and Villahermosa in the province of Castellon; and Mosqueruela y Puertomingalvo in the province of Teruel. It is located in El massís de Penyagolosa and it is the highest municipality in the Valencian Community with 1,246 m of altitude.

== See also ==
- Asensio Nebot
- Penyagolosa
