= Serra d'En Celler =

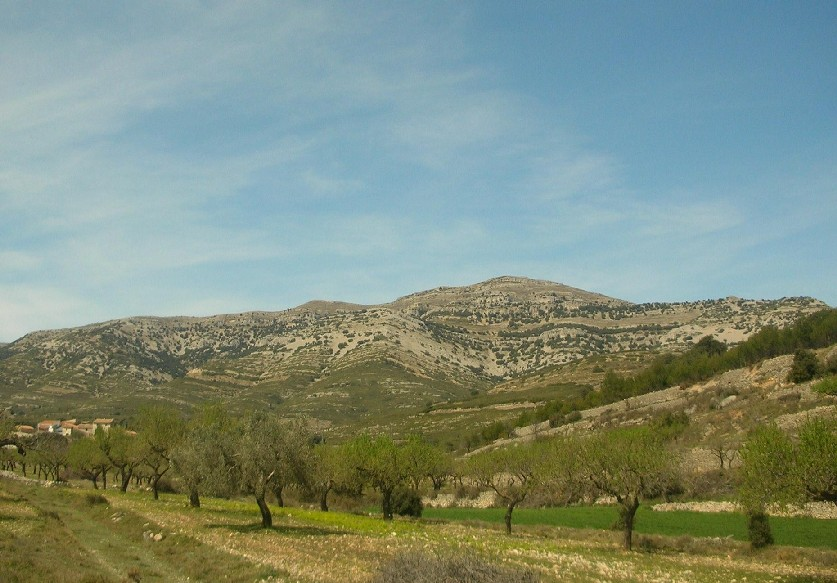
- Tossal de la Nevera near Catí

Highest point
- Peak: Tossal de la Nevera
- Elevation: 1,147 m (3,763 ft)
- Listing: List of mountains in the Valencian Community
- Coordinates: 40°23′15″N 0°04′15″W

Geography
- Location within Spain
- Location: Alt Maestrat (Valencian Community)
- Parent range: Iberian System

Geology
- Orogeny: Alpine orogeny
- Rock type: Limestone

Serra d'En Celler is a mountain range of the Valencian Community, Spain. Its main peaks are 1,281 m high Tossal de la Nevera and Tossal d'Orenga (1,144 m).

== Geography ==
The heights of the Serra d'En Celler range are frequently covered with snow every winter and Tossal de la Nevera, its highest peak, is named after an ice pit (nevera), where snow was gathered for local use in former times.

This mountain range is located within the Ares del Maestrat and Catí municipal terms, in a relatively uninhabited area. The easiest route to reach it is from Catí or Albocàsser. Tossal d'Orenga is a popular mountain among those who do paragliding in the region.

== See also ==
- Alt Maestrat
- Mountains of the Valencian Community
- La Valltorta
