= Catí =

- Municipality
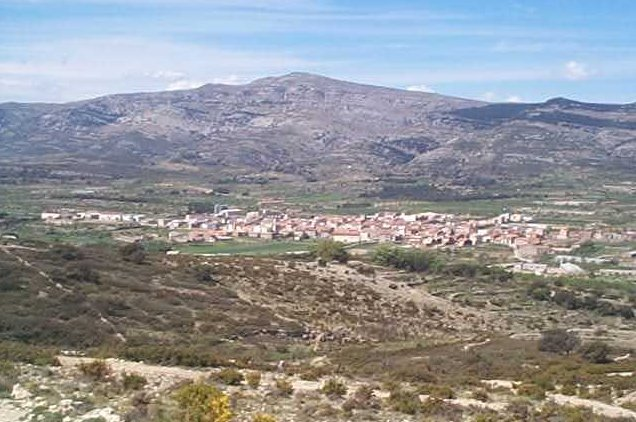
- Poblecati

- Coat of arms

- Location in Spain
- Coordinates: 40°28′17″N 0°1′20″W
- Country: Spain
- Autonomous community: Valencian Community
- Province: Castellón
- Comarca: Alt Maestrat
- Judicial district: Castelló de la Plana

Government
  - Alcalde: Manuel Puig Puig

Area
  - Total: 102.3 km^{2} (39.5 sq mi)
- Elevation: 661 m (2,169 ft)

Population (2025-01-01)
  - Total: 719
  - Density: 7.03/km^{2} (18.2/sq mi)
- Demonym(s): Catinenc, catinenca
- Time zone: UTC+1 (CET)
  - Summer (DST): UTC+2 (CEST)
- Postal code: 12513
- Official language(s): Valencian
- Website: Official website

Catí is a municipality in the comarca of Alt Maestrat, Castellón, Valencia, Spain.

The municipality of Catí limits with the following municipal terms: Ares del Maestrat, Morella, Chert, Tírig, La Salzadella, Sant Mateu and Albocàsser all of them located in the province of Castellón.

== Geography ==
Catí is situated at 661 metres (2,169 ft) above sea level, in the midst of a broad valley which is called "Catí Corridor" in the Alt Maestrat region. Geographically this area marks the boundary between the Ports region to which Catí belonged historically, and the Baix Maestrat, the centre of the mountainous area that connects El Ports of Morella with the Maestrat mountains, like Serra de Vallivana, Serra d'En Celler, Tossal de la Nevera and Tossal de la Barbuda.

== Villages ==
The municipality of Catí includes the following villages and hamlets:

- L'Avellà.
- Hostal del Mestre.
- Masía Costereta.
- Masía d'En Ramon.
- Masía de Evaristo.
- Masía de Gatella.
- Masía de Jaime Vicente.
- Masía de Roblasco.
- Masía de Segarra de Arriba.
- Masía Font Nova.

== History ==
On January 25, 1239, Catí was given to populate by Blasco of Alagón to Ramon de Bocona and to forty residents more, this fact was confirmed by king James I of Aragon. The surnames of those neighbors are supposed to come from the land of Lleida. Fidelity was Ramon de Bocona's main virtue which is recognized in his shield weapon whose main figure is walking a dog, a symbol of active loyalty.

Catí has participated in many of the historic events surrounding nearby Morella. Knights from Catí took part in the conquest of Mazalquivir, Oran and Bougie, in the ship belonging to the Bayle of Morella, despite the fact that the town of Catí, along with other neighboring villages, began in 1292 a lawsuit against Morella. The matter was not settled until 1691.
