= Serra d'Esparreguera =

Mountain range in Spain

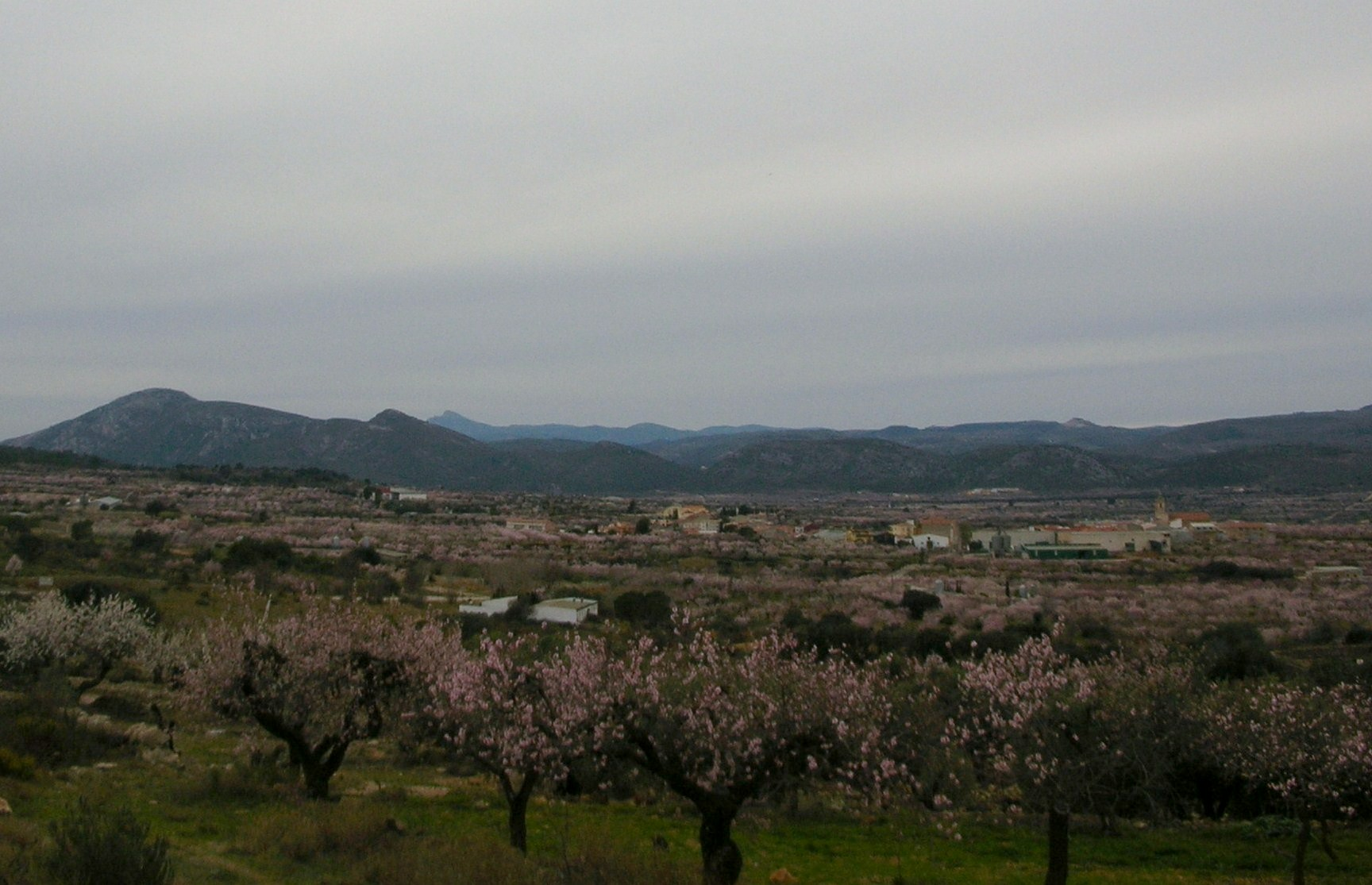
- Eastern end of the Serra d'Esparreguera, near Albocàsser; the Penyagolosa can be discerned in the distance

Highest point
- Elevation: 1,087 m (3,566 ft)
- Listing: List of mountains in the Valencian Community
- Coordinates: 40°18′31″N 0°5′21″W

Geography
- Location within Spain
- Location: Alt Maestrat, Valencian Community
- Parent range: Iberian System, Eastern end

Geology
- Mountain type: Karstic

Climbing
- Easiest route: From Culla or from La Torre d'En Besora

Serra de d'Esparreguera or Serra Esparreguera (Spanish: Sierra de Esparraguera, although the spellings Sierra de Espaneguera or Sierra Espaneguera are common in many maps) is an over 17 km (11 mi) long mountain range in the Alt Maestrat comarca, Valencian Community, Spain.

== Geography ==
This mountain chain rises abruptly from a plain and looks quite impressive from certain angles. It extends in a roughly SW-NE direction between Atzeneta del Maestrat and Albocàsser. Its highest point is 1087 m high Esparreguera; another important summit is Morral Blanc (1060 m). These mountains are frequently covered in snow in the winter.

== See also ==
- Culla
- Mountains of the Valencian Community
