= Tossal d'Orenga =

Mountain in Spain

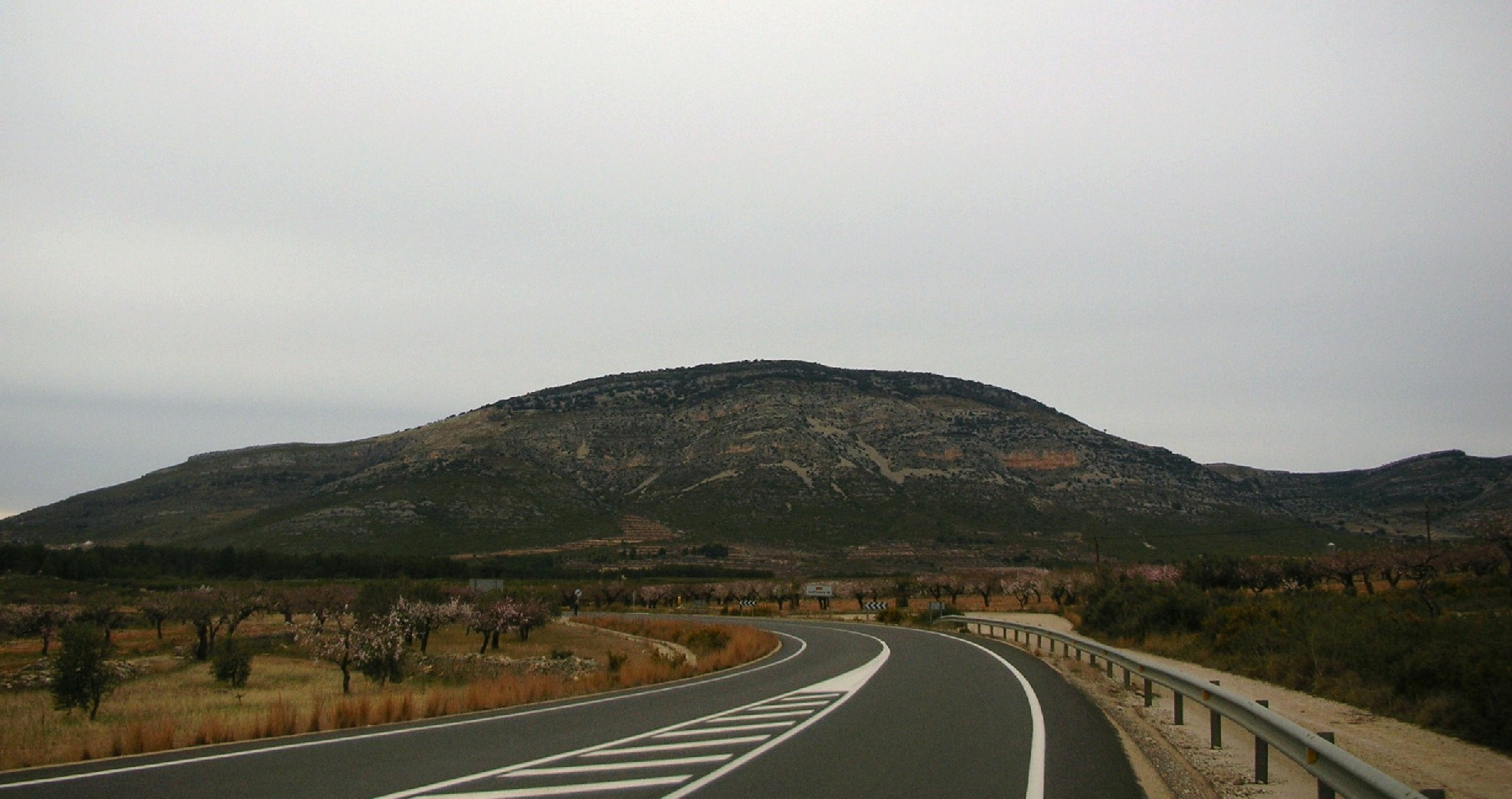
- Tossal d'Orenga seen from the CV-15 road

Highest point
- Elevation: 1,144 m (3,753 ft)
- Listing: List of mountains in the Valencian Community
- Coordinates: 40°23′15″N 0°04′15″W

Geography
- Location within Spain
- Location: Alt Maestrat (Valencian Community)
- Parent range: Serra d'En Celler, Sistema Ibérico

Geology
- Mountain type: Limestone

Climbing
- First ascent: Unknown
- Easiest route: From Albocàsser

Tossal d'Orenga is a mountain of the Serra d'En Celler range, Valencian Community, Spain. It reaches an elevation of 1,144 metres (3,753 ft) above sea level. Its name means literally "Peak of Oregano" in Catalan, owing to the presence of the herb in its slopes.

Located within the Ares del Maestrat municipal term, in a relatively uninhabited area, close to the CV-12 road, it is a popular mountain among those who do paragliding in the region.

== See also ==
- Albocàsser
- Mountains of the Valencian Community
