= Atzeneta =

Atzeneta may refer to:

- Atzeneta del Maestrat or Adzaneta, a municipality in the province of Castellón, Spain
- Atzeneta d'Albaida, a municipality in the province of València, Spain
- Atzeneta Unió Esportiva or Atzeneta UE, a football club based in Atzeneta d'Albaida
