= Castillo o Torre =

Ruins in Valencia, Spain

Coordinates: 40.326944°N 0.078889°W

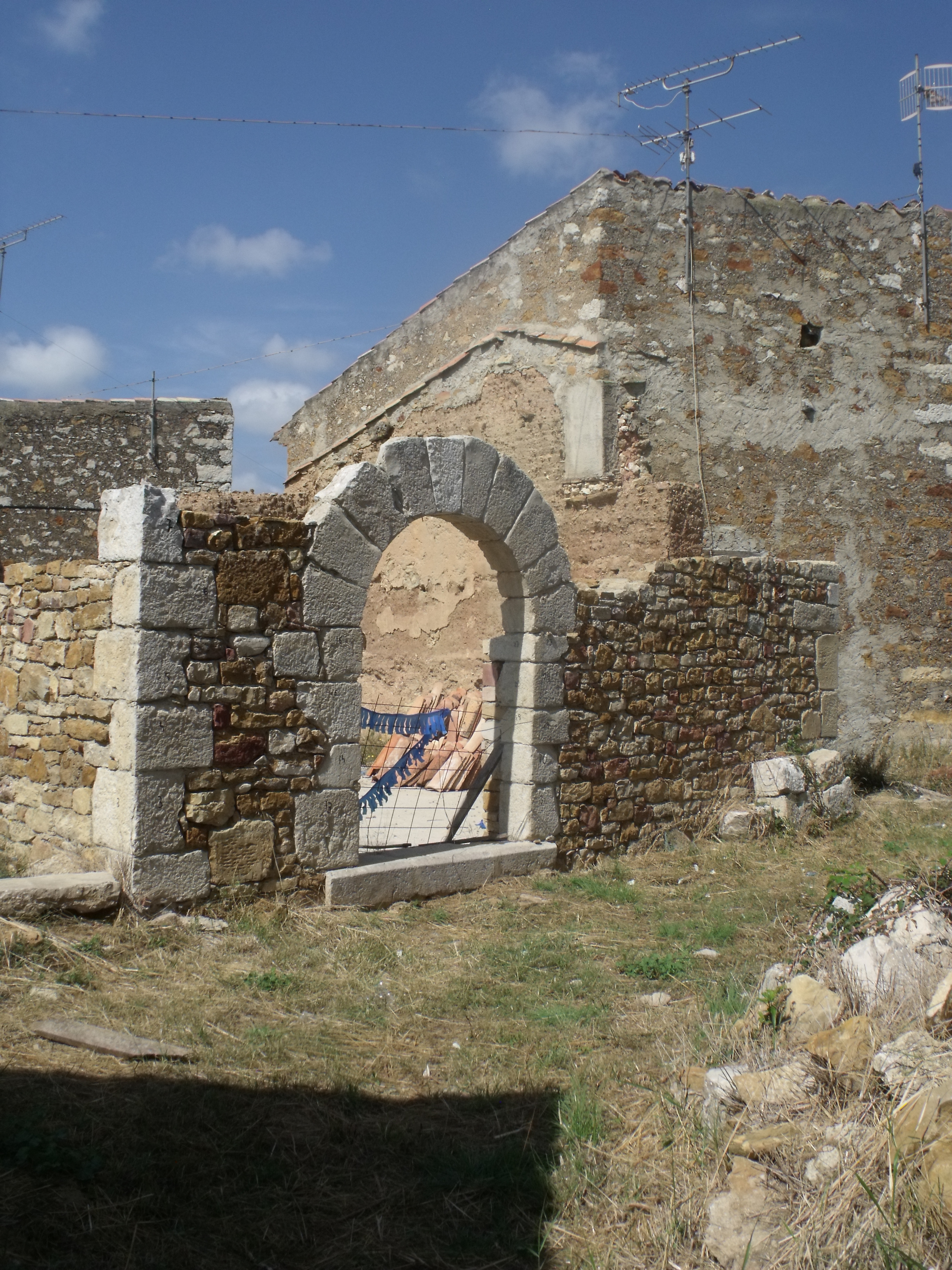
Castillo o Torro

Castillo o Torre (Castle and Tower) is located in La Torre d'En Besora, comarca of Alt Maestrat, Castellón, Valencia, Spain. The ruins are classified as a Bien de Interés Cultural landmark, "Monumento por declaración genérica" (12.02.119.001 Code). The town of La Torre d'En Besora began as an Arab farmhouse, though archaeological investigations later came to believe that there might have been previous Iberian settlement in the area. This settlement was known as "Vinrabino", and it had a defensive tower, as was common at the time. After the troops of Jaime I of Aragon reconquered these lands, the settlement was renamed "Tower of Vinrabí", and it was subsequently affiliated with Blasco de Alagón, Guillem de Anglesola, and Ramon de Besora. During the time of Besora, he was awarded the Town Charter on January 5, 1274. He decided to rebuild, in part, the tower of the old Muslim farmstead, and added an adjoining fortified manor house next to it. The village which grew around it became known as "La Torre d'En Besora", Hispanicized as "Torre de Embesora", and it came to mean "Torre del señor Besora" (tower of Mr. Besora). Over time, the strategic importance of the castle diminished, which led to its abandonment and ruin. Some of its materials were used for the construction of the parish church of St. Bartholomew during the 18th century.

== Bibliography ==
- Castillo, Torres y Fortalezas de la Comunidad Valenciana. VV.AA. Editorial Prensa Valenciana S.A. 1995. Valencia. Pág.133. Depósito legal:V. 4373-1995.
