= Asensio Nebot =

Friar and rebel in the Peninsular War

Asensio Nebot, known as "The Friar" and born in Nules, Spain in 1779, was a guerrilla in the Kingdom of Valencia during the Peninsular War. His exploits during the Peninsular War are well documented but, as he worked as a secret agent after the end of the war, there are gaps in what is known about his life from 1815 onwards.

== Peninsular War ==
Asensio Nebot was born in Nules in 1779. He entered the Monastery of Nuestra Señora del Rosario in Villarreal at a very early age to study to become a Franciscan friar. In 1809 the monastery was closed and Nebot joined the fight against the French after Napoleon's invasion of Spain in the Peninsular War. Nebot fought as a guerrilla and was known as El Fraile or Padre Nebot because of his Franciscan education. He assembled an army of 4,000 men with a cavalry of 500 and a rifle brigade, Tupper’s Rifles, so called because the guns and money had been provided by Peter Charles Tupper, a wealthy British businessman who lived in Valencia. The Friar set up his headquarters at Vistabella del Maestrat, an inaccessible village in Castellón. He harassed the French with ambushes and surprise attacks. He stopped their provisions and mail from reaching their destinations, destroyed their supplies and took possession of their horses and weapons.

French forces under Louis-Gabriel Suchet took Valencia in 1812 and many Valencians accepted the occupation without protest. Nebot not only led his men in attacks on the French but also established factories where bullets were cast and weapons and harnesses were repaired, stores for the provisions he collected and workshops where uniforms were made. He was influenced by the Liberal brothers Vicente and Manuel Bertrán de Lis and when the anti-feudal Spanish Constitution of 1812 was approved in Cádiz he made sure that elections were held in all the towns that he controlled and that Liberals were elected. As well as skirmishes, he attacked French garrisons in Castellón, Nules and Artana. He took his prisoners to Vistabella where they were locked in a jail under which there were more than 20 barrels of gunpowder in case there was an attempt to free them. In 1813 there were more than 500 French soldiers in this jail.

Mazzuchelli, the Governor of Valencia, offered a reward of 5,000 pesetas for the Friar alive and 4,000 for him dead. Nebot responded by offering two small coins for Mazzuchelli alive and one coin for his head. As well as killing French soldiers, he also executed Spaniards who collaborated with the French occupation. He attacked convoys that were taking Spanish prisoners to France and managed to release a good number of them. From his attacks he collected well over a hundred horses and very many weapons, including a cannon.

As his troops had not been able to capture Nebot, Suchet offered three criminals who had been condemned to death their liberty, 5,000 pesetas and employment if they would infiltrate Nebot's guerillas and then murder him. Tupper tried to warn the Friar but the three criminals confessed as soon as they reached Nebot and joined his brigade.

On 18 May 1813 Nebot took Morella but had to abandon it when the French army approached. On 14 July, Nebot entered Vinaròs and set up his headquarters at Benicarló. On 20 July he attacked Morella again with 3,000 men, breached the city walls and forced the French to take refuge in the castle. They finally surrendered on 21 October. In December, according to some historians, he attacked the French garrison in Denia and forced them to surrender.

== Restoration of King Ferdinand VII and popular revolt ==
Following the signing of the Treaty of Valençay, King Ferdinand VII returned to Spain in March 1814, resuming the throne that Napoleon had forced him to abdicate in 1808. Ferdinand rejected the liberal Constitution of 1812 that had been implemented in his absence and began a ferocious campaign of repression to restore the absolute monarchy, which was led by General Francisco Javier de Elío.

Nebot worked for the Bertrán de Lis brothers, conspiring against the King and organizing revolts against the monarchy. He also went around Valencia inciting the peasants to revolt against their feudal lords. In January he took part in an attempt to assassinate Elío. Four men were arrested and executed and Nebot and Manuel Bertrán de Lis had to flee to Gibraltar. Later that year Vicente Bertrán de Lis sent Nebot to London to buy 2,000 rifles for the Bertrán de Lis group for a planned uprising. There was another attempt to kill Elío in January 1819; twenty-two men, including one of the sons of Vicente Bertrán de Lis, were arrested and executed.

In 1820 the brothers sent Nebot to Cádiz to ask for men, weapons and ships to proclaim the Constitution of 1812 in Valencia. The organizers of Rafael del Riego’s anti-monarchical uprising were in Cádiz at this time. Nebot was promoted to Brigadier and gave him the men and ships he requested. He set sail for Valencia but there was a violent storm and his ships were separated and forced ashore further south. By the time Nesbot's forces reached Valencia, Ferdinand VII had already accepted the Constitution, ushering in the Trienio Liberal government. In 1822 Nebot joined the supporters of the new Liberal government and was involved in street fighting against the Spanish Royal Guard. On 4 September 1822 he was in Valencia to witness the execution of Elío. In 1822 and 1823 he and the brothers were fighting against the Royalist troops in Valencia.

== Life abroad ==
In 1824 Ferdinand asked the French for help to restore an absolute monarchy and an army of French and Belgian volunteers, the Hundred Thousand Sons of Saint Louis, invaded Spain. The Liberals were defeated and many of them fled abroad, including Nebot who settled in London. In 1825 he went on a secret mission to Ireland on behalf of Lord William Bentinck and he may have visited Ireland again after this. Historian Charles M. Wilson assumes that Nebot took part in a failed attempt to enter Spain through Portugal in 1827 and was involved in the July Revolution in Paris in July 1830 and in the planned invasion of northern Spain across the Pyrenees in October 1830. In January 1831 Nebot wrote to the Spanish ambassador in London, Francisco Cea Bermúdez, asking for permission to return to Spain. The Spanish government replied to Cea Bermúdez's letter saying that they did not trust Nebot but would allow him to return if he agreed to act as an anti-Liberal spy. Nebot reportedly never returned to Spain.
