= Vilar de Canes =

- Municipality
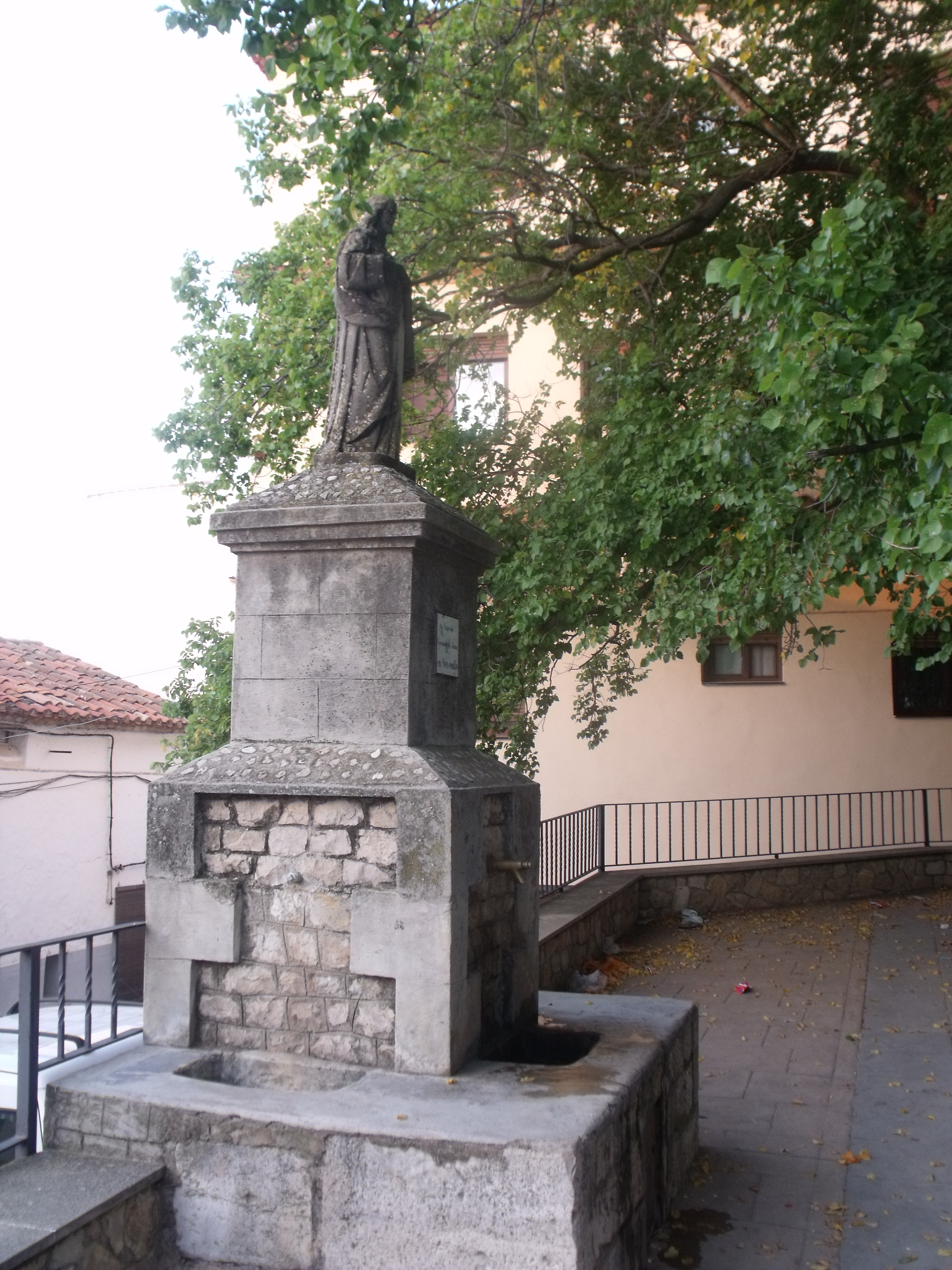
- Fountain of the Setena Square in Vilar de Canes.

- Flag Coat of arms

- Location of Vilar de Canes. Vilar de Canes (Valencian Community)
- Coordinates: 40.3333°N 0.166667°W
- Country: Spain
- Community: Valencia
- Province: Castellón
- Comarca: Alt Maestrat

Area
  - Total: 15.91 km^{2} (6.14 sq mi)

Population (2023)
  - Total: 159
  - Density: 9.99/km^{2} (25.9/sq mi)
- Time zone: UTC+1 (CET)
  - Summer (DST): UTC+2 (CEST)
- Postal code: 12162
- Website: www.vilardecanes.es

Vilar de Canes is a municipality in the comarca of Alt Maestrat, Castellón, Valencia, Spain.
