= La Torre d'en Besora =

- Municipality
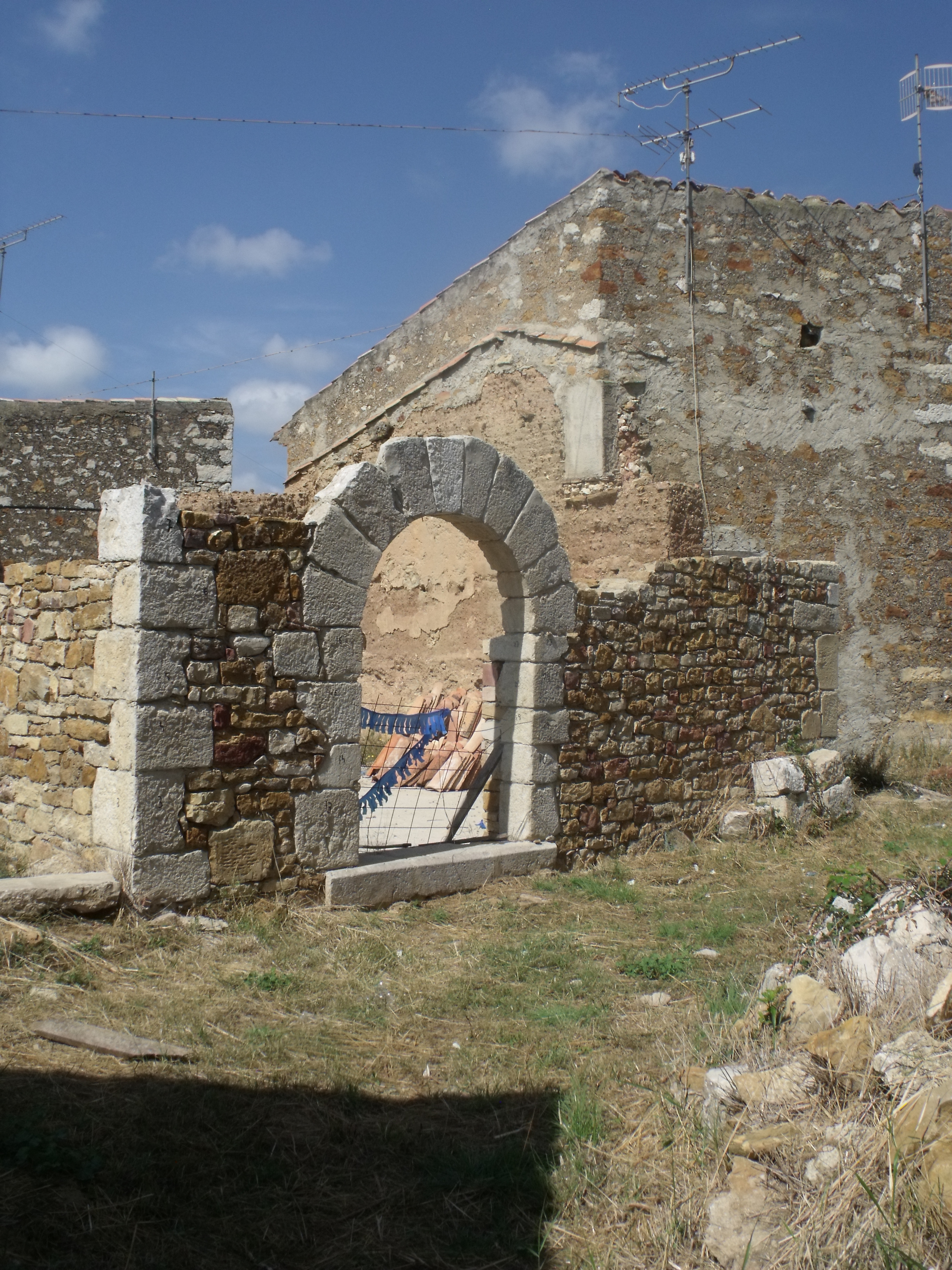

- Coat of arms

- Location in Spain
- Coordinates: 40°19′37″N 0°4′45″W
- Country: Spain
- Autonomous community: Valencian Community
- Province: Castellón
- Comarca: Alt Maestrat
- Judicial district: Castelló de la Plana

Area
  - Total: 11.7 km^{2} (4.5 sq mi)
- Elevation: 647 m (2,123 ft)

Population (2025-01-01)
  - Total: 164
  - Density: 14.0/km^{2} (36.3/sq mi)
- Demonym(s): Torretí, torretina
- Time zone: UTC+1 (CET)
  - Summer (DST): UTC+2 (CEST)
- Postal code: 12161
- Official language(s): Valencian

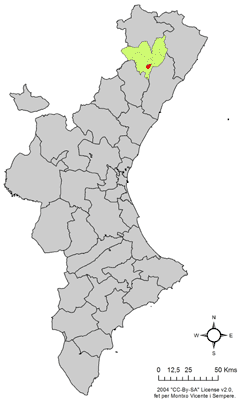
Location in the Valencian Community

La Torre d'en Besora is a municipality of Castellón, Valencia, Spain.

The town is located in the flat area of the comarca of Alt Maestrat, with the mountains of the Serra d'Esparreguera rising close to it. It has a population of 182 inhabitants.

== See also ==
- Castillo o Torre
