= Culla =

- Municipality
- Coat of arms

- Location in Spain
- Coordinates: 40°20′N 0°10′W
- Country: Spain
- Autonomous community: Valencian Community
- Province: Castellón
- Comarca: Alt Maestrat
- Judicial district: Castelló de la Plana

Area
  - Total: 116.3 km^{2} (44.9 sq mi)
- Elevation: 1,088 m (3,570 ft)

Population (2025-01-01)
  - Total: 503
  - Density: 4.33/km^{2} (11.2/sq mi)
- Demonym(s): Cullà, cullana
- Time zone: UTC+1 (CET)
  - Summer (DST): UTC+2 (CEST)
- Postal code: 12161
- Official language(s): Valencian

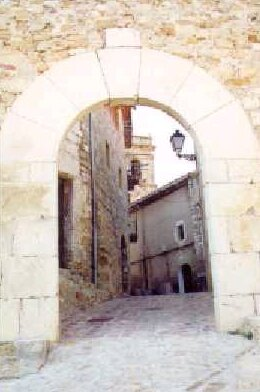
Town gate in Culla

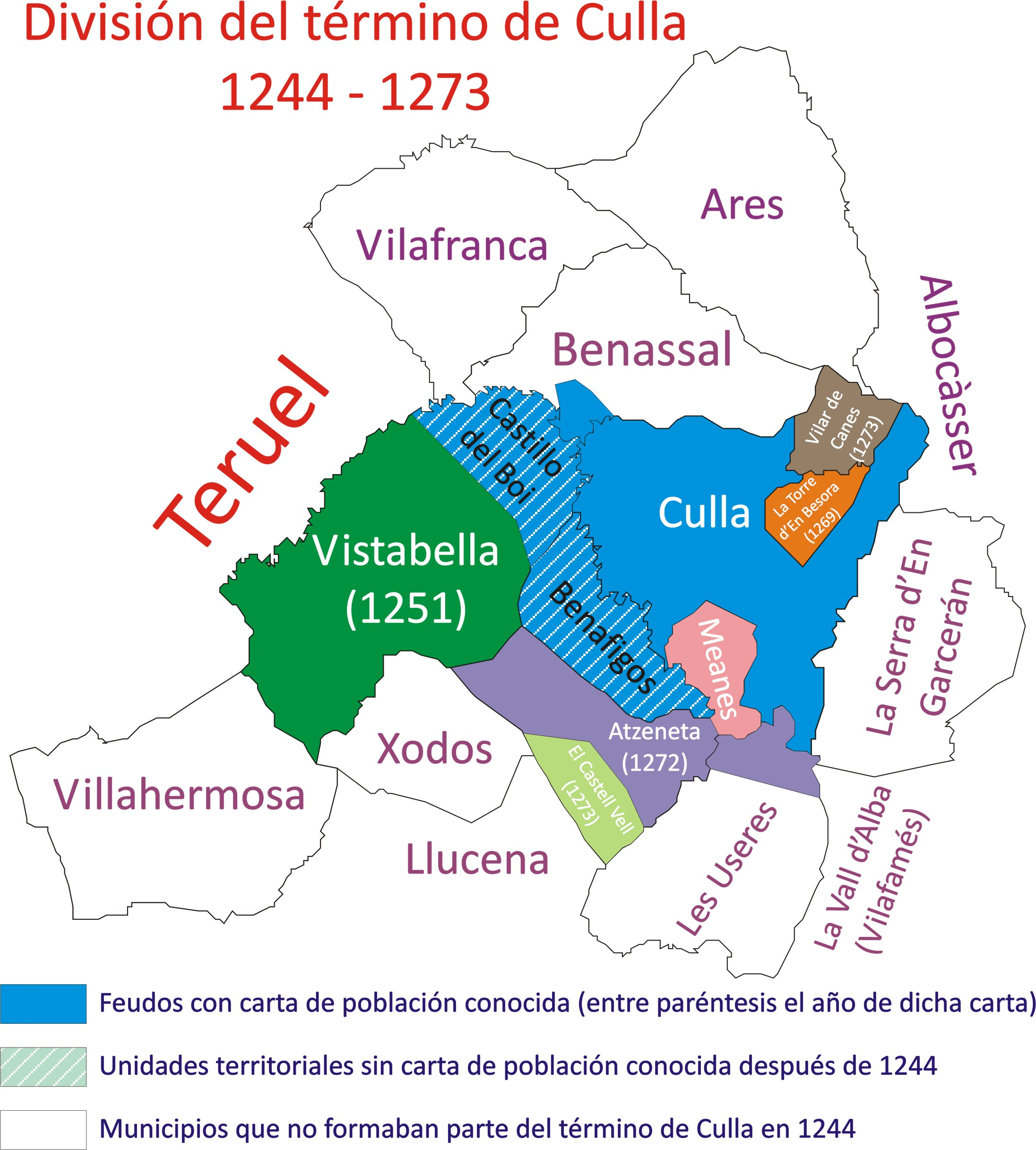
Culla's castle dominions between 1244 and 1273

Culla is a municipality in the comarca of Alt Maestrat, Castellón, Valencia, Spain.

The town is located on a 1,121 m high mountain, right to the SE of the town rises the 1,090 m high Tossal de la Serrà and further away the 1,087 m high Esparreguera, the tallest summit of the Serra d'Esparreguera. Nearby Montlleó River hides canyons only accessible from Culla.

Culla has a population of 633 inhabitants.

== History ==
The castle of the town was one of the main castles of the historical Maestrat area in ancient times.

== Villages ==
- Culla
- Paulo
- Sales de Matella
- Mel o Pla de La Torreta
- Riu Sec
- Molinell
- Monllat
- Pla del Sabater
