= Benassal =

- Municipality
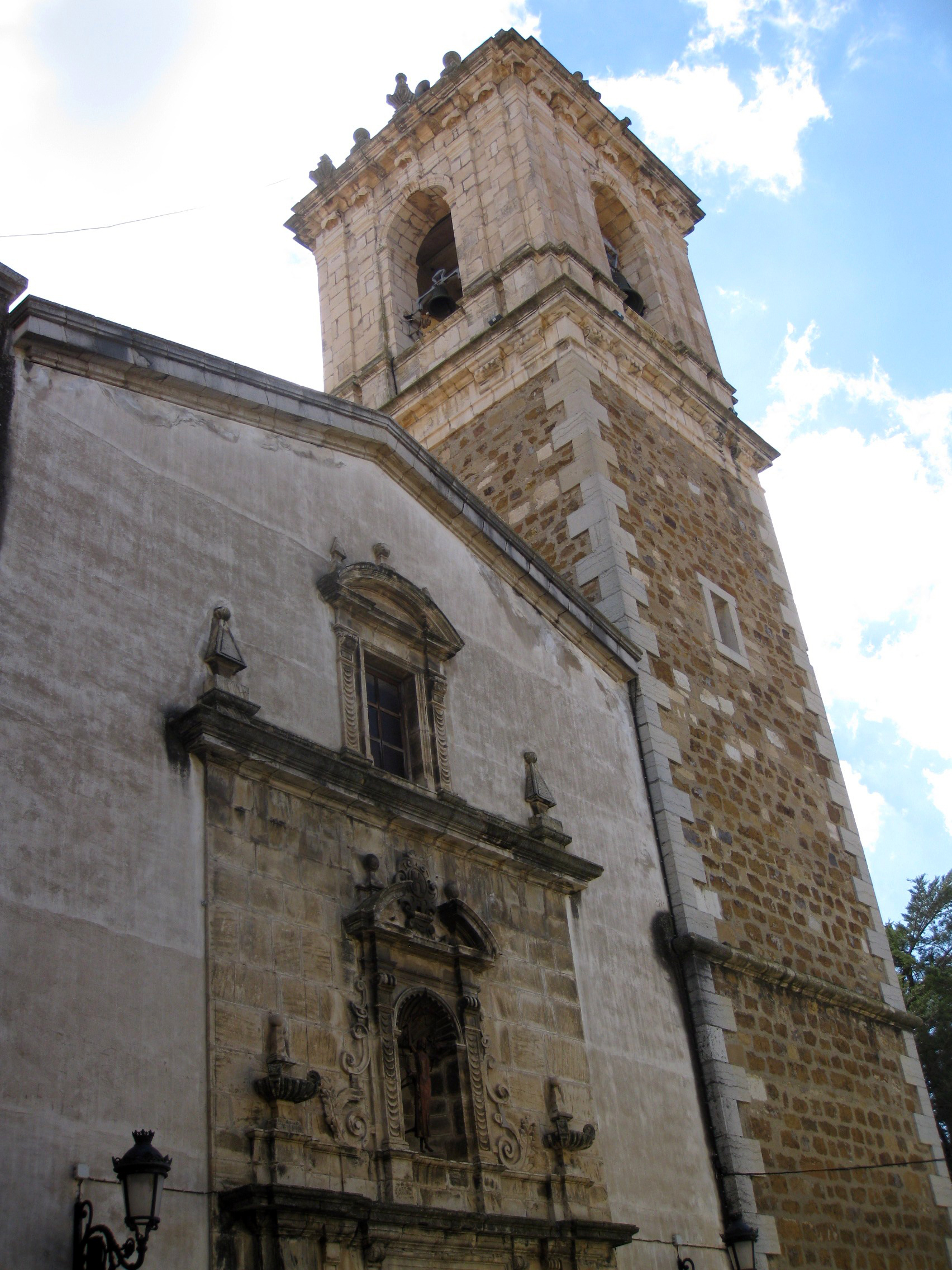
- The parish church of the Assumption in Benassal.

- Coat of arms

- Location of Benassal. Benassal (Valencian Community)
- Coordinates: 40°23′N 0°08′W
- Country: Spain
- Community: Valencia
- Province: Castellón
- Comarca: Alt Maestrat

Government
  - Mayor: Elia García Colom (PSOE)

Area
  - Total: 79.58 km^{2} (30.73 sq mi)

Population (2023)
  - Total: 1,026
  - Density: 12.89/km^{2} (33.39/sq mi)
- Time zone: UTC+1 (CET)
  - Summer (DST): UTC+2 (CEST)
- Postal code: 12160
- Website: www.benassal.es

Benassal is a municipality in the comarca of Alt Maestrat, Castellón, Valencia, Spain.

== See also ==
- List of municipalities in Castellón
