= Benafigos =

- Municipality
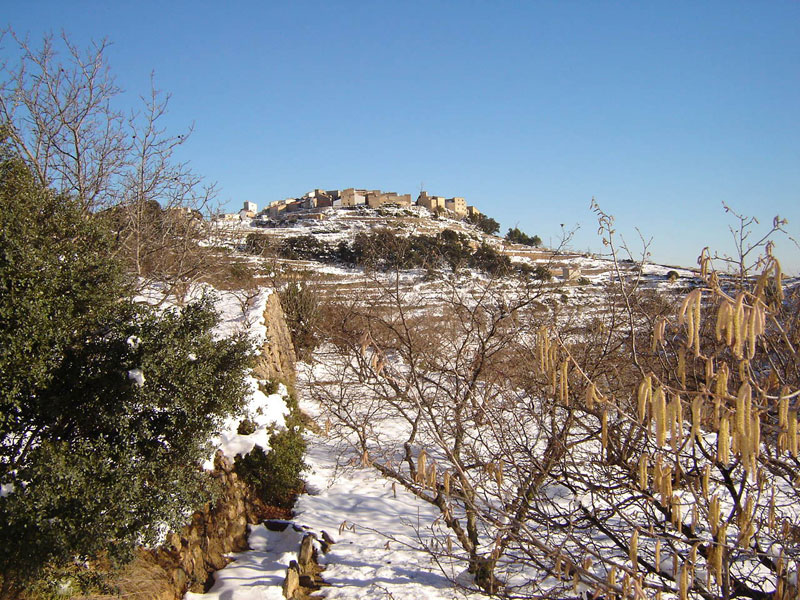

- Flag Coat of arms

- Location in Spain
- Coordinates: 40°16′35″N 0°12′34″W
- Country: Spain
- Autonomous community: Valencian Community
- Province: Castellón
- Comarca: Alt Maestrat
- Judicial district: Castelló de la Plana

Area
  - Total: 35.6 km^{2} (13.7 sq mi)
- Elevation: 945 m (3,100 ft)

Population (2025-01-01)
  - Total: 121
  - Density: 3.40/km^{2} (8.80/sq mi)
- Time zone: UTC+1 (CET)
  - Summer (DST): UTC+2 (CEST)
- Postal code: 12134
- Official language(s): Valencian
- Website: Official website

Benafigos is a municipality in the comarca of Alt Maestrat, Castellón Province, Valencia, Spain.

The village is located at high altitude between the Montlleó River and the Rambla de Benafigos. The climate of the village is continental with long, cold winters and hot summers, the temperature during the night on summer days is pleasant though.

== See also ==
- List of municipalities in Castellón
