= Tírig =

- Municipality
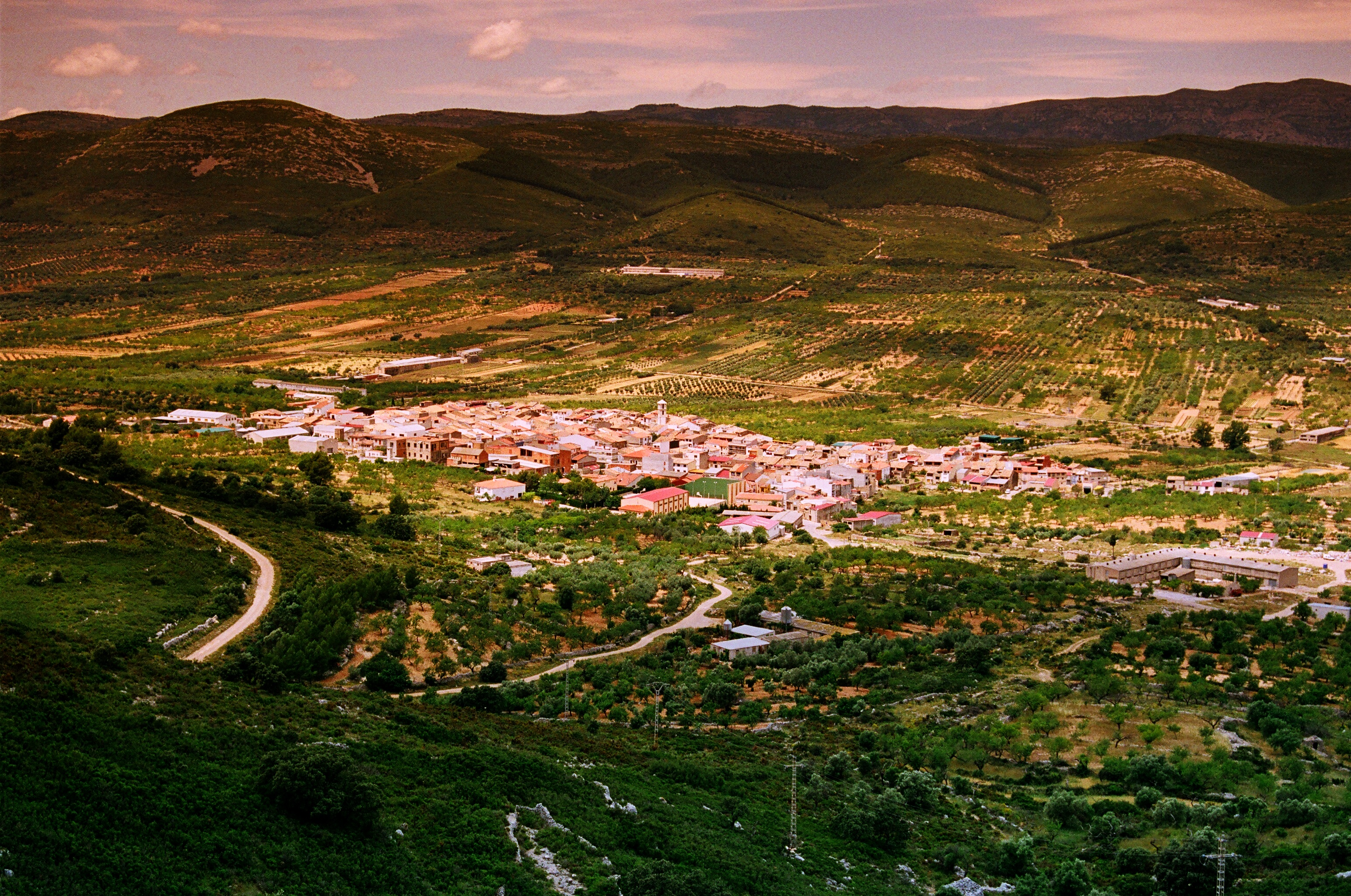
- View of Tírig

- Coat of arms

- Location of Tírig Tírig (Valencian Community)
- Coordinates: 40.424°N 0.077°E
- Country: Spain
- Community: Valencian Community
- Province: Castellón / Castelló
- Comarca: Alt Maestrat

Government
  - Mayor: Juan José Carreres Montull (PP)

Area
  - Total: 42.34 km^{2} (16.35 sq mi)

Population (2023)
  - Total: 430
  - Density: 10/km^{2} (26/sq mi)
- Time zone: UTC+1 (CET)
  - Summer (DST): UTC+2 (CEST)
- Postal code: 12179
- Website: tirig.es

Tírig (Valencian: [ˈt(i)ɾitʃ]; Spanish: [ˈtiɾitʃ]) is a municipality in the comarca of Alt Maestrat, Castellón, Valencia, Spain.
