= Atzeneta del Maestrat =

Atzeneta del Maestrat Atzeneta
- Municipality
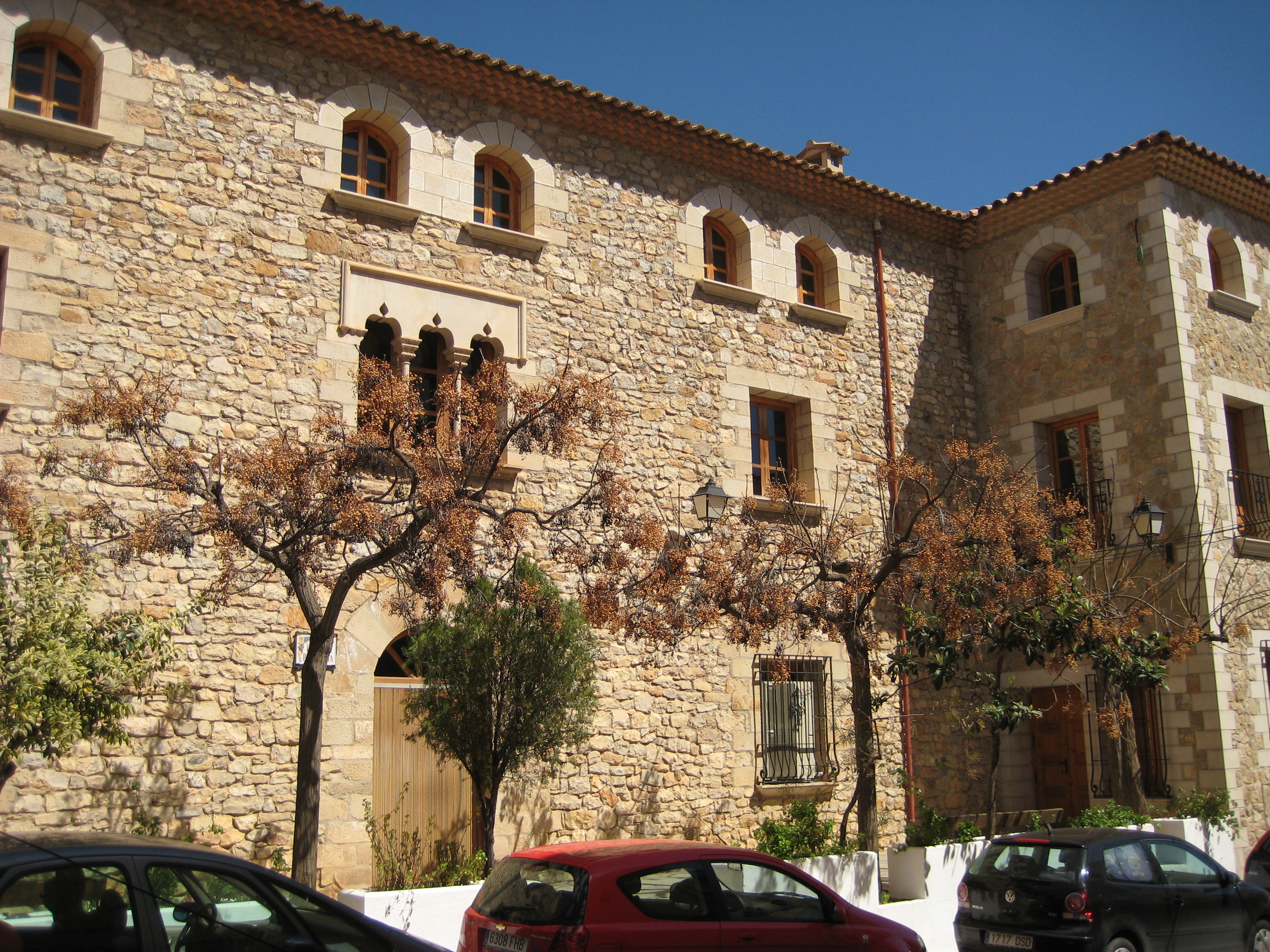
- Town hall

- Flag Coat of arms

- Location in Spain
- Coordinates: 40°12′59″N 0°10′14″W
- Country: Spain
- Autonomous community: Valencian Community
- Province: Castellón
- Comarca: Alt Maestrat
- Judicial district: Castelló de la Plana

Area
  - Total: 71.2 km^{2} (27.5 sq mi)
- Elevation: 402 m (1,319 ft)

Population (2025-01-01)
  - Total: 1,284
  - Density: 18.0/km^{2} (46.7/sq mi)
- Demonym(s): Atzenetí, Atzenetina
- Time zone: UTC+1 (CET)
  - Summer (DST): UTC+2 (CEST)
- Postal code: 12132
- Official language(s): Valencian
- Website: http://www.atzenetadelmaestrat.es

Atzeneta del Maestrat or Adzaneta is a municipality in the comarca of Alt Maestrat, Castelló, Valencian Community.

== See also ==
- List of municipalities in Castellón
