= Ares del Maestrat =

Municipality in the Valencian Community, Spain

Ares del Maestrat Ares del Maestre
- Municipality
- Ares del Maestrat
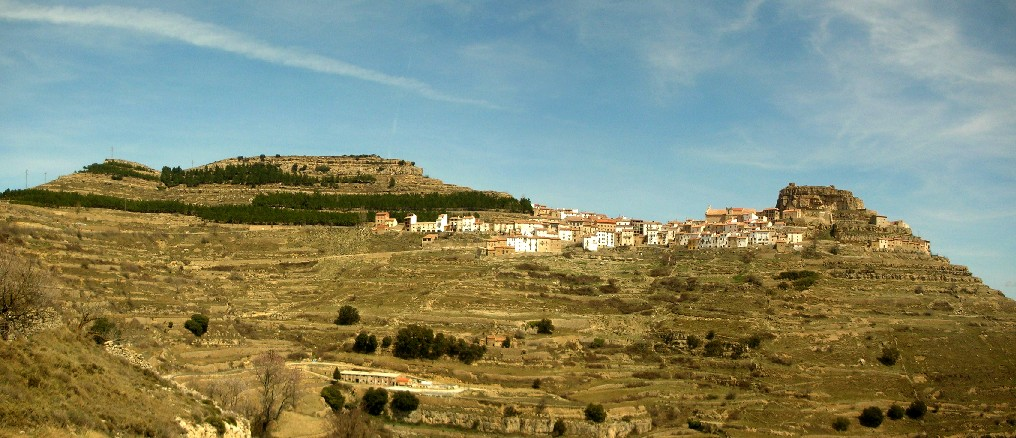
- Ares on top of the Mola d'Ares

- Location in the Valencian Community
- Coordinates: 40°27′N 0°08′W
- Country: Spain
- Autonomous community: Valencian Community
- Province: Castelló
- Elevation: 1,148 m (3,766 ft)

Ares del Maestrat's coat of arms

Ares del Maestrat, also known as Ares del Maestre in Spanish or simply Ares, is a municipality in the province of Castelló in the Valencian Country. It is situated near the top of the Mola d'Ares mountain, at an elevation of 1,148 m.

As a result of migration to the cities in the 1960s and 1970s, Ares del Maestre is sparsely populated today, yet remains a popular tourist destination. Sites of interest include the gothic town hall, neoclassical parish church, and the remains of the Mola castle.

The Tossal d'Orenga mountain, popular among paragliders, is located within the Ares del Maestre municipal term.

== Demography ==
Population
1990	1992	1994	1996	1998	2000	2002	2004	2006
370	335	315	281	266	254	246	228	222

== See also ==
- List of municipalities in Castellón
