= Albocàsser =

Albocàsser Albocácer
- Municipality
- Coat of arms

- Location in Spain Albocàsser (Valencian Community) Albocàsser (Spain)
- Coordinates: 40°21′28″N 0°1′25″W
- Country: Spain
- Autonomous community: Valencian Community
- Province: Castelló / Castellón
- Comarca: Alt Maestrat
- Judicial district: Castelló / Castellón de la Plana

Area
  - Total: 82.3 km^{2} (31.8 sq mi)
- Elevation: 538 m (1,765 ft)

Population (2025-01-01)
  - Total: 1,370
  - Density: 16.6/km^{2} (43.1/sq mi)
- Demonyms: Bocassí, bocassina
- Time zone: UTC+1 (CET)
  - Summer (DST): UTC+2 (CEST)
- Postal code: 12140
- Official language(s): Valencian
- Climate: Csa

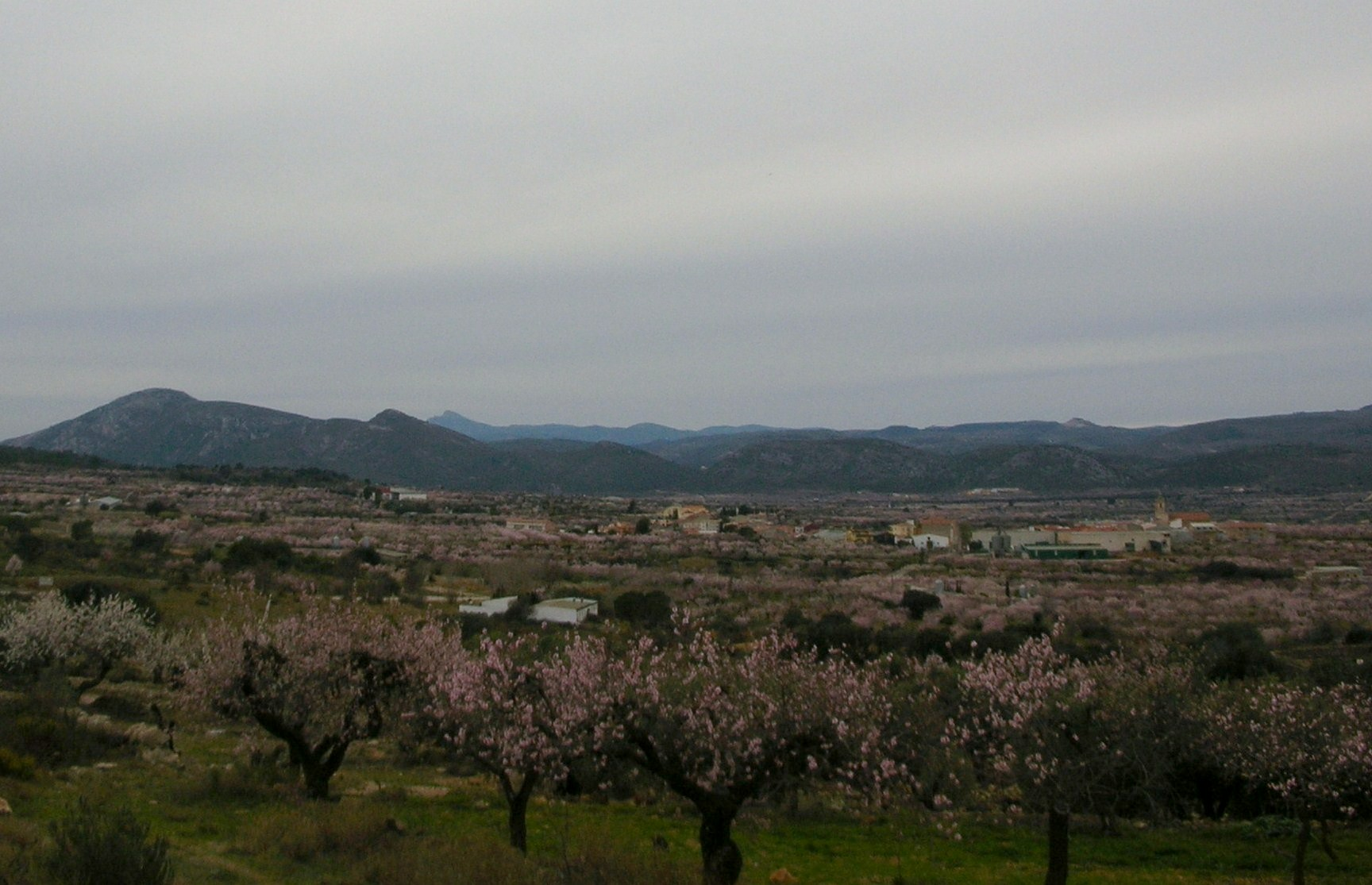
Eastern end of the Serra d'Esparreguera, near Albocàsser

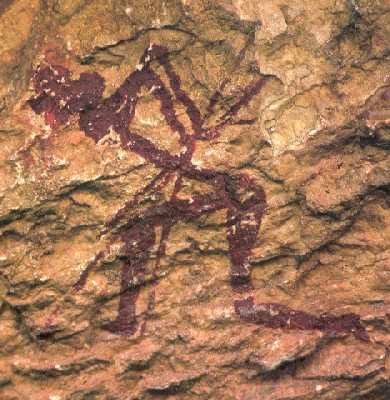
Cave painting.

Albocàsser (Valencian: [alboˈkaseɾ]; Spanish: Albocácer [alβoˈkaθeɾ]) is a municipality in Castellón, Valencia, Spain.

It is located in the comarca of Alt Maestrat and has a population of 1439 inhabitants. The area is mountainous and very picturesque, especially during the almond and cherry tree blooming season.

Albocàsser is surrounded by mountain ranges; the Serra d'En Galceran is located SW of the town and the Montegordo to the north.

== See also ==
- List of municipalities in Castellón
