= Alt Maestrat =

Coordinates: 40°21′23″N 0°01′31″E

Alt Maestrat Alto Maestrazgo
- Comarca
- Country: Spain
- Autonomous community: Valencian Community
- Province: Castelló / Castellón
- Capital: Albocàsser
- Municipalities: 12 municipalities: Albocàsser, Ares del Maestrat, Atzeneta del Maestrat, Benafigos, Benassal, Catí, Culla, La Serratella, Tírig, La Torre d'en Besora, Vilar de Canes, Vistabella del Maestrat

Area
  - Total: 845 km^{2} (326 sq mi)

Population (2019)
  - Total: 6,657
  - Density: 7.88/km^{2} (20.4/sq mi)
- Time zone: UTC+1 (CET)
  - Summer (DST): UTC+2 (CEST)
- Most populated municipality: Albocàsser

Alt Maestrat (Valencian: [ˈald maesˈtɾat]; Spanish: Alto Maestrazgo [ˈalto maesˈtɾaθɣo]) is a comarca in the province of Castellón, Valencian Community, Spain.

== Municipalities ==
The comarca of Alt Maestrat is composed of nine municipalities, listed below with their populations at the 2001 and 2011 Censuses, and according to the most recent official estimates (for 1 January 2019):

Name	Population (2001)	Population (2011)	Population (2019)
Albocàsser	1,353	1,385	1,241
Ares del Maestrat	235	212	186
Benassal	1,374	1,223	1,068
Catí	850	829	721
Culla	733	609	495
Tírig	549	519	419
La Torre d'en Besora	190	176	158
Vilar de Canes	183	187	169
Totals	5,467	5,140	4,457

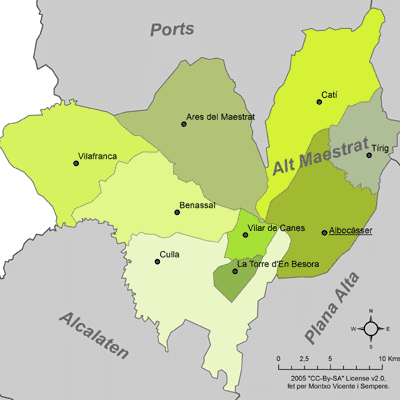
Municipalities of Alt Maestrat (until 2022)
