= Commonwealth of Municipalities of the Vall d'Albaida =

The Commonwealth of Municipalities of the Vall d'Albaida is a mancomunidad of the comarca of the Vall d'Albaida, Spain.

It is composed by the 34 municipalities that make up the comarca with a total population of 90,783 inhabitants, with an extension of 721.60 km² (278.61sq mi).

Its president is Vicent Gomar Moscardó and its vice-president is Josep Antoni Albert i Quilis.

== Function ==
The commonwealth is responsible for promoting and coordinating the proper function of the following activities throughout the Vall d'Albaida:

- Promote cultural activities (Such as the Aplec of Dance of the Vall d'Albaida)
- Ensure the proper function of wastewater treatment facilities
- Provide animal shelters
- Tax management
- Ensure clean roads and waste disposal
- Healthcare
- Social Services
- Tourism

== Municipalities ==
The towns and cities that form the Commonwealth are:

- Atzeneta d'Albaida
- Agullent
- Albaida
- Alfarrasí
- Aielo de Malferit
- Aielo de Rugat
- Bèlgida
- Bellús
- Beniatjar
- Benicolet
- Benigànim
- Benissoda
- Benissuera
- Bocairent
- Bufalí
- Carrícola
- Castelló de Rugat
- Quatretonda
- Fontanars dels Alforins
- Guadasséquies
- Llutxent
- Montaverner
- Montitxelvo
- L'Olleria
- Ontinyent
- Otos
- El Palomar
- Pinet
- La Pobla del Duc
- El Ràfol de Salem
- Rugat
- Salem
- Sempere
- Terrateig
