= Albaida (river) =

River in Spain

Coordinates: 39°05′30″N 0°31′57″W

Río Albaida
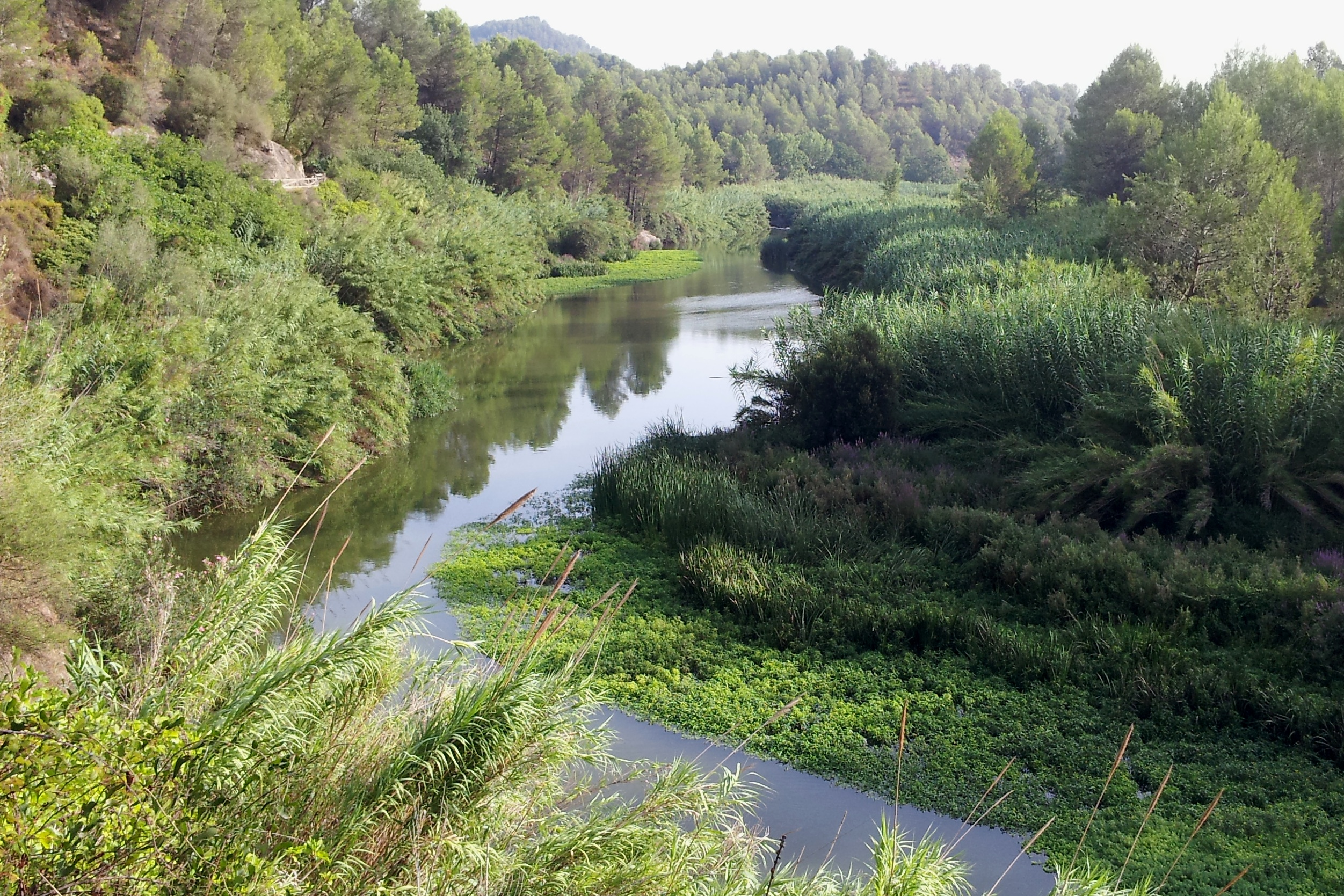
- Albaida River through the Cova Negra Natural Area
- Basin countries: Spain
- Max. length: 47.4 km (29.5 mi)
- Interactive map of Río Albaida

The Albaida River (Spanish: Río Albaida) is a river in the east of the Iberian Peninsula, a tributary of the Júcar River on its right bank, which flows entirely through the province of Valencia, Spain.

== Course ==
It originates on the slopes of the Sierra de Benicadell, in the area known as Font de Fontanars (Fountain of Fontanares), upstream from the city of Albaida, in the port of the same name, towards the south of the province of Valencia.

It crosses the Albaida Valley region from south to north, a region that, in turn, owes its name to this river. Along its course, it passes through the municipalities of: Albaida, Bufali, El Palomar, Alfarrasí, Montaverner, Otos, Benisuera, Sempere, Guadasequies, Bellús, Benigànim, Genovés, Xátiva (and its hamlet of Torre de Lloris), Manuel, Señera, and Villanueva de Castellón, where it flows into the Júcar River. In the municipality of Montaberner, it is joined on its left bank by the Clariano River. From here it runs for about 3 km to the NW, forming the Embalse de Bellús dam and reservoir, built in 1995, and which covers part of the municipal areas of Benisuera, Otos, Sempere, Guadasequies, Bellús and Benigànim.

Its route is curvilinear due to the presence of numerous geographical features that it must overcome (Cueva Negra, Ambastida, el Puig, Alto de Requena, el Cabezo, etc.).

It enters the Costera region crossing the "Sierra Grosa" through the so-called "narrow gorge of the waters" ("estret de les aigües"). At the height of the hamlet of Xátiva called Torre de Llorís is the weir from which the largest irrigation canal of its entire basin, "la comuna de Énova", derives on its right, irrigating more than 2600 hectares in the municipalities of Manuel, Énova, Rafelguaraf, Puebla Larga, San Juan de Énova, Señera and Villanueva de Castellón.

At the "les Foies velles" or "dels frares" section, the Río Cáñoles joins it from the left bank . The river continues and passes into the Ribera Alta plain, near the town of Senyera, where it flows into the Júcar River between Alberic and Villanueva de Castellón, in a place called 'la gola' or 'el trencall' (opposite the old village of Alcocer, now disappeared).

It has a length of 47 km and its main tributaries are the Río Clariano and the Río Cáñoles.
