= La Pobla del Duc =

- Municipality
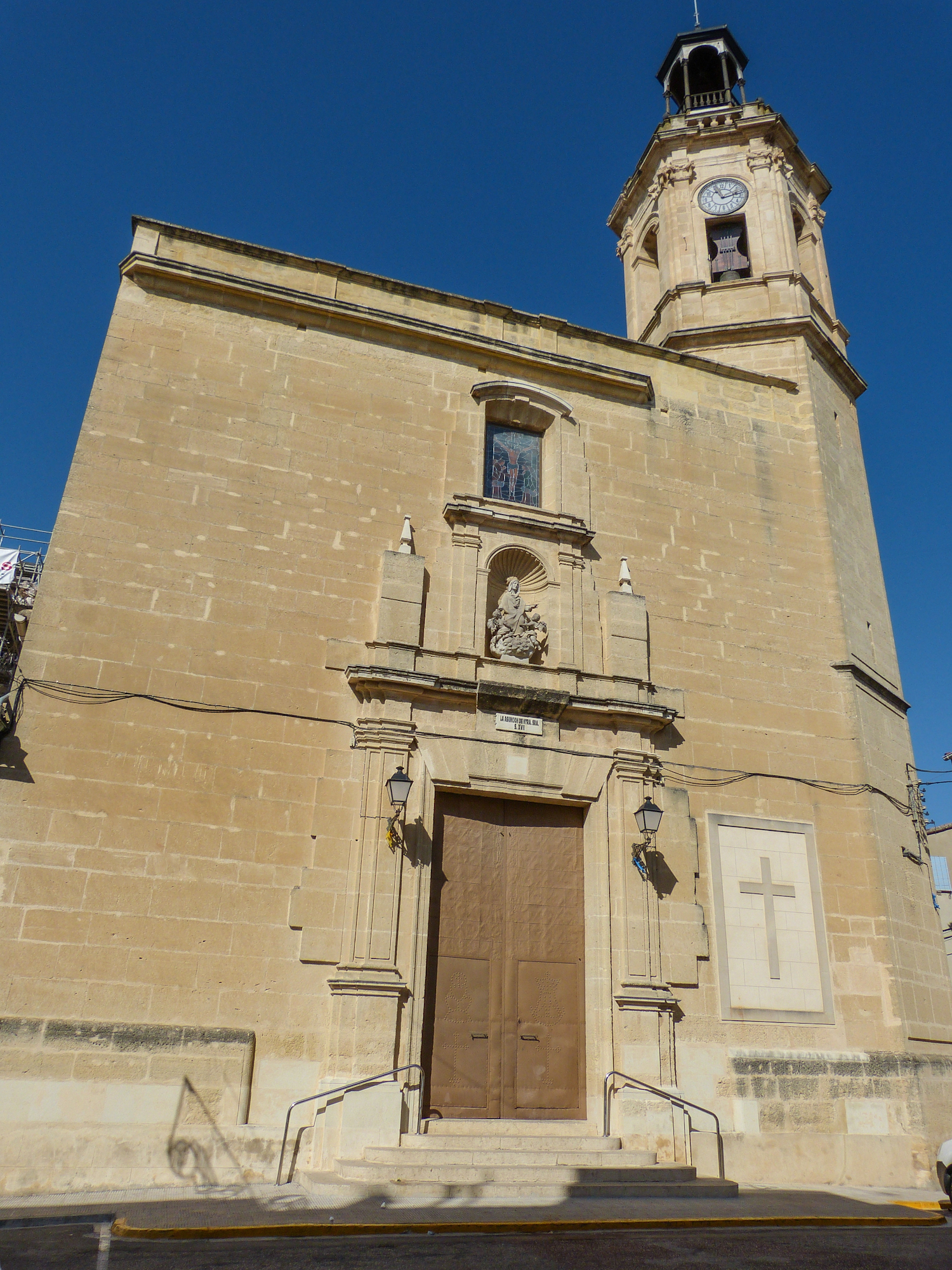
- The parish church of the Ascension

- Flag Coat of arms

- Location in Spain
- Coordinates: 38°54′12″N 0°25′2″W
- Country: Spain
- Autonomous community: Valencian Community
- Province: Valencia
- Comarca: Vall d'Albaida
- Judicial district: Ontinyent

Government
  - Alcalde: Vicent Gomar

Area
  - Total: 18.9 km^{2} (7.3 sq mi)
- Elevation: 243 m (797 ft)

Population (2025-01-01)
  - Total: 2,451
  - Density: 130/km^{2} (336/sq mi)
- Demonym(s): Poblà, poblana
- Time zone: UTC+1 (CET)
  - Summer (DST): UTC+2 (CEST)
- Postal code: 46840
- Official language(s): Valencian
- Website: Official website

La Pobla del Duc (Valencian pronunciation: [la ˈpɔbla ðel ˈduk]) is a municipality in the comarca of Vall d'Albaida in Valencia, Spain.

== Geography ==
It is situated on the right bank of the Albaida river basin. The climate is mediterranean.

From Valencia you can access this town through to the A-7 to link with the CV-40 and the CV-60 to finish in the CV-611. By rail you can get there Renfe Media Distancia line 47, also known as the Valencia-Xàtiva-Alcoy line.

=== Neighbouring localities ===
The municipality of Puebla del Duc is bordered by the following towns: Bèlgida, Beniatjar, Benigànim, Castelló de Rugat, Quatretonda, Llutxent, Otos and Sempere, all of them in the province of Valencia.

== History ==
It is known that in this place existed farmhouses founded and inhabited by the Muslims and that after the conquest of King Jaime I of Aragon in the middle of the thirteenth century, this king granted a new foundation, delivering it to mister Belvis, feudal lord who at that time managed these lands, the so-called Carta Puebla, for the foundation of a new urban nucleus recognized by the Kingdom of Valencia. Later, this lordship gave this possession to the Dukes of Gandía, more specifically to the dukes of the House of Borja, hence its current name.

== Economy ==
Until a few years ago the vine was the main and almost the only economic support of this population. But with the time and the demands of the market today much of the soil is dedicated to summer fruit trees, such as plum, peach and apricot trees. There are several poultry and pig farms, while some 200 sheep are grazing in the wild.

The industrial sector has seen broad growth in recent years, but it is still less important than agri-food activities.

== Monuments ==
- Manor houses. There are still a large number of manor houses in the town, which, although Spartan in their finishes, do not lose their Mediterranean charm.
- Parish church. Dedicated to Nuestra señora de la Asunción, with rectangular plan and hexagonal base tower.
- Calvary Garden. Interesting to see at it.
- The Poasa. Ancient well, from which the first inhabitants started to be settled in the area.
- Convent of Minimus. Founded in 1603, based on the hermitage of San Sebastian and San Fabián, located on the outskirts of the town. After the ecclesiastical disentailment and the exclaustration decreed by Mendizábal in 1835, the building was ceded to the town hall, who demolished it. The original church of the convent is dedicated to San Cosme and San Damián and there are hardly any arches of the gates, which have been integrated into a small park-garden.

== Local Feasts ==
- Patronal feasts. It celebrates its festivities in September in honor of the Christ of the Amparo, San Blas and the Divine Dawn.
- Civic feasts. In recent years, the population has been developing new leisure activities for the enjoyment of adults and children, such as the Food and Commercial Fair of Puebla del Duc: "Bon profit i bona gana".

== See also ==
- List of municipalities in Valencia
