= Amanci Amorós Sirvent =

Spanish composer

Amanci Amorós Sirvent (1854–1925) was a Valencian composer and musician born in Agullent, Spain. His compositions include choral works, religious hymns, and zarzuelas, among them "End of the Seven Words" (1897) and the "Hymn to Santa Cecilia."

He contributed to the development of music theory in Spain.

== Early life and education ==
Amorós was born in 1854 in Agullent, a small town in Valencia, Spain. His family moved to Cocentaina, where his uncle, José Amorós Espí, a priest, arranged for him to receive his first piano and organ lessons.

In 1871, the family relocated to Valencia, where Amorós studied piano under Justo Fuster and harmony under Antoni Marco and Fuster, completing his piano studies in 1876. In 1879–80, he was admitted to the Conservatory of València as a composition student but left after two years. Between 1881 and 1884, he worked as an auxiliary piano teacher at the Conservatory and took part in musical gatherings organized by the society Lo Rat Penat, with which he had been involved since 1882.

== Career ==
Amorós was known for choral works, religious hymns, and instrumental pieces. Notable works include "End of the Seven Words" (1897), which features three voices accompanied by harmonium and piano, and "Hymn to Santa Cecilia," created for choir, harmonium, and piano.

His works were part of a movement to revive local musical traditions that had been suppressed by other European influences.

== Musical style ==
=== Sacred music ===
Notable works include the "Cecilian Mass" (1914), as well as the "Mass in D minor" (1882). His religious works were often performed in the Capilla de Las Adoratrices in Valencia.

Amorós's work has been the subject of research, including a thesis presented by Elena Micó Terol at the Universitat de Barcelona that examines his influence and contributions to Valencian music.
