= Vall d'Albaida =

Vall d'Albaida Valle de Albaida
- Comarca
- Location of Vall d'Albaida in the Valencian Community
- Coordinates: 38°50′30.64″N 0°32′52.59″W
- Country: Spain
- Autonomous community: Valencian Community
- Province: València / Valencia
- Capital and largest city: Ontinyent
- Municipalities: 34 municipalities: Agullent, Aielo de Malferit, Aielo de Rugat, Albaida, Alfarrasí, Atzeneta d'Albaida, Bèlgida, Bellús, Beniatjar, Benicolet, Benigànim, Benissoda, Benissuera, Bocairent, Bufalí, Carrícola, Castelló de Rugat, Fontanars dels Alforins, Guadasséquies, Llutxent, Montaverner, Montitxelvo, L'Olleria, Ontinyent, Otos, El Palomar, Pinet, La Pobla del Duc, Quatretonda, El Ràfol de Salem, Rugat, Salem, Sempere, Terrateig

Area
  - Total: 722.22 km^{2} (278.85 sq mi)

Population (2006)
  - Total: 89,798
  - Density: 124.34/km^{2} (322.03/sq mi)
- Time zone: UTC+1 (CET)
  - Summer (DST): UTC+2 (CEST)

Vall d'Albaida (Valencian: [ˈvaʎ dalˈbajða]; Spanish: Valle de Albaida [ˈbaʎe ðe alˈβajða]) is a comarca in the province of Valencia, Valencian Community, Spain.

== Etymology ==
The name of the comarca is derived from the Hispano-Arabic word albáyḍa, which in turn is derived from the classical Arabic البيضاء (al-bayḍāʾ, "The white one" – reference to the white chalk land of the comarca), from which the yellow flowering plant native to the comarca gets its common name Anthyllis cystoides.

== History ==
Reconquered by the Aragonese king James I of Aragon in the first half of the 13th century it was heavily populated by Muslims until the Expulsion of the Moriscos from the Kingdom of Valencia in 1609.

== Geography ==
Lying approximately 70 km south of the city of Valencia and covering an area of some 722 square kilometers, Vall d'Albaida borders on the north with the comarca of Costera, to the east with Safor, to the south with Comtat and Alcoià, and to the west with Alto Vinalopó, the latter three of which belong to the province of Alicante.

The Albaida River runs through the comarca from south to north.

== Climate ==
The area enjoys a typically Mediterranean climate, characterised by hot summers and relatively cold winters, with an average of two snowfalls per year.

== Municipalities ==
Municipalities of Vall d'Albaida

The Vall d'Albaida comarca is composed of 34 municipalities.

Municipality	Town/Village	Area	Density
Ontinyent	36,395	125.43	290.00
L'Olleria	8,800	32.20	251.73
Albaida	6,269	35.40	177.09
Benigànim	6,700	33.40	184.13
Aielo de Malferit	4,743	27.10	167.23
Bocairent	4,444	97.00	45.81
Llutxent	2,571	40.10	64.11
La Pobla del Duc	2,561	18.90	135.50
Quatretonda	2,513	43.20	58.17
Castelló de Rugat	2,391	19.10	125.18
Atzeneta d'Albaida	1,364	16.20	145.92
Montaverner	1,833	7.40	247.70
Alfarrasí	1,297	6.40	202.65
Agullent	2,435	6.10	210.65
Fontanars dels Alforins	1,014	74.70	13.57
Bèlgida	701	17.30	40.52
Montitxelvo	626	8.20	76.34
Benicolet	577	11.30	51.06
El Palomar	555	7.80	71.15
Otos	520	11.10	46.84
Salem	482	8.60	56.04
Guadasséquies	430	3.30	130.30
El Ràfol de Salem	421	4.30	97.90
Bellús	387	9.50	40.73
Benissoda	361	4.00	90.00
Terrateig	343	6.30	54.44
Beniatjar	260	11.40	22.80
Bufali	203	3.20	63.43
Benissuera	199	1.90	104.73
Aielo de Rugat	197	7.80	25.25
Pinet	190	11.90	15.96
Rugat	174	3.10	56.12
Carrícola	94	4.60	20.43
Sempere	38	3.80	10.00

== Culture ==
=== Route of the Monasteries of Valencia ===
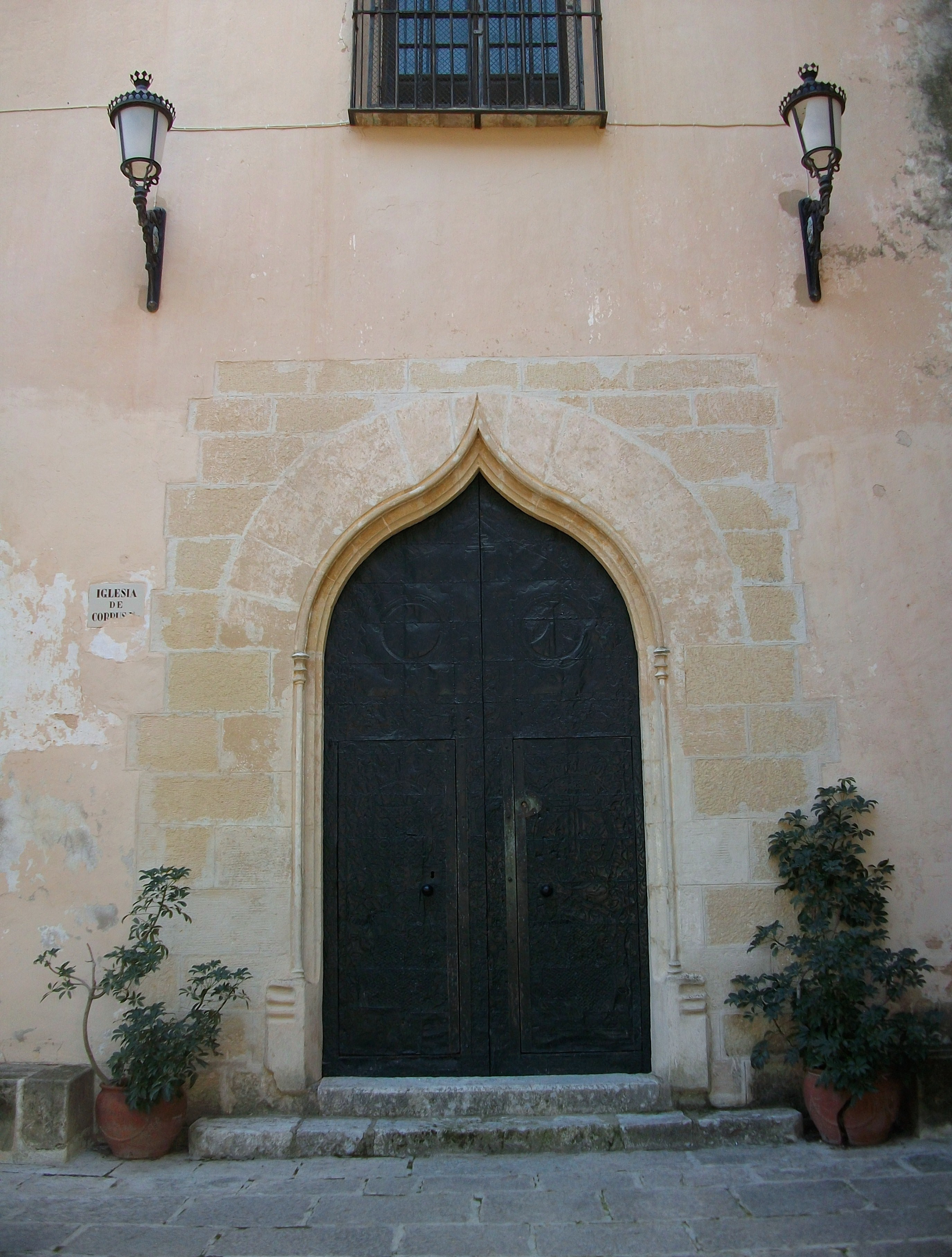
Door of the basilica of the Monastery of the Corpus Christi in Lluxtent

The Route of the Monasteries of Valencia (GR-236) is a monumental and cultural route that connects five monasteries located in the south of the Province of Valencia.

Of the four different itineraries available, three (by foot, by Mountain bike and on horseback) cross various comarques within Vall d'Albaida, following signposted riding trails, mountain trails, old roads and railroad tracks, and include the Monastery of the Corpus Christi and Xio Castle, both in the municipality of Llutxent.

By foot, the route takes approximately 3–4 days.

The Route was inaugurated in 2008.

== See also ==
- Comarques of the Valencian Community
- Commonwealth of Municipalities of the Vall d'Albaida
