= Salem, Spain =

Salem
- Municipality
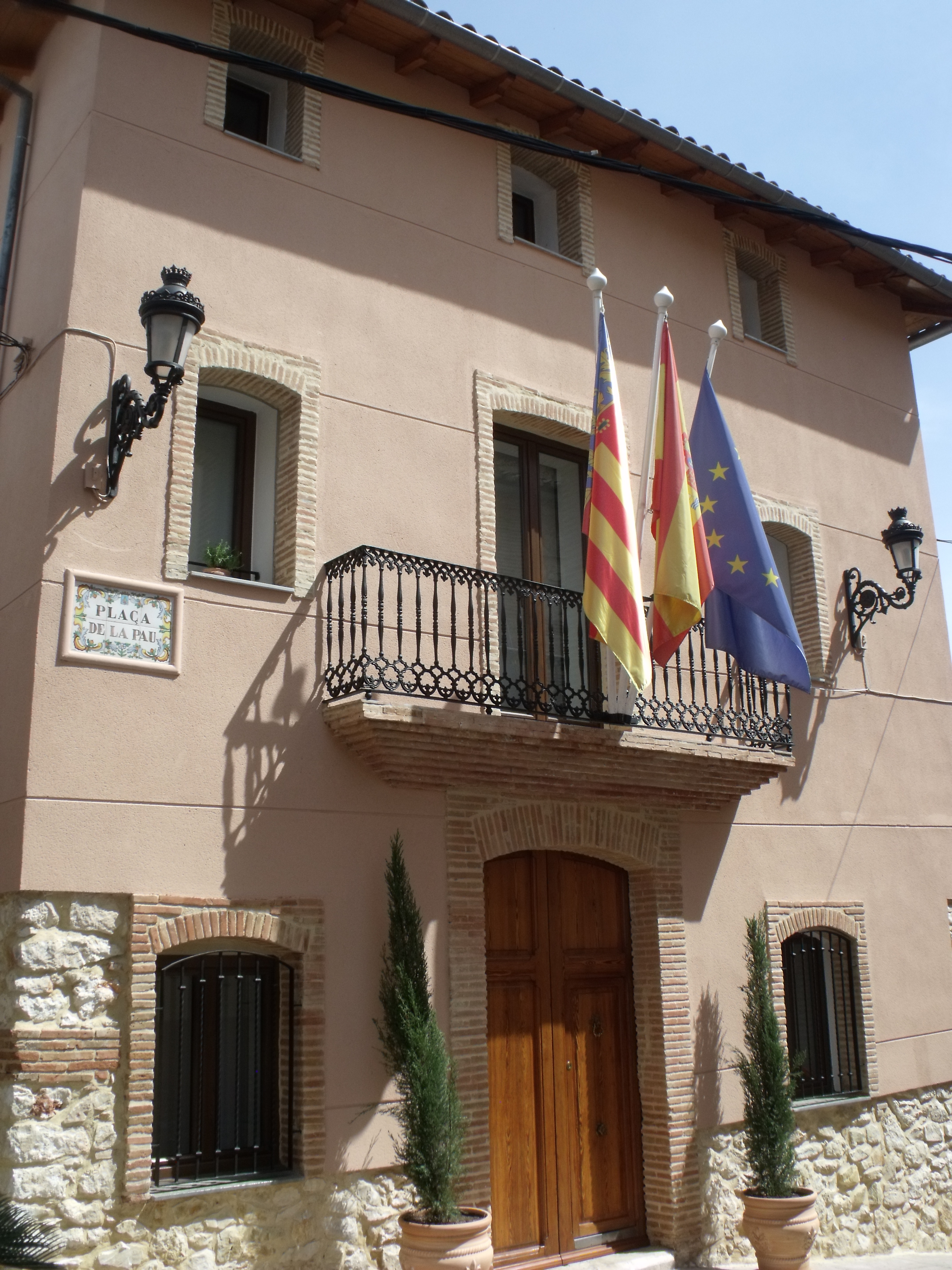
- The municipal council of Salem

- Coat of arms

- Location in Spain Salem (Valencian Community) Salem (Spain)
- Coordinates: 38°51′18″N 0°22′52″W
- Country: Spain
- Autonomous community: Valencian Community
- Province: Valencia
- Comarca: Vall d'Albaida
- Judicial district: Ontinyent

Government
  - Alcalde: Juli Fenollar Banyuls

Area
  - Total: 8.6 km^{2} (3.3 sq mi)
- Elevation: 350 m (1,150 ft)

Population (2025-01-01)
  - Total: 407
  - Density: 47/km^{2} (120/sq mi)
- Demonym(s): Salemer, salemera
- Time zone: UTC+1 (CET)
  - Summer (DST): UTC+2 (CEST)
- Postal code: 46843
- Official language(s): Valencian
- Website: Official website

Salem (Valencian pronunciation: [saˈlem]) is a municipality in the comarca of Vall d'Albaida in the Valencian Community, Spain.

== See also ==
- List of municipalities in Valencia
