= Atzeneta d'Albaida =

- Municipality
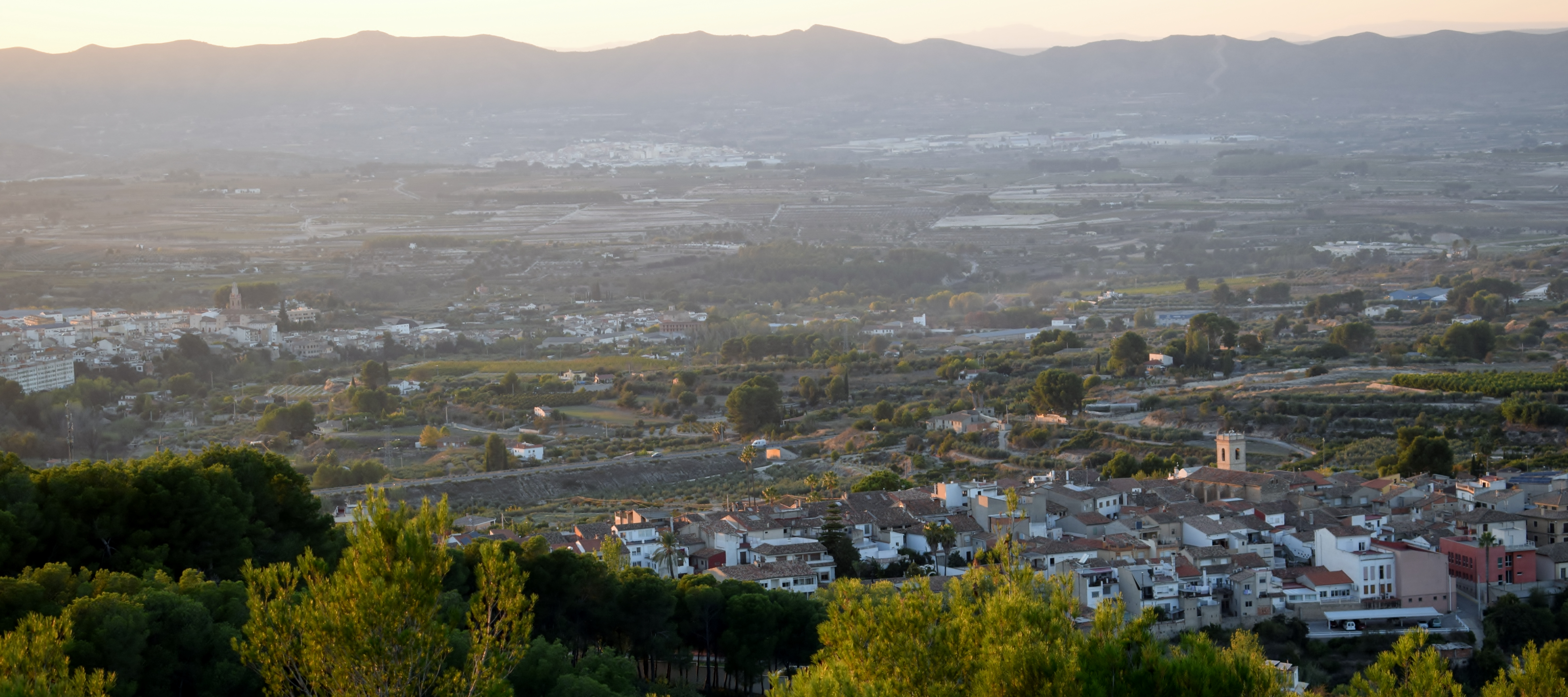

- Coat of arms

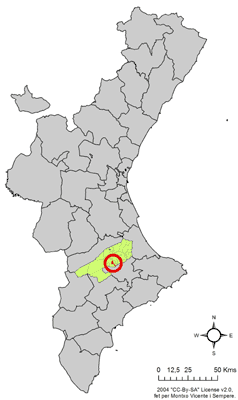

- Location in Spain
- Coordinates: 38°50′11″N 0°29′46″W
- Country: Spain
- Autonomous community: Valencian Community
- Province: Valencia
- Comarca: Vall d'Albaida
- Judicial district: Ontinyent

Government
  - Alcalde: José Hermenegildo Descals Guerrero (2007) (PSOE)

Area
  - Total: 6.10 km^{2} (2.36 sq mi)
- Elevation: 450 m (1,480 ft)

Population (2025-01-01)
  - Total: 1,193
  - Density: 196/km^{2} (507/sq mi)
- Demonym(s): Atzenetí, atzenetina
- Time zone: UTC+1 (CET)
  - Summer (DST): UTC+2 (CEST)
- Postal code: 46869
- Official language(s): Valencian
- Website: Official website

Atzeneta d'Albaida (Spanish: Adzaneta de Albaida) is a municipality in the comarca of Vall d'Albaida, in the province of Valencia, in the Valencian Community, Spain.

== Sights ==
- Church of Saint John the Baptist
- Hermitage of Cristo del Calvario
- Nevera de Dalt
- Nevera de Baix

== See also ==
- List of municipalities in Valencia
