= Montitxelvo/Montichelvo =

Montitchelvo
- Municipality
- Montitxelvo/Montichelvo
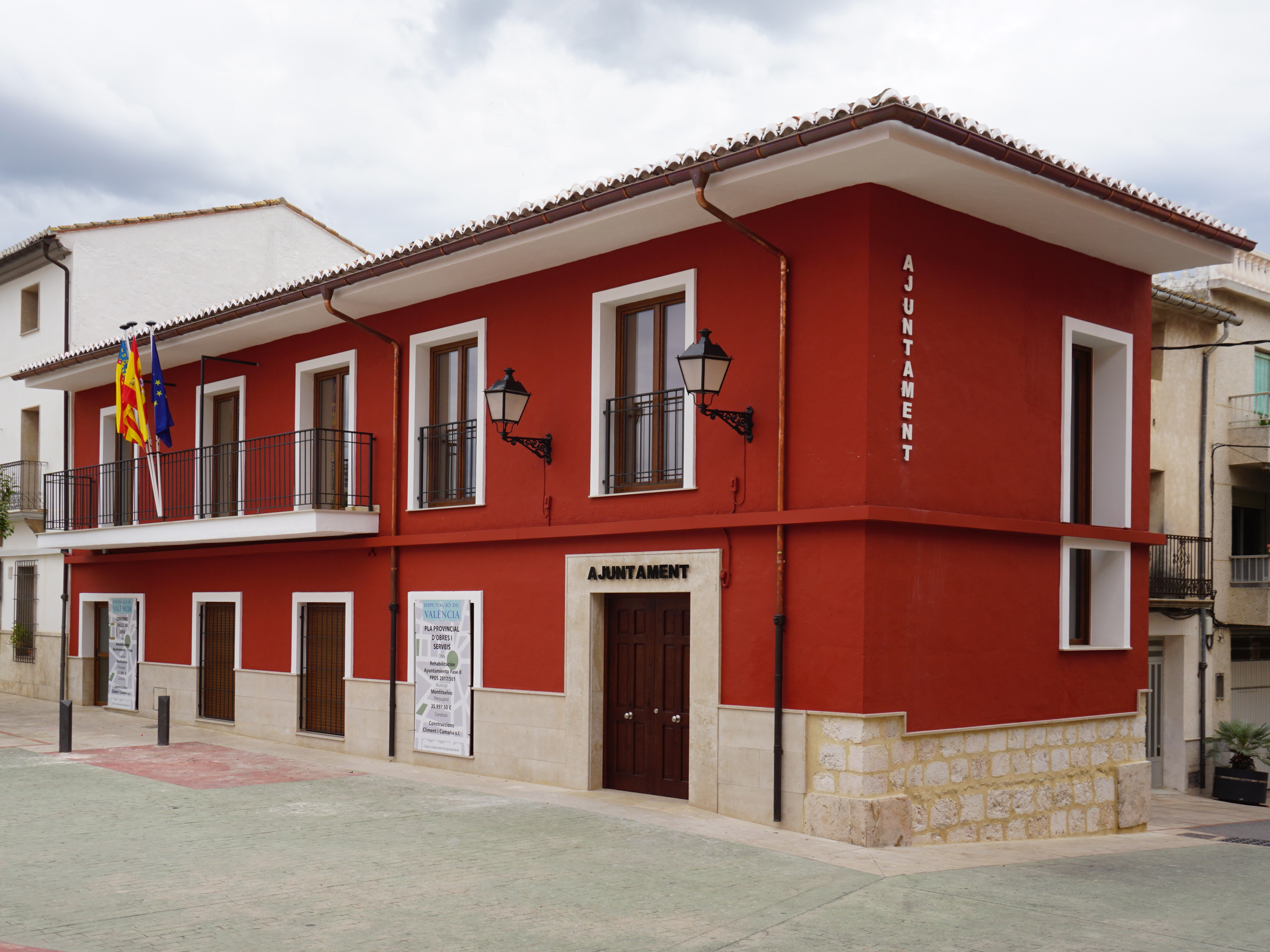
- Town hall

- Coat of arms

- Location in Spain
- Coordinates: 38°53′28″N 0°20′20″W
- Country: Spain
- Autonomous community: Valencian Community
- Province: Valencia
- Comarca: Vall d'Albaida

Government
  - Alcalde: Josep Miquel Climent Orts

Area
  - Total: 8.16 km^{2} (3.15 sq mi)
- Elevation: 270 m (890 ft)

Population (2025-01-01)
  - Total: 556
  - Density: 68.1/km^{2} (176/sq mi)
- Demonym(s): Montitxelví/ina, Montichelvino/a
- Time zone: UTC+1 (CET)
  - Summer (DST): UTC+2 (CEST)
- Postal code: 46842
- Website: Official website

Montitxelvo/Montichelvo officially as Montichelvo (Spanish pronunciation: [montiˈtʃelbo]) (in Spanish) and Montitxelvo (Valencian pronunciation: [montiˈtʃɛlvo]) (in Valencian) is a municipality in the comarca of Vall d'Albaida in the province of Valencia and the Valencian Community, Spain. The municipality spans across a total area of 8.16 km^{2} and, as of 1 January 2022, it has a registered population of 571.

In old sources, the placename is documented as Montichervo. After 1612, the place was ethnic cleansed of moriscos and resettled by Old Christians.

== See also ==
- List of municipalities in Valencia
