= Benicolet =

- Municipality
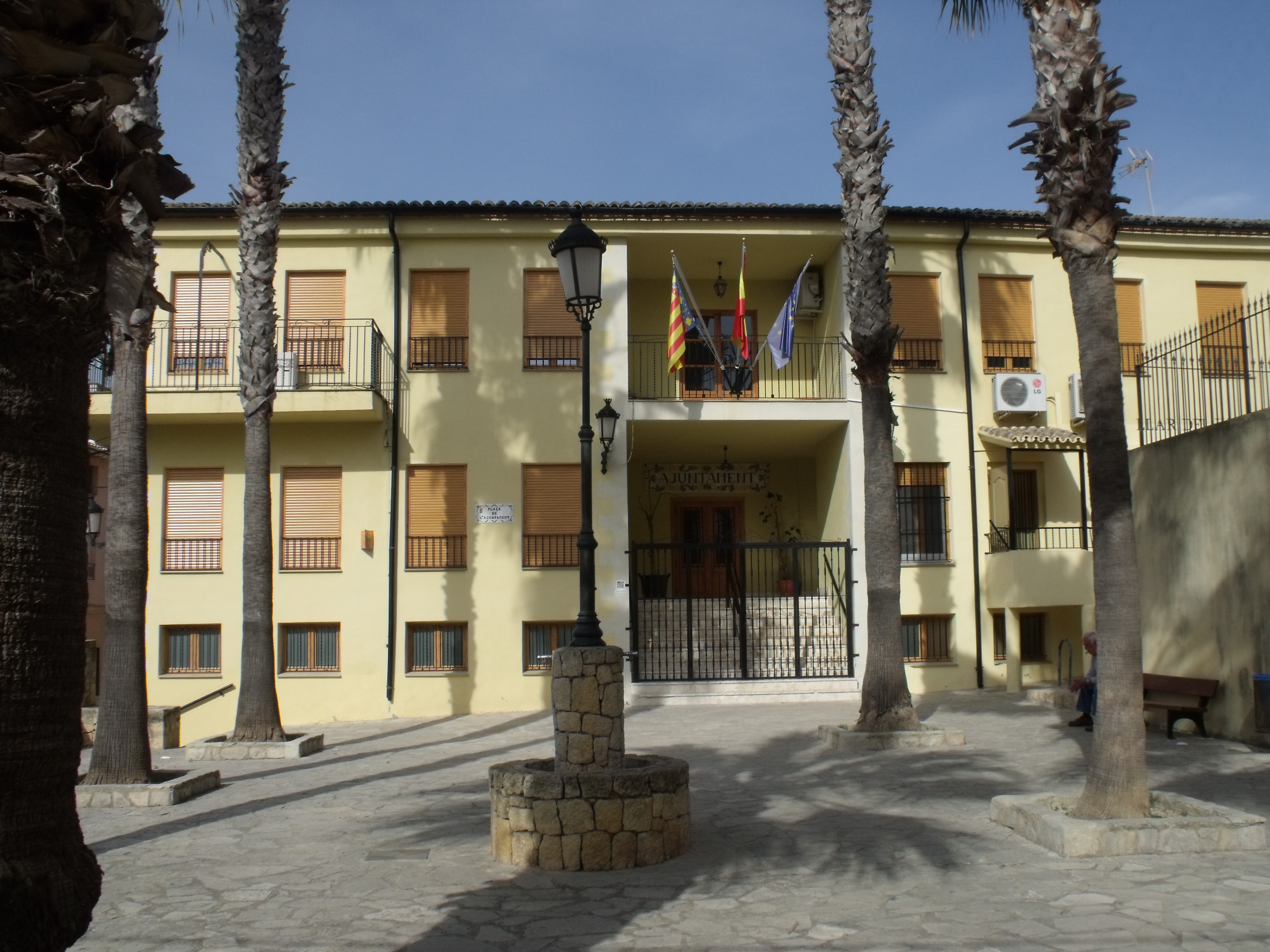
- Town hall

- Coat of arms

- Location in Spain
- Coordinates: 38°55′10″N 0°20′46″W
- Country: Spain
- Autonomous community: Valencian Community
- Province: Valencia
- Judicial district: Ontinyent

Government
  - Alcalde: Antonio Pastor Pérez

Area
  - Total: 11.3 km^{2} (4.4 sq mi)
- Elevation: 241 m (791 ft)

Population (2025-01-01)
  - Total: 610
  - Density: 54/km^{2} (140/sq mi)
- Demonym(s): Benicoletà, benicoletana
- Time zone: UTC+1 (CET)
  - Summer (DST): UTC+2 (CEST)
- Postal code: 46838
- Official language(s): Valencian
- Website: Official website

Benicolet (Valencian: [benikoˈlet]; Spanish: [benikoˈlet]) is a municipality in the comarca of Vall d'Albaida in the Valencian Community, Spain.

== See also ==
- List of municipalities in Valencia
