= Aielo de Malferit =

- Municipality
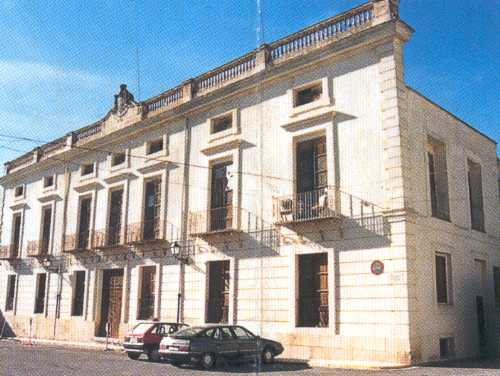

- Flag Coat of arms

- Location in Spain
- Coordinates: 38°52′40″N 0°35′31″W
- Country: Spain
- Autonomous community: Valencian Community
- Province: Valencia
- Comarca: Valle de Albaida
- Judicial district: Ontinyent

Government
  - Alcalde: Jose Luis Juan Pinter (2007) (PP)

Area
  - Total: 27 km^{2} (10 sq mi)
- Elevation: 282 m (925 ft)

Population (2025-01-01)
  - Total: 4,624
  - Density: 170/km^{2} (440/sq mi)
- Demonyms: Aieloner, aielonera
- Time zone: UTC+1 (CET)
  - Summer (DST): UTC+2 (CEST)
- Postal code: 46812
- Official language(s): Valencian
- Website: Official website

Aielo de Malferit is a municipality in the comarca of Vall d'Albaida in the Valencian Community, Spain.

- Ivana Andrés (born 1994), footballer for the Spain national team and for Inter Milan
- Nino Bravo (born 1944), baroque pop and ballad singer

== See also ==
- List of municipalities in Valencia
