= El Ràfol de Salem =

- Municipality
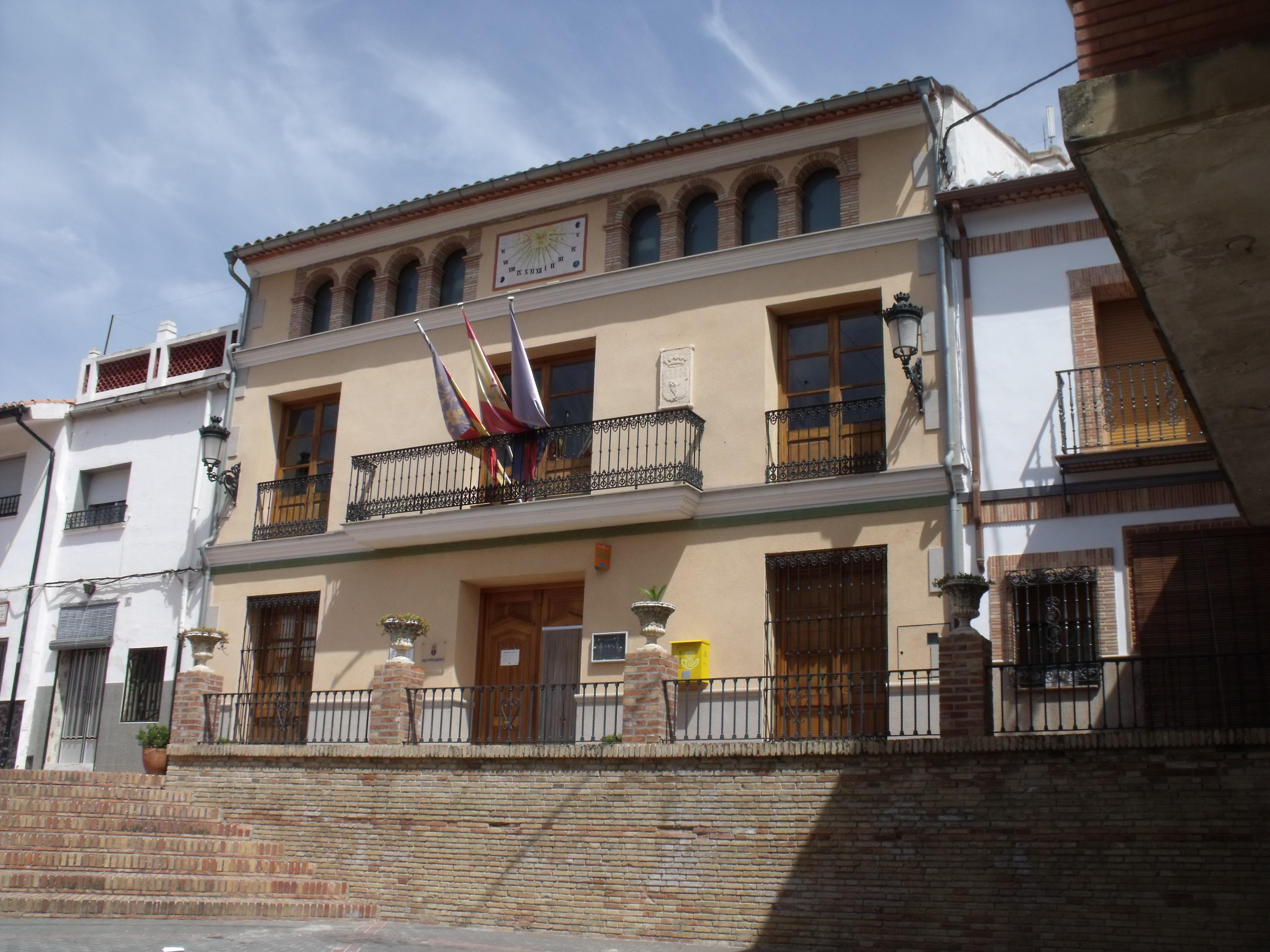
- Town hall

- Coat of arms

- Location in Spain
- Coordinates: 38°51′53″N 0°23′47″W
- Country: Spain
- Autonomous community: Valencian Community
- Province: Valencia
- Comarca: Vall d'Albaida
- Judicial district: Ontinyent

Government
  - Alcalde: José Senabre Guillem

Area
  - Total: 4.30 km^{2} (1.66 sq mi)
- Elevation: 200 m (660 ft)

Population (2025-01-01)
  - Total: 463
  - Density: 108/km^{2} (279/sq mi)
- Demonym(s): Rafolí, rafolina
- Time zone: UTC+1 (CET)
  - Summer (DST): UTC+2 (CEST)
- Postal code: 46843
- Official language(s): Valencian
- Website: Official website

El Ràfol de Salem (Valencian pronunciation: [el ˈrafol de saˈlem]; Spanish: Ráfol de Salem) is a municipality in the comarca of Vall d'Albaida in the Valencian Community, Spain.

The land has been occupied since prehistoric times, as evidenced by the pottery shards found in the Rafol mountains.

== See also ==
- List of municipalities in Valencia
