= Benissoda =

- Municipality
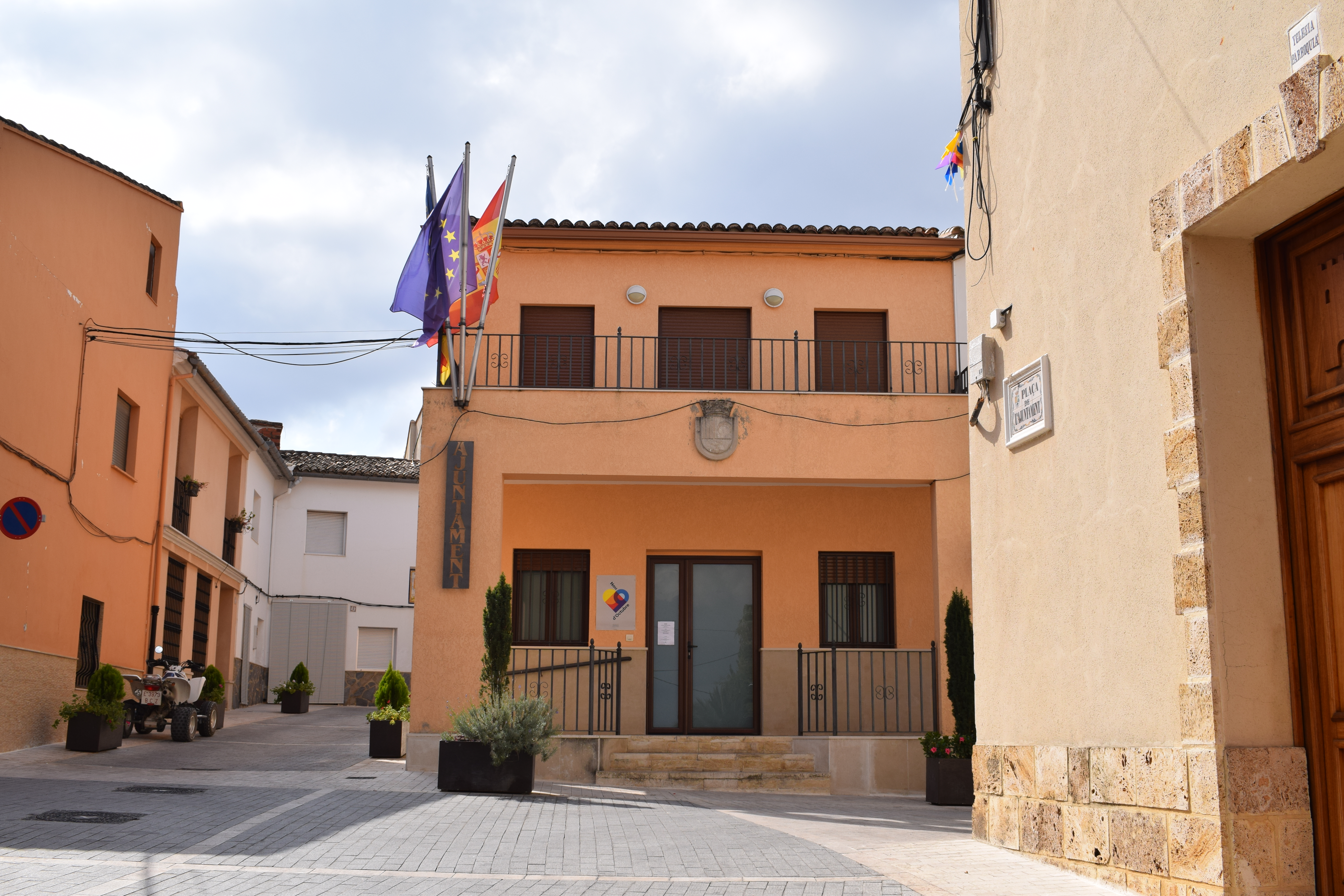
- Town hall

- Coat of arms

- Location in Spain
- Coordinates: 38°49′57″N 0°31′51″W
- Country: Spain
- Autonomous community: Valencian Community
- Province: Valencia
- Comarca: Vall d'Albaida
- Judicial district: Ontinyent

Government
  - Alcalde: Salvador Roig Espí

Area
  - Total: 4 km^{2} (1.5 sq mi)
- Elevation: 319 m (1,047 ft)

Population (2025-01-01)
  - Total: 494
  - Density: 120/km^{2} (320/sq mi)
- Demonym(s): Benissodà, benissodana
- Time zone: UTC+1 (CET)
  - Summer (DST): UTC+2 (CEST)
- Postal code: 46869
- Official language(s): Valencian
- Website: Official website

Benissoda (Spanish: Benisoda) is a municipality in the comarca of Vall d'Albaida in the Valencian Community, Spain.

== See also ==
- List of municipalities in Valencia
