= Rugat =

- Municipality
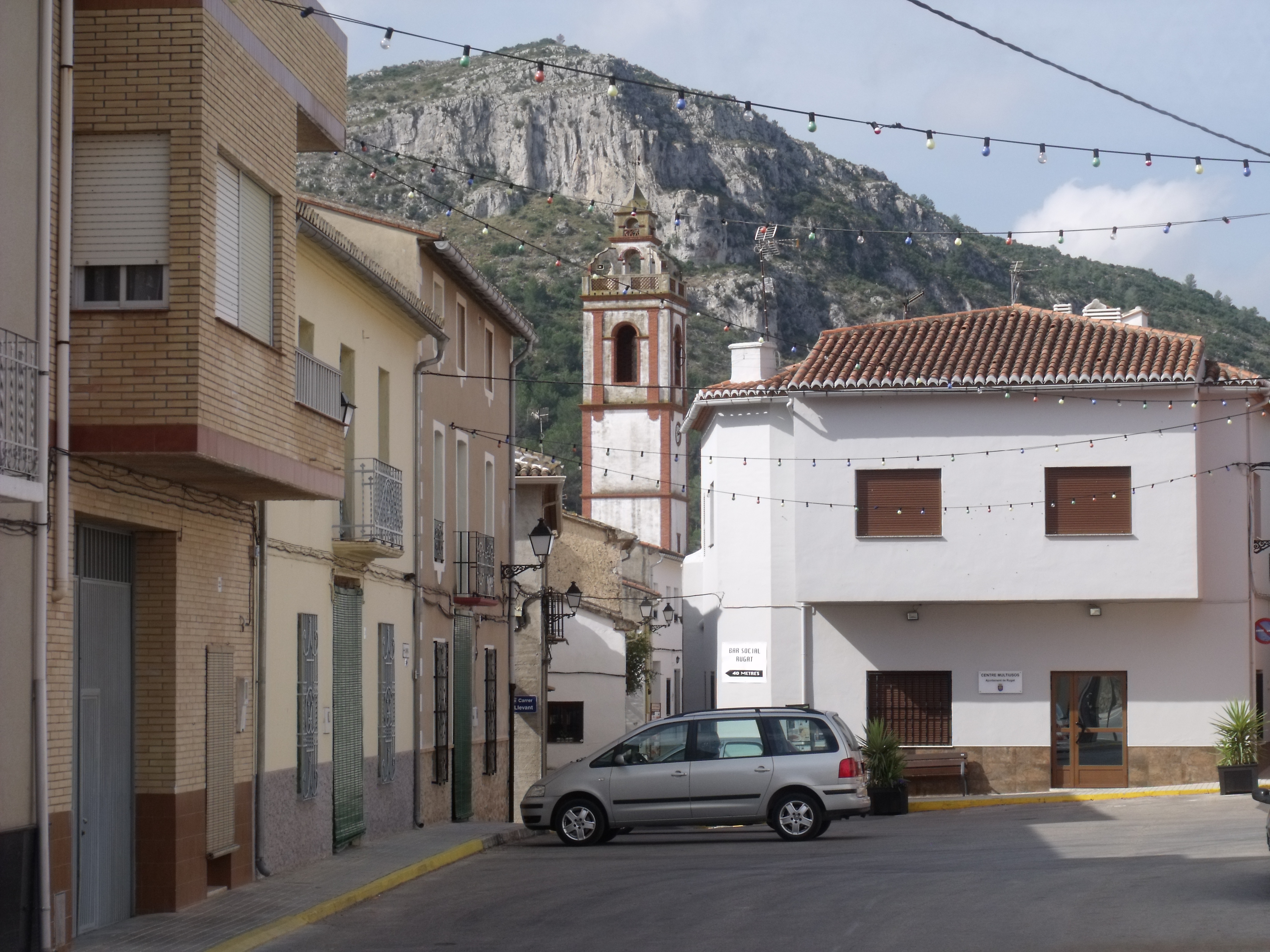
- Houses in Rugat

- Flag Coat of arms

- Location in Spain
- Coordinates: 38°52′48″N 0°21′46″W
- Country: Spain
- Autonomous community: Valencian Community
- Province: Valencia
- Comarca: Vall d'Albaida
- Judicial district: Ontinyent

Government
  - Alcalde: Raúl Martínez Fuster

Area
  - Total: 3.1 km^{2} (1.2 sq mi)
- Elevation: 300 m (980 ft)

Population (2025-01-01)
  - Total: 165
  - Density: 53/km^{2} (140/sq mi)
- Demonym(s): Rugatí, rugatina
- Time zone: UTC+1 (CET)
  - Summer (DST): UTC+2 (CEST)
- Postal code: 46842
- Official language(s): Valencian
- Website: Official website

Rugat is a municipality in the comarca of Vall d'Albaida in the Valencian Community, Spain.

== See also ==
- List of municipalities in Valencia
