= Aielo de Rugat =

- Municipality
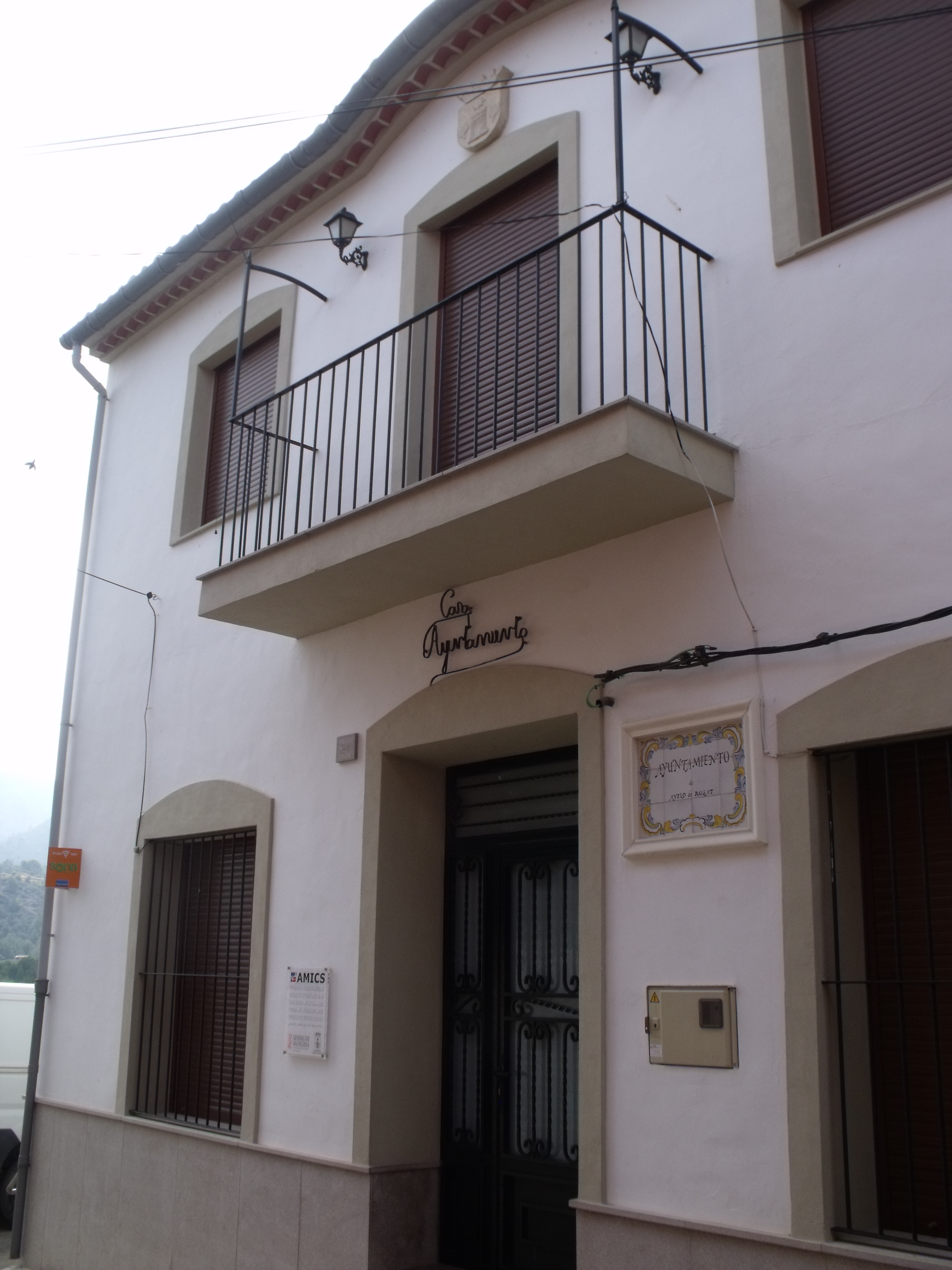
- Town hall

- Flag Coat of arms

- Location in Spain
- Coordinates: 38°52′55″N 0°20′39″W
- Country: Spain
- Autonomous community: Valencian Community
- Province: Valencia
- Comarca: Vall d'Albaida
- Judicial district: Ontinyent

Government
  - Alcalde: Jaime Soler Todolí

Area
  - Total: 7.66 km^{2} (2.96 sq mi)
- Elevation: 267 m (876 ft)

Population (2025-01-01)
  - Total: 160
  - Density: 21/km^{2} (54/sq mi)
- Demonyms: Aielí, aielina
- Time zone: UTC+1 (CET)
  - Summer (DST): UTC+2 (CEST)
- Postal code: 46842
- Official language(s): Valencian
- Website: Official website

Aielo de Rugat is a municipality in the comarca of Vall d'Albaida in the Valencian Community, Spain.

== See also ==
- List of municipalities in Valencia
