= Terrateig =

- Municipality
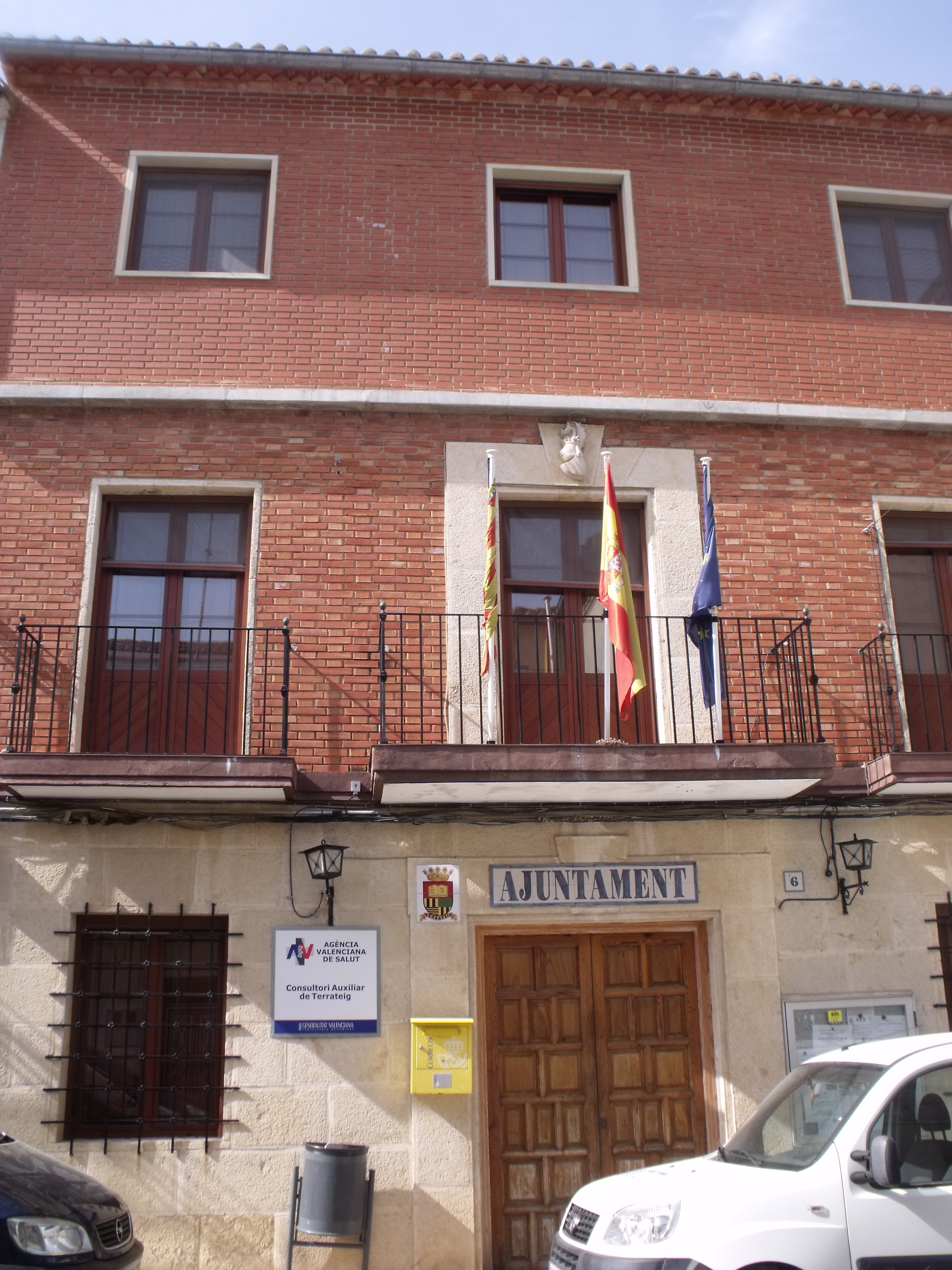
- Town hall

- Coat of arms

- Location in Spain
- Coordinates: 38°53′39″N 0°19′14″W
- Country: Spain
- Autonomous community: Valencian Community
- Province: Valencia
- Comarca: Vall d'Albaida
- Judicial district: Ontinyent

Government
  - Alcalde: Silvia Ferrer Rocher

Area
  - Total: 6.3 km^{2} (2.4 sq mi)
- Elevation: 250 m (820 ft)

Population (2025-01-01)
  - Total: 290
  - Density: 46/km^{2} (120/sq mi)
- Demonym(s): terrategí, -ina (Val.) terrateguino, -a (Sp.)
- Time zone: UTC+1 (CET)
  - Summer (DST): UTC+2 (CEST)
- Postal code: 46842
- Official language(s): Valencian; Spanish
- Website: Official website

Terrateig (Valencian: [teraˈtetʃ]; Spanish: [teraˈtejɣ], also [teraˈtetʃ]) is a municipality in the comarca of Vall d'Albaida in the Valencian Community, Spain.

== Monuments ==
- Hermitage of Sant Vicent Ferrer: One of the Terrateig barons decided to perpetuate the memory of Sant Vicent Ferrer by building this hermitage in 1410. No remains of what was the primitive hermitage have been preserved, the current one was inaugurated in 1883.

== Cuisine ==
In Terrateig, as in the rest of the Central Counties, the cuisine is as varied as the landscape. For centuries, the slopes of the mountains have been terraced and almond, olive, cherry, and fig trees have been planted. On the riverbank and the foothills of the mountains with a lot of work, dams and ditches were built. Aubergines, broad beans, Swiss chard, turnips, artichokes, pumpkins, year-round melons, watermelons were grown in family gardens... And later, in the 15th century, tomatoes, corn and potatoes arrived from overseas. Cereals, vines and fruit trees were cultivated in the rainfed plains. The meat would be provided by the corrals and the sierra. The fish would come in the form of salt from the coast. Sugar was sold by the residents of La Safor, who also sweetened half of Europe.

The origin of the traditional cuisine of Terrateig would have a Mediterranean base influenced by Arab (and Moorish) cuisine and with the potential that the arrival of the Crown of Aragon meant.

The pastry has a strong Arab influence. Very sweet cakes such as arrop i talladetes or les anous i rovells al fondant. Almond cakes, sweet potato cakes, almoixàvenes, celestial coques, gypsy arms, carquinyols (rosegons), coques de llanda, fogasses, etc.

== See also ==
- List of municipalities in Valencia
