= Carrícola =

- Municipality
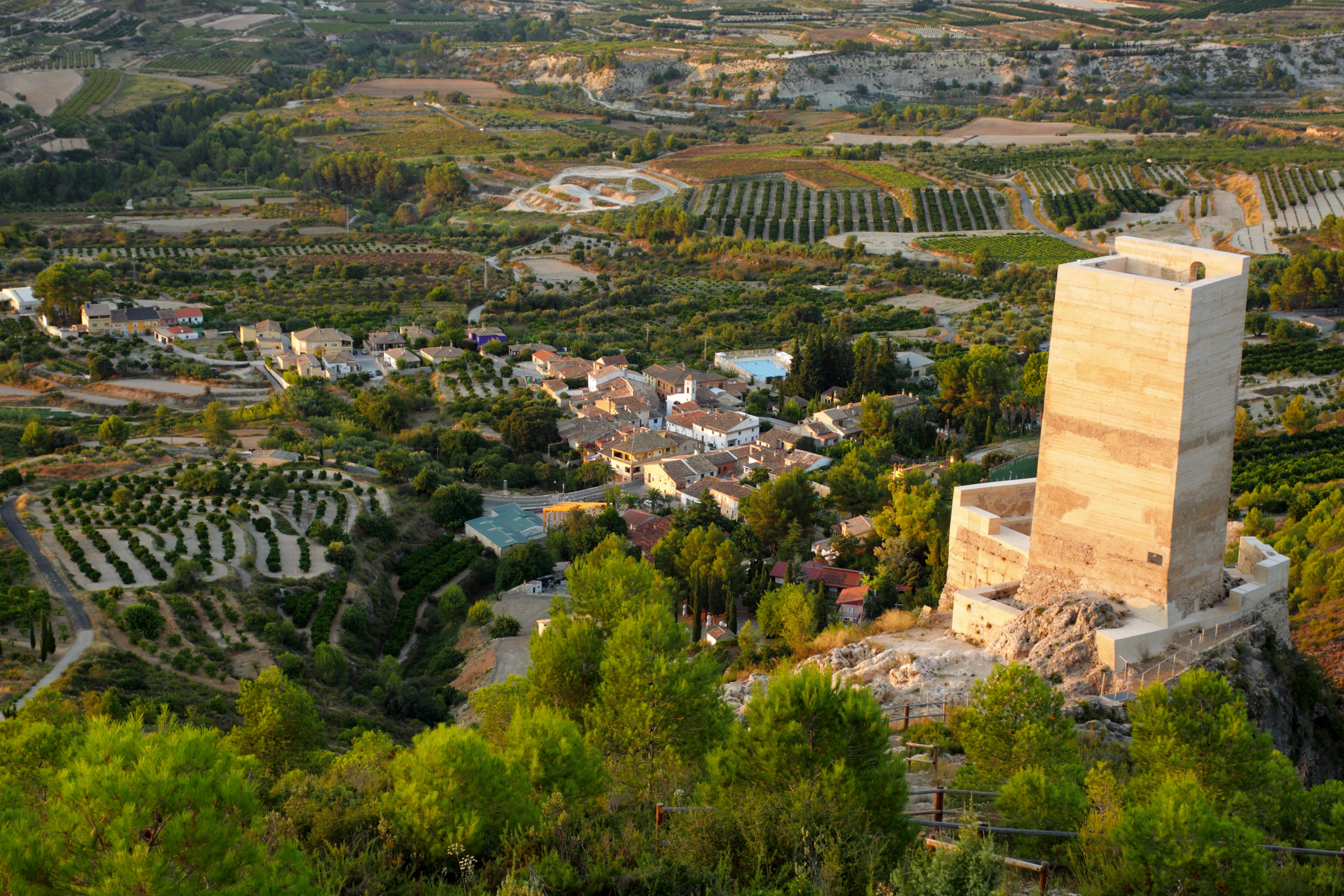

- Coat of arms

- Location in Spain
- Coordinates: 38°50′26″N 0°28′17″W
- Country: Spain
- Autonomous community: Valencian Community
- Province: Valencia
- Comarca: Vall d'Albaida
- Judicial district: Ontinyent

Government
  - Alcalde: Susana Chafer Nacher (PSOE)

Area
  - Total: 4.6 km^{2} (1.8 sq mi)
- Elevation: 425 m (1,394 ft)

Population (2025-01-01)
  - Total: 97
  - Density: 21/km^{2} (55/sq mi)
- Demonym(s): Carricolí, carricolina
- Time zone: UTC+1 (CET)
  - Summer (DST): UTC+2 (CEST)
- Postal code: 46869
- Official language(s): Valencian
- Website: Official website

Carrícola is a municipality in the comarca of Vall d'Albaida in the Valencian Community, Spain.

== See also ==
- List of municipalities in Valencia
