= Castelló de Rugat =

- Municipality
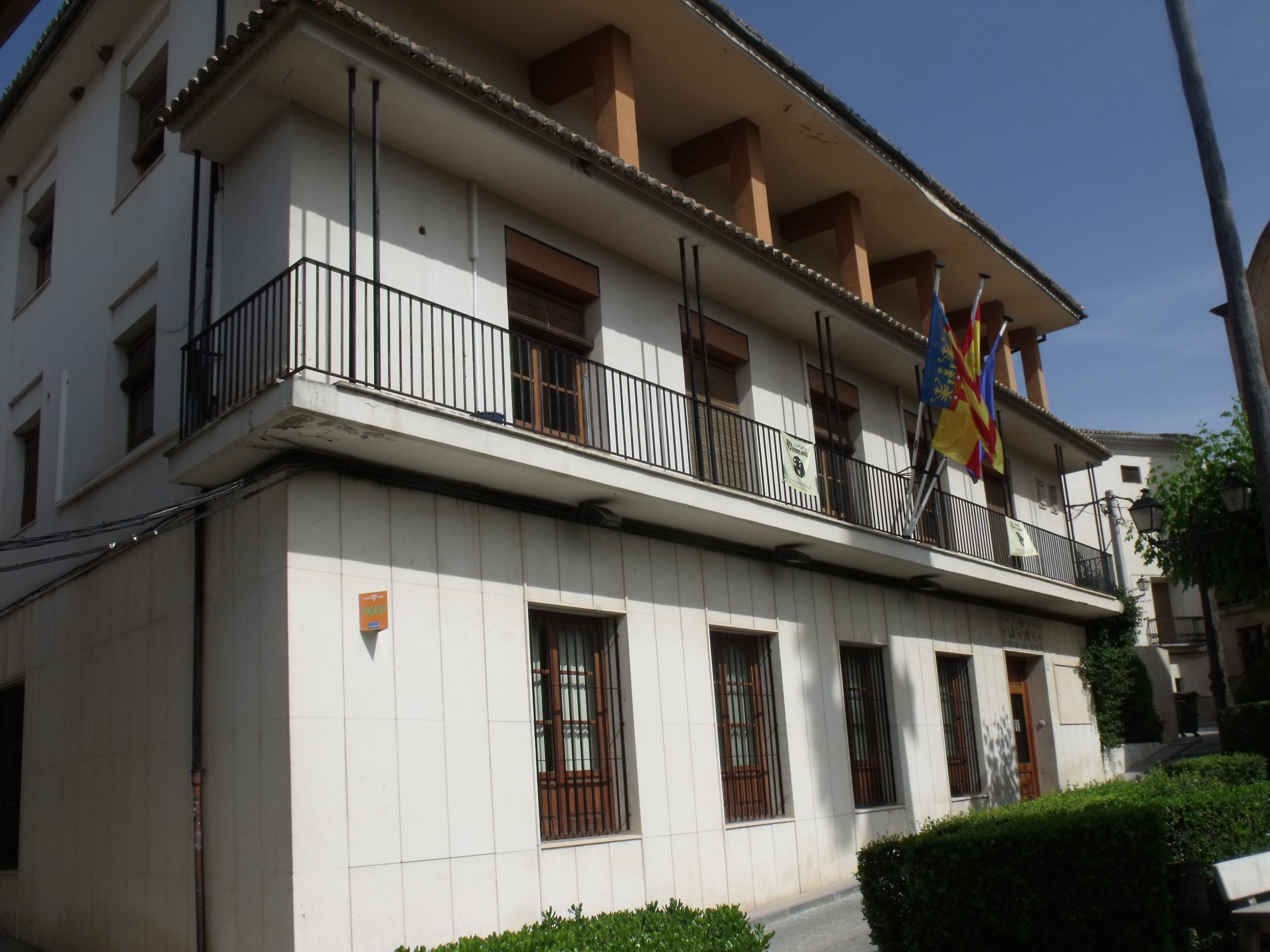
- Town hall

- Coat of arms

- Location in Spain
- Coordinates: 38°52′33″N 0°22′59″W
- Country: Spain
- Autonomous community: Valencian Community
- Province: Valencia
- Comarca: Vall d'Albaida
- Judicial district: Ontinyent

Government
  - Alcalde: Jose Miguel Barranca Alborch (PP)

Area
  - Total: 19.1 km^{2} (7.4 sq mi)
- Elevation: 320 m (1,050 ft)

Population (2025-01-01)
  - Total: 2,345
  - Density: 123/km^{2} (318/sq mi)
- Demonym(s): Castellonenc, castellonenca
- Time zone: UTC+1 (CET)
  - Summer (DST): UTC+2 (CEST)
- Postal code: 46841
- Official language(s): Valencian
- Website: Official website

Castelló de Rugat (Spanish: Castellón de Rugat) is a municipality in the comarca of Vall d'Albaida in the Valencian Community, Spain.

== Geography ==
Located in the east side of the "comarca" at the North of Benicadell Mountains. Its district occupies about 2000 ha. the great majority of which are dedicated to agriculture, the other part are gullies and mountain ranges. The highest hills are La Lloma de l'Ullastre (820 m) Peña Blanca (530 m) Algebasó (503 m), other hills are La Buitrera, El Morqui or L'Ermita. The town is situated at the side of L'Ermita hill over 320m. high. The Benicadell Mountains separate the district from Cocentaina County. At the North, West and East there is the plain with many gullies and ravines.

== Neighboring localities ==
The Castello district borders with next localities: Aielo de Rugat, Beniatjar, Llutxent, Pobla del Duc, El Ràfol de Salem, Rugat and Salem, all of them in the Valencia Province, and L'Orxa in the Alicante Province.

== History ==
The first testimonies of the occupation of the Castelló lands can be found at the Llopis and at La Cerradura caves dated at the Neolithic era. other rests of the same time were also found in many district places like L'Ofra, El Planet, La Loseta Etc. Some testimonies of the Valencian Bronze Age are the villages found at the Buitrera, Algebassó or Peña Blanca. About the Roman era, many sites were found all over the district, even should be distinguished for each quality and quantity the recent find of a Roman villa at the L'Ofra place.

The Spanish Reconquista of this region was carry out by King James I of Aragon, it was no easy because of the important resistance put by the Muslim leader named Al Azraq whose troops even kill some king knights there. When the conquest was managed by the Christians this territories became part of the Rugat Baron properties given to Lord Bellvis till 1499, year in which were bought by the Duke of Gandia who keep a manor there, some parts of it still remain. Since then the town was named Castelló del Duc, the inhabitants were in the great majority moorish (moriscos), because of that in 1609 when King Felipe III sending off the moorish people from Spain, Castelló became underpopulated. Castelló remains in the Duke states till the nobility dominion abolition with the 1812 Cadiz Constitution.

== Economy ==
The local economy has been historically based on agriculture, usually non-irrigated agriculture which was first cereals and vineyard later introducing gradually tree fruit cultivation however Castelló kept an ancient ceramics industry of earthenware jars manufacturers which were so famous in the zone. The progressive decline of the agricultural economy during the last third part of the 20th century turns this activity into a secondary partial one, however still exist there an agricultural cooperative and many fruit stores dedicated to export and trading fruits keeping the sector in a relatively main place.

The number of services which exist in Castellò turn it into a dynamic and attractive place for the other towns in the zone.

It also exist several mixed farming exploitations producing chicken, lamb, pork or eggs. Lately the building sector has become an important part in the Castello economy.

About industry stands out the decorative ceramics one destined to the building industries.

== See also ==
- List of municipalities in Valencia

== Sights ==
- Ermita de San Antonio It is an ancient hermitage dedicated to Saint Anthony and Saint Barbara, it was built during the 17th century and rebuilt between 1985 and 1989.
- Iglesia de la Asuncion The town church, its construction began in 1536, the facade has little ornamentation, only emphasizes the baroque lines of the cornice and a little chapel-niche over the gate. Inside there are three naves with barrel vaults and transept. In the intersection of the main nave and transept, there's the dome. Behind the high altar, there is the tabernacle chapel.
- Mezquita The mosque, located in the ancient town centre is one of the so little numbers of mosques from the Spanish Muslim era, because of that it became an important piece for this era's research community.
- Palacio Ducal The Duke's Palace, are the ruins of a palace built by the Bellvis family during the 14th-15th centuries, later owned to the Borja Family (the Borgias) who improved and enlarged it, the Dukes of Gandia uses this palace as a summer residence. Lately was owned to the Frasquet, local landowners family who were the last palace lords.
- Horno Alfareria The Kiln is the most ancient kiln in the town and was once part of the ceramics industry which makes Castelló an important and famous place.
- Neveras (16th to 19th centuries). You can still find some refrigerators in the term. Its function was to be a deposit of snow that was used in summer to preserve food, make ice cream and as a medicine to lower fevers. The best preserved is located at the departure dels Racons. The refrigerators are cylindrical constructions, covered with a dome, with an opening on the side and that were used to collect and preserve the snow that fell in winter to be able to use it in summer.
- La Font Early 20th century. Fountain that gives its name to one of the most characteristic streets of the town. Next to it is the building of "el llavador" formerly used to wash clothes, and the "bassa de la font" used for irrigation, and where one of the most popular acts of the August festivities is celebrated, which is " you stir it up ".
- Casa Frasquet The Frasquet Manor, was the residence of an old aristocratic local family, it was built when they abandoned and demolish the Ducal Palace, then in their own. The manor was built over the 18th century Stately oil mill. It's also known as "the pharmacy" because it houses it for several decades. Even today the house has been rebuilt still emphasize the magnificent monumental gate.
- La Torre The Tower, is a landowner's country house, built like a Moorish tower from the second half of the 19th century. Today there are only ruins remaining.
