= Agullent =

- Municipality
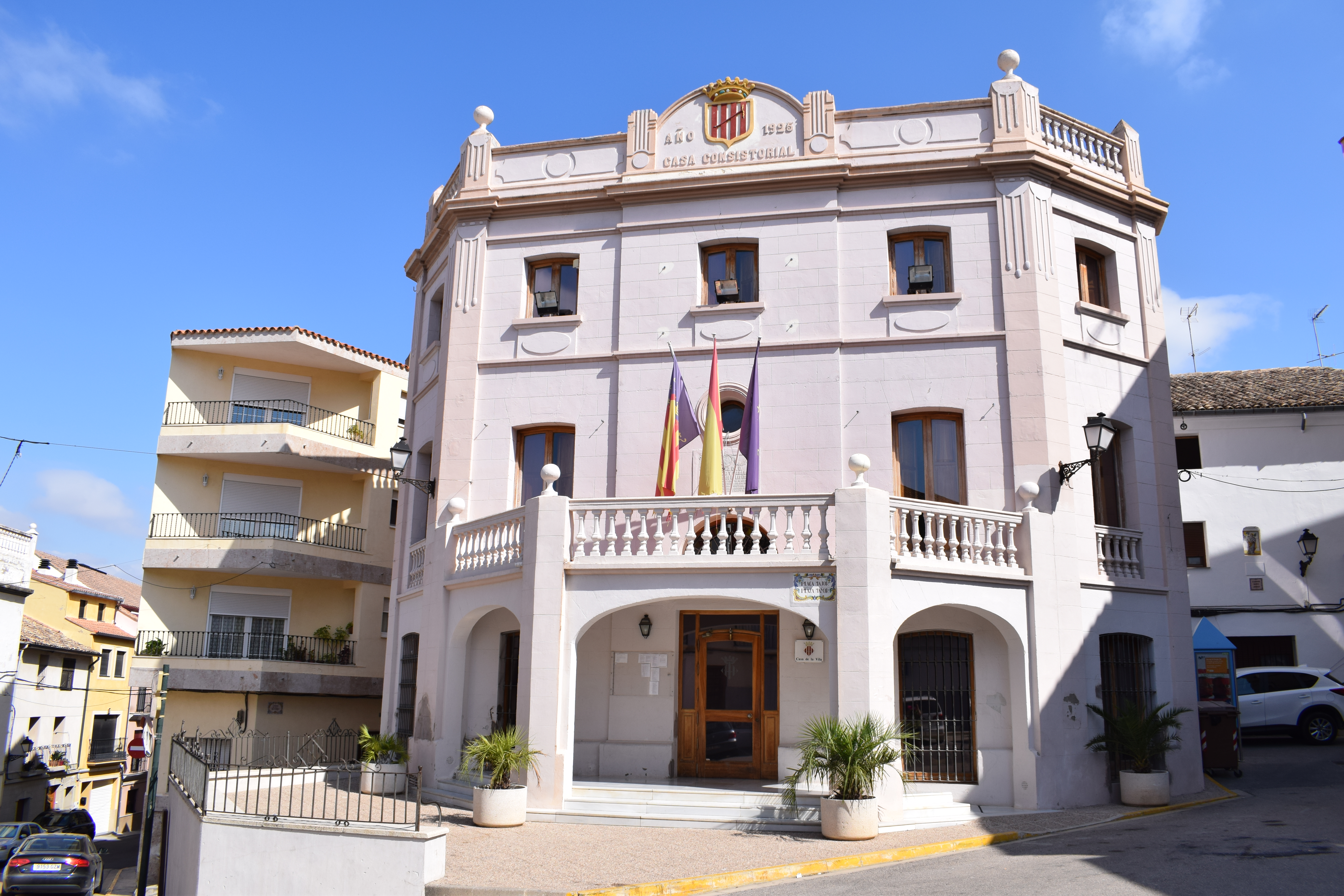

- Coat of arms

- Location in Spain
- Coordinates: 38°49′20″N 0°32′51″W
- Country: Spain
- Autonomous community: Valencian Community
- Province: Valencia
- Comarca: Vall d'Albaida
- Judicial district: Ontinyent

Government
  - Alcalde: Pau Muñoz González (Compromís)

Area
  - Total: 16.2 km^{2} (6.3 sq mi)
- Elevation: 415 m (1,362 ft)

Population (2025-01-01)
  - Total: 2,438
  - Density: 150/km^{2} (390/sq mi)
- Demonyms: Agullentí, agullentina
- Time zone: UTC+1 (CET)
  - Summer (DST): UTC+2 (CEST)
- Postal code: 46890
- Official language(s): Valencian
- Website: Official website

Agullent (Valencian: [aɣuˈʎent]) is a municipality in the comarca of Vall d'Albaida in the Valencian Community, Spain.

== See also ==
- List of municipalities in Valencia
