= Bellús =

- Municipality
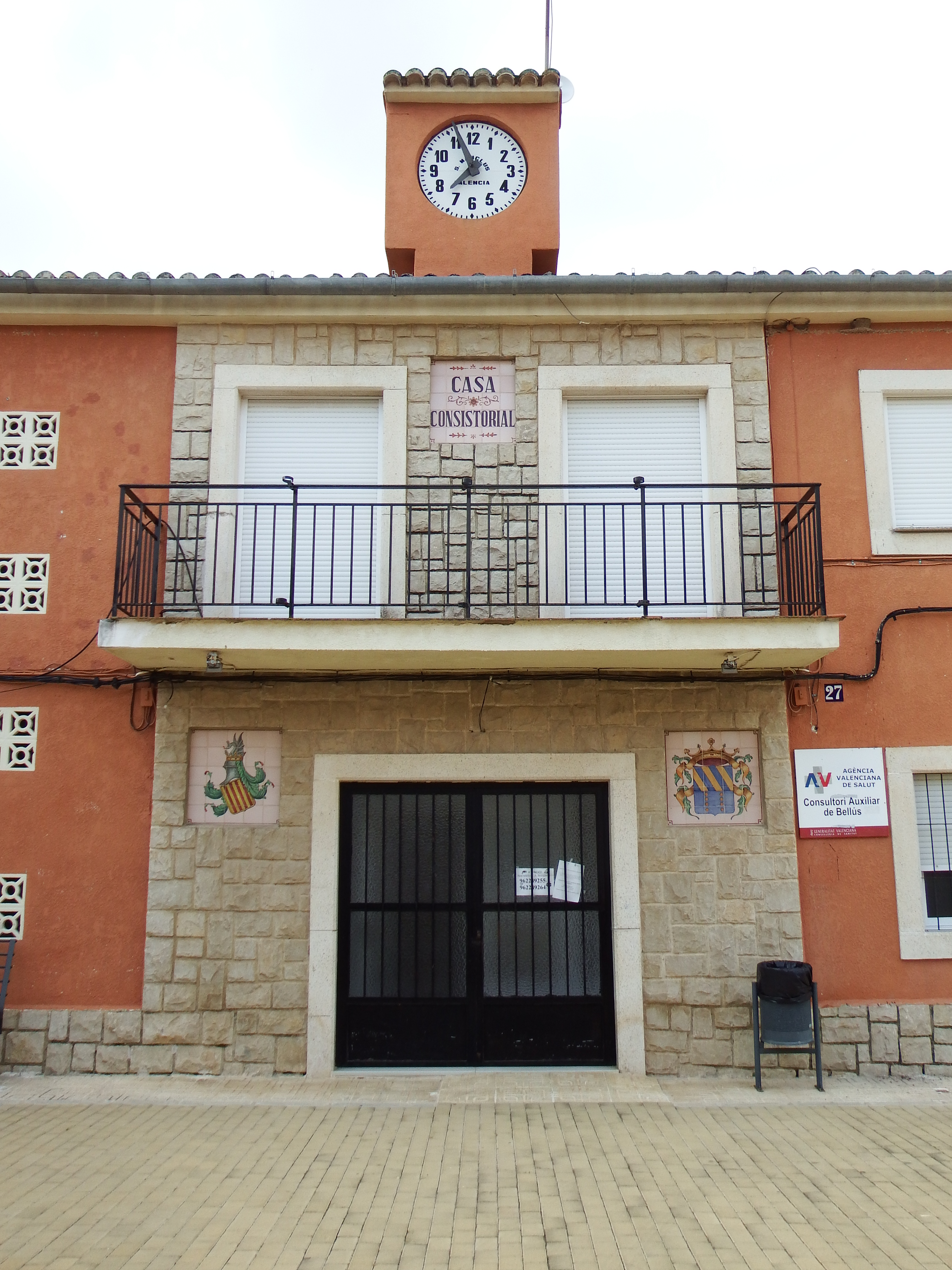
- Town hall

- Coat of arms

- Location in Spain
- Coordinates: 38°56′43″N 0°29′14″W
- Country: Spain
- Autonomous community: Valencian Community
- Province: Valencia
- Comarca: Vall d'Albaida
- Judicial district: Ontinyent

Government
  - Alcalde: Joan Vicent García Monzó

Area
  - Total: 9.5 km^{2} (3.7 sq mi)
- Elevation: 180 m (590 ft)

Population (2025-01-01)
  - Total: 317
  - Density: 33/km^{2} (86/sq mi)
- Demonym(s): Bellusser, bellussera
- Time zone: UTC+1 (CET)
  - Summer (DST): UTC+2 (CEST)
- Postal code: 46839
- Official language(s): Valencian
- Website: Official website

Bellús is a municipality in the comarca of Vall d'Albaida in the Valencian Community, Spain.

== Demographics ==
Population growth
1990	1992	1994	1996	1998	2000	2002	2004	2005	2007
415	413	408	383	391	399	385	383	385	387

== See also ==
- List of municipalities in Valencia
