= Beniatjar =

- Municipality
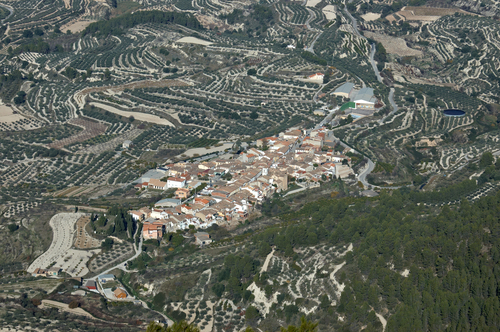

- Coat of arms

- Location in Spain
- Coordinates: 38°50′50″N 0°25′1″W
- Country: Spain
- Autonomous community: Valencian Community
- Province: Valencia
- Comarca: Vall d'Albaida
- Judicial district: Ontinyent

Government
  - Alcalde: Francisco Giner Monzó

Area
  - Total: 11.4 km^{2} (4.4 sq mi)
- Elevation: 417 m (1,368 ft)

Population (2025-01-01)
  - Total: 209
  - Density: 18.3/km^{2} (47.5/sq mi)
- Demonym(s): Beniatgerí, beniatgerina
- Time zone: UTC+1 (CET)
  - Summer (DST): UTC+2 (CEST)
- Postal code: 46844
- Official language(s): Valencian
- Website: Official website

Beniatjar is a municipality in the comarca of Vall d'Albaida in the Valencian Community, Spain.

== See also ==
- List of municipalities in Valencia
