= Bèlgida =

- Municipality
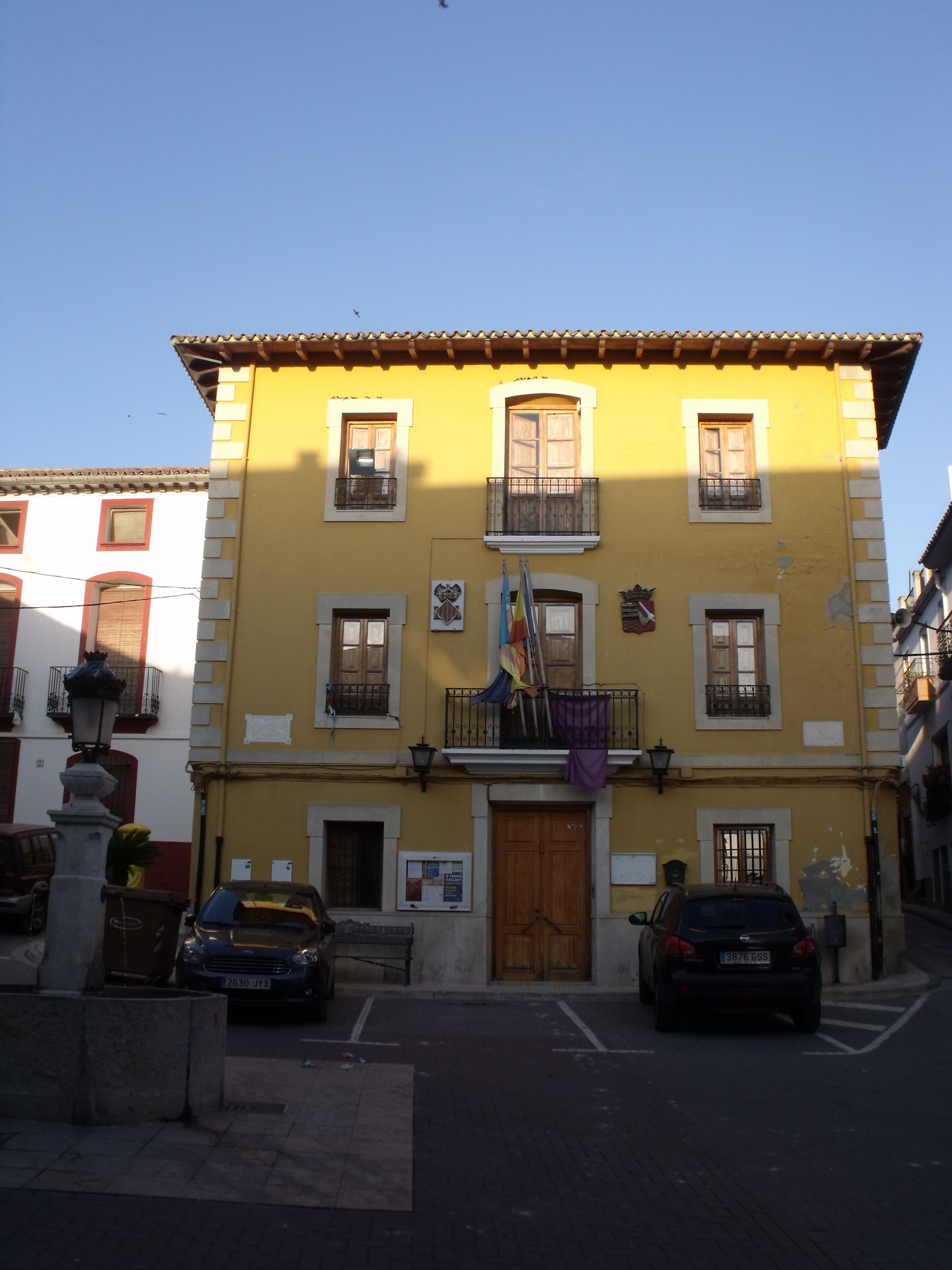
- Town hall

- Coat of arms

- Location in Spain
- Coordinates: 38°51′35″N 0°28′26″W
- Country: Spain
- Autonomous community: Valencian Community
- Province: Valencia
- Comarca: Vall d'Albaida
- Judicial district: Ontinyent

Government
  - Alcalde: Carolina Alfonso Boix

Area
  - Total: 17.3 km^{2} (6.7 sq mi)
- Elevation: 264 m (866 ft)

Population (2025-01-01)
  - Total: 651
  - Density: 37.6/km^{2} (97.5/sq mi)
- Demonym(s): Belgidà, belgidana
- Time zone: UTC+1 (CET)
  - Summer (DST): UTC+2 (CEST)
- Postal code: 46868
- Official language(s): Valencian
- Website: Official website

Bèlgida (Spanish: Bélgida) is a municipality in the comarca of Vall d'Albaida in the Valencian Community, Spain.

== See also ==
- List of municipalities in Valencia
