= Bufali =

- Municipality
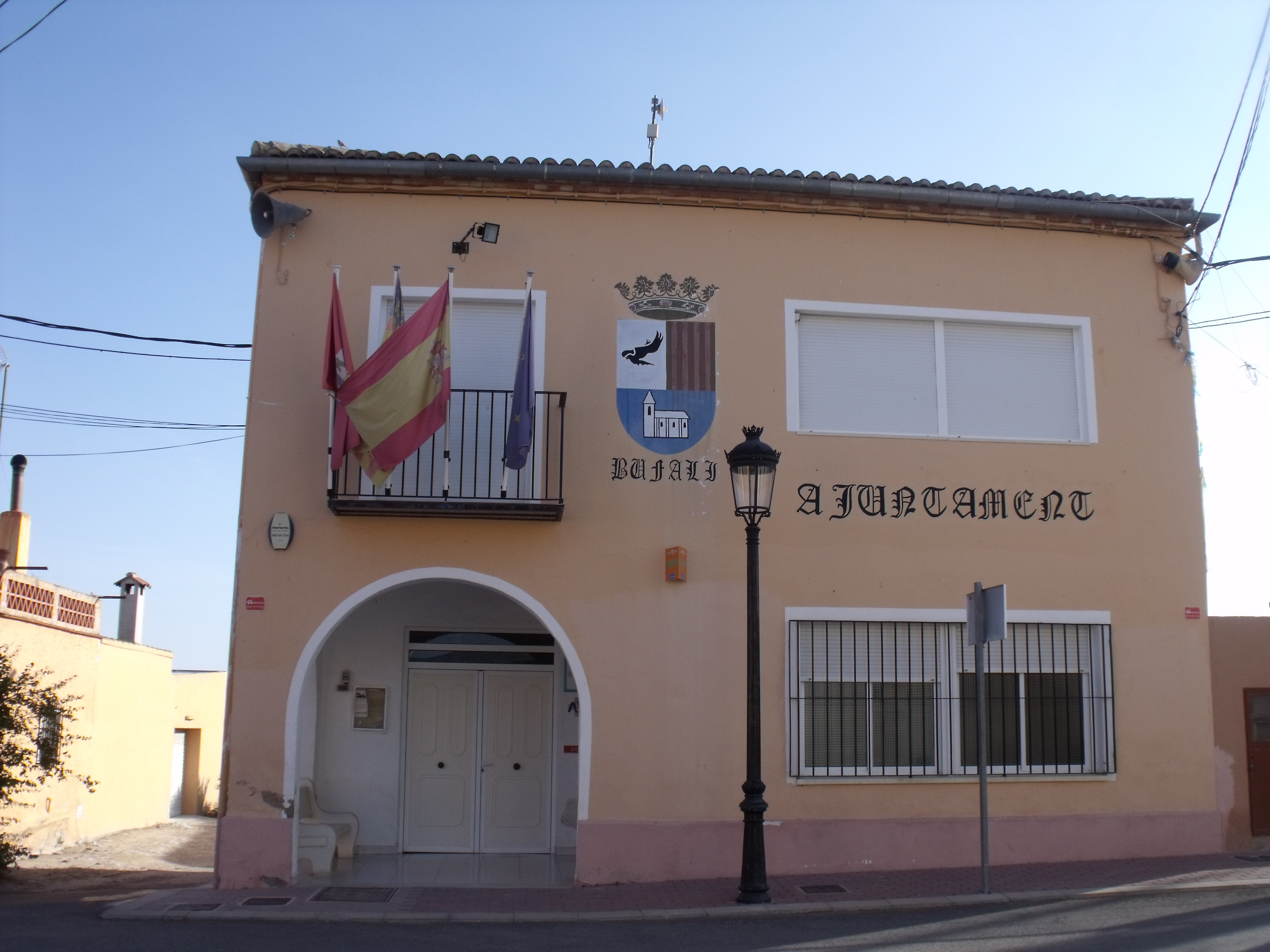
- Town hall

- Flag Coat of arms

- Location in Spain
- Coordinates: 38°52′4″N 0°30′52″W
- Country: Spain
- Autonomous community: Valencian Community
- Province: Valencia
- Comarca: Vall d'Albaida
- Judicial district: Ontinyent

Government
  - Alcalde: Juan Salvador Jordá Olcina

Area
  - Total: 3.2 km^{2} (1.2 sq mi)
- Elevation: 239 m (784 ft)

Population (2025-01-01)
  - Total: 162
  - Density: 51/km^{2} (130/sq mi)
- Demonym(s): Bufalità, bufalitana
- Time zone: UTC+1 (CET)
  - Summer (DST): UTC+2 (CEST)
- Postal code: 46891
- Official language(s): Valencian
- Website: Official website

Bufali is a village and municipality about 3 km from Albaida and 78 km from the city of Valencia, Spain. It is situated in the Vall d'Albaida.

In the village itself there is the town hall which also houses the health centre, a small school a local shop and a pharmacy. There are small naves on the edge of the village which house some light industry. Behind the naves is Bufali station (parada), which is a stop on the Xàtiva–Alcoy service operated by Renfe. Bufali holds its Fiesta in August.

== See also ==
- List of municipalities in Valencia
