= Alfarrasí =

- Municipality
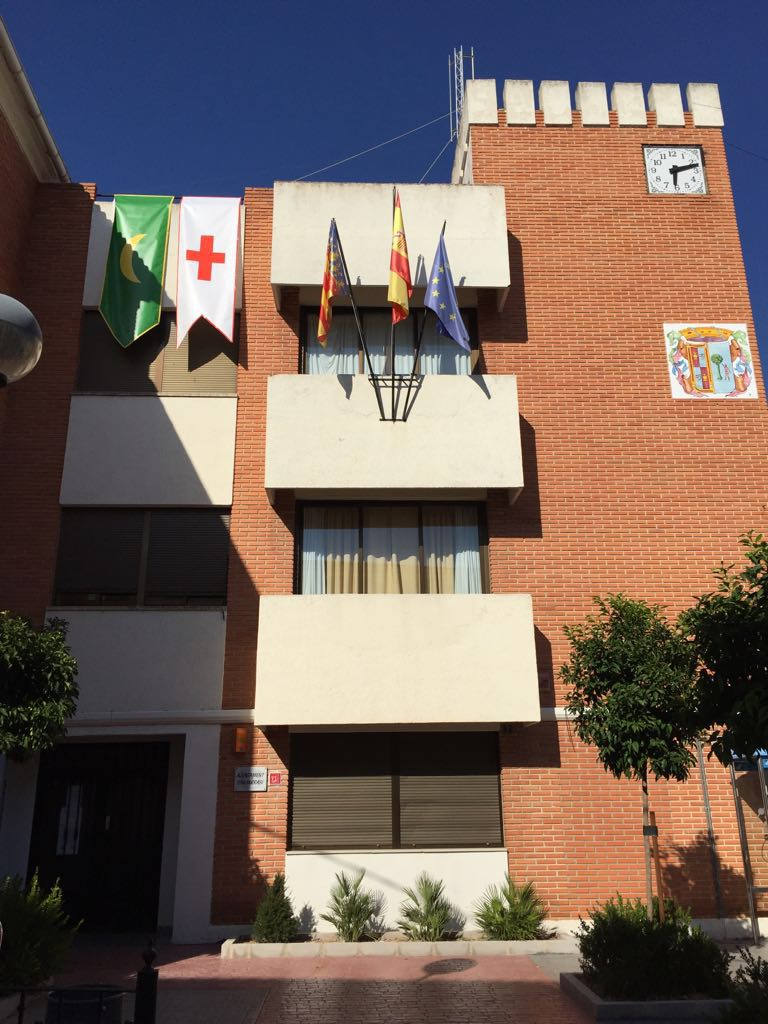
- Town hall

- Flag Coat of arms

- Location in Spain
- Coordinates: 38°54′20″N 0°29′26″W
- Country: Spain
- Autonomous community: Valencian Community
- Province: Valencia
- Comarca: Vall d'Albaida
- Judicial district: Ontinyent

Government
  - Alcalde: Federico Vidal Martínez (PSPV-PSOE)

Area
  - Total: 6.4 km^{2} (2.5 sq mi)
- Elevation: 200 m (660 ft)

Population (2025-01-01)
  - Total: 1,173
  - Density: 180/km^{2} (470/sq mi)
- Demonyms: Alfarrasiner, alfarrasinera
- Time zone: UTC+1 (CET)
  - Summer (DST): UTC+2 (CEST)
- Postal code: 46893
- Official language(s): Valencian
- Website: Official website

Alfarrasí (Valencian: [alfaraˈzi]; Spanish: [alfaraˈsi]) is a municipality in the comarca of Vall d'Albaida in the Valencian Community, Spain.

== See also ==
- List of municipalities in Valencia
