= Guadasséquies =

- Municipality
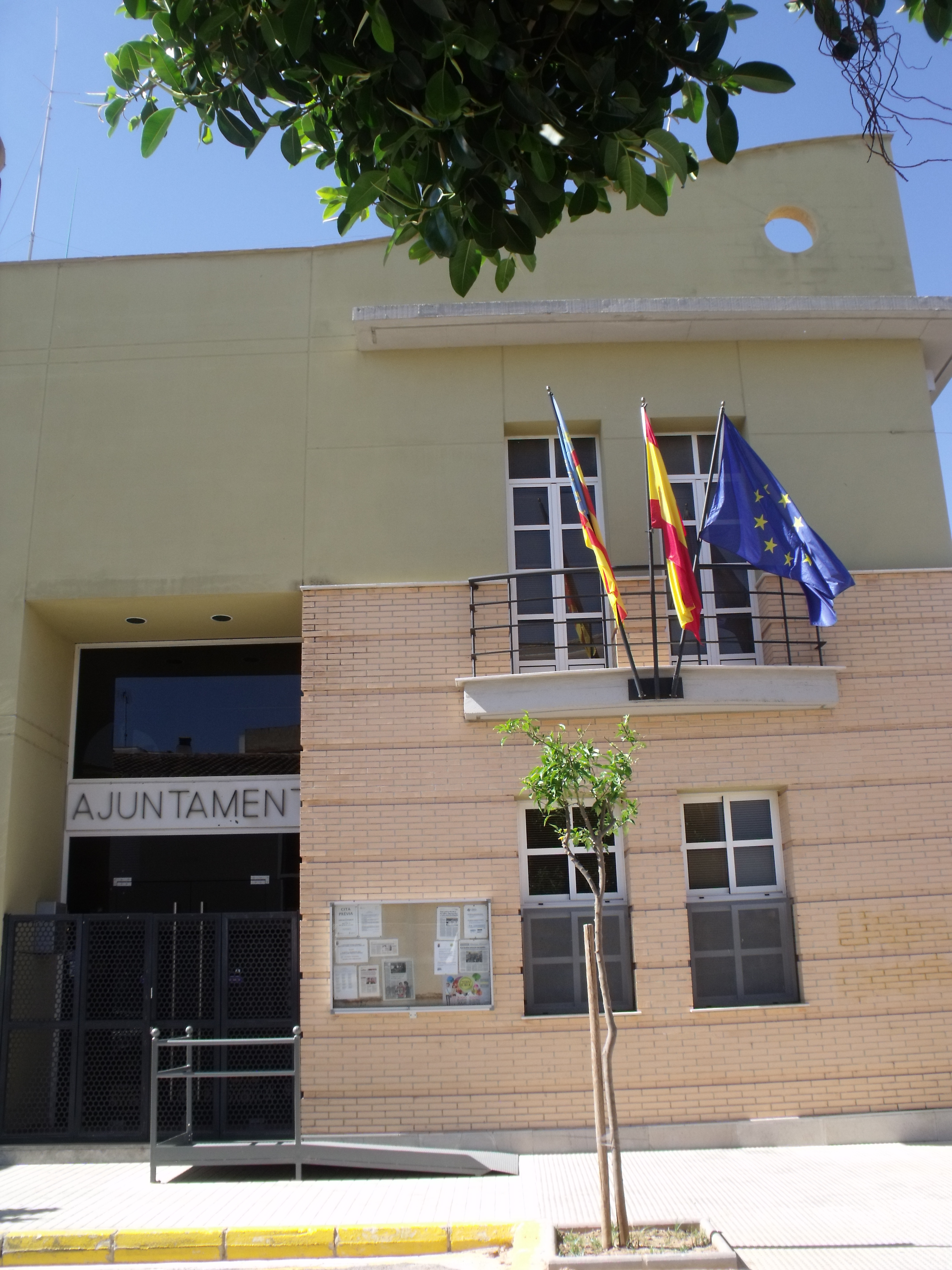
- Town hall

- Coat of arms

- Location in Spain
- Coordinates: 38°55′26″N 0°29′10″W
- Country: Spain
- Autonomous community: Valencian Community
- Province: Valencia
- Comarca: Vall d'Albaida
- Judicial district: Ontinyent

Government
  - Alcalde: Carmen Vidal Vallés

Area
  - Total: 3.3 km^{2} (1.3 sq mi)
- Elevation: 180 m (590 ft)

Population (2025-01-01)
  - Total: 478
  - Density: 140/km^{2} (380/sq mi)
- Demonym(s): Guadassequià, guadassequiana
- Time zone: UTC+1 (CET)
  - Summer (DST): UTC+2 (CEST)
- Postal code: 46839
- Official language(s): Valencian
- Website: Official website

Guadasséquies (Valencian pronunciation: [ˌɡwaðaˈsekies], Spanish: Guadasequies) is a municipality in the comarca of Vall d'Albaida in the Valencian Community, Spain.

== See also ==
- List of municipalities in Valencia
