= El Palomar, Spain =

El Palomar
- Municipality
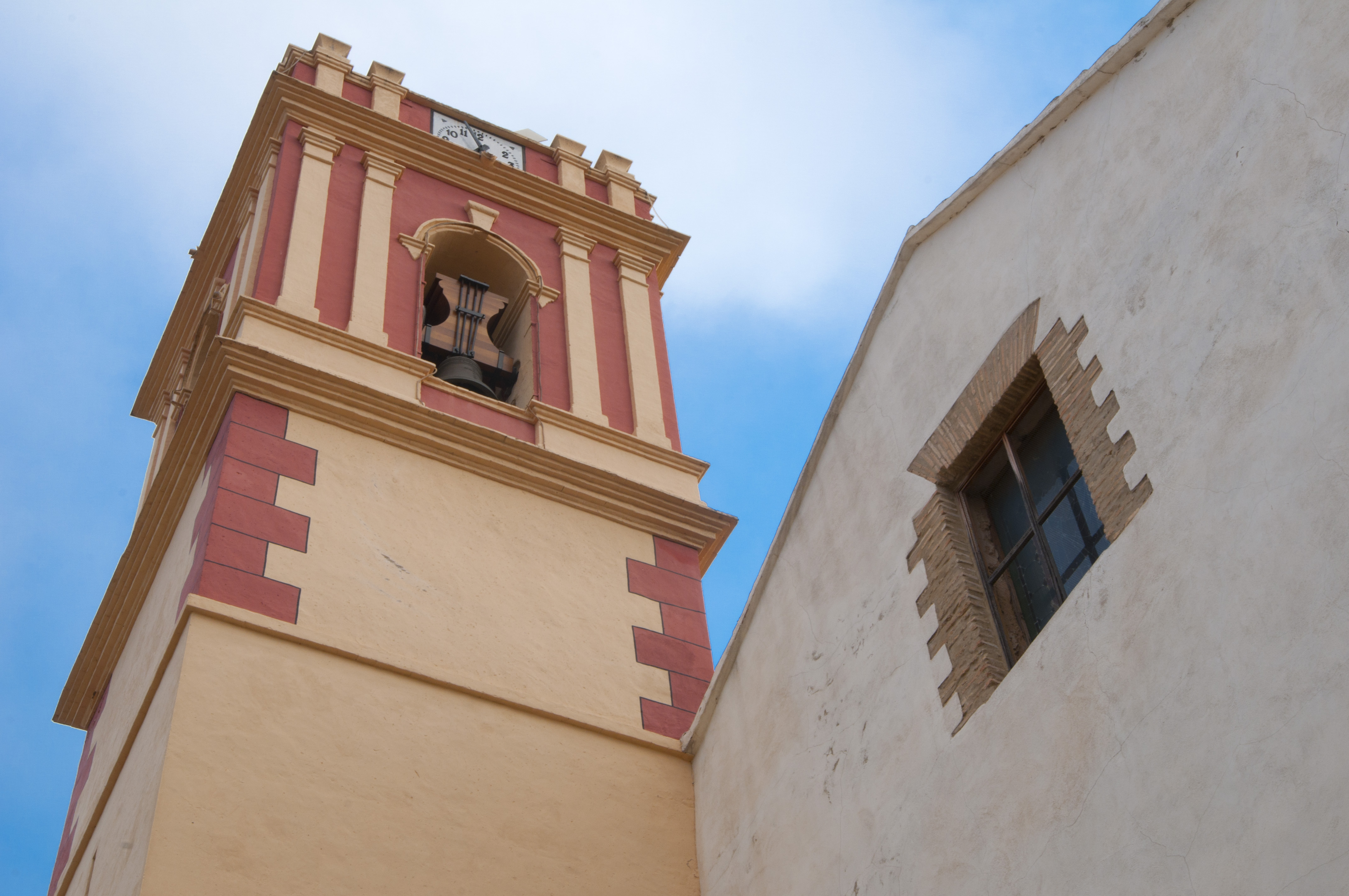

- Flag Coat of arms

- Location in Spain
- Coordinates: 38°51′13″N 0°30′10″W
- Country: Spain
- Autonomous community: Valencian Community
- Province: Valencia
- Comarca: Vall d'Albaida
- Judicial district: Ontinyent

Government
  - Alcalde: Jordi Vila Vila

Area
  - Total: 7.80 km^{2} (3.01 sq mi)
- Elevation: 192 m (630 ft)

Population (2025-01-01)
  - Total: 593
  - Density: 76.0/km^{2} (197/sq mi)
- Demonym(s): Palomerenc, palomerenca
- Time zone: UTC+1 (CET)
  - Summer (DST): UTC+2 (CEST)
- Postal code: 46891
- Official language(s): Valencian
- Website: Official website

El Palomar is a municipality in the comarca of Vall d'Albaida in the Valencian Community, Spain.

== See also ==
- List of municipalities in Valencia
