= Montaverner =

- Municipality
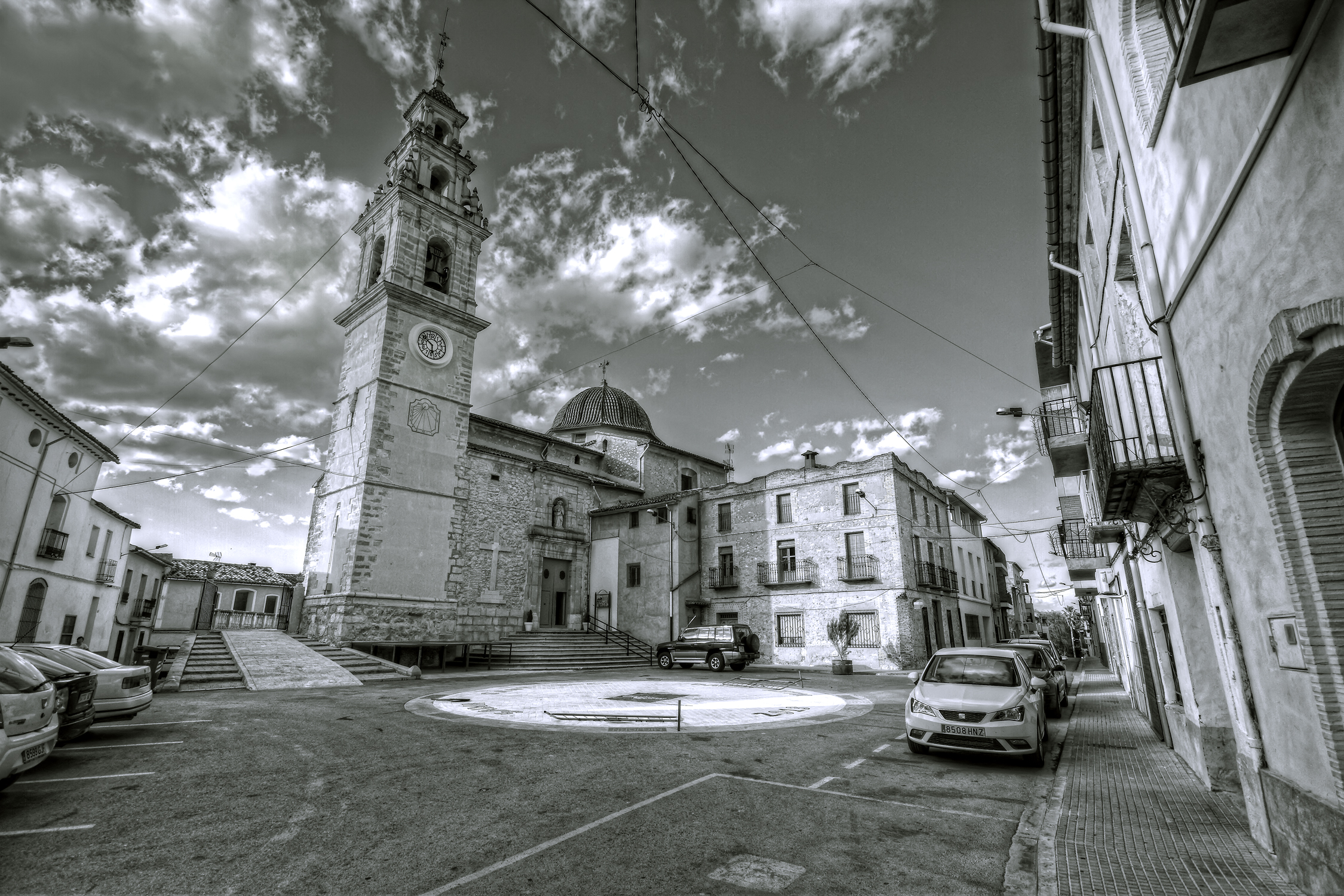

- Coat of arms

- Location in Spain
- Coordinates: 38°53′18″N 0°29′46″W
- Country: Spain
- Autonomous community: Valencian Community
- Province: Valencia
- Comarca: Vall d'Albaida
- Judicial district: Ontinyent

Government
  - Alcalde: María Belén Esteve Pina

Area
  - Total: 7.4 km^{2} (2.9 sq mi)
- Elevation: 200 m (660 ft)

Population (2025-01-01)
  - Total: 1,624
  - Density: 220/km^{2} (570/sq mi)
- Demonym(s): Montaverní, montavernina
- Time zone: UTC+1 (CET)
  - Summer (DST): UTC+2 (CEST)
- Postal code: 46892
- Official language(s): Valencian
- Website: Official website

Montaverner is a municipality in the Comunitat Valenciana, Spain. It belongs to the province of Valencia, in the region of Vall d’Albaida.

== Toponymy ==
The toponym derives, according to Joan Coromines, from the Arabic منطب النهر (mantab an-nahr, "the ? of the stream"). Its resemblance to mount and tavern is due to popular etymology.

== Geography and Environment ==
Integrated in the region of Vall d’Albaida, it is located 80 kilometers from Valencia. The municipal area is crossed by the national highway N-340 between pK 823 and 826 and by the regional highways CV-60 (Ollería-Gandía) and CV-62 (Albaida-Montaverner).

The municipality is located in the center of the region, on the banks of the Clariano River and the Albaida River. In the recreational area located next to a fountain with four jets ("Font dels Quatre Xorros") is the mouth of the Clariano River in the Albaida River. The Bellús reservoir, which dams the waters of the Albaida River, occupies part of the territory in the extreme northeast. The altitude ranges between 285 meters to the southeast and 150 meters on the banks of the Albaida River. The town stands at 186 meters above sea level.

In the municipality you can take "la ruta de les fonts" (the route of the fountains), a route bordering the Albaida river and presenting the different existing fountains. A walk that joins orchard, dry land and a river tour to visit different fountains or the steps of the Albaida river. Of low difficulty, the route doesn't entail any danger. You can also visit the washhouses of the Molí and the Quatre Xorros.

Abandoned fountains: -Font de l'Algar. -Font del Pas. -Font de Guillem o Teula. -Font de Gregorio. -Font de Mariano. -Font de Maties. -Font de Pepito. -Font d'Ambrosio	Accessible fountains: -Font dels 4 Xorros. -Font de l'Angles. -Font del Molí. -Font del Povil. -Font de Ca Blanc. -Font de les Marxaletes

Bordering towns:

Northwest: Alfarrasí	North: Alfarrasí	Northeast: Benisuera and Otos (exclave)
West: Palomar		East: Bèlgida
Southwest: Palomar	Sur: Palomar	Southeast: Bèlgida

== History ==
Although there are archaeological remains in the municipality (a Roman column in the Pla de Colata, remains from the Bronze Age in the Plaça Major and Tossal del Calvari) and in its demarcation there were the farmsteads of Colata and Collatella, the origin is found in the visit made by King Jaume I in 1270. It was he who decided to found a town at the confluence of the Albaida and Clariano rivers in order to secure the road that linked Valencia with Alicante. Thus, on August 26, 1271, the Carta Puebla was granted, establishing the first settlers from Barcelona, who had to leave the land due to the Al-Azraq revolt in 1276. After belonging to the Lord of Albaida for the years 1281-1296 It became "the king's town", dependent on the term of Xàtiva and exempt from feudal rule.

The expulsion of the Moors in 1609 produced a strong demographic crisis, going from housing 60 houses to 30, since its inhabitants, all of them old Christians, had to go to the surrounding towns in order to repopulate them. It's in this century when the town suffered the plague of the garrotillo (1677–1678) and experienced the Miracle de Sant Blai (Second day of Easter 1678, April 11). During the 18th century the current Church was built, where at that time the following streets were located: Major, Montons, de los Penadesos, de dalt, quatre cantons, Alacant, and Plaça; while in 1789 the existence of Mayor, Montons, Panaderos, Sant Vicent, Alacant and Molí streets was recorded.

The N-340 highway built between 1860 and 1862, the bridges (“Llarg” and “Curt”), completed in 1890 and the passage of the railway (1893) led to a demographic increase, exceeding 1000 inhabitants at the beginning of the 20th century. During this century there was the phylloxera crisis (1910), the creation of the El Trobador factory (1920s) and the industrial and urban development during the second half of the century. The beginning of the 21st century has brought with it the improvement of communications in the region (Central Highway, CV-60 Ollería-Gandía, viaduct over Albaida river), the construction of the industrial estate, sports center, Lluis Peiró Auditorium,...

From past times there are witnesses in the form of various utensils on a hill natively called "Tossal del Calvari". More recent are the remains of a rustic Roman villa found in the area of Colata.

The origin of the population is a Muslim farmhouse incorporated by King Jaume I at the end of Xàtiva. On August 26, 1271, it was granted a population letter, with tax exemption for 10 years. On December 4 of that year, the donation of inheritances and plots was confirmed, which led to a conflict of those who weren't favored with Peter the Great. Being subject to the Bailiwick and Government of Xàtiva, it never had a territorial lord because it belonged to the Crown. In 1535 obtaines the ecclesiastical independence of Albaida. The expulsion of the Moors decimated the population by two thirds and made Colado, Vistabella and Behalí disappear as towns, of which ruins are preserved in the municipal area.

== Parish History ==
The town was born as a Christian community due to the arrival of the first settlers from Barcelona, who brought with them the Christian faith. During the first centuries it belonged to the Parroquia Asunción de N.S. de Albaida, and dismembered from it, was founded in 1535 with the territories of Montaverner, Colata and Bufali. In 1605, the parish priest Pere Leandro Sanchis orders and organizes the sacramental documents. The expulsion of the Moors in 1609 brought with it the disappearance of the festival of San Juan, and in 1624 the Cofradía de la Virgen del Rosario (Brotherhood of the Virgen del Rosario) was founded, also highlighting the construction of the second hermitage of Colata in this century. Already on the second day of Easter in 1678, the Miracle de Sant Blai took place, thanks to the image from Bèlgida. The 18th century was the century of Dr. José Esplugues, born in Agullent in 1705 and died in Montaberner in 1787, the construction of the Parish Church and the verification of the life and most relevant events of the parish were due to him, thanks to his manuscript "Llibre de l'Esglèsia Parroquial". The Lawsuit of Colata also took place, by which the justice assigned the item that bears this name to the municipal area. During the 19th century, different associations were created in honor of the Sacred Heart of Jesus.

The Parish Church began to be built in 1735 until the beginning of 1758. There are three bells in the tower: the oldest, Santo Tomás de Villanueva, dates from 1817, while the other two, Maria dels Dolors and María Loreto, were cast in 1941. The Colegio de las Monjas is also in its demarcation, in a dilapidated state and built during the 1940s.

== Demography ==
Demographic evolution

1990	1992	1994	1996	1998	2000	2002	2004	2005	2007	2008	2018	2022
1.698	1.670	1.679	1.711	1.662	1.702	1.722	1.748	1.763	1.833	1.853	1.666	1.747

Montaverner is a municipality in the comarca of Vall d'Albaida in the Valencian Community, Spain.

== See also ==
- List of municipalities in Valencia
