= Quatretonda =

- Municipality
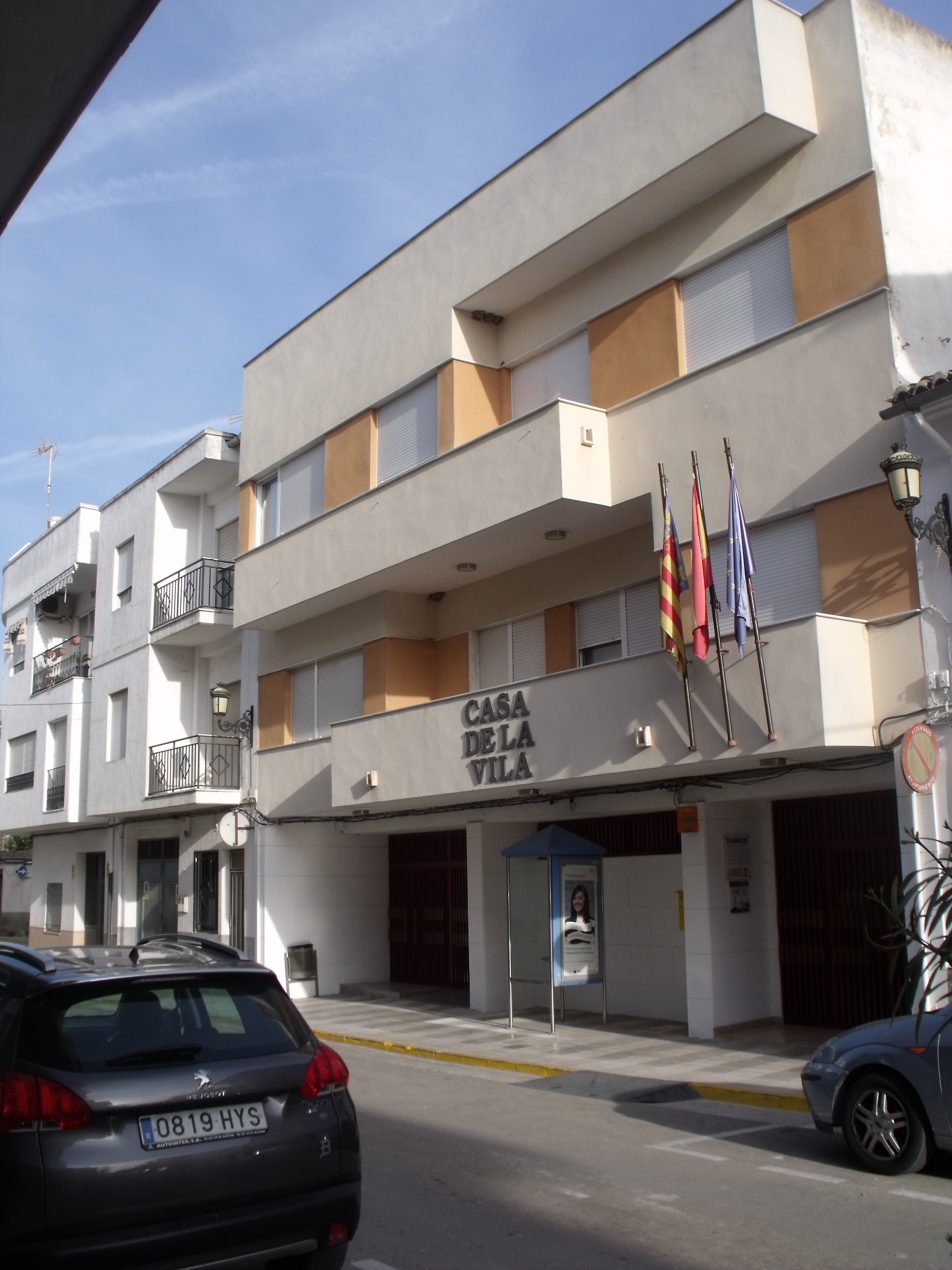
- Town hall

- Coat of arms

- Location in Spain
- Coordinates: 38°56′45″N 0°24′11″W
- Country: Spain
- Autonomous community: Valencian Community
- Province: Valencia
- Comarca: Vall d'Albaida
- Judicial district: Ontinyent

Government
  - Alcalde: David Mahiques (PSOE)

Area
  - Total: 43.5 km^{2} (16.8 sq mi)
- Elevation: 190 m (620 ft)

Population (2025-01-01)
  - Total: 2,174
  - Density: 50.0/km^{2} (129/sq mi)
- Demonym(s): Quatretondí, quatretondina
- Time zone: UTC+1 (CET)
  - Summer (DST): UTC+2 (CEST)
- Postal code: 46837
- Official language(s): Valencian
- Website: Official website

Quatretonda (Valencian IPA: [ˌkwatɾeˈtonda], Spanish and unofficially: Cuatretonda IPA: [ˈkwatɾeˈtonda]) is a municipality in the comarca of Vall d'Albaida in the Valencian Country, Spain.

== See also ==
- List of municipalities in Valencia
