= Benissuera =

- Municipality
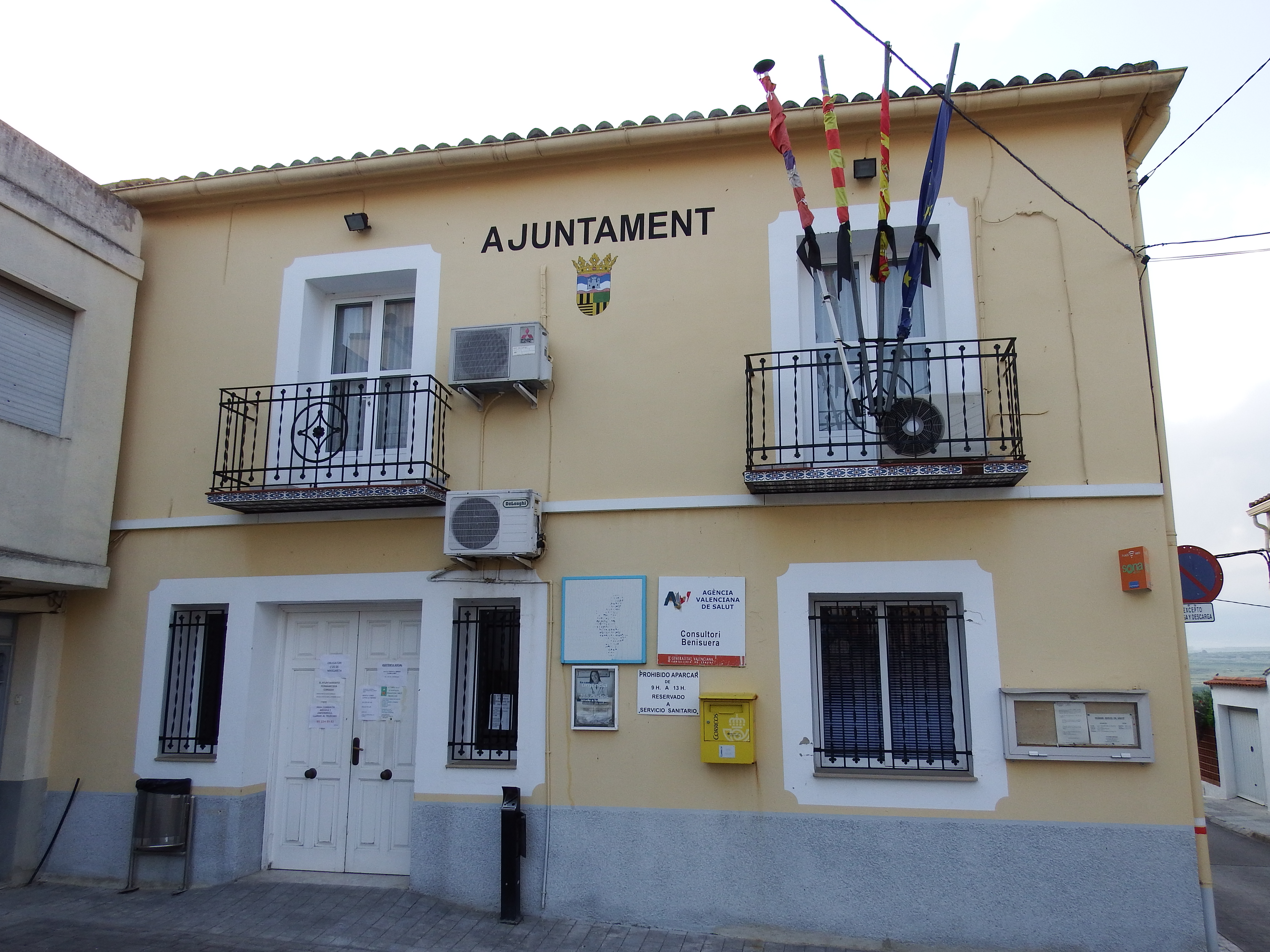
- Town hall

- Flag Coat of arms

- Location in Spain
- Coordinates: 38°54′47″N 0°28′41″W
- Country: Spain
- Autonomous community: Valencian Community
- Province: Valencia
- Comarca: Vall d'Albaida
- Judicial district: Ontinyent

Government
  - Alcalde: María Lirios Pla Benet

Area
  - Total: 2.1 km^{2} (0.81 sq mi)
- Elevation: 200 m (660 ft)

Population (2025-01-01)
  - Total: 196
  - Density: 93/km^{2} (240/sq mi)
- Demonym(s): Benissuerà, benissuerana
- Time zone: UTC+1 (CET)
  - Summer (DST): UTC+2 (CEST)
- Postal code: 46839
- Official language(s): Valencian
- Website: Official website

Benissuera (Valencian pronunciation: [benisuˈeɾa], Spanish: Benisuera) is a municipality in the comarca of Vall d'Albaida in the Valencian Community, Spain.

== See also ==
- List of municipalities in Valencia
