= Benigànim =

- Municipality
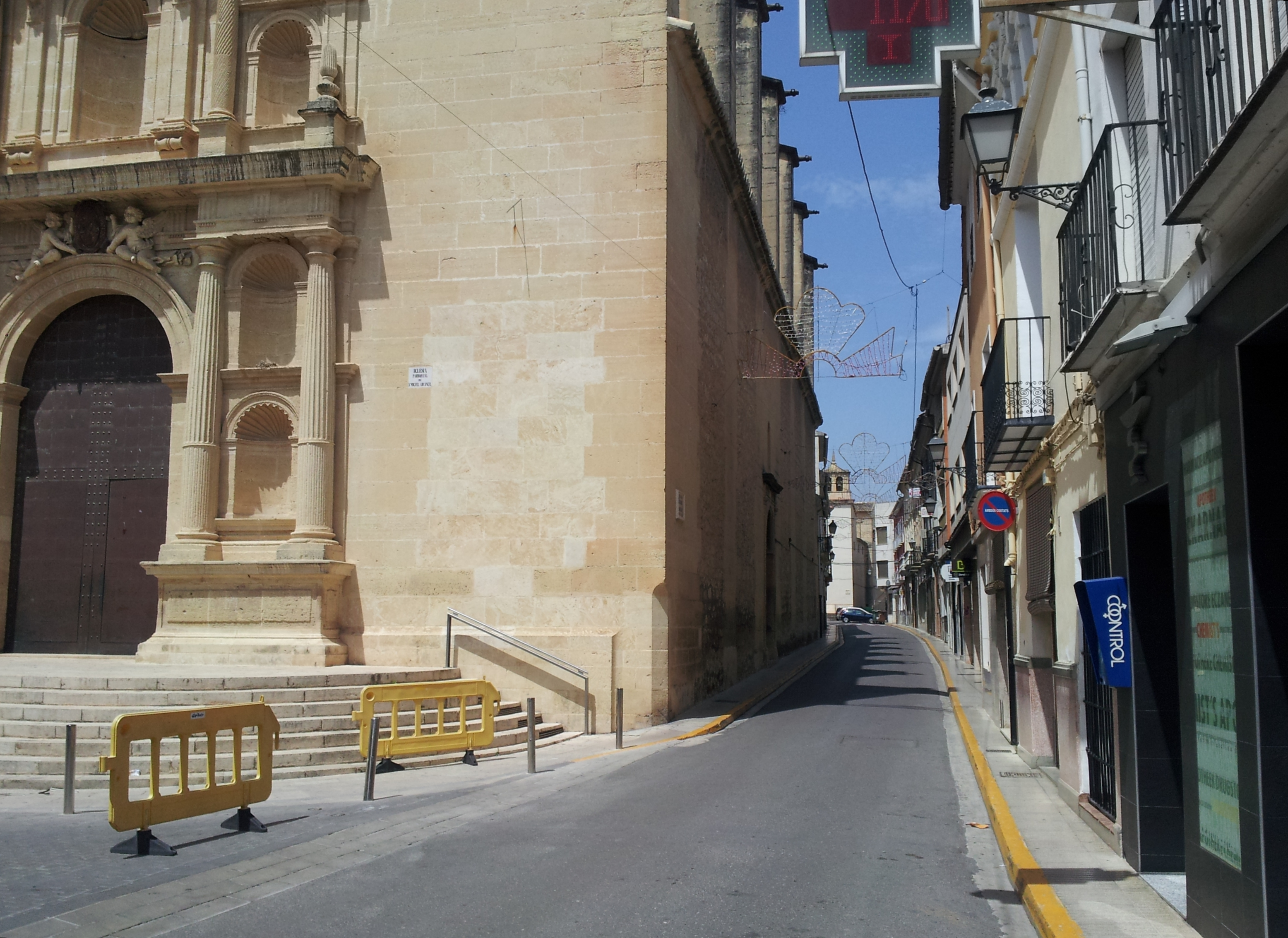

- Coat of arms

- Location in Spain Benigànim (Valencian Community) Benigànim (Spain)
- Coordinates: 38°56′35″N 0°26′36″W
- Country: Spain
- Autonomous community: Valencian Community
- Province: Valencia
- Comarca: Vall d'Albaida
- Judicial district: Ontinyent

Area
  - Total: 33.4 km^{2} (12.9 sq mi)
- Elevation: 120 m (390 ft)

Population (2025-01-01)
  - Total: 5,759
  - Density: 172/km^{2} (447/sq mi)
- Demonym(s): Beniganí, beniganina
- Time zone: UTC+1 (CET)
  - Summer (DST): UTC+2 (CEST)
- Postal code: 46830
- Official language(s): Valencian
- Website: Official website

Benigànim is a municipality in the comarca of Vall d'Albaida in the Valencian Community, Spain.

== See also ==
- List of municipalities in Valencia
