= Sempere =

Sempere Sant Pere d'Albaida
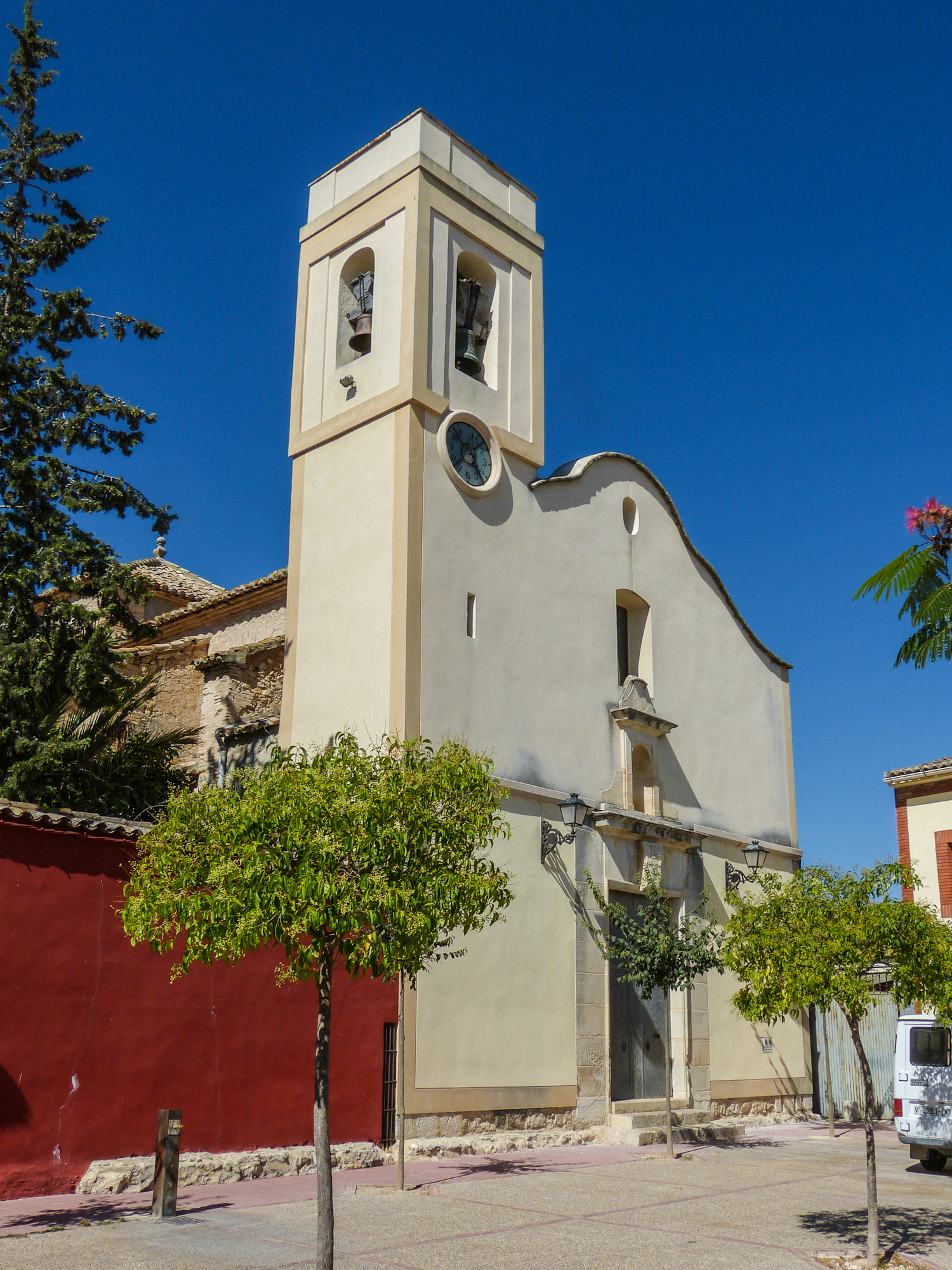

- Coat of arms
- Interactive map of Sempere
- Coordinates: 38°55′12″N 0°28′49″W
- Country: Spain
- Autonomous community: Valencian Community
- Province: Valencia
- Comarca: Vall d'Albaida

Area
  - Total: 3.83 km^{2} (1.48 sq mi)
- Elevation: 250 m (820 ft)

Population (2025-01-01)
  - Total: 33
  - Density: 8.6/km^{2} (22/sq mi)

Sempere, also known as Sant Pere d'Albaida, is a municipality in the comarca of Vall d'Albaida in the Valencian Community, Spain.

== See also ==
- List of municipalities in Valencia
