= Otos, Spain =

Otos
- Municipality
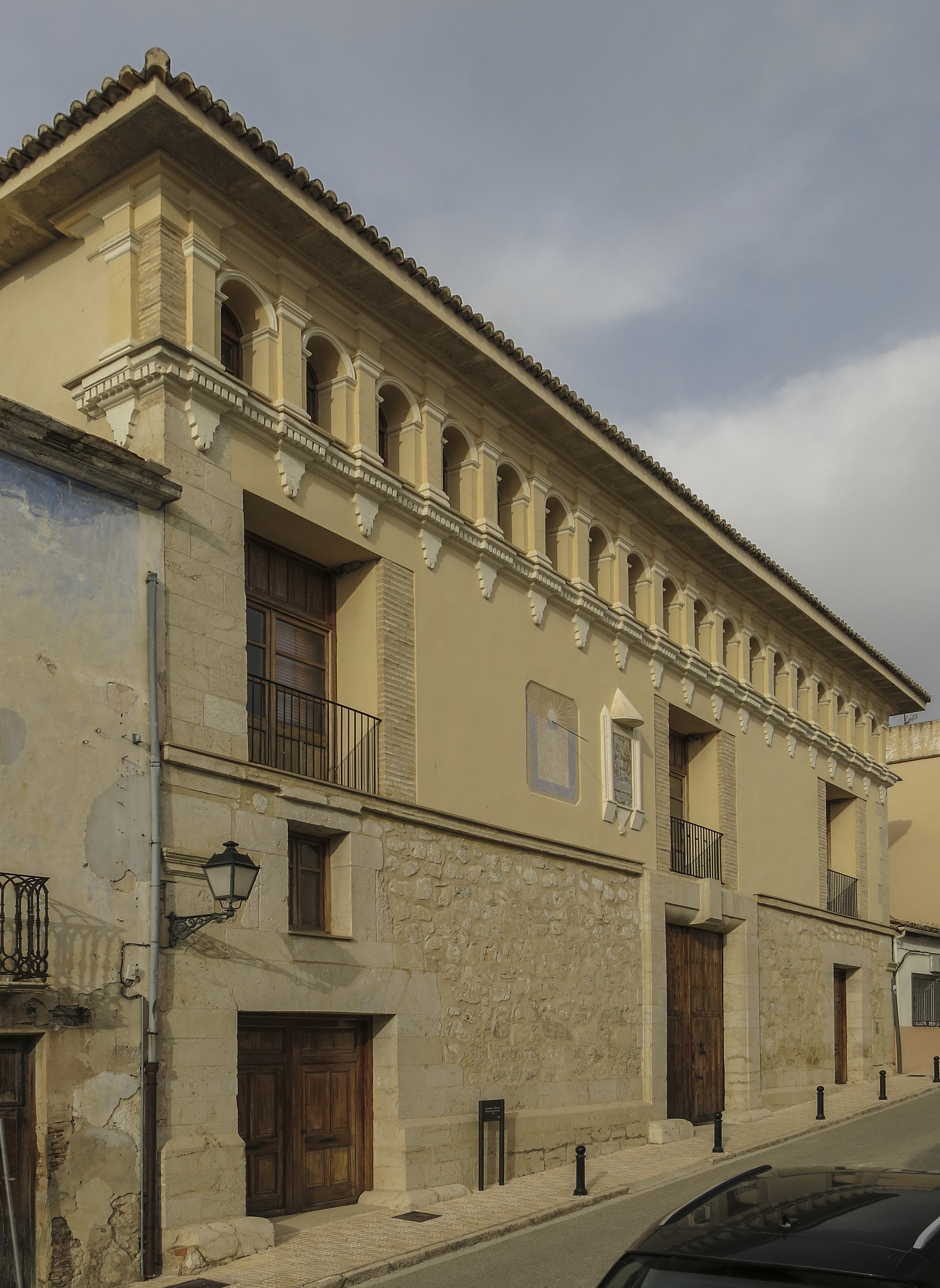
- Town hall

- Coat of arms

- Location in Spain
- Coordinates: 38°51′15″N 0°26′41″W
- Country: Spain
- Autonomous community: Valencian Community
- Province: Valencia
- Comarca: Vall d'Albaida
- Judicial district: Ontinyent

Government
  - Alcalde: Emilio José Mira Quilis (IdPV)

Area
  - Total: 11.1 km^{2} (4.3 sq mi)
- Elevation: 400 m (1,300 ft)

Population (2025-01-01)
  - Total: 442
  - Density: 39.8/km^{2} (103/sq mi)
- Demonym: Otosí/na
- Time zone: UTC+1 (CET)
  - Summer (DST): UTC+2 (CEST)
- Postal code: 46844
- Official language(s): Valencian
- Website: Official website

Otos is a municipality in the comarca of Vall d'Albaida in the Valencian Community, Spain.

== See also ==
- List of municipalities in Valencia
