= Pinet, Spain =

Pinet
- Municipality
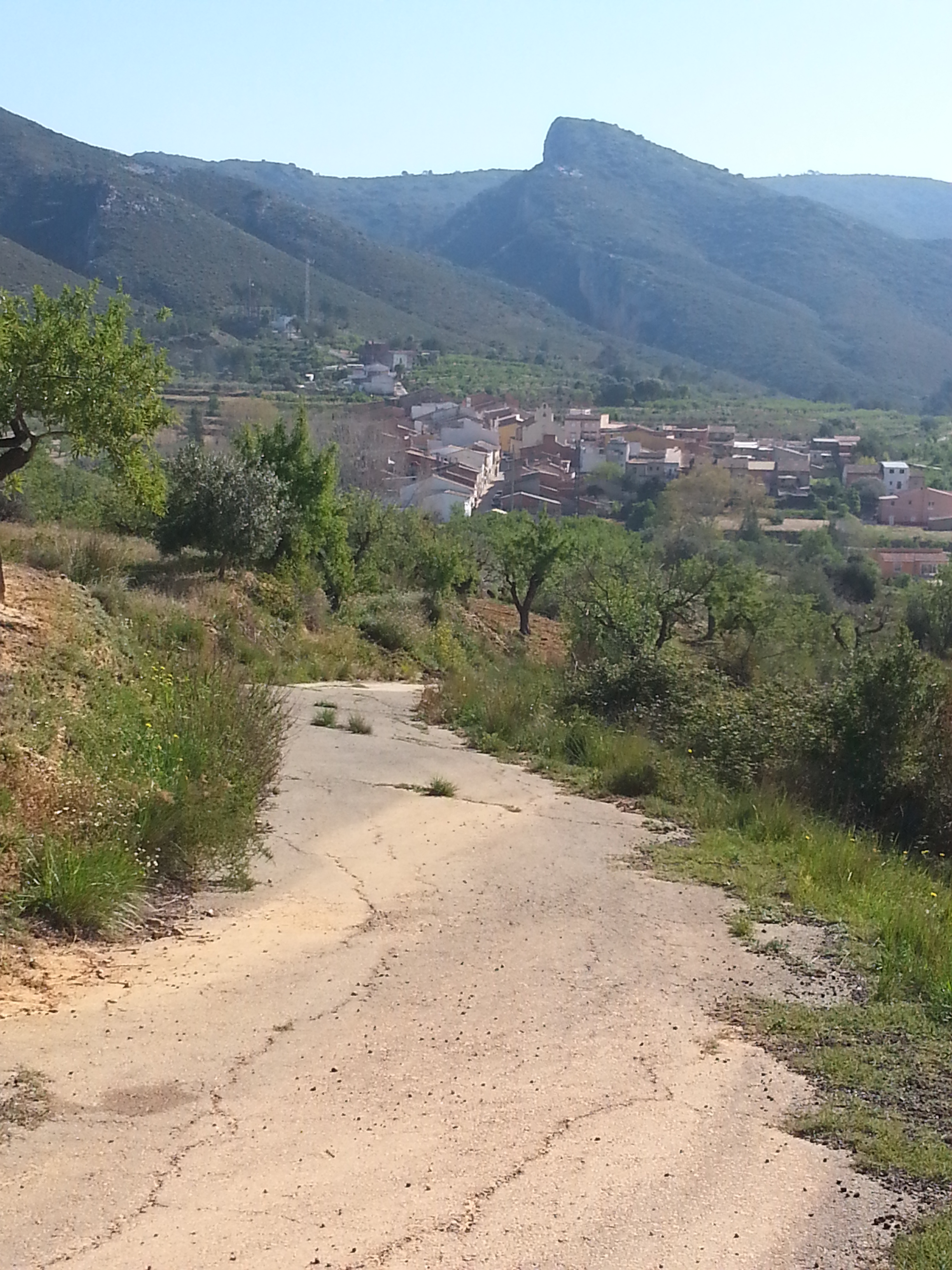

- Flag Coat of arms

- Location in Spain
- Coordinates: 38°59′0″N 0°20′17″W
- Country: Spain
- Autonomous community: Valencian Community
- Province: Valencia
- Comarca: Vall d'Albaida
- Judicial district: Ontinyent

Government
  - Alcalde: Gonzalo Catalá Mahiques (PP)

Area
  - Total: 11.9 km^{2} (4.6 sq mi)
- Elevation: 359 m (1,178 ft)

Population (2025-01-01)
  - Total: 156
  - Density: 13.1/km^{2} (34.0/sq mi)
- Demonym(s): Pinetell, pinetella
- Time zone: UTC+1 (CET)
  - Summer (DST): UTC+2 (CEST)
- Postal code: 46838
- Official language(s): Valencian and Spanish
- Website: Official website

Pinet is a municipality located in the north-east of the comarca of Vall d'Albaida in the south of the province of Valencia, Valencian Community, Spain, and some 82.6 km from the regional capital, Valencia.

Pinet borders with the following municipalities: Barx, Quatretonda, Gandia and Llutxent, all of which lie within the province of Valencia.

== Etymology ==
The name of the municipality is derived from the Valencian term pi, meaning “pine tree”.

== History and demography ==
The origins of Pinet date from a settlement established in the Islamic era, which included a farmstead and defensive fortification located on a hill above the village. The fortification was destroyed in the 13th century by Christian troops, with only its ruins remaining today. By the 13th century, the village belonged to the barony of Llutxent, falling first under the authority of the Maza family, and subsequently under the houses of Mandas and Dos Aguas.

In 1530, Pope Clement VII created the Vicariate of Pinet, which was run under the authority of the Dominicans of Llutxent until 1835.

By 1646, only 20 inhabitants were recorded as living in the municipality following the expulsion of the Moriscos, which was undertaken with particular intensity in Valencia.

Towards the end of the 18th century, the population had risen to around 150 inhabitants, before reaching some 300 hundred at the beginning of the 20th century.

By 1920, the population had reached 434 inhabitants, from which point it entered a progressive decline in consonance with the rural flight experienced in many areas throughout Spain during the 20th century.

Recent demographic trend
1990	1992	1994	1996	1998	2000	2002	2004	2005	2007
268	249	252	235	228	212	207	192	185	190

== Economy ==
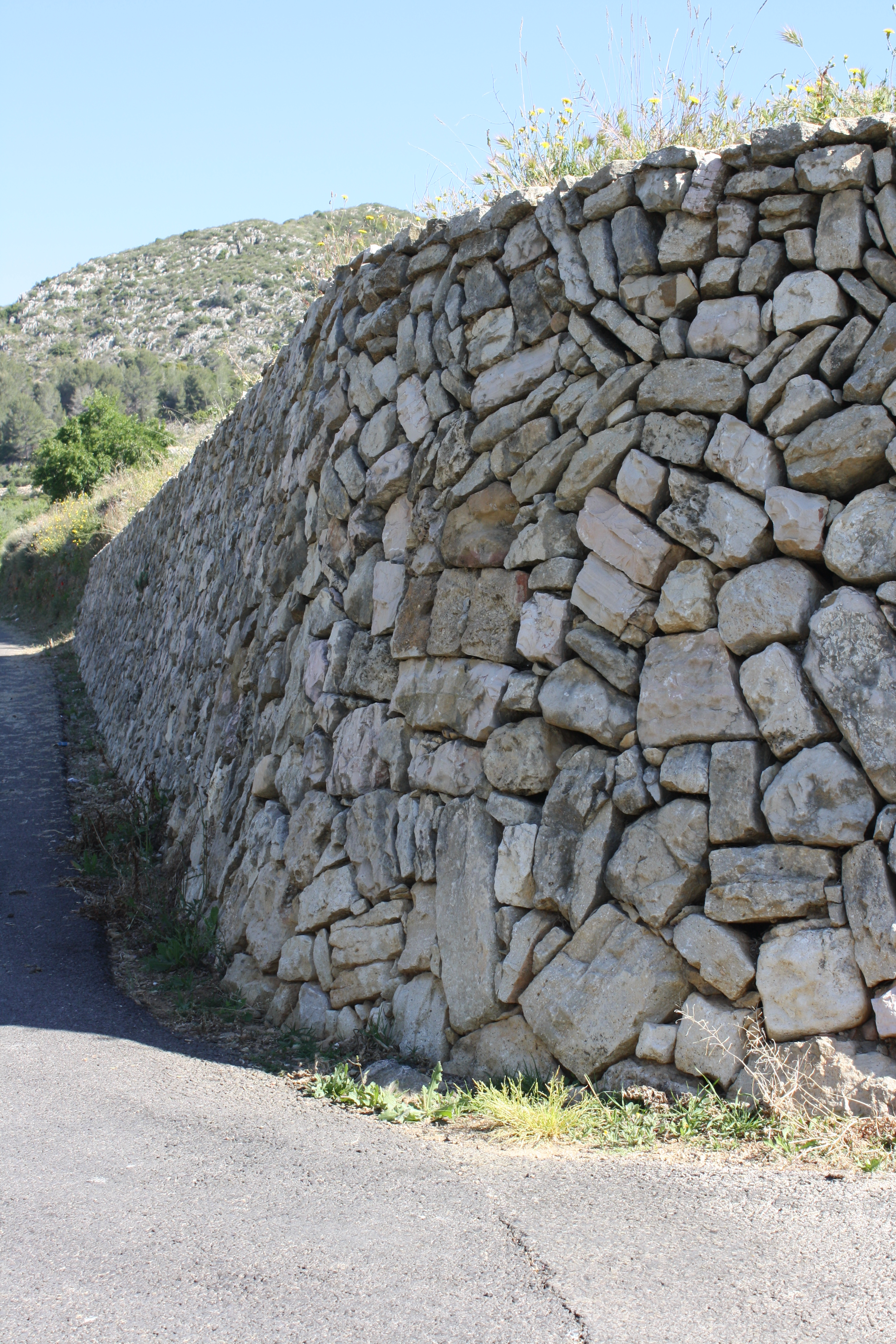
Dry stone wall in Pinet

The local economy was traditionally based on a combination of dryland (grape, prune, olive, almond and carob, among others) and irrigation (apple and other fruit) agriculture, dry stone walling and the production of baskets, rugs, espadrilles, hats and other articles made from esparto and palm leaves.

Shepherd in Pinet

In common with other rural areas throughout Spain, these activities have been in decline since the mid-20th century, their place having been taken by livestock farming (poultry, sheep and pig farming), services, construction and tourism, and specifically activities related to cycling, rock climbing and hiking.

== Geography and topography ==
Pinet is located in the north-east of the Valle de Albaida comarca and covers an area of 11.9 km2.

It is situated at the eastern extreme of the Sierra Grossa mountain range, a karstic environment with a strong predominance of limestone soils with dolomites. The village itself is located at the head of a south-facing horse-shoe shaped valley, the surface of which is composed of reddish marl deposited by water erosion originating in the mountains that lie at its north-easterly and northern extremes.

The municipality’s altitude ranges from 466 metres above sea level in its most southerly point, to 700 metres above sea level in the area known as Alto del Collado dels Caragols, located in its north east. The village of Pinet lies at an altitude of 348 metres.

Pinet is located on the poorly defined Pinet Syncline, which runs from North-North West to South-South East. This structure would appear to have been formed by two large, vertical faults.

=== River Pinet ===
The River Pinet runs through the municipality from north to south, running eventually into the River Vernisa, which is in turn an affluent of the River Serpis.

As is characteristic with the rivers and streams in the region, the River Pinet is a wash, that is, a stream bed that is dry during the summer months and which carries abundant water following the typical heavy rains known as cold drop which fall in autumn and spring.

== Climate ==
The municipality enjoys a typically Mediterranean climate, characterised by hot summers and relatively cold winters, with an average of two snowfalls per year. The climate is rated Csa in accordance with the Köppen climate classification system.

The average annual temperature is around 17 °C, with maximums in summer of 45 °C and minimum in winter of -7 °C.

Rainfall averages around 600 mm per year, although recent years have seen volumes of more than 1000 mm, mainly due to the large downpours to which the area is subject during the autumn as a result of the weather phenomenon known as cold drop.

== Flora and fauna ==
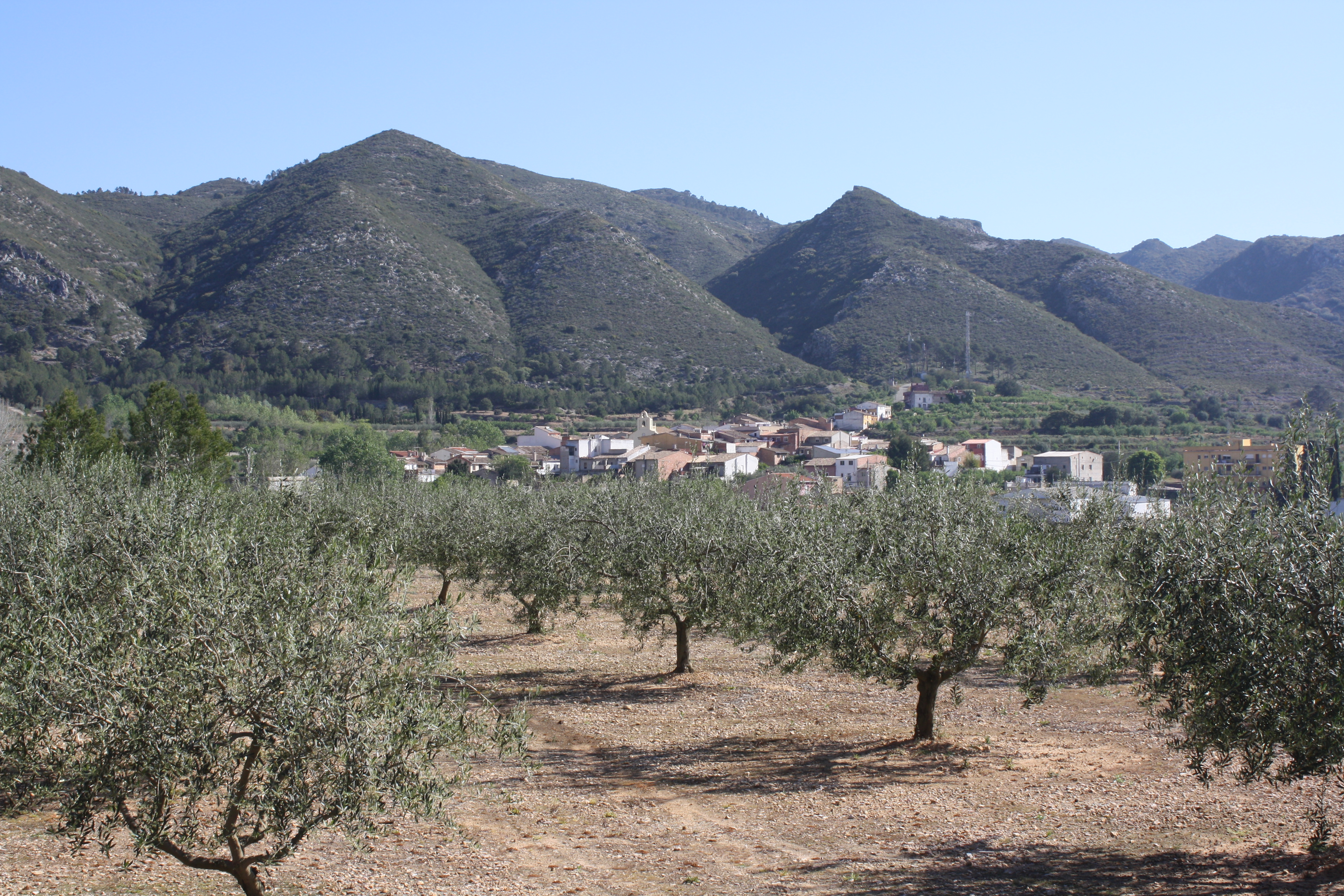
Olive trees in Pinet

The predominant vegetation in the lower valley is that associated with dryland fruit farming (almonds, olives, apricots, etc.), whilst the surrounding mountains host pine and cork forests and shrubland, interspersed with holly oak and wild herbs and plants such as silene diclinis, laurel, snapdragon, honeysuckle, rosemary, thyme, oregano, etc.

The forested areas are home to such animal species as Bonelli's eagle, golden eagle, short-toed snake eagle, common bent-wing bat, finch and greenfinch, whilst the fruit trees are host to such species as titmice, sparrow, blackbird, golden oriole, wren, nightingale, Cetti's warbler and wagtail, among others.

There are also wild boar and rabbit present in the area.

=== El Surar ===
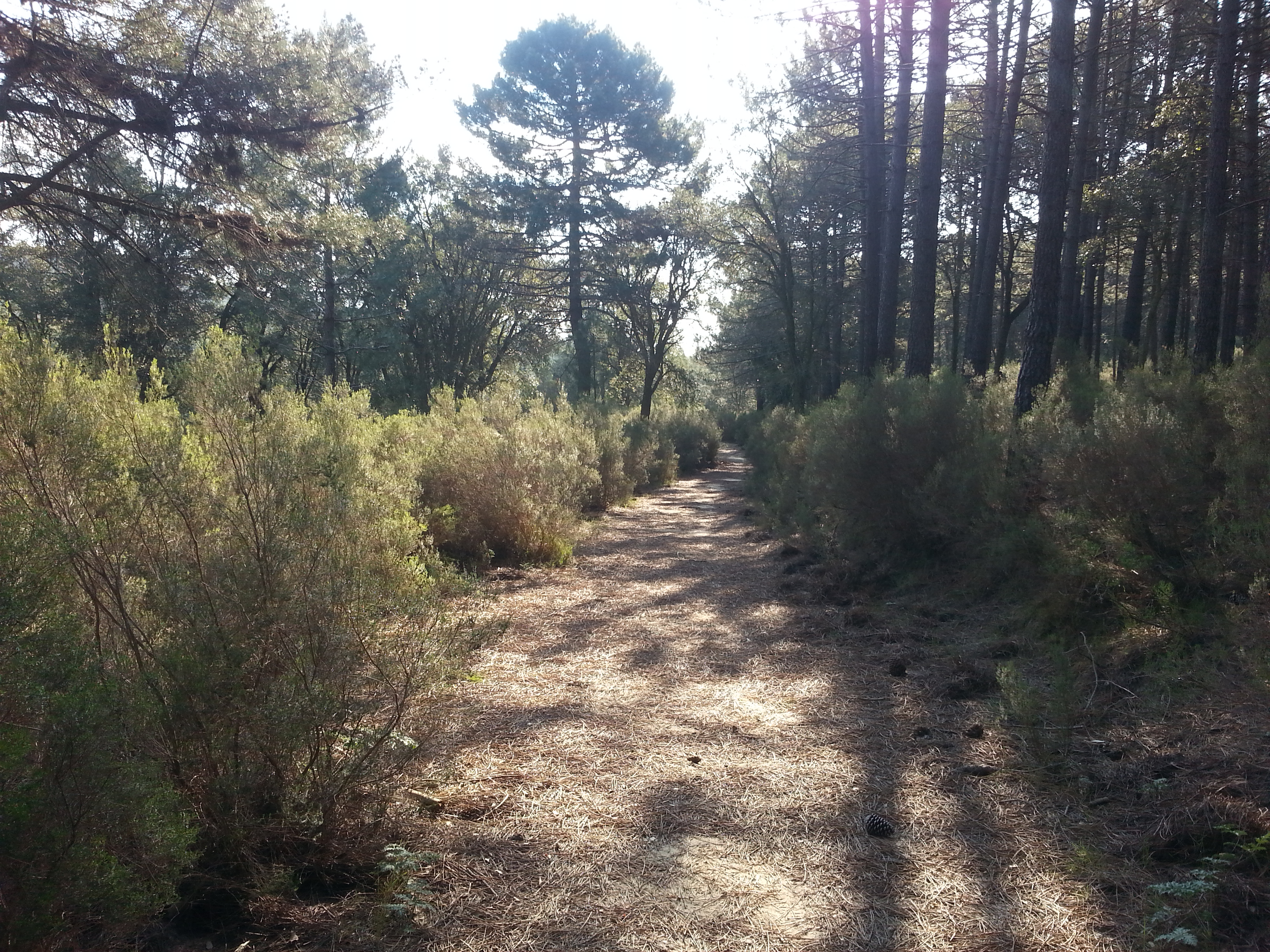
El Surar

El Surar (in Spanish, El Paraje Natural Municipal de El Surar^{[2]}), the southernmost cork oak forest in Valencia, is a Municipal Natural Park located in the municipalities of Pinet and Llutxent.

Declared a Municipal Natural Park by Generalitat Valenciana on March 4, 2005, it can be accessed on foot, by bicycle, on horseback or by car via signposted roads and tracks from the village of Pinet.

== Active Tourism ==
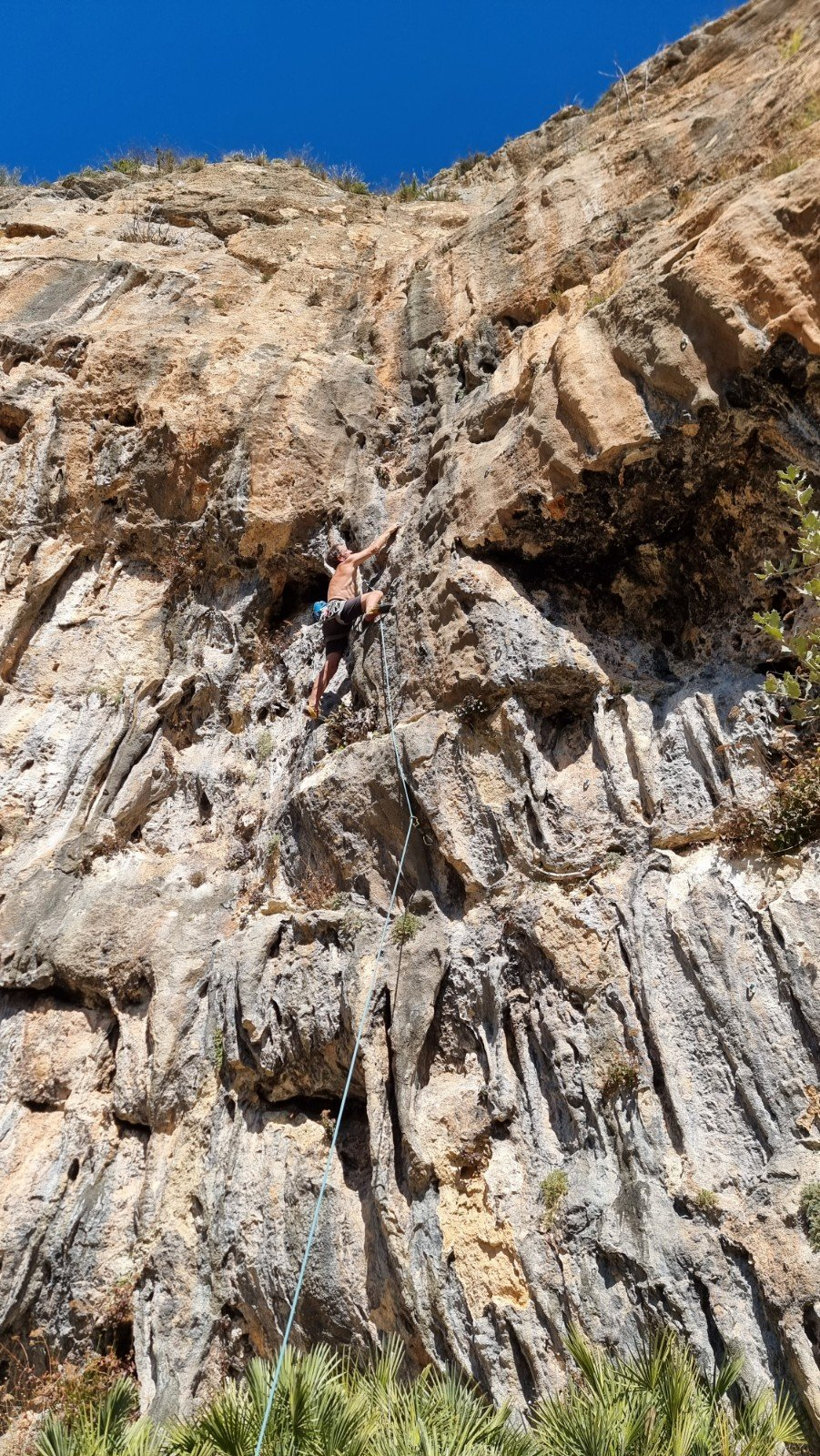
Rock climbing in Pinet

Due to its mountainous, relatively traffic-free surroundings, tracks and trails and its nearby cultural heritage, which includes 13th-century monasteries and Muslim castles, Pinet has become a focus for various active tourism pursuits that can be practiced in the vicinity, including gravel, MTB, road, and touring cycling, rock climbing and hiking.

=== Rock climbing ===
The karstic, mainly limestone mountains of the Sierra Grossa that surround Pinet currently contain eight signposted climbing sectors with around 180 recently developed, bolted routes (40 5 to 6a, 100 6a+ to 7a+ and 30 harder), many of which can be accessed on foot from the village itself.

=== Valencian Monasteries Route ===
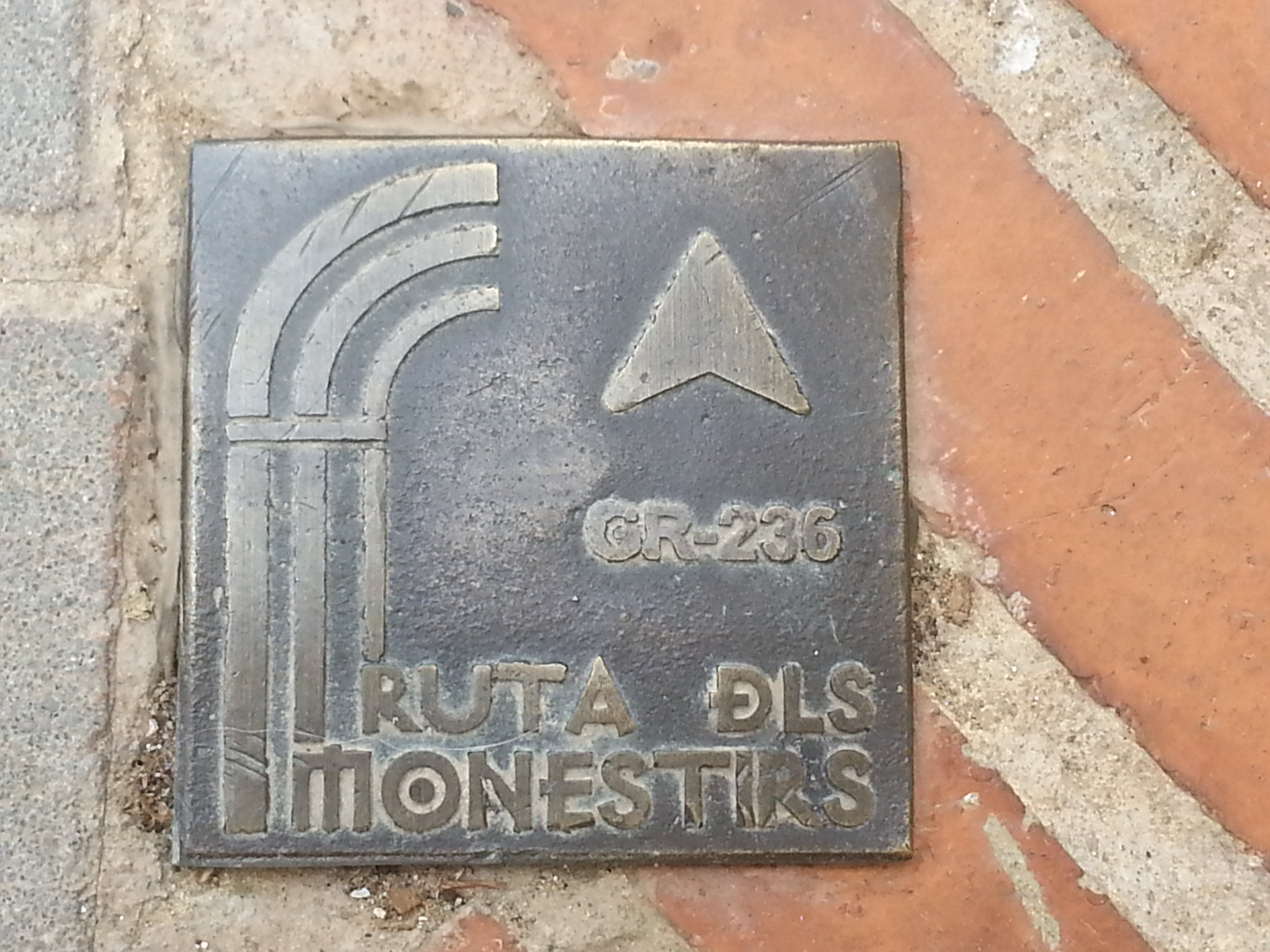
Valencian Monasteries Route marker in Pinet

Pinet lies on the Route of the Monasteries of Valencia (GR-236), a religious and cultural route that connects the five monasteries of Cotalba, Llutxent, Simat, Aguas Vivas and La murta, all located in central region of the Province of Valencia (Valencian Community).

The hiking route covers some 90 km and follows different medieval paths, such as the Pas del Pobre (Passage of the Poor), riding trails, mountain trails, old roads and repurposed railway tracks. It starts at Gandia railway station and ends in Alzira railway station and can usually be completed in 3-4 days.

The itinerary by MTB or gravel bike is a circular route of 123 km, which starts and ends in Alzira and which crosses the central comarca regions of La Safor, la Vall d'Albaida and La Ribera Alta. This route has a specific signage and a dedicated path adapted for mountain and gravel bicycles.

Of the Route’s four different itineraries, three (by foot, on horseback and by MTB) pass through Pinet, with a separate variant also passing through El Surar.

=== Roda la Vall Cycling Route ===
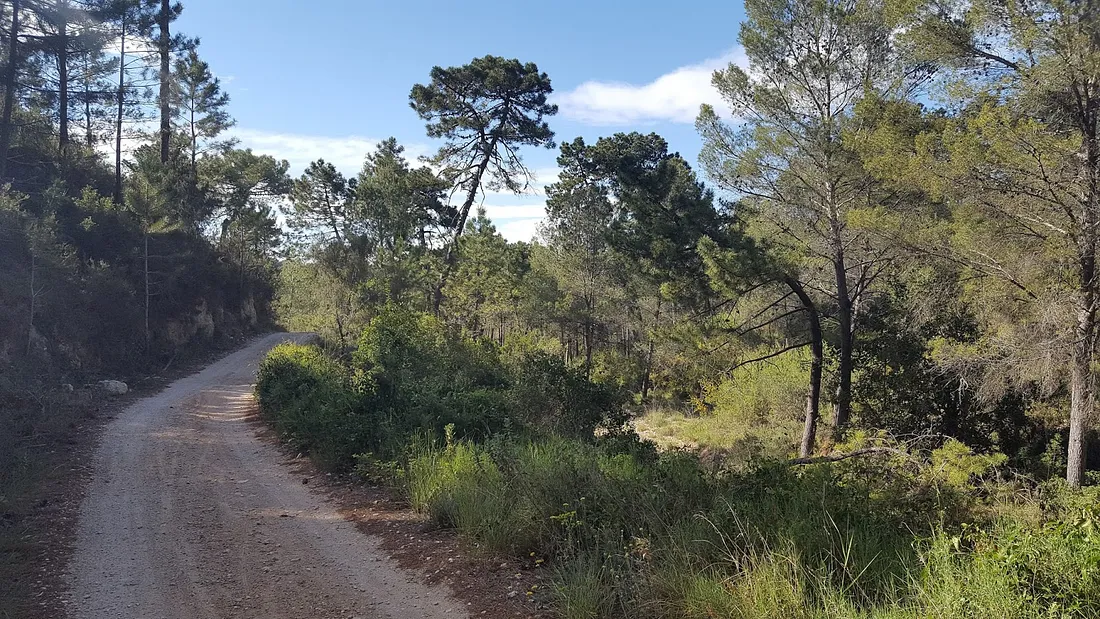
Roda la Vall cycling route

The Roda la Vall cycling route, which is a @200km, 5-stage, circular route that includes around 4700 metres of accumulated altitude gain, has been designed to enable touring cyclists to visit and discover Valencia’s Vall d’Albaida comarca over several days. The route, which passes through the centre of the village of Pinet, includes numerous off-road sections and is best suited for mountain and gravel bicycles.

== Monuments and festivities ==
=== Parish church of St. Peter the Apostle ===
The 18th-century parish church of St. Peter the Apostle has a single nave with chapels set between masonry buttresses.

=== Patron Saint festivities ===
Pinet celebrates its main festivities during the last weekend of June in honour St. Peter and the Christ of the Mountain.

=== Pinet “Llata” Festival ===
A fair held in late summer in celebration of Pinet’s traditional craft of manufacturing products from esparto and palm leaves. Includes practical demonstrations, workshops and a culinary fair with local gastronomic dishes.

== Transport ==
The only road within the municipality is the CV-608, which connects the village of Pinet with the village of Llutxent, which lies on the CV-610 regional road, joining the towns of Gandia and Xàtiva.

== Gallery ==
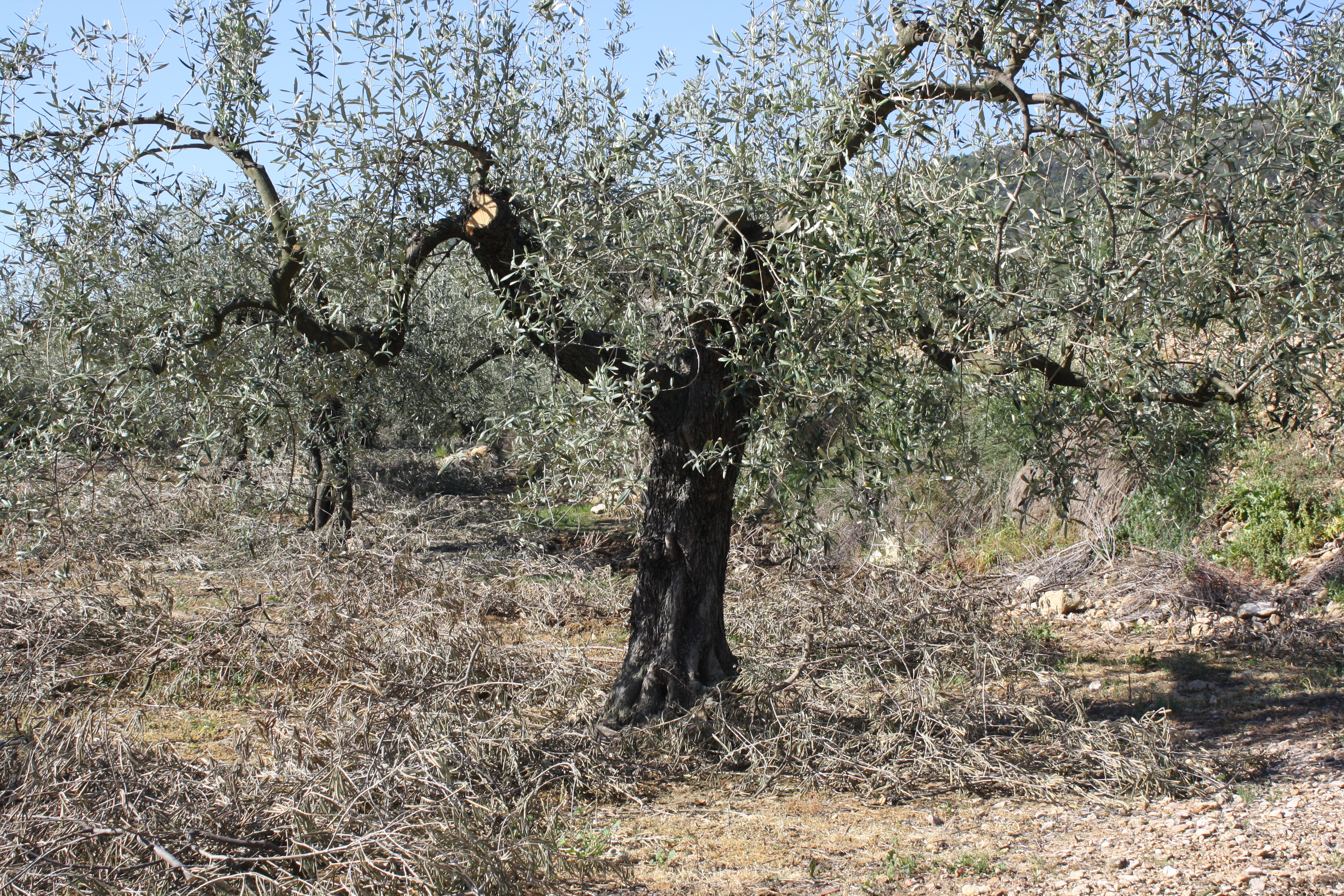
Olive tree in Pinet

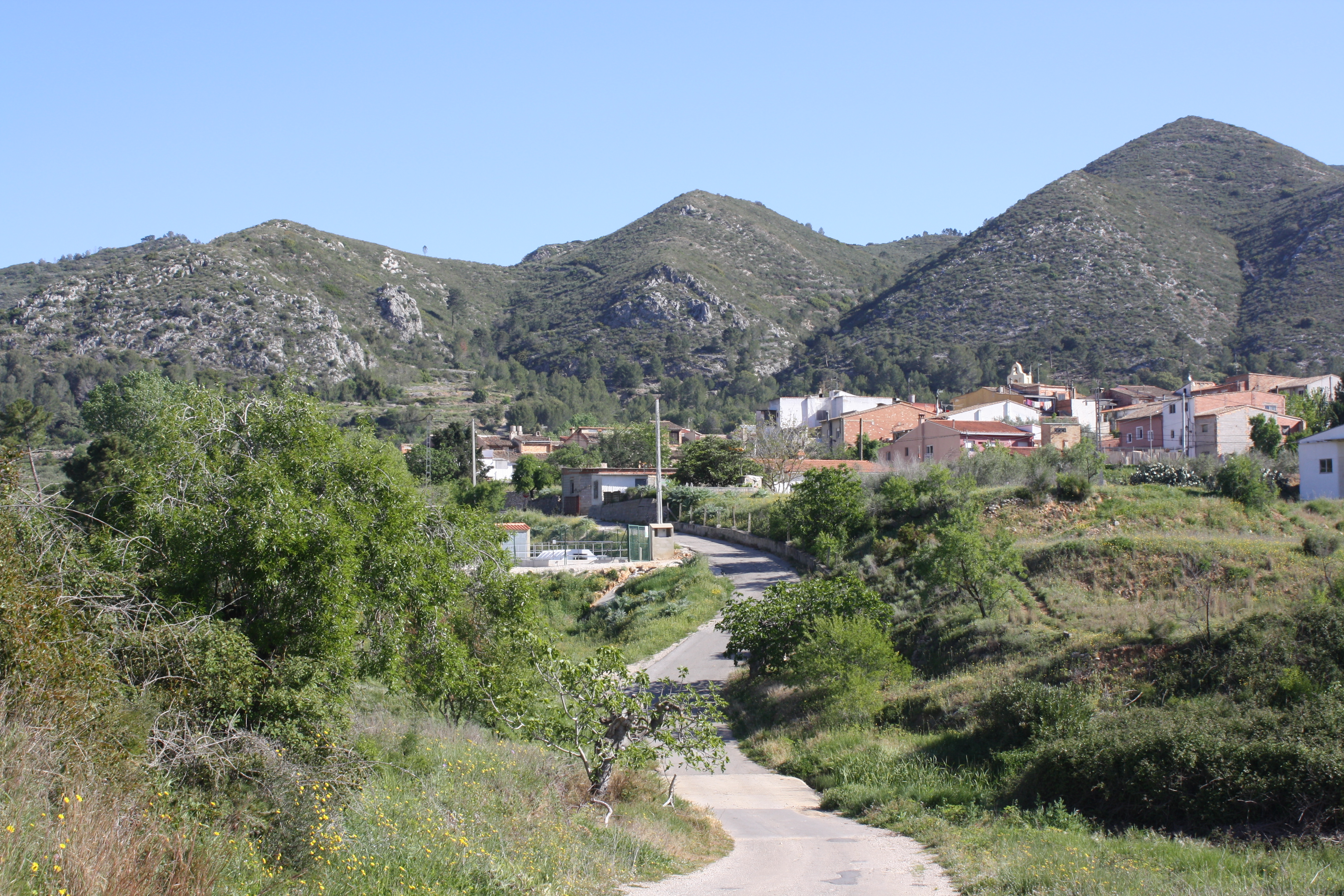
View of Pinet

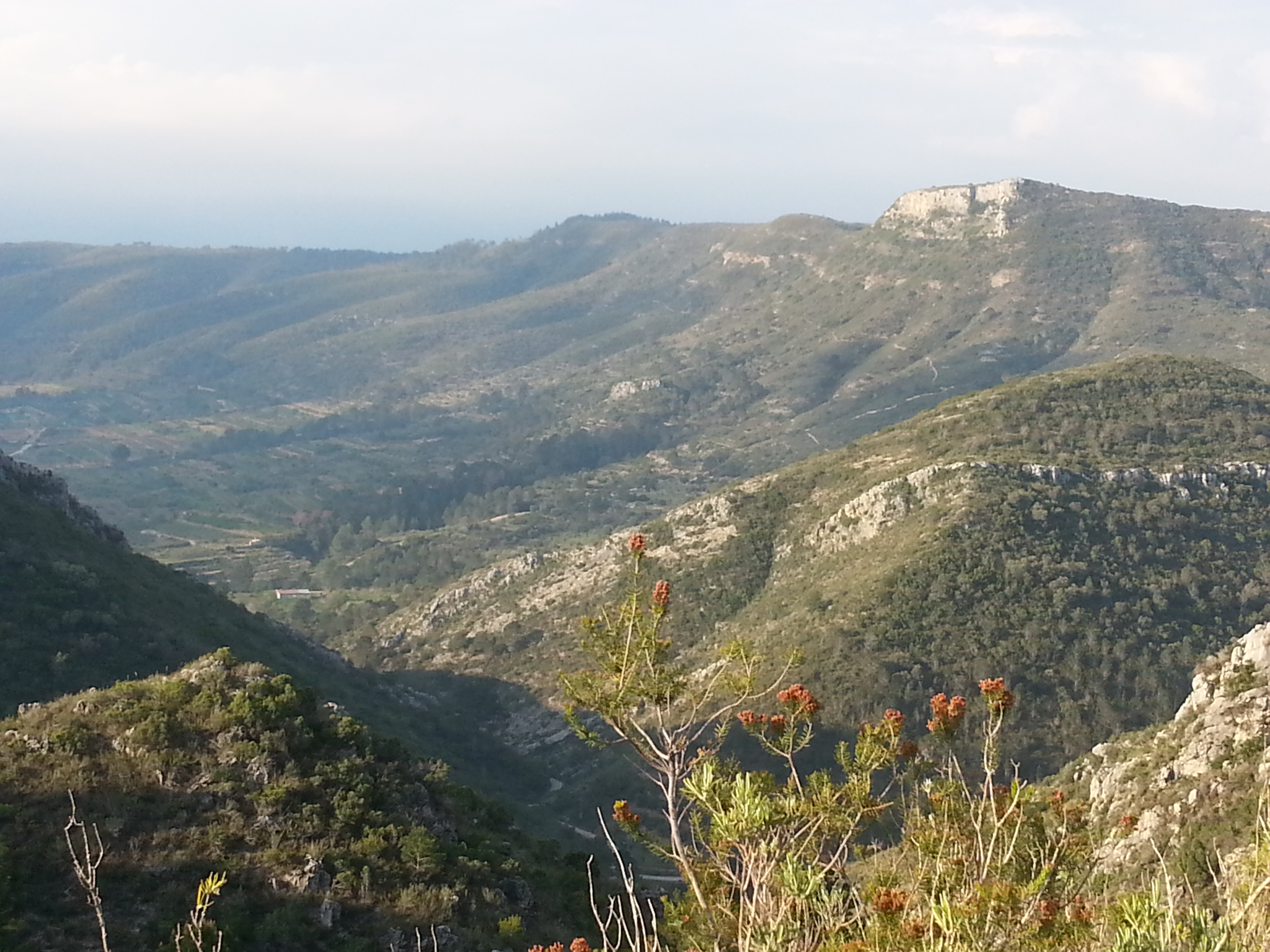
View of Pinet from El Surar

== See also ==
- Route of the Monasteries of Valencia
- El Surar
- List of municipalities in Valencia
