= Route of the Monasteries of Valencia =

Route of the Monasteries of Valencia (GR-236)
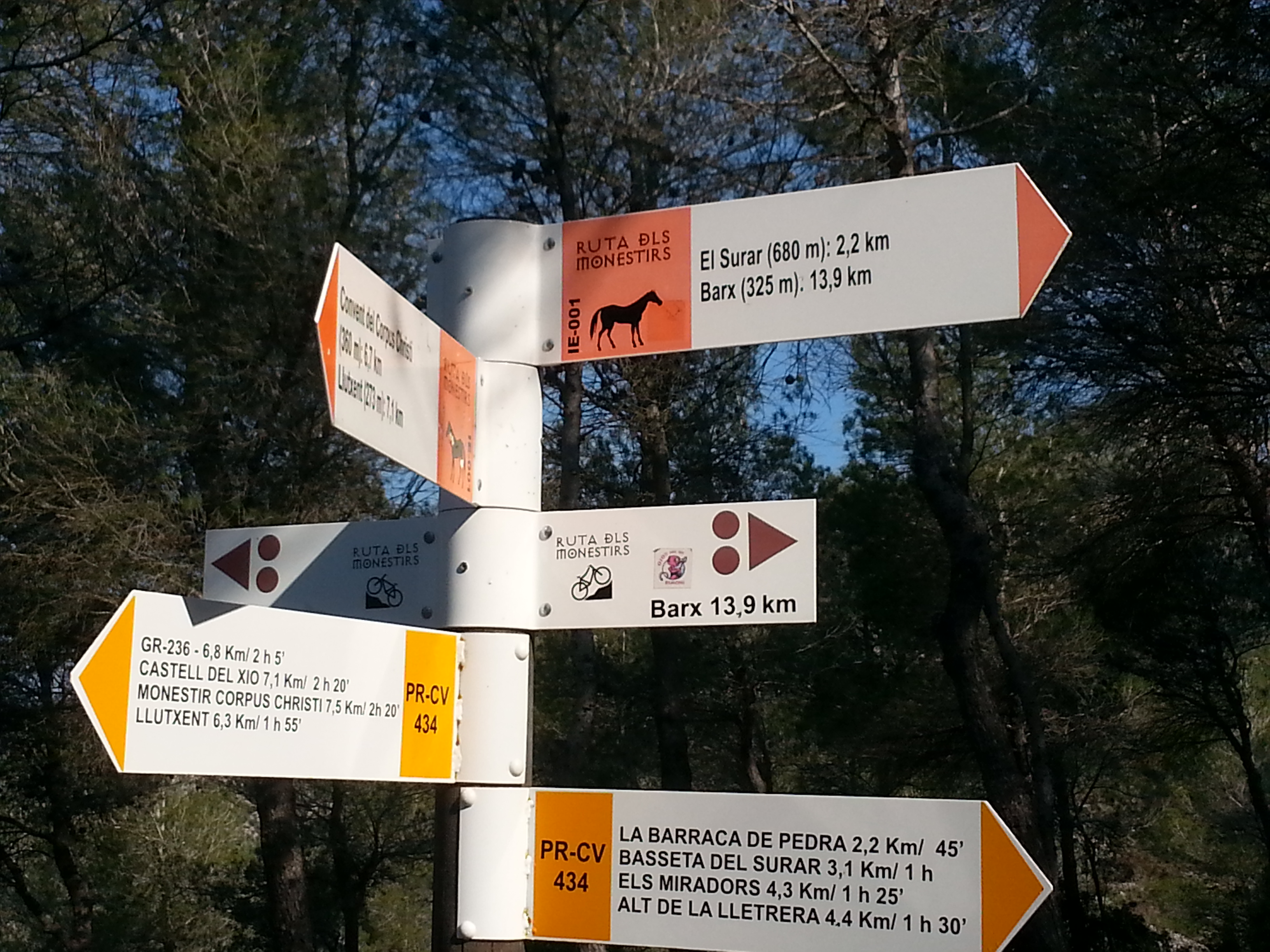
- Route of the Monasteries of Valencia
- Length: 90 km (56 mi)
- Location: Spain
- Designation: GR footpath
- Use: Hiking, Mountain biking, Equestrianism
- Difficulty: Easy
- Season: All year
- Sights: Monastery of Sant Jeroni de Cotalba; Monastery of the Corpus Christi; Monastery of Santa María de la Valldigna; Monastery of Aguas Vivas; Monastery of la Murta
- Maintainer: Generalitat Valenciana

Map of the route
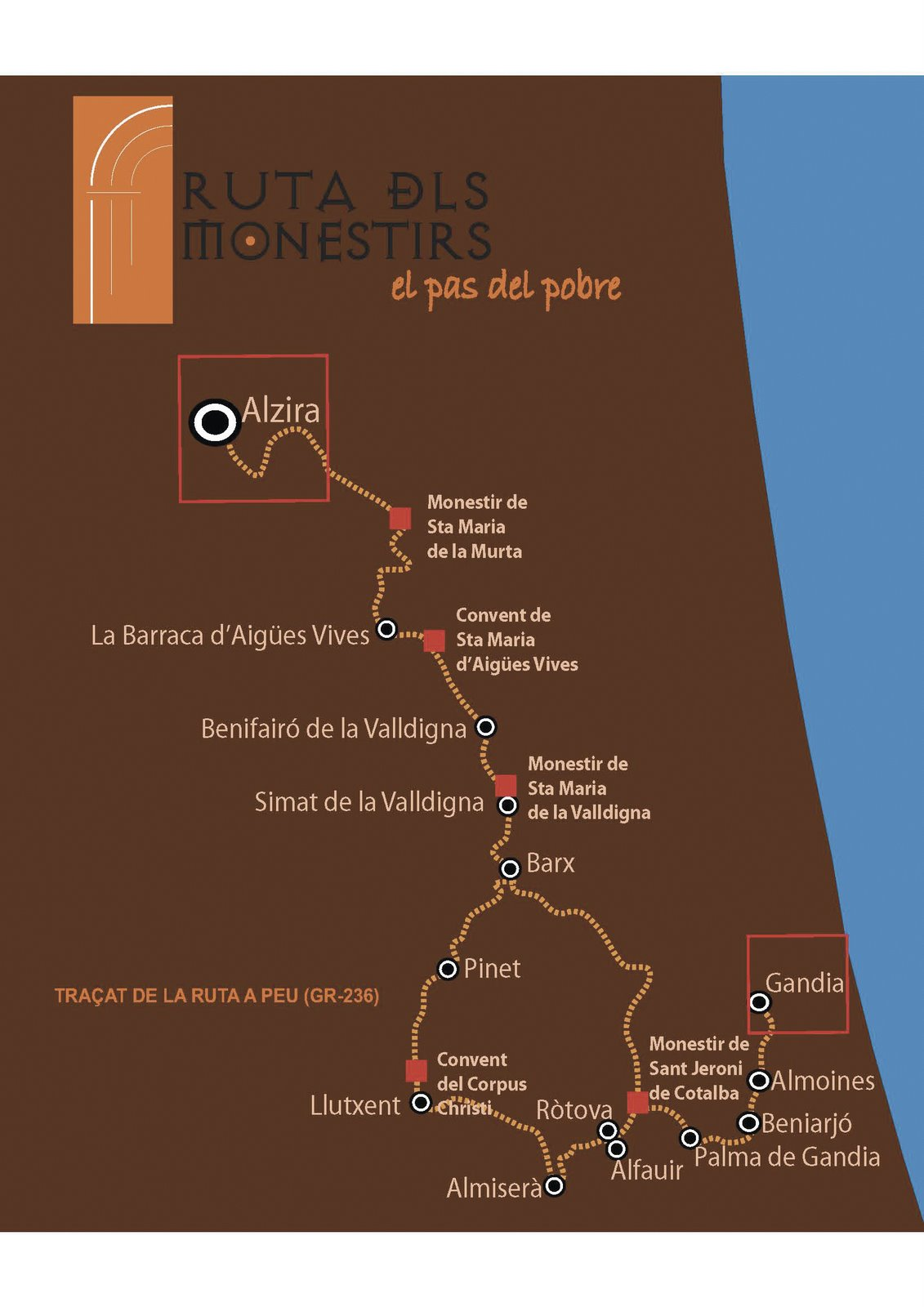

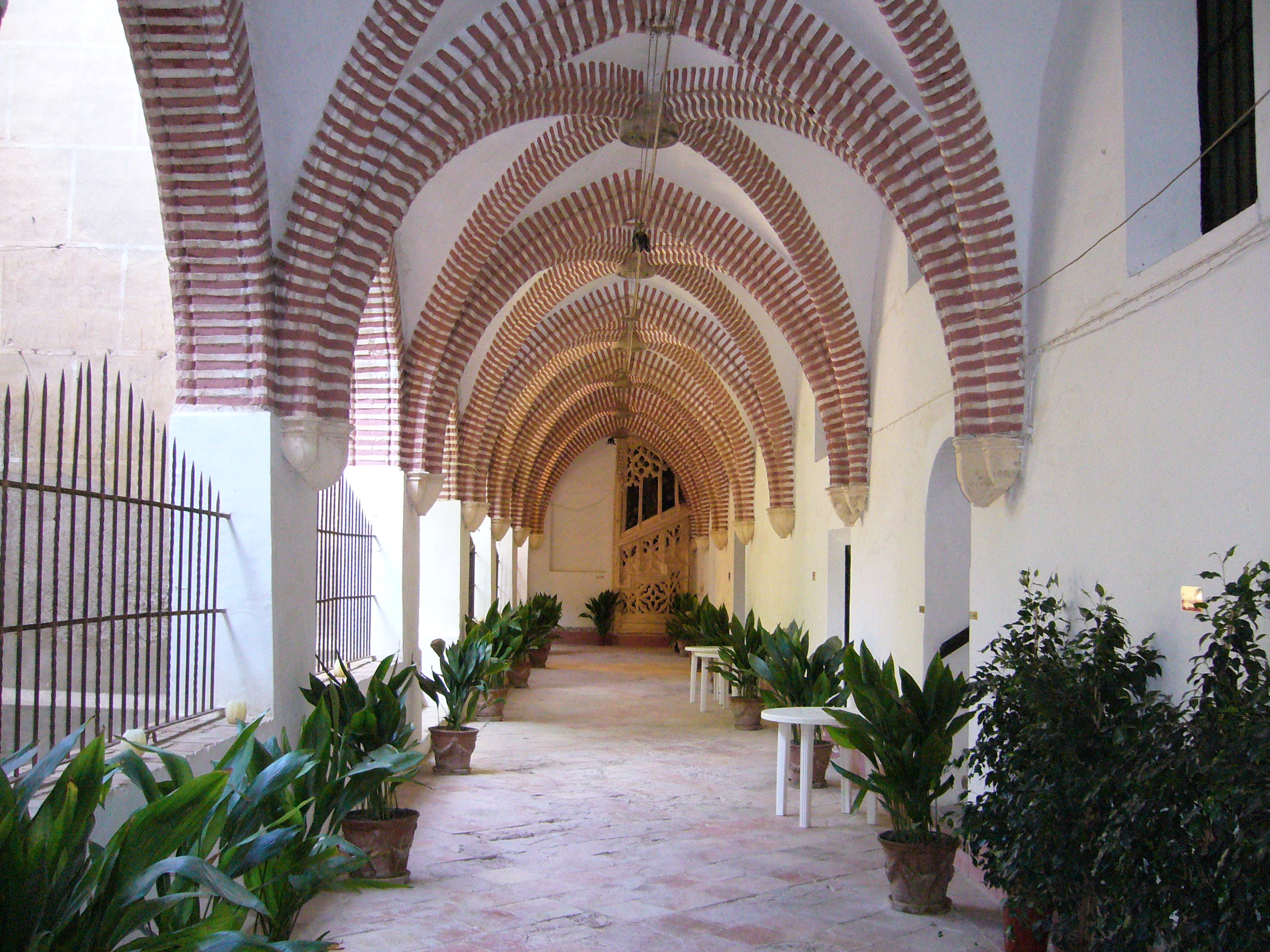
Gothic-mudéjar cloister of the Monastery of Sant Jeroni de Cotalba, in Alfauir, the beginning of the Route of the Monasteries.

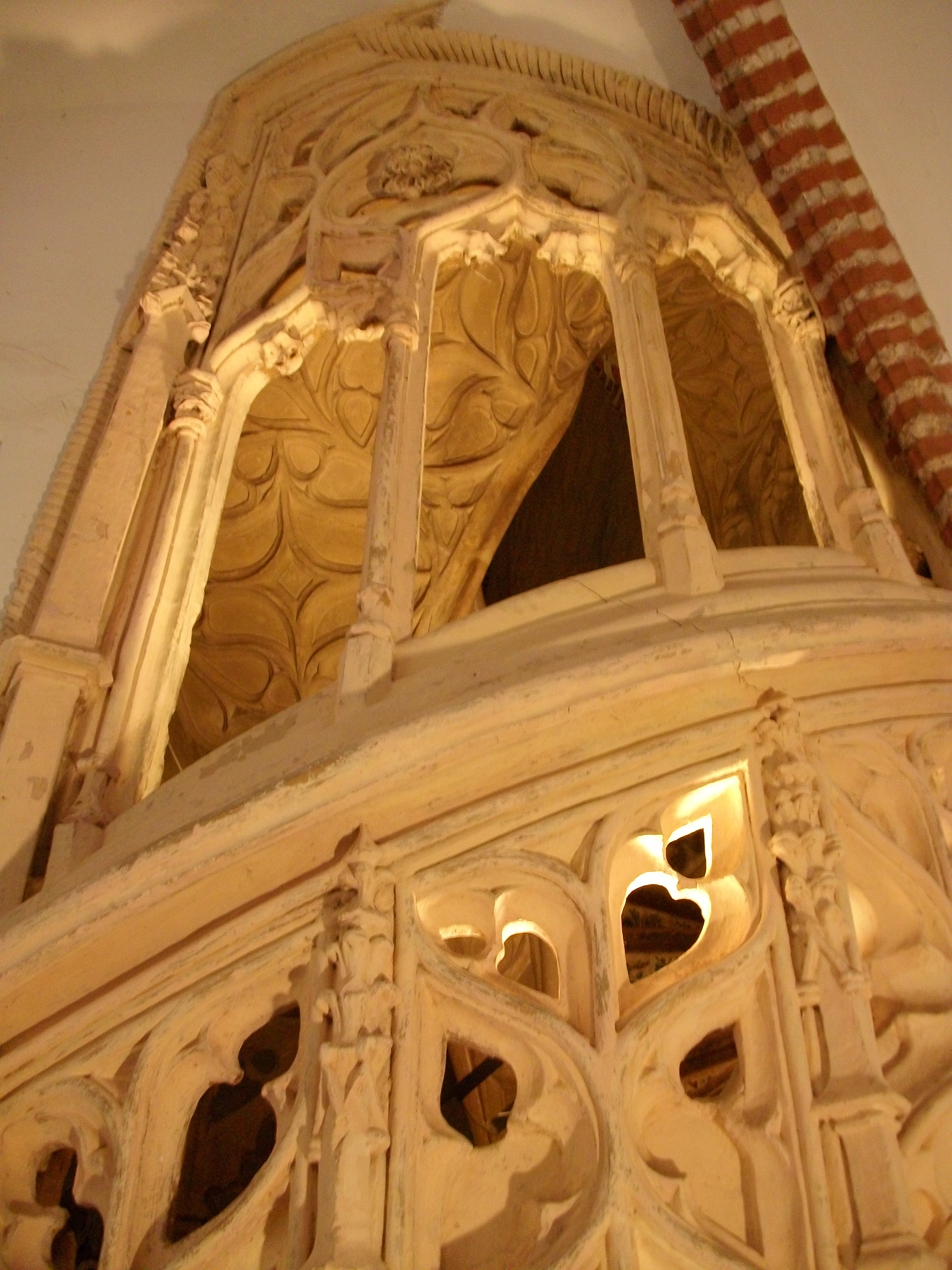
Valencian Gothic stairs in the Monastery of Sant Jeroni de Cotalba, work of Pere Compte, 15th century.

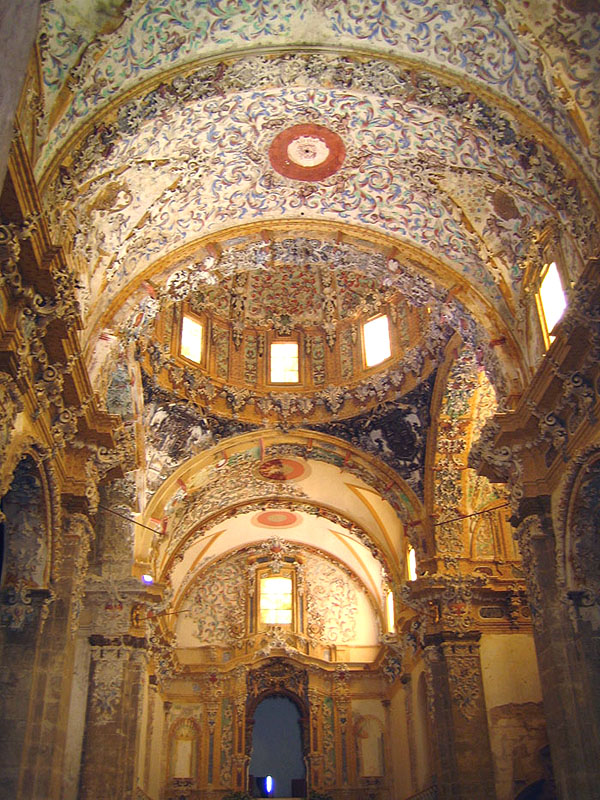
Church of the Monastery of Santa María de la Valldigna, in Simat de la Valldigna.

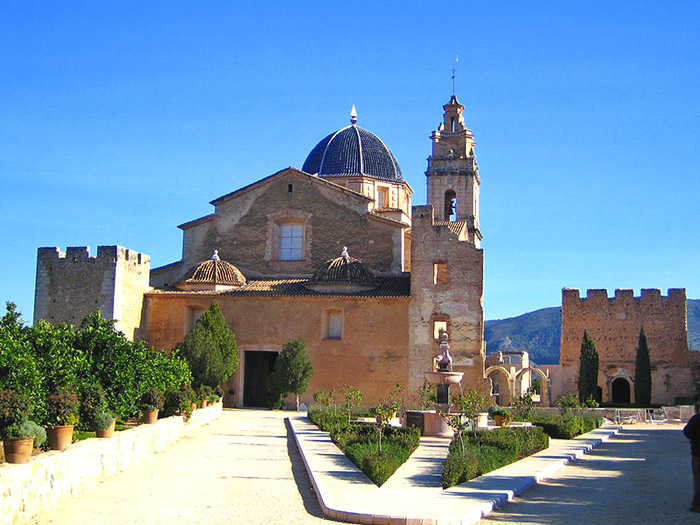
General view of the Monastery of Santa María de la Valldigna.

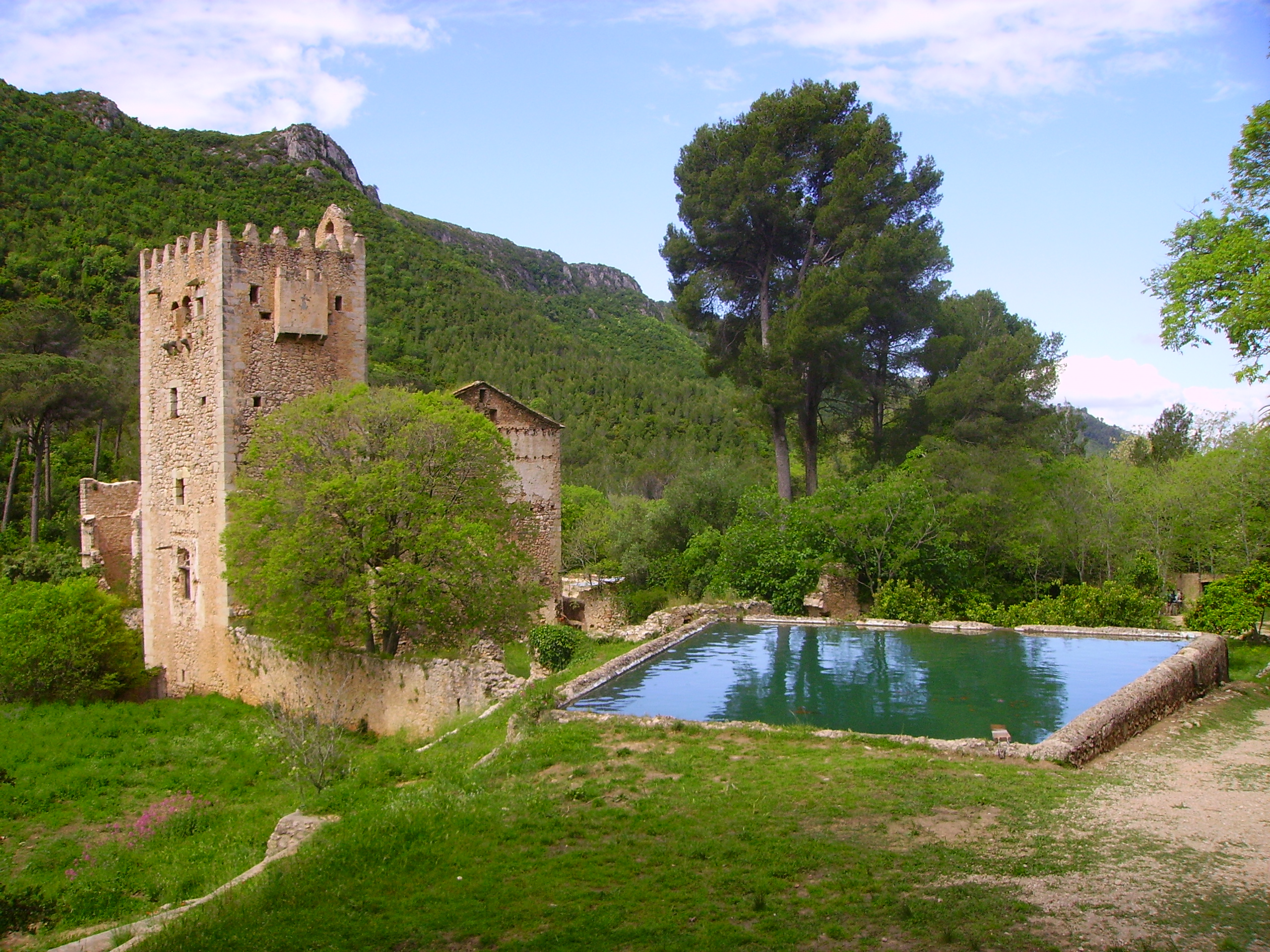
General view of the Monastery of la Murta, in Alzira.

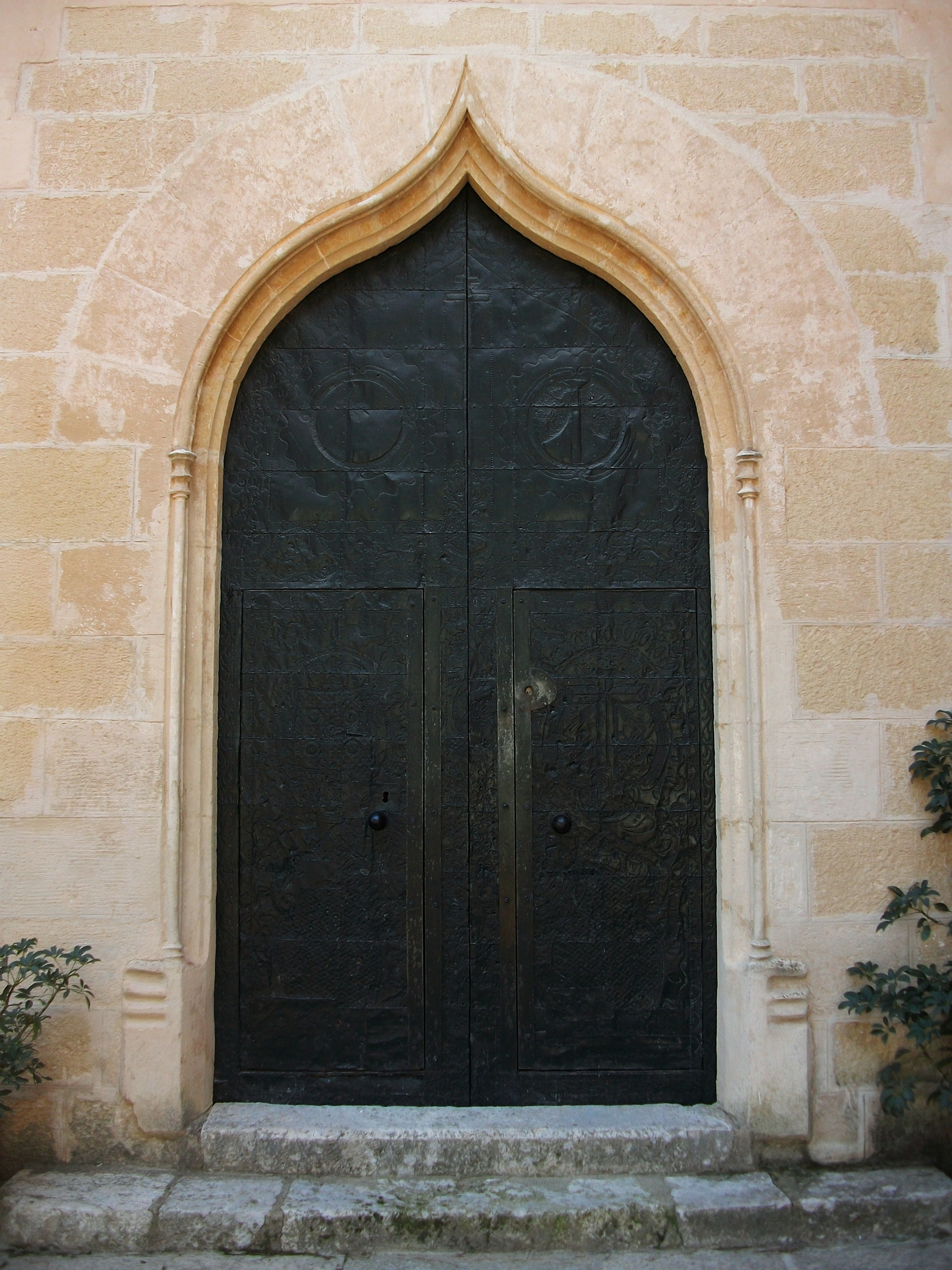
Main door of the Monastery of the Corpus Christi, in Llutxent.

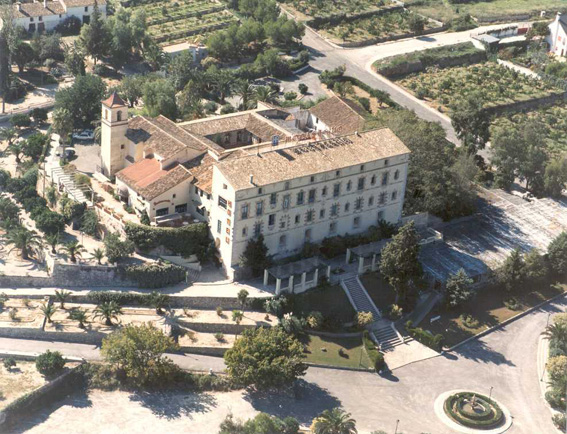
View of the Monastery of Aguas Vivas, in Carcaixent.

The Route of the Monasteries of Valencia (GR-236) is a religious and cultural route that connects five monasteries located in central region of the Province of Valencia, (Valencian Community), in Spain. The Route was inaugurated in the year 2008.

== The Monasteries ==
The route includes the following five monasteries:

- 1 Monastery of Sant Jeroni de Cotalba, in Alfauir.
- 2 Monastery of the Corpus Christi, in Llutxent.
- 3 Monastery of Santa María de la Valldigna, in Simat de la Valldigna.
- 4 Monastery of Aguas Vivas, in Carcaixent.
- 5 Monastery of la Murta, in Alzira.

== Itineraries ==
There are four distinct itineraries. The first road, for condition for hiking: the GR-236 (over 90 km in length), the second route, access to the monasteries with vehicles. The four routes are different and each one goes through different towns, but both routes pass by the five monasteries.

- On foot (GR-236).
- By car.
- Bicycle (MTB).
- By horse (IE-001).

=== Route GR-236 ===
Identifier	Denomination	Tour	Itineraries
GR-236	Route of the Monasteries of Valencia	Gandia - Almoines - Beniarjó - Beniflà - Palma de Gandia - Monastery of Sant Jeroni de Cotalba - Ròtova - Alfauir - Almiserà - Castle of Vilella - Llutxent - Monastery of the Corpus Christi - Castle of Xio - Pinet - Barx - Simat de la Valldigna - Monastery of Santa María de la Valldigna - Benifairó de la Valldigna - Monastery of Aguas Vivas - La Barraca de Aguas Vivas - Monastery of la Murta - Alzira	On foot; By car; Bicycle (MTB); By horse

==== The route on foot ====
The walk route passes through ancient medieval historical paths as the Pas del Pobre (passage of the poor), riding trails, mountain trails, old roads and railroad tracks. It starts at the train station in Gandia and ends in Alzira, to connect to public transport. The route begins in Gandia Railway Station and ends on Alzira Railway Station.

The GR-236 is the international code of the Monasteries route by foot. It is a GR (GR footpath) officially approved by the Valencian Federation of Mountain Climbing.

The GR-236 begins in Gandía and finishes in Alzira passing by these monasteries:

- 1 Monastery of Sant Jeroni de Cotalba, in Alfauir.
- 2 Monastery of the Corpus Christi, in Llutxent.
- 3 Monastery of Santa María de la Valldigna, in Simat de la Valldigna.
- 4 Monastery of Aguas Vivas, in Carcaixent.
- 5 Monastery of la Murta, in Alzira.

All the paths are signposted from the train station of Gandía all the way to Alzira. There are white and red road signs in problematic forks with location signs and direction signs, with the path code (GR-236).

There are two possible routes to follow: a main route, that takes three to four days and a shorter route that takes two to three days, since it skips out on the monastery of Corpus Christi (Llutxent).

=== The route by car ===
- 1 Monastery of the Corpus Christi
- 2 Llutxent
- 3 Benicolet
- 4 Monastery of Sant Jeroni de Cotalba
- 5 Gandia
- 6 Marxuquera
- 7 La Drova
- 8 Barx
- 9 Simat de la Valldigna
- 10 Monastery of Santa Maria de la Valldigna
- 11 Monastery of Aguas Vivas
- 12 La Barraca d'Aigües Vives
- 13 Alzira
- 14 Monastery of la Murta

=== The route by bicycle (MTB) ===
The itinerary by bicycle (MTB) is a circular route of 123 km which starts and ends in Alzira and which crosses the central regions of La Safor, la Vall d'Albaida and La Ribera Alta. The itinerary has a specific signaling and a special path adapted to mountain bike.

=== The route by horse IE-001 ===
The itinerary by horse has a specific signaling and a special path adapted to horses and homologated by the Royal Spanish Equestrian Federation (RFHE) and their code is IE-001. It is the first route in Spain and the second in Europe to be approved as equestrian route. The itinerary starts in the Monastery of Sant Jeroni de Cotalba, near Gandia.

== Credentials ==
It's possible to collect a card in the Tourist Office of Gandia which credited the pilgrims passing through the various monasteries and towns.

== Tourist Info ==
- Tourist Info Gandia

Avda. Marques de Campo s/n 46701 Gandia (Valencia) Ph 96 287 77 88 www.visitgandia.com

- Tourist Info Ròtova

Plaza Mayor 7 - 46725 Rotova (Valencia) Ph 96 283 53 16

- Tourist Info Tavernes de la Valldigna

Avda. Marina s/n 46760 Tavernes de la Valldigna (Valencia) Ph 96 288 52 64 www.valldignaturisme.org

- Tourist Info Alzira

Pl. del Reino 46600 Alzira (Valencia) Ph 96 241 95 51 www.alzira.es

- Tourist Info Simat de la Valldigna

Passeig 9 de Octubre, s/n 46750 Simat de la Valldigna (Valencia) Ph 96 281 09 20

== Bibliography ==
- Bernat Montagud Piera. "Monasterios Valencianos". Generalitat Valenciana, Conselleria de Cultura, Educació i Ciència. Rutes d'aproximació al patrimoni cultural valencià, Volumen nº 3. 1984. ISBN 8475790224
- María Desamparados Cabanes Pecourt. Los monasterios valencianos. University of Valencia. Facultad de Filosofía y Letras, Departamento de Historia Medieval. 1974. ISBN 8460060365
- Carlos Sarthou Carreres. "Monasterios Valencianos: su historia y su arte". La Semana Gráfica, Valencia, 1943.

== See also ==
- Monastery of Sant Jeroni de Cotalba
- Route of the Borgias
- PR-CV 100 (Route of the Monastery of Sant Jeroni de Cotalba)
- Route of the Castles of Vinalopó
- GR-160
