= Carcaixent =

Carcaixent Carcaixent (Valencian) Carcagente (Spanish)
- Municipality
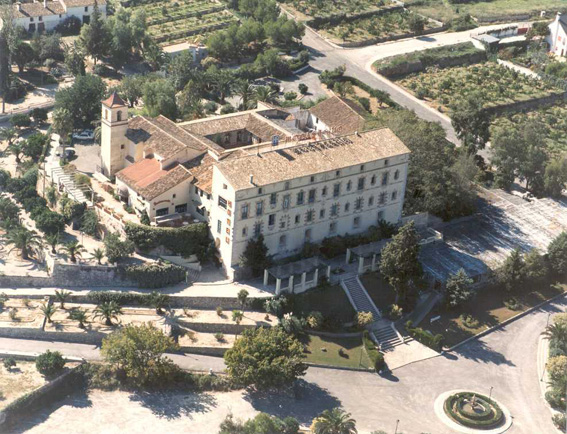

- Flag Coat of arms

- Location in Spain Carcaixent (Valencian Community) Carcaixent (Spain)
- Coordinates: 39°7′20″N 0°26′56″W
- Country: Spain
- Autonomous community: Valencian Community
- Province: Valencia
- Comarca: Ribera Alta
- Judicial district: Alzira

Government
  - Mayor: Carolina Almiñana (2023) (PPCV)

Area
  - Total: 59.3 km^{2} (22.9 sq mi)
- Elevation: 21 m (69 ft)

Population (2025-01-01)
  - Total: 21,934
  - Density: 370/km^{2} (958/sq mi)
- Demonym(s): Carcaixentí, carcaixentina
- Time zone: UTC+1 (CET)
  - Summer (DST): UTC+2 (CEST)
- Postal code: 46740
- Official language(s): Valencian and Spanish
- Website: Official website

Carcaixent (Valencian: [kaɾkajˈʃent]; Spanish: Carcagente [kaɾkaˈxente]) is a town and municipality in the province of Valencia, eastern Spain, with c. 22,000 inhabitants. Its origins go back to prehistoric Iberian and Roman times, with some remainders in its area. It is located in the Ribera Alta comarca, 40 km south of the provincial capital Valencia. It is the birthplace of the orange growth and its flourishing commerce in the 19th and 20th centuries. Currently, its inhabitants live basically on agriculture and the service sector.

== Carcaixent, in the heart of the Ribera Alta ==
Remains of Neolithic, Iberian and Roman settlements have been found in the area of Carcaixent, although the municipality actually originated from a Muslim farmhouse. King Philip II awarded Carcaixent the title of University in 1576. After upgrading it to Villa Real, the king issued Royal Privileges granting it the right to vote in the Courts of Valencia. Economy and population boomed in Carcaixent in the 18th century thanks to the sound production of silk, although crops were replaced by orange trees in the late 18th and early 19th centuries. Carcaixent was awarded the title of city in 1916.

== Main sights ==
- Monastery of Aguas Vivas: The construction that has come until nowadays, answers to the buildings from 16th and 17th centuries, the cloister, the new church, the sacristy and the bell tower. The complete work reflects a solid construction in the center of which the empty space of the courtyard in which over the years, some remains have been annexed. The church of the convent, facing the south, was built in 1724.
- Hermitage of Sant Roc de Ternils: Firstly, the chape was dedicated to St. Bartholomew, built during the reconquest following the guidelines to maximize the space for the congregation of the faithful people. It is a construction with a single nave, with a plane front, open chapels between the buttresses and diaphragmed arches which holds the double-sloped roof made of Areabic tile. Inside, the only existing decoration is composed by paints in the joists with geometric shapes and rhombus with red and yellow stripes.
- Magatzem de Ribera: It is a big warehouse built in the early 20th century. It was conceived as an orange store. In 1989, the Town Hall acquired the building. These functional requirements needed premises which main feature was the necessity of space and the width without being necessary the complex structures for the installation of machinery or elements generating energy. Another of the characteristics is its location. The exact date of the building of the store is not known, but it should have been built between 1900 and 1910.
- Hort de Soriano is one of the most emblematic spots on Carcaixent’s agricultural and traditional landscape. Established over one hundred years ago, it contributed to increasing the value of certain rain-fed farmlands, where wells were dug out to introduce orange farming. The site was purchased by Carcaixent Council in 1991 and declared a municipal natural site to ensure its protection and tourist promotion. Among the range of facilities and leisure activities available at Carcaixent’s Hort de Soriano, there is a caravan area, a leisure area and a picnic area, spreading out over 6.8 hectares, a play area, and sport area. There are several panels with information on four walking routes and a nature centre, with educational and environmental interpretation facilities.

== Birthplace of the orange ==
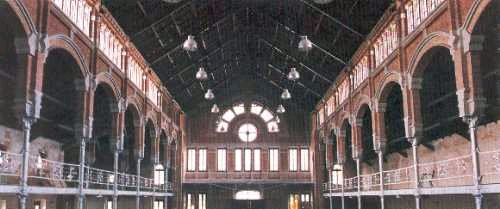
Magatzem de Ribera, warehouse conceived as an orange store

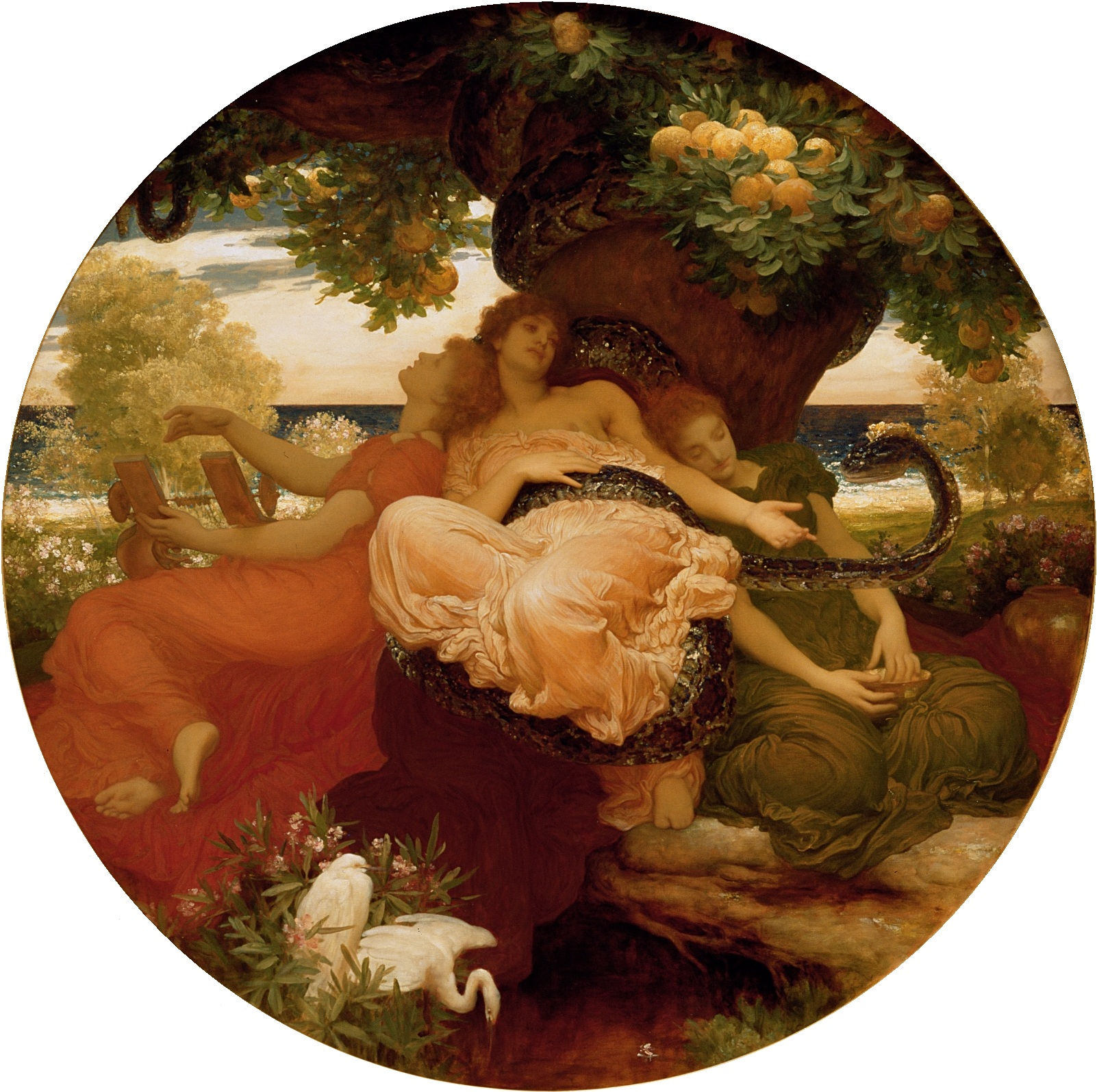
The Garden of the Hesperides by Frederick, Lord Leighton, 1892.

The orange is the fruit made from Spain, through Valencia, and spreading throughout the rest of the world. In Greek mythology the Garden of the Hesperides is a mythological grove where apples grew tended to by nymphs and a dragon. Hercules, the hero of classical literature, killed the guardian, entered the garden and plucked those golden apples –In later years it was thought that the "golden apples" might have actually been oranges, a fruit unknown to Europe before the Middle Ages. Several scholars defend that the etymology of the word comes from the Sanskrit term narang and the Persian word narensh. When Arabs brought orange farming to the Iberian Peninsula, they called the fruits naranjah. The Region of Valencia maintained the orange-farming tradition after the Arabic period, with references to orange trees in the city of Valencia dating back to the 14th century. In fact, there is an Orange Courtyard inside Valencia’s 15th-century Silk Exchange market (La Llotja de la Seda), a UNESCO World Heritage Site. The first references to commercial orange plantations date back to the 18th century.

According to the historical records, in 1781 parish priest Vicente Monzó and two acquaintances, notary and scribe Carlo Maseres and pharmacist Jacinto Bodí, planted the first fields of orange trees in the municipal area of Carcaixent known as Les Basses del Rey. The trees thrived in the land, favoured by the benign Mediterranean climate, and adapted perfectly to Valencian soil both on rain-fed farmland and irrigated land fed by river Júcar, whose extensive irrigation channel distributed fertile water around the whole of the Ribera Alta. In the early 19th century, orange trees gradually started to replace other crops, such as rice, cereal and mulberries, taking over as the main local crop. Wholesale exports of oranges commenced in this century, fuelled by the arrival of the railway that connected Valencia, Xàtiva, Algemesí, La Pobla Llarga, Alzira and Carcaixent (1853). The rail line from Carcaixent to Gandía and Dénia that opened in 1864 continued to operate until the early 1970s. The Carcaixent-Dénia line was one of the oldest narrow rail tracks in mainland Spain.

=== Orange route ===
Carcaixent has developed the Orange route to introduce national and foreign visitors to this interesting and celebrated agricultural, commercial and cultural legacy. The project analyses the history of the fruit, providing information on its origins and on the municipality of Carcaixent’s standing as the birthplace of oranges. Visitors will also learn about parish priest Monzó’s pioneer action, and the different architectural styles used in the construction of orange warehouses from antiquity to present times. The itinerary analyses how oranges have been handled and marketed from the late 18th century to the present.

== Climate ==
Carcaixent has a hot summer mediterranean climate (Csa in the Köppen climate classification) with mild, moderately wet winters and hot, dry summers. The rainiest season of the year is autumn, due to the cold drop episodes that are more common during the months of September, October and November. On 15 May 2015, Carcaixent recorded the highest temperature ever recorded in Spain and Europe for a month of May, which was 44.4 °C (111.9 °F).

Climate data for Carcaixent (2009-2025), extremes (2008-present)
Month	Jan	Feb	Mar	Apr	May	Jun	Jul	Aug	Sep	Oct	Nov	Dec	Year
Record high °C (°F)	29.5 (85.1)	28.4 (83.1)	32.5 (90.5)	37.5 (99.5)	44.4 (111.9)	41.6 (106.9)	44.2 (111.6)	46.4 (115.5)	39.5 (103.1)	35.7 (96.3)	32.7 (90.9)	26.9 (80.4)	46.4 (115.5)
Mean daily maximum °C (°F)	17.3 (63.1)	18.4 (65.1)	20.4 (68.7)	23.1 (73.6)	27.3 (81.1)	31.4 (88.5)	34.1 (93.4)	34.2 (93.6)	30.2 (86.4)	26.4 (79.5)	20.9 (69.6)	18.0 (64.4)	25.1 (77.3)
Daily mean °C (°F)	11.0 (51.8)	11.8 (53.2)	13.8 (56.8)	16.3 (61.3)	20.1 (68.2)	24.3 (75.7)	27.3 (81.1)	27.6 (81.7)	24.0 (75.2)	20.2 (68.4)	15.0 (59.0)	12.0 (53.6)	18.6 (65.5)
Mean daily minimum °C (°F)	4.7 (40.5)	5.1 (41.2)	7.1 (44.8)	9.5 (49.1)	12.8 (55.0)	17.1 (62.8)	20.5 (68.9)	21.0 (69.8)	17.7 (63.9)	14.0 (57.2)	9.0 (48.2)	6.0 (42.8)	12.0 (53.7)
Record low °C (°F)	−4.8 (23.4)	−6.5 (20.3)	−2.1 (28.2)	0.6 (33.1)	5.4 (41.7)	9.7 (49.5)	14.0 (57.2)	13.3 (55.9)	9.9 (49.8)	3.7 (38.7)	−0.5 (31.1)	−4.2 (24.4)	−6.5 (20.3)
Average precipitation mm (inches)	68.9 (2.71)	32.9 (1.30)	115.0 (4.53)	57.7 (2.27)	32.9 (1.30)	18.9 (0.74)	9.7 (0.38)	18.6 (0.73)	92.9 (3.66)	77.6 (3.06)	103.2 (4.06)	72.9 (2.87)	701.2 (27.61)
Source: Agencia Estatal de Meteorologia

== See also ==
- Route of the Monasteries of Valencia
- List of municipalities in Valencia
