= Monastery of Aguas Vivas =

- Monasteri d'Aigües Vives
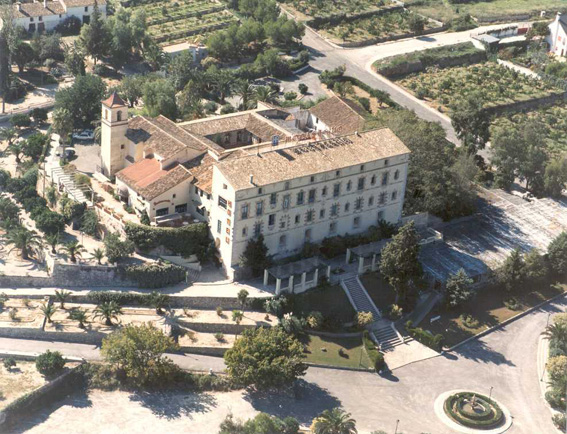

- Location within Spain

Monastery information
- Full name: Royal Monastery of Santa María de Aguas Vivas
- Established: 13th century
- Diocese: Valencia

Site
- Location: Carcaixent (Valencia)
- Coordinates: 39°5′21.35″N 0°21′16.67″W
- Visible remains: Restored
- Public access: Yes

The Monastery of Santa María de Aguas Vivas, located in the municipality of Carcaixent (Valencia), Spain, is a religious building dating back to the 13th century.

== History ==
The current building was built during the 16th and 17th centuries with gothic and baroque styles, while the North wing was finished in the 18th century. The monastery belonged to the order of the Augustinians, guarded the image of the Virgin of Aguas Vivas, patron saint of the city of Carcaixent. In the middle of the 19th century as a result of the Ecclesiastical Confiscations of Mendizábal, the monks had to leave the convent, which became the property of the barons of Casanova, aiming at rural housing. In 1977 the monastery was acquired and refurbished to destine it to hotel residence by Antonio Vidal Bellver (photographer and entrepreneur of Carcaixent). Today is owned by a known businessman of Gandia.

== Architecture ==
Throughout the 16th and 17th centuries the current monumental structure of the convent was configured. Francisco Colom, Valencian architect, led an expansion of the monastery, particularly of the cloister in 1597.

New works are dated in 1633, in 1695, when he is plotted and boost the new church with area, sacristy, altarpiece and Bell, Tower by Browning some altars. The building is articulated around the cloister which are the Church to the South, the whole of the farm to the North and large rectangular body of five plants that dominates the whole, towards the road of Alzira to Tavernes de la Valldigna to the East. To the West lies the Bell Tower, the Church, the doorway of access to the cloister and the farm buildings. The cloister of reduced proportions is rich in size and decorated with frescos. In the Center there is a cistern. To the left of the cloister is the refectory, and in parallel to the same kitchen. The Bell Tower shows a long vertical body with unique attachment of a sundial. A double and terse molding gives way to the body of campaigns with vertical Windows with semicircular arch. Gabled in Arabic tiles cover topped with iron weathervane.

The façade of the Church accused the roof gable of the same as well as covers of the buttresses sheds. The access door is semi-circular with a cloth of ceramics representing Nuestra Señora de Aguas Vivas. The facade of the cloister framing a doorway arch lowered with nobiliary coat of arms, flanked by two rectangular windows. On the top floor are two large Windows and a balcony. Attached to these bodies lies a body of several units to the farm with structures from different periods. The facade this corresponding to the great body that spatially dominates the set, has a wide verticality. A long access staircase, dates back to the high embankment. In this stone podium made of buttress and builds and strengthens the structure of the work. On the podium six windows, open with pictorial simulation of ashlars in lintels and buttresses. The last body, topped by a cornice shelters several paintings, among them flanked by registration year 1767, the Virgin of Aguas Vivas. Between windows, ornamental pictorial elements are displayed. The cover is a shed and Arabic tiles. To the south facade tower falls Bell Tower, the aisle of the temple and an adjoining building, the primitive sacristy and the flank of the body towards the facade. The north facade corresponds to the different constructions of the farmhouse.

The Church has one nave and in it there is besides the altar six side chapels. The presbytery has two doors, one that gives access to the cloister and another that linked to the old sacristy converted into a winery. The Church has high choir with semicircular railing and choir stalls by two seasons: 15th century, gothic and other plateresque. The temple dome is Canon.

== See also ==
- Route of the Monasteries of Valencia
