= Monastery of the Corpus Christi (Llutxent) =

Monastery in Llutxent, Spain

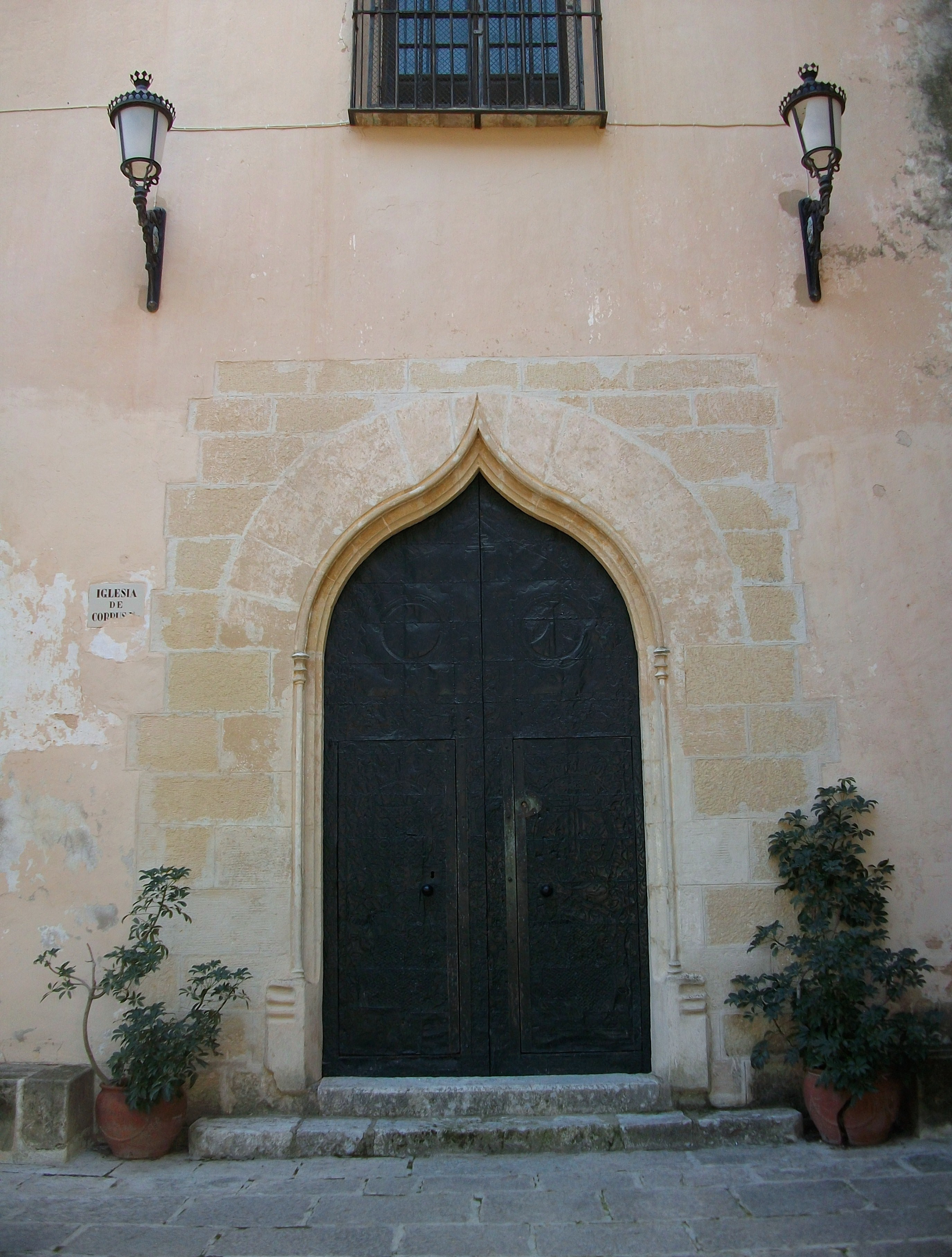

- Location within Spain
- Interactive map of Monastery of the Corpus Christi

Monastery information
- Full name: Monastery of the Corpus Christi
- Established: 13th century
- Diocese: Valencia

Site
- Location: Llutxent, (Valencia)
- Coordinates: 38°57′8.73″N 0°21′18.99″W
- Visible remains: Restored
- Public access: Yes

The Monastery of the Corpus Christi is located in the municipality of Llutxent (Valencia), Spain. The convent building has its origins in an hermitage of the 13th century and was renovated in the 18th century. This monastery presents buildings from different eras, beginning the edification in the 14th century.

The construction of this monastery is linked to the miracle of the Corporals which, according to tradition, took place here in the 13th century.

The set is ordered through a cloister, whose south side inside the classroom, the cells and the refectory. The cloister of square ground plan consists of two bodies, the lower with arches on pilasters with capitals decorated with Eucharistic motifs. The Church of Corpus Christi is located on the north side of the cloister of the monastery. It is a church with a nave divided into four sections with high choir at the foot. It is covered with vaults and Vault crashed on the High Choir. On the side of the epistle, it presents two adjoining chapels in the 18th century, the chapel of the Holy face and Chapel communion this last of greek cross with a dome on pendentives.

The construction of the church is made with masonry walls and stalls in the buttresses and corners. Eastward of the set is the courtyard of services around which distributed the different rooms for the operation of the monastery.

== See also ==
- Route of the Monasteries of Valencia
