= Llutxent =

- Municipality of Spain
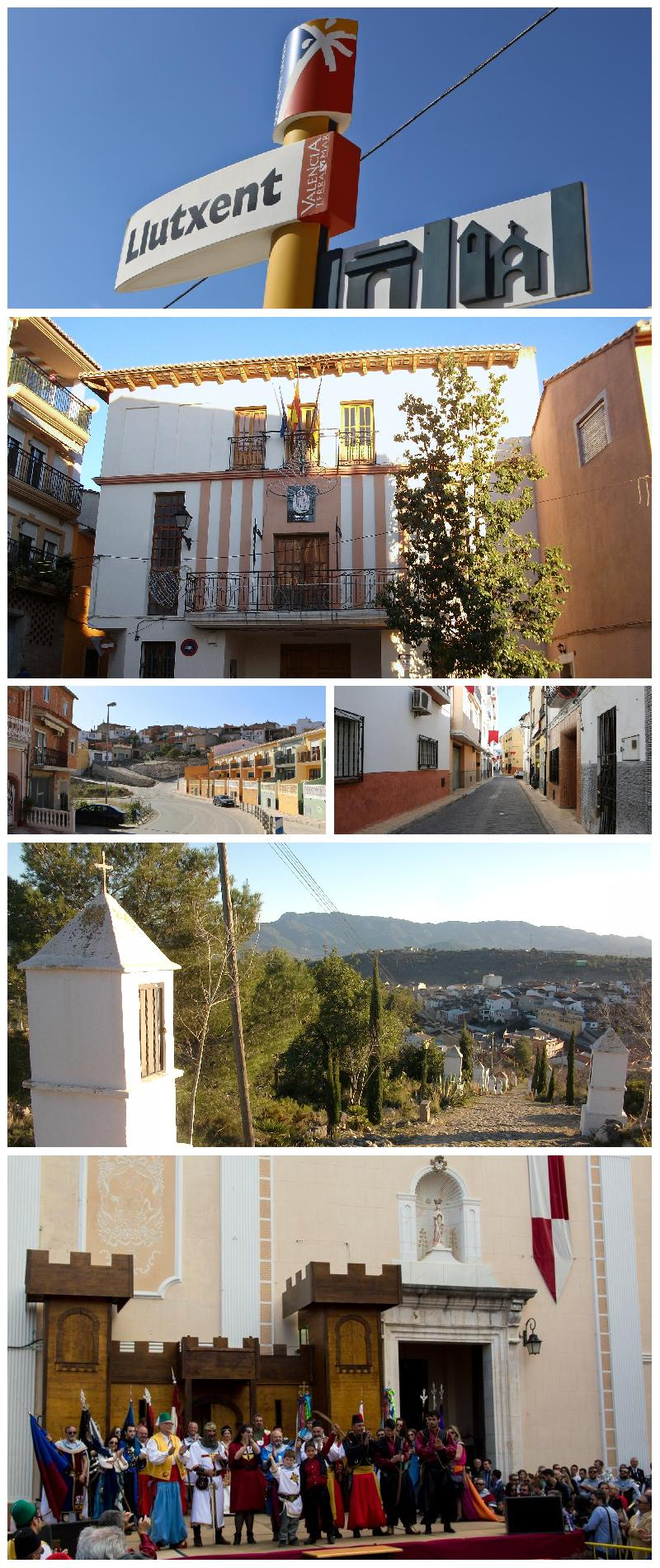
- Clockwise: Llutxent's info-sign, Town hall building, Del Mig Street, View from top of The Coast, Town's Main Square during Moors and Christians, Montsant avenue

- Coat of arms
- Nickname: Llutx
- Location of Llutxent Llutxent (Valencian Community) Llutxent (Europe)
- Coordinates: 38°56′33″N 0°21′23″W
- Country: Spain
- Autonomous community: Valencian Community
- Province: Valencia
- Comarca: Vall d'Albaida
- Judicial district: Ontinyent

Government
  - Alcalde: Pep Estornell Català (Unity for Llutxent)

Area
  - Total: 40.1 km^{2} (15.5 sq mi)
- Elevation: 280 m (920 ft)

Population (2025-01-01)
  - Total: 2,314
  - Density: 57.7/km^{2} (149/sq mi)
- Demonym(s): Llutxentine llutxentí, -ina (va)
- Time zone: UTC+1 (CET)
  - Summer (DST): UTC+2 (CEST)
- Postal code: 46838
- Official languages: Valencian and Spanish
- Website: Official website

Llutxent (Valencian pronunciation: [ʎuˈtʃent]) is a town located in the eastern part of Spain, in the Valencian Community, within the comarca of the Vall d'Albaida, 80 km south of Valencia and 110 km north of Alicante. As of 2016, it is inhabited by 2,402 people.

The town's economy is based on agriculture, construction, transport and the manufacture of pallets, and a small services sector.

The town was first settled by Ancient Romans.

Llutxent is host to one of the most popular Moors and Christians celebrations during the end of April, attracting many people around the Valencian Community to see the festival.

== Name ==
The town derives its name from the Latin etymon Luciana villa or pagu Lucianu, meaning "Light Villa" or "Pagus of Light".

Some other sources suggest that the town may have been named after the Roman Patronymic Lucius with the ending in. The town was also known as Luxen, Luchent, and Llutchen in the past.

Llutxent is commonly abbreviated to Llutx.

== History ==
=== Roman period ===
The origin of the earliest settlement at the site of present-day Llutxent was by the Romans, in the form of Roman Villa.

The town's name comes from this early settlement. However, no ruins of Roman Origin have been found.

=== Muslim rule (711–1492) ===
Little is known about the Islamic Period in Llutxent.

The town's area was made up of a large number of farmsteads (with names such as Benicia, Benitxellví, Xetà, Rafal, Osset, Cometa which are still used to indicate the areas where those farmsteads used to be) that depended upon the Castle of Xiu.

=== Christian reconquest (1229–1245) ===
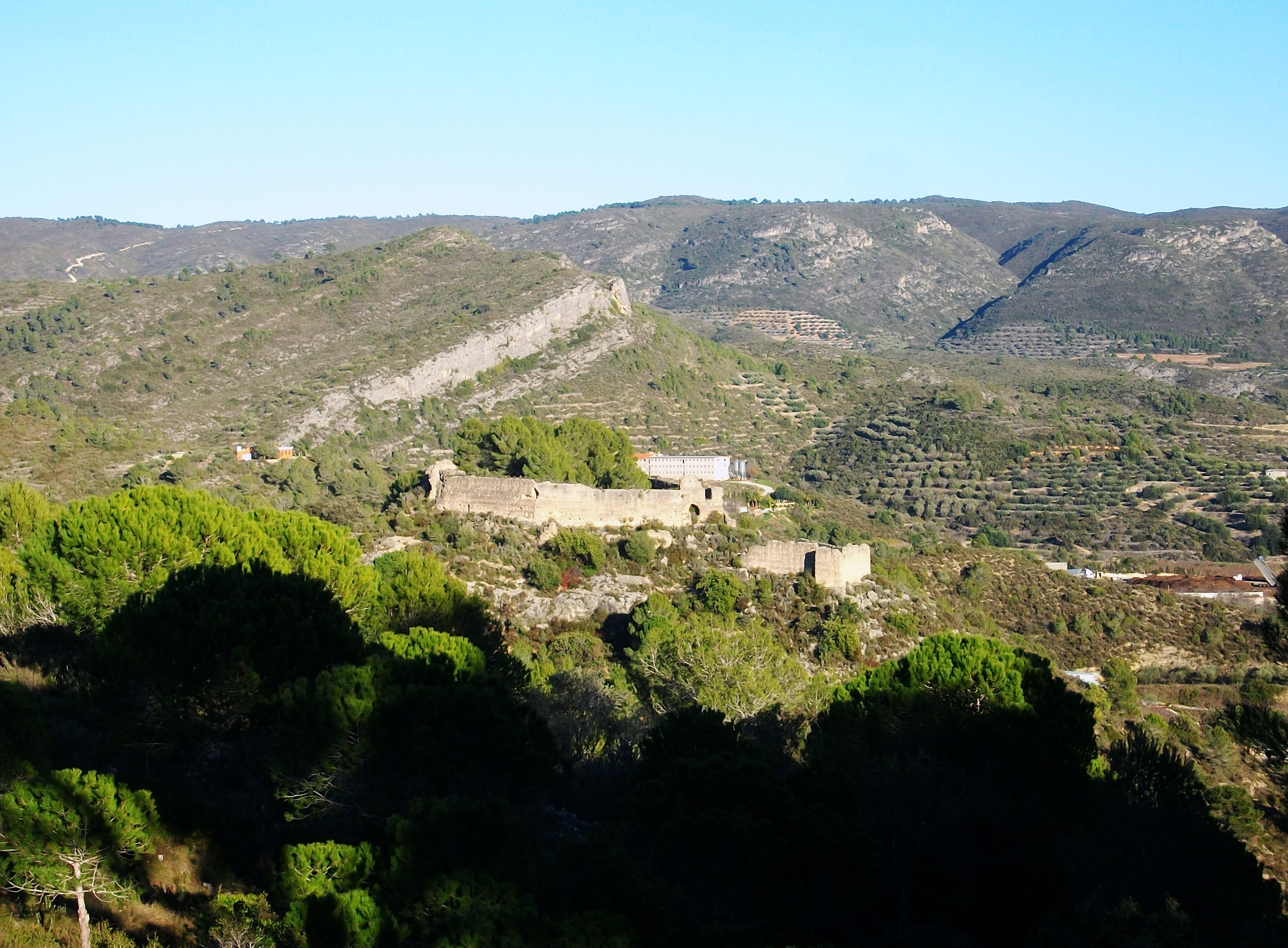
Castell del Xiu

The first written references about the town are about the reconquest of the municipality's area by James I of Aragon and the arrival of Catalan-Aragonese troops to the "beyond the Xúquer" lands. These describe the "Great Islamic revolt of 1247–1248, after which James I of Aragon in 1248, besieged and conquered the castle of the Xiu. Subsequently, James I of Aragon gave the town to the conquering troops and established a permanent Christian population in Llutxent, while the farms located around the town's area kept their native Islamic population.

In 1276, the town is razed during Al-Azraq's revolt. Jaume I, in response to the town's razing, sent Christian troops which successfully re-conquered the town. Next year, the town's control and territory was given to the Italian noble "Joan de Proxita", who created the Barony of Llutxent.

=== Christian rule ===
Between 1348 and 1349 Llutxent was scene to various skirmishes during the War of the Union of the Crown of Aragon.

The Proxitas, as lords of Llutxent, began the construction of the Palace Castle. In 1487, the town's lordship was handed over to the family of the Maçà.

== Main sights ==
Castles and palaces

- Castle of Xiu. Muslim. Abandoned after the Expulsion of the Moriscos, the building is still an important landmark for the town and its surrounding area. In dire need of renovation.
- Castle-palace of Llutxent. Constructed between the 15th and 16th centuries by the Proxitas. The building is currently owned by the municipality.

Religious buildings

- Church of the Assumption, built in the 19th century on top of an old Gothic Church in ruins. The building follows the Classical Architecture Style, and it is home to important pieces of art and culture of great historic value, such as the Santa Faç icon-chest.
- Monastery of the Corpus Christi (The convent), erected by the Dominicans, it was the first Valencian University (General Study in Arts and Theology). The building has undergone several renovations, modifications and extensions, with the most important one being the addition of the Corpus Christi in the 17th century, a church built in the Gothic style. A 200-year old Carob Tree can be found next to the Monastery.
- Chapel of the Consolation, founded by Catalan pilgrims in 1772, the building follows the Barroque Architecture Style. A stained glass windows were added to the chapel in the 1970s by Alfred Manessier.

Other sights

- The Coast, Stone-paved road built in 1580 that connected Monastery of the Corpus Christi with the town's church and was used for religious pilgrimage between the two.
- Farmer's park, near which various Llutxentine organizations are located.

Recent demographic trend
1990	1992	1994	1996	1998	2000	2002	2004	2005	2007	2012
2,435	2,358	2,392	2,377	2,378	2,412	2,456	2,512	2,526	2,571	2,508

== Government, politics and corruption ==
=== Local government ===
Llutxent's Municipal Council (Ajuntament in Catalan or Ayuntamiento in Spanish), is elected by universal suffrage according to proportional representation, in municipal elections held every 4 years, and it cannot be dissolved.

Logo of the Municipal Council of Llutxent

The law requires the Municipal Council to meet in full session at least every three months and extraordinary sessions can be called by either the mayor or by at least 1/4 of the Council Membership. The Municipal Council does not formulate major laws, but drafts regulations related to legislation from the Cortes Generales (The Legislative Body of Spain) or the Generalitat Valenciana (Regional Government). It oversees the budget, and it may raise taxes to supplement grants from the Central and the Regional Governments.

It is made up of 11 council members, who elect the mayor of the town (Alcalde, in Catalan and Spanish). If no head of the list of each party gets a majority of votes, the head of the list of the most voted party becomes mayor. The Municipal Council retains the right to a Motion of no confidence to remove the mayor and to install a new one.

The mayor, in most instances, serves as the leader of the majority party in the council. In addition to being chairman of the Municipal Council, directing municipal administration, heading the municipal police force, and exercising extensive powers of appointment, the mayor plays a major public relations role and enjoys a great deal of prestige. The mayor also organizes and elects the Local Government Team. The Local Government Team is usually composed of members of the Municipal Council members from the mayor's political party. The Local Government Team assists and advises the mayor. Llutxent's Local Government is currently subdivided into 4 Departments:

- Mayorship, headed by the mayor.
- Department of the Interior.
- Department of Health.
- Department of Tourism.

The municipal budget for fiscal year 2018 was of €3,092,766.42 ($3,465,753.58).

== Main sights ==
- Monastery of the Corpus Christi (Llutxent)

== See also ==
- Route of the Monasteries of Valencia
- List of municipalities in Valencia
