= Monastery of Santa María de la Valldigna =

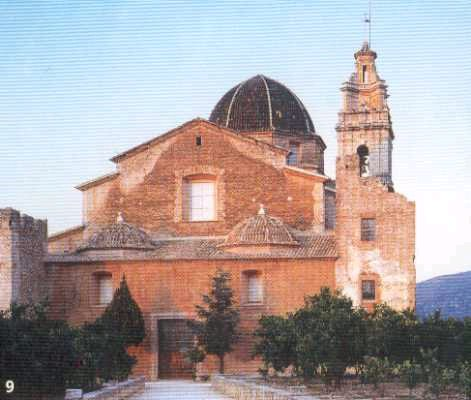

- Location within Spain
- Interactive map of Monastery of Santa María de la Valldigna

Monastery information
- Full name: Monastery of Santa María de la Valldigna
- Order: Cistercian
- Established: 1297
- Disestablished: 1835
- Diocese: Valencia

People
- Founder: James II

Site
- Location: Simat de la Valldigna, (Valencian Community)
- Coordinates: 39°02′00″N 0°19′00″W
- Visible remains: Restored
- Public access: Yes
- Website: www.fundaciojaumeeljust.es

The Monastery of Santa Maria de Valldigna is located in Simat de la Valldigna (Valencia).

== History ==
The monastery was founded in 1297 by James II of Aragon. Since the beginning, it was one of the most important monasteries of the Cistercian order. It was founded by the monks of Santes Creus in the Tarragona province. The whole Valldigna valley belonged to the monks, according to a royal order.

The monastery was inhabited by monks until 1835, when a revolt in the Valldigna valley took place after the Ecclesiastical Confiscations of Mendizábal. After that, the monks were forced to abandon the monastery. Most of its goods and works of art were sold, plundered or destroyed.

This ancient Cistercian monastery was neglected and in ruins, until the Generalitat Valenciana (Valencian Government) began a process of restoration.

After decades of abandonment, now the monastery of Santa Maria de Valldigna is, according to the 57th article of the Statute of Autonomy of the Valencian Community, "the spiritual, historical and cultural temple of the ancient Kingdom of Valencia. It is as well a symbol of the grandeur of the Valencian people". The same article states that "the Generalitat Valenciana will recover, restore and preserve the monastery (...) a law from the Valencian Parliament will determine the destiny and usage of the monastery as a meeting point of all Valencians, and as a research center for the recovery of the Valencian Community history".

== See also ==
- Monastery of Sant Jeroni de Cotalba
- Route of the Monasteries of Valencia
- Route of the Borgias
