= Monastery of la Murta =

Hieronymite Monastery in Valencia, Spain

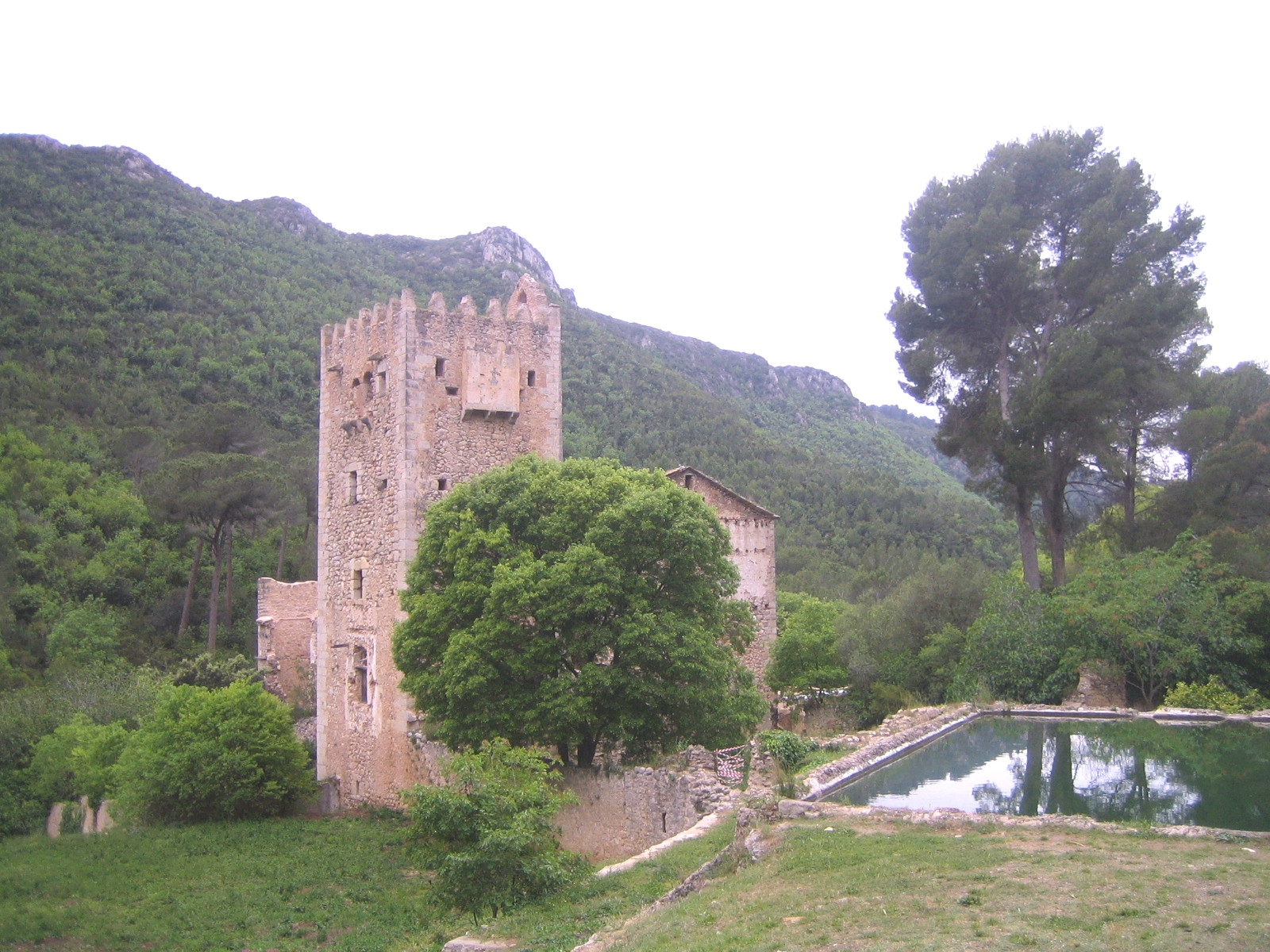

- Location within Spain
- Interactive map of Monastery of la Murta

Monastery information
- Full name: Monastery of Santa Maria de la Murta
- Order: Hieronymites
- Established: 1401
- Disestablished: 1835
- Mother house: Monastery of Sant Jeroni de Cotalba
- Diocese: Valencia

Site
- Location: Alzira (Valencia)
- Coordinates: 39°7′44.26″N 0°21′39.94″W
- Public access: Yes

The Monastery of Santa Maria de la Murta is a former monastery of the order of the Hieronymites located in the Valley of La Murta in Alzira (Valencia), Spain.

Throughout its history was an important emporium of culture and spirituality and centre of pilgrimage of the royalty, the aristocracy and influential religious characters. It was acquired by the City Hall of Alzira in 1989, and from 1995, is in recovery and restoration both the convent and its environment of La Murta Valley.

== Origins ==
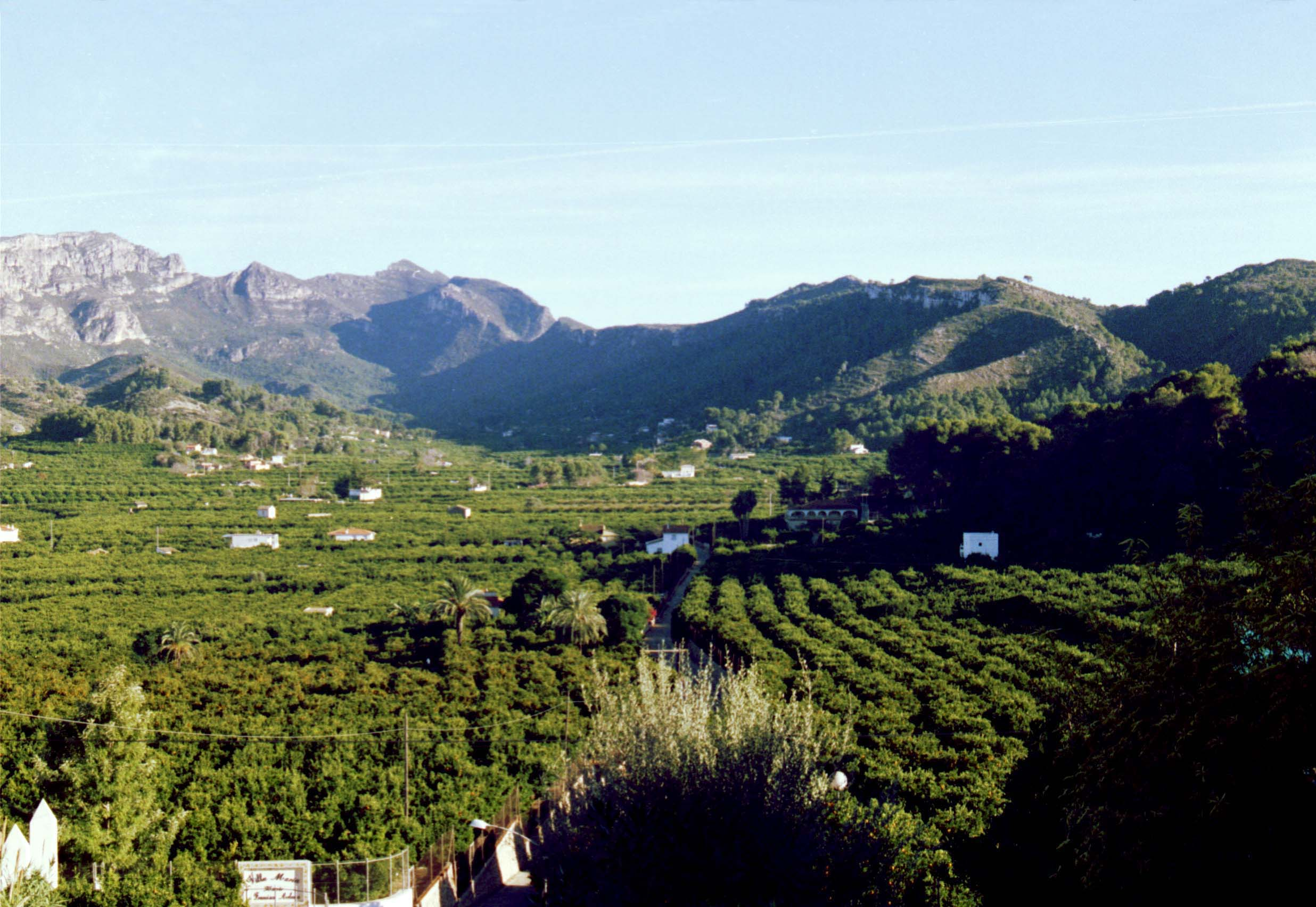
The Valley of la Murta, in Alzira.

In 568, under the reign of Liuvigild, San Donato and his hermits who had fled from Africa founded in the Valley, then called Valley of "Miralles', a servetano monastery. The Arab invasion in 711 left him devastated and the hermits were dispersed, the founder dying and being buried in the monastery. However its origins are documented in the manuscript 1773 of the father J.B. Morera, scholar of the archive of the monastery, from the fourteenth, when Arnau de Serra alcireno Knight, Lord of the lands of La Murta, authorization of the King Peter IV of Aragon, donated them to a group of hermits established on the Valley with the condition of founding a religious community.

He lived under the rule of the Hieronymites. After professing in Xàbia as monks of the Hieronymites order, Pope Gregory XI granted them the bull to found a monastery in 1376.

== Construction and period of splendor ==
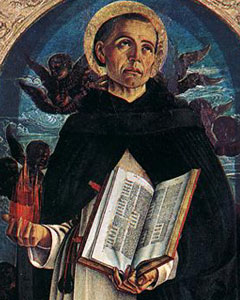
Saint Vincent Ferrer.

The new monastery was born under the protection of the important Monastery of Sant Jeroni de Cotalba, whose prior, Fray Domingo Lloret, and a group of monks were sent to Alzira in 1401. That same year, on February 11, began construction work according to the Benedictine, enhancing the church building and placing the other buildings around the cloister. In this first stage, in the year 1410, the monastery was visited by Saint Vincent Ferrer. The construction of the church is estimated in the middle of 15th century, time that began to happen the donations. The authorship of the initial work is attributed to Jaime Gallent, master builder of the city of Valencia, historical archive national includes a visit of the juries of Valencia to the monastery in which his name appears. Master Gallent participated in works such as the Portal of Quart and the Trinity, and also in the construction of the Royal Palace of Valencia.

The magnificent architectural development of the monastery was due to major donations from illustrious families and personalities, among which were two of the most important Valencian families: the Vich and Villaragut, to which belonged the Juan Bautista Villaragut prior. Other donations were made by the family of the Viscounts of Gallano, the niece of the Treasurer of the Catholic Monarchs Leonor de Heredia, Cardinal Cisneros, Toledo Archbishop and confessor of Queen Isabella the Catholic or the aristocrat Beatriz Proxita and Cronell, among others.

== Vich family ==
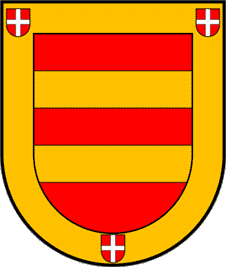
Shield noble family Vich.

In the 15th century, the Vich family had made donations for the construction of the monastery and had a chapel in the cloister, which was buried Luis Vich and Corbera, "Rational master" of the Kingdom of Valencia. But it was cardinal Guillermo Raimundo de Vich y de Vallterra (1460 / 1470–1525), Ambassador of the Council of Valencia in Rome, then Archdeacon of Xàtiva and Canon of Valencia, who sought to give a new church to the monastery. The works were financed by Jeronimo Vich and Valterra (1459–1535), Ambassador in Italy of Fernando the Catholic and Emperor Charles I. They were these made by Juan de Alicante and Agustín Muñoz, who had done work in the main buildings of Valencia, such as the Valencia Cathedral or the Consulate of the sea in 1528. Is the pigeon Tower. Deceased Guillén Ramón Vich and Valterra and Jeronimo Vich and Valterra, his successors maintained the link and his burial, but mainly dedicated its resources to other works.

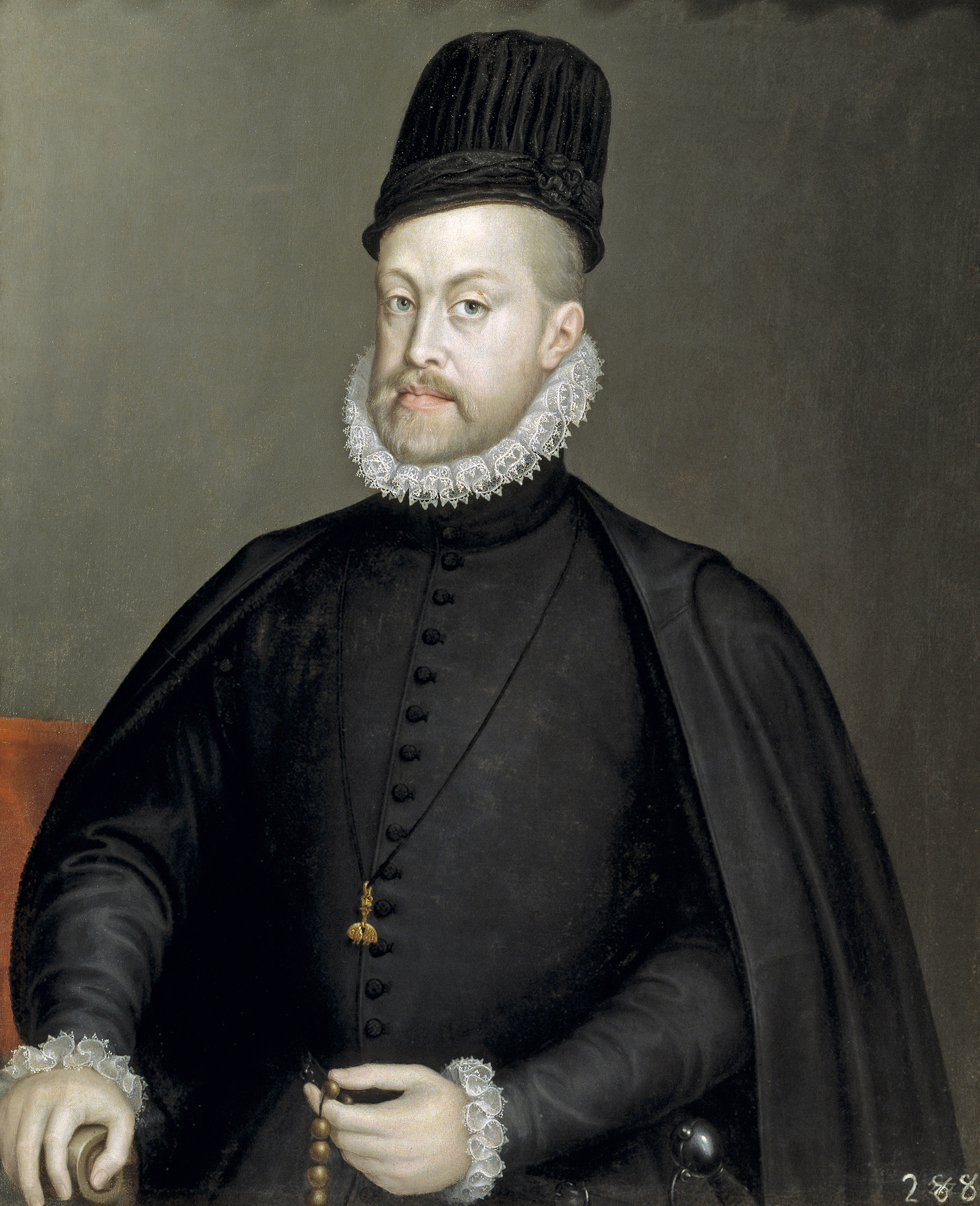
Philip II of Spain.

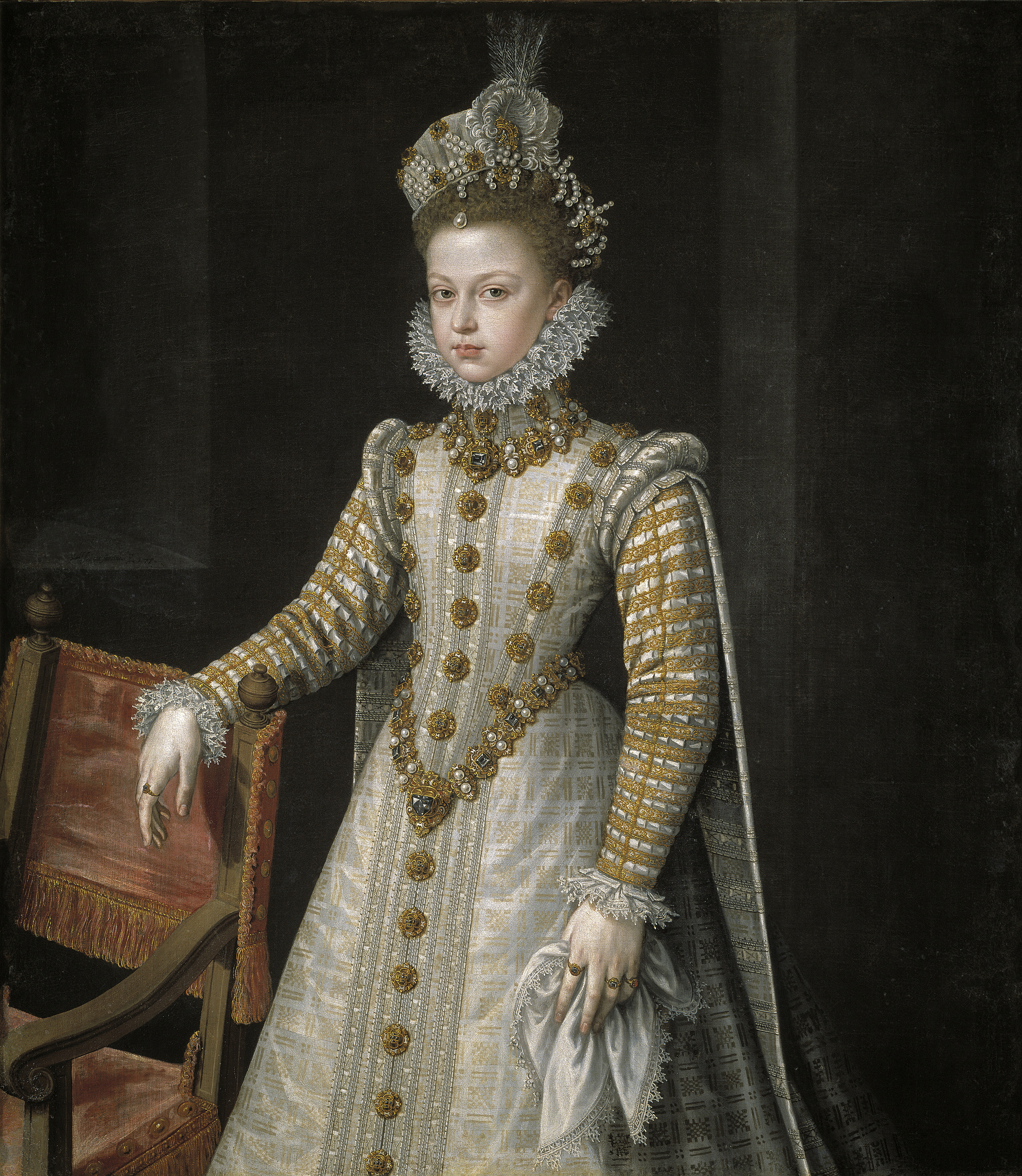
The Princess Isabella Clara Eugenia.

In 1586, the monastery was visited by the King Philip II accompanied by Prince Felipe and Isabella Clara Eugenia Princess. The King opened the new access bridge to the monastic enclosure, on the barranco de la Murta, which was baptized with its name. It was in the last years of the 16th century when he started the splendor of the monastery of La Murta from the hand of Juan Vich Manrique de Lara, Ambassador of Spain in the Holy, Mallorca Bishop and Archbishop of Tarragona, which promoted countless improvements and created the library. The monastery treasured an important heritage fruit of donations of the Vich family and other notable families in Exchange for burial. So did another illustrious member of the Vich, Luis Vich, Viceroy of Mallorca and the Order of Santiago Knight. Don Juan Vich and Lara, brother of the former, raised new church whose Chapel would be the new family grave. The work, done by architect Francisco Figuerola's Valencia was supervised by Diego Vich, and completed in 1623. Diego Vich, last member of the dynasty, was one of the most important protectors of Santa María de La Murta. He instructed Juan Miguel Orliens, author of the altarpiece is the altarpiece in 1631 of the Church of los Santos Juanes and the Monastery of San Miguel de los Reyes in Valencia. Painted and gilded by Pedro de Orrente, it was finished in 1634. The monastery became during this stage in a prominent religious and cultural center.

== 17th and 18th centuries ==
Following the death of Diego Vich, and with his legacy, the community could conclude the improvements that had been initiated in life of the guard. Along the 18th century monks undertook new improvement works, but already not elected teacher of the first order. The whole of the monastery was enlarged and renovated, stressing reform of the refectory and its bleaching, as well as the cloister, cell of the prior and church which was painted by the Milanese Carlos Lorenzo Soronetti and Pedro Bazzi in 1772. Thus he had done in the Church of Lliria, in the Carthusian monastery of Porta Coeli, and he had been in charge for the cathedrals of Zaragoza and Orihuela. They also highlighted the clad the walls with tiles and the enlargement and improvement of the Inn built in 1657.

== Decadence and confiscation ==
The life in the 19th century was very turbulent in Santa María de La Murta. The provisions left by Diego Vich ceased to be respected, and the decline of the monastery devoted himself to the monks to sell the biggest church organ and some works of art, paintings mostly. In 1835, in the wake of the Ecclesiastical Confiscations of Mendizábal, the monastery was closed. Eleven monks had at that time. In 1838 it passed into private hands, initiating a process of abandonment and looting of their property until its total ruin, which was aggravated to be engulfed the buildings by the nature surrounding them. Precisely that State of ruin in harmony with nature, has aroused the attention of historical and literary, being the monastery of la Murta which aroused more literary forays among all the Valencian Hieronymites monasteries.

== Religious characters ==
Among the characters religious who inhabited the monastery highlighted San Juan de Ribera, Antioquia and Viceroy Patriarch and Archbishop of Valencia, Gilabert Martí, Bishop of Segorbe, fray Peritoya, prior of the monastery and Bishop of Coria, fray Jerónimo Corella, Honduras Bishop, fray Juan de Esteban, Archbishop of Brindisi, fray Vicente de Montalbán, general of the Hieronymites, as well as the aforementioned family church members Vich and Saint Vincent Ferrer.

== Art and treasures ==
Along the centuries the monastery of Santa María de La Murta, besides its constant architectural enrichment, made collection by patronages and donations of many treasures and works of art, becoming one of the most important historical and artistic monuments of the Valencian Community. However, currently it is not one of the best known, because of its abandonment and long forgotten during 150 years.

The multitude of artistic treasures which contained include: the altarpiece where acquired at the beginning of the 16th century, "Verónica" and alabaster altarpiece representing "The baptism" which did bring Italy Jeronimo Vich and Valterra (preserved today in the Museum of fine arts of Valencia), the altarpiece of the "Crucifixion", precious liturgical objects donated to Juan Vich Manrique de Lara in 1593. 1597 organ, the altar and the choir stalls of the choir, magnificent altarpiece of Saint Joseph, the altarpiece of the chapel of the Kings, the altarpiece of the Nativity of Christ, el retablo of Saint Jerome, the altarpiece of Saint Peter and Saint Paul, "Calvary", "Christ embracing the cross" and "Christ in Limbo" of Sebastiano del Piombo, which are preserved in the Museo Nacional del Prado, a table of El Greco, a "Savior" of Juan de Juanes and many works paintings of great masters painters such as Albrecht Dürer, Jacopo Bassano, the Flemish landscape Paul Bril and Francisco Ribalta, (of which 31 portraits of Juan Ribalta and his workshop are preserved in the Museum of Fine Arts of Valencia), Pedro de Orrente, José de Ribera or Lorenzo Castro. The last part of this heritage of the monastery library, which was a member of the and Juan Vich Manrique de Lara, the archdeacon Pedro Esplugues, Cardinal Vera and the Bishop of Segorbe, Gilabert Martí, all of them born in Alzira.

== Bibliography ==
- Luis Arciniega García: Santa María de la Murta (Alcira): Artífices, comitentes y la Damnatio Memoriae de D. Diego Vich, Separata de la obra La orden de San Jerónimo y sus monasterios. Actas del Simposium (I). San Lorenzo del Escorial, 1/5-IX-1999.
- Morera, Juan Bautista (1995). Ayuntamiento de Alzira, Germania Serveis Gràfics, S.L.. ed. Historia de la fundación del monasterio del valle de Miralles y hallazgo y maravillas de la santísima imagen de nuestra señora de La Murta, de Juan Bautista Morera (Año 1773). pp. 197. ISBN 84-88689-22-5.
- Campón Gonzalvo, Julia (1991). Ayuntamiento de Alcira. ed. Historia del Monasterio de Santa María de la Murta. pp. 106.

== See also ==
- Monastery of Sant Jeroni de Cotalba
- Route of the Monasteries of Valencia
