= Barx =

Barx Bárig
- Municipality
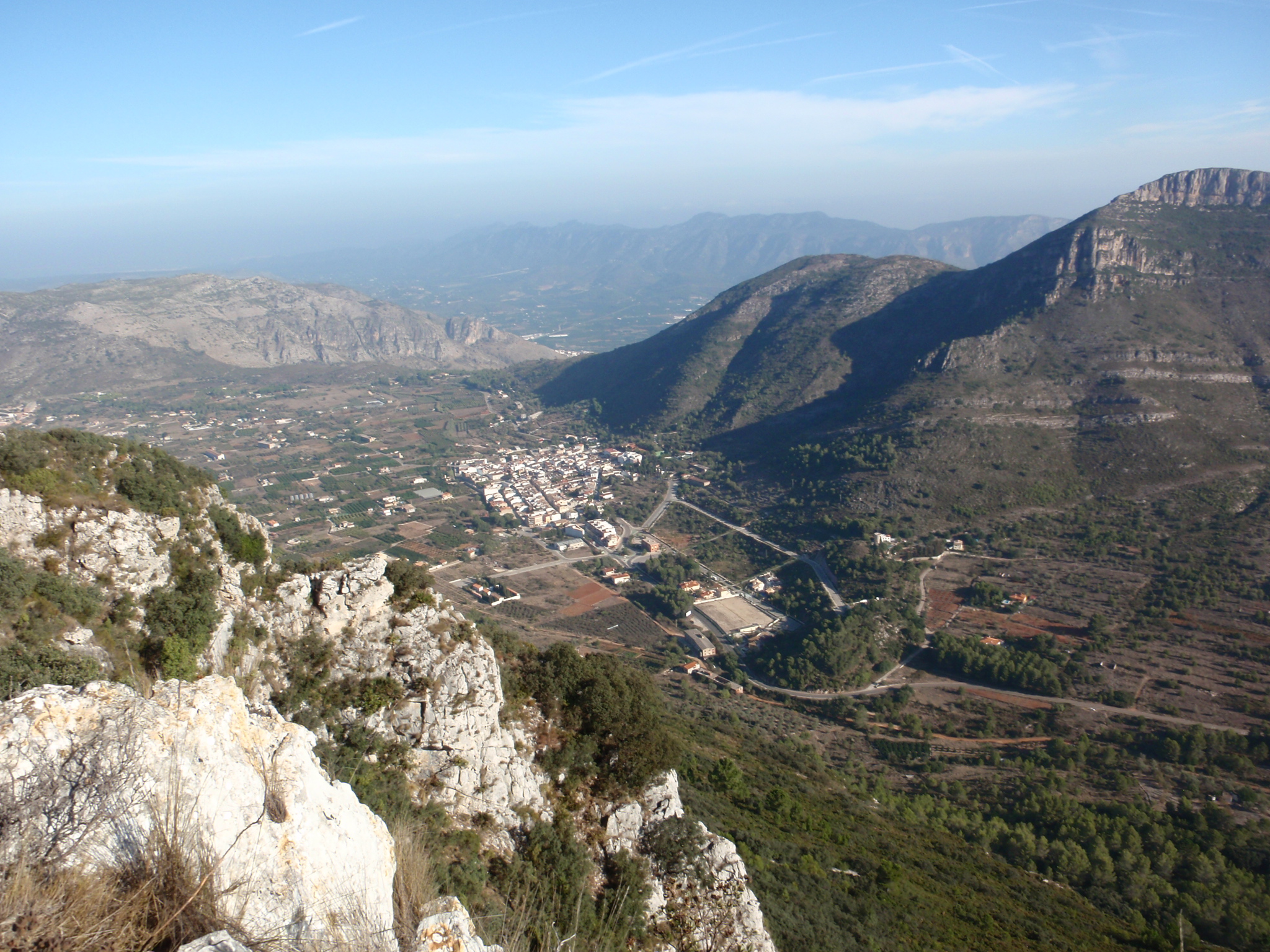

- Coat of arms

- Location in Spain Barx (Valencian Community) Barx (Spain)
- Coordinates: 39°0′52″N 0°18′6″W
- Country: Spain
- Autonomous community: Valencian Community
- Province: Valencia
- Comarca: Safor
- Judicial district: Gandia

Government
  - Alcalde: Miguel Miñena Climent (2007) (PSPV-SOE)

Area
  - Total: 16.1 km^{2} (6.2 sq mi)
- Elevation: 325 m (1,066 ft)

Population (2025-01-01)
  - Total: 1,501
  - Density: 93.2/km^{2} (241/sq mi)
- Demonym(s): barxer, -a (Val.)
- Time zone: UTC+1 (CET)
  - Summer (DST): UTC+2 (CEST)
- Postal code: 46758
- Official language(s): Valencian; Spanish

Barx (Valencian: [ˈbaɾtʃ]; Spanish: Bárig [ˈbaɾiɣ], also [ˈbaɾtʃ]) is a municipality in the comarca of Safor in the Valencian Community, Spain.

== Etymology ==
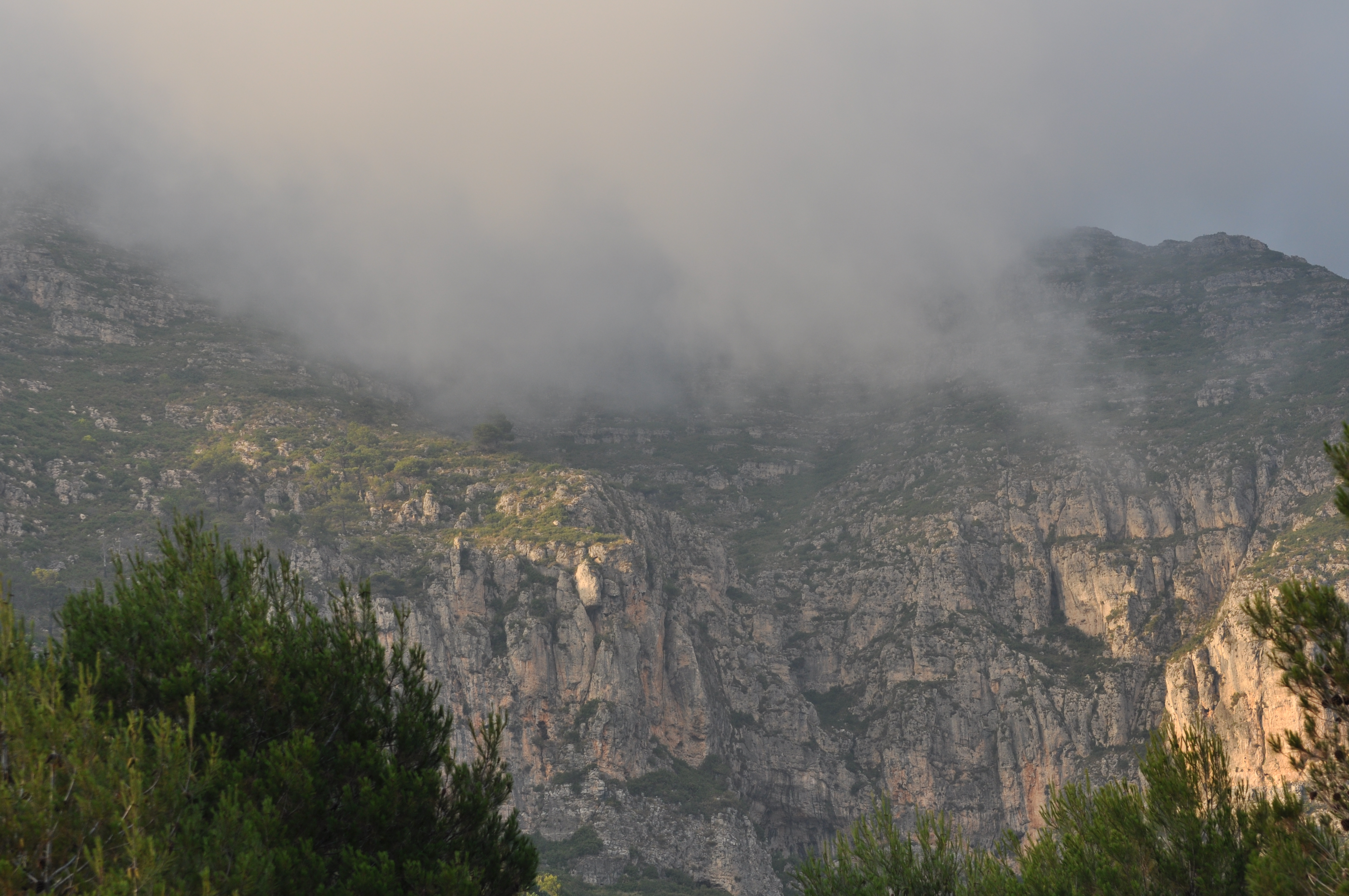
The mountains of Barx village

Tackling the etymology of the place name "Barx" is no simple matter and has caused heated controversy between scholars of Roman and Moorish languages and dialects. The place name occurs in many forms in ancient texts. Moorish scholars contend that the first name identified as connected with Barx is Bodj Aldjabal (the "tower of the mountains"). Humbler beginnings come out of other associated words and Christian scholars favour Perxe …an old word meaning 'cabin' …corrupted into Berxe by Arab pronunciation.

Tower or cabin, bordj or berxe, what is important is the fact that the historical existence of the name attests to the presence of a community with an ancestry that dates back to the first millennium.

The long history of the village and its geographic isolation have led to two juxtaposed social attitudes: a desire for contact with the outside world and a preference for isolation from it. Perched at a considerable height (some 1,300 feet above sea level) with respect to the whole natural district of the Commonwealth (or Mancomunitat) of Valldigna, Barx is the sole mountain community. This geographic semi-isolation has fostered a high degree of "cultural independence", which has been described as the key to understanding the peculiarity of the past and present of the village of Barx.

== Prehistory ==
The Parpalló cave (Gandia) and the one at Malladetes (Barx) constitute two of the more important sites in the Mediterranean peninsular region. The archaeological materials obtained from the caves attest to the area being occupied uninterrupted between 29,000 years ago and a date just 11,000 years ago. The people developed a hunter-gatherer way of life.

The culture can be characterised by the elaborate utensils made from both stone and bone. One of the singular aspects of the Parpalló cave is the rich collection cave paintings and limestone engravings depicting animals and other topics. The existence of these scenes confirms a high artistic and symbolic capacity of the ancient population.

== See also ==
- List of municipalities in Valencia
