= Church of Santa Catalina =

Church of Santa Catalina may refer to:

- Church of Santa Catalina (Caudete)
- Church of Santa Catalina (El Bonillo)
- Church of Santa Catalina (Sevilla)
- Church of Santa Catalina, Valencia

== See also ==
- Church of Santa Catarina (Calheta)
