= Chimo =

Chimo may refer to:

- Chimo (greeting), a greeting from the Inuktitut language of northern Canada, also used in some parts of Southern Ontario and Western Canada
- Chimo, the nickname, cheer and mascot of the Canadian Military Engineers
- Chimo (orca), the only white killer whale displayed in captivity, at Sealand of the Pacific from 1970 to 1972
- Chimo!, 1960s Canadian rock band
- Chimo Bayo, 1990s Spanish dance act
- Chimo (pseudonym), author of Lila Says (novel) and its protagonist
- Chimo (music), a march played during Moros y Cristianos parades in Spain
- USS Chimo (ACM-1) the lead ship of her class of minelayers in the United States Navy during World War II
