= Alhorines Valley =

Alhorines Valley Valle de los Alhorines
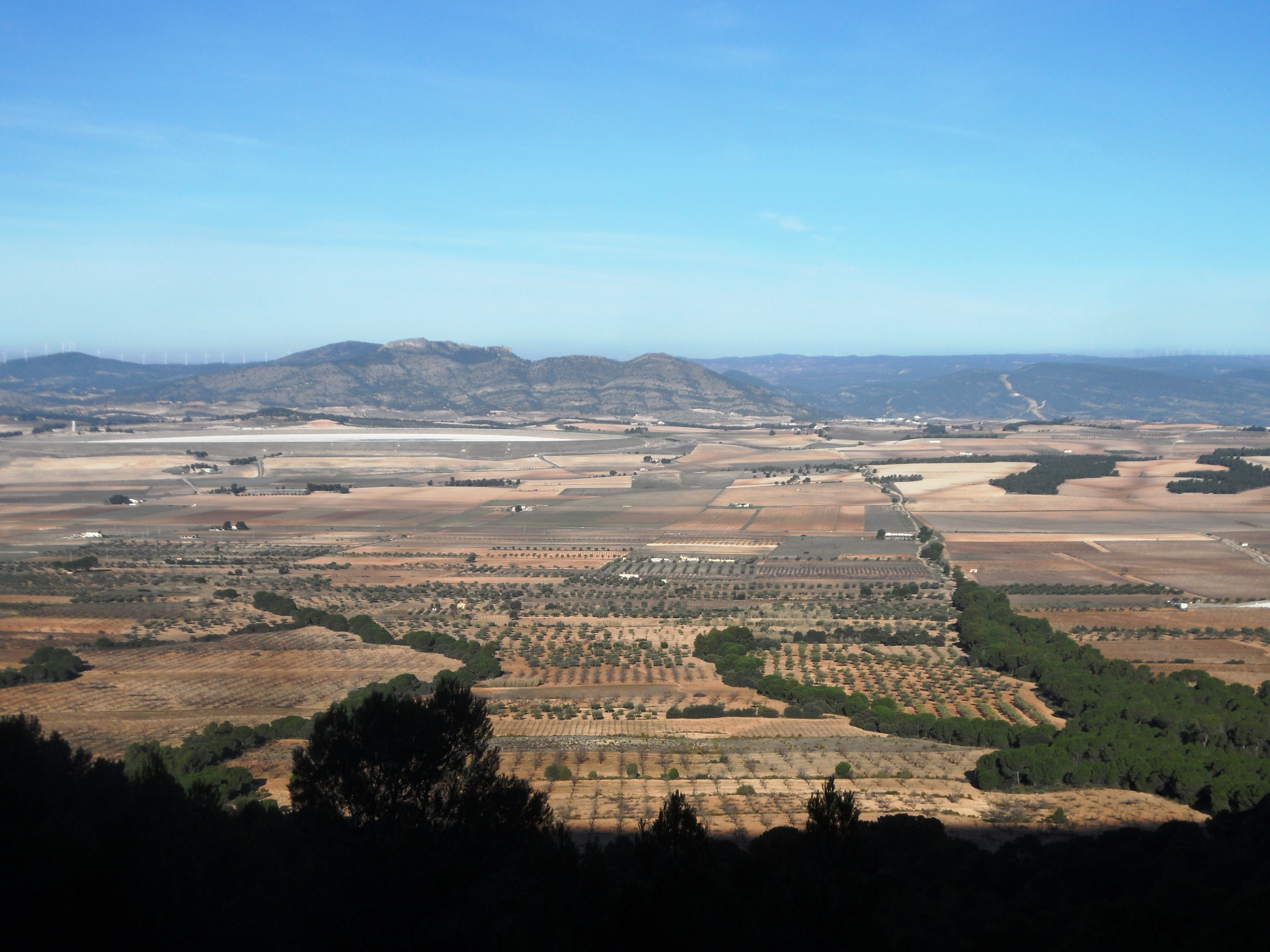
- Valle de los Alhorines; to the right of la Vereda de la Zafra

- Location within Spain
- Coordinates: 38.765556°N 0.823889°W
- Country: Spain

The Alhorines Valley (Spanish: Valle de los Alhorines) is a valley and a major grain producing area of the provinces of Albacete, Alicante and Valencia in Spain. Historically it was long disputed between the towns of Caudete and Villena. A large solar thermal power plant has recently been built in the valley. The lesser kestrel was re-introduced in 1997. Conservation measures have been taken to minimize impact of the power plant on the birds.

== Location ==
The Alhorines is one of the best cereal-growing areas in the province of Alicante. The level of insolation in the area is among the highest in the Valencia region, at 1,900 kWh/m2 annually. It is a relatively dry agricultural valley, but is of interest due to its unique layout. This includes small plots alternating between grain crops, vineyards and orchards, separated by fences and natural banks, with some sandy area colonized by pines. This makes it an appropriate habitat for numerous species of wildlife, especially small predators. The Bodegas Los Pinos winery in Fontanars dels Alforins, 635 metres (2,083 ft) above sea level, was founded at the end of the 19th century and in 1990 became the first organic winery in the Valencian Community and the second in Spain.

== History ==
The valley was inhabited in Roman times, and later was populated by the Arabs of Villena. At the time of the Christian conquest by the troops of James I of Aragon its ownership was disputed between the towns of Caudete and Villena. The valley was given to Caudete and the kingdom of Aragon in 1240, but under the 1244 Treaty of Almizra between James I and the future Alfonso X of Castile the castle and town of Villena were transferred to Castile. In 1304 Villena became the property of the Marquis of Villena. In 1355 the Viceroy of Valencia try to buy the western part of the valley, leaving the Ontinyent portion the property of Caudete. But Villena never allowed the sale of its part.

During the War of the Spanish Succession (1701–1714) Caudate supported the Archduke Charles of Austria while Villena supported Philip of Bourbon. After the Bourbon victory, Villena accused Caudete of treason and claimed the valley of Alhorines. Philip V of Spain confirmed the transfer and made Caudete part of Villena. In 1736 Caudete regained its independence, but became part of Murcia. The dispute over the valley continued to simmer. In 1836 Villena was attached to the province of Alicante and Caudete to Albacete. North-East part Alhorines remained under the control of Ontinyent until 5 August 1927, when it was separated to form a new municipality. This was officially called Fontanars dels Alforins since 1992.

== Solar power plant ==
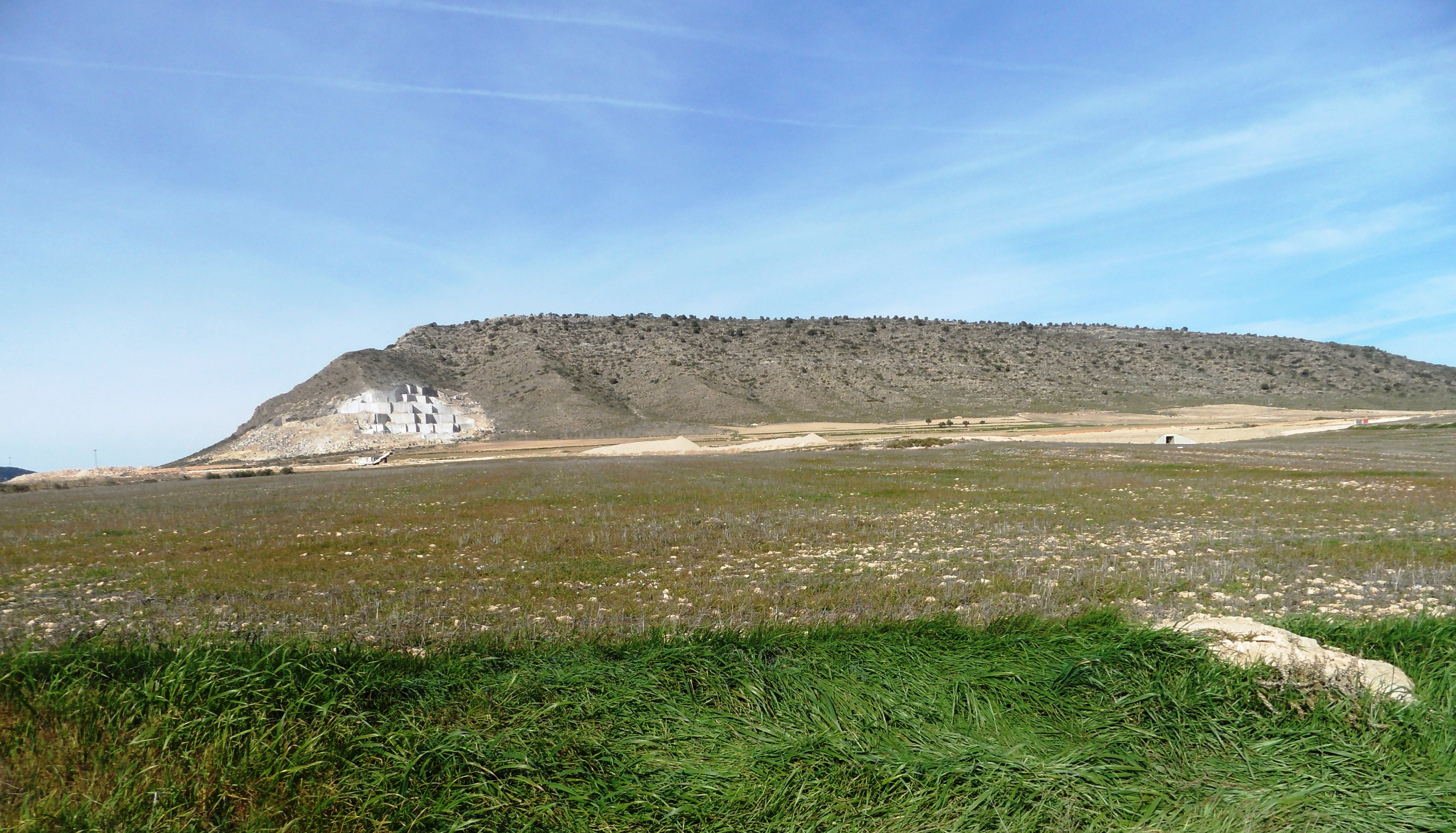
Peñón del Rocín from Camino de la Reina

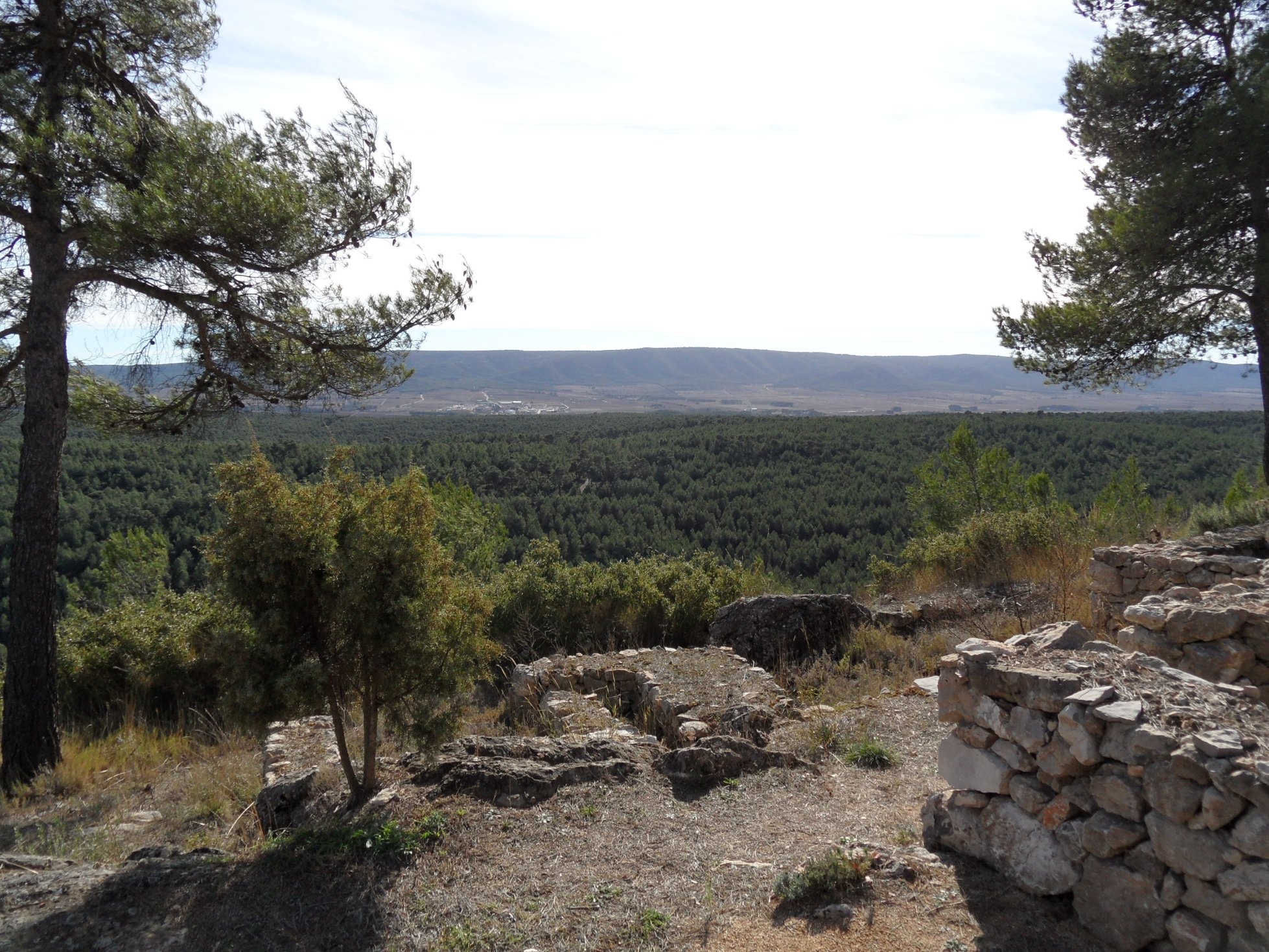
Bastida de les Alcusses

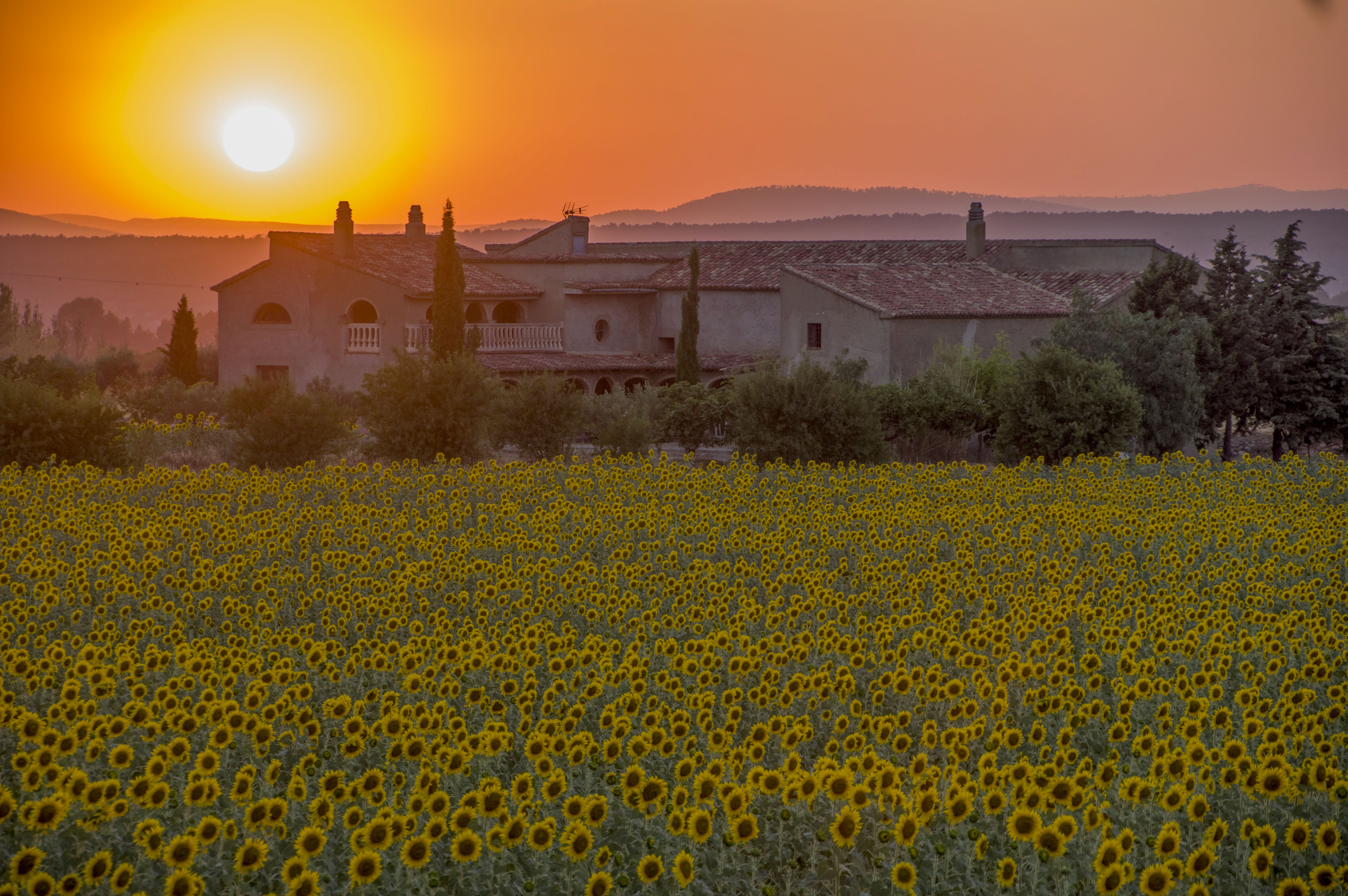
Sunflowers in the protected area of the Alhorines Valley

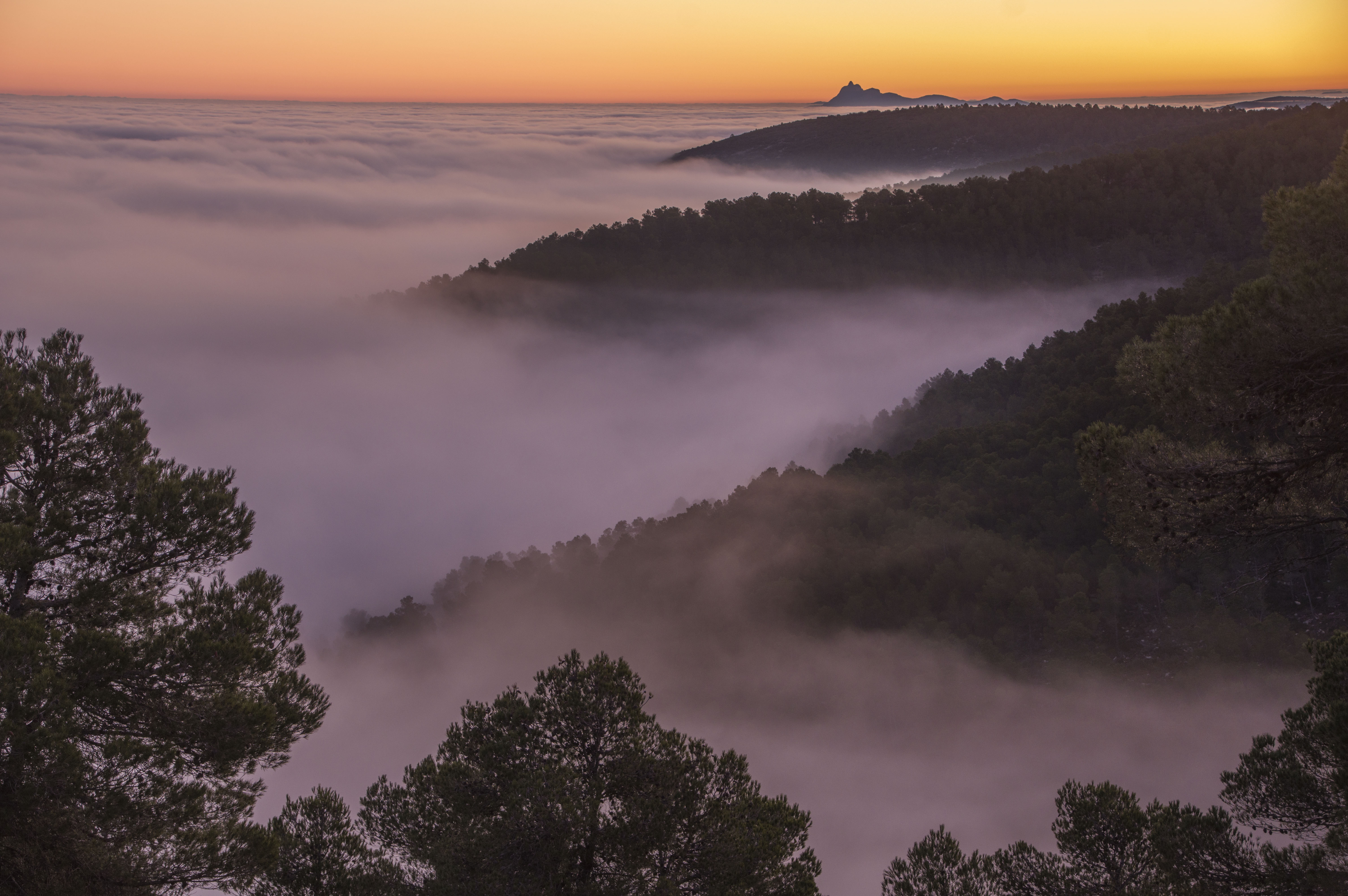
Starting the year with mists in the Alhorines Valley

A solar thermal power plant project was formally launched in November 2006 in the valley. It came into operation in September 2013 beside the Villena prison at the southern end of the valley in the Villena municipality. The plant covers 230 hectares (570 acres) and is located between the A-31, N-344 and CV-656 roads. Heat is focused by parabolic mirrors onto a central tower, and used to drive steam turbines. The plant's installed capacity is 50 MW with an annual output of 110,000 MWh. This provides power to 40,000–50,000 people, and replaces emission into the atmosphere of about 40,000 tons of CO_{2} each year. The project involved an investment of 240 million euros, and was expected to generate 750 new jobs, 300 directly and 450 indirectly.

The environmental impact assessment for the power plant was approved before all the official objections had been addressed. The question of water use does not seem to have been raised. The plant would consume about 375,000 cubic metres (13,200,000 cu ft) annually. There were conflicts between the company building the power plant and the Salvatierra collective of Villena, but they seemed to have ended with the draft environmental plan developed by Enestar. This included rehabilitating the old Ermita-Casa Conejo and providing an educational facility to provide information on renewable energy and the environment. Four nature routes would also be established.

Construction began in May 2012.

== Conservation ==
In 1997 the Department of Environment began a project to reintroduce the lesser kestrel, a small raptor that had been made locally extinct due to human action. In February 2014 the Department of the Environment stated it was adding 6.69 hectares (16.5 acres) to an existing 12.75 hectares (31.5 acres) wildlife reserve in the valley. Both were established in response to construction of the solar-thermal power plant. The aim was to ensure the survival of the unusual grassland ecosystem of Valencia that is home to the lesser kestrel, Montagu's harrier and little bustard. Changes to land use are prohibited within the reservation, as is the use of pesticides or other harmful chemicals.

== Wine production ==
Throughout history there has been an important wine-growing activity in the valley, in the districts of Fontanars dels Alforins, La Font de la Figuera, Moixent and in La Zafra, part of the municipality of Villena. Until the Civil War there were around 80 wine cellars, and each family estate produced its own wine. Shortly afterwards, several cooperatives were created and some bodegas disappeared. In 2009 the valley's winemakers created Terres dels Alforins, a non-profit association, with the Valencia appellation of origin, and which has 12 bodegas. Among them are Daniel Belda, Los Frailes, Heretat de Taverners, Celler del Roure by Pablo Calatayud, Rafael Cambra, Arráez, Los Pinos; Casa Turús, conceived around Manuel García Portillo's Origen project, Enguera, and Vinya Alforí.
