= Caudete =

- Municipality
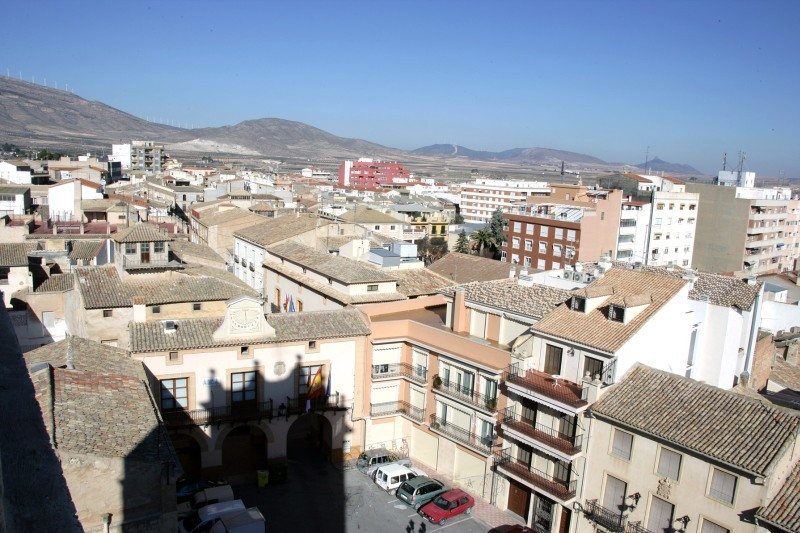

- Coat of arms

- Location within Castilla-La Mancha Location within Spain
- Coordinates: 38°42′16″N 0°59′17″W
- Country: Spain
- Autonomous Community: Castilla–La Mancha
- Province: Albacete

Government
  - Mayor: Moisés López Martínez (PP)

Area
  - Total: 142 km^{2} (55 sq mi)
- Elevation: 557 m (1,827 ft)

Population (2025-01-01)
  - Total: 10,439
  - Density: 73.5/km^{2} (190/sq mi)
- Time zone: UTC+1 (CET)
  - Summer (DST): UTC+2 (CEST (GMT +2))
- Postal code: 02660
- Area code: +34 (Spain) + 967 (Albacete)
- Website: www.caudete.es

Caudete (Spanish pronunciation: [kawˈðete]) is a municipality of Spain located in the province of Albacete, Castilla–La Mancha. It has a population of 10.163 (From INE 2015). It is part of the Altiplanicie de Almansa comarca.

== History ==
Following its Christian conquest in 1240, Caudete became part of the Crown of Castile as result of the Treaty of Almizra, featuring a mudéjar population. It later passed to the Crown of Aragon, and the first Christian settlers arrived after a charter was granted in 1305.

There were ongoing disputes between Caudete and nearby Villena over control of the Alhorines Valley, an important wheat-growing area.

On the wake of the 1429–1430 Castilian–Aragonese War, the town was besieged and taken by force by Castile. It was reincorporated to Aragon on 22 October 1436. Caudete became part of the land of Ontinyent in 1446.

Caudete, which favoured the Bourbon side at the early stages of the War of the Spanish Succession, eventually came to support the Austracist side. As a result of siding with the losing faction, Caudete lost his local autonomy and was annexed to Villena in 1707.

Until the 19th century the dominant language in the municipality was Valencian with some aspects of Aragonese. Since then the region has undergone forceful linguistic substitution by Spanish similar to what happened in the Valencian comarca of Vega Baja del Segura. Today the principal language is Spanish with some Valencian words. Caudete is famous for its Moros y Cristianos festival in September.

== See also ==
- Church of Santa Catalina (Caudete)
