= USS Bastion =

Minelayer in the United States Navy during World War II

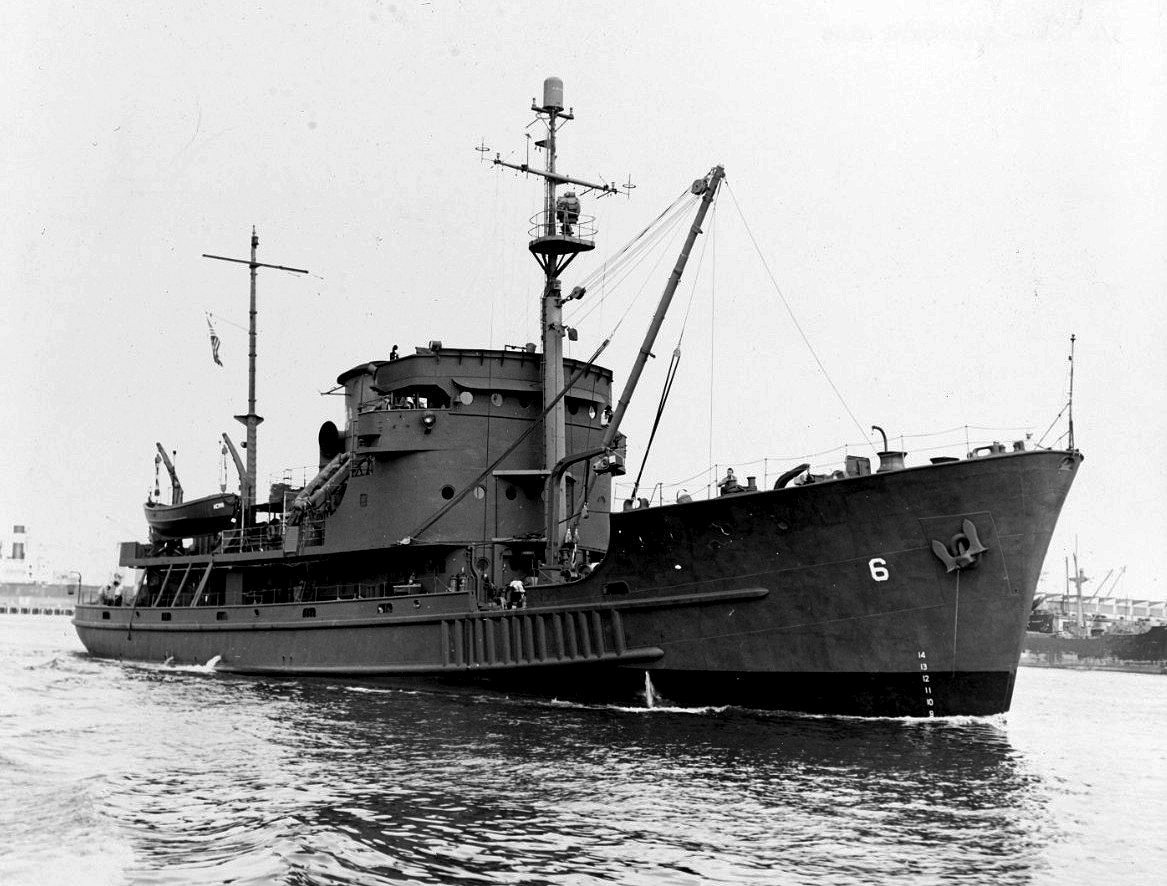

History

United States
- Name: Colonel Henry J. Hunt (1942-1945); Bastion (1945-1946); Jonquil (1946-1969)
- Operator: U.S. Army Mine Planter Service (1942-1945); U.S. Navy (1945-1946); U.S. Coast Guard (1946-1969)
- Builder: Marietta Manufacturing Company, Point Pleasant, West Virginia
- Laid down: as USAMP Colonel Henry J. Hunt for the U.S. Army Coast Artillery Corps
- Acquired: 4 January 1945
- Commissioned: 9 April 1945
- Decommissioned: 18 June 1946
- Renamed: Bastion, 9 April 1945
- Stricken: 19 July 1946
- Fate: Transferred to the Coast Guard, 18 June 1946; decommissioned on 15 September 1969

General characteristics
- Class & type: Chimo-class minelayer
- Displacement: 1,320 long tons (1,341 t) full
- Length: 188 ft 2 in (57.35 m)
- Beam: 37 ft (11 m)
- Draft: 12 ft 6 in (3.81 m)
- Propulsion: Skinner Engine Company reciprocating steam engine; 2 boilers; 1,200 SHP; twin propellers.
- Speed: 12.5 knots (23.2 km/h; 14.4 mph)
- Complement: 69
- Armament: 1 × 40 mm gun; Mines
- Notes: Characteristics as Mine Planter and Coast Guard vessel, particularly displacement, might differ.

USS Bastion (ACM-6) was a Chimo-class minelayer in the United States Navy during World War II.

Bastion was originally the USAMP Colonel Henry J. Hunt (MP-2) — a mine planter built in 1942 at Point Pleasant, West Virginia, by the Marietta Manufacturing Co. for the U.S. Army Mine Planter Service. She was acquired by the U.S. Navy from the U.S. Army on 4 January 1945, renamed Bastion, converted to an auxiliary minelayer and commissioned at Charleston, South Carolina 9 April 1945; Lt. Earl D. Fatkin, USNR, Commanding. The ship was transferred to the U.S. Coast Guard in 1946 and commissioned USCGC Jonquil (WAGL/WLB-330 serving until 1969.

== Service history ==
=== U.S. Navy service ===
Bastion departed Charleston, South Carolina for the Pacific Theatre on 17 June 1945. She transited the Panama Canal on 23 June 1945 and arrived at San Diego, California 7 July 1945. Bastion reported to Minesweeping Force Pacific Fleet (ComMinPac) Commander, MINECRAFT, Pacific, at Pearl Harbor, Territory of Hawaii in August 1945.

Bastion arrived in the Marianas Islands on 22 August 1945. Although classified a minelayer, she performed minesweeping and repair-ship duties throughout the Marianas during August and September 1945. Between October and December 1945 she continued these duties in the Ryukyu Islands. Bastion departed Okinawa 17 December 1945 and arrived in Japan 21 December 1945 where she performed further minesweeping and repair-ship duties during the Occupation of Japan until 11 March 1946.

=== Decommissioning ===
On 11 March 1946, Bastion headed home. She was decommissioned on 18 June 1946 at San Francisco, California and was immediately transferred to the U.S. Coast Guard. Her name was struck from the Navy list on 19 July 1946.

=== U.S. Coast Guard service ===
The U.S. Coast Guard commissioned her USCGC Jonquil (WAGL/WLB-330) on 29 August 1946. She was converted to a buoy tender, assigned to the Fifth Coast Guard District and was based out of Portsmouth, Virginia. Jonquil serviced aids to navigation (ATON), participated in search and rescue (SAR) and law enforcement as needed.

On 14 March 1950 Jonquil escorted a disabled trawler to Thimble Shoal in Chesapeake Bay Virginia. On 7 April 1950 she assisted a barge that was adrift. On 19 October 1951 she assisted M/V Theofano Livano aground near Cape Henry Chesapeake Bay, Virginia. From 11 to 12 December 1951 she towed the disabled M/V McKittrick Hills to the Chesapeake Lightship where McKittrick Hills was transferred to a commercial tug. From 26 to 27 February 1952 she assisted a grounded tug, M/V Mary Sheridan near the York Spit Light Chesapeake Bay, Virginia. On 11 March 1952 she assisted the disabled F/V Elizabeth two miles southeast of Turner Lump near Chincoteague Bay, Virginia. On 14 May 1954 Jonquil assisted a grounded barge near Diamond Marsh, Virginia. In October 1954 she assisted the disabled ferry M/V Princess Ann near Kiptopeke Beach, Virginia. On 11 April 1956 she assisted M/S Paraporti aground near Lynnhaven Inlet.

Jonquil was transferred to Morehead City, North Carolina on 1 September 1960. On 27 September 1961 she helped fight a fire aboard USNS Potomac at Beaufort, North Carolina. On 9 March 1962 she stood by the stern section of the tanker M/S Gem following her break-up. From 6 to 7 December 1962 she towed the disabled M/Y Cid for 185 miles to Morehead City, North Carolina. On 28 July 1969 Jonquil dewatered the schooner S/S Chawe Souris 19 miles west of the Frying Pan Shoals Light. Jonquil was decommissioned on 15 September 1969 after 23 years of service in the U.S. Coast Guard..

== See also ==
- List of ships of the United States Army
