= USS Barricade =

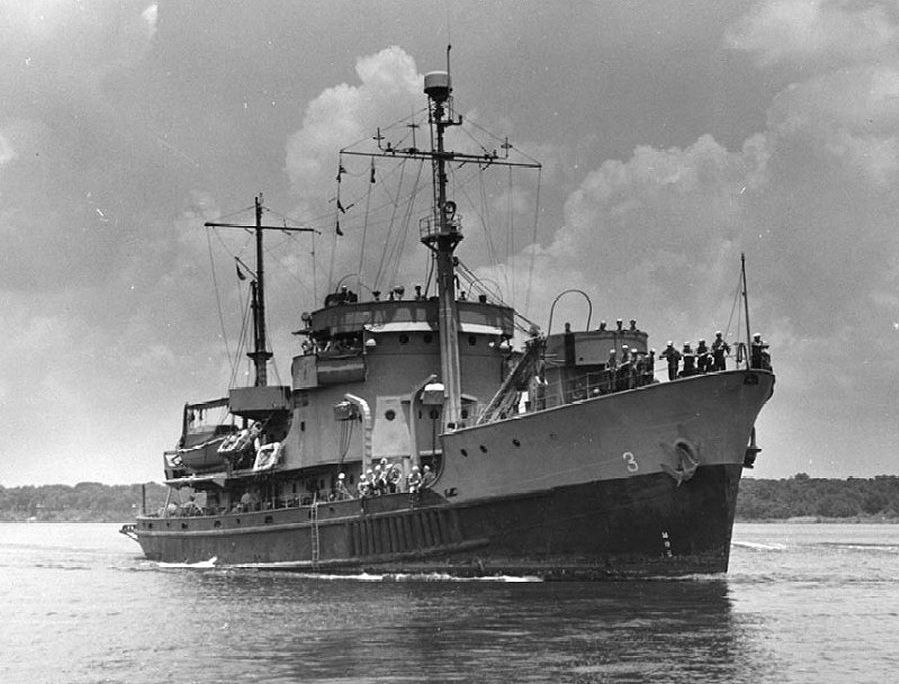
- Barricade underway at Jacksonville, Florida on 27 June 1945

History

United States
- Name: USAMP Colonel John Storey (MP8)
- Namesake: COL John Storey, U.S. Army
- Builder: Marietta Manufacturing Company, Point Pleasant, West Virginia
- Laid down: 1942
- Commissioned: 1942
- Decommissioned: 1944
- Fate: Transferred to U.S. Navy, 7 April 1944.

United States
- Name: USS Barricade (ACM-3)
- Acquired: 7 April 1944
- Commissioned: 7 April 1944
- Decommissioned: 28 June 1946
- Reclassified: 1944. Auxiliary mine layer.
- Refit: 1944 Norfolk Naval Shipyard. 26 June to 10 August 1945, Jacksonville, Florida
- Stricken: 19 July 1946
- Honors and awards: 1 battle star
- Fate: Transferred to the U.S. Coast Guard, 28 June 1946

United States
- Name: USCGC Magnolia (WAGL-328)
- Namesake: Magnolia
- Acquired: 28 June 1946
- Commissioned: 19 October 1947
- Decommissioned: 13 August 1971
- Reclassified: Coast Guard, Auxiliary, General, Lighthouse tender WAGL (1946). Coast Guard, Large, Buoy tender WLB (1965)
- Refit: 1946, Bethlehem Shipyard, San Francisco, California
- Identification: IMO number: 7645689
- Nickname(s): "The Maggie"; "Maggie May"
- Fate: Sold commercial. Burned and sank as result of an explosion as FPV Galaxy, 2 October 2002.
- Notes: Call sign NXRE

General characteristics
- Class & type: Chimo-class minelayer.
- Displacement: 1,320 long tons (1,341 t) full
- Length: 188 ft 2 in (57.35 m)
- Beam: 37 ft (11 m)
- Draft: 12 ft 6 in (3.81 m)
- Propulsion: Skinner Engine Company reciprocating steam engine; 2 Combustion Engineering boilers; 1,200 SHP; twin propellers
- Speed: 12.5 knots (23.2 km/h; 14.4 mph)
- Range: 3000 nmi at 8.5 kn; (5500 km at 16 km/h); 2375 nmi at 11.5 kn; (4400 km at 21 km/h)
- Complement: 69 (USN); 52 (USCG).
- Sensors & processing systems: AN/SPS-53 Radar
- Armament: 1 × 40 mm gun, M2 Browning machine guns and small arms. (USN).; M2 Browning machine guns, M60 Machine guns, and small arms (USCG)

USS Barricade (ACM-3) was a Chimo-class minelayer in the United States Navy during World War II.

The United States Army mine planter USAMP Colonel John Storey (MP8) was built in 1942 at Point Pleasant, West Virginia for the United States Army Coast Artillery Corps, by the Marietta Manufacturing Company. She was acquired by the U.S. Navy on 7 April 1944, renamed USS Barricade (ACM-3), and commissioned the same day, LT. Charles P. Haber, USN, Commanding. The ship was transferred to the United States Coast Guard and commissioned as USCGC Magnolia (WAGL-328); she was redesignated WLB-328 on 1 September 1965 and served until 1971. She then was sold and operated by Alaskan fishing interests until lost by fire, explosion and sinking in 2002 with loss of three lives.

== Ship's history ==
=== U.S. Navy ===
After commissioning, the U.S. Army mine planter was converted to an auxiliary minelayer by the Norfolk Naval Shipyard and was ready to begin her new role by 29 April 1944. Barricade departed the United States on 14 May 1944 and arrived at Bizerte, Tunisia, where preparations for the invasion of southern France were moving forward. Between June 1944 and the war's end in May 1945, she served as minesweeper tender at Salerno, Naples, Toulon, Oran, Palermo, Golfe Juan, Cannes, Sardinia, and Anzio. Between 17 August and 16 September 1944 she provided important service in the invasion of southern France.

Returning stateside on 23 June 1945, Barricade underwent overhaul in Jacksonville, Florida, from 26 June to 10 August 1945. She was then reassigned to the Pacific Fleet; and, despite the Pacific War's end on 14 August 1945; VJ Day, she loaded supplies and departed Norfolk, Virginia on 27 August 1945. Barricade transited the Panama Canal on 2 September 1945, and reported to San Diego, California on 4 September 1945. From her base at San Diego, California, she worked along the California coast in peacetime operations.

She was decommissioned and transferred to the U.S. Coast Guard on 28 June 1946. She was struck from the Naval Vessel Register on 19 July 1946.

=== U.S. Coast Guard ===
After her acquisition by the U.S. Coast Guard she was converted for use as a buoy tender at the Bethlehem Shipyard in San Francisco. She was commissioned USCGC Magnolia (WAGL-328) on 19 October 1947. She was first assigned to U.S. Coast Guard Base Yerba Buena Island, San Francisco. Her primary duties there were aids to navigation (ATON), servicing light stations and lightships on the California coast, search and rescue, and law enforcement. From 28 to 29 April 1951 she assisted the Japanese MV Flyer. On 9 February 1960 she assisted the disabled MV Angelo Petri two miles south of the San Francisco Bar. On 5 June 1963 she assisted following the collision between the U.S. Navy Military Sea Transportation Service (MSTS) ship USNS Asterion (T-AF-63) and the Japanese merchantman MV Kokoku Maru and transported 19 crew members from the Japanese ship to San Francisco. From 21 to 24 June 1965 she escorted the damaged catamaran SV Judy Al 165 miles southwest of Eureka, California to that port as her hull was too damaged to permit towing. She then transferred to U.S. Coast Guard Base Tongue Point, Astoria, Oregon on 1 September 1965, and redesignated WLB-328. Her primary duties there were aids to navigation (ATON), search and rescue, and law enforcement. She also tended the Columbia River Lightship on the Columbia River Bar. On 6 December 1967 she escorted the distressed MV David E. Day, which had grounded on the Columbia River Bar. On 10 August 1968 she assisted following the collision between MV Seatrain Washington and SS Rose S 17 miles east of Cape Flattery, Washington in heavy fog. Magnolia was decommissioned on 13 August 1971. She was stored at U.S. Coast Guard Training Center (TRACEN) at Government Island, Alameda, California until sold.

=== Commercial ===
In 1976 Magnolia was converted into a crab- and salmon-processing vessel by Marine Industries Northwest for Alaskan sea service. From 1976 to 1997 the ship was owned by Dutch Harbor Seafoods. She was then sold to Galaxy Fisheries and converted into a freezer longliner with the name FPV Galaxy. A fire and explosion, followed by sinking, occurred on 2 October 2002 in the Bering Sea, 30 to 35 miles southwest of St. Paul Island, with two of her crew killed and one lost and presumed dead.

== Awards and honors ==
Barricade earned one battle star for her World War II U.S. Navy service.

== See also ==
- List of ships of the United States Army
- Mine Planter Service (U.S. Army)
