= USS Planter (ACM-2) =

Minelayer in the United States Navy during World War II

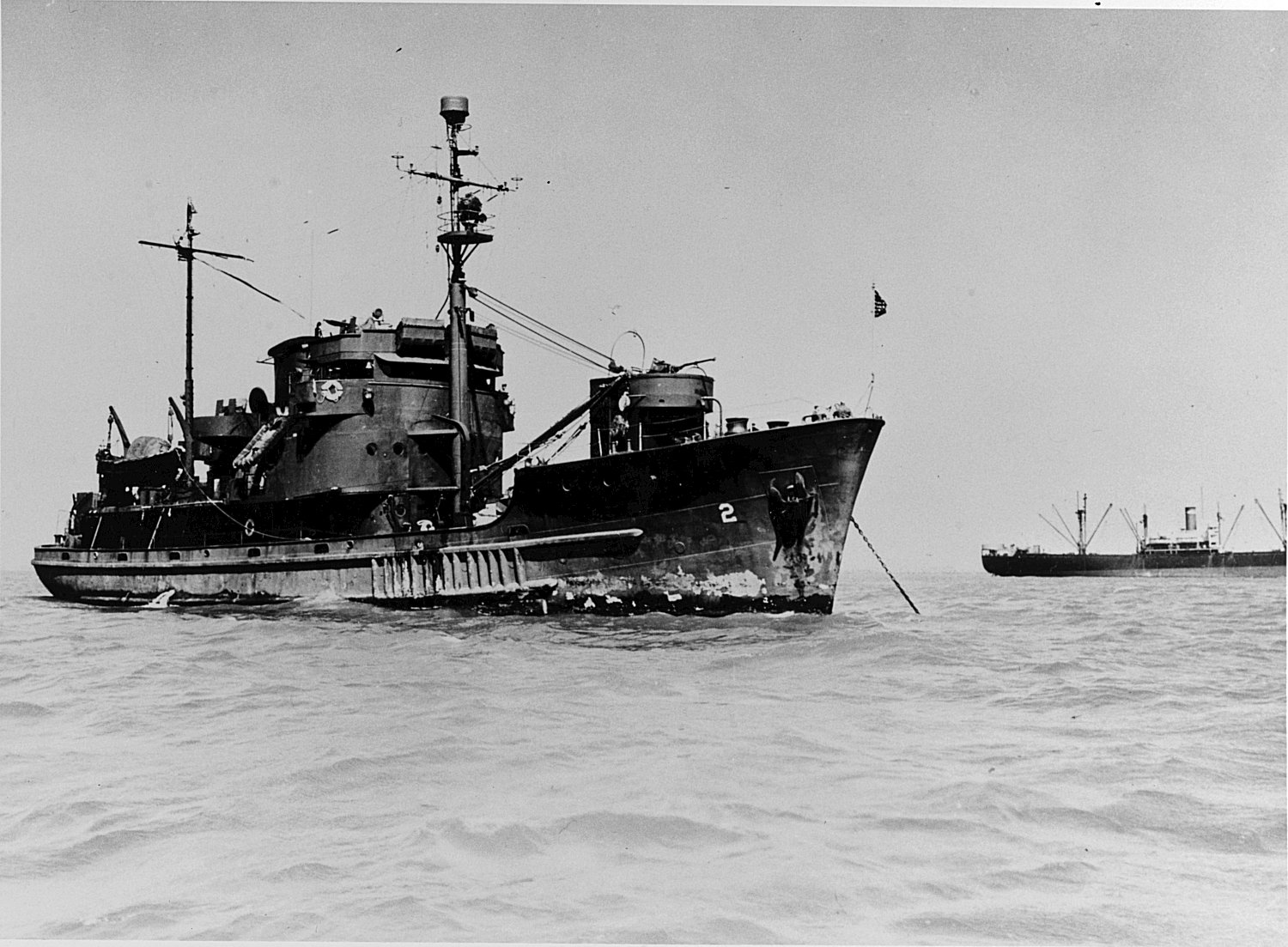
- USS Planter in April 1946

History

United States
- Name: USS Planter (ACM-2)
- Builder: Marietta Manufacturing Company, Point Pleasant, West Virginia
- Laid down: as Colonel George Ricker for the U.S. Army, 1943
- Acquired: 4 April 1944
- Commissioned: 4 April 1944
- Decommissioned: 22 May 1946
- Stricken: 23 December 1947
- Identification: IMO number: 5408506
- Honors and awards: 1 battle star
- Fate: Transferred to the Maritime Commission, 9 April 1948, and later sold

General characteristics
- Class & type: Chimo-class minelayer
- Displacement: 1,300 long tons (1,321 t) full
- Length: 188 ft 2 in (57.35 m)
- Beam: 37 ft (11 m)
- Draft: 12 ft 6 in (3.81 m)
- Speed: 12.5 knots (23.2 km/h; 14.4 mph)
- Complement: 69
- Armament: 1 × 40 mm gun

The second USS Planter (ACM-2) was a Chimo-class minelayer in the United States Navy during World War II.

Planter was built as the U.S. Army mine planter USAMP Col. George Ricker by Marietta Manufacturing Company, Point Pleasant, West Virginia and delivered to the U.S. Army Coast Artillery Corps, Mine Planter Service in 1943. The ship was acquired by the U.S. Navy on 4 April 1944 and commissioned at Norfolk, Virginia, on the same date.

== Service history ==
=== World War II Invasion of Europe operations ===
Planter was assigned to Service Squadron Five, Atlantic Fleet, and got underway in convoy for the Mediterranean, 13 May 1944, reaching the Azores on 24 May, and arriving at Bizerte, Tunisia, 12 June. She continued on to put into Naples, thence to southern France to support minesweeping and buoy laying operations conducted during and after Operation Dragoon. At Toulon, on 1 September, she rescued 31 survivors from YMS–21, sunk by a mine, then resumed her support activities, continuing them until departing for Bizerte 12 November. From the latter she sailed to Cagliari, Sardinia, thence to Oran, en route back to the United States, arriving at Norfolk on 17 January 1945.

=== Pacific Theatre operations ===
Converted to minesweep gear and repair ship at Charleston, she departed for the Canal Zone on 6 April; entered the Pacific for duty with Minecraft, Pacific, 17 April; and reached Pearl Harbor 17 May. Continuing westward, she anchored off Okinawa 4 July to render tender services to YMSs. In August she steamed to the Philippines, where she received news of the war's end. She returned to Okinawa 25 August and remained until 9 December when she got underway for Honshū. Between 13 December and 25 February 1946 she provided mine tender services in Japanese waters, then got underway for the United States, arriving at San Francisco 16 April.

=== Decommissioning ===
Decommissioned 22 May 1946, her name was struck from the Naval Vessel Register on 23 December 1947. On 9 April 1948 she was transferred to the Maritime Commission and was subsequently sold to Foss Launch and Tug Co., Oakland, California.

== Awards ==
Planter received one battle star for World War II service.
