= Radio Ontinyent =

Radio station in Valencia, Spain

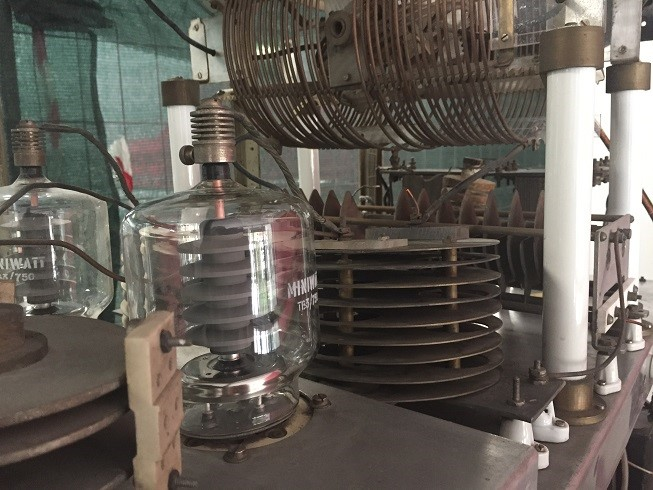
Former broadcasting material, created by Salvador Miquel and currently curated by Museo de la Telecomunicación Vicente Miralles Segarra (UPV).

Radio Ontinyent is a Spanish radio station based in the city of Ontinyent, in the Land of Valencia. It was established in 1923 by Salvador Miquel, self-taught inventor who created a broadcasting device whose signal could be heard by a crystal radio. It was the third station airing in Spain, and got an official license in 1931, being known since as EAJ30 Radio Onteniente, thus making it the 30rd oldest officially licensed radio station in Spain.

In 1933 Miquel improved the broadcasting power, reaching its signal the whole of the Iberian Peninsula, the Balearic Islands and parts of France and Northern Africa. It was sindicated to Radio Intercontinental and, in 1987, it would be absorbed by the Sociedad Española de Radiodifusión. It won an Ondas award in 2019. In 2024, the Miquel family sold the company to a new owner.
