= USS Obstructor =

Minelayer in the United States Navy during World War II

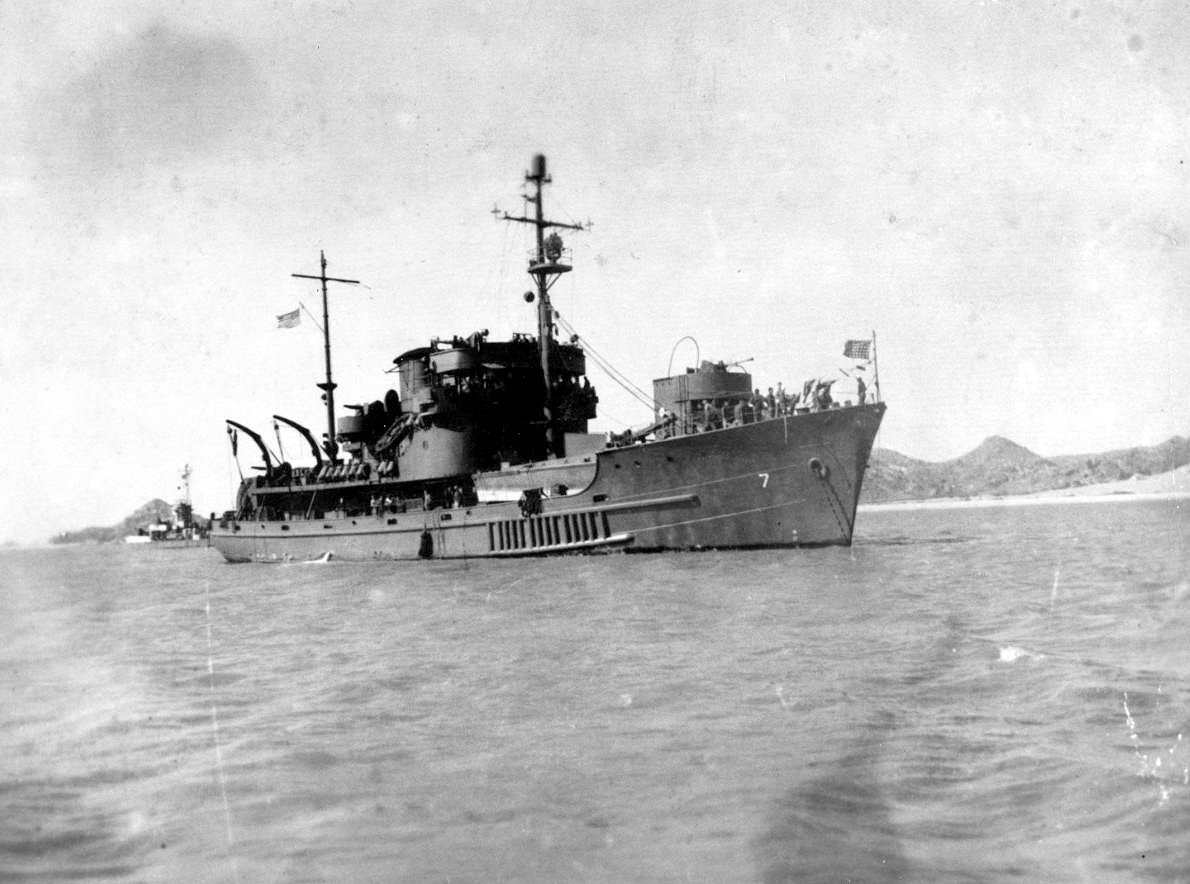
- Obstructor anchored off Hong Kong in the fall of 1945

History

United States
- Name: USS Obstructor (ACM-7)
- Builder: Marietta Manufacturing Company, Point Pleasant, West Virginia
- Laid down: as USAMP 1st Lt. William G. Sylvester (MP-5) for the U.S. Army
- Acquired: 4 January 1945
- Commissioned: 1 April 1945
- Decommissioned: 28 June 1946
- Renamed: Obstructor, 19 January 1945
- Stricken: 19 July 1946
- Fate: Transferred to the Coast Guard, 28 June 1946, commissioned 1 February 1947 as USCGC Heather (WABL / WLB-331); Decommissioned USCG 15 December 1967
- Notes: Transferred to Seattle, 12 April 1968

General characteristics
- Class & type: Chimo-class minelayer
- Displacement: 880 long tons (894 t)
- Length: 188 ft 2 in (57.35 m)
- Beam: 37 ft (11 m)
- Draft: 12 ft 6 in (3.81 m)
- Speed: 12.5 knots (23.2 km/h; 14.4 mph)
- Complement: 69
- Armament: 1 × 40 mm gun

USS Obstructor (ACM-7) was a Chimo-class minelayer in the United States Navy during World War II.

Built by the Marietta Manufacturing Company in Point Pleasant, West Virginia, as a U.S. Army mine planter, USAMP 1st Lt. William G. Sylvester (MP-5) was delivered in December 1942 to the U.S. Army Coast Artillery Corps, Mine Planter Service. She was named for the first coast artillery officer killed (at Hickam Field, Hawaii, on 7 December 1941) in action in World War II. Sylvester's embarked crew, designated, in Army terminology as the 12th Coast Artillery Mine Planter Battery, was implemented in November 1942 stationed at Fort Miles, Delaware.

The ship was transferred to the Navy on 4 January 1945. She was renamed Obstructor on 19 January 1945, converted at the Charleston Navy Yard and commissioned on 1 April 1945.

After transfer to the United States Coast Guard in 1946 the ship was commissioned 1 February 1947 as USCGC Heather until 15 December 1967.

== U.S. Navy service history ==
=== Pacific Theatre operations ===
Following shakedown in Chesapeake Bay, Obstructor, a minesweep gear and repair ship, loaded gear and other supplies at Norfolk, Virginia, and sailed on 11 June 1945 for the Panama Canal. Transiting the canal on 21 June 1945, she proceeded up the coast to San Diego. There at the end of the war, she sailed for the Far East on 18 August 1945. Steaming via the Marshalls and the Marianas, she arrived at Manila and reported for duty with MinRon 106 on 8 October 1945. On 17 October 1945 she got underway for Haiphong, arriving and joining task unit TU 74.4 on 22 October 1945. Assuming duties as flagship, MinRon 106, the same day, Obstructor served as a minesweeper tender for that task unit as it operated off Haiphong harbor, the island of Hainan and off Chinese ports during the next six months.

=== Decommissioning ===
In early May 1946, she sailed east en route back to the United States. Arriving at San Francisco on 15 June 1946, she was decommissioned and was transferred to the U.S. Coast Guard on 28 June 1946 and was struck from the Navy List on 19 July 1946.

== U.S. Coast Guard service history ==
The second tender named Heather; one of the five Chimo-Class Army minelayers acquired by the U.S. Coast Guard, was commissioned in service with the Coast Guard on 1 February 1947. USCGC Heather (WAGL / WLB-331) was stationed at Mobile, Alabama and was assigned to tend Aids to Navigation (ATON) and conduct Search and Rescue (SAR) operations as needed. She served out of Mobile until 5 December 1949.

On 23 July 1949 she assisted a sinking barge off Isle aux Herbes (Alabama). On 6 December 1949 she began operations out of San Pedro, Los Angeles. In addition to tending ATON, she participated in numerous SAR operations as well as other duties.

On 9 February 1953 she escorted the M/V Greece Victory into San Francisco, California. On 23 April 1956 she escorted the P/C Avalon to San Pedro, California. From May to June 1957 she patrolled outboard races in Los Angeles harbor.

On 19 July 1960 Heather assisted following a deadly collision off Newport Beach, California between the USS Ammen (DD-527) and USS Collett (DD-730) as Ammen was in transit between Seal Beach and San Diego, California.

From 15 to 16 March 1961 she rescued the Greek M/V Dominator off Palos Verdes Point, California and transported survivors to San Pedro. On 19 May 1961 she assisted in raising the sunken CG-40453. On 22 May 1966 she salvaged a U.S. Coast Guard helicopter that had crashed 96 miles off San Diego, California.

After 3 years of U.S. Army, 1 year of U.S. Navy and 20 years of U.S. Coast Guard service Heather was finally decommissioned on 15 December 1967 and transferred to Seattle, Washington on 12 April 1968.

== See also ==
- List of ships of the United States Army
- USCG Seagoing Buoy Tender
