= Bodegas Los Frailes =

Bodegas Los Frailes (Bodegas Los Frailes SL) is a Spanish wine producer and seller company located in Fontanars dels Alforins (Valencia). The cellar, whose origins date back to the eighteenth century, produces and sells wines from their own vineyards with the Geographical Indication (GI) “Valencia”. Most of the production is exported to Germany, Switzerland, Denmark, the United States, Sweden and Norway.

== History ==
The winemaking tradition dates back to 1771, after the Suppression of the Society of Jesus (1767) and the expropriation of “Heredad de la Concepcion”, the rural estate acquired by the ancestors of the current owner family. Since the 18th century vine crops have been combined with sheep farming. Formerly, the wine produced was stored in the old cellar formed by buried clay amphorae.

In 1999 "Bodegas Los Frailes" was founded to create quality wine through the organic cultivation of Monastrell grapes, the native variety linked to the monasteries, and other native varieties such as Garnacha Tintorera; Cabernet Sauvignon, Tempranillo, Syrah and Marselán were introduced later.

Currently the warehouse has stainless steel tanks and new oenological technology. The old winery has been recovered for the aging of the wines in concrete tanks and clay jars in a room of buried barrels.

== Organic agriculture ==
The transformation to organic agriculture involved the incorporation of biological methods of pest control and rejection of systemic herbicides. The crops are fertilized with organic manure from extensive livestock and their herd of sheep. The cultivation and growth of the vineyards is done through the process of biodynamic agriculture, created by Rudolf Steiner. All vineyards and wines are certified by organic farming. With 130 hectares of own vineyard, belongs to the Association of wine growers and producers "Terres dels Alforins".

Wines produced with assemblages between different grapes: Los frailes, Bilogía, Trilogía, Moma, 1771, After 3; being awarded several times by Guía Peñín, Biofach, Concours Mondial de Bruxelles, Robert Parker and the International Wine Cellar, among others.
