= El Bonillo =

Coordinates: 38°57′N 2°32′W

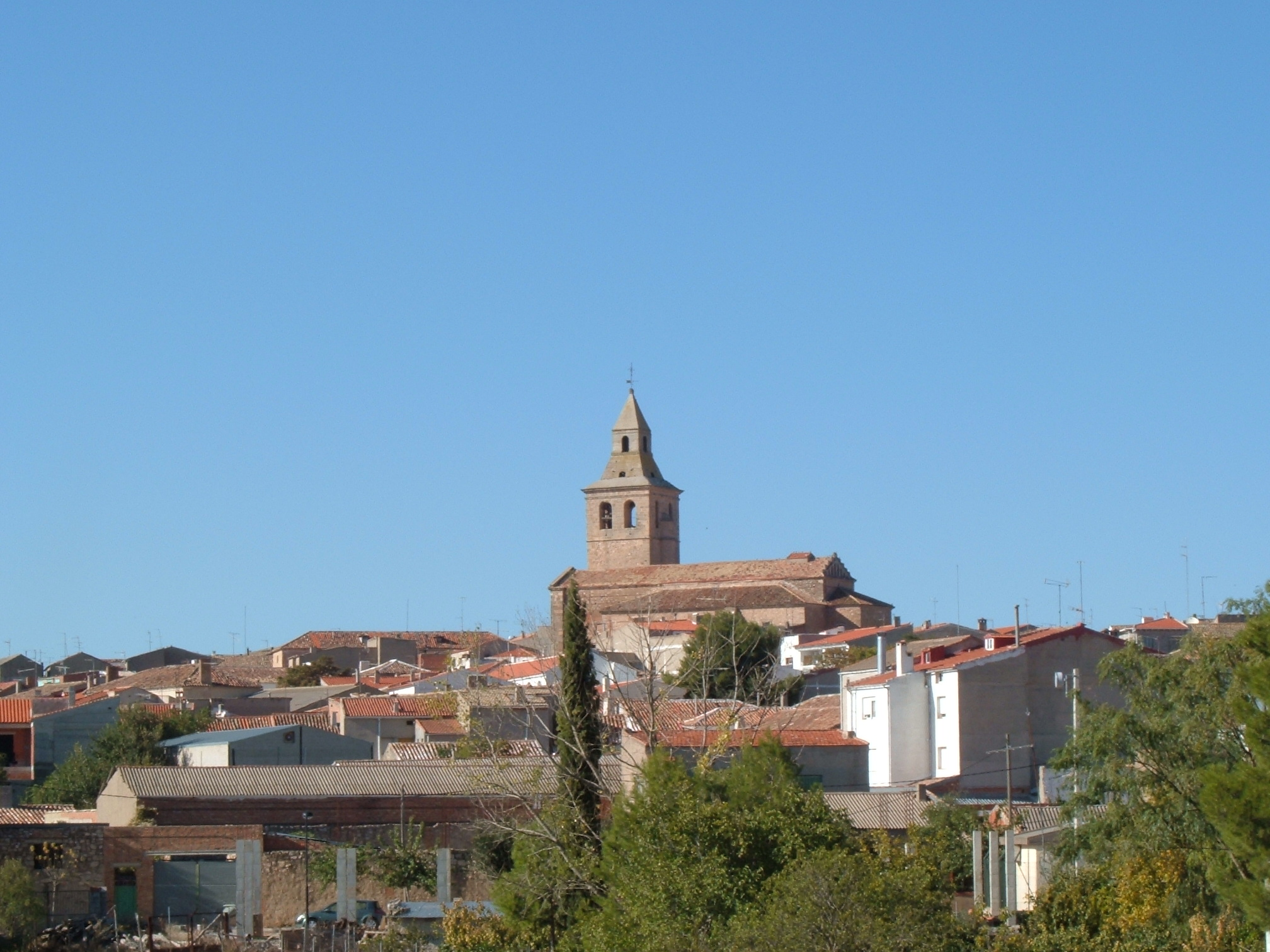
El Bonillo Municipal, Spain

Coat of arms of El Bonillo

El Bonillo is a municipality in Albacete, Castile-La Mancha, Spain. It has a population of 2,651 as of 2023. The historic Church of Santa Catalina stands in the town.
