= USNS Asterion =

Cargo ship of the United States Navy

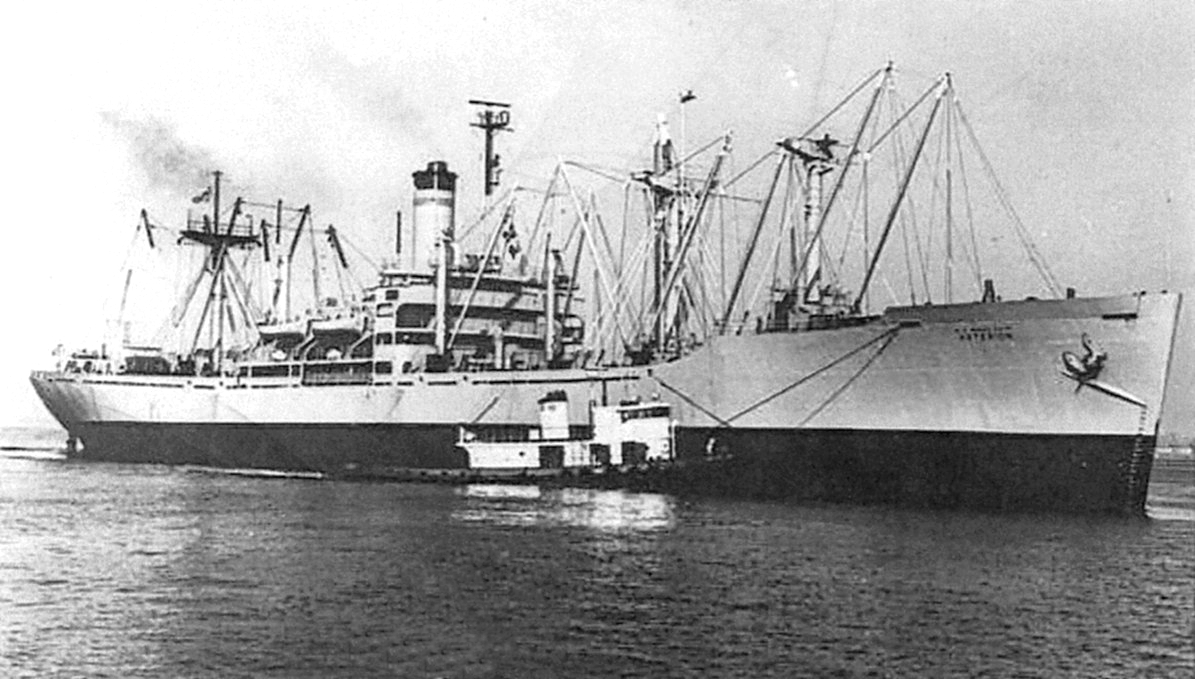

History

United States
- Name: SS Arcadia Victory
- Namesake: Arcadia, California
- Owner: War Shipping Administration
- Operator: American President Lines
- Builder: California Shipbuilding Corporation, Los Angeles California.
- Laid down: 10 June 1944
- Launched: 27 July 1944
- Sponsored by: Mrs. James T Wishart
- Completed: 22 September 1944
- Decommissioned: 1952
- Fate: Transferred to U.S. Navy, 12 November 1961

United States
- Name: USNS Asterion
- Owner: U.S. Navy MSTS, (MSC).
- Operator: U.S. Navy MSTS, (MSC).
- Acquired: 7 November 1961
- Notes: Converted to refrigerated store ship, 1961
- In service: September 1962
- Out of service: 8 June 1973
- Stricken: 15 June 1973
- Fate: Sold for scrap, 31 August 1973

General characteristics
- Class & type: VC2-S-AP3 Victory ship
- Tonnage: 7612 GRT, 4,553 NRT
- Displacement: 15,200 tons
- Length: 455 ft (139 m)
- Beam: 62 ft (19 m)
- Draught: 28 ft (8.5 m)
- Installed power: 8,500 shp (6,300 kW)
- Propulsion: HP & LP turbines geared to a single 20.5-foot (6.2 m) propeller
- Speed: 16.5 knots
- Boats & landing craft carried: 4 Lifeboats
- Complement: 62 Merchant Marine and 28 US Naval Armed Guards
- Armament: 1 × 5 inch (127 mm)/38 caliber gun; 1 × 3 inch (76 mm)/50 caliber gun; 8 × 20 mm Oerlikon

The SS Arcadia Victory was a Victory ship built during World War II for cargo shipping. She was launched by the California Shipbuilding Company on 1 July 1944 and completed on 22 September 1944. The ship's United States Maritime Commission designation was VC2- S- AP3, hull number 41.

In 1961 she was rebuilt as a Denebola-class stores ship and renamed USNS Asterion (T-AF-63). Her task was to carry stores, refrigerated items, and equipment to ships in the fleet, and to remote stations and staging areas.

== War ==
Arcadia Victory served in both World War II and the Korean War as cargo ship.

== Pre-recommissioning activity ==
The second vessel to be named Asterion by the US Navy, AF-63 was laid down under a United States Maritime Commission contract (MCV hull 41) on 10 June 1944 at Los Angeles, California, by the California Shipbuilding Corporation., as Arcadia Victory. Launched on 27 July 1944 and sponsored by Mrs. James T. Wishart, Arcadia Victory was delivered to her operators, the American President Lines (APL), on 3 September 1944. She operated under the APL shipping line's flag until laid up late in 1952.

== Acquired by the Navy ==
Removed from the National Defense Reserve Fleet berthing area at Suisun Bay, California, on 7 November 1961, Arcadia Victory was acquired by the US Navy from the United States Maritime Commissionon 12 November 1961. Renamed Asterion and classified as a store ship, AF-63, on 4 December 1961, the ship was taken to the Willamette Iron and Steel Company. of Portland, Oregon, where she underwent conversion to a refrigerated stores ship.

== Assigned to MSTS ==
Placed in service with the US Navy's Military Sea Transportation Service, (MSTS) (later Military Sealift Command, (MSC) in September 1962 as USNS Asterion (T-AF-63), the ship operated in the MSTS (later, MSC), Pacific Area, delivering fresh and frozen foods to Pacific and Far Eastern ports. On 5 June 1963, Asterion suffered minor damage to her bow in a collision off San Francisco, California, with the Japanese freighter MV Kokoku Maru. The USCGC Magnolia (WLB-328) from US Coast Guard Base Yerba Buena Island San Francisco California responded to the vessels distress calls and provided assistance for both ships. The MV Kokoku Maru sustained heavy damage, and the USCGC Magnolia (WLB-328) evacuated 19 her crew to San Francisco California.

Carrying "everything from steak and spuds, to mobile cranes and dynamite," Asterion; the winner of the MSTS "Smart Ship Award" in 1967, operated in the Pacific Ocean for the next decade; her ports of call ranged from Settahip, Thailand, and Saigon, South Vietnam, to Seattle, Washington, San Francisco, and Yokohama. As American involvement in the Vietnam War grew, Asterion's itinerary included the ports of Qui Nhon, Cam Ranh Bay, and Danang.

== Decommissioning ==
Asterion arrived at Yokohama on 8 June 1973 from her last voyage as a "reefer ship" and her name was struck from the Navy list on 15 June 1973. Transferred, at Yokohama Japan, to the Maritime Administration for disposal, she was sold to N. W. Kennedy, Ltd., of Vancouver, British Columbia, Canada, on 31 August 1973. Resold to Far Eastern shipbreakers for scrapping in 1973.

== See also ==
- List of United States Navy ships
- Cargo ship
- List of Victory ships
- Liberty ship
- Type C1 ship
- Type C2 ship
- Type C3 ship
