= Altiplanicie de Almansa =

Comarca of the Province of Albacete, Spain

Altiplanicie de Almansa is a comarca of the Province of Albacete, Spain.
