= Fontanars dels Alforins =

- Municipality
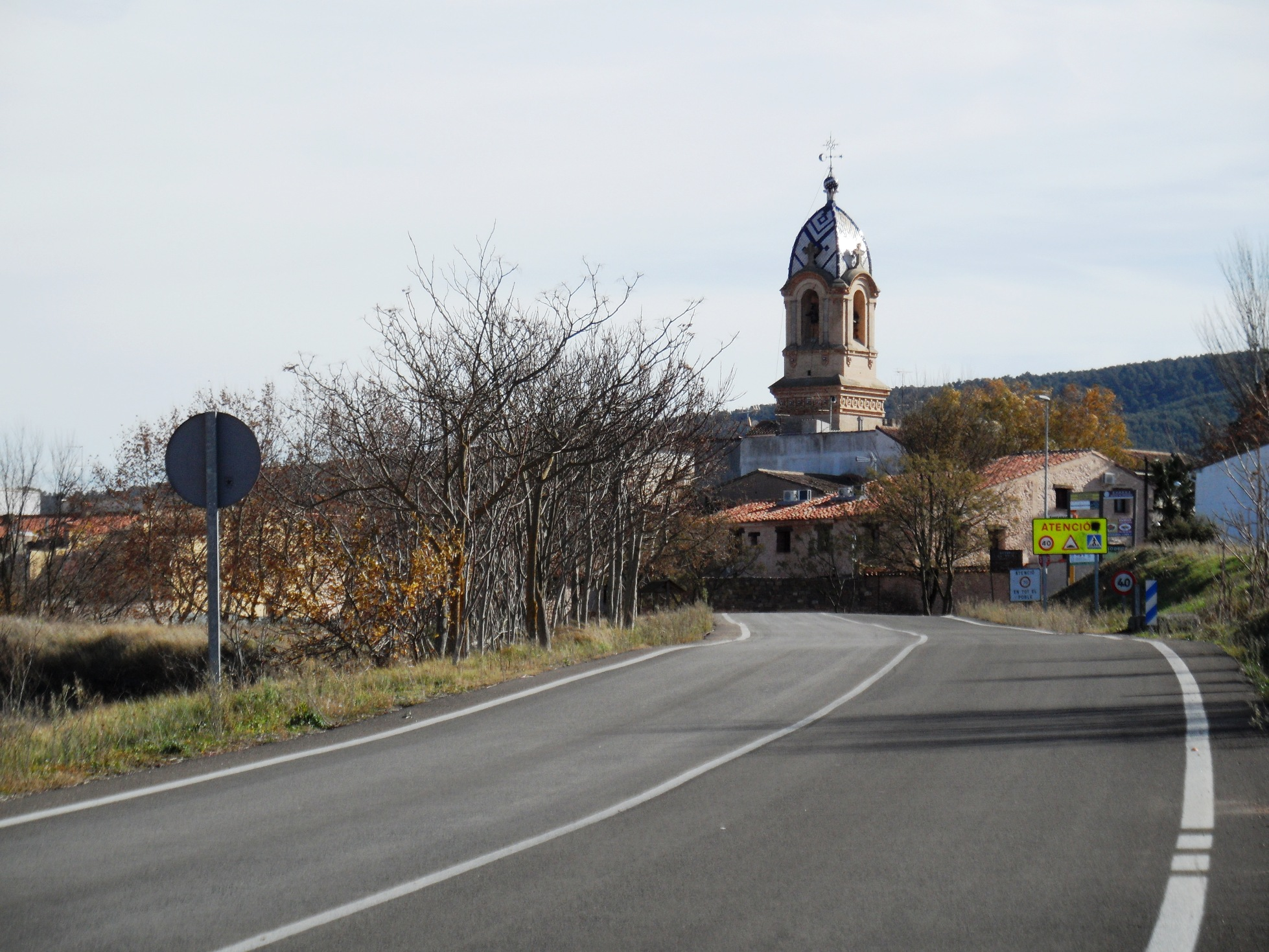

- Coat of arms

- Location in Spain
- Coordinates: 38°47′0″N 0°47′6″W
- Country: Spain
- Autonomous community: Valencian Community
- Province: Valencia
- Comarca: Vall d'Albaida
- Judicial district: Ontinyent

Government
  - Alcalde: Julio Biosca Llin (Compromís)

Area
  - Total: 74.7 km^{2} (28.8 sq mi)
- Elevation: 600 m (2,000 ft)

Population (2025-01-01)
  - Total: 936
  - Density: 12.5/km^{2} (32.5/sq mi)
- Demonym(s): Alforiner, alforinera
- Time zone: UTC+1 (CET)
  - Summer (DST): UTC+2 (CEST)
- Postal code: 46635
- Official language(s): Valencian
- Website: Official website

Fontanars dels Alforins (Spanish: Fontanares) is a municipality in the comarca of Vall d'Albaida in the Valencian Community, Spain. It lies in the Alhorines Valley.

== See also ==
- List of municipalities in Valencia
