= Church of Santa Catarina (Calheta) =

- Church of Saint Catherine of Alexandria
- Igreja de Santa Catarina
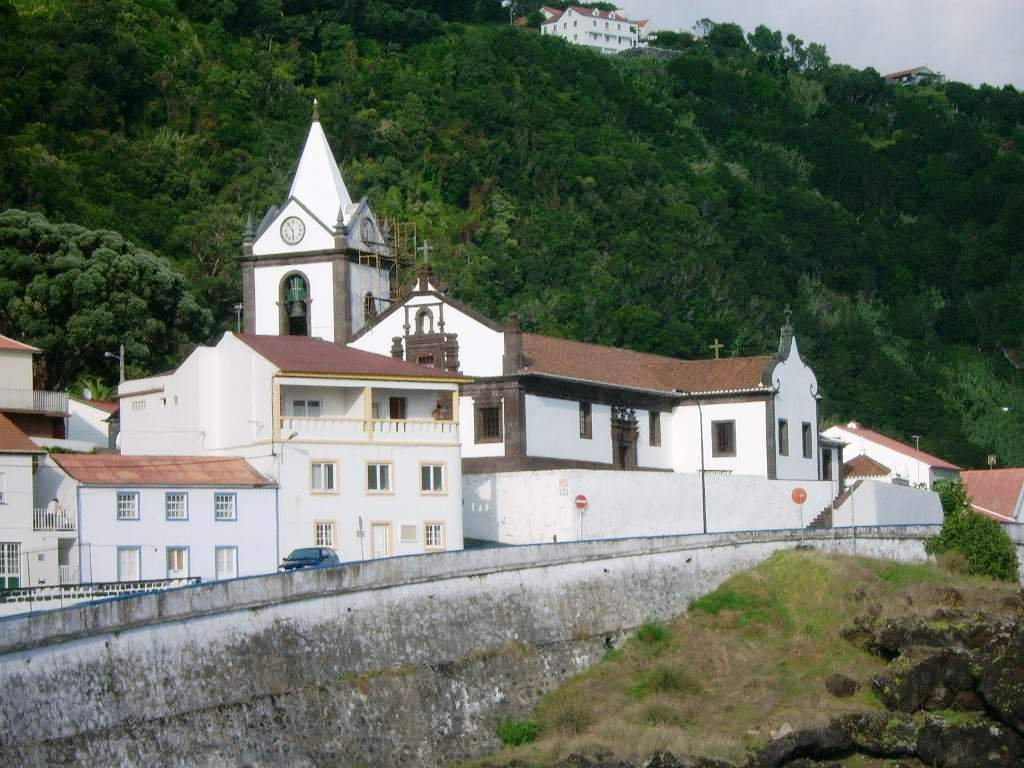
- Partial view of the Church of Santa Catarina
- Church of Santa Catarina
- 38°36′2.91″N 28°0′47.46″W
- Location: São Jorge, Central, Azores
- Country: Portugal
- Denomination: Roman Catholic

Architecture
- Style: Baroque

Administration
- Diocese: Diocese of Angra

The Church of Santa Catarina (Portuguese: Igreja de Santa Catarina) is a church in the civil parish of Calheta, municipality of Calheta, on the Portuguese island of São Jorge, archipelago of the Azores.

== History ==
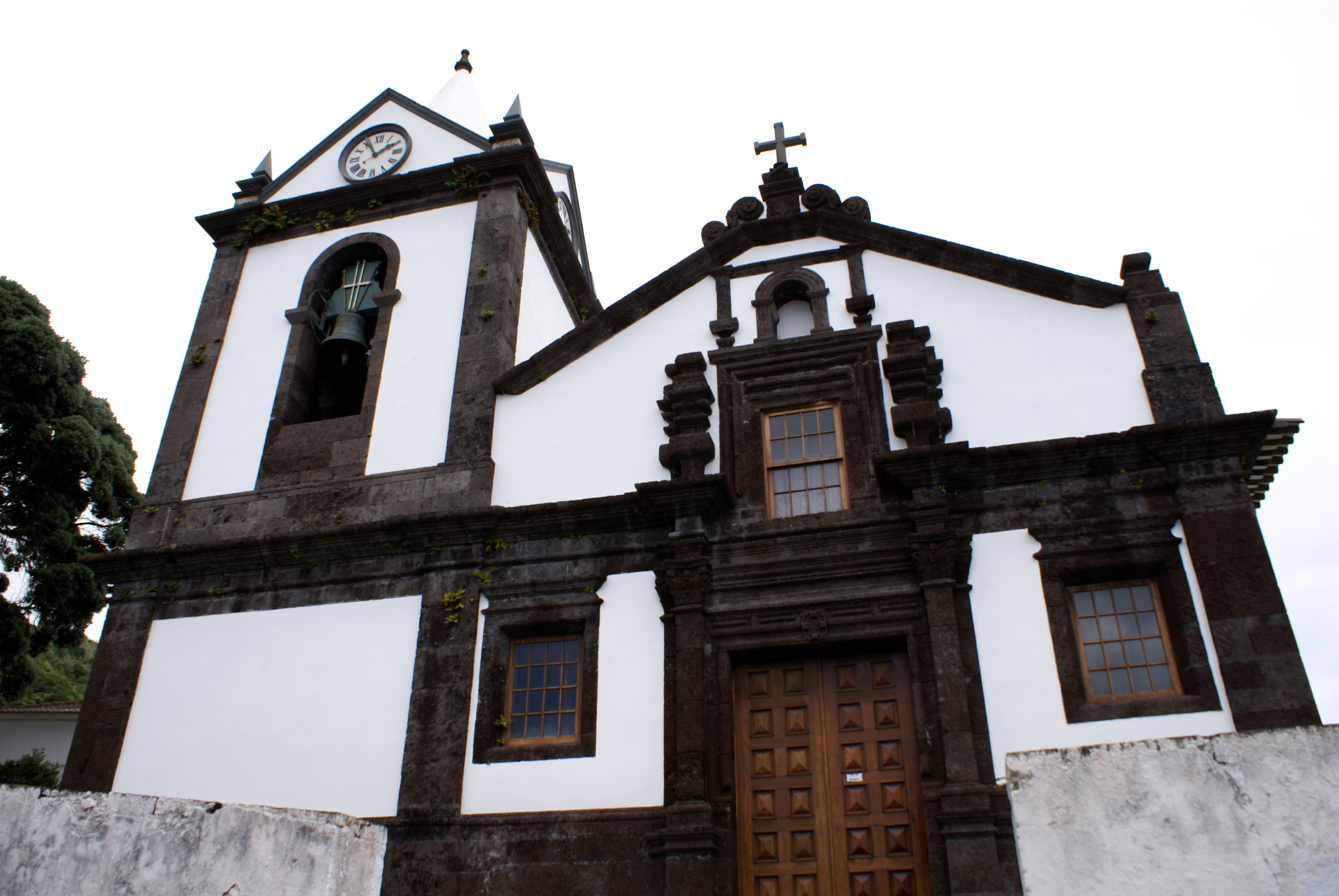
The facade of the parish church constructed in 1639

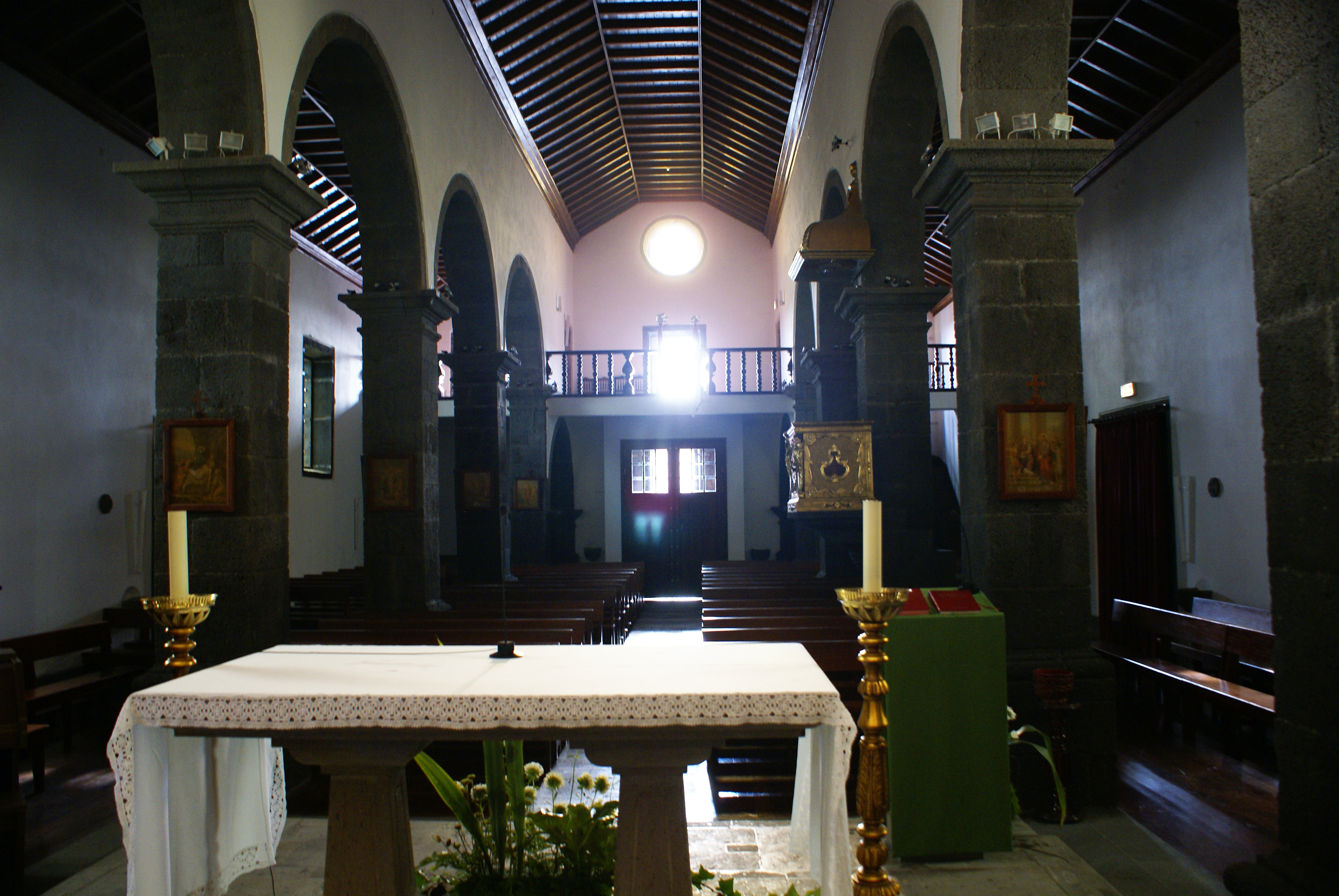
The interior of the single-nave church showing the multiple arched pillars

On 3 June 1534, the municipality of Calheta was separated from that of the neighbouring administration of Velas, and the village of Calheta was elevated to the status of town by King John III of Portugal. Construction began on 8 January 1639 after the original 16th-century building was destroyed by fire. The chronicler Friar Agostinho de Monte Alverne wrote of the incident, noting that all was destroyed except the main body and the sacramental bread. To mark the occasion, the municipal council of Calheta decided to commemorate the event with a procession, ritual mass and sermon in 1664. These commemorative rituals were later provided for in the testaments of Captain-Major Bartolomeu Pereira and his grandson, Father José Soares de Sousa.

The new church was built away from the sea on the site of a small chapel dedicated to Saint Catherine (Portuguese: Santa Catarina) which was destroyed during a volcanic eruption. It is believed that the construction of the current Church of Santa Catarina was begun in the 17th century. Building lasted for a considerable period and was only completed around 1763 as a result of the Mandado de Deus earthquake, which hit the island on 9 July 1757. The church did not have a baptismal font until 1664 when it was provided by visiting parish priest António Pires de Serpa.

On 4 October 1945, the church was damaged by an ocean swell (some say tsunami). Major damage also occurred on 1 January 1980 as a result of the Azores earthquake which affected many of the islands of the Central Group, destroying much of Angra do Heroísmo. Plans for remodelling were prepared in the late 1980s and the church was reopened in 1991.

== Architecture ==
The church is located in the centre of the built-up area of the village of Calheta. On a platform located to the rear of the church the local community constructed an império, a religious building used in the Festivals of the Holy Spirit. The single-nave church is in the form of a cross, with a lateral transept, and has a belltower with a four-faceted clock. Inside, there is an apse in gilded wood with images of Saint Catherine (one from the small 16th century building, the other from the 17th century), and a valuable candelabra.

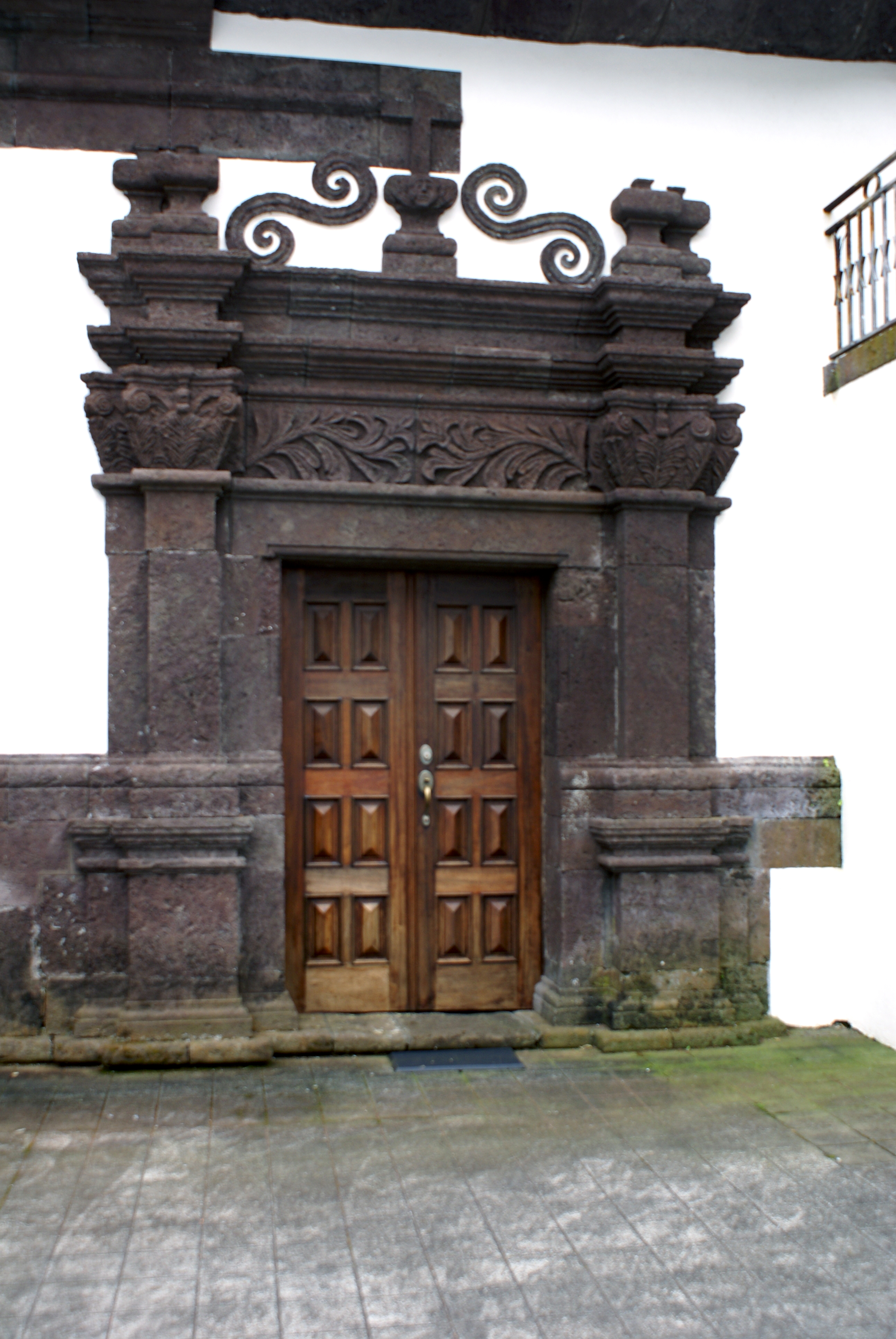
The lateral doorway in sculpted basalt

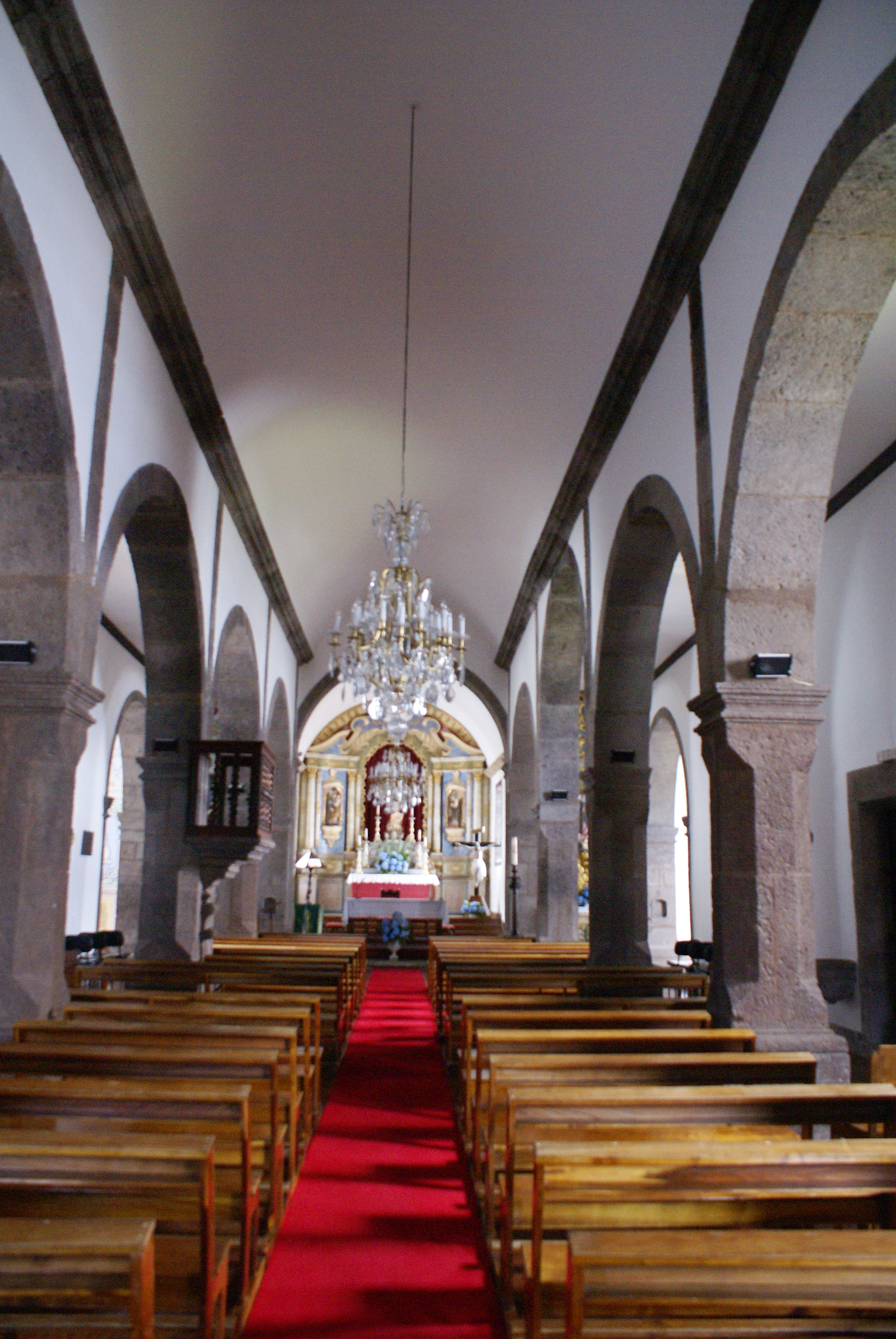
The central nave of the church

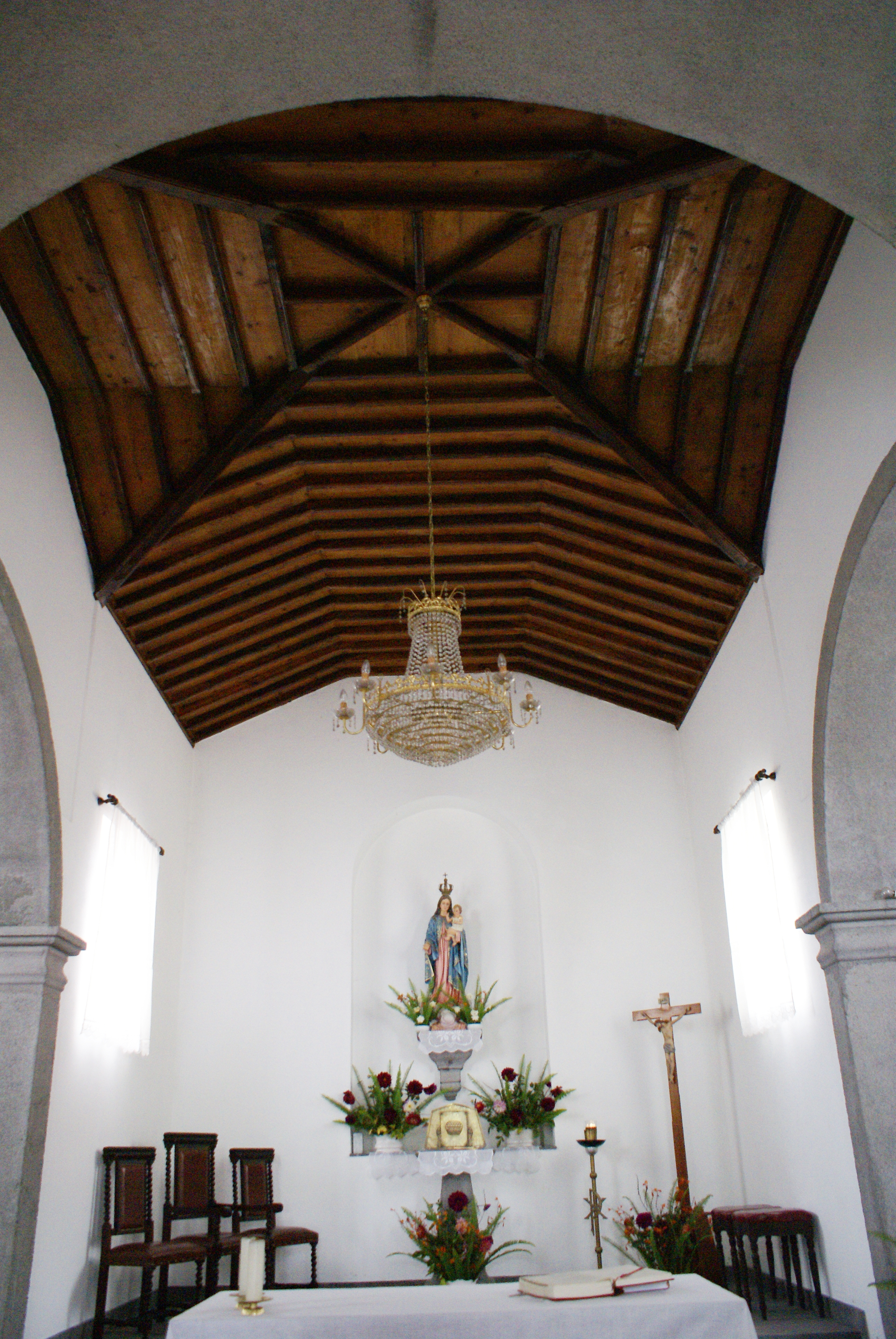
The wood vaulted ceiling in the apse
