= Chimo (music) =

Iberian festival march

- March by José María Ferrero Pastor
- Published: 1964

Chimo, March of the Moors, Ontinyent (2015)

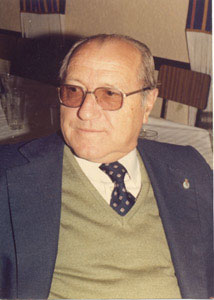
Composer José María Ferrero Pastor (1926-1987)

Chimo (Marxa mora, march of the Moors) is a march and an integral part of the fiestas Moros i Cristians in Ontinyent, for which it is considered a kind of anthem. It was composed especially for this purpose by José María Ferrero Pastor in 1964 and is also used in the performance of Moros i Cristians in other places.

The composition was considered a significant enrichment of the fiestas and was appreciated in Spanish, Moroccan and Arabic media. With this particular melody, Ferrero gave a romantic, medieval, Arabic framework to the historical conflicts between Moors and Christians in the Iberian Peninsula.

The work has been recorded several times by the Societat Unió Artística Musical d'Ontinyent, whose director José María Ferrero Pastor was for 37 years until his tragic death in 1987.

Along with the Paquito el Chocolatero, it is the most played piece of the fiestas in the Valencià region.
