= Church of Santa Catalina (Caudete) =

- Iglesia de Santa Catalina (Spanish)
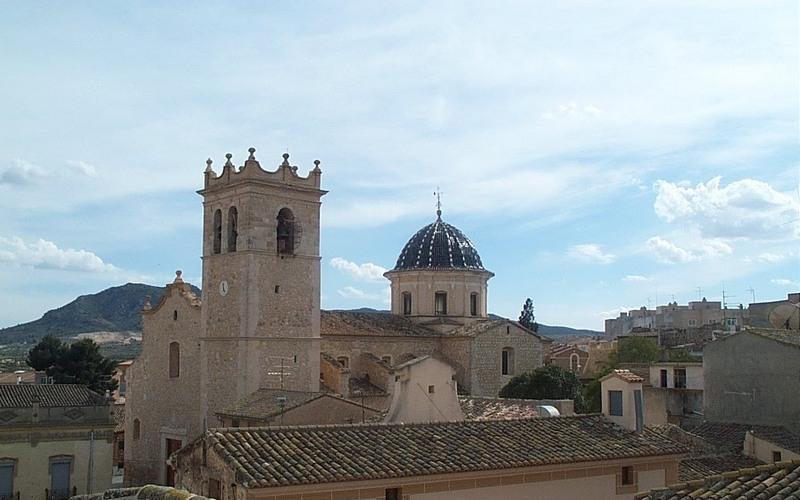

- Location within Spain
- 38.703019°N 0.989479°W
- Location: Caudete, Spain

Spanish Cultural Heritage
- Official name: Iglesia de Santa Catalina
- Type: Non-movable
- Criteria: Monument
- Designated: 1992
- Reference no.: RI-51-0007361

The Church of Santa Catalina (Spanish: Iglesia de Santa Catalina) is a church located in Caudete, Spain. The church was constructed between the 15th and 18th centuries. It was declared Bien de Interés Cultural in 1992.
