= Church of Santa Catalina (El Bonillo) =

- Iglesia Parroquial de Santa Catalina (Spanish)
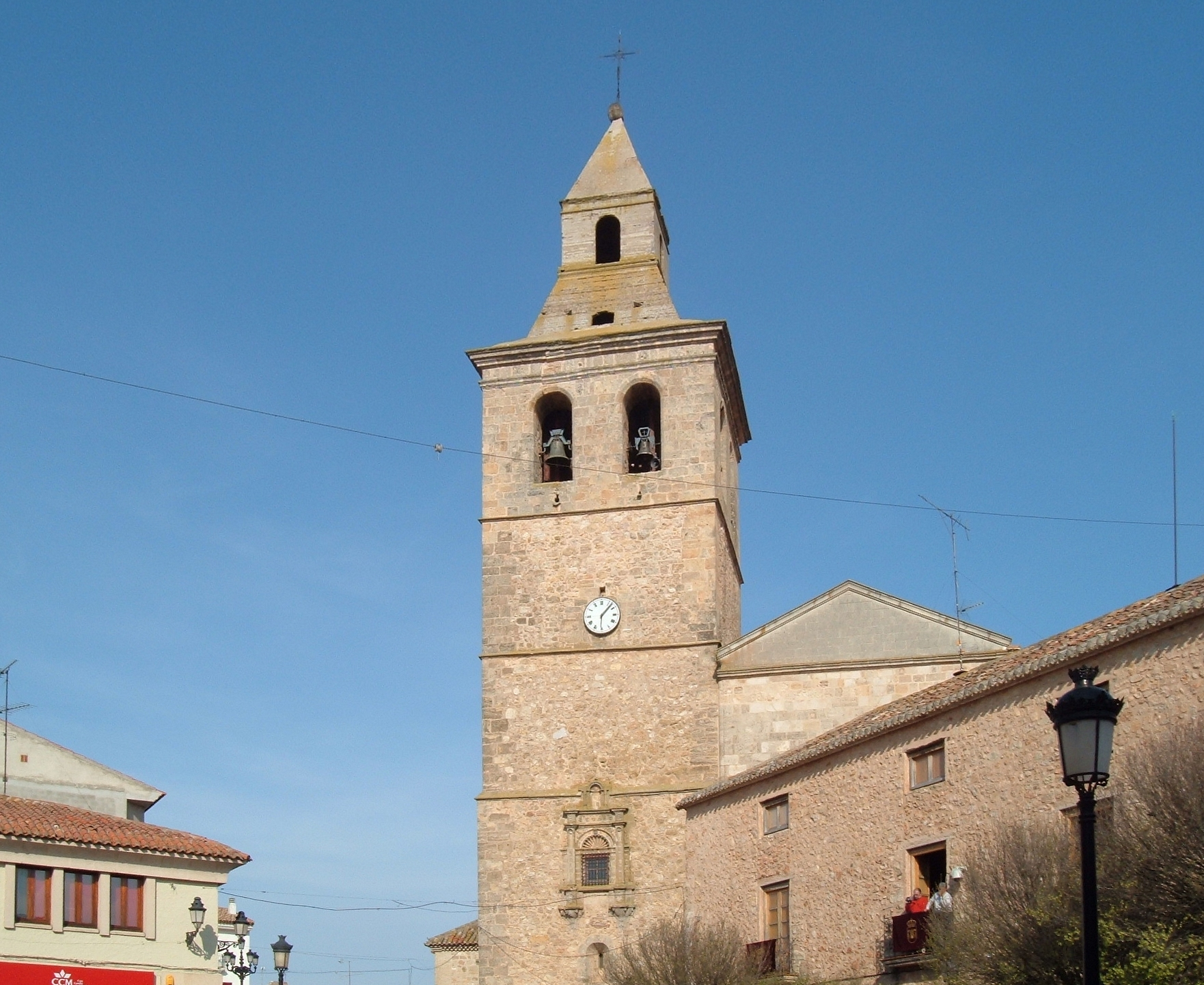

- Location within Spain
- 38.950569°N 2.539865°W
- Location: El Bonillo, Spain

Spanish Cultural Heritage
- Official name: Iglesia Parroquial de Santa Catalina
- Type: Non-movable
- Criteria: Monument
- Designated: 1992
- Reference no.: RI-51-0007359

The Church of Santa Catalina (Spanish: Iglesia Parroquial de Santa Catalina) is a church located in El Bonillo, Spain. It was declared Bien de Interés Cultural in 1992.

The church was erected on an earlier structure, with the present edifice begun in 1699. The main retablo was begun in 1733. The present organ, now repaired, dates from the late 18th century.

The parish museum has a Christ hugging the Cross by El Greco; a Christ of the Miracles by Vicente López Portaña, and a St Peter and St Vincent Ferrer attributed to Giuseppe Ribera.
