= Ontinyent =

Ontinyent Onteniente
- Town and municipality
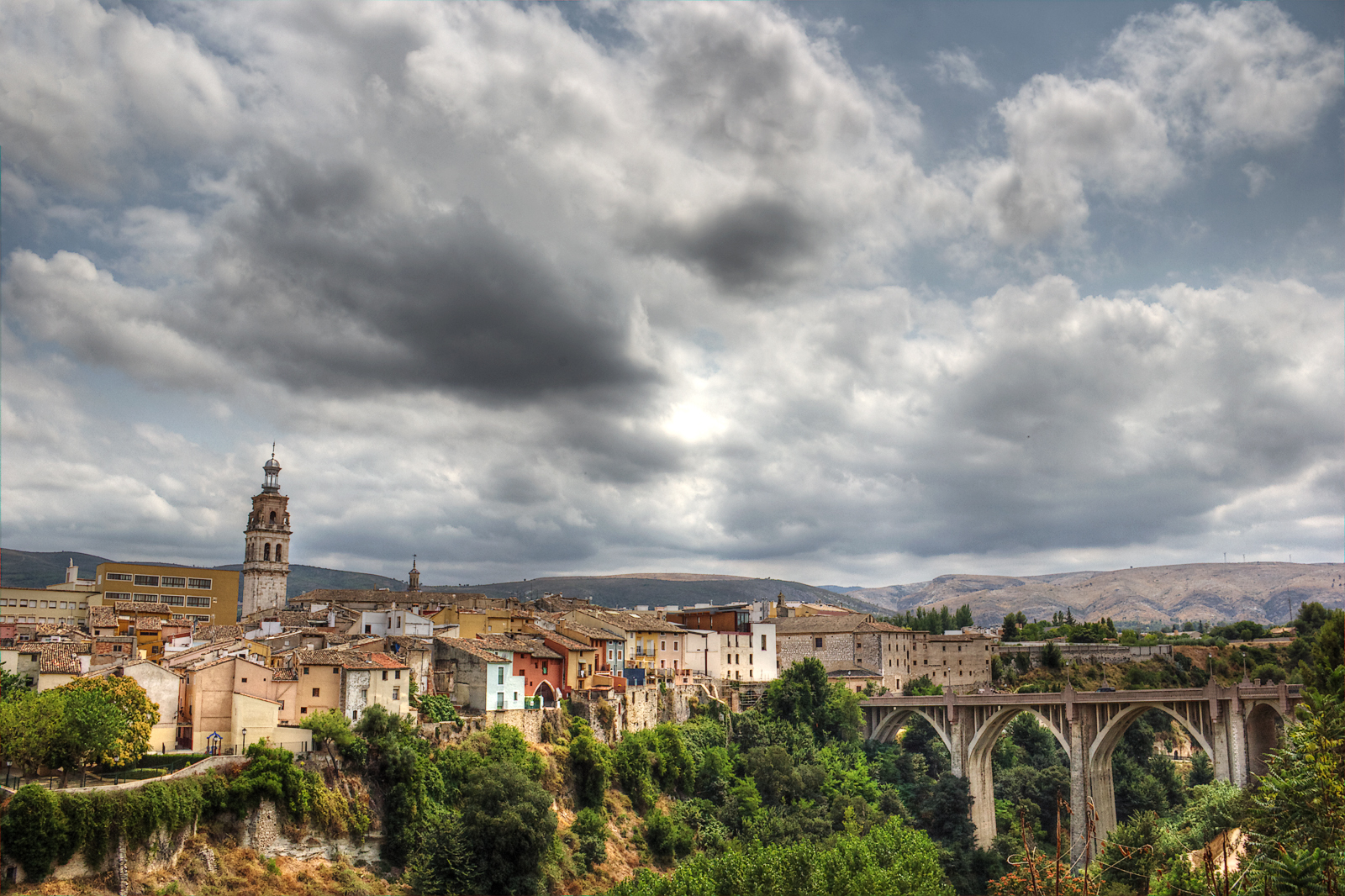

- Flag Coat of arms

- Location in Spain Ontinyent (Valencian Community) Ontinyent (Spain)
- Coordinates: 38°49′20″N 0°36′26″W
- Country: Spain
- Autonomous community: Valencian Community
- Province: Valencia
- Comarca: Vall d'Albaida
- Judicial district: Ontinyent

Government
  - Alcalde (Mayor): Jorge Rodríguez Gramage (2011) (PSPV-PSOE)

Area
  - Total: 125.43 km^{2} (48.43 sq mi)
- Elevation: 382 m (1,253 ft)

Population (2025-01-01)
  - Total: 37,012
  - Density: 295.08/km^{2} (764.26/sq mi)
- Demonyms: • ontinyentí, -ina (Val.) • ontiñentino/a, also onteniense (Sp.)
- Official language(s): Valencian; Spanish
- Linguistic area: Valencian
- Time zone: UTC+1 (CET)
  - Summer (DST): UTC+2 (CEST)
- Postal code: 46870
- Website: Official website

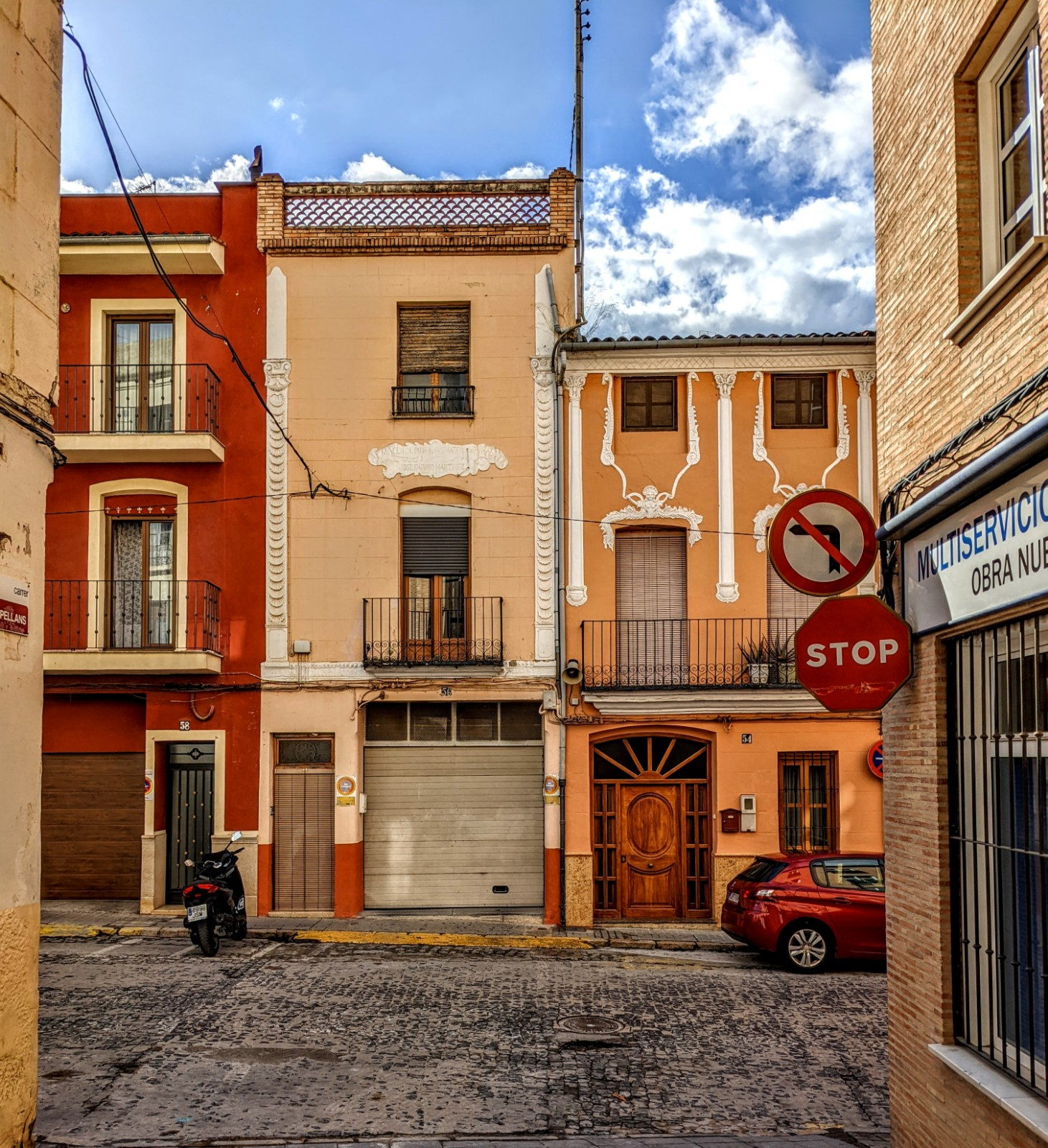
Colourful houses in the historic Sant Antoni neighbourhood.

Ontinyent, (Note: Pronunciation of Ontinyent: Valencian: [ontiˈɲent]) in Valencian (known in Spanish as Onteniente), (Note: Pronunciation of Onteniente (unofficial): Spanish: [onteˈnjente]) is a town and municipality in the comarca of Vall d'Albaida, Valencian Community, Spain. It is situated on the banks of the Clarià River, a tributary of the Xúquer, and on the Xàtiva–Alcoi railway. Ontinyent is near the Serra de Mariola Natural Park.

Ontinyent is a historic city featuring many baroque churches, aristocratic mansions, city walls, the palace of the Dukes of Almodòver and a 16th-century bridge alongside newer apartment buildings and modern retail. The city has been known for its production of cloth, paper, brandy, furniture and earthenware as well as its trade in cereals, wine, almonds and olive oil.

Juan Roig, Spanish billionaire and president of Mercadona, went to school in Ontinyent.

== History ==
Evidence of human settlement in the area was traced back the end of the Neolithic period, as shown by evidences from excavations at the Castellar site between the Barranco dels Tarongers and the Barranco del Averno in Bocairent.

Sites occupied during the Roman era are short-lived. Small agricultural settlements were located on the outskirts of what would later become the medieval urban core. It seems likely one of these Roman settlements gave rise to the name of the town; the pagus Untinianus. From this name, would arise different versions of the including the Ontinient, Hontinient and Ontinyent.

The town of Ontinyent is also documented as having Muslim origins dating back to the 11th century. The poet al-Untinyaní was born there and it is known that the castle of Ontinyent (hisn Untinyân) was a stopover on the way from Murcia to Valencia. Although few structural remains have survived in the city, the windows of Pou Clar or the famous Covetes dels Moros (found in ravines between Ontinyent and Bocairent) show the importance of Islamic civilisation in the area. The caves were probably communal granaries that belonged to the peasant communities of the Andalusian period and had their origin in the tradition of the Berber people who settled in the area.

Ontinyent was conquered by the troops of Jaime I in the year 1244 and incorporated into the Kingdom of Valencia.

In the 18th century, the administration was castellanized throughout the Kingdom of Valencia and with it the name of the town changed its root "Onti-" to "Onte-". The Castilian form Onteniente became the official form until the end of the 20th century when the original Latin root of the name was reinstated.

In the provincial division of 1822 it was assigned to the province of Xátiva and in the division of 1833 to that of Alicante, passing definitively to the province of Valencia in 1836.

Ontinyent received the title of city in 1904.

== "Valencian Tuscany" - a land of vineyards ==
The area around Ontinyent is known for its many vineyards.

The Vall d'Albaida's climate has long made it an ideal spot for viticulture.

== City redevelopment ==
With the decline of the textile trade, Ontinyent has had to reinvent itself and has started an extensive process of redevelopment.

- The neighbourhood of Sant Antoni will see the creation of a new public square by shutting the left hand lane on the historic Carrer de Sant Antoni and ending access to the Plaça de la Coronació.
- The municipal market or mercat off of Plaça de la Coronació will see the opening of a new café featuring indoor and outdoor seating to tap into the growing gastronomic trend of the Valencian Community.
- The Plaça de la Glorieta will be remodelled to become an important green space in the city. The planting of 58 new trees will increase its tree coverage by 50%.
- The Museo Textil de la Communidad Valenciana has seen the redevelopment of a number of historic warehouses on the Clariano River.
- The Cantereria district will see the demolition of a row of houses and the construction of a floodable park on the banks of the Clariano River.
- La Muralla Norte, part of the ancient city walls, is being restored and improvements are being made to increase access to La Vila, the historic core of the city. 2.013.750€ from the Programa de Conservación del Patrimonio Histórico Español will be spent on the restoration of the wall and the reconstruction of the Abellons Tower, alongside stabilising the hillside near the Casa de Cultura and the Casa Barberá. The wall is said to have "two skins" - one Islamic and the other Christian. A second tower was discovered during renovations.
- The new Hospital de Ontinyent is set to open its doors early 2023 after investing almost 40 million euros in the construction of this much needed facility. The new hospital will house a pioneering brain injury unit and will be the main hospital for the municipalities of Albaida, Agullent, Aielo de Malferit, Fontanars dels Alforins, Atzeneta d'Albaida, Bèlgida, Benissoda, Bufali, Carricola, Palomar, Bocairent and Ontinyent. The current hospital will then be converted to focus on chronic care.

== Pou clar - natural spring ==
The natural spring just outside of the city is well known as a natural beauty spot and a favourite for bathers.

The Pou Clar is known as one of the Valencian Community's biggest natural attractions with its many pools, waterfalls, plant life and fish. In March 2022, it featured as the main backdrop in a Turia beer ad campaign.

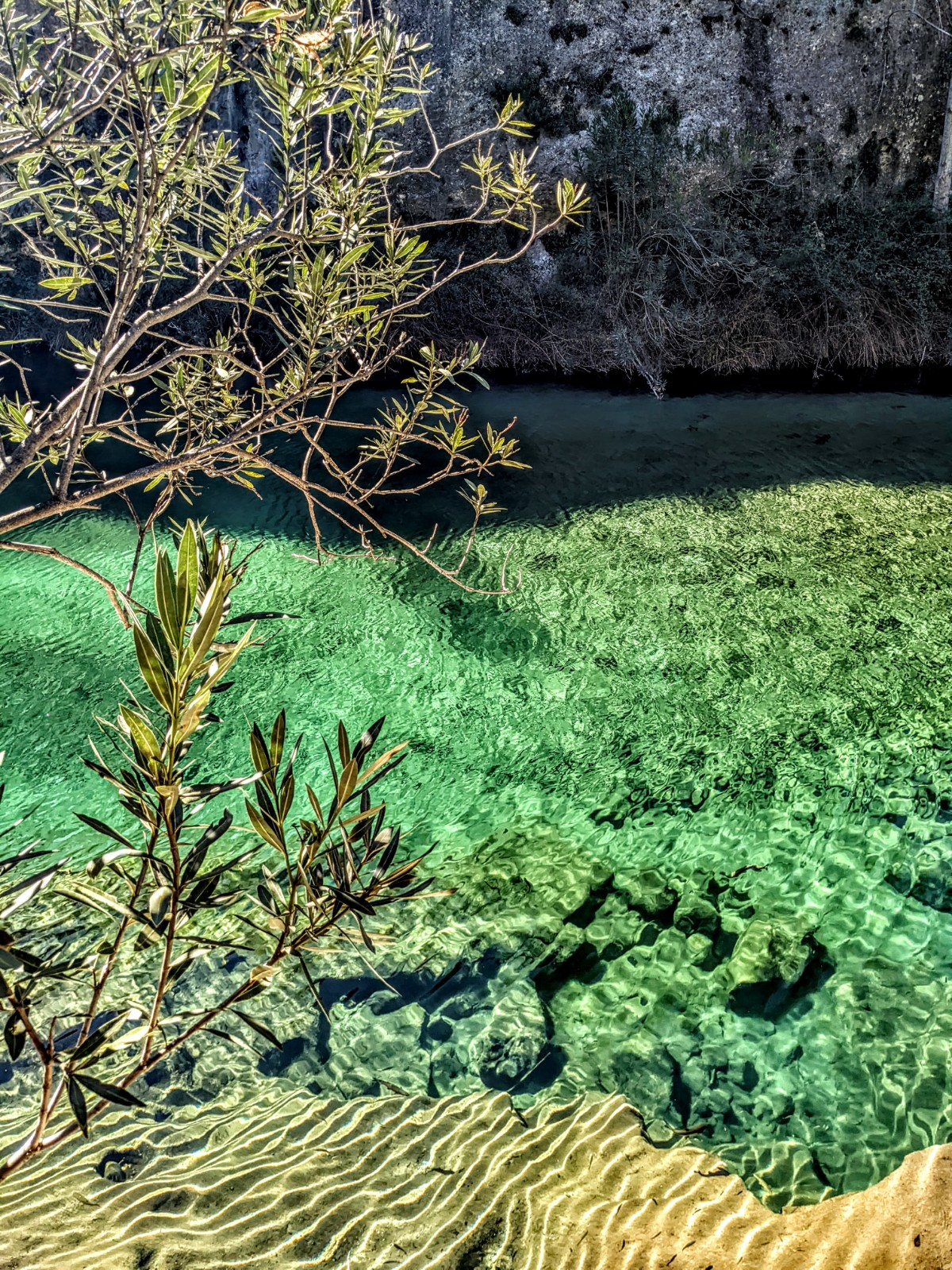
Natural spring outside of Ontinyent.

== Places to visit ==
- The Pont Vell, a 16th-century stone bridge crossing the Clariano River in the centre of the city. Recent excavations have revealed that a tower assumed to be defensive was actually an ancient mill.
- The Palau de la Vila, an old Andalusian fortress on the Clariano River, sits in La Vila, the medieval walled settlement.
- La Vila, the name for the ancient core of the city, is a maze of medieval housing, narrow lanes, small squares and colourful buildings. Ontinyent was one of the most populous towns in the 15th century and this can be seen in the wealth of historic buildings.
- Hotel Kazar, an impressive early 20th century Mudéjar palace in the centre of the city, is now a hotel. The house was built in 1925 for the Mompó family and is still known as Chalé Mompó.
- The vineyards to the west of the city.
- The Mirador San Rafael in the San Rafael neighbourhood is a "balcony" offering panoramic views of the city. It sits above the Clariano River and overlooks La Vila (the medieval core of the city), the Pont Vell and the Pont de Santa Maria.

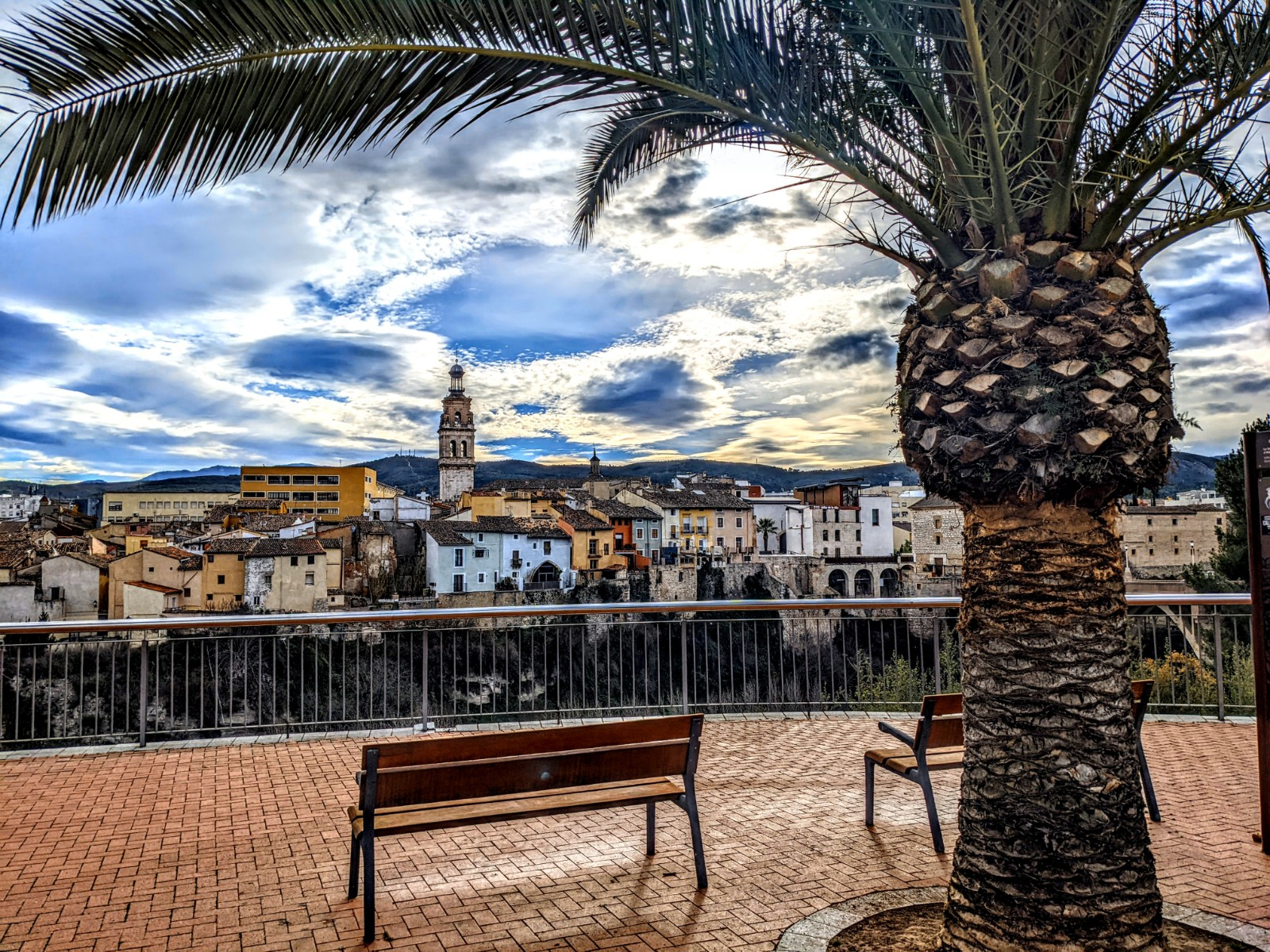
View across to the old core of the city.

== Moros i Cristians - festival ==
This festival has taken place every August since 1860 and commemorates the Christian reconquest of the city from Muslim troops in the 13th century by Jaime I. Battles are reenacted with cannon fire, opulent costumes and impressive decorations alongside theatrical parades. As an integral part a kind of anthem of the fiestas Moros i Cristians in Ontinyent, Chimo (Marxa mora, march of the Moors) was composed by José María Ferrero Pastor in 1964.

== Personalities ==
- José Melchor Gomis (1791–1836) composer, author of Himno de Riego
- Joaquín Llorens y Fernández de Córdoba (1854-1930), Carlist soldier and politician
- Manuel Simó Marín (1868-1936), Carlist and regionalist politician
- Juan Carlos Ferrero (b. 1980), former world no. 1 tennis player

== See also ==
- List of municipalities in Valencia
