= USS Chimo (ACM-1) =

United States Navy minelayer, 1944–1946

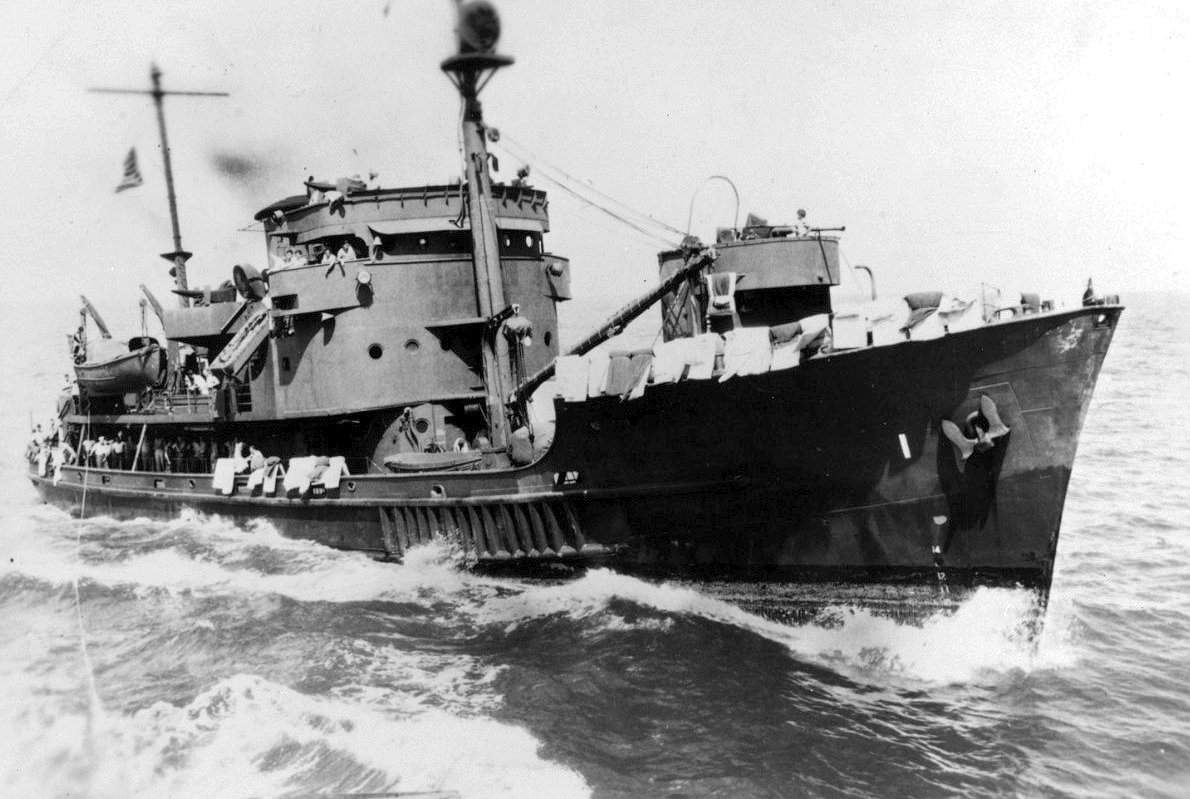
- Chimo en route to Saipan, September 1945

History

United States
- Name: USS Chimo (ACM-1)
- Builder: Marietta Manufacturing Company, Point Pleasant, West Virginia
- Laid down: 1943 as USAMP Colonel Charles W. Bundy for the U.S. Army
- Launched: 1943
- Acquired: 7 April 1944
- Commissioned: 7 April 1944
- Decommissioned: 21 May 1946
- Stricken: 19 July 1946
- Honours and awards: 2 battle stars
- Fate: Sold, 28 September 1948
- Notes: Converted to tuna seiner MV Day Island

General characteristics
- Class & type: Chimo-class minelayer
- Displacement: 880 long tons (894 t)
- Length: 188 ft 2 in (57.35 m)
- Beam: 37 ft (11 m)
- Draft: 12 ft 6 in (3.81 m)
- Propulsion: Two Combustion Engineering header type boilers, two 1,200shp Skinner Unaflow reciprocating engines, two shafts.
- Speed: 12.5 knots (23.2 km/h; 14.4 mph)
- Complement: 69
- Armament: 1 × 40 mm gun

The second USS Chimo (ACM-1) was the lead ship of her class of minelayers in the United States Navy during World War II.

Chimo was built as USAMP Colonel Charles W. Bundy for the U.S. Army Mine Planter Service by Marietta Manufacturing Co., Point Pleasant, West Virginia; converted at Norfolk Navy Yard; acquired by the U.S. Navy on 7 April 1944; commissioned the same day and reported to the Atlantic Fleet.

== Service history ==
=== Normandy invasion operations ===
Chimo sailed from Norfolk on 13 May 1944 for Plymouth and the Normandy beaches. She lay at anchor off Utah Beach from 7 to 19 June as flagship of Commander Minesweepers West, providing tender services to British and United States minesweeping forces as they kept lanes open for the movement of supplies vital to the invasion buildup. Between 20 June 1944 and 5 March 1945, Chimo operated from Plymouth along the coast of France at Cherbourg, bay of Saint-Brieuc, and Brest. She cleared Plymouth on 5 March for overhaul in the States and on 11 June, departed Norfolk arriving at San Diego on 3 July for voyage repairs and training.

=== Pacific Ocean operations ===
In mid-September 1945, Chimo began duty off Eniwetok, Saipan, and Okinawa until 1 February 1946, when she put into Sasebo. Chimo cleared Sasebo on 10 March for Saipan, Eniwetok, Pearl Harbor, and San Francisco, arriving 16 April.

=== Decommissioning ===
Chimo was decommissioned 21 May 1946, transferred to the War Shipping Administration and sold 28 September 1948. The ship was sold 1963 to become tuna seiner MV Day Island.

Chimo received two battle stars for World War II service.
