= Valencian Pilota Federation =

The Valencian Pilota Federation (Valencian: Federació de Pilota Valenciana) is the Valencian public organization that promotes and manages the many varieties and competitions of the Valencian pilota sport. Its current president is Vicent Molines.

The Federació de Pilota Valenciana was founded in 1984. Until then, Valencian pilota had been governed by the Confederación Española de Pelota, an institution focused on Basque pelota, a different form of handball. Its lack of concern for the Valencian sport was evident in the fact that the presidents of the Valencian federation were appointed from Madrid and were unfamiliar with the discipline, or were simply former Basque-pelota players.

This continued until a former professional Valencian pilotari, Enrique Menéndez, became president. He soon resigned, however, in protest against what he described as the “ignorance” shown toward the local sport. His resignation led to the creation of an independent Valencian pilota federation.

The FPV has designated June 14 as “Pilota Day,” commemorating the date in 1391 when the playing of pilota was banned in the streets of València.

== Official competitions ==
Professionals

- Escala i corda
  - Trofeu Individual Bancaixa
  - Circuit Bancaixa
- Raspall
  - Raspall singles championship
  - Raspall team championship

== International relationships ==
Since 1992, the FPV is a member of the International Ball game Confederation, which organizes every year the Handball International Championships.
