= Francisco Luis Brines Ferrer =

Spanish Valencian pilota player

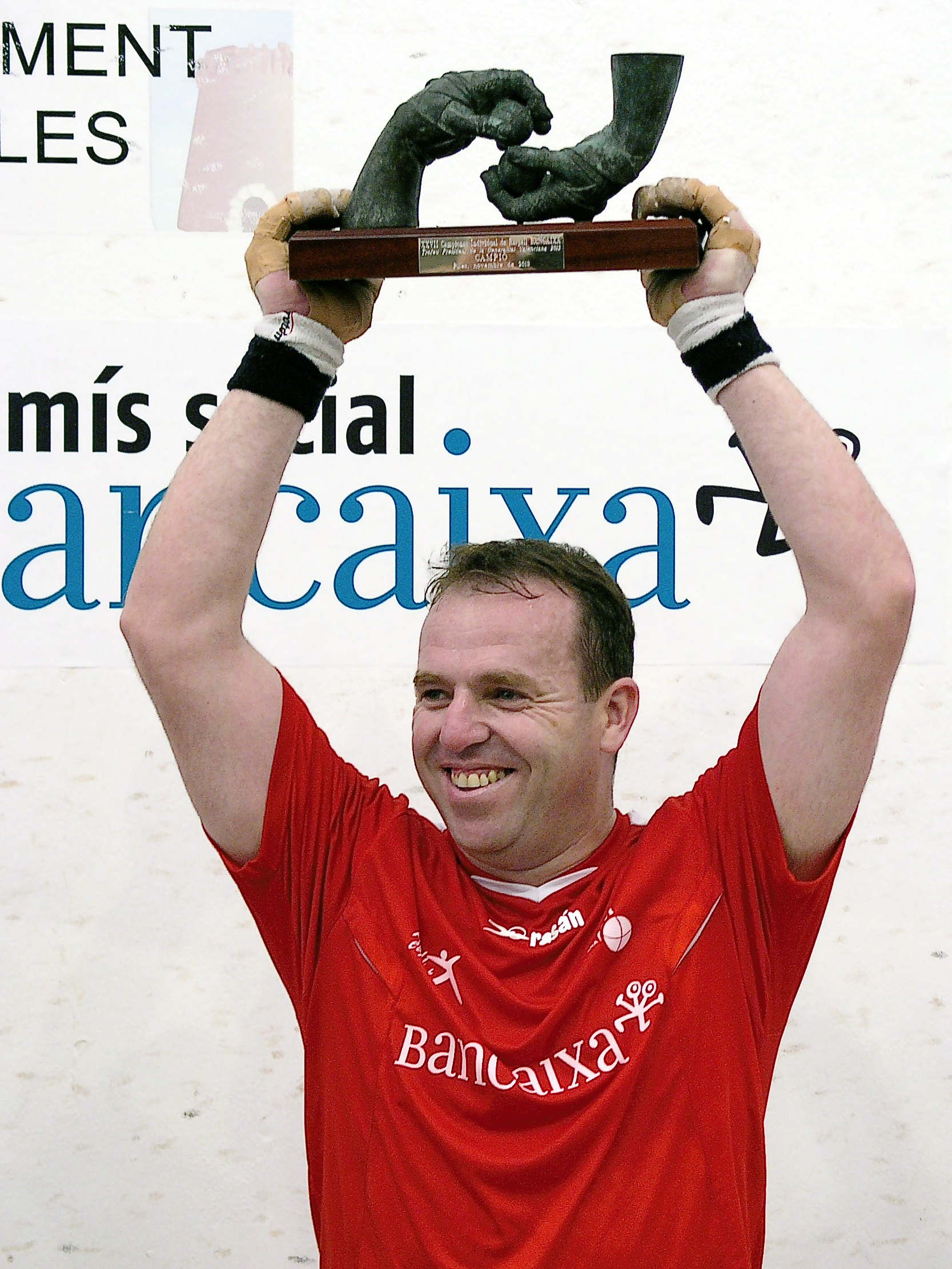
Francisco Luis Brines Ferrer

Francisco Luis Brines Ferrer (Simat de la Valldigna), a.k.a. Coeter II, is a Valencian pilota player, mitger in the category of raspall. He is brother of the former champion, Miquel, Coeter I.

In the local Spanish elections of 2007 he was a candidate of the Bloc Nacionalista Valencià in his village, but he was not elected.

== List of achievements ==
- Champion of the Campionat Individual de Raspall: 2006.
  - Runner-up of the Campionat Individual de Raspall: 2008 and 2009.
- Champion of the Campionat per Equips de Raspall: 2010.
  - Runner-up of the Campionat per equips de Raspall: 2001 and 2008.
- Champion of the Trofeu Gregori Maians of Oliva: 2009.
- Champion of the Trofeu Mancomunitat de municipis de la Safor: 2006, 2008 and 2009.
  - Runner-up of the Trofeu Mancomunitat de municipis de la Safor: 2010.
