= Raspall singles championship =

The Campionat Individual de Raspall (Valencian for Raspall Singles Championship) is the Valencian pilota Raspall modality singles league played by professional pilotaris.

== Statistics ==
Year	Winner	Runner-up	Score	City
2007				
2006	Coeter II	Agustí	25-5	Bellreguard
2005	Waldo			La Llosa de Ranes
2004	Waldo	Juan	25-10	Oliva
2003	Not played			
2002	Waldo			Oliva
2001	Gorxa			Daimús
2000	Waldo	Moro		Oliva
1999	Gorxa	Waldo		Daimús
1998	Carlos	Gorxa		Oliva
1997	Gorxa	Juan Gràcia		Daimús
1996	Carlos	Armando		Oliva
1995	Juan	Carlos		El Genovés
1994	Juan	Pasqual II		El Genovés
1993	Pasqual II	Loripet		El Genovés
1992	Pasqual II	Juan		El Genovés
1991	Pasqual II	Diego		El Genovés
1990	Pasqual II	Coeter		El Genovés
1989	Coeter	Loripet		Simat de la Valldigna
1988	Diego	Loripet		Oliva
1987	Pepito	Sevi		Oliva
1986	Pepito	Malonda II		Oliva

== Campionat Individual de Raspall relevant facts ==
- 2003: The competition was not played.
- 2006: Coeter II is the first mitger who wins a competition that looked to be only for dauers (despite the runners-up Agustí, and Moro the year 2000).

== See also ==
- Valencian pilota
- Raspall
- Raspall team championship
