= Valencian Gothic =

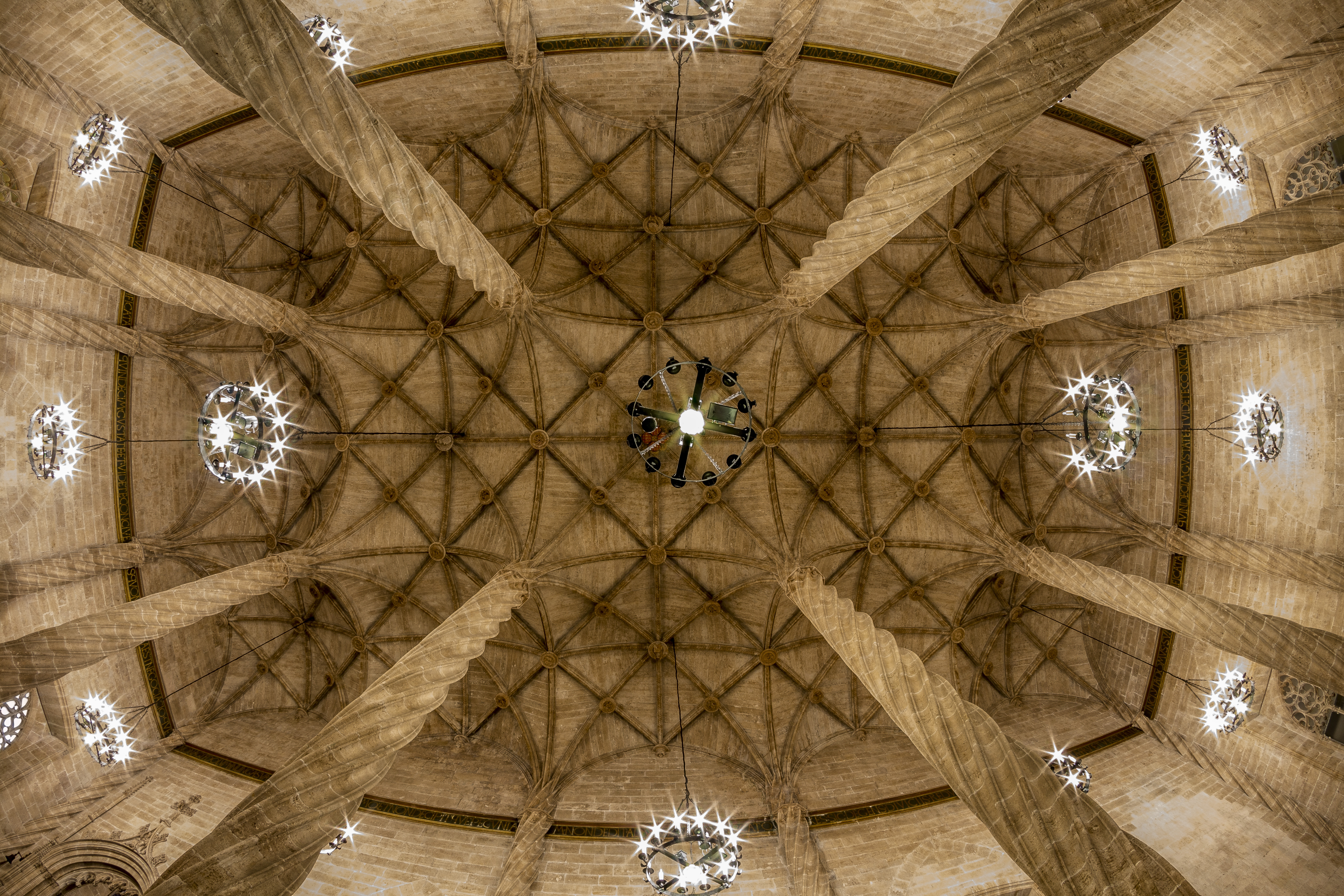
Llotja de la Seda, Valencia.

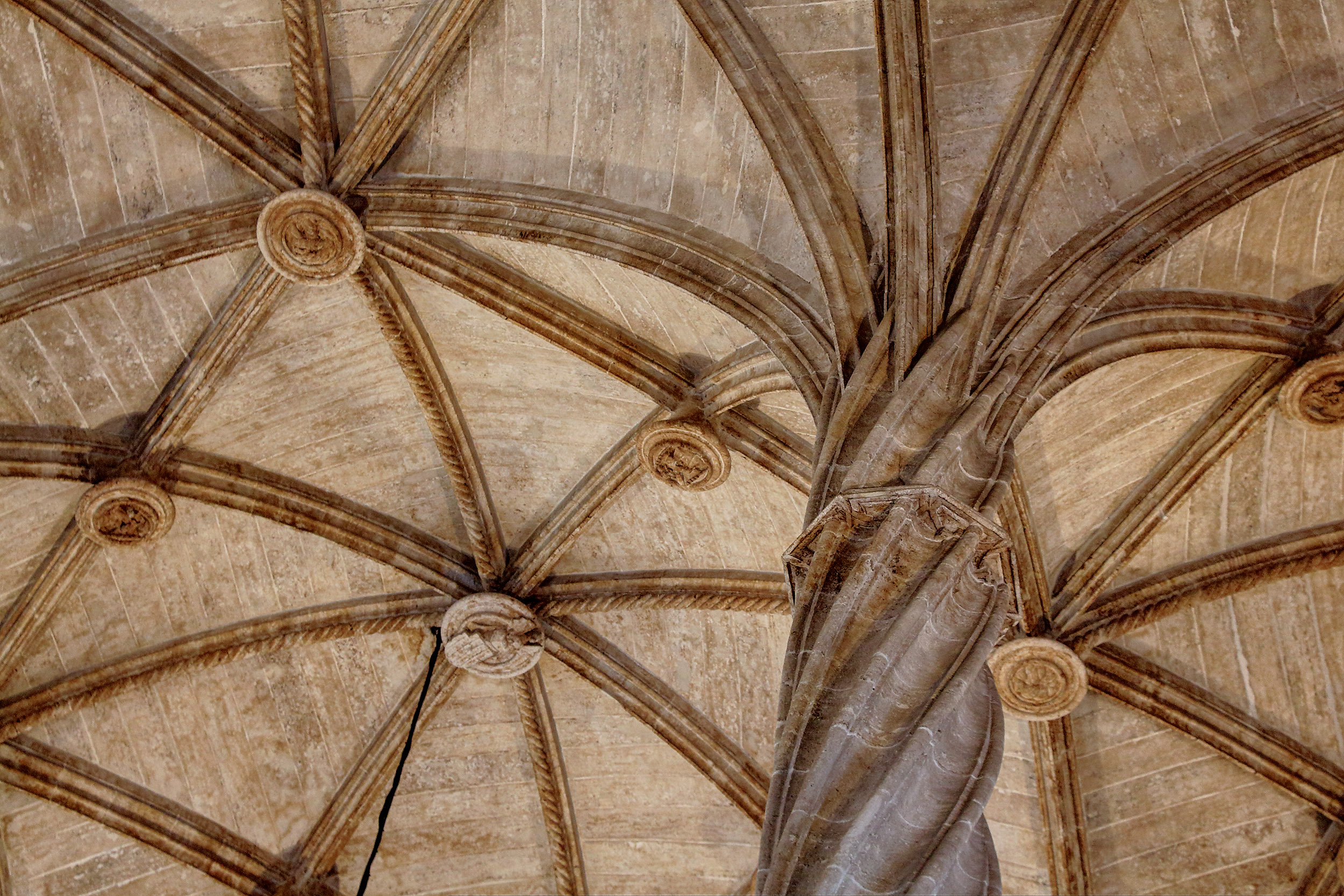
Detail of the Llotja de la Seda, Valencia.

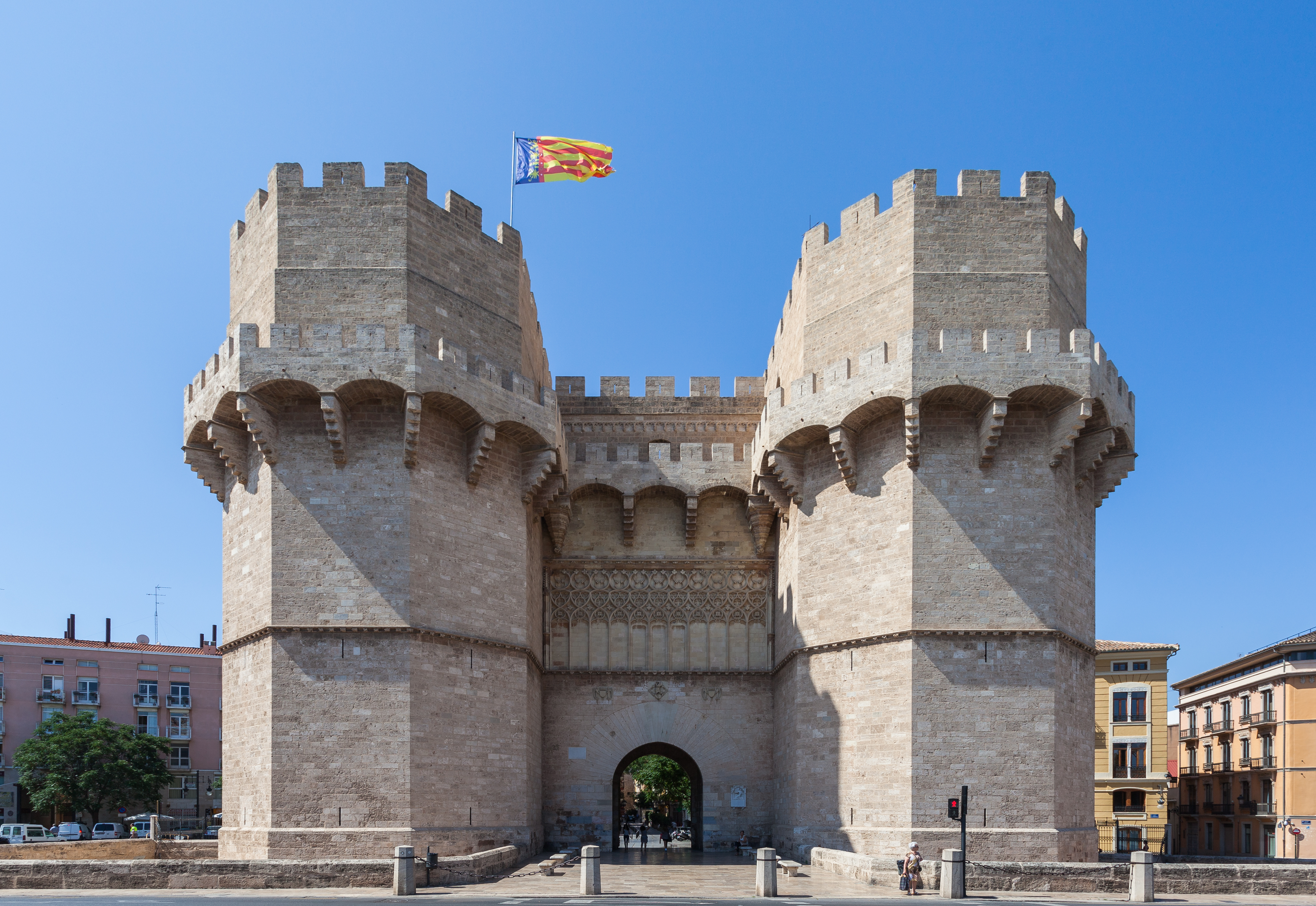
Torres de Serranos, in Valencia

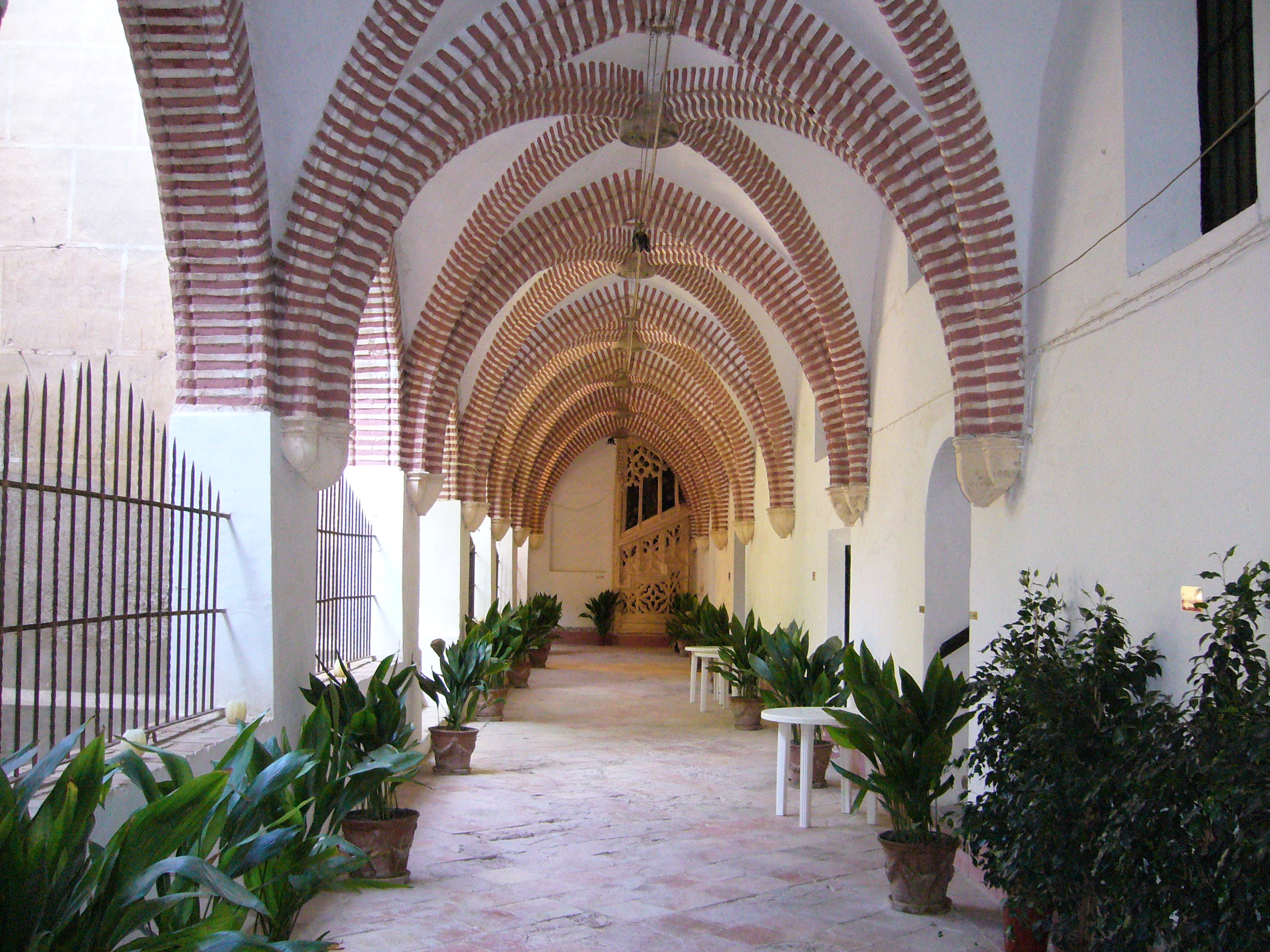
Cloister of the Monastery of Sant Jeroni de Cotalba, in Alfauir (Valencia).

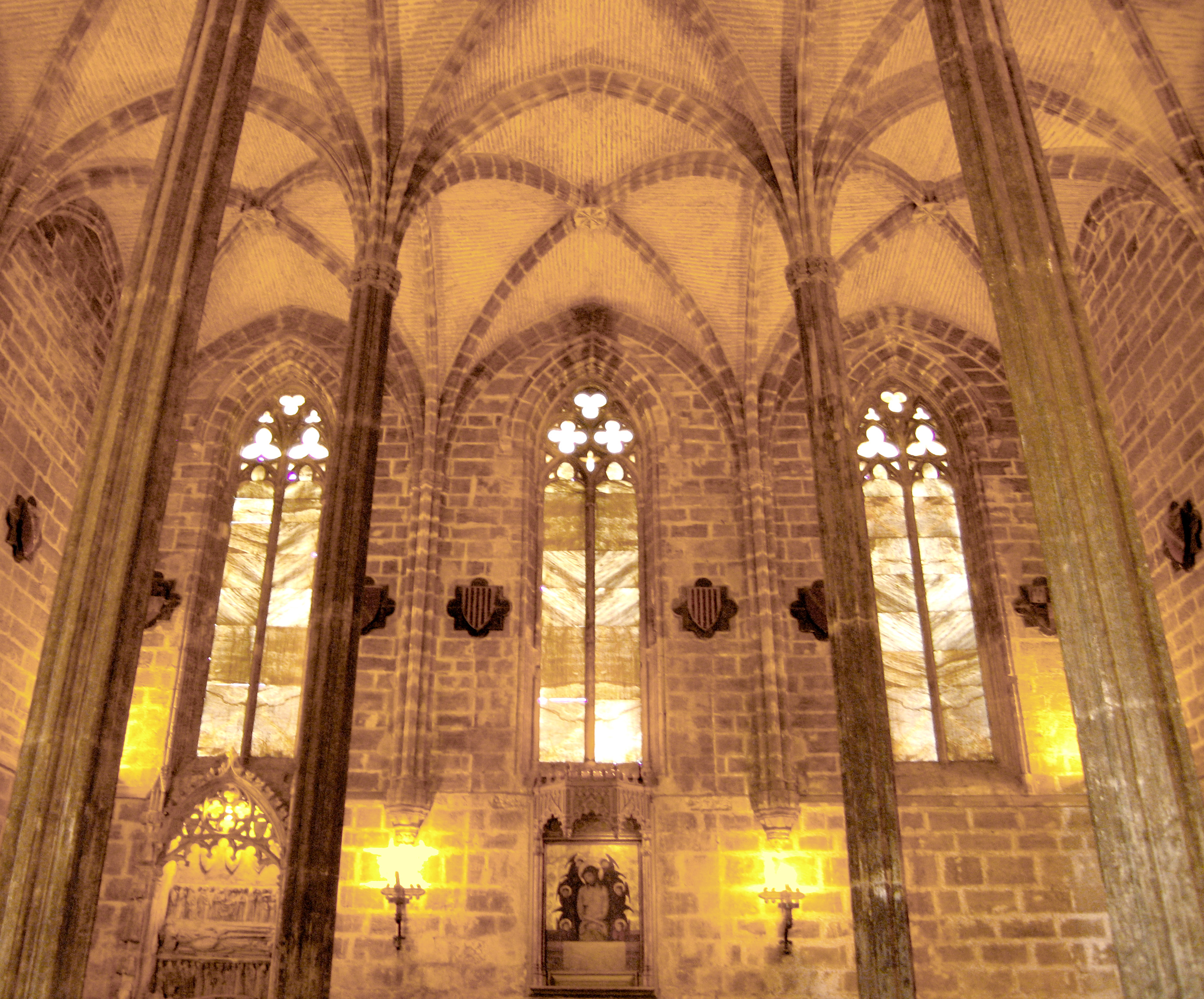
Convento de Santo Domingo, in Valencia.

Valencian Gothic (Valencian: Gòtic valencià; Spanish: Gótico valenciano) is an architectural style. It occurred under the Kingdom of Valencia between the 13th and 15th centuries, which places it at the end of the European Gothic period and at the beginning of the Renaissance. The term "Valencian Gothic" is confined to the Kingdom of Valencia and its area of influence, which has its own characteristics.

== Characteristics ==
The common characteristics of the Valencian Gothic are the following:

- Development of the architecture by techniques already used in Roman architecture and of the Mediterranean countries. On these lines, the Kingdom of Valencia was influenced by arriving from France.
- Clear predominance of the architecture of the cultures of the Mediterranean countries respect of the influence of the French Gothic.
- The architectural proportions do not change with the arrival of the Renaissance.
- Divergence with the classic Gothic style.
- Clear influence of Flamboyant Gothic, which confers uniqueness.
- Cladding and concealment during the 17th to 19th centuries of the Valencian Gothic by newer styles such as the Baroque or the Neoclassical, so today much of the Valencian Gothic remains hidden.
- Little impact of Mudéjar architecture, but in spite of this, there are interesting examples of Mudéjar architecture in the Valencian Community, that given the occasional use, are of great singularity.

== Architecture ==
The most important valencian architects of the Valencian Gothic style are: Pere Compte, Francesc Baldomar, Pere Balaguer, Andreu Julià, etc.

=== Religious building examples ===
Province of Alicante

- In Alicante, Basilica of Santa Maria, Concatedral de San Nicolás.
- In Castalla, Ermita de la Sangre.
- In Orihuela, Orihuela Cathedral.
- In Teulada, Iglesia de Santa Catalina.
- In Villena, Iglesia Arciprestal de Santiago, Iglesia de Santa María.
- In Xàbia, Iglesia de San Bartolomé.

Province of Castellón

- In L'Alcora, Iglesia de Nuestra Señora de la Asunción.
- In Borriana, Basílica de El Salvador.
- In Castellfort, Ermita de San Pedro.
- In Castellón, Castelló Cathedral, El Fadrí.
- In Jérica, Ermita de San Roque.
- In Morella, Iglesia de Santa María.
- In Sant Mateu, Iglesia arciprestal de San Mateo
- In Segorbe, Segorbe Cathedral.
- In Vallibona, Iglesia de la Asunción de la Virgen.

Province of Valencia

- In Ademuz, Ermita de Nuestra Señora de la Huerta.
- In Alfauir, Monastery of Sant Jeroni de Cotalba.
- In Carcaixent, Ermita de San Roque de Ternils.
- In Castielfabib, Ermita de Nuestra Señora de Gracia.
- In Gandia, Collegiate Basilica of Gandia, Convent of Santa Clara of Gandia.
- In Llutxent, Monastery of the Corpus Christi.
- In Serra, Cartuja de Porta Coeli.
- In Simat de la Valldigna, Monastery of Santa María de la Valldigna.
- In Valencia, Valencia Cathedral, El Miguelete, Iglesia de San Juan del Hospital, Iglesia de San Martín, Antiguo Convento del Carmen, Convento de Santo Domingo, Iglesia de Santa Catalina, Monasterio de la Trinidad, Church of San Nicolás, Iglesia de San Agustín, etc.
- In Xàtiva, Iglesia de San Francisco, Hermitage of Santa Ana, etc.

=== Civil buildings ===
The most important buildings of the Valencian civil Gothic style are:

Province of Alicante

- In Cocentaina, Palace of the Counts of Cocentaina.
- In Alcoy, palace of the Archaeological Museum Camil Visedo.

Province of Castellón

- In Cinctorres, Palacio de los San Juan.
- In Vilafamés, palacio del Museo de Vilafamés.

Province of Valencia

- In Gandia, Ducal Palace of Gandia, Archaeological Museum of Gandia.
- In Valencia, Llotja de la Seda, Palace of the Borgias, Torres de Serranos, Torres de Quart, Almudín de Valencia, Atarazanas del Grao, Casa del Almirante, Palacio de Joan de Valeriola, Palacio de los Escrivà, etc.
- In Xàtiva, Almodí de Xativa.

=== Blending Valencian Gothic with Mudéjar ===
Province of Castellón

- In Jérica, Torre mudéjar de la Alcudia.
- In Onda, Iglesia de la Sangre.
- In Segorbe, artesonado del Salón de Sesiones del antiguo Palacio Ducal (actualmente sede del Ayuntamiento de Segorbe).

Province of Valencia

- In Alfauir, the cloister of the Monastery of Sant Jeroni de Cotalba.
- In Godella, la capilla del Cristo de la Paz en la Iglesia de San Bartolomé Apóstol.
- In Llíria, la iglesia de la Sangre de Liria.
- In Sagunto, la iglesia vieja de Sagunto.
- In Torres Torres, baños árabes.
- In Valencia, Baños del Almirante.

== Bibliography ==
- Arturo Zaragozá Catalán. Valencian Gothic Architecture. Valencia, Generalitat Valenciana, 2000, ISBN 978-84-482-2545-2
- Arturo Zaragozá Catalán. Memorias Olvidadas. Imágenes de la escultura gótica valenciana. Valencia, Generalitat Valenciana, 2015, ISBN 978-84-482-6017-0
- Mariano Torreño Calatayud. Arquitectura gótica valenciana. Valencia. Carena Editors, 2010. ISBN 978-84-96419-96-4

== See also ==
- Route of the Monasteries of Valencia
- Route of the Borgias
- Route of the Valencian classics
- Valencian Art Nouveau
