= Torres de Quart =

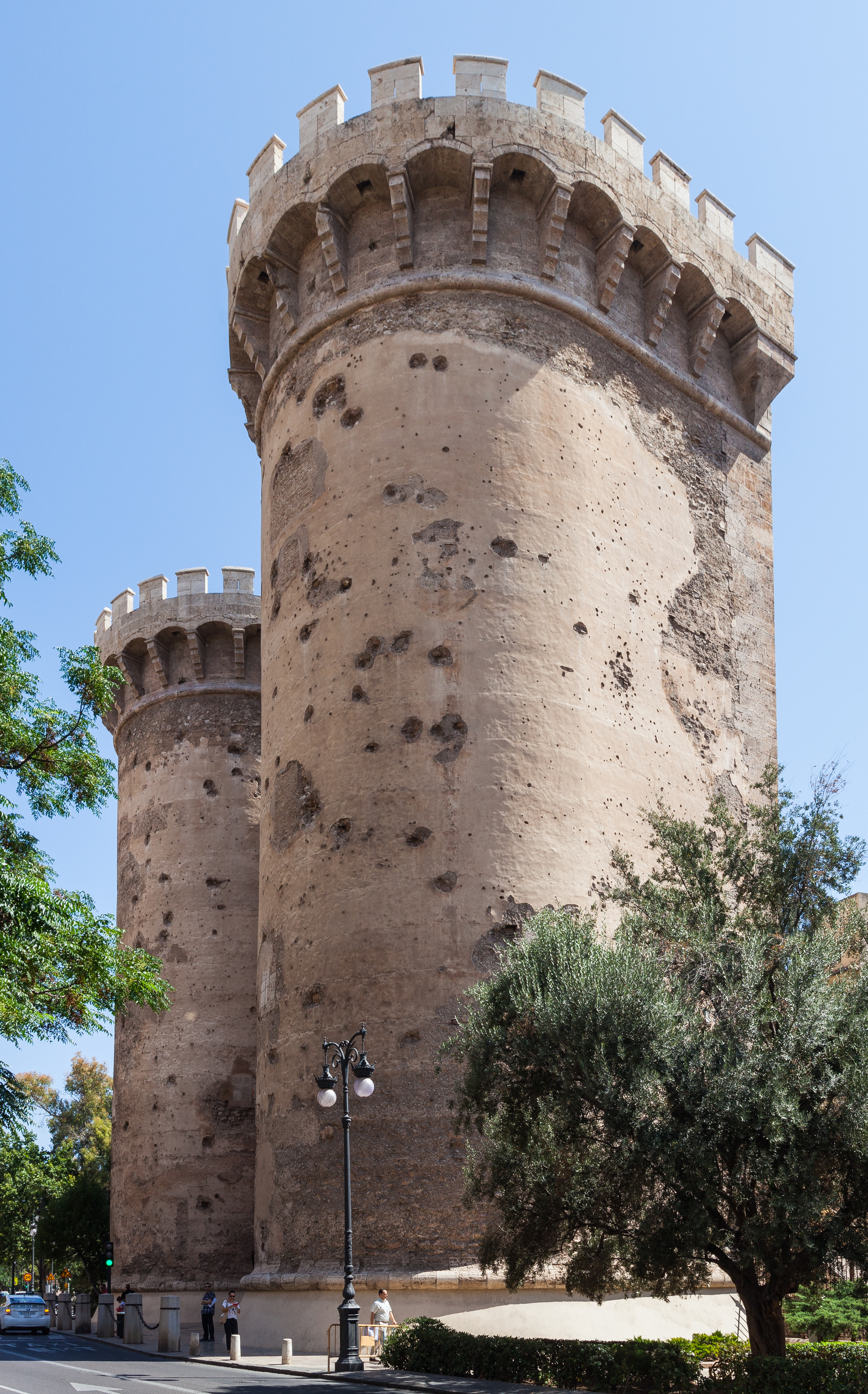
- From the southwest
- Interactive map of the Torres de Quart area
- Alternative names: Puerta de Quart, Torres de Cuarte

General information
- Type: fortified gate
- Architectural style: Valencian Gothic
- Location: El Carmen, València, Spain
- Coordinates: 39.475760°N 0.383958°W
- Construction started: 1441
- Completed: 1493
- Governing body: Valencia City Council

Height
- Height: 34 metres

Design and construction
- Architects: Francesc Baldomar, Jaime Pérez, Pere Compte, and Pere Bonfill

The Torres de Quart or Puerta de Quart (also called de Cuarte) is one of the two remaining gates of the old Valencia city wall. It was built between 1441 and 1493. It was still in use during the Peninsular War when it was marked by cannonballs and musket shots.

== History ==
The Torres de Quart was originally one of the gates in the wall ordered built by Abd al-Aziz ibn Abi Amir (1021–1061) and called Alcántara. It is thought that the Islamic gate was a cubic tower open on one side. In the wall built by the Christian rulers, the gate is so named because the road to Quart de Poblet departed from this gate. The old gate was probably a small tower with a doorway, so something much more substantial was needed as the movement of trade from the port through to the western kingdoms was of growing significance.

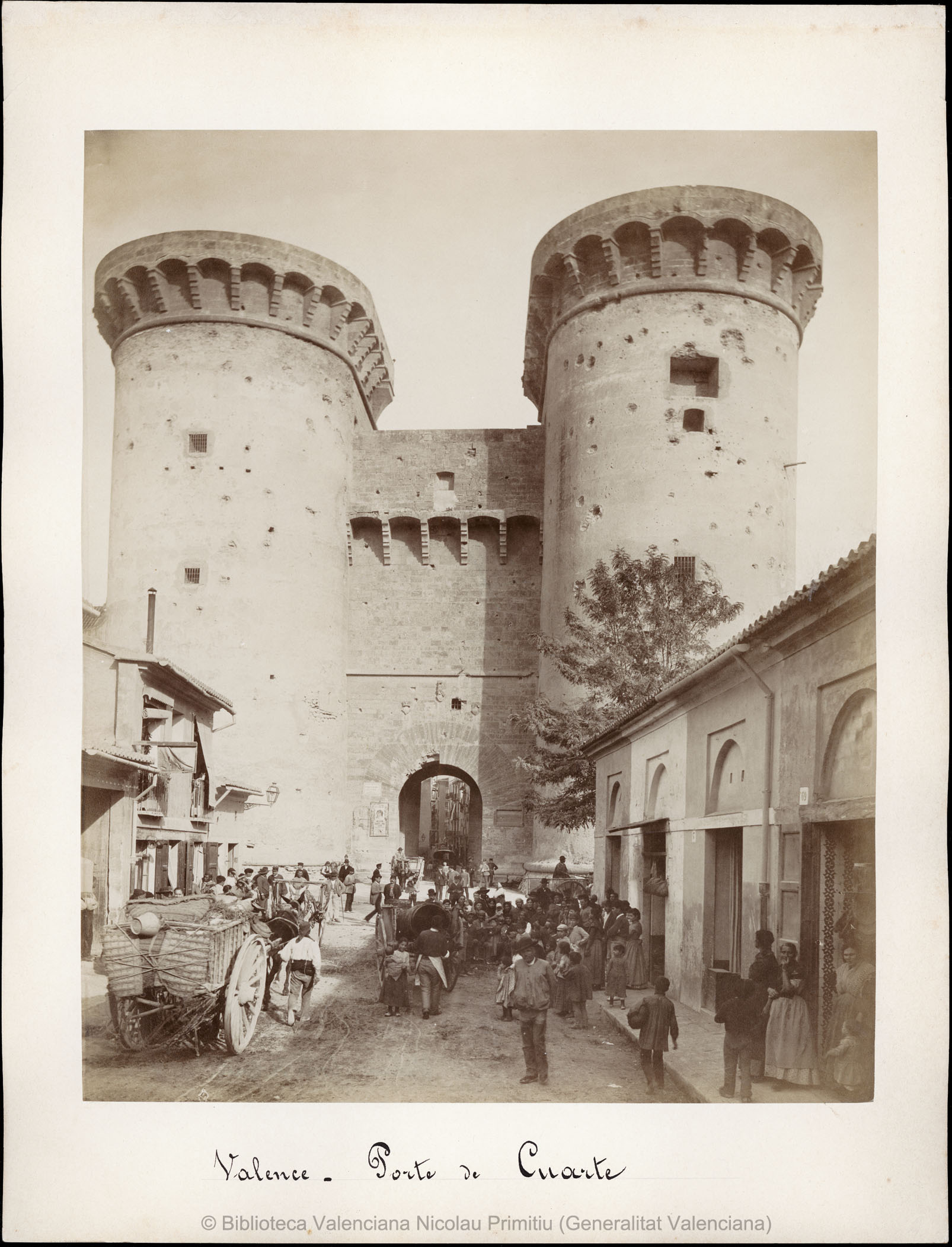
View from the west toward the outside of the Torres de Quart

During the 14th century, Peter the Cruel of Castile was regularly at war with Islamic forces, the population had increased outside the original Islamic walls, and flooding of the Turia River was a growing concern. This resulted in projects to replace the Islamic walls and rebuild the gates ordered by Peter IV of Aragon. As this project progressed, in 1440 the city government began work to replace the primitive gate and build a gate more in the style of the Torres de Serranos (1392-1398). The Quart gate was considered one of the four important gates of the city together with Serranos, El Mar, and San Vicente. Quart was the western gate toward the kingdom of Castile, Serranos was the northern gate to Aragon and Catalonia, El Mar was the eastern gate to the port and the sea, and San Vicente was the southern gate to Xátiva and the southern kingdom. While Quart is one of the principal gates of the city, it is not of primary importance as Torres de Serranos. Serranos was completed in three years, whereas Quart took twenty years to complete.

The new tower was built by Francesc Baldomar (1444-1460), Jaime Pérez (1460-1468), Pere Compte (1468-1469), and Pere Bonfill (1469-1493). The gate was built with lime mortar and cobblestones with ashlar masonry in the arches, vaults, and stairs. The foundation was completed between 1441 and 1443 by master stonemason Jaime Gallén and his son Andrés de Montoro. In 1444 the tower walls were begun with the stone facade and vaulting in 1445–1446. At this point there was a slowing of work due to the city market burning in 1447 and then a plague outbreak in 1450. Work resumed and in 1451 Baldomar completed the vaulting of the first floor and began work on the machicolation from the second floor. In 1460, Baldomar was replaced by his stonemason, Jaime Pérez, however work slowed as attention was focused on the Puerta Nuevo. Work was taken up by Pere Bonfill in 1469 with paving and finishes. He directed the construction of the spiral staircases in 1476. Pere Bonfill took over the project in 1469 and completed it with the installation of new doors in 1493.

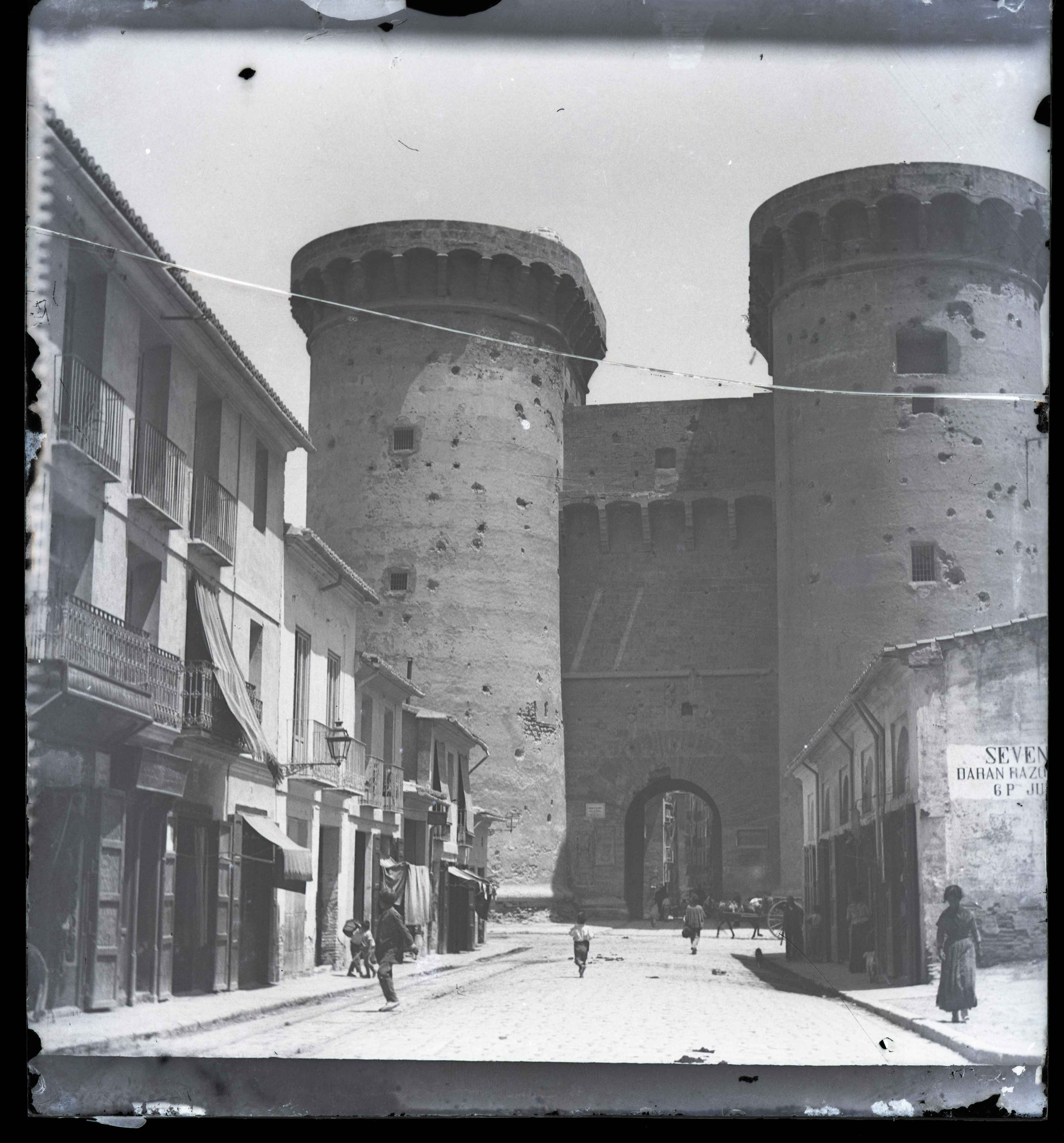
An early 20th century photograph from the west

Over the subsequent centuries, the city of València was not placed under siege. While the walls of the city were in disrepair, the towers continued to be anchor points in the defense of the city. In the 17th century, the tower was also being used as a women's prison, with many inmates being prostitutes.

On June 28, 1808, during the Battle of Valencia in the Peninsular War, cannonballs and bullets from French troops damaged the gate. The holes were preserved during future restorations as a memory of the occasion. In 1813, the structure became a military prison. Valencia's ancient city wall was torn down in 1865, but Torres de Quart, along with another gate, the Torres de Serranos, survived thanks to their functions as prisons. Additional cannon damage occurred in 1873 during the Cantonal rebellion.

The gate was declared a national monument in 1931. It has undergone several restorations; most recently in 2007 and now serves as a tourist attraction.

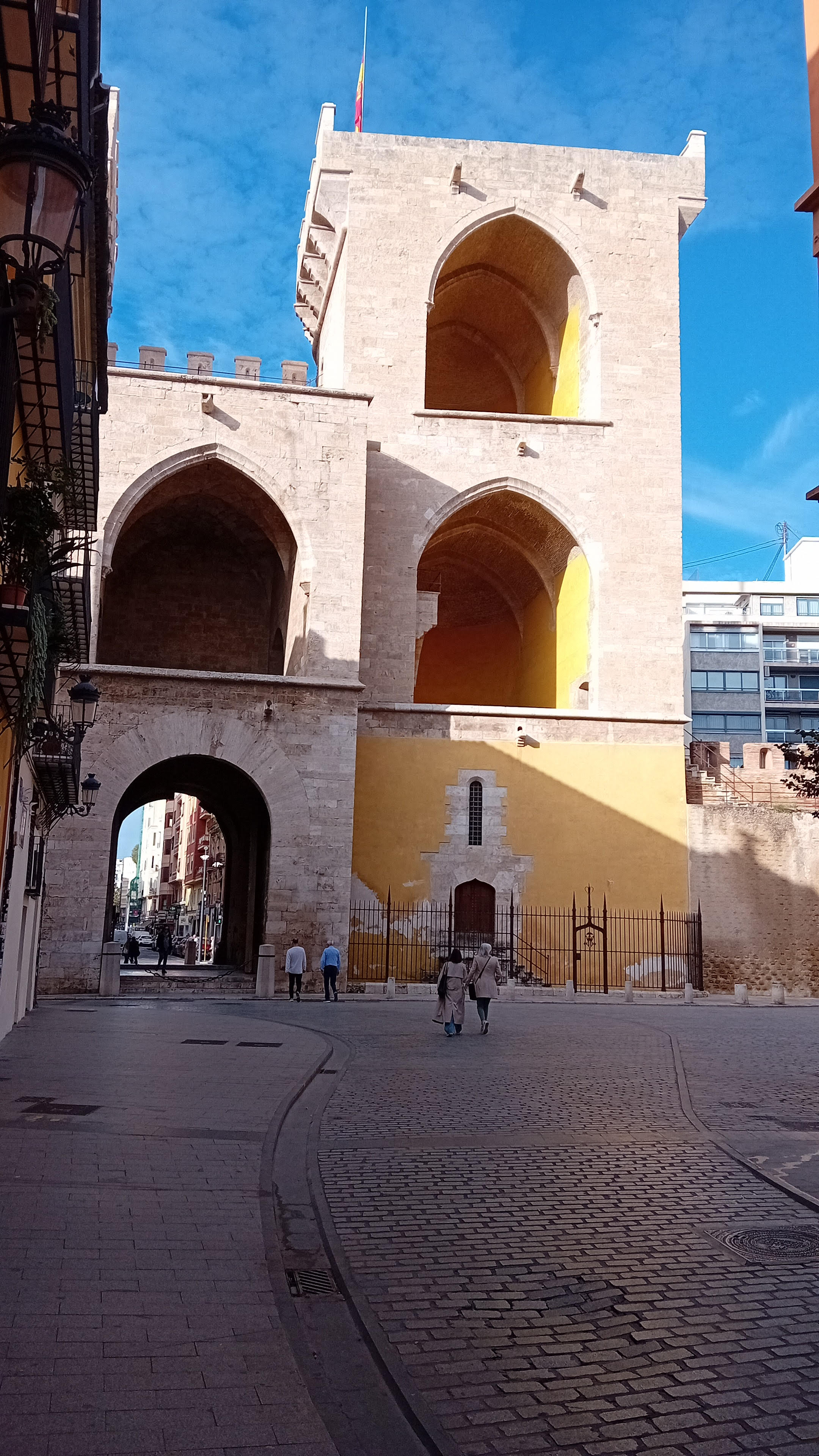
View from the east, the town side. The open back was to prevent the tower being used against the city's population
