= Basilica of Santa Maria, Alicante =

Spanish church

Coordinates: 38°20′46.2″N 0°28′45.5″W

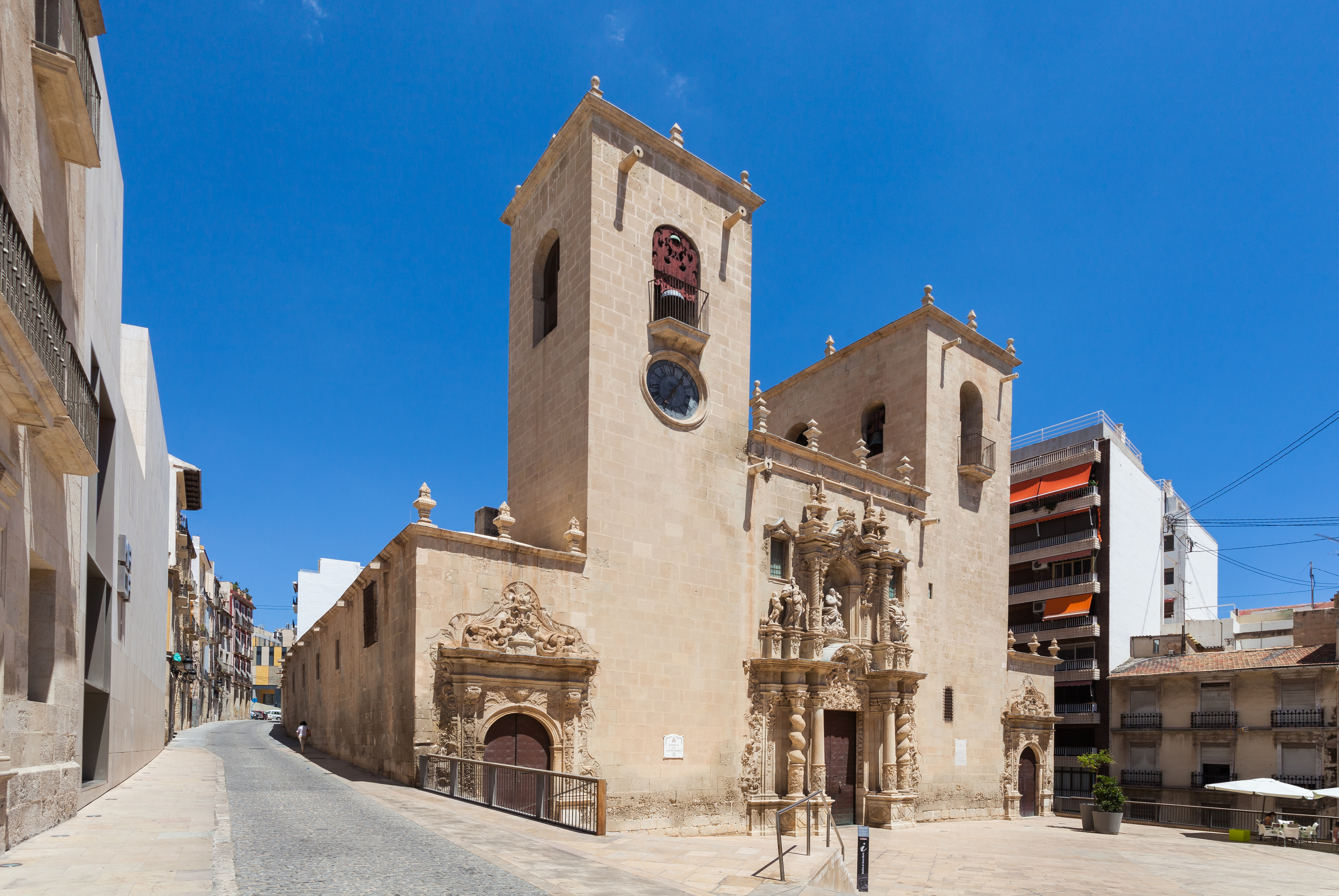
Basilica of St Mary.

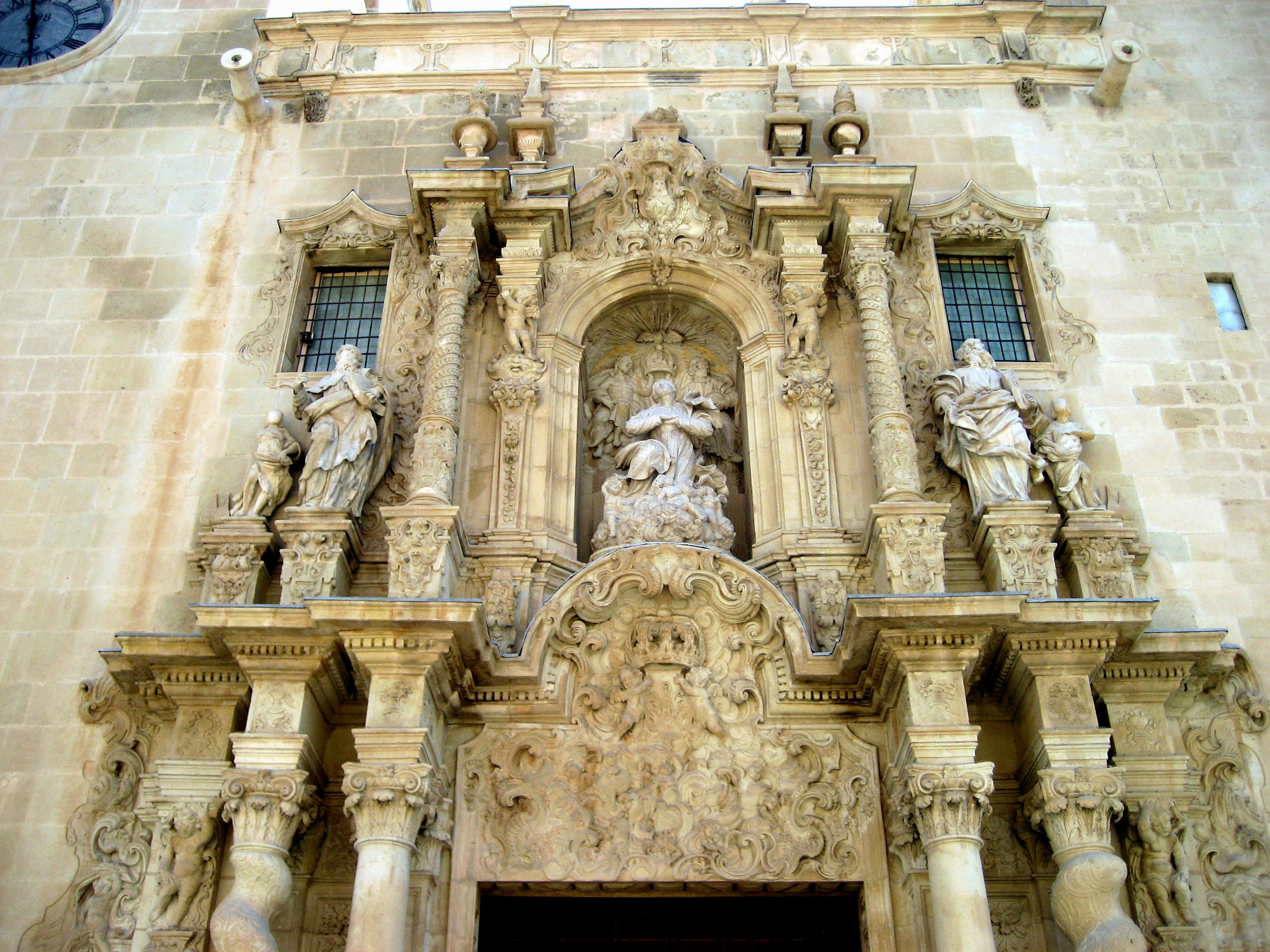
Baroque style facade of the basilica.

The Basilica of Santa Maria is the oldest active church in Alicante, Spain. It was built in Valencian Gothic style between the 14th and 16th centuries over the remains of a mosque.

The basilica is composed from a single nave with six side chapels located between the buttresses. In 2007, by request of the city of Alicante to the Holy See, the church was promoted to the rank of basilica.
