= Terenci Miñana i Andrés =

Terenci Miñana i Andrés, el Xiquet de Simat (the boy from Simat) (Simat de la Valldigna, 1884–1954) was a Valencian pilota player during the first decades of the 20th century.

He was a pupil of Nel de Murla, who discovered him in 1902 during a match, and presented him in the Pelayo trinquet of Valencia. Both, Nel as escalater and the Xiquet as mitger, were the best couple of the Valencian pilota at the beginning of the 20th century, since they were outstanding in any category of Valencian pilota. They were also the ones who began to play the Escala i corda.

He retired in 1918, in good condition. He came back some years later, but then he played as punter or as feridor. In 1928 he became the manager of the Pelayo trinquet.

== Private life ==
At the end of 1926 and 1927 Terenci Miñana was involved in a cocaine traffic matter, and he was related with Leopoldo Risueño, the master of gambling in Valencia.

When the Spanish Civil War finished, Terenci Miñana paid for the construction of a pantheon for a friend of his who was killed by the Committees for the defense of the Spanish Republic.
