= Archaeological Museum Camil Visedo =

- Museu Arqueològic Camil Visedo Moltó
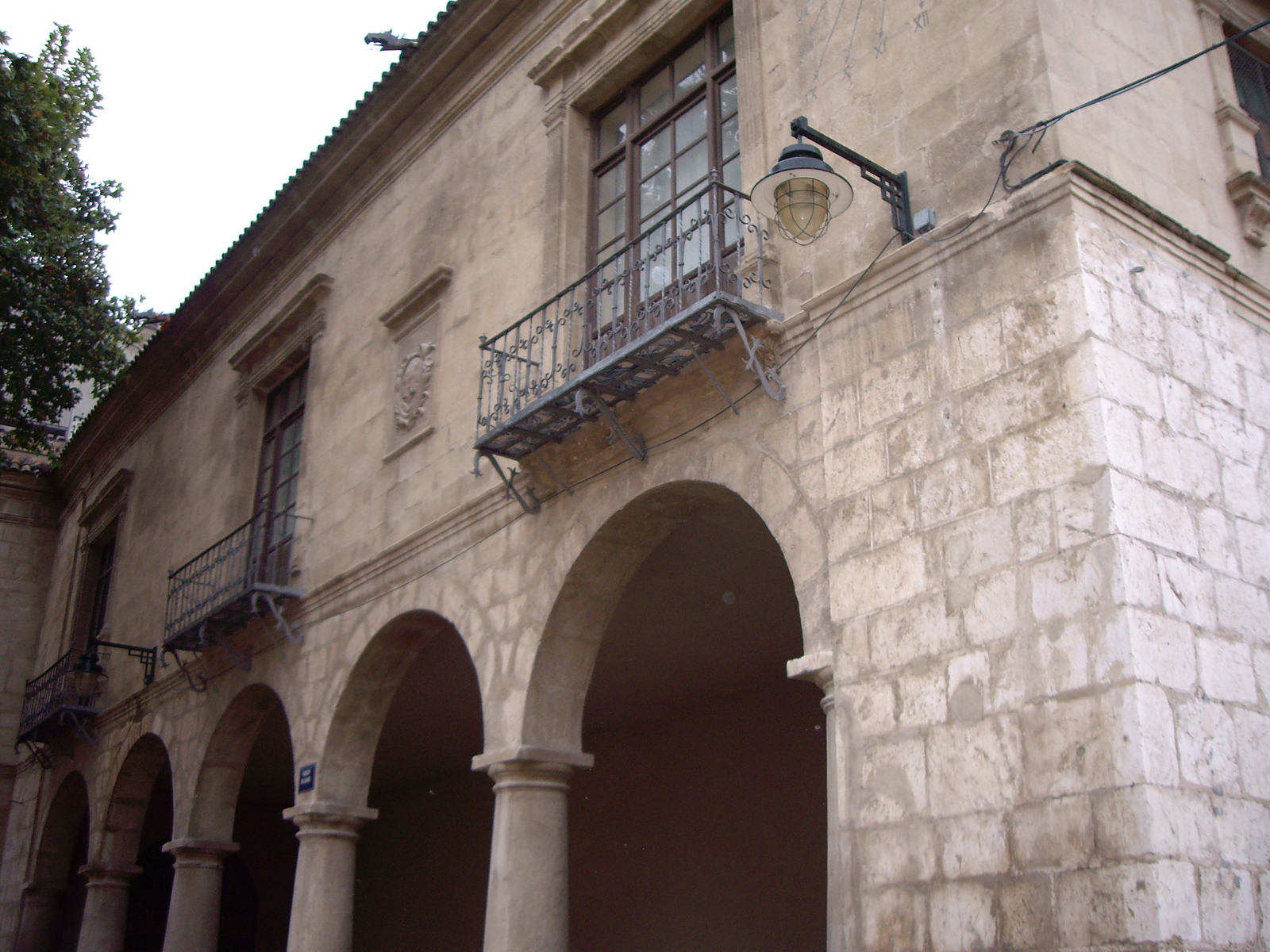
- Established: 1945
- Location: Placeta del Carbó, s/n - Alcoy (Alicante), Spain
- Coordinates: 38°41′00″N 0°21′00″W
- Type: Archaeological
- Website: Website of the Archaeological Museum Camil Visedo

The Archaeological Museum Camil Visedo of Alcoy (Alicante), in Spain, is located in a building of Valencian Gothic and Renaissance styles that was the town hall between the 16th and 19th centuries and which later hosted different uses, such as schools, until it is enabled to Museum.

The building has a plant in the form of "L" as a result of the union of two buildings at right angles. The oldest part of Gothic style has a solid facade with stone ashlars in which a cover opens with semicircular arch. The most elongated part corresponds to the Renaissance building and has a gallery of five classical arches, at the bottom, with columns of the Tuscan order.

Outdoor opposed the facade of medieval and Renaissance form a wedge with the noble floor overlapping, with three baroque balconies and the coat of arms of Alcoy. The stairway that leads to the upper rooms is located in the union of both buildings.
