= Torres de Serranos =

14th century gate and monument in Valencia, Spain

Coordinates: 39.479293°N 0.375933°W

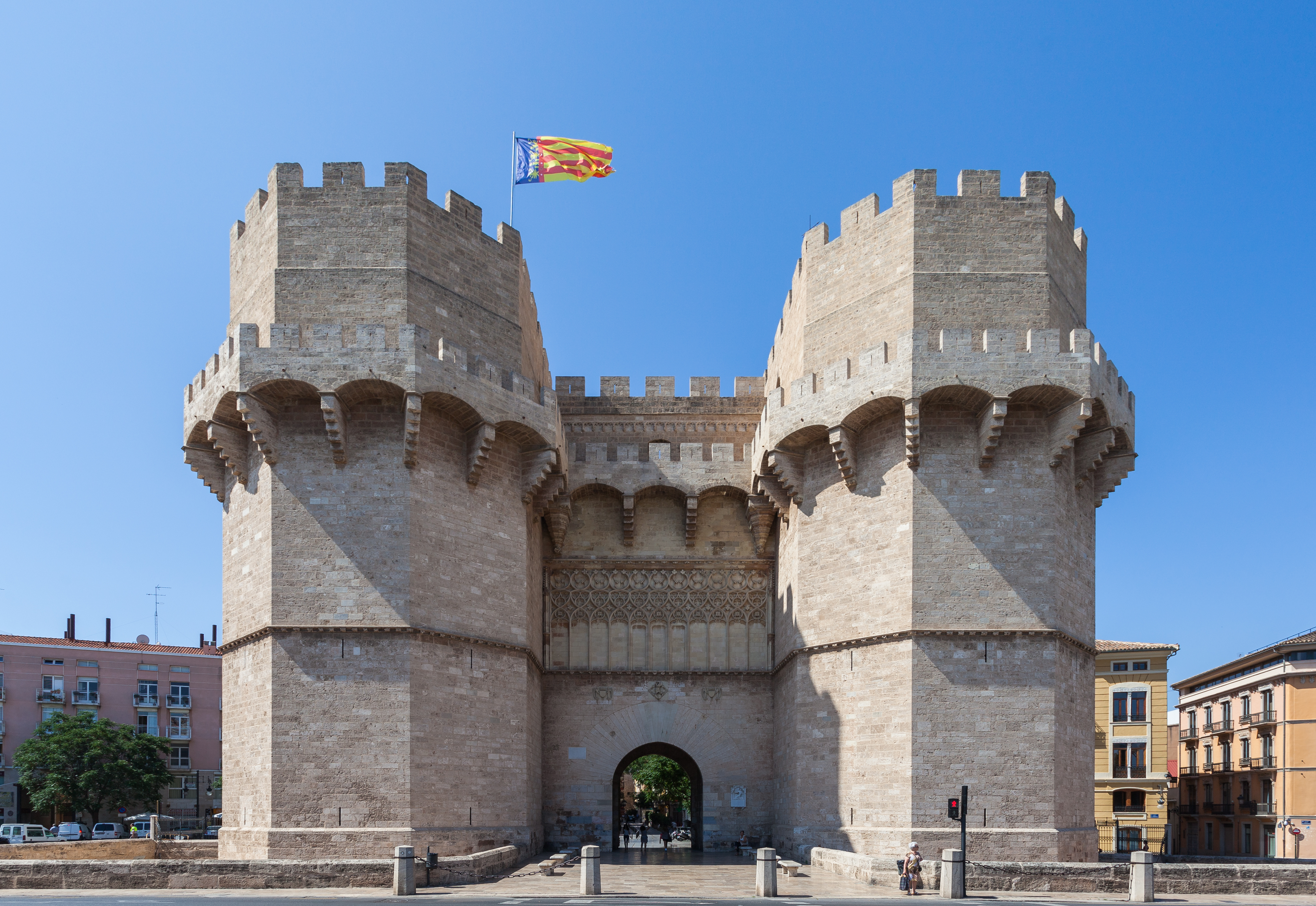
Exterior façade of the monumental Serrano Gate, built in the 14th century

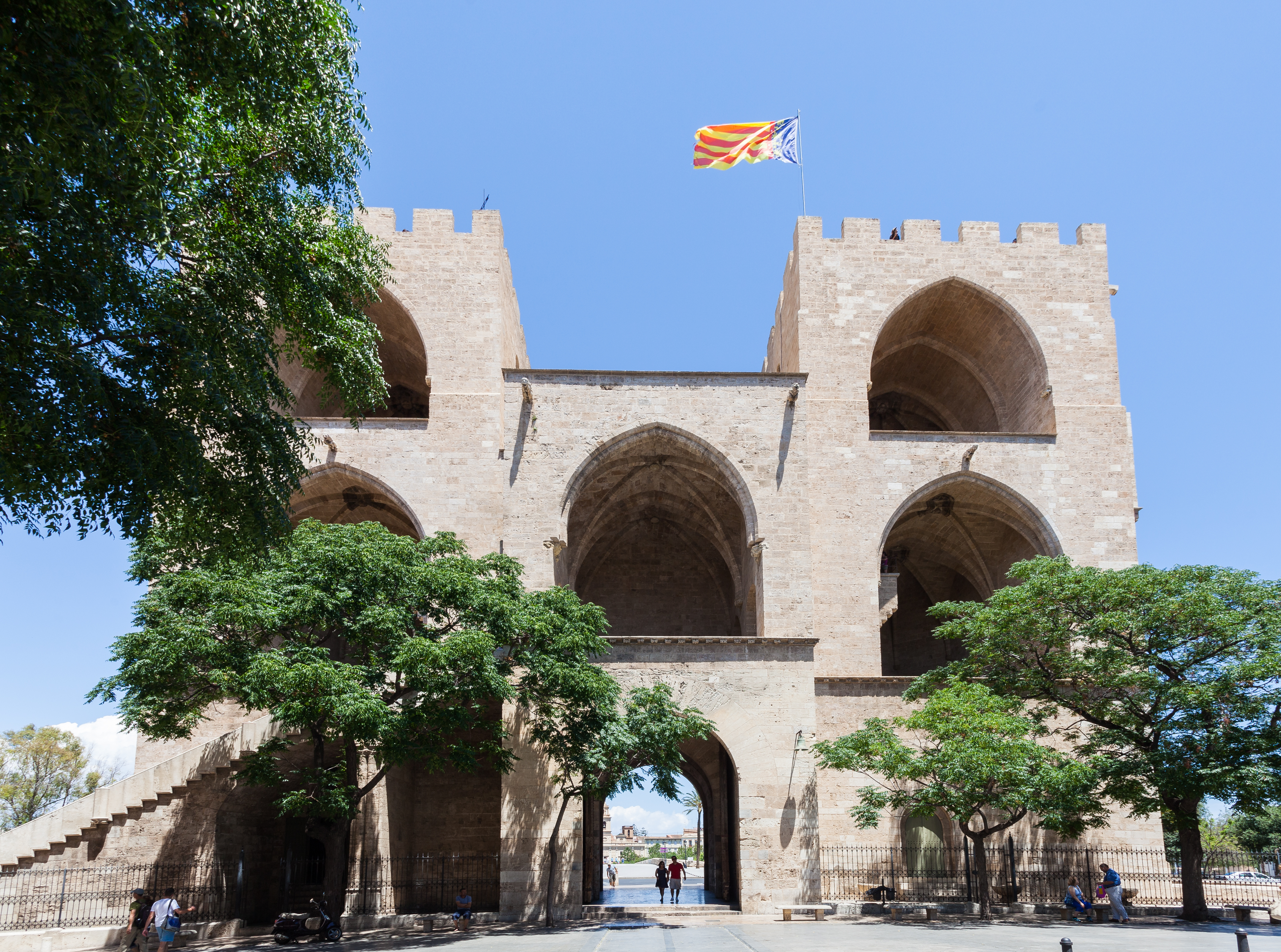
View of the city-side approach.

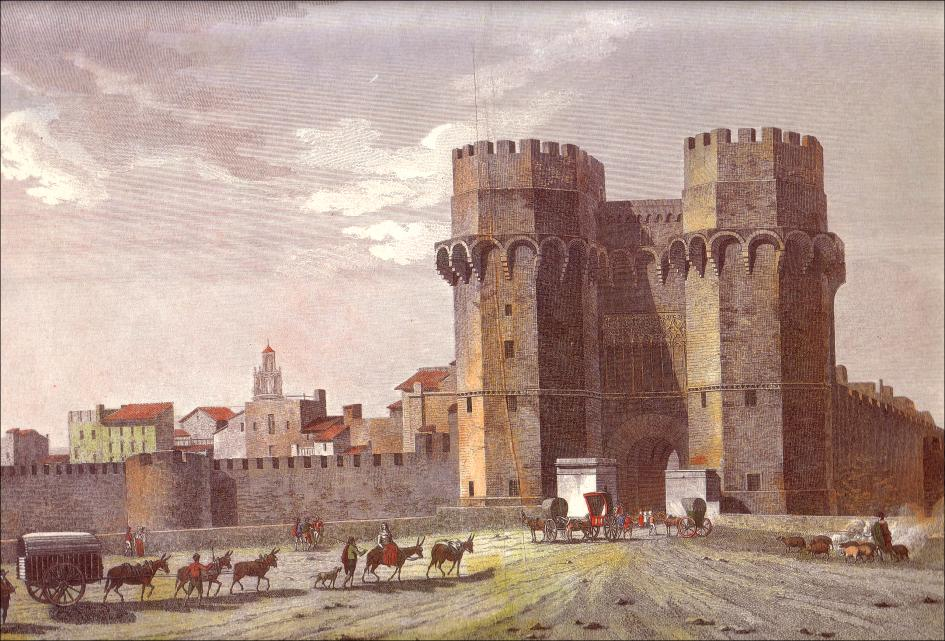
Torres de Serranos and the city walls of Valencia in an old drawing

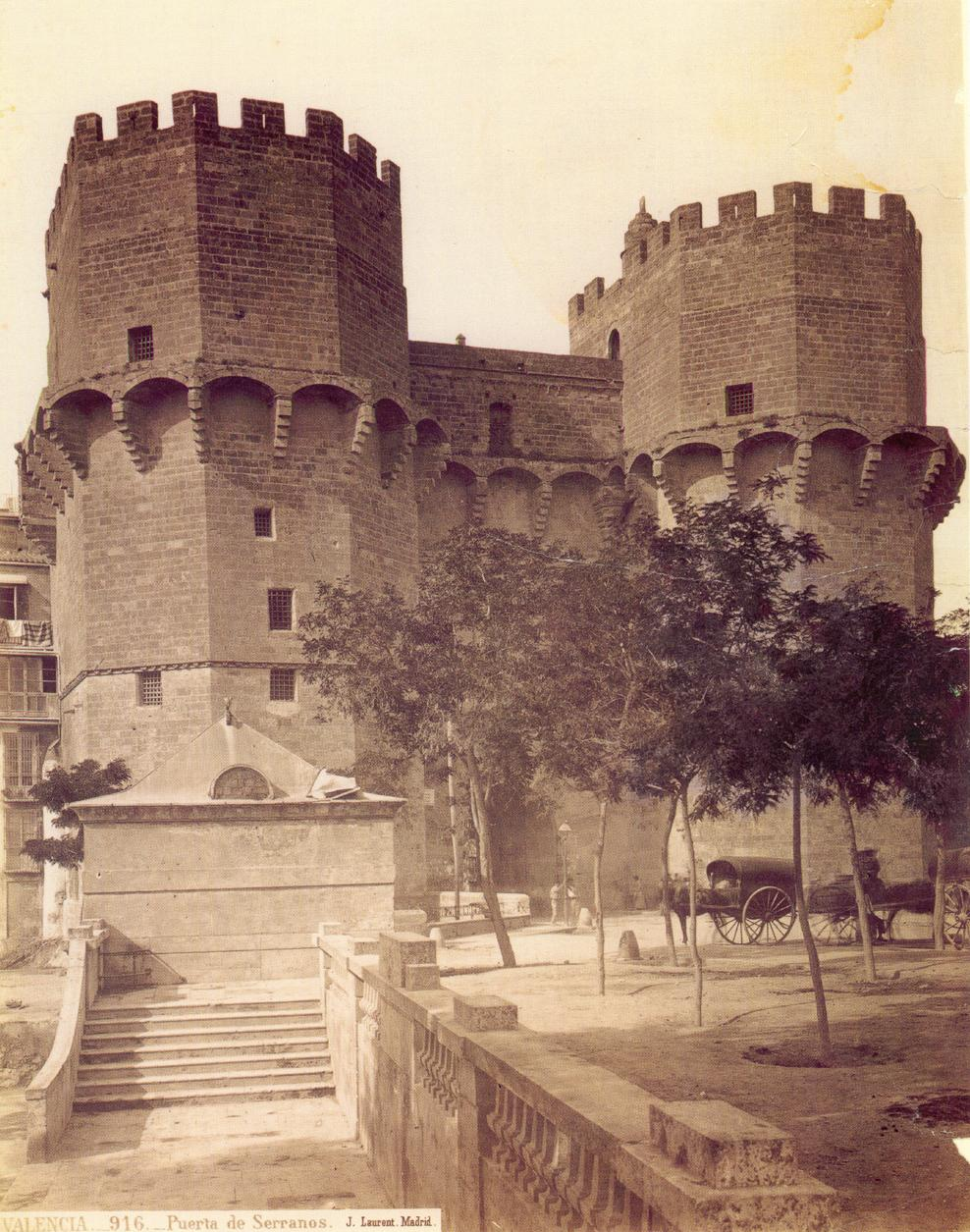
The towers in 1870, when they were a prison. Photograph by Ainaud, commissioned by J. Laurent.

The Serrans Gate or Serranos Gate (Valencian: Porta dels Serrans, Valencian: [ˈpɔɾta ðels seˈrans]; Spanish: Puerta de Serranos, [ˈpweɾta ðe seˈranos]), also known as Serrans Towers or Serranos Towers (Valencian: Torres dels Serrans, Valencian: [ˈtorez ðels seˈrans]; Spanish: Torres de Serranos, [ˈtores ðe seˈranos]) is one of the twelve gates that formed part of the ancient city wall, the Christian Wall (Muralla cristiana), of the city of Valencia, Spain. It was built in Valencian Gothic style at the end of the 14th century (between 1392 and 1398).

It is an important landmark and one of the best preserved monuments of Valencia. Of the ancient city wall, which was pulled down in 1865 on the orders of the provincial governor Cirilio Amorós, only the Serrans Towers, the 15th century Quart Towers, and some other archaeological remains and ruins, such as those of the Jewish Gate (Puerta de los Judíos), have survived.

== Construction and structure ==
Commissioned by the Valencian government, the Serrans Towers were built by the architect Pere Balaguer, who was inspired by other Gothic gates with polygonal towers, such as the Porta de Sant Miquel in Morella and the Royal Gate (Porta Reial) of the Poblet Monastery, showing Genoese influences.

Construction began on 6 April 1392, on the site of an older gateway.

The walls consist of solid stone, as their main purpose was fortification. However, they are covered with a cladding of limestone, mainly from Alginet, a town near Valencia, in order to give the building a more luxurious, distinguished appearance.

In 1397, when the works were nearly finished, it became apparent that the access to the main floor had to be improved. An enormous, monumental stone staircase was built, enlarging the building and facilitating its use for welcoming parties. The works were completed in March 1398.

== History and uses ==
For a long time, the gate's main purpose was to defend the city in the event of a siege or attack, but it was also regularly used for ceremonies, such as official welcoming ceremonies for ambassadors and kings, as it was (and still is) deemed to be the main entrance to the city.

After one of the main prisons of Valencia burnt down in 1586, the towers were turned into a prison for knights and the nobility until the prisoners were transferred to the monastery of Saint Austin in 1887. Since then, they have been used for different purposes, for instance for a wide range of official ceremonies and as a museum.

During the Spanish Civil War, works of art from the Prado Museum were stored in the building, which made a number of modifications necessary; in December 1936, a 90-centimeter layer of reinforced concrete was laid on the first floor in order to protect the pieces of art, stored on the lower floor, in case the towers were damaged or destroyed in a bombing raid. The reinforced concrete was covered by a one-meter layer of rice husk (to cushion the impact) and a one-meter layer of soil. Another one-meter layer of soil was laid on the second floor, and the terrace was covered with sandbags. Moreover, an automatic system of humidity and temperature control was installed. This project was directed by José Lino Vaamonde, the architect of the Artistic Treasures Board (Junta Central de Salvamento del Tesoro Artístico).

== Restoration ==
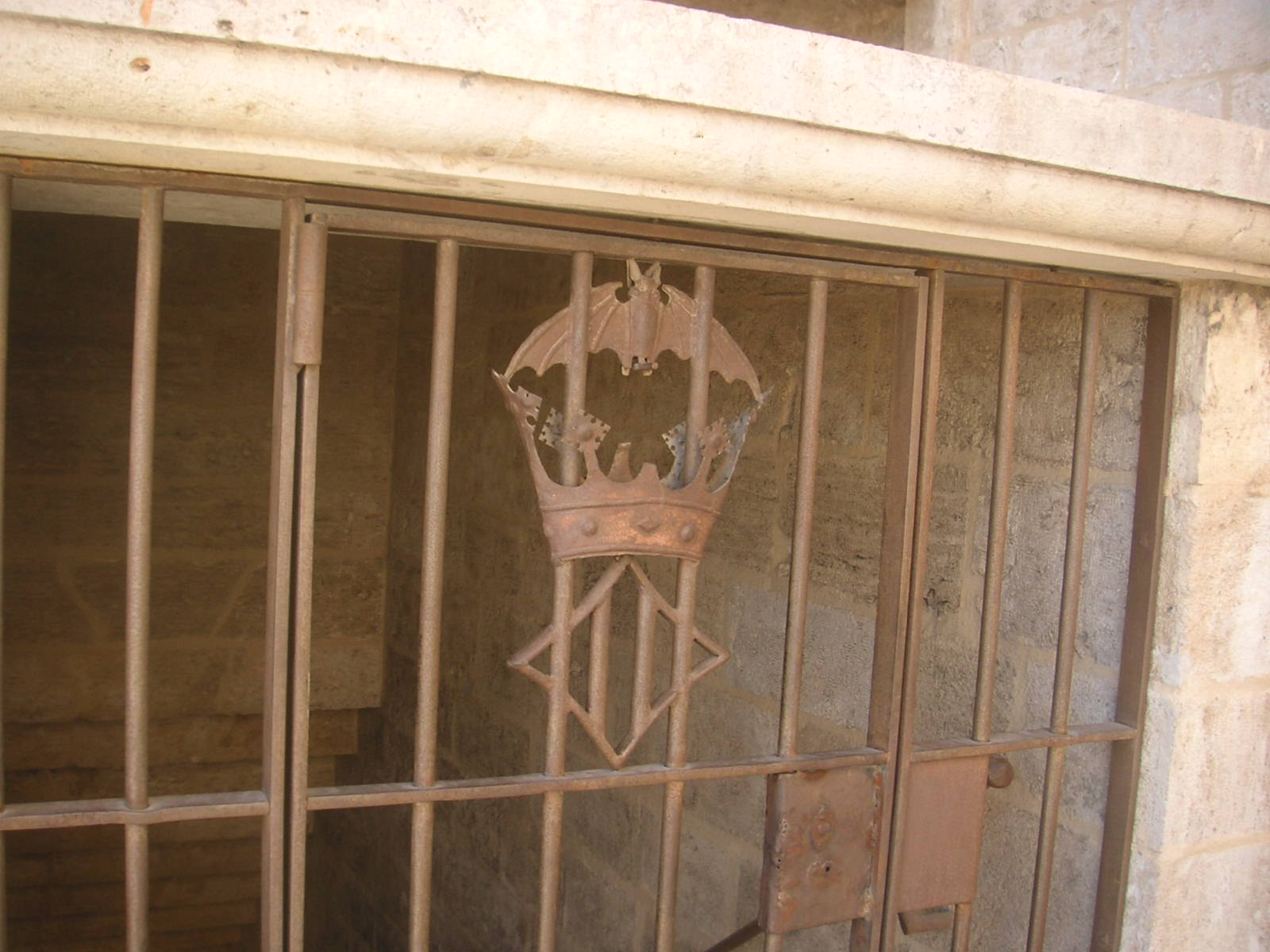
Valencian coat of arms with the crown of the kingdom and the bat, decorating a grille of a door to the interior staircases.

Like the Quart Towers (Torres de Quart), the Serranos Towers survived the demolition of the city wall due to their use as a prison, but the building, especially its internal structure, was damaged. Thus, the large arches opening out onto the internal part of the building were walled up, several windows were built into the outside walls, and the battlements crowning the towers disappeared. In 1871, the city council decided to fill in the ditch in front of the gate, which affected the appearance of the building. Between 1893 and 1914, its restoration, directed by the sculptor José Aixá, was carried out by the Real Academia de Bellas Artes de San Carlos de Valencia.

In 2000, the stone surfaces were cleaned, giving the building its current appearance.

== Current uses ==
At present, the Serranos Towers are open to the public. They are also used for different official ceremonies of the City of Valencia, the most famous of which is the crida, the opening ceremony of the Fallas. On the last Sunday of February, the Fallera Mayor (the "first lady" of the Fallas festivities) declares the Fallas open from a platform erected in front of the building, which is followed by the singing of the anthem of the Valencian Community and Marcha Real.
