= Concatedral de San Nicolás, Alicante =

Roman Catholic co-cathedral in Alicante, Spain

Alicante Co-Cathedral
- Co-Cathedral of St. Nicholas of Bari
- Cocatedral de Sant Nicolau de Bari; Concatedral de San Nicolás de Bari
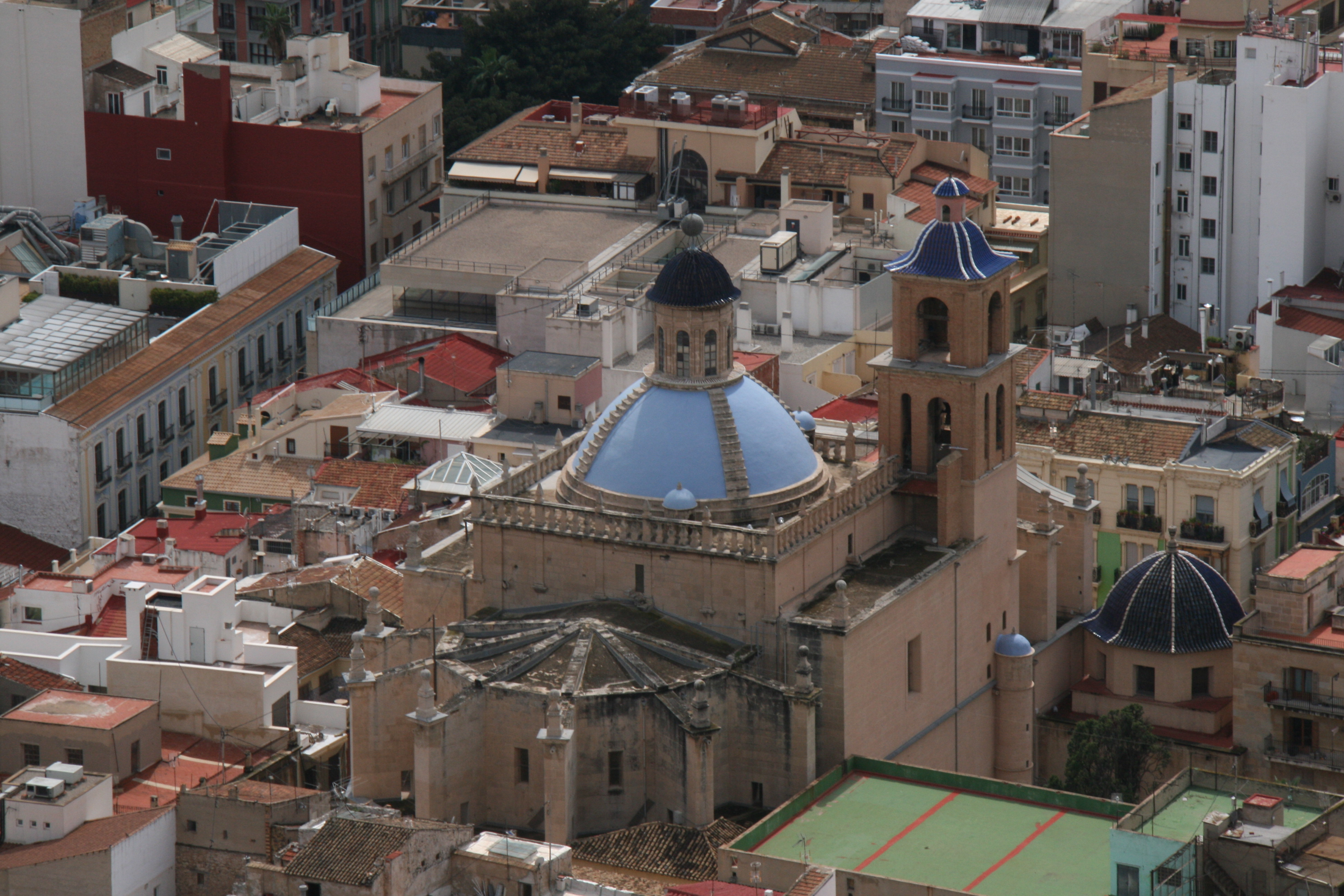
- East view of the apse, tower and dome.
- Alicante Co-Cathedral
- 38°20′43.5″N 0°28′57″W
- Location: Alicante
- Address: 2, Plaza del Abad Penalva
- Country: Spain
- Denomination: Catholic Church
- Website: concatedralalicante.com

History
- Status: Co-cathedral
- Dedication: Saint Nicholas

Architecture
- Functional status: Active
- Architect: Agustín Bernardino
- Style: Valencian Gothic, Baroque
- Groundbreaking: c. 1613
- Completed: c. 1660

Administration
- Archdiocese: Valencia
- Diocese: Orihuela-Alicante

Clergy
- Bishop: José Ignacio Munilla Aguirre

Spanish Cultural Heritage
- Type: Non-movable
- Criteria: Monument
- Designated: 15 June 1974
- Reference no.: RI-51-0003945

The Co-Cathedral of St. Nicholas of Bari (Valencian: Cocatedral de Sant Nicolau de Bari; Spanish: Concatedral de San Nicolás de Bari) is a Catholic co-cathedral located in Alicante, in the Valencian Community of Spain. The church, part of the Diocese of Orihuela-Alicante is dedicated to Saint Nicholas and was elevated to the title of cathedral on 9 March 1959 by Pope John XXIII.

== Design ==
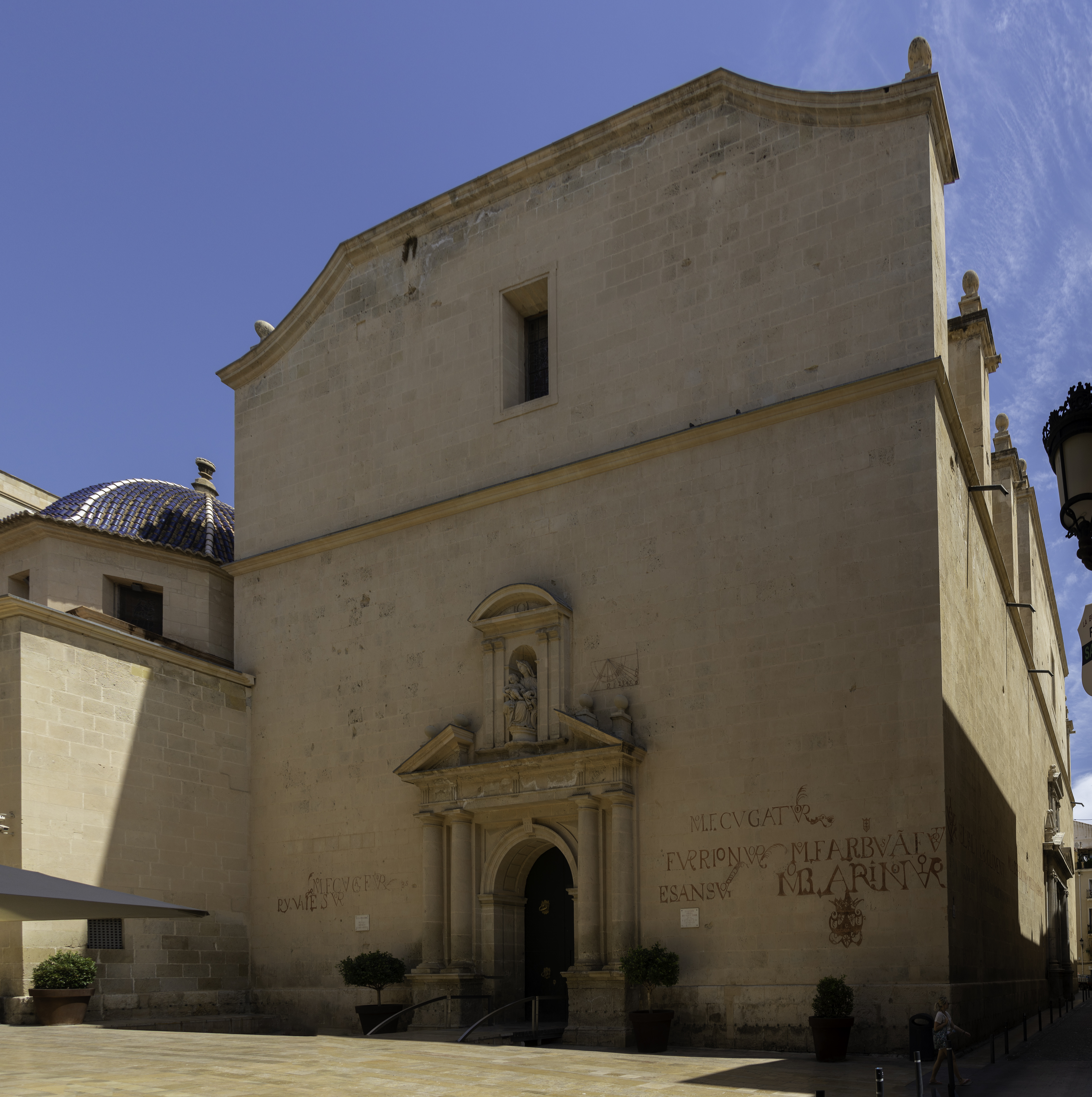
West façade in 2021

This church was built between 1613 and 1662. It was designed between 1610 and 1615 by Agustín Bernardino, a student of Juan de Herrera, and was constructed over an ancient mosque. The older cloister was built originally in the 15th century in Valencian Gothic style.

The cathedral has a Latin cross plan, though the transepts are quite short. Flanking the nave are six interconnecting side chapels and an ambulatory around the apse. A blue dome rises 45 meters above the crossing. The chapel of Holy Communion, configured as a small Greek cross-planned temple, is considered to be one of the most beautiful examples of the Spanish Baroque.

The external appearance of the cathedral is quite sober. The main facade located on the east side is of the Doric order, and the one built on the south side is of Ionic order.
