= Raspall team championship =

The Campionat per Equips de Raspall (Valencian for Team Raspall Championship) is the Valencian pilota Raspall modality league played by professional pilotaris.

== Statistics ==
Year	Winner	Runner-up	Score	Trinquet
2007	Malonda IV, Alberto and Leandro III	Loripet, Salva and Dorín	25-15	Bellreguard
2006	Juan Gràcia, Armando and Galán	Loripet, Agustí and Juan Carlos	25-5	Gandia
2005	Loripet, Moro and Batiste II	Waldo and Galán	25-5	Gandia
2004	Waldo and Vilare	Gorxa, Agustí and Leandro I	25-0	Gandia
2003	Waldo and Francisco	Batiste II, Carlos and Javi		
2002	Carlos and Francisco	Waldo and Vilare		
2001	Fede, Agustí and Ernesto	Salva, Galán and Coeter II		
2000	Batiste and Alberto	Waldo and Francisco		
1999	Waldo and Moro	Santi, Tonet and Vilare		
1998	Batiste and Agustí	Carlos and Morera		Gandia
1997	Armando and Terrilla	Batiste and Agustí		Gandia
1996	Batiste and Moro	Juan and Terrilla		Gandia
1995	Armando and Morera	Batiste and Terrilla		Gandia
1994	Gorxa and Moro	Artal and Morera		Gandia
1993	Loripet and Ernesto			Gandia
1992	Pepito, Alberto and Félix			Gandia
1991	Loripet and Francisquet			Gandia
1990	Coeter and Leandro I			Gandia
1989	Pasqual II and Pinet			Gandia
1988	Malonda II, Balduino and Francisquet			Gandia
1987	Simatero, Pasqualito and Antònio			Gandia
1986	Simatero, Pasqualito and Antònio			Oliva
1985	Miguel de Costa, Sanchis and Lluís			Benidorm
1984	Miguel de Costa, Leandro I and Julio			Gandia

== See also ==
- Valencian pilota
- Raspall
