= Raspall =

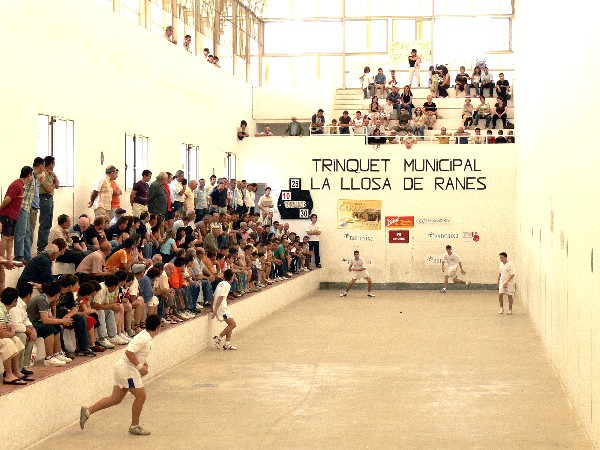
Raspall match at La Llosa de Ranes

Raspall (Valencian: [rasˈpaʎ], "scraping") is a variant of the handball game Valencian pilota, played mainly in the Valencian regions south to the Xúquer river: the Vall d'Albaida, the Safor, the Costera, the Marina Alta and the Marina Baixa. It is also popular in the Ribera Baixa. It is one of only two variants that have professional players—the other being Escala i corda.

The game may be played either indoors in a trinquet or outdoors on the street. In either case the playing area is divided into two halves called the "serving" and "receiving" fields. Among its distinguishing features is the lack of any formal divider between the two halves and the rule that the ball is allowed to bounce as many times as desired. This rule makes the game one of the most energetic variants of Valencian pilota, as the players must frequently stoop to hit the ball close to the ground.

== Etymology ==
"Raspall" matches may be played in a trinquet or on a street, with some minor changes on the rules.

== Playing areas ==
The playing area is divided in two halves, called the "serving" and the "receiving" fields. Neither net nor line on the ground mark the boundary between the two areas.

If played outdoors, the chosen street must be flat and straight, around 75 m long and 8 m wide. It doesn't matter much if there are some irregularities such as balconies, traffic signals, since they may be used as traps for tricky effects on the ball. The ends of the street are called the "fault lines", that is, if the ball bounces on the ground behind them the defending team loses the "quinze". Spectators may seat behind those "fault lines" or on one of the sidewalks.

When played indoors in a trinquet (the most renowned is El Zurdo of Gandia), fans consider carefully where to sit. To watch the game from the galleries gives a layer of safety while to watch from llotgeta gets more exposure to collateral physical damage. While most sit on the stairs as players usually don't throw the ball there, they feel safe.

== Ball and clothes ==
Vaqueta ball

In the raspall a kind of ball called vaqueta ball (Catalan for little cow ball) is used; it is a small and extremely fast ball, very tough and a good bouncer. The name comes from the fact that it is made of cow leather. The sizes for adults are 42 mm diameter, 138 mm circumference, and 42 grams of weight.

Due to the extreme toughness of this sport, players must wear special protections on the hands: Readying the hand.

Players wear red or blue, red being the colour of the allegedly stronger team or the favourite in the bets. Since they are stooping many times during the match they wear short trousers.

== Rules ==
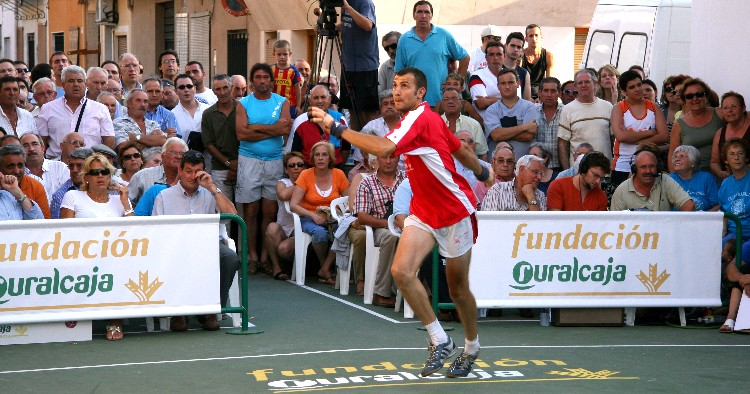
Serving the ball

Raspall can be played in one-on-one matches, but it is most often played as a team sport. Teams have two or three players. Opposing teams do not necessary have the same number of members. Evenly matched sides make the game more interesting to betters, so matches will often oppose three average players against a twosome consisting of a strong and weak player.

The winner of a "Raspall" match is the team who attains 25 points (if playing in a trinquet), or 40 points (if on a street). Points are counted in five blocks called jocs. That is, a match is played until a team gets five "jocs". Every "joc" consists of four quinzes: 15, 30, val and joc. Whoever wins the "val" gets the "joc" and scores five points.

Teams play face to face, throwing each other the ball with one hit of the hand until one of them is not able to send it back to the opponents ("fault" by the loser and so a quinze for the winner), or the ball is sent to a place where it can't be thrown back (direct quinze). Those special places are the "llotgeta" and the "galleries" (if the match is played in a trinquet or the ball is sent behind the opponent's "line fault" (if it is played on a street).

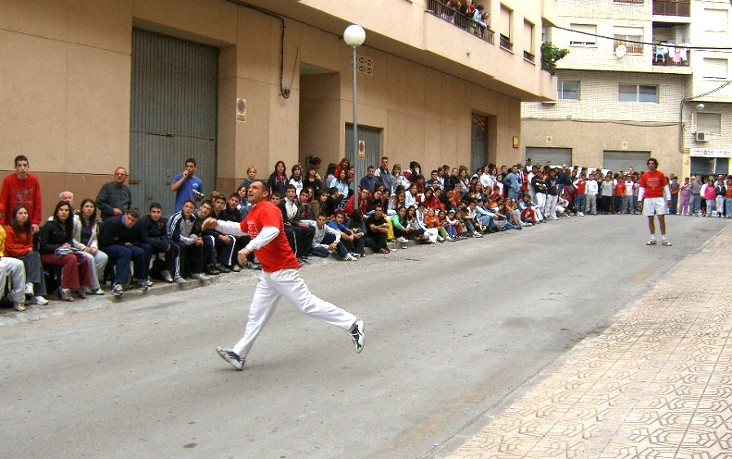
Raspall match at Callosa d'En Sarrià

The "quinze" begins when a player serves by bouncing the ball in the "dau" square (if in a trinquet) or on a marked stone from the "fault line" (on a street). It doesn't matter if the ball bounces on the ground as many times as needed. But, in the case the match is played in a trinquet, if the ball rebounds on the "rest" or "dau" walls it must be thrown back after the very first bounce (if it didn't bounce yet) or when it's on the air (if it already bounced).

If the ball is sent to the spectators on the street's sidewalk (or the trinquet's "escales") the ball is immediately "blocked"; that is, it will be placed in the middle of the street or trinquet where it was blocked and a player of the opposing team will hit it from there. This way, it is not convenient that balls get blocked, since players used to be able to throw it up to the "galleries" or far away the "fault line".

== Competitions ==
- Raspall singles championship
- Raspall team championship
