= Simat de la Valldigna =

- Municipality
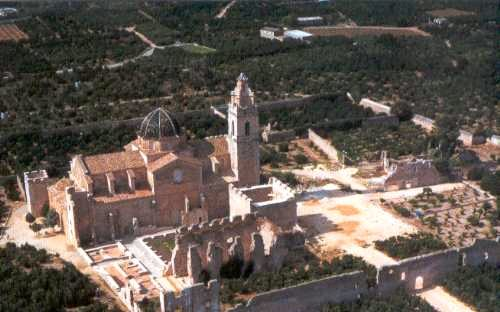

- Coat of arms

- Location of Simat de la Valldigna in the Province of Valencia Location of Simat de la Valldigna in the Valencian Community Location of Simat de la Valldigna in Spain
- Coordinates: 39°2′40″N 0°18′46″W
- Country: Spain
- Autonomous community: Valencian Community
- Province: Valencia
- Comarca: La Safor
- Judicial district: Sueca

Government
  - Mayor: Victor Mansanet (2015) (EUPV)

Area
  - Total: 38.5 km^{2} (14.9 sq mi)
- Elevation: 45 m (148 ft)

Population (2025-01-01)
  - Total: 3,311
  - Density: 86.0/km^{2} (223/sq mi)
- Demonym(s): Simater, simatera
- Time zone: UTC+1 (CET)
  - Summer (DST): UTC+2 (CEST)
- Postal code: 46750
- Official language(s): Valencian
- Website: Official website

Simat de la Valldigna (Valencian pronunciation: [siˈmad de la ˌvaʎˈdiŋna]) is a municipality in the comarca of Safor in the Valencian Community, Spain. It is 50 km from Valencia, and 20 km from Cullera and Gandia. It is also near Xàtiva and Alzira.

It is one of the four villages which are a part of La Valldigna. It is a natural area, which is surrounded by the mountains of the Serra de Corbera, in the north, by the Montdúver in the south, and by the Mediterranean Sea to the east.

== Geography ==
=== Access ===
Coming from Valencia the V-31 must be taken, and afterwards the CV-42 and the CV-50. The final access is through the CV-600.

=== Census-designated places ===
There are two hamlets in the municipality of Simat de la Valldigna: Pla de Corrals and Les Foies.

=== Neighbouring villages ===
The municipality of Simat de la Valldigna is bordered by the municipalities of Benifairó de la Valldigna, Xeresa, Barx, Quatretonda, Barxeta, Carcaixent and Pinet, which are in the province of Valencia.

== Climate ==
Simat de la Valldigna has a privileged climate. Since it is placed in the middle of a valley and it is surrounded and protected by the mountains, the weather is mild, with hot summers and warm winters. Together with the areas of la Safor and part of the Marina Alta, Simat has one of the highest rain indices of the Valencian Country.

== History ==
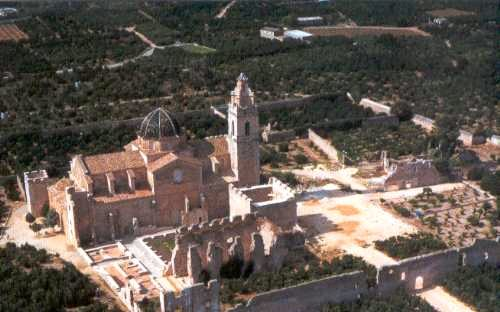
Cistercian Monastery of Saint Mary of Valldigna

The land around Simat de la Valldigna has been inhabited since the beginning of history, as the coves de Bolomor in Tavernes de la Valldigna, and Medalletes and Parpalló in Barx show. Nonetheless, the first concrete historical references appear during the Muslim period. The Christian conquest of the 13th century began a new period in this village history. James I conquered these lands, but his grandson James II gave them to the Cistercian order. When James II came back from an expedition against the kingdoms of Murcia and Almeria at the end of the 13th century, they came through the vall d'Alfàndec (ancient name of the Valldigna valley). Then the king was impressed by the valley's beauty, and he exclaimed (speaking to the Cistercian Santes Creus monastery abbot): Vall digna per a un monestir de la vostra religió! (A suitable valley for a monastery of your order). The Santes Creus abbot replied: Vall digna! (Suitable valley). On 15 March 1297 James II of Aragon donated the vall d'Alfàndec (Alfàndec valley) to the Cistercian order in order to found a monastery devoted to the Virgin Mary. Since this moment, the Alfàndec valley will change its name and it will be called Valldigna.

Initially Christians and Muslims lived together in the Valldigna area. They worked in the lands that the monastery abbot lent them in usufruct, even though the conditions were harder for the Muslims. Nonetheless, they were allowed to remain as Muslims. The Valldigna Moorish people gathered around the la Xara mosque in order to pray. In this place they received teaching as well, contracts were made, and the Muslims judges made trials. This coexistence ended in 1609, with the expulsion from Spain of all Moorish people. Life in the Valldigna valley went on, according to the evolution of the feudal society, under the rule of the monastery and its abbot. It lasted until 1835, when all monasteries in Spain were seized by the State (in what was called the desamortización de Mendizábal). Then the rule of the monastery and its abbot over the valley and its people ended, and a time of neglect, ruins and destruction of the monastery began. It was a private property until 1991, when the Generalitat Valenciana (Valencian regional government) bought it.

== Culture ==
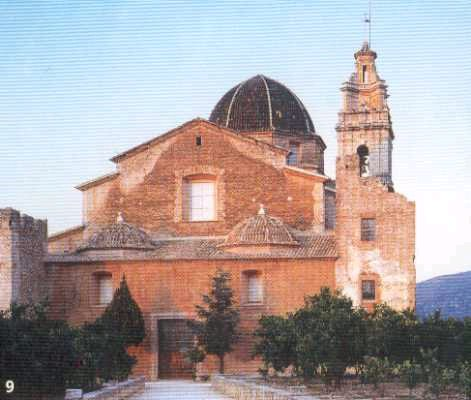
Monastery of Saint Mary of Valldigna

The most important monument of the village is the Monastery of Santa María de la Valldigna. It was founded in 1297 by James II of Aragon. Since the beginning, it was one of the most important monasteries of the Cistercian order. It was founded by the monks of Santes Creus in the Tarragona province. The whole Valldigna valley belonged to the monks, according to a royal order. The monastery was inhabited by monks until 1835, when a revolt in the Valldigna valley took place after the Ecclesiastical Confiscations of Mendizábal. After that, the monks were forced to abandon the monastery. Most of its goods and works of art were sold, plundered or destroyed. After decades of abandonment, many restorations projects are envisaged, and nowadays the monastery of Santa Maria de Valldigna is, according to the 57th article of the Statute of Autonomy of the Valencian Community, "the spiritual, historical and cultural temple of the ancient Kingdom of Valencia. It is as well a symbol of the grandeur of the Valencian people". The same article states that "the Generalitat Valenciana will recover, restore and preserve the monastery (...) a law from the Valencian Parliament will determine the destiny and usage of the monastery as a meeting point of all Valencians, and as a research center for the recovery of the Valencian Community history".

Simat de la Valldigna was the first village from the Valencian Country that requested a .cat domain for the town hall website.

== Monuments ==
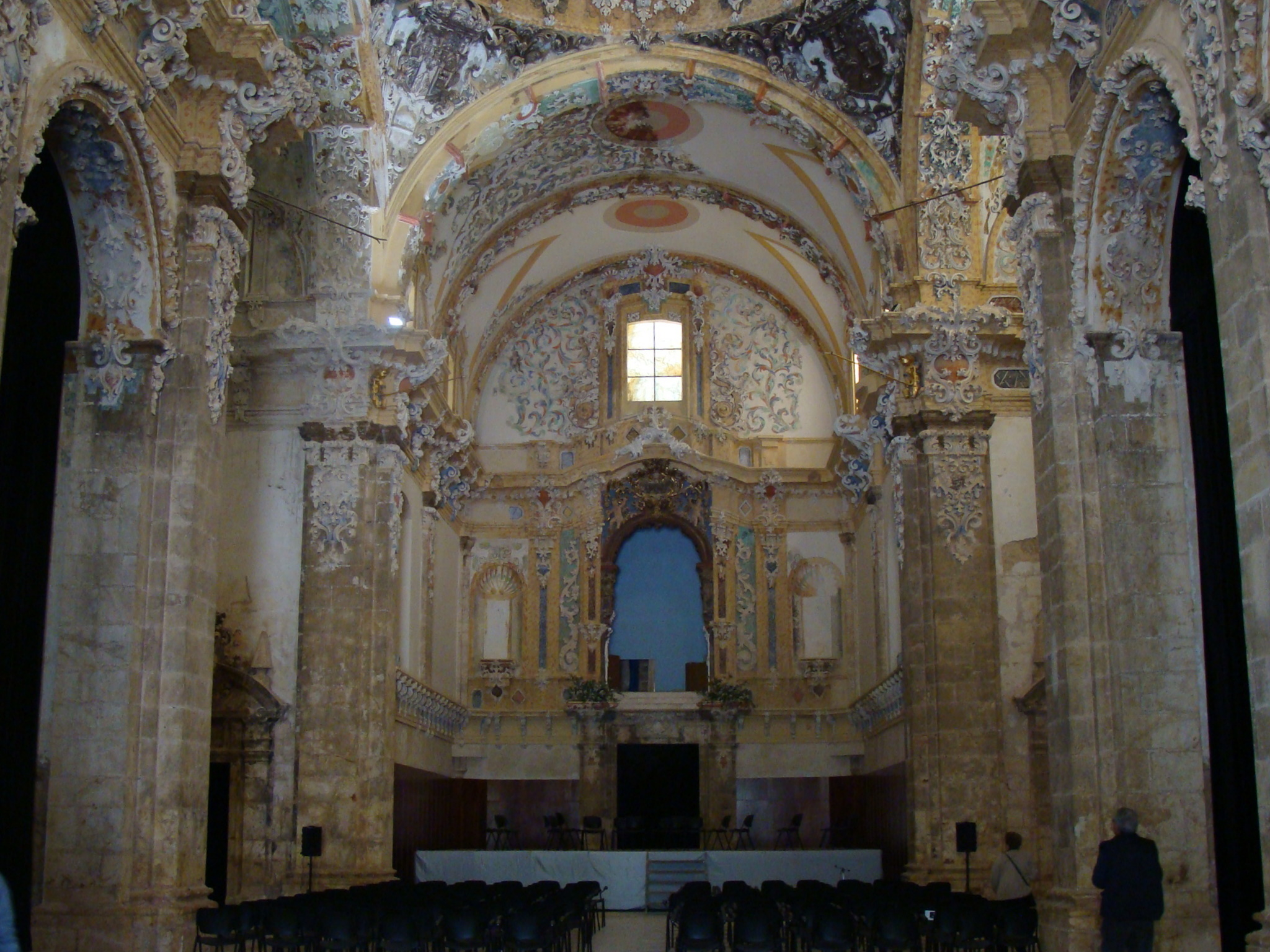
Image from inside the church of the Cistercian monastery of Saint Mary of Valldigna, in restoration (January 2008)

- Monastery of Santa María de la Valldigna : It is the most interesting monument of the whole valley. It is placed in the municipality of Simat de la Valldigna. It was an ancient Cistercian monastery, that was neglected and in ruins, until the Generalitat Valenciana (Valencian regional government) began a process of restoration that still lasts.
- La Xara mosque or Saint Anne hermitage. It is a little hermitage, which is placed in the middle of the orange fields. It is the only remaining building from the ancient village of la Xara, which was abandoned in 1609, after the expulsion of the Moorish people from Spain. It is the building of the old mosque. It is rectangular, and there is a gate in the eastern part with a horseshoe arch. Four columns divide the building in three naves: Next to the gate there is a spiral staircase, which had the old function of the minaret. The Qibla is the most important element, since it shows the direction of Mecca and thus it was the place towards which the Muslims had to address their prayers. Nowadays the mihrab can also be seen, and also two side gates in the Qibla wall. Outside the mosque there is also the ancient ablutions well.
- Saint Michael Archangel Church. It is the present parish church. It has a baroque style, and the statue of saint Michael is interesting.
- Font Gran (Big fountain in English). It is placed in the middle of the square that has this name, inside the village. It is a natural fountain, with a big pool of water. Here 9 October avenue begins.

== Economy ==
Agriculture is the main economic activity, specially what concerns oranges and citrus in general. In order to market the oranges, there are two cooperatives, where a lot of people from the village work.

Simat economy has the following features: Little supply and demand of specialized workers, poor enterprise mentality and geographical isolation, which makes that Simat enterprises are not very competitive.

Simat has used immigrants (most of all from Eastern Europe) to collect oranges, since the younger people work mainly outside the village.

During the last years, different government administrations had tried to foster the monastery of Santa Maria de Valldigna as a tourist attraction, but the visitors are rather scarce yet.

Simat economy depends on citrus intensively, and this product has lower prices every year.

== Demography ==
Demographic evolution of Simat de la Valldigna
	1990	1992	1994	1996	1998	2000	2002	2004	2005	2006
Population	3.223	3.141	3.148	3.114	3.120	3.112	3.121	3.291	3.228	3.090

== Politics ==
The four main political parties are the following: Spanish Socialist Workers' Party (PSOE) (2 town councilors), People's Party (6 town councilors), Valencian Nationalist Bloc (BNV) (1 town councilors), Arc Iris, which is linked with United Left (EUPV) (1 town councilor) and Republican Left of the Valencian Country (ERPV) (1 town councilor).

Agustina Brines Sirerol (BNV) succeeded Eladi Mainar (PSOE) as mayor, after the vote of no confidence against Mayor Sebastià Mahiques (PP), that took place on 4 August 2008. It was made by PSOE, BNV and ERPV. EUPV-ARC IRIS abstained. The mayor is Sebastià Mahiques (PP).

== Festivities ==
Simat de la Valldigna has many festivities and is famous for that.

- Saint Anthony. On 16 January, the day just before saint Anthony, all Simat population comes to the Town Hall square, where a big bonfire is burned. Afterwards they go to some houses of rich families, where they receive fritters and wine. Finally there is an open-air dance that finishes late at night. On Saint Anthony's day a mass is celebrated, where animals, bread and some traditional cakes (which are typical for this day) are blessed and finally given out.
- Valldigna Day. On 15 March, all the Valldigna population (i.e. the one that belongs to the villages of Barx, Benifairó de la Valldigna, Simat de la Valldigna and Tavernes de la Valldigna) commemorate the foundation of the Cistercian monastery of Saint Mary. There is a mediaeval fair and an open-air dance.
- Saint James and Saint Anne. On 25 and 26 July, Saint James' and Saint Anne's festivities are celebrated.
- Saint Patrons' Festivities. Simat celebrates its saint patrons' festivities on 4, 5 and 6 August. The saint patrons of Simat are the saints Abdon and Sennen.
- 9 October "National Day of the Valencian Country". It is a tradition to make a contest of paella (typical Valencian meal) and also a typical Valencian street band, where the dolçaina (typical Valencian instrument) is played. In the evening there is an open-air dance and the traditional correfoc.

== Important people ==
- Francisco Luis Brines Ferrer, Coeter II, Valencian pilota player.
- Miquel Brines Ferrer, Coeter I, Valencian pilota player.
- Lluís Brines Selfa, professional musician in the Municipal Band of Barcelona and the Gran Teatre del Liceu of Barcelona.
- Luis Francisco Cucarella Mas, Loripet, Valencian pilota player.
- Terenci Miñana i Andrés, el xiquet de Simat, Valencian pilota player.

== See also ==
- List of municipalities in Valencia

== See also ==
- Route of the Monasteries of Valencia
- Route of the Borgias
