= Oliva =

Spanish town on Mediterranean coastline

- Town and Municipality
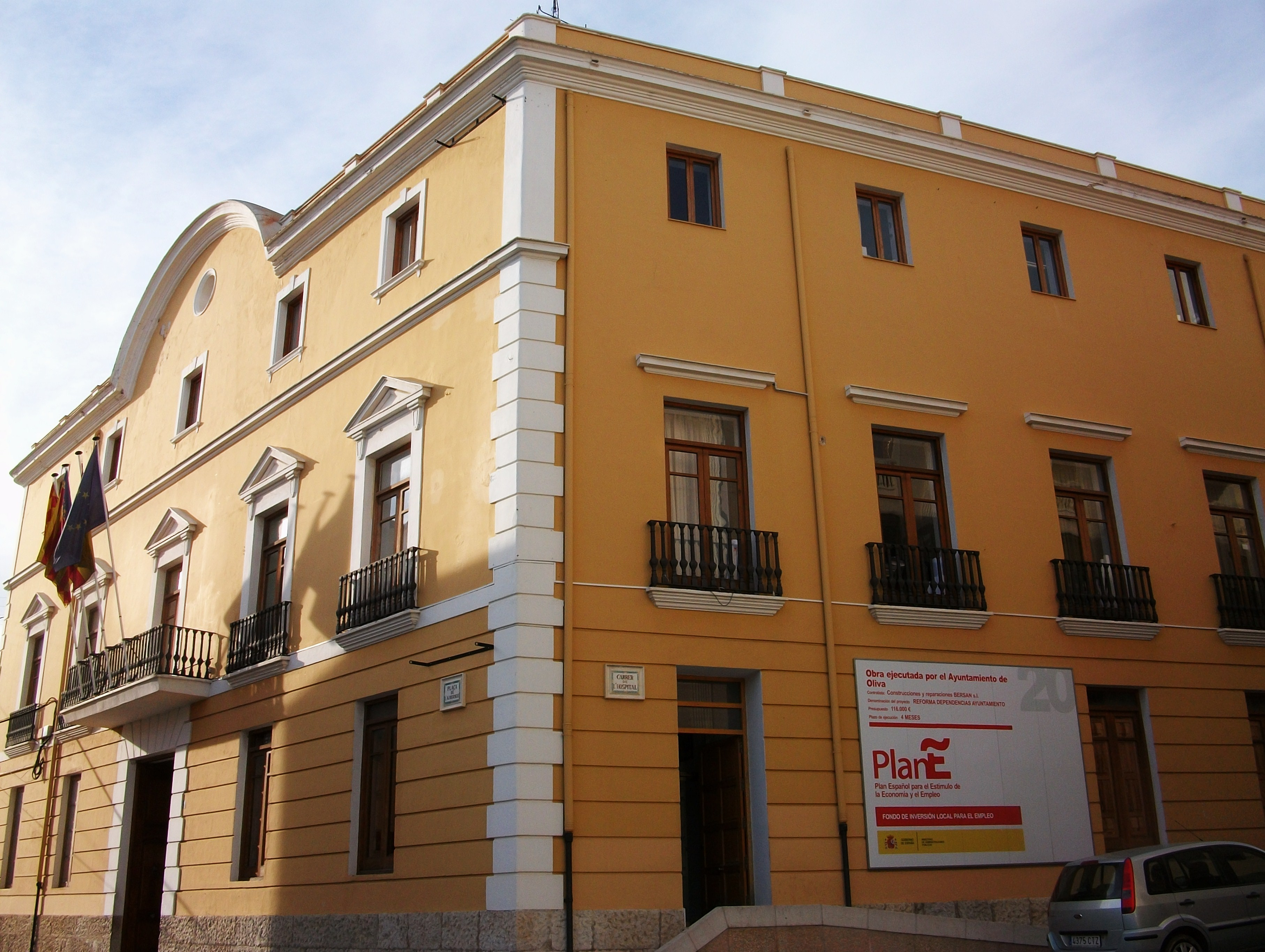
- Town Hall of Oliva

- Flag Coat of arms
- Location of Oliva
- Location within Province of Valencia Location within Valencian Community Location within Spain
- Coordinates: 38°55′10″N 0°7′16″W
- Country: Spain
- Autonomous community: Valencian Community
- Province: Valencia / València
- Comarca: Safor
- Judicial district: Gandia

Government
  - Alcalde (Mayor): Yolanda Pastor Bolo (Projecte Oliva)

Area
  - Total: 59.93 km^{2} (23.14 sq mi)
- Elevation: 25 m (82 ft)

Population (2025-01-01)
  - Total: 26,813
  - Density: 447.4/km^{2} (1,159/sq mi)
- Demonyms: Olivan • oliver, -a (Val.) • olivense (Sp.)
- Official language(s): Valencian; Spanish
- Linguistic area: Valencian
- Time zone: UTC+1 (CET)
  - Summer (DST): UTC+2 (CEST)
- Postal code: 46780
- Website: www.oliva.es

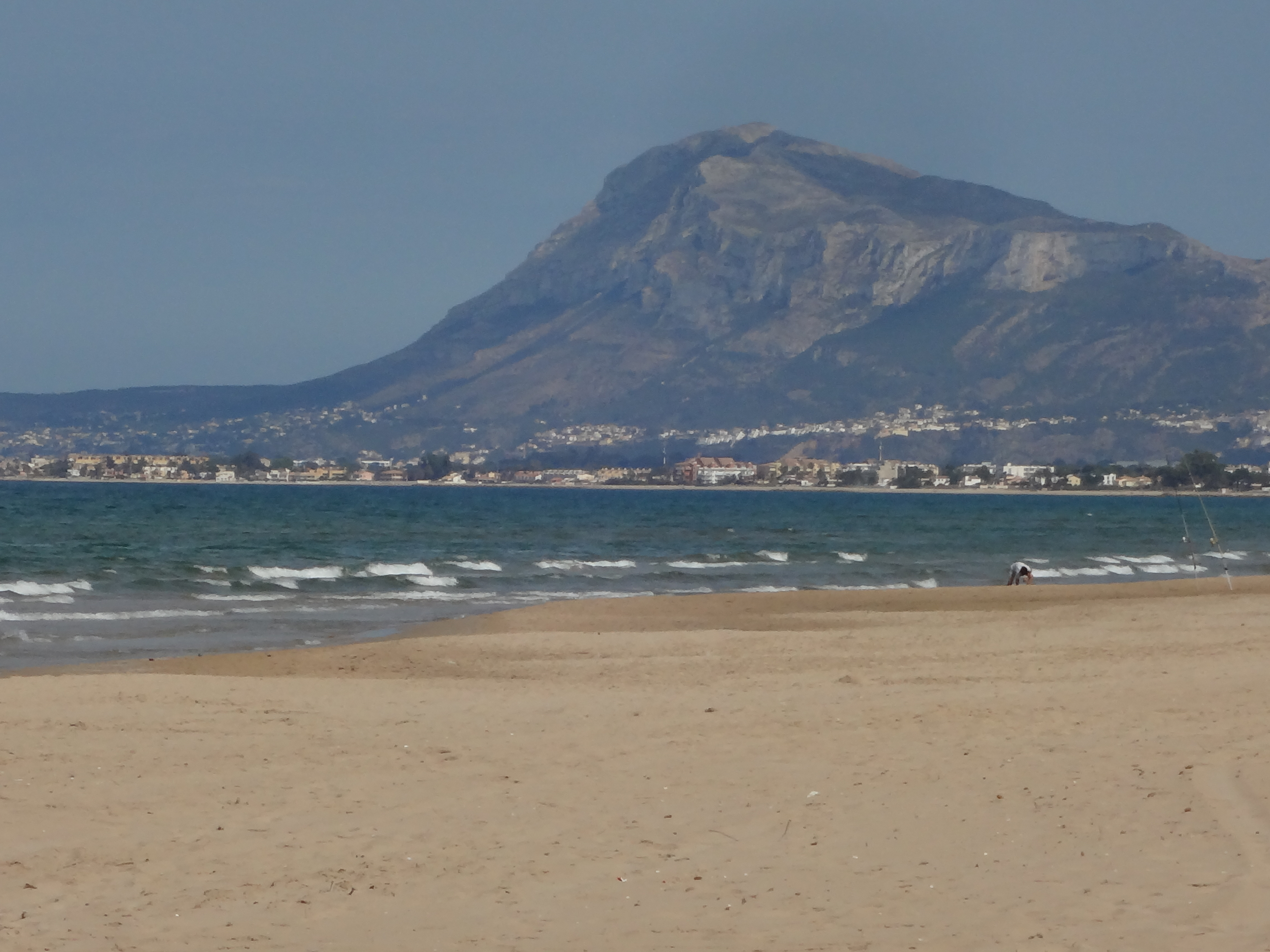
Mediterranean Sea in Oliva

Oliva (Note: Pronunciation of Oliva: Valencian: [oˈliva], locally [oˈlivɛ] Spanish: [oˈliβa]) is a municipality in the comarca of Safor in the Valencian Community, Spain. To its east lie 10 kilometres (6.2 miles) of coastline and beaches fronting the Mediterranean Sea, and 8 kilometres to the north is Gandia.

== Description ==
The Passeig (promenade) runs through the centre of the town, and features a market each Friday. On the left side of the Marina beach is Kiko beach. The blue flagged beaches of Oliva stretch for 7 kilometres (4.3 miles); many contain sand dunes.

Oliva has two big and colourful Moors and Christians festivals (Festes de Moros i Cristians, in Valencian language) in the area; the Falles festa in March, the Moors and Christians in July and Setmana Santa (Holy Week). In the old town there are two churches, Sant Roc and Santa Maria la Major. Sant Roc dates from the 18th–19th centuries, and Santa Maria from the 17th–18th centuries. At the top of the hill in the old town is Santa Anna Castle, built in the 16th century.

In the centre of the town is a Roman kiln situated below one of the blocks of apartments on Santíssim street.

== Economy ==
About 80% of the economy of Oliva is based on the tertiary sector, particularly in commerce, banking, specialty stores, and tourism; currently, there are more than 30 banks in Oliva. The secondary sector makes up about 15% of the economy, with an extended industrial area, located outside of the city, in the south-east of Oliva. The primary sector makes up less than 5% of the local economy, with extended plantations of oranges and tangerines, and minor plantations of avocado, loquat, fig, banana, prickly pear, etc.

== Demography ==
In 2011, Oliva had a population of 28,400 inhabitants, of which 7,466 (26.29%) of the population were immigrants, with the majority coming from Bolivia, Ecuador, Morocco, United Kingdom and Romania. In Oliva there are citizens of more than 50 countries, especially from South America, Europe, Africa and Asia.

In 2011 the unemployment rate in the city was 9.7%. The median income of a person in Oliva in 2011 was €22,400 ($27,637).

== Climate ==
Oliva has a Mediterranean-Subtropical climate (Köppen climate classification: Csa), with more than 230 days above 20 °C (68 °F). The winters are mild and temperate whilst summers are hot and dry. The average annual temperature is about 19 °C (66 °F). In winter, during the cold waves, the minimum temperature can fall slightly under 6 °C (43 °F). Temperatures below the freezing mark and snow are almost unknown in Oliva. Whilst in summer the average day-time temperature ranges from 28 to 32 °C (82 to 90 °F). Temperatures may vary, however during heat waves which occur every year, the temperatures always exceed 38 °C (100.4 °F) and also can exceed 41 °C (105.8 °F). The wettest season is the autumn, while the driest season is the summer. Typically the city has more than 300 days in a year with clear skies.

As of 2021, Oliva has experienced 20 intense floods since 1972.

Climate data for Oliva, Valencia, Spain
Month	Jan	Feb	Mar	Apr	May	Jun	Jul	Aug	Sep	Oct	Nov	Dec	Year
Mean daily maximum °C (°F)	16 (61)	16 (61)	18 (64)	20 (68)	22 (72)	26 (79)	29 (84)	29 (84)	27 (81)	24 (75)	19 (66)	17 (63)	22 (72)
Daily mean °C (°F)	12 (54)	12 (54)	14 (57)	16 (61)	19 (66)	23 (73)	25 (77)	26 (79)	24 (75)	20 (68)	15 (59)	12 (54)	18 (65)
Mean daily minimum °C (°F)	8 (46)	8 (46)	10 (50)	12 (54)	15 (59)	19 (66)	22 (72)	22 (72)	20 (68)	16 (61)	12 (54)	9 (48)	14 (58)
Average precipitation mm (inches)	22.2 (0.87)	23.2 (0.91)	24.6 (0.97)	27.5 (1.08)	22.2 (0.87)	10.2 (0.40)	4.0 (0.16)	9.4 (0.37)	31.7 (1.25)	43.2 (1.70)	36.9 (1.45)	27.1 (1.07)	282.2 (11.1)
Average precipitation days (≥ 1 mm)	4.1	4.0	3.9	4.4	3.8	1.8	0.9	1.7	4.2	5.6	5.4	4.5	44.3
Average snowy days	0.0	0.0	0.0	0.0	0.0	0.0	0.0	0.0	0.0	0.0	0.0	0.0	0.0
Source: Avg temperature and precipitation for Oliva city

== Notable people ==
- Francisco Brines, poet
- David Fuster, footballer
- Enric Morera (1964), a Spanish nationalist politician

== See also ==
- List of municipalities in Valencia
