= Cesare Bomboni =

Italian architect

Cesare Bomboni (August 14, 1850, in Florence – ?) was an Italian architect.

He studied at the Accademia di Belle Arti of Florence, and afterwards with professor Vincenzo Micheli. He took a position as engineer for the city of Pontassieve. Among his many works are the Villino Nesti in Condeglia, near Pistoia, The Israelite Hospice in Florence on Viale Duca di Genova, and the bridge to Santa Brigida over the Mulino del Piano near Pontassieve. He is buried in the Monumental Cemetery of the Misericordia in Antella, which he helped design.
