= Enova =

Enova may refer to:

- Enova SF, a Norwegian government enterprise responsible for promotion of environmentally friendly production and consumption of energy
- L'Ènova, a municipality in the province of Valencia, Spain, also known as Énova
