= Abel Buades =

Spanish footballer (born 1977)

Personal information
- Full name: Abel Buades Vendrell
- Date of birth: 11 July 1977 (age 49)
- Place of birth: Benimodo, Spain
- Height: 1.82 m (6 ft 0 in)
- Position: Midfielder

Youth career
- UD Benimodo
- CD L'Alcudia
- 1993–1995: Albacete

Senior career*
Years	Team	Apps	(Gls)
1995–1999	Gandía	95	(13)
1999–2002	Onda		
2000–2001	→ Racing Ferrol (loan)	3	(0)
2002	Calahorra	14	(0)
2002–2003	Castellón	36	(1)
2003–2007	Gimnàstic	119	(8)
2007	Cádiz	10	(1)
2007–2008	Gimnàstic	32	(2)
2008–2009	Alicante	23	(3)
2009–2010	Alzira	13	(1)
2010	Toledo	17	(2)
2010–2011	Barakaldo	9	(0)
2011–2012	Toledo	30	(4)
2012–2014	Arroyo	60	(6)
2014–2015	Almansa	16	(2)
Total		477	(43)

Managerial career
- 2016: Alzira (youth)
- 2016–2018: Castellonense
- 2018–2019: Acero
- 2019–2020: Olímpic Xàtiva
- * Club domestic league appearances and goals

Abel Buades Vendrell (born 11 July 1977) is a Spanish retired footballer who played as a midfielder, currently a manager.

He amassed Segunda División totals of 143 games and 13 goals, over the course of six seasons. He appeared for Gimnàstic in La Liga, in a 20-year senior career.

== Playing career ==
Born in Benimodo, Valencian Community, Buades spent his first four seasons as a senior representing CF Gandía, in Tercera División and Segunda División B. He then signed with Villarreal CF, being assigned to its farm team CD Onda and also loaned to Segunda División club Racing de Ferrol.

In the following two seasons, Buades played in the third division with CD Calahorra and CD Castellón. In July 2003 he moved to Gimnàstic de Tarragona, being promoted to the second tier at the first attempt and contributing 26 matches in the process. In 2006 another promotion befell, with the player again as first choice.

Buades made his La Liga debut on 27 August 2006, playing the full 90 minutes in a 1–0 away win against RCD Espanyol. He scored his first and only goal in the competition on 28 October, but in a 1–3 home loss to Real Madrid; the Catalans were ultimately relegated, but he had already left in the January transfer window to Cádiz CF in division two.

Buades played in the second and third divisions until his retirement, with Gimnàstic, Alicante CF, UD Alzira, CD Toledo (two stints), Barakaldo CF and Arroyo CP. From 2009 to 2012, he suffered four consecutive team relegations.

On 18 July 2014, at already 37, Buades moved back to the fourth tier, joining UD Almansa. He retired at the end of the season, after appearing sparingly.

== Coaching career ==
Buades started his managerial career in 2016, with former club Alzira's youth setup. On 2 November of that year, he was appointed at UD Castellonense in the regional leagues.

On 3 July 2018, Buades was named coach of CD Acero.
