= Carcer =

Carcer may refer to:

- Carcer (geomancy), a geomancy figure
- Carcer City, a fictional city in Manhunt, Manhunt 2, and Grand Theft Auto
- Carcer Dun, a villain in the Discworld series
- Càrcer, a municipality in the province of Valencia, Spain
- Tullianum, (Italian: Carcere Mamertino) an ancient Roman prison
