= Cotes, Spain =

Cotes
- Municipality
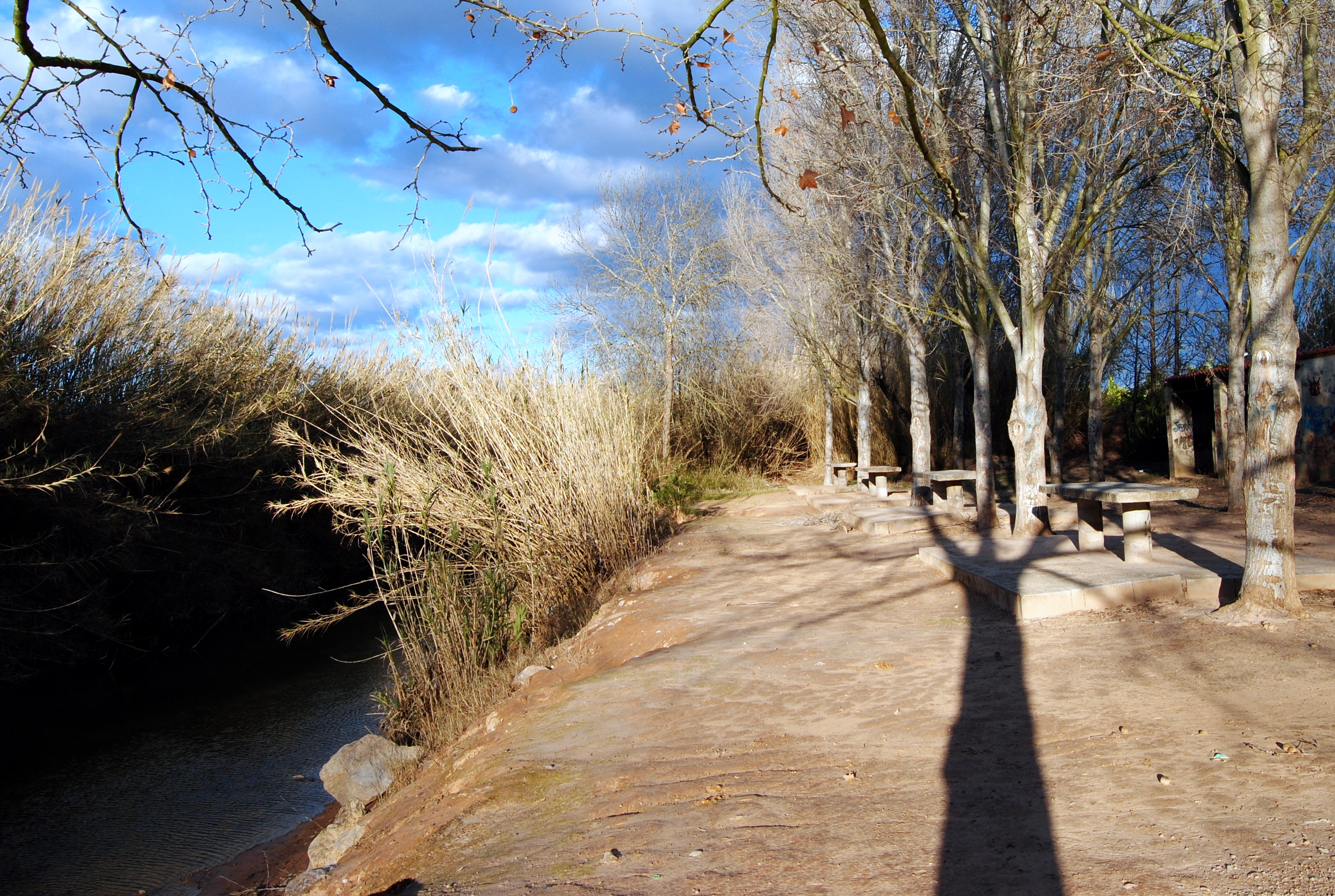

- Coat of arms

- Location in Spain
- Coordinates: 39°4′15″N 0°34′27″W
- Country: Spain
- Autonomous community: Valencian Community
- Province: Valencia
- Comarca: Ribera Alta
- Judicial district: Alzira

Government
  - Alcalde: José Gonzálvez Ramón

Area
  - Total: 6.3 km^{2} (2.4 sq mi)
- Elevation: 33 m (108 ft)

Population (2025-01-01)
  - Total: 314
  - Density: 50/km^{2} (130/sq mi)
- Demonym(s): Coter, cotera
- Time zone: UTC+1 (CET)
  - Summer (DST): UTC+2 (CEST)
- Postal code: 46294
- Official language(s): Valencian
- Website: Official website

Cotes is a municipality in the comarca of Ribera Alta in the Valencian Community, Spain.

== See also ==
- List of municipalities in Valencia
