= Benifaió =

- Municipality
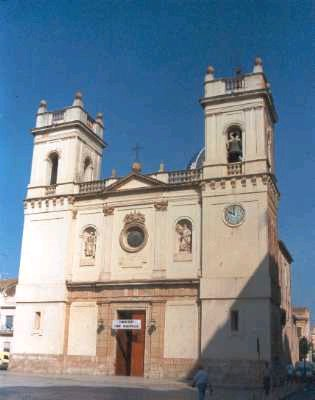

- Coat of arms

- Location in Spain
- Coordinates: 39°17′5″N 0°25′41″W
- Country: Spain
- Autonomous community: Valencian Community
- Province: Valencia
- Comarca: Ribera Alta
- Judicial district: Carlet
- Founded: 1250

Government
  - Alcalde: Marta Ortiz Martínez (PSOE-PSPV)

Area
  - Total: 20.1 km^{2} (7.8 sq mi)
- Elevation: 35 m (115 ft)

Population (2025-01-01)
  - Total: 12,262
  - Density: 610/km^{2} (1,580/sq mi)
- Demonym(s): Benifaioner, benifaionera (Valencian language)
- Time zone: UTC+1 (CET)
  - Summer (DST): UTC+2 (CEST)
- Postal code: 46450
- Official language(s): Valencian, Castilian
- Website: Official website

Benifaió is a municipality in the comarca of Ribera Alta in the Valencian Community, Spain. The central plaza contains a tower built by the Moors.

== Main sights ==
- Tower of la Plaça: It was part of a defensive structure, palace-castle, the adjoining buildings are also part of the palace of Falcó and the old Town Hall. In 1978 the old Town Hall was demolished being the tower free of three parts. Subsequently, it was used as a storehouse, prison, and even a pigeon house. The interior is covered with vaults built with cane sticks and mud. On the first floor, with vault, within the centre of the tower, there is a ladder with high stairs which will rise over the four levels. In the surrounding area there is a set of Gothic tunnels with diaphragmatic arches that are not open for visitors and are likely to be valued

== International relations ==
=== Twin towns - Sister cities ===
Benifaió is twinned with:

- Valmontone in Latium, Italy

== See also ==
- List of municipalities in Valencia
