= Sant Joanet =

- Municipality
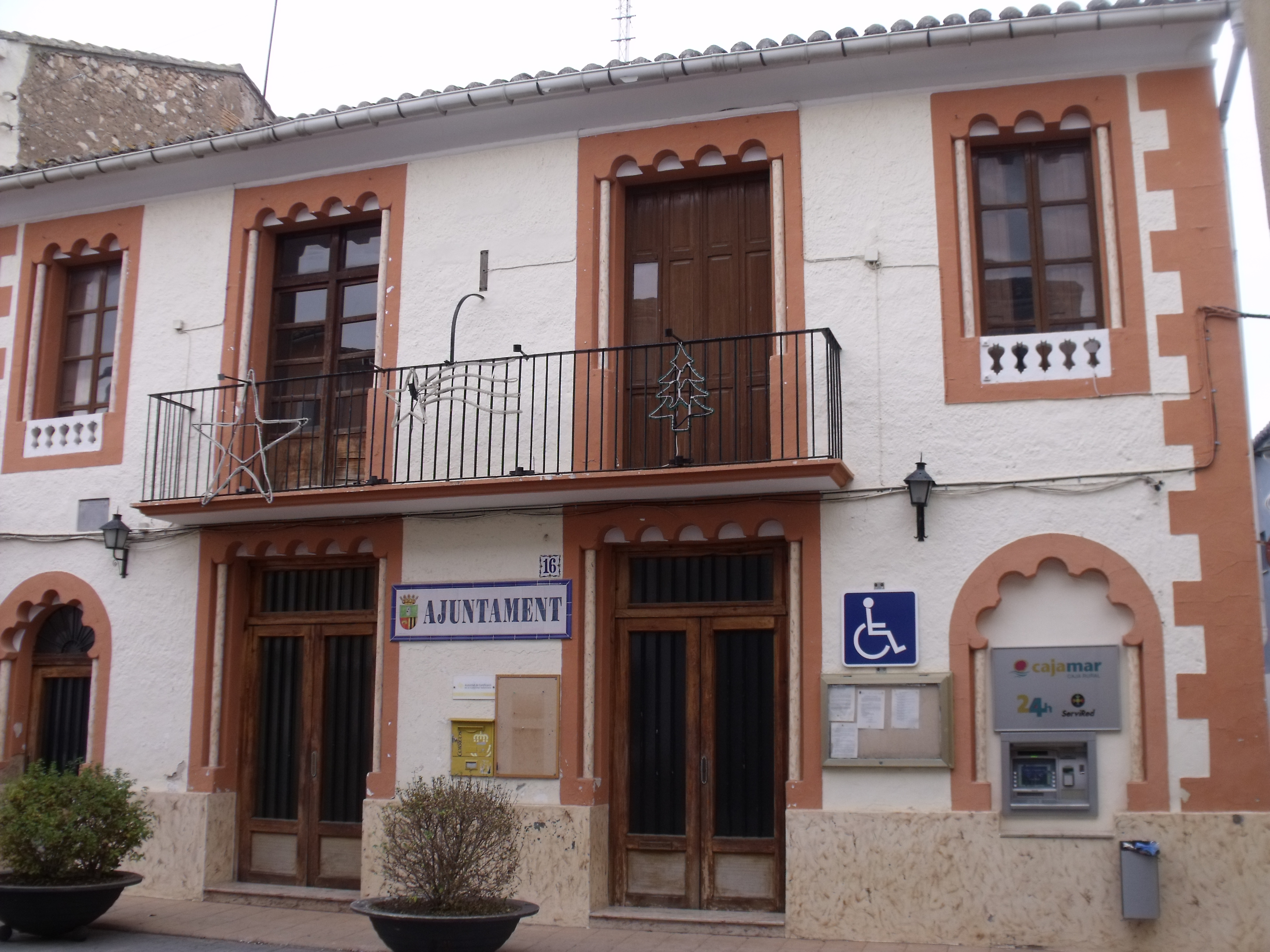
- Town hall

- Coat of arms

- Location in Spain
- Coordinates: 39°4′18″N 0°29′16″W
- Country: Spain
- Autonomous community: Valencian Community
- Province: Valencia
- Comarca: Ribera Alta
- Judicial district: Alzira

Government
  - Alcalde: Evaristo Ribes Prats

Area
  - Total: 1.9 km^{2} (0.73 sq mi)
- Elevation: 30 m (98 ft)

Population (2025-01-01)
  - Total: 527
  - Density: 280/km^{2} (720/sq mi)
- Demonym: Santjoaner/a
- Time zone: UTC+1 (CET)
  - Summer (DST): UTC+2 (CEST)
- Postal code: 46669
- Official language(s): Valencian
- Website: Official website

Sant Joanet (Catalan pronunciation: [ˈsaɲ dʒuaˈnet], Spanish: San Juan de Énova), formerly known as Sant Joan de l'Ènova is a municipality in the comarca of Ribera Alta in the Valencian Community, Spain.

== See also ==
- List of municipalities in Valencia
