= Beneixida =

- Municipality
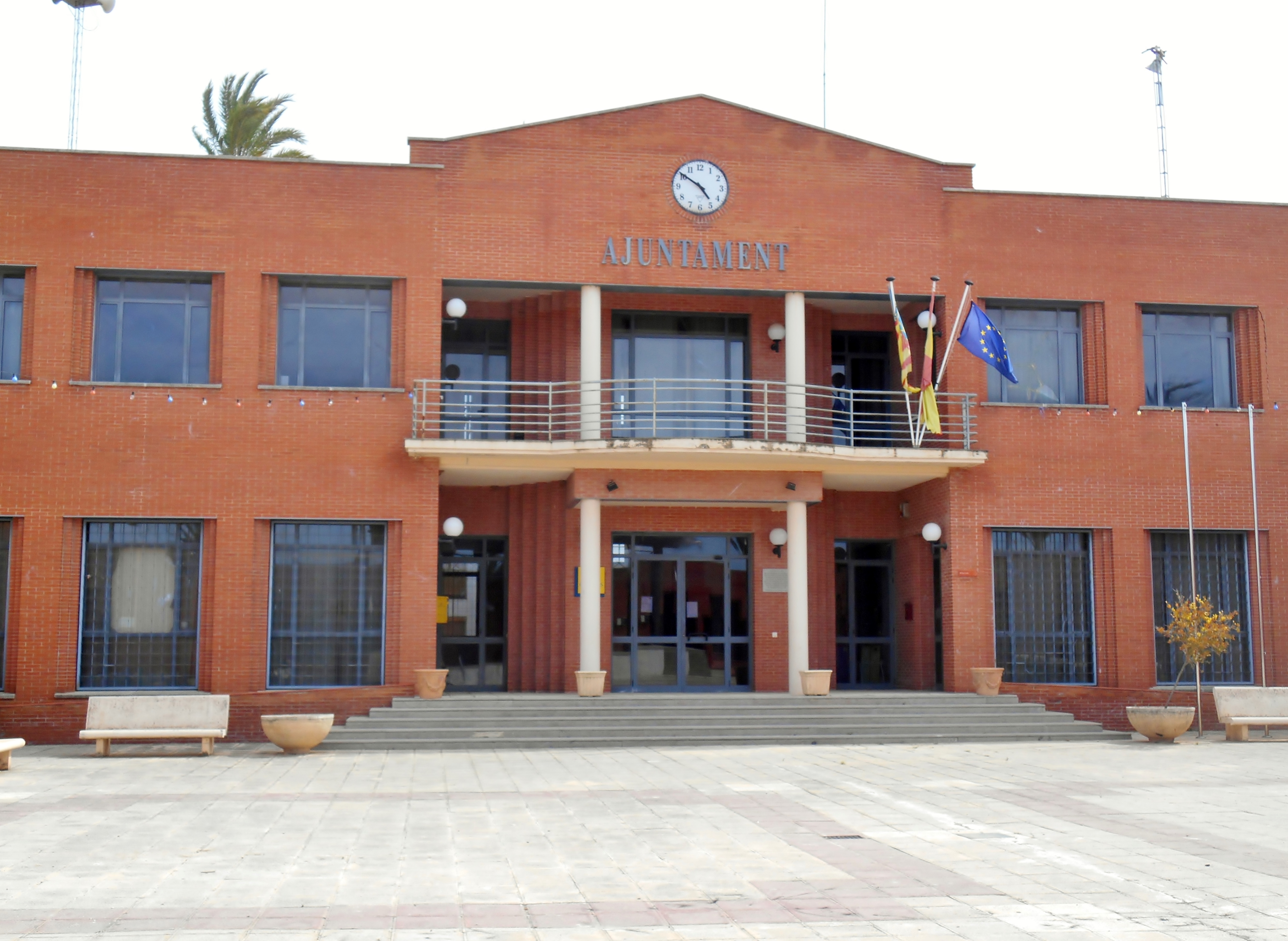
- Town hall

- Flag Coat of arms

- Location in Spain
- Coordinates: 39°4′30″N 0°33′6″W
- Country: Spain
- Autonomous community: Valencian Community
- Province: Valencia
- Comarca: Ribera Alta
- Judicial district: Alzira
- Founded: 1250

Government
  - Alcalde: Eva Roig (PSPV)

Area
  - Total: 3.2 km^{2} (1.2 sq mi)
- Elevation: 35 m (115 ft)

Population (2025-01-01)
  - Total: 659
  - Density: 210/km^{2} (530/sq mi)
- Demonym: Beneixider
- Time zone: UTC+1 (CET)
  - Summer (DST): UTC+2 (CEST)
- Postal code: 46293
- Official language(s): Valencian
- Website: Official website

Beneixida (Spanish: Benegida) is a municipality in the comarca of Ribera Alta in the Valencian Community, Spain.

== See also ==
- List of municipalities in Valencia
