= Ribera Alta (comarca) =

Coordinates: 39.2025°N 0.5424°W

- Comarca
- Country: Spain
- Autonomous community: Valencian Community
- Province: València / Valencia
- Capital and largest city: Alzira
- Municipalities: 35 municipalities: Alberic, Alcàntera de Xúquer, L'Alcúdia, Alfarb, Algemesí, Alginet, Alzira, Antella, Beneixida, Benifaió, Benimodo, Benimuslem, Carcaixent, Càrcer, Carlet, Castelló de la Ribera, Catadau, Cotes, L'Ènova, Gavarda, Guadassuar, Llombai, Manuel, Massalavés, Montroy, Montserrat, La Pobla Llarga, Rafelguaraf, Real, Sallent de Xàtiva, San Juan de Énova, Senyera, Sumacàrcer, Tous, Turís

Area
  - Total: 951.56 km^{2} (367.40 sq mi)

Population (2006)
  - Total: 220.336
  - Density: 0.23155/km^{2} (0.59972/sq mi)
- Time zone: UTC+1 (CET)
  - Summer (DST): UTC+2 (CEST)

Ribera Alta (Valencian: [riˈbeɾa ˈalta]; Spanish: [riˈβeɾa ˈalta]) is a comarca (county) in the province of Valencia, Valencian Community, Spain. The capital and largest city is Alzira.

== Origin ==
The Xúquer, the largest river of the Valencian Community, is a characteristic of the Ribera Alta, bringing water from the basin to fertilise this plain, situated to the south of the Valencia. The economy of this predominantly agricultural region is based primarily upon the orange harvest, a crop which has been cultivated since the 18th century. From its rich historical heritage, some noteworthy region’s features are the towns of La Pobla Llarga, Carcaixent and Alzira. These, alongside a rich and varied gastronomy and an extensive festival calendar, make this region, which is still virtually untouched by tourists, an attractive area to visit.

== Municipalities ==
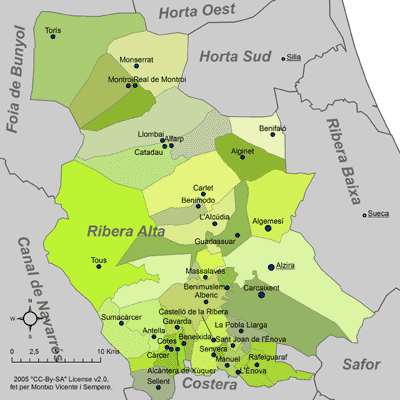
Municipalities of Ribera Alta

- Alberic
- Alcàntera de Xúquer
- L'Alcúdia
- Alfarb
- Algemesí
- Alginet
- Alzira
- Antella
- Beneixida
- Benifaió
- Benimodo
- Benimuslem
- Carcaixent
- Càrcer
- Carlet
- Castelló de la Ribera
- Catadau
- Cotes
- L'Ènova
- Gavarda
- Guadassuar
- Llombai
- Manuel
- Massalavés
- Montroy
- Montserrat
- La Pobla Llarga
- Rafelguaraf
- Real
- Sallent de Xàtiva
- Sant Joanet
- Senyera
- Sumacàrcer
- Tous
- Turís

== Gastronomy and events ==
The gastronomy of the Ribera Alta is, like the rest of Valencia, known for rice dishes. Here the specialties include the foods such as dry rice dishes and stews cooked on an open fire or in the heat of clay ovens. Dishes such as all ipebre (potatoes and eels), espardenyà (potatoes, eels, rabbit and eggs), as well as Valencian paella, are part of local cuisine which can be tasted in the many bars and restaurants of the region. The desserts consist a range of sweetbreads and cakes, which include arnadí de carabassa, pastissets de moniato, panquemados from Alberic or fougasses, made of sugar and flour, not to mention honey from Montroy, all to be taken with the Moscatel and Malvazia wines from Montserrat and Turis. The Ribera Alta is a region with annual fiestas, with annual fiestas taking place in each and every one of the villages and towns, the popular religious festivities and celebrations held in the summer months. Some of the fiestas are the Falles of Saint Joseph, where statues are erected and then burnt in many villages in the middle of March, les Danses de Guadassuar, held in the last week of August, the festivals of Mare de déu delLluch in the village of Alzira and Mare de Déu d’Aigües Vives in the village of Carcaixent, or the festival of Mare de Déu de la Salut in the village of Algemesí on September, and which has taken place for over 800 years. La Mare de Déu de la Salut Festival takes place in the historical parts of the city of Algemesí on 7 and 8 September each year.

Here the music of the dolçaina i tabalet, a type of flute, accompanies the traditional dances of la carxofa, elsarquets, les pastoretes and the popular la Muixeranga. These festivals have been officially declared of tourist interest and precede the Semana de Bous (Week of the Bulls), which takes place in the interesting bullring, which unusually, is rectangular-shaped.

== Orange cultivation ==
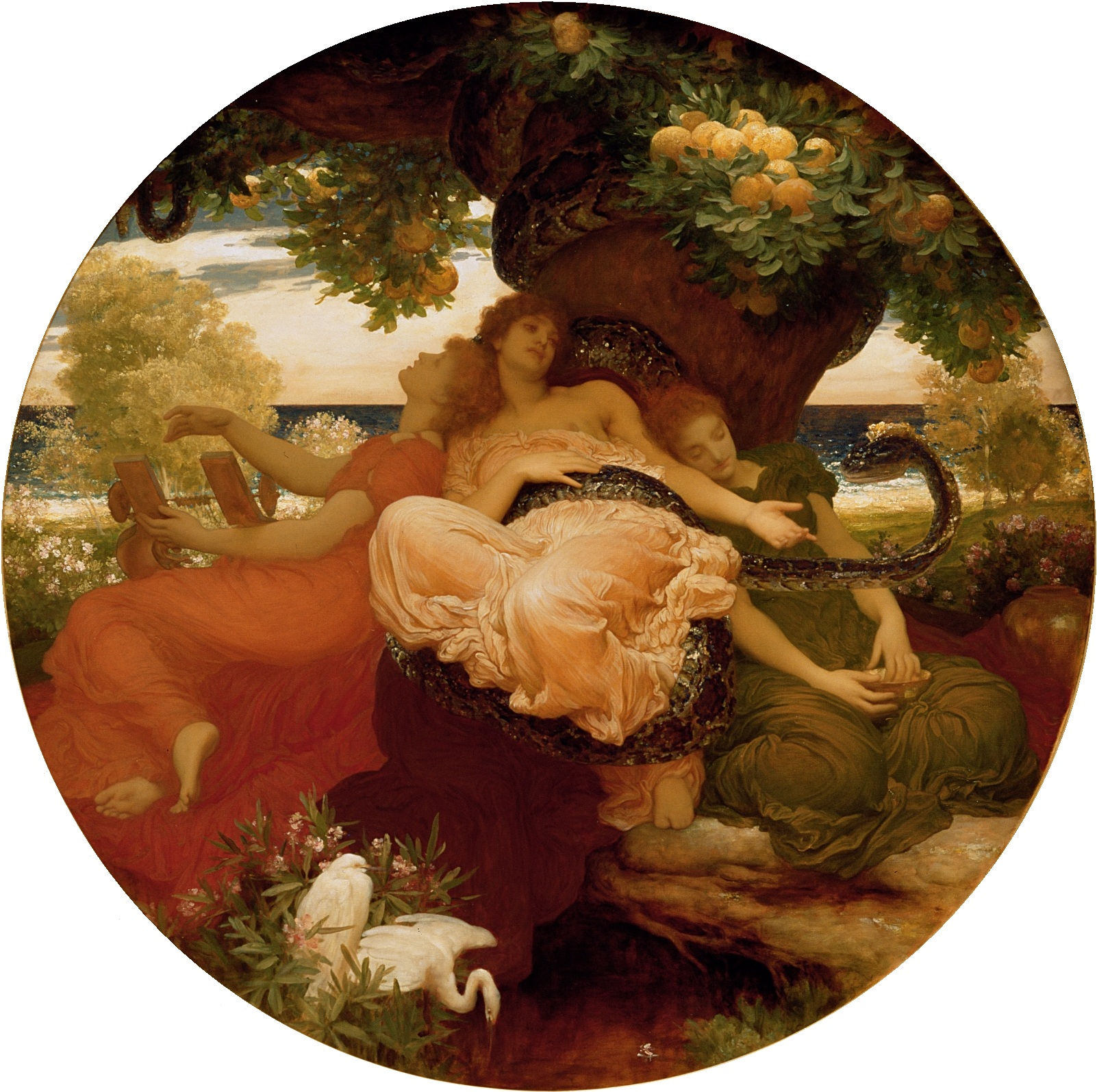
The Garden of the Hesperides by Frederick, Lord Leighton, 1892.

The orange is the fruit of the plant species Citrus × sinensis or C. × aurantium, trees that first appeared in China and other southern areas of the Asian continent. The fruit made its way from the Far East to the European continent, reaching Spain, through Valencia, and spreading throughout the rest of the world. In Greek mythology the Garden of the Hesperides is a mythological grove where apples grew tended to by nymphs and a dragon. Hercules, the hero of classical literature, killed the guardian, entered the garden and plucked those golden apples –In later years it was thought that the "golden apples" might have actually been oranges, a fruit unknown to Europe before the Middle Ages. Several scholars defend that the etymology of the word comes from the Sanskrit term narang and the Persian word narensh. When Arabs brought orange farming to the Iberian Peninsula, they called the fruits naranjah. The Region of Valencia maintained the orange-farming tradition after the Arabic period, with references to orange trees in the city of Valencia dating back to the 14th century. In fact, there is an Orange Courtyard inside Valencia’s 15th century Silk Exchange market (La Llotja de la Seda), a UNESCO World Heritage Site. The first references to commercial orange plantations date back to the 18th century. At present, there are approximately 150,000 hectares of orange groves in the Valencian Community producing orange and mandarin varieties including satsumas, clementines, navel oranges, common oranges, blood oranges, and hybrids, as the most important specimens.

Ribera Alta has a long orange farming tradition. The economy and population boomed in the area in the 18th century, and Ribera Alta profited from an expansion that also affected a sector as important as agriculture. Orange farming was introduced in this context. According to the historical records, in 1781 priest Vicente Monzó, notary Maseres and pharmacist Bodí, planted the first fields of orange trees in Carcaixent. The trees thrived in the land, favoured by the benign Mediterranean climate, and adapted perfectly to Valencian soil both on rain-fed farmland and irrigated land fed by river Xúquer, whose extensive irrigation channel distributed fertile water around the whole of the Ribera Altaarea. In the early 19th century, orange trees gradually started to replace other crops, such as rice, cereal and mulberries, taking over as the main local crop. Wholesale exports of oranges commenced in this century, fuelled by the arrival of the railway.
