= Real, Spain =

Real Real de Montroi
- Municipality
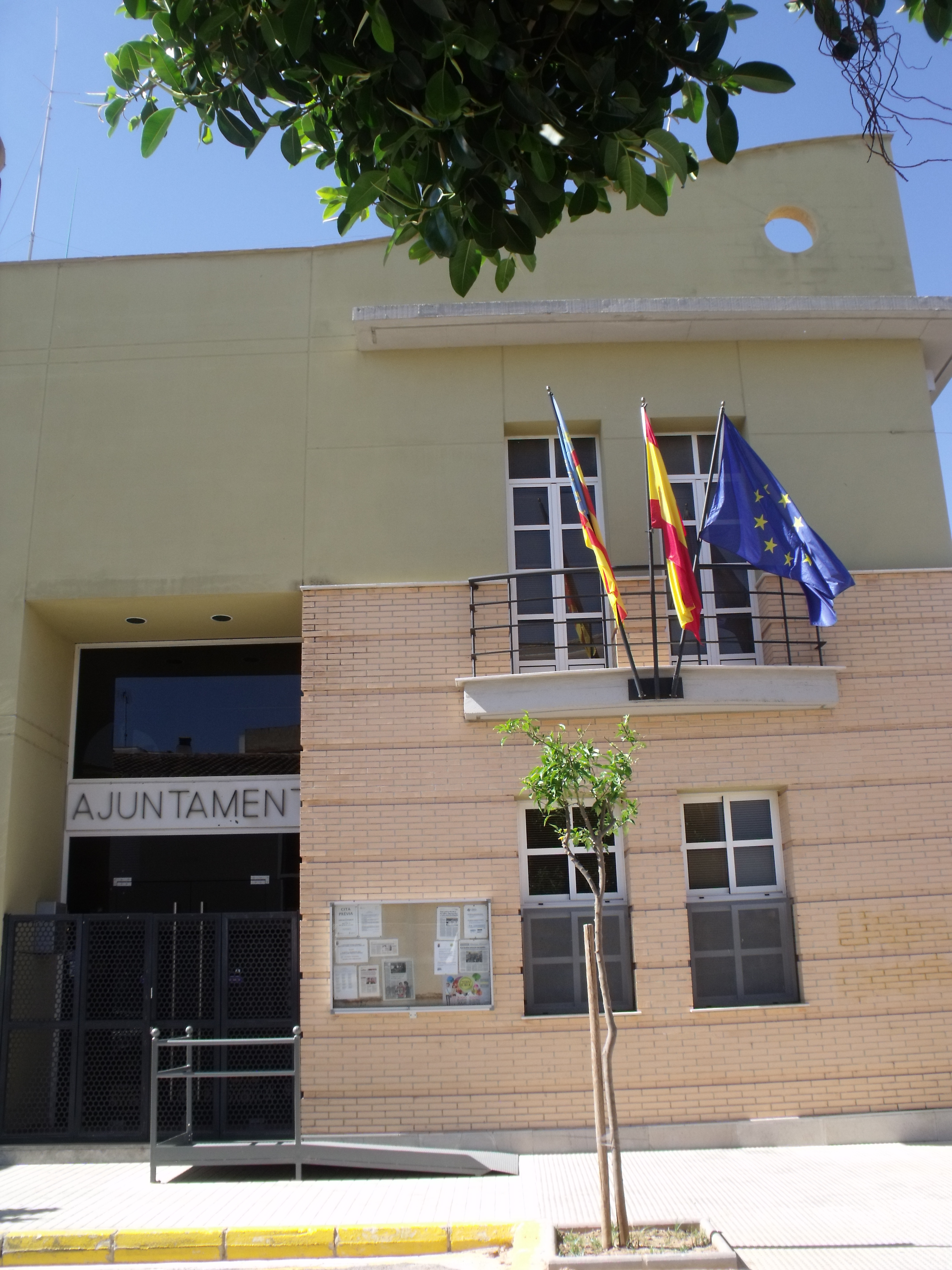
- Town hall

- Coat of arms

- Location in Spain
- Coordinates: 39°20′9″N 0°36′34″W
- Country: Spain
- Autonomous community: Valencian Community
- Province: Valencia
- Comarca: Ribera Alta
- Judicial district: Picassent

Government
  - Alcalde: María Dolores López Garrigós

Area
  - Total: 18.3 km^{2} (7.1 sq mi)
- Elevation: 135 m (443 ft)

Population (2025-01-01)
  - Total: 2,497
  - Density: 136/km^{2} (353/sq mi)
- Demonym(s): Realer, realera
- Time zone: UTC+1 (CET)
  - Summer (DST): UTC+2 (CEST)
- Postal code: 46194
- Official language(s): Valencian
- Website: Official website

Real (traditionally known as Real de Montroi) is a municipality in the comarca of Ribera Alta in the Valencian Community, Spain.

== See also ==
- List of municipalities in Valencia
