= Benimuslem =

- Municipality
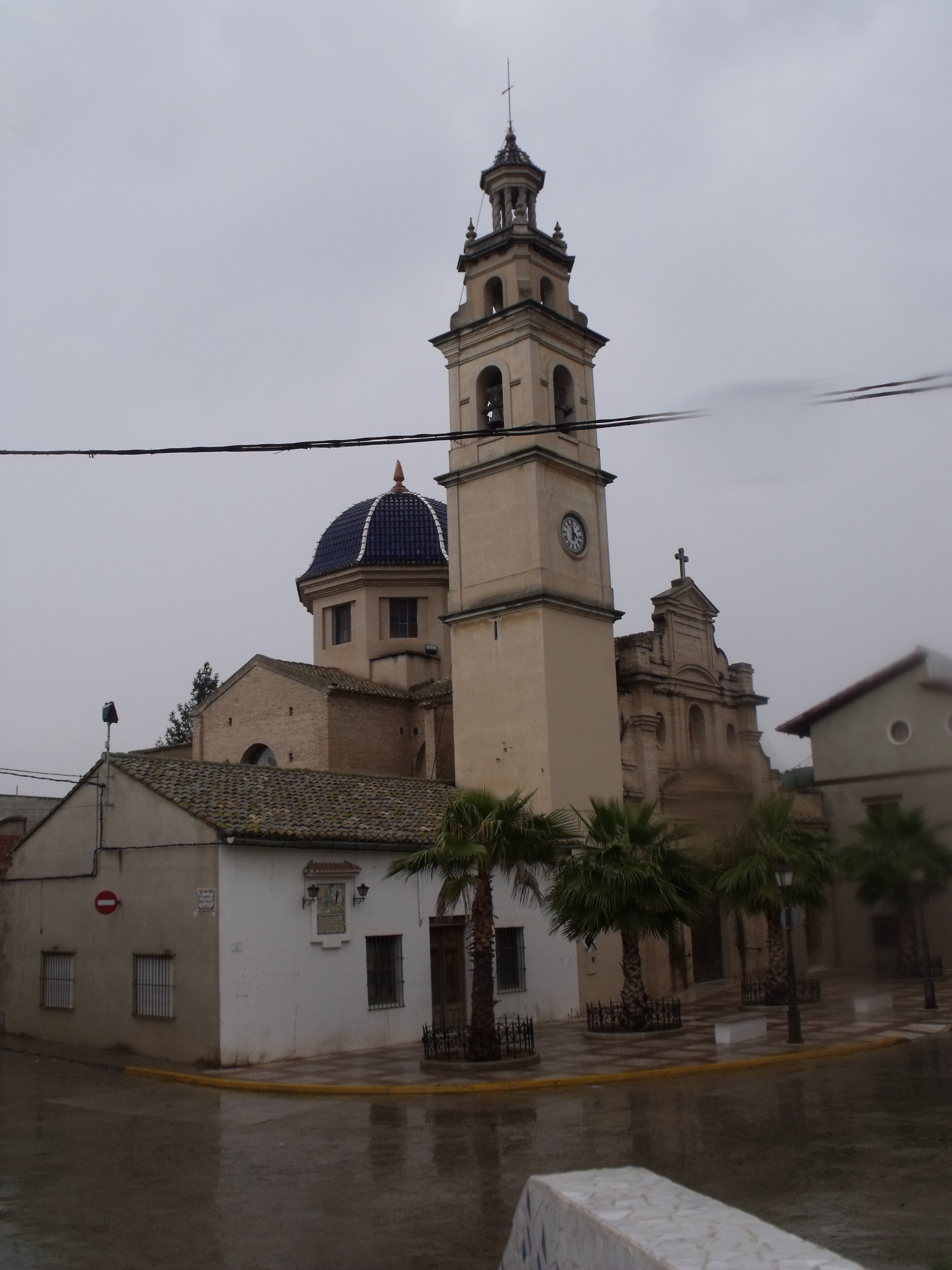

- Coat of arms

- Location in Spain
- Coordinates: 39°7′50″N 0°29′36″W
- Country: Spain
- Autonomous community: Valencian Community
- Province: Valencia
- Comarca: Ribera Alta
- Judicial district: Alzira

Government
  - Alcalde: Tomás Rivera Mancebo

Area
  - Total: 4.20 km^{2} (1.62 sq mi)
- Elevation: 44 m (144 ft)

Population (2025-01-01)
  - Total: 674
  - Density: 160/km^{2} (416/sq mi)
- Demonym(s): Benimusler, benimuslera
- Time zone: UTC+1 (CET)
  - Summer (DST): UTC+2 (CEST)
- Postal code: 46611
- Official language(s): Valencian
- Website: Official website

Benimuslem (Valencian pronunciation: [benimuzˈlɛm]) is a municipality in the comarca of Ribera Alta in the Valencian Community, Spain.

== See also ==
- List of municipalities in Valencia
