= Massalavés =

- Municipality
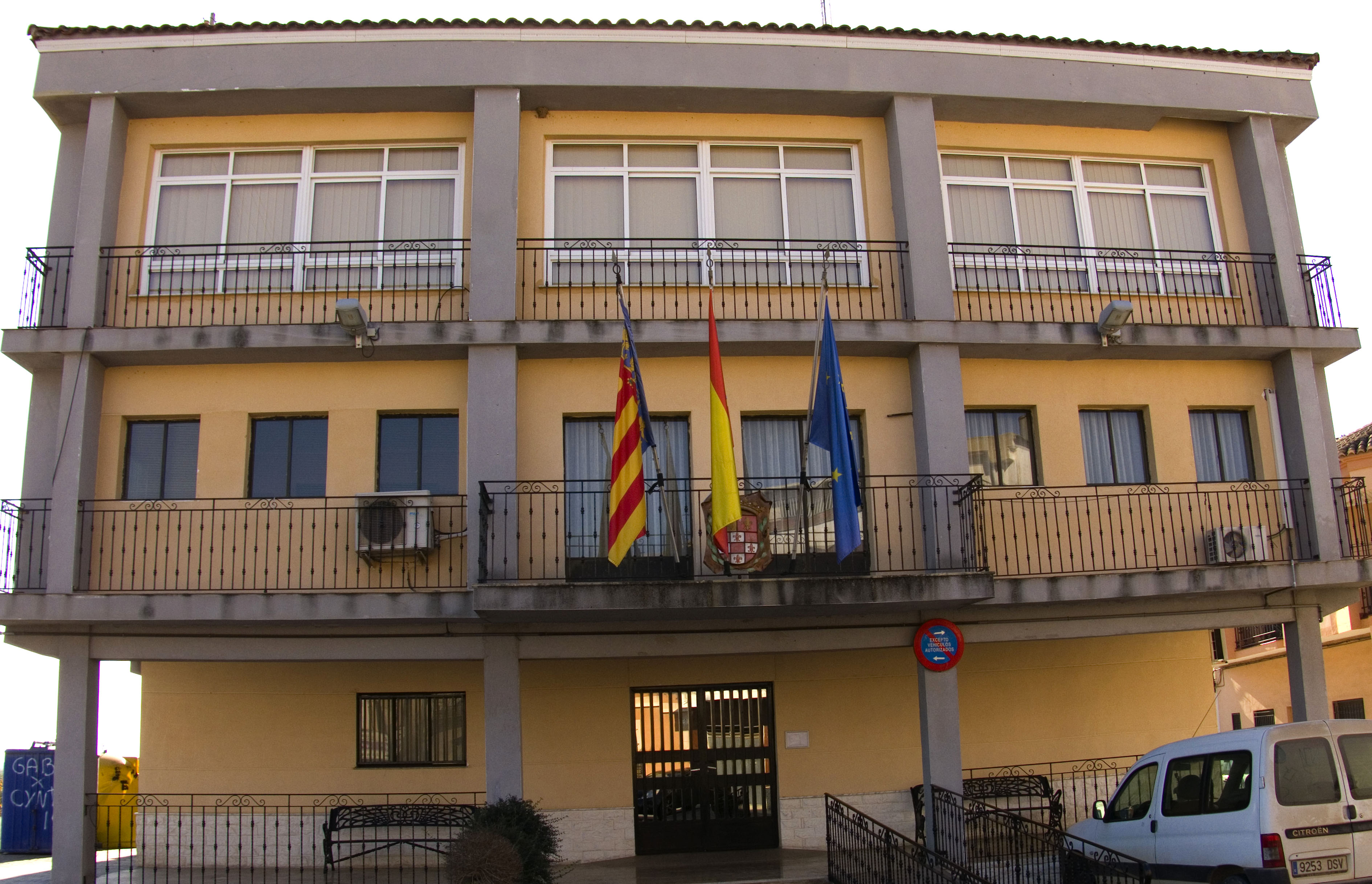
- Town hall

- Coat of arms

- Location in Spain
- Coordinates: 39°8′30″N 0°31′16″W
- Country: Spain
- Autonomous community: Valencian Community
- Province: Valencia
- Comarca: Ribera Alta
- Judicial district: Alzira

Government
  - Alcalde: Enrique Domenech

Area
  - Total: 7.5 km^{2} (2.9 sq mi)
- Elevation: 28 m (92 ft)

Population (2025-01-01)
  - Total: 1,905
  - Density: 250/km^{2} (660/sq mi)
- Demonym(s): Massalavesí/ina; Masalavesense/a
- Time zone: UTC+1 (CET)
  - Summer (DST): UTC+2 (CEST)
- Postal code: 46292
- Official language(s): Valencian
- Website: Official website

Massalavés (previously known as Masalavés) is a municipality in the comarca of Ribera Alta in the autonomous Valencian Community, Spain.

== See also ==
- List of municipalities in Valencia
