= La Pobla Llarga =

- Municipality
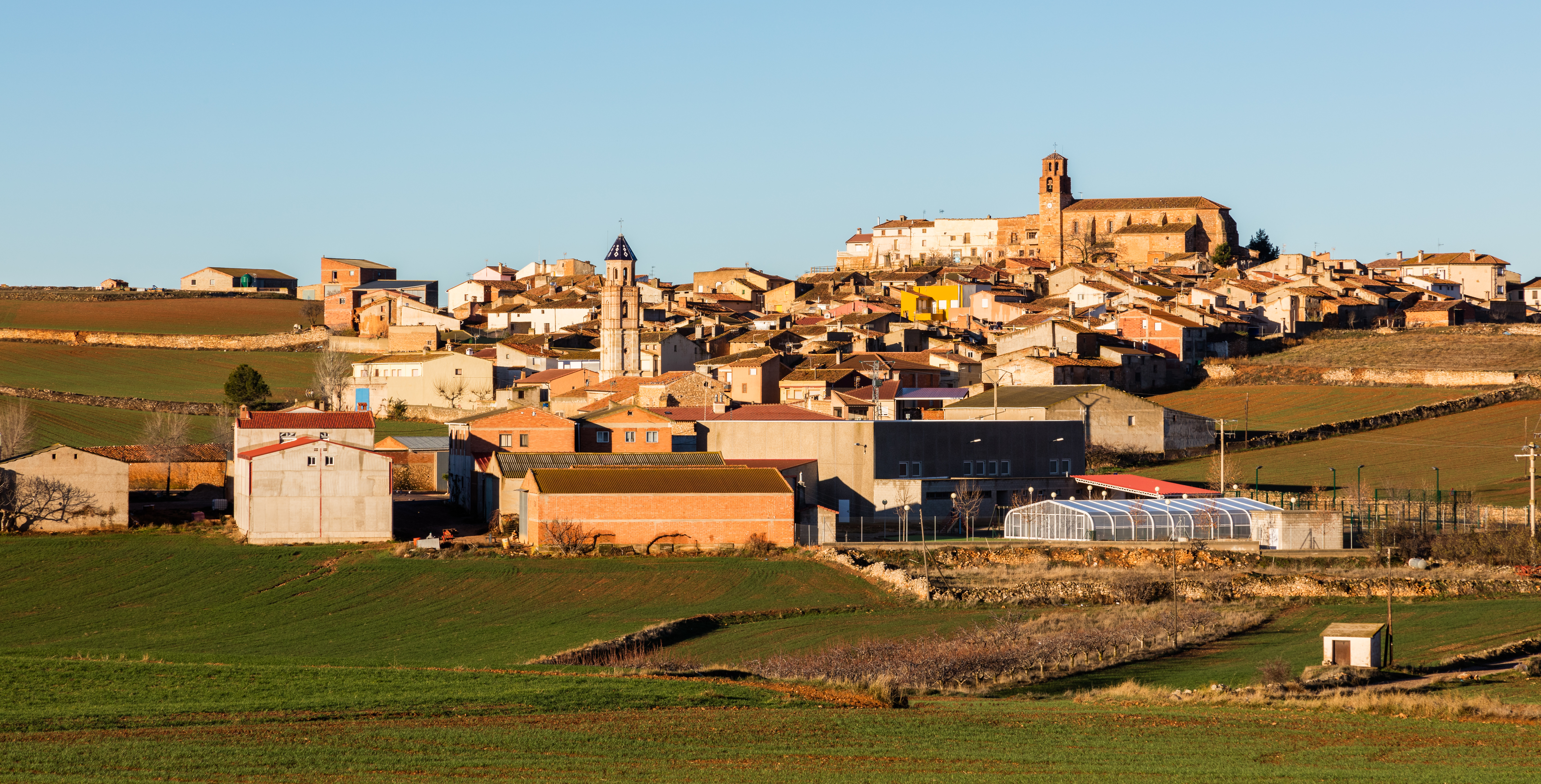

- Coat of arms

- Location in Spain
- Coordinates: 39°5′10″N 0°28′36″W
- Country: Spain
- Autonomous community: Valencian Community
- Province: Valencia
- Comarca: Ribera Alta
- Judicial district: Alzira

Government
  - Alcalde: Neus Garrigues Calatayud

Area
  - Total: 10.1 km^{2} (3.9 sq mi)
- Elevation: 30 m (98 ft)

Population (2025-01-01)
  - Total: 4,665
  - Density: 462/km^{2} (1,200/sq mi)
- Demonym(s): Poblatà, poblatana
- Time zone: UTC+1 (CET)
  - Summer (DST): UTC+2 (CEST)
- Postal code: 46670
- Official language(s): Valencian
- Website: Official website

La Pobla Llarga (Valencian pronunciation: [la ˈpɔbla ˈʎaɾɣa]; Spanish: Puebla Larga [ˈpweβla ˈlaɾɣa]) is a municipality in the comarca of Ribera Alta in the Valencian Community, Spain. Well known of the orange growth and its flourishing commerce in the 19th and 20th centuries. Currently, its inhabitants live basically on agriculture and the service sector.

== Economy ==
=== Transport ===
Public transport is provided by the Ferrocarrils de la Generalitat Valenciana (FGV). Is well connected by Cercanías Valencia, the commuter rail service that serves Valencia, Spain and its metropolitan area. It is operated by Cercanías Renfe, the commuter rail division of Renfe, the former monopoly of rail services in Spain. The network is owned by Adif, the national railway infrastructure company. La Pobla Llarga Railway Station utilises the radial line C-2. to/from the city centre. From The North station (Valencia) it's the eight parade after Alfafar-Benetusser station, Catarroja station, Silla station, Benifaió-Almussafes station, Algemesí station, Alzira station, Carcaixent station and finally La Pobla Llarga station. Train service from the village to Valencia is every 20 minutes

The village is well connected by car. The easiest way to reach La Pobla Llarga from the city of Valencia through the A-7 and then CV-564

== Infrastructure ==
=== Education ===
With a population near 4.500, Pobla Llaga has a public school's Doctor Sanchis Guarner, Pere d' Esplugues High School and Colegio Santa Ana, a mixed private school which teaches as the presence of various languages (English, Catalan and Spanish). The village also has a music school (Unió Musical La Pobla Llarga)

=== Hospitals ===
The village has the Centre de salut La pobla Llarga (Medical Center) and is near of Alzira Hospital and Hospital Lluís Alcanyís de Xàtiva

== Demographics ==
1990	1992	1994	1996	1998	2000	2002	2004	2005	2006	2007	2010
4.537	4.376	4.463	4.390	4.339	4.373	4.372	4.473	4.451	4.379	4.420	4.754

== Monuments ==
- Antigua Alquería y necrópolis. Dating to the Arabic times
- Cruz del Término (Creu de Terme), gotical style 13th century
- Pont de l’Ase
- Ayuntamiento, 14th century.
- Iglesia Parroquial.
- Casa Miñana
- Casa del Baró de santa Bàrbera
- Plaça de la Mare de Déu dels Desemparats, built by Silvestre d' Edeta,
- Magatzem Ballester built in 1930 has an eclecticism and Modernisme and style
- Cinema Monterrey, built in 1950 by architect Juan Guardiola Martinez (1895-1962), a student of Antoni Gaudí who is best known for designing Barcelona's House Xinesa.
- Mercat, a Modernisme architecture

== Culture ==
Each year the village holds a celebration in honor of San Caxlit and the Moors and Christians. In October 2010 Vincent Pérez opened their holiday festivities.

== Notable people ==
- David Bernabéu, Spanish road bicycle racer.
- David Albelda, Spanish retired footballer. A Spanish international in the 2000s, Albelda gained 51 caps for the country, representing it in two World Cups and at Euro 2004.

== See also ==
- List of municipalities in Valencia
