= Sumacàrcer =

- Municipality
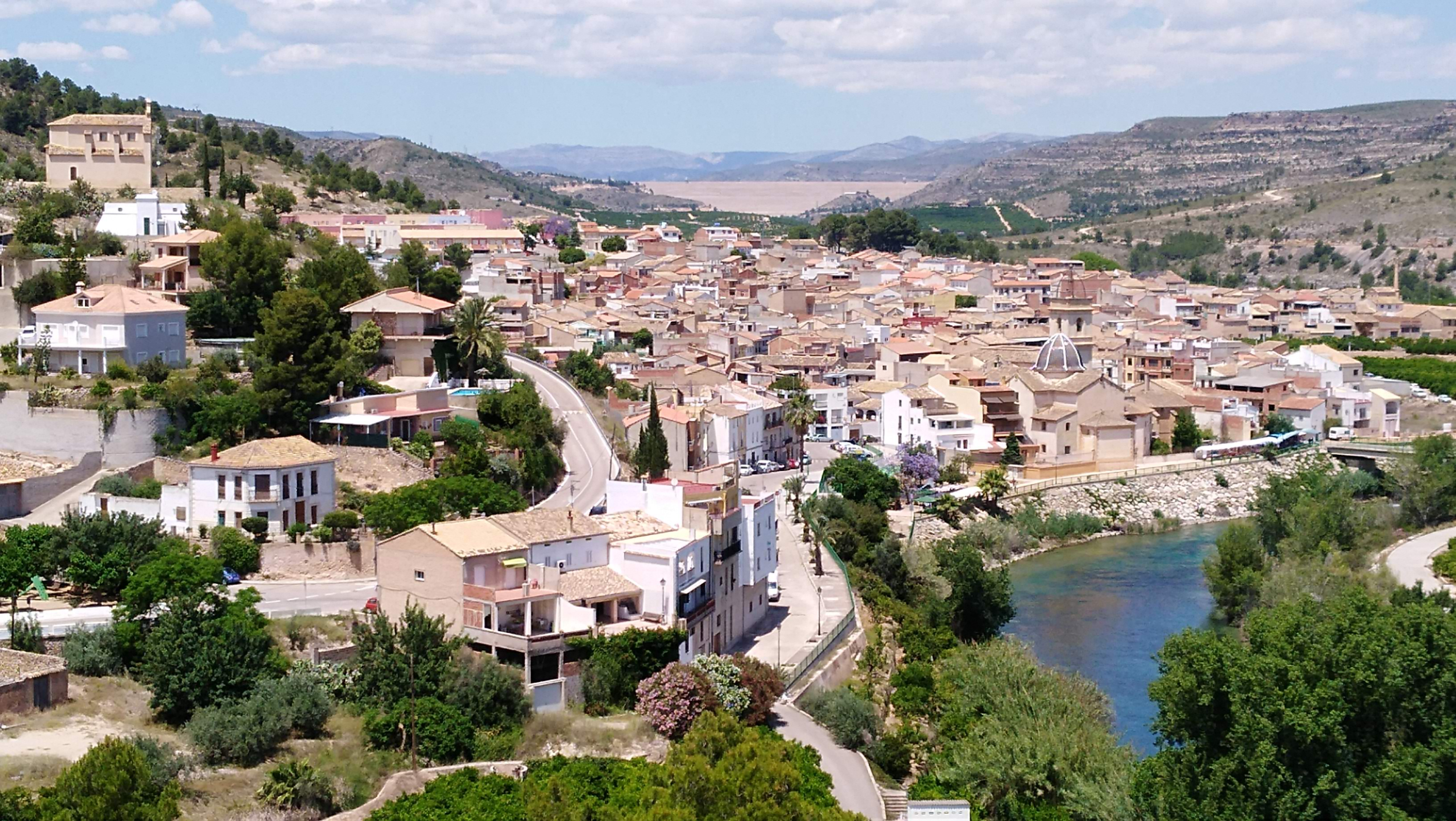
- Sumacàrcer

- Flag Coat of arms

- Location in Spain
- Coordinates: 39°5′50″N 0°37′56″W
- Country: Spain
- Autonomous community: Valencian Community
- Province: Valencia
- Comarca: Ribera Alta
- Judicial district: Alzira

Government
  - Alcalde: Mª Consuelo Pons Pons

Area
  - Total: 20.1 km^{2} (7.8 sq mi)
- Elevation: 45 m (148 ft)

Population (2025-01-01)
  - Total: 1,013
  - Density: 50.4/km^{2} (131/sq mi)
- Demonym(s): Sumacarcerí, sumacarcerina
- Time zone: UTC+1 (CET)
  - Summer (DST): UTC+2 (CEST)
- Postal code: 46295
- Official language(s): Valencian
- Website: Official website

Sumacàrcer (Spanish: Sumacárcel) is a municipality in the comarca of Ribera Alta in the Valencian Community, Spain.

== Main sights ==
- Palace of los condes de Orgaz: Construction dated in the end of the Middle Ages (15th century), represents the typical rural palace of the Valencian nobility. Originally, this palace belonged to the period when the town belonged to the Orgaz lordship, where some of the members of this lineage were born and lived. The architectural features which form it: a square with a central courtyard, patio with Carpantic arches from the 15th century, remains of the old town and door of entrance from the Renaissance.

== See also ==
- List of municipalities in Valencia
