= Alcàntera de Xúquer =

- Municipality
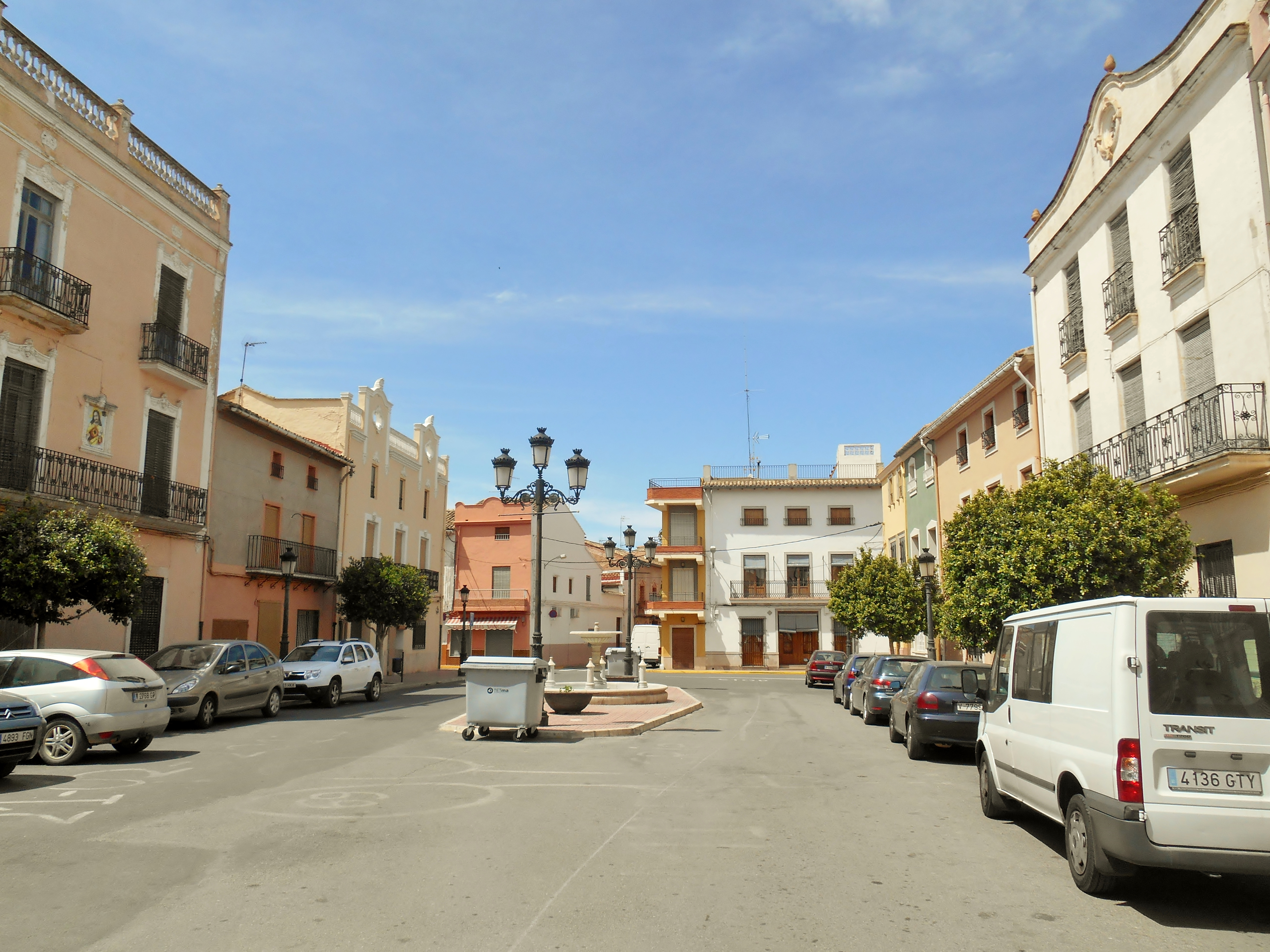

- Coat of arms

- Location in Spain
- Coordinates: 39°4′10″N 0°33′36″W
- Country: Spain
- Autonomous community: Valencian Community
- Province: Valencia
- Comarca: Ribera Alta
- Judicial district: Alzira

Government
  - Alcaldesa: Teresa Nieves Perucho Blasco (2007) (PSOE)

Area
  - Total: 3.3 km^{2} (1.3 sq mi)
- Elevation: 33 m (108 ft)

Population (2025-01-01)
  - Total: 1,468
  - Density: 440/km^{2} (1,200/sq mi)
- Demonyms: Alcanterí, alcanterina
- Time zone: UTC+1 (CET)
  - Summer (DST): UTC+2 (CEST)
- Postal code: 46293
- Official language(s): Valencian
- Website: Official website

Alcàntera de Xúquer is a municipality in the comarca of Ribera Alta in the Valencian Community, Spain.

== See also ==
- List of municipalities in Valencia
