= Gavarda =

- Municipality
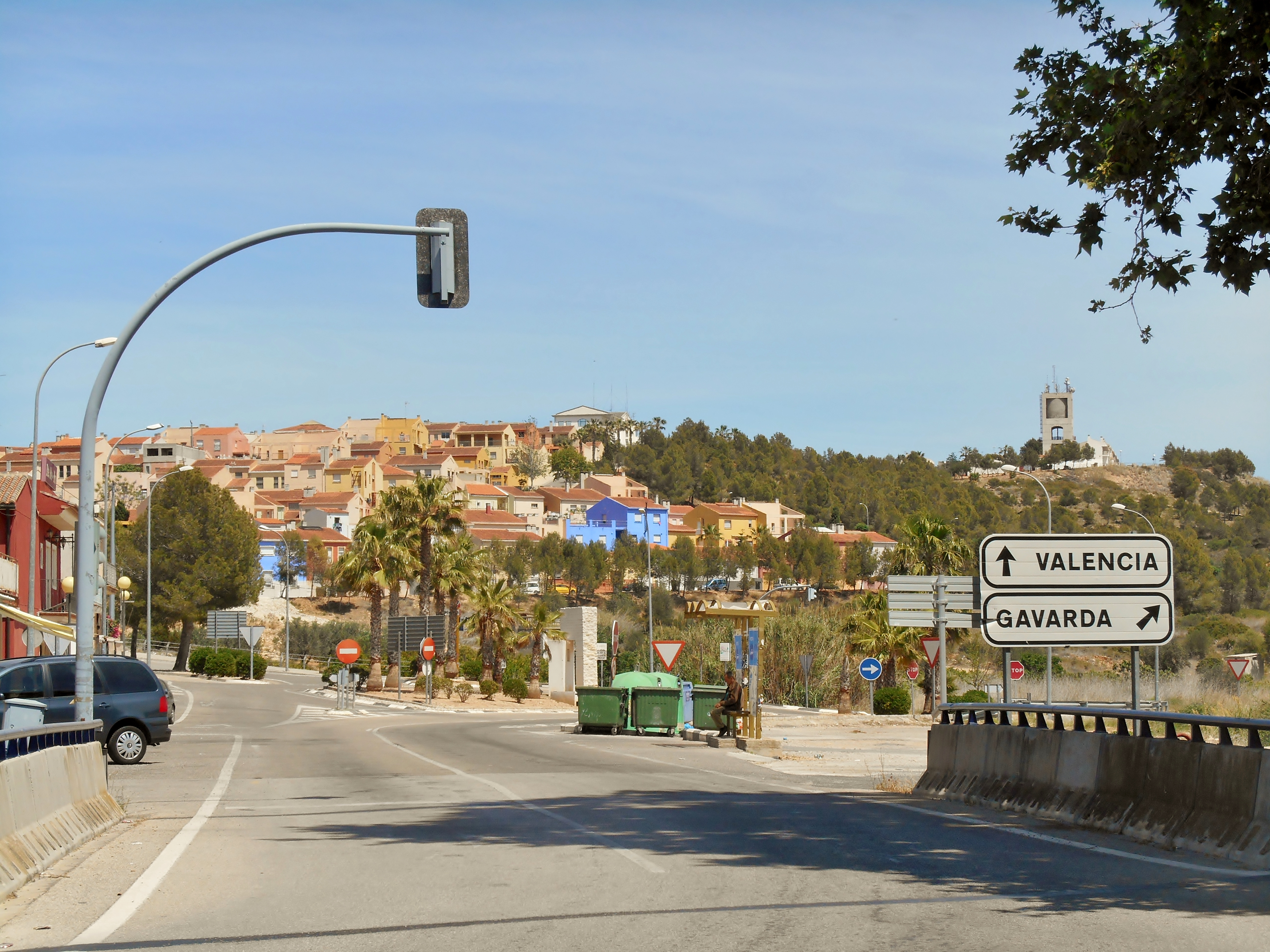

- Coat of arms

- Location in Spain
- Coordinates: 39°5′30″N 0°33′36″W
- Country: Spain
- Autonomous community: Valencian Community
- Province: Valencia
- Comarca: Ribera Alta
- Judicial district: Alzira

Government
  - Alcalde: Adela Martínez Corbí

Area
  - Total: 7.79 km^{2} (3.01 sq mi)
- Elevation: 40 m (130 ft)

Population (2025-01-01)
  - Total: 1,023
  - Density: 131/km^{2} (340/sq mi)
- Demonym: Gabardí/na
- Time zone: UTC+1 (CET)
  - Summer (DST): UTC+2 (CEST)
- Postal code: 46267
- Official language(s): Valencian
- Website: Official website

Gavarda is a municipality in the comarca of Ribera Alta in the Valencian Community, Spain.

== Main sights ==
- Napoleonic battery: The remains of the 18th century fortress are situated in a small promontory on the east side of the new village of Gavarda. The Battery was built in a strategic point since from its position took control over the Júcar River and the road connecting Castilla and Valencia being used during the Independence War. The latest archeological studies show its use as a Fort.

== See also ==
- List of municipalities in Valencia
