= Montroi =

- Municipality
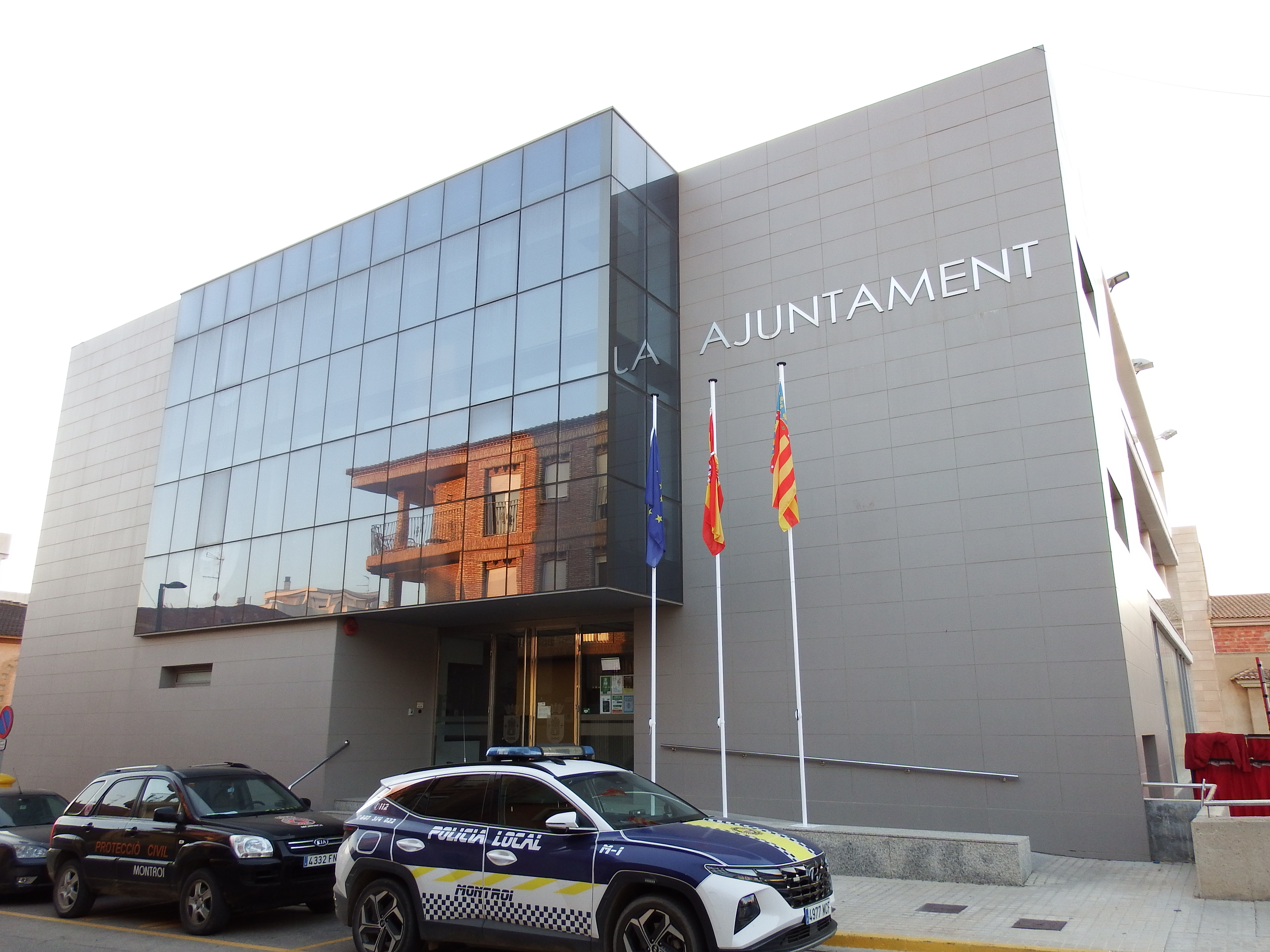
- Town hall

- Coat of arms

- Location in Spain
- Coordinates: 39°20′22″N 0°36′50″W
- Country: Spain
- Autonomous community: Valencian Community
- Province: Valencia
- Comarca: Ribera Alta
- Judicial district: Picassent

Government
  - Alcalde: Jose Antonio Polo Besó

Area
  - Total: 31.4 km^{2} (12.1 sq mi)
- Elevation: 145 m (476 ft)

Population (2025-01-01)
  - Total: 3,792
  - Density: 121/km^{2} (313/sq mi)
- Demonym(s): Montroià, montroiana
- Time zone: UTC+1 (CET)
  - Summer (DST): UTC+2 (CEST)
- Postal code: 46193
- Official language(s): Valencian
- Website: Official website

Montroi (Valencian pronunciation: [monˈtɾɔj], Spanish: Montroy) is a municipality in the comarca of Ribera Alta in the Valencian Community, Spain.

== Cultural event ==
- FIVAMEL: “The Valencian Honey Fair” organized by the city council and with the collaboration of industrialist of this area is held in mid November.

== See also ==
- List of municipalities in Valencia
