= Llombai =

- Municipality
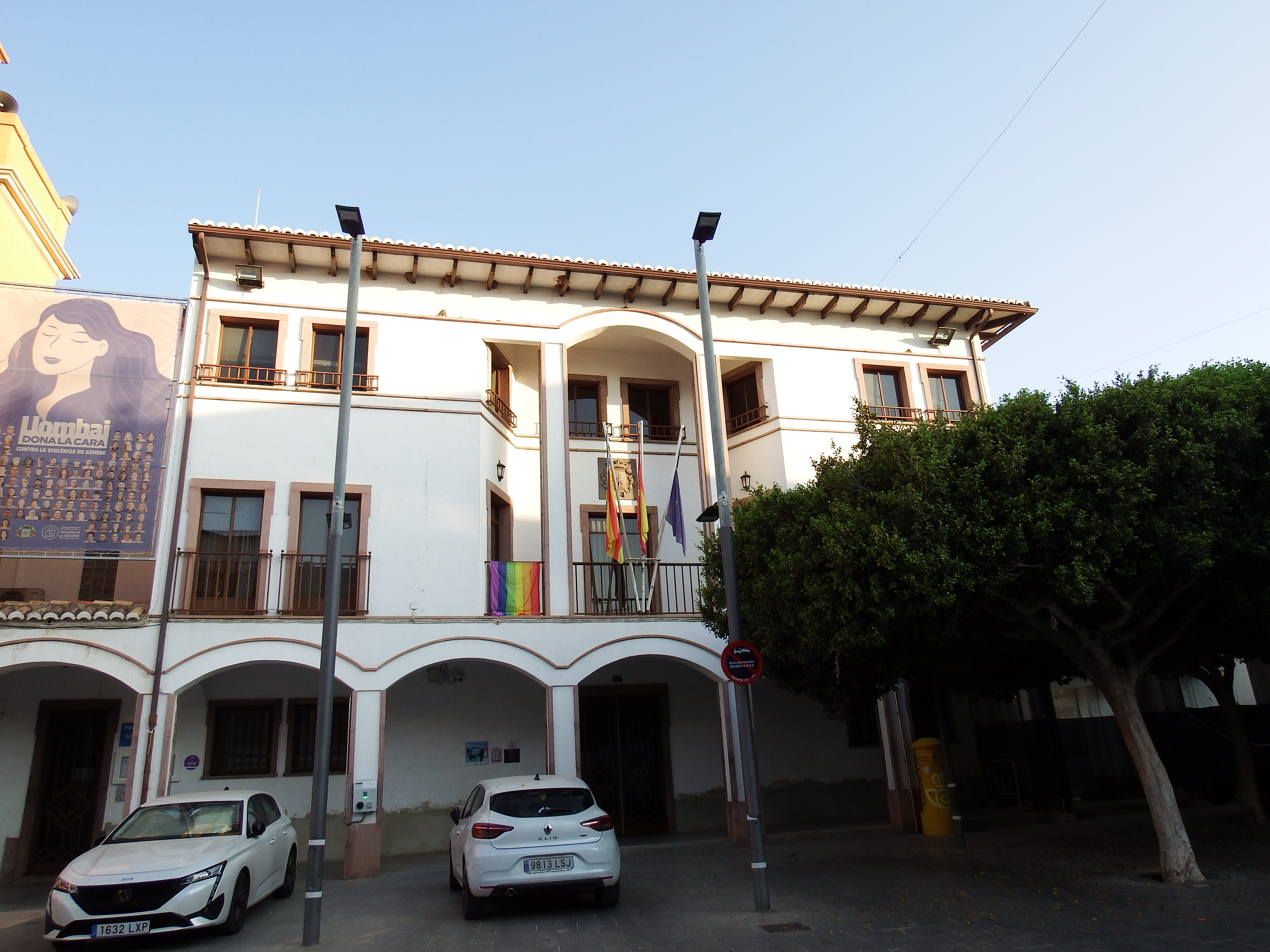
- Town hall

- Coat of arms

- Location in Spain Llombai (Valencian Community) Llombai (Spain)
- Coordinates: 39°16′53″N 0°34′19″W
- Country: Spain
- Autonomous community: Valencian Community
- Province: Valencia
- Comarca: Ribera Alta
- Judicial district: Picassent

Government
  - Alcalde: David Cervera Sanz

Area
  - Total: 55.6 km^{2} (21.5 sq mi)
- Elevation: 100 m (330 ft)

Population (2025-01-01)
  - Total: 2,791
  - Density: 50.2/km^{2} (130/sq mi)
- Demonym: Llombaíno/a
- Time zone: UTC+1 (CET)
  - Summer (DST): UTC+2 (CEST)
- Postal code: 46195
- Official language(s): Valencian
- Website: Official website

Llombai is a municipality in the comarca of Ribera Alta in the Valencian Community, Spain. It is a village of the Marquesat.

== See also ==
- List of municipalities in Valencia
