= Sellent =

- Municipality
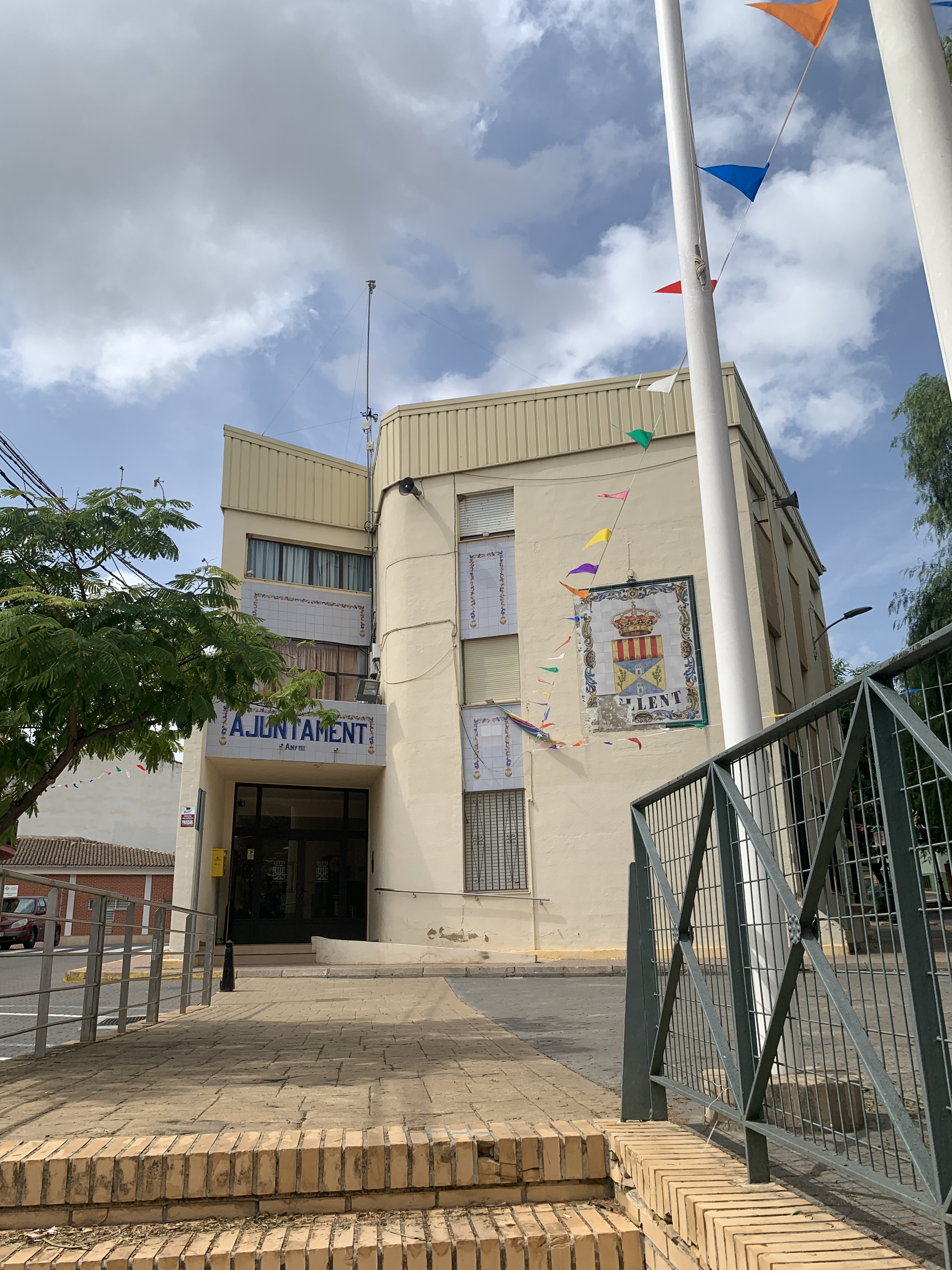
- Town hall

- Coat of arms

- Location in Spain
- Coordinates: 39°1′52″N 0°35′11″W
- Country: Spain
- Autonomous community: Valencian Community
- Province: Valencia
- Comarca: Ribera Alta
- Judicial district: Alzira

Government
  - Alcalde: Jorge Penalba Sancho

Area
  - Total: 14 km^{2} (5.4 sq mi)
- Elevation: 80 m (260 ft)

Population (2025-01-01)
  - Total: 383
  - Density: 27/km^{2} (71/sq mi)
- Demonym: Sellentino/a
- Time zone: UTC+1 (CET)
  - Summer (DST): UTC+2 (CEST)
- Postal code: 46295
- Official language(s): Valencian

Sellent (Valencian: Sallent de Xàtiva, Spanish: Sellent) is a municipality in the comarca of Ribera Alta in the Valencian Community, Spain.

== See also ==
- List of municipalities in Valencia
