= Catadau =

- Municipality
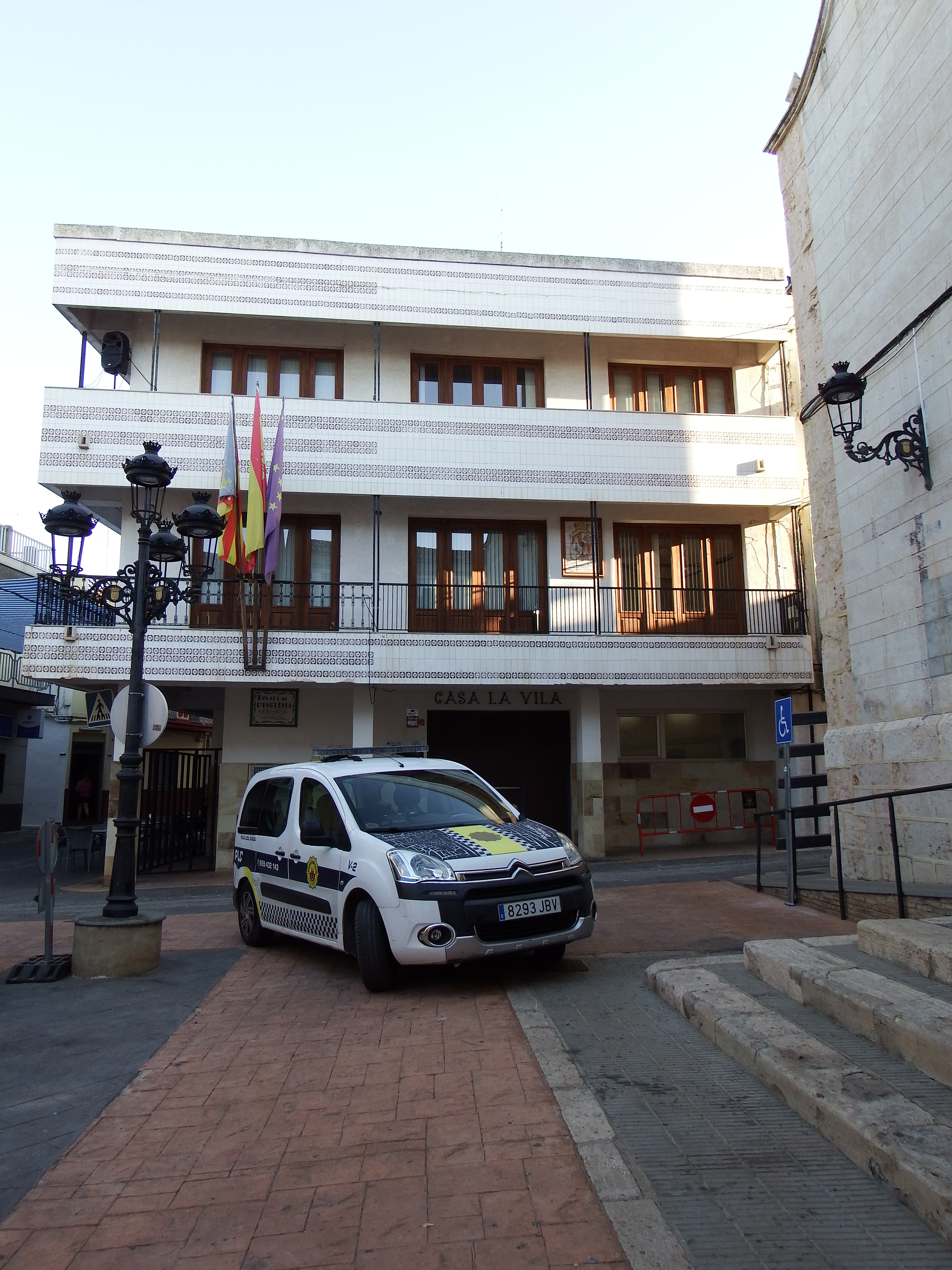
- Town hall

- Coat of arms

- Location in Spain
- Coordinates: 39°16′33″N 0°34′11″W
- Country: Spain
- Autonomous community: Valencian Community
- Province: Valencia
- Comarca: Ribera Alta
- Judicial district: Picassent

Government
  - Alcalde: Rafael Pellicer Esteve

Area
  - Total: 35.5 km^{2} (13.7 sq mi)
- Elevation: 94 m (308 ft)

Population (2025-01-01)
  - Total: 3,005
  - Density: 84.6/km^{2} (219/sq mi)
- Demonym: Catadauino/a
- Time zone: UTC+1 (CET)
  - Summer (DST): UTC+2 (CEST)
- Postal code: 46196
- Official language(s): Valencian
- Website: Official website

Catadau is a municipality in the comarca of Ribera Alta in the Valencian Community, Spain.

== See also ==
- List of municipalities in Valencia
