= Manuel, Spain =

Manuel
- Municipality
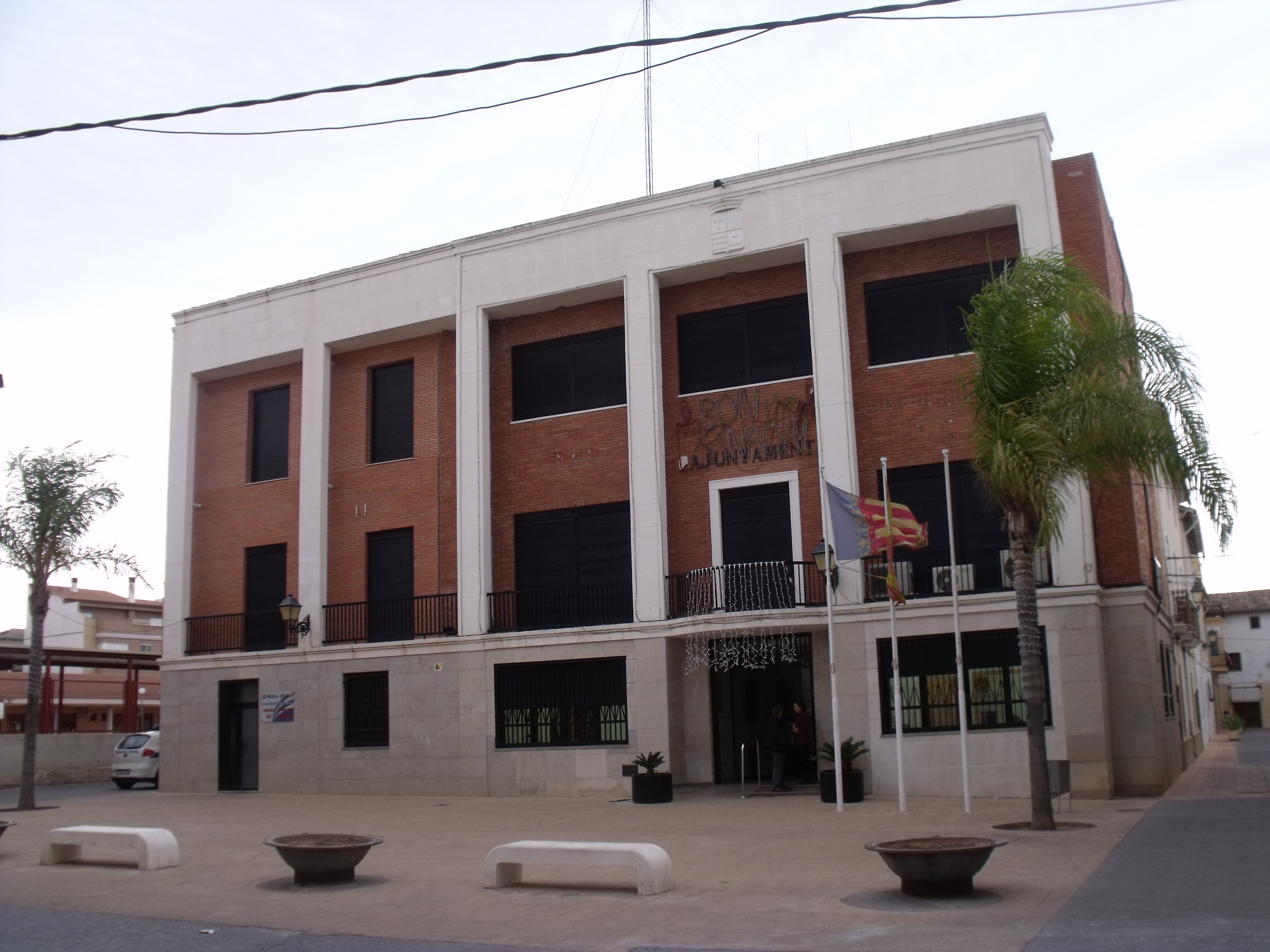
- Town hall

- Coat of arms

- Location in Spain
- Coordinates: 39°3′6″N 0°29′46″W
- Country: Spain
- Autonomous community: Valencian Community
- Province: Valencia
- Comarca: Ribera Alta
- Judicial district: Alzira

Government
  - Alcalde: José Cambra Bueno

Area
  - Total: 6 km^{2} (2.3 sq mi)
- Elevation: 40 m (130 ft)

Population (2025-01-01)
  - Total: 2,560
  - Density: 430/km^{2} (1,100/sq mi)
- Demonym: Manuelense/a
- Time zone: UTC+1 (CET)
  - Summer (DST): UTC+2 (CEST)
- Postal code: 46660
- Official language(s): Valencian
- Website: Official website

Manuel is a municipality in the comarca of Ribera Alta in the Valencian Community, Spain.

== See also ==
- List of municipalities in Valencia
