= Montserrat, Valencia =

Montserrat
- Municipality
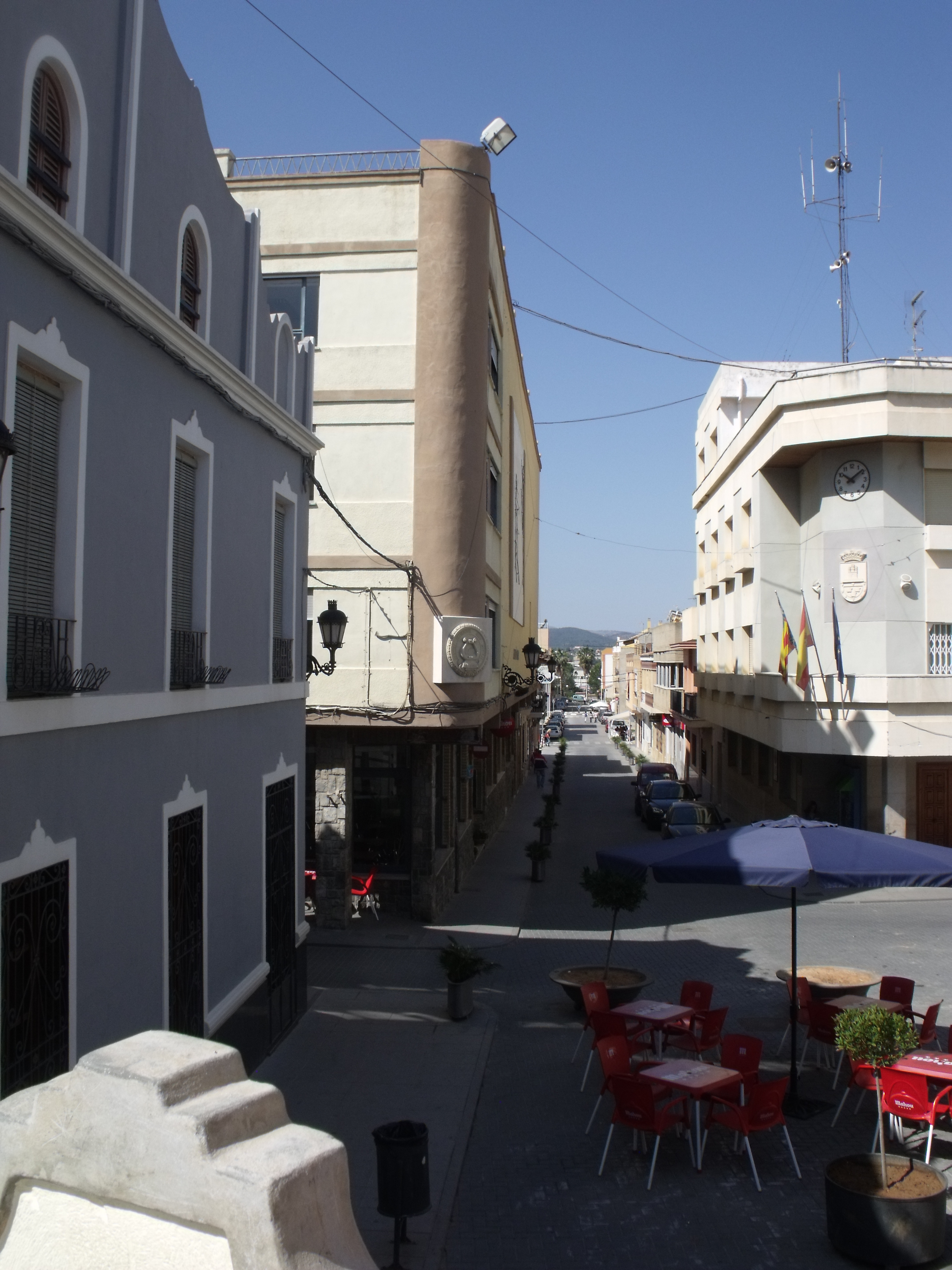

- Coat of arms

- Location in Spain
- Coordinates: 39°21′27″N 0°36′11″W
- Country: Spain
- Autonomous community: Valencian Community
- Province: Valencia
- Comarca: Ribera Alta
- Judicial district: Picassent

Government
  - Alcalde: Laura Sanjuan Campos

Area
  - Total: 45.6 km^{2} (17.6 sq mi)
- Elevation: 169 m (554 ft)

Population (2025-01-01)
  - Total: 10,062
  - Density: 221/km^{2} (572/sq mi)
- Demonym: Montserrater/a
- Time zone: UTC+1 (CET)
  - Summer (DST): UTC+2 (CEST)
- Postal code: 46192
- Official language(s): Valencian
- Website: Official website

Montserrat (Valencian pronunciation: [monseˈrat], Spanish: Monserrat), also known as Montserrat d'Alcalà, is a municipality in the comarca of Ribera Alta in the Valencian Community, Spain.

== Cultural event ==
- International week of Chamber Music of Montserrat: Since 1981, the town of Montserrat has held the “International week of Chamber Music”. Many renowned artists with extensive musical backgrounds perform at the festival.

== See also ==
- List of municipalities in Valencia
