= Turís =

- Municipality
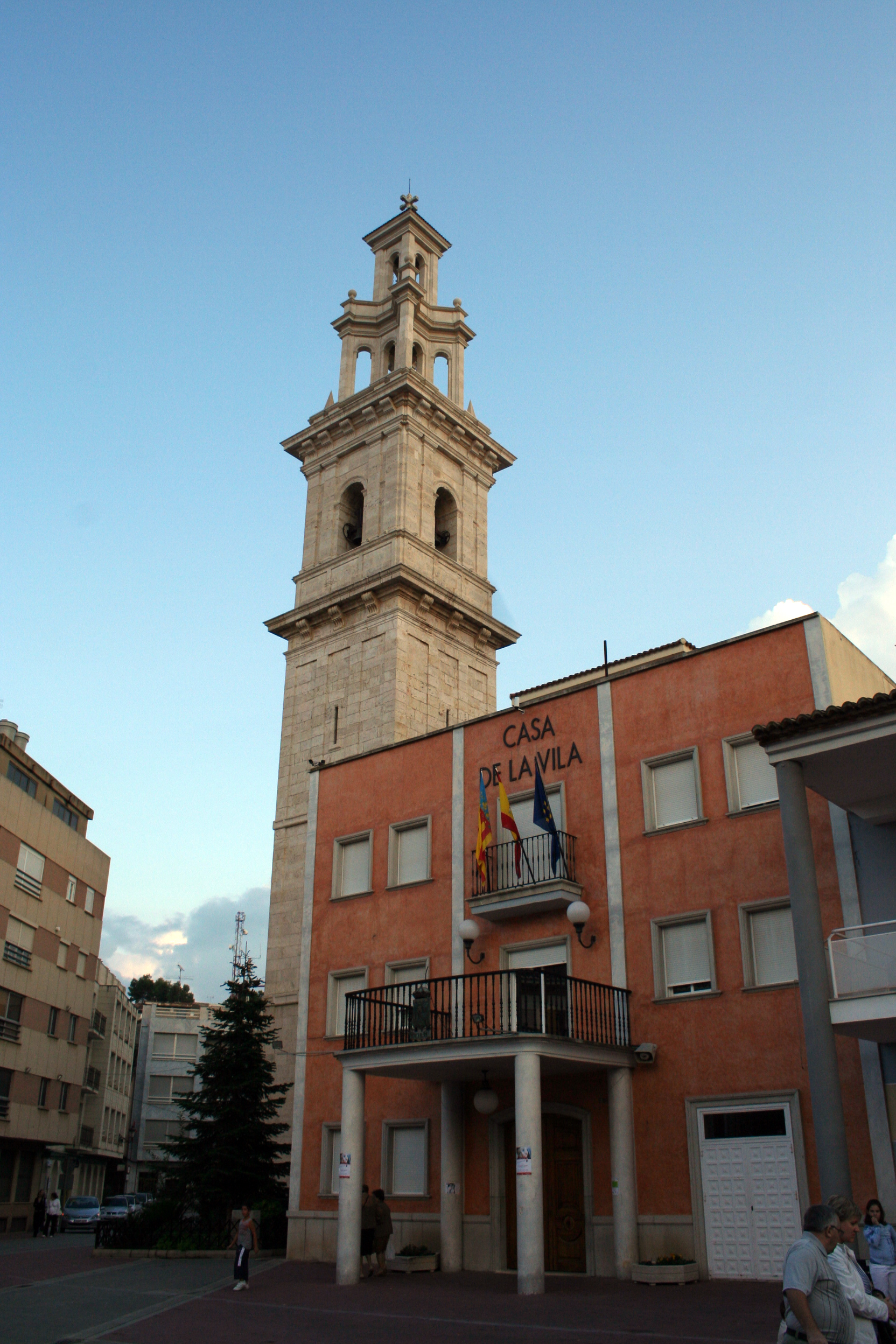
- Town hall

- Coat of arms

- Location in Spain
- Coordinates: 39°23′25″N 0°42′44″W
- Country: Spain
- Autonomous community: Valencian Community
- Province: Valencia
- Comarca: Ribera Alta
- Judicial district: Chiva

Government
  - Alcaldesa: Pilar Blasco Domingo (PSPV-PSOE)

Area
  - Total: 80.5 km^{2} (31.1 sq mi)
- Elevation: 270 m (890 ft)

Population (2025-01-01)
  - Total: 7,717
  - Density: 95.9/km^{2} (248/sq mi)
- Demonym: turisano/a
- Time zone: UTC+1 (CET)
  - Summer (DST): UTC+2 (CEST)
- Postal code: 46389
- Official language(s): Valencian
- Website: Official website

Turís (Valencian: Torís) is a municipality in the comarca of Ribera Alta in the Valencian Community, Spain. The Spanish record of 184.6 mm of precipitation in one hour and 42.0 mm of precipitation in 10 minutes was recorded in Turís, during October 2024 Spain floods.

== Villages ==
- Altury
- Cortitxelles, a village built by the Instituto Nacional de Colonización
- Masia Pavias
- Monte Tesoro
- Los Blázquez
- Montur
- Vinyamalata
- Canyada Font del "Pavo"

== See also ==
- List of municipalities in Valencia
