= Rafelguaraf =

- Municipality
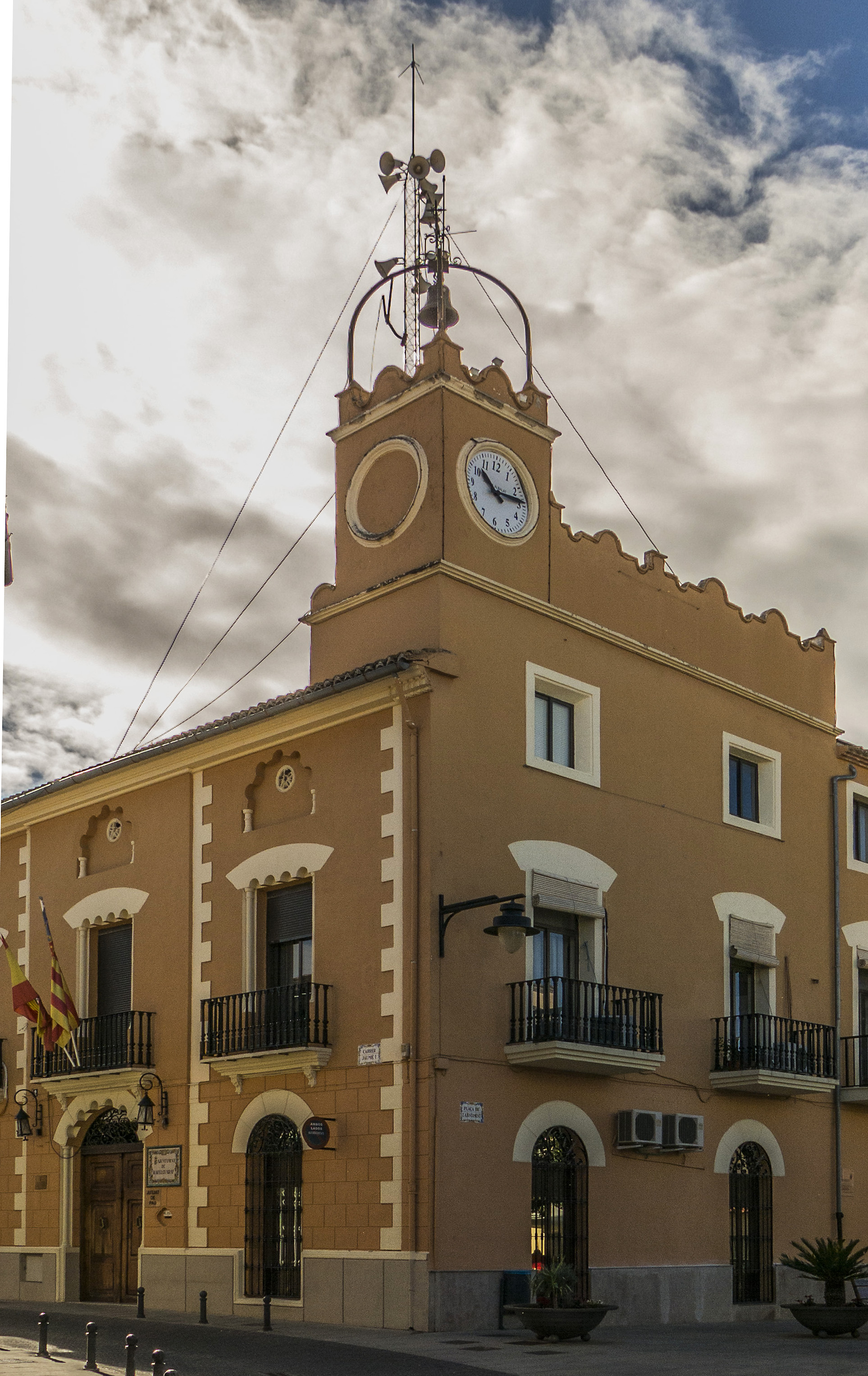
- Town hall

- Coat of arms

- Location in Spain
- Coordinates: 39°3′5″N 0°27′26″W
- Country: Spain
- Autonomous community: Valencian Community
- Province: Valencia
- Comarca: Ribera Alta
- Judicial district: Alzira

Government
  - Alcalde: Federico Tormo Vidal

Area
  - Total: 16.3 km^{2} (6.3 sq mi)
- Elevation: 38 m (125 ft)

Population (2025-01-01)
  - Total: 2,395
  - Density: 147/km^{2} (381/sq mi)
- Demonym: Rafelguareño/a
- Time zone: UTC+1 (CET)
  - Summer (DST): UTC+2 (CEST)
- Postal code: 46666
- Official language(s): Valencian
- Website: Official website

Rafelguaraf (Valencian pronunciation: [raˌfɛlɣwaˈɾaf]) is a municipality in the comarca of Ribera Alta in the Valencian Community, Spain.

== See also ==
- List of municipalities in Valencia
