= Senyera, Valencia =

Senyera
- Municipality
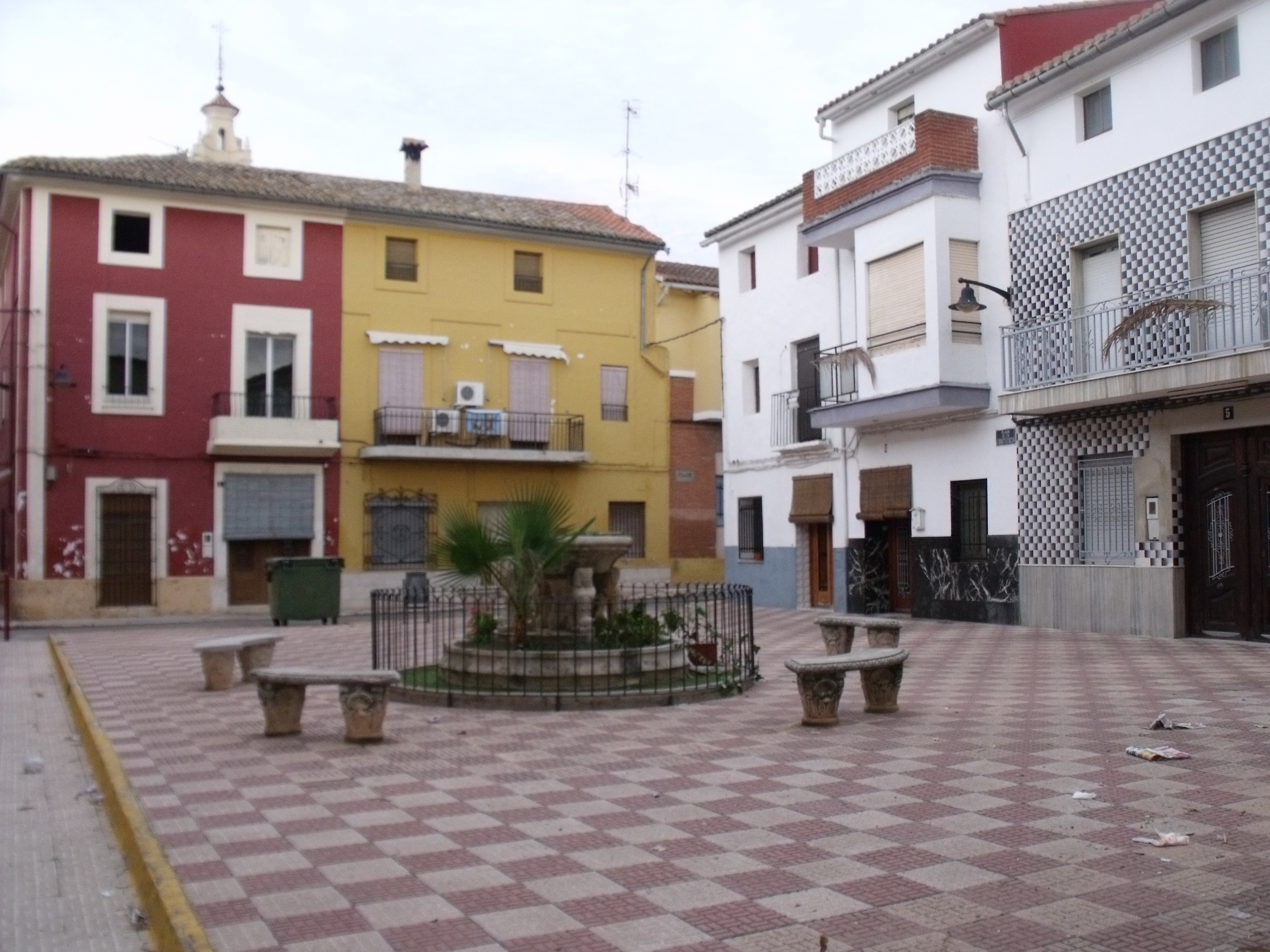
- Senyera

- Flag Coat of arms

- Location in Spain
- Coordinates: 39°3′50″N 0°30′36″W
- Country: Spain
- Autonomous community: Valencian Community
- Province: Valencia
- Comarca: Ribera Alta
- Judicial district: Alzira

Government
  - Alcalde: Ramiro Climent Espí

Area
  - Total: 2 km^{2} (0.77 sq mi)
- Elevation: 40 m (130 ft)

Population (2025-01-01)
  - Total: 1,114
  - Density: 560/km^{2} (1,400/sq mi)
- Demonym: Señerino/na
- Time zone: UTC+1 (CET)
  - Summer (DST): UTC+2 (CEST)
- Postal code: 46669
- Official language(s): Valencian
- Website: Official website

Senyera (Valencian pronunciation: [seˈɲeɾa]) is a municipality in the comarca of Ribera Alta in the Valencian Community, Spain.

== See also ==
- List of municipalities in Valencia
