= Province of Valencia =

Province of Spain

Province of Valencia Provincia de Valencia (Spanish) Província de València (Valencian)
- Province
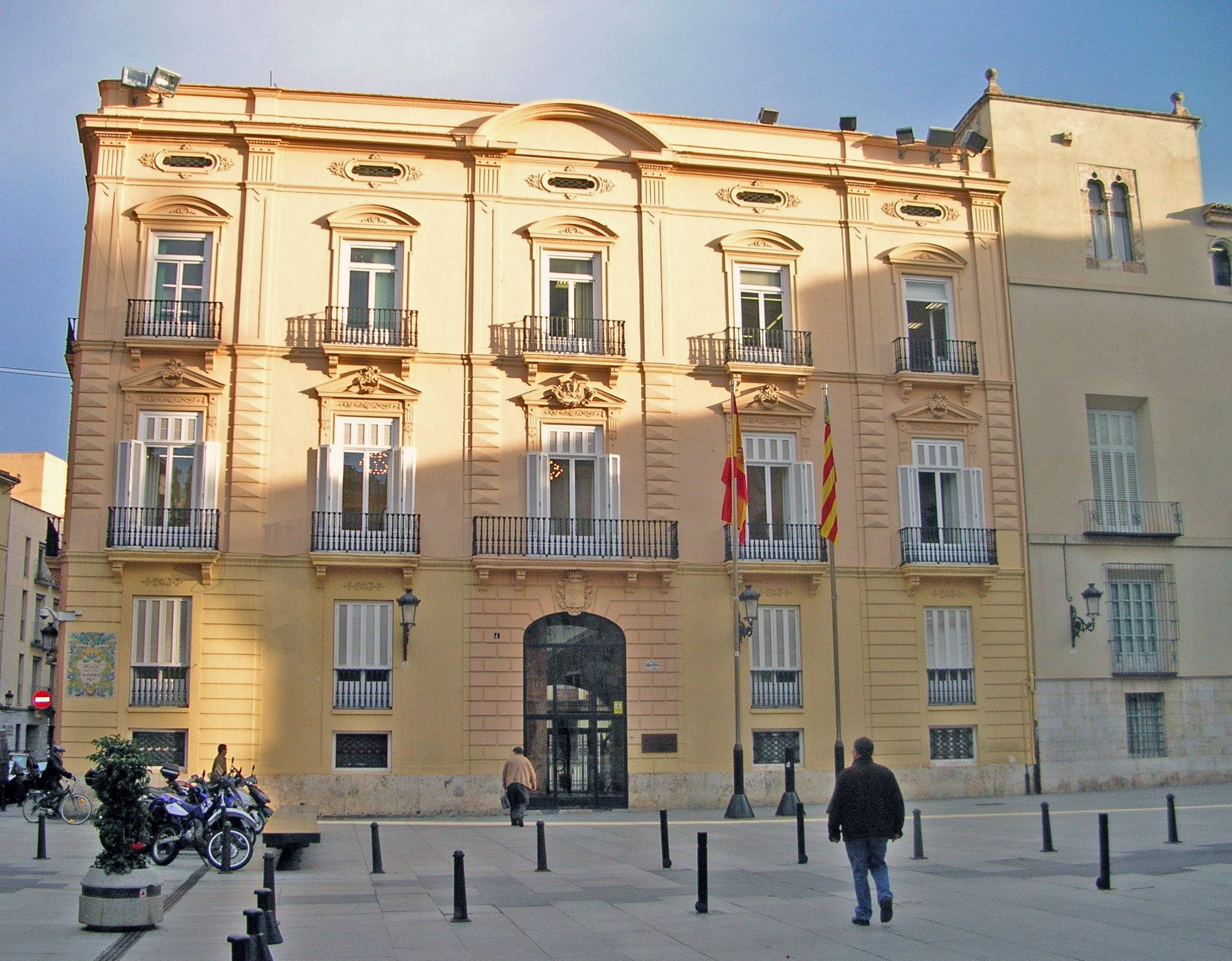
- Palau de la Batlia, headquarters of the Provincial Council

- Flag Coat of arms

- Location of the Province of Valencia in Spain
- Coordinates: 39°28′38″N 0°22′36″W
- Country: Spain
- Autonomous community: Valencian Community
- Capital: Valencia
- Municipalities: 266

Area
  - Total: 10,812.94 km^{2} (4,174.90 sq mi)
  - Rank: 20th in Spain

Population (2025)
  - Total: 2,763,996
  - Rank: 3rd in Spain
  - Density: 255.6193/km^{2} (662.0509/sq mi)
- Demonym: Valencian
- Time zone: UTC+1 (CET)
  - Summer (DST): UTC+2 (CEST)
- Official languages: Spanish and Valencian
- Parliament: Cortes Generales

The province of Valencia (Spanish: Provincia de Valencia, /vəˈlɛnsiə/ və-LEN-see-ə or /vəˈlɛnʃ(i)ə/ və-LEN-sh(ee-)ə, Spanish: [baˈlenθja]), officially València (Província de València, Valencian: [vaˈlensia]), is a province of Spain, in the central part of the Valencian Community. Of the province's 2.7 million people, almost one-third live in the capital, Valencia, which is also the capital of the autonomous community and the 3rd biggest city in Spain, with a metropolitan area of 2,522,383 people it is also one of the most populated cities of Southern Europe. There are 266 municipalities in the province.

== History ==
Although the Spanish Constitution of 1812 loosely created the province of València, a stable administrative entity does not arise until the territorial division of Spain in 1833, remaining today without major changes. The Provincial Council of Valencia dates from that period. After the Valencian Statute of Autonomy of 1982, the province became part of the Valencian Community. Valencian and Spanish are the official languages.

== Geography ==
It is bordered by the provinces of Alicante, Albacete, Cuenca, Teruel, Castellón, and the Mediterranean Sea. The northwestern side of the province is in the mountainous Sistema Ibérico area. Part of its territory, the Rincón de Ademuz, is an exclave sandwiched between the provinces of Cuenca and Teruel. The province is historically subdivided into the comarques of Camp de Túria, Camp de Morvedre, Canal de Navarrés, Costera, Hoya de Buñol, Horta de València, Horta Nord, Horta Oest, Horta Sud, Valencia, Requena-Utiel, Rincón de Ademuz, Ribera Alta, Ribera Baixa, Safor, Los Serranos, Vall d'Albaida and Valle de Cofrentes.

The province of Valencia, like the rest of the region, is mountainous in the interior, particularly in the north and west, with the Sistema Central running from north to south and the foothills of Andalusia from west to east. This mountainous interior features deep and steep valleys formed by the major rivers running through it. The plain of Valencia, is the second largest coastal plain of the country, located in the low region between the Júcar and Turia river valleys. It is about thirty miles long and twenty wide; on three sides it is bounded by the mountains of Segura, and on the fourth by the sea. In 1843 it was cited as "one of the most fertile and best cultivated spots in Europe". The other main rivers include the Palancia and the Serpis. The Altiplano de Requena-Utiel range, in the interior of the Valencia region, has an average height of about 750 m. The principal mountains in the province are Cerro Calderón (1837 m), Sierra del Caroche (1126 m), Sierra del Benicadell (1104 m), Serra Calderona (907 m), Sierra Martés (1085 m), Sierra de Utiel (1306 m), Sierra de Enguera (1056 m), and the Sierra de Mondúver (841 m).

== Demographics ==
Historical population
Year	Pop.	±%
1842	460,224	—
1857	606,129	+31.7%
1877	677,286	+11.7%
1887	730,916	+7.9%
1900	806,547	+10.3%
1910	886,467	+9.9%
1920	933,681	+5.3%
1930	1,042,978	+11.7%
1940	1,269,373	+21.7%
1950	1,344,365	+5.9%
1960	1,438,043	+7.0%
1970	1,769,552	+23.1%
1981	2,065,704	+16.7%
1991	2,117,927	+2.5%
2001	2,216,285	+4.6%
2011	2,563,342	+15.7%
2021	2,593,243	+1.2%
Source: INE

As of 2025, the population is 2,763,996, of which 48.9% are male, and 51.1% are female. Minors make up 16.4% of the population, and seniors make up 20.0%.

=== Immigration ===
As of 2025, immigrants make up 20.9% of the population. The 5 largest foreign countries of birth are Colombia, Venezuela, Morocco, Argentina, and Romania.

Foreign-born population (2025)
Country of birth	Population
Colombia	77,125
Venezuela	46,147
Morocco	40,838
Argentina	36,379
Romania	33,883
Ecuador	28,078
Ukraine	24,606
France	24,055
Honduras	17,208
China	15,714
Bolivia	15,252
Russia	14,622
Bulgaria	13,891
Cuba	12,768
Pakistan	12,604

== Municipalities ==
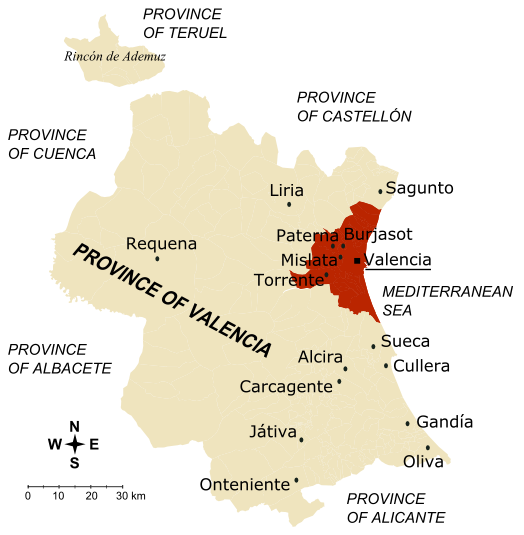
Map of the province of València and its main towns. The first crown of València metropolitan area is in dark brown.

The province has 266 municipalities:

- Ademuz
- Ador
- Agullent
- Aielo de Malferit
- Aielo de Rugat
- Alaquàs
- Albaida
- Albal
- Albalat de la Ribera
- Albalat dels Sorells
- Albalat dels Tarongers
- Alberic
- Alborache
- Alboraya
- Albuixech
- Alcàntera de Xúquer
- Alcàsser
- Alcublas
- L'Alcúdia
- L'Alcúdia de Crespins
- Aldaia
- Alfafar
- Alfara de la Baronia
- Alfara del Patriarca
- Alfarp
- Alfarrasí
- Alfauir
- Algar de Palancia
- Algemesí
- Algímia d'Alfara
- Alginet
- Almàssera
- Almiserà
- Almoines
- Almussafes
- Alpuente
- L'Alqueria de la Comtessa
- Alzira
- Andilla
- Anna
- Antella
- Aras de los Olmos
- Atzeneta d'Albaida
- Ayora
- Barx
- Barxeta
- Bèlgida
- Bellreguard
- Bellús
- Benagéber
- Benaguasil
- Benavites
- Beneixida
- Benetússer
- Beniarjó
- Beniatjar
- Benicolet
- Benicull de Xúquer
- Benifaió
- Benifairó de la Valldigna
- Benifairó de les Valls
- Beniflá
- Benigànim
- Benimodo
- Benimuslem
- Beniparrell
- Benirredrà
- Benissanó
- Benissoda
- Benissuera
- Bétera
- Bicorp
- Bocairent
- Bolbaite
- Bonrepòs i Mirambell
- Bufali
- Bugarra
- Buñol
- Burjassot
- Calles
- Camporrobles
- Canals
- Canet d'En Berenguer
- Carcaixent
- Càrcer
- Carlet
- Carrícola
- Casas Altas
- Casas Bajas
- Casinos
- Castelló
- Castelló de Rugat
- Castellonet de la Conquesta
- Castielfabib
- Catadau
- Catarroja
- Caudete de las Fuentes
- Cerdà
- Chella
- Chelva
- Chera
- Cheste
- Chiva
- Chulilla
- Cofrentes
- Corbera
- Cortes de Pallás
- Cotes
- Cullera
- Daimús
- Domeño
- Dos Aguas
- L'Eliana
- Emperador
- Enguera
- L'Énova
- Estivella
- Estubeny
- Faura
- Favara
- Foios
- La Font d'En Carròs
- La Font de la Figuera
- Fontanars dels Alforins
- Fortaleny
- Fuenterrobles
- Gandia
- Gátova
- Gavarda
- El Genovés
- Gestalgar
- Gilet
- Godella
- Godelleta
- La Granja de la Costera
- Guadasséquies
- Guadassuar
- Guardamar de la Safor
- Higueruelas
- Jalance
- Jarafuel
- Llanera de Ranes
- Llaurí
- Llíria
- Llocnou de la Corona
- Llocnou de Sant Jeroni
- Llocnou d'En Fenollet
- Llombai
- La Llosa de Ranes
- Llutxent
- Loriguilla
- Losa del Obispo
- Macastre
- Manises
- Manuel
- Marines
- Massalavés
- Massalfassar
- Massamagrell
- Massanassa
- Meliana
- Millares
- Miramar
- Mislata
- Mogente / Moixent
- Moncada
- Montaverner
- Montesa
- Montitxelvo
- Montroi
- Montserrat
- Museros
- Náquera / Nàquera
- Navarrés
- Novetlè
- Oliva
- L'Olleria
- Olocau
- Ontinyent
- Otos
- Paiporta
- Palma de Gandía
- Palmera
- El Palomar
- Paterna
- Pedralba
- Petrés
- Picanya
- Picassent
- Piles
- Pinet
- La Pobla de Farnals
- La Pobla de Vallbona
- La Pobla del Duc
- La Pobla Llarga
- Polinyà de Xúquer
- Potries
- Puçol
- Puebla de San Miguel
- El Puig de Santa Maria
- Quart de les Valls
- Quart de Poblet
- Quartell
- Quatretonda
- Quesa
- Rafelbunyol
- Rafelcofer
- Rafelguaraf
- Ráfol de Salem
- Real
- El Real de Gandia
- Requena
- Riba-roja de Túria
- Riola
- Rocafort
- Rotglà i Corberà
- Ròtova
- Rugat
- Sagunto / Sagunt
- Salem
- San Antonio de Benagéber
- Sant Joanet
- Sedaví
- Segart
- Sellent
- Sempere
- Senyera
- Serra
- Siete Aguas
- Silla
- Simat de la Valldigna
- Sinarcas
- Sollana
- Sot de Chera
- Sueca
- Sumacàrcer
- Tavernes Blanques
- Tavernes de la Valldigna
- Teresa de Cofrentes
- Terrateig
- Titaguas
- Torrebaja
- Torrella
- Torrent
- Torres Torres
- Tous
- Tuéjar
- Turís
- Utiel
- València
- Vallada
- Vallanca
- Vallés
- Venta del Moro
- Villalonga / Vilallonga
- Vilamarxant
- Villar del Arzobispo
- Villargordo del Cabriel
- Vinalesa
- Xàtiva
- Xeraco
- Xeresa
- Xirivella
- Yátova
- La Yesa
- Zarra

== Economy ==
The València plains are known for their olive, mulberry, ilex, algaroba, orange, and palm trees, with the appearance of an "immense garden". Such is the fertility of the soil, that two and three crops in the year are generally obtained, and the greater part of the land returns eight per cent. The rice crops are the most valuable, and are chiefly produced in the tract which is irrigated by the Albufera, a large lake in the neighbourhood of València. Rice being the principal food of the lower classes, the crop is generally consumed in the province, with the exception of a small quantity which finds its way into Castile and Andalusia. The other chief product is the white mulberry, once the source of great wealth: it was worked in the silk-factories of València. In 1828, the produce of silk from the vega of València amounted to one million of pounds yearly, the greater part of which was exported in its raw state, but the produce has greatly increased since, owing to demands from the manufacturers of Lyon and other towns in the south of France. The province of València is a notable producer of satins, silk ribbons, and velvets. The export of fruit from Valencia is also considerable, particularly of raisins. The raisins are of two kinds, the muscatel, and an inferior and smaller raisin, called pasa de legia. The export of figs, oil, and wine from the province and ports of València is also considerable, with a wine known as Beni Carlo, which as of 1843 was shipped to Cette. Mercury, copper, sulphur, arsenic, argentiferous lead, iron, coal, etc. are among the mineral products, but they are procured only in small quantities. Today, tourism is a major source of income, with the city of Valencia and the resort towns along the coast being the primary earners during the summer months.
