= David Bernabeu =

Spanish cyclist (born 1975)

Personal information
- Full name: Vicente David Bernabeu Armengol
- Born: 9 January 1975 (age 51) La Pobla Llarga, Spain

Cycling career
- Sport: Cycling
- Discipline: Road
- Role: Rider

Professional teams
- 1999–2002: Boavista
- 2003–2004: Milaneza
- 2005–2006: Comunidad Valenciana–Elche
- 2007: Fuerteventura–Canarias
- 2008–2010: Barbot–Siper
- 2011: Andalucía–Caja Granada

Major wins
- Stage races Paris–Nice 1 individual stage (2003)

Vicente David Bernabeu Armengol (born 9 January 1975 in Valencia) is a former Spanish professional road bicycle racer.

== Palmarès ==
2002
Tour du Finistère
1st, Overall, Troféu Joaquim Agostinho

1st, Stage 3

2003
Paris-Nice

1st, stage 7

2004
1st, Overall, Volta a Portugal
1st, Overall, Troféu Joaquim Agostinho
8th Overall Tour de Pologne
2006
1st, Overall, Vuelta a Mallorca

1st, Trofeo Pollença
