= Alfarb =

Alfarb Alfarp
- Municipality
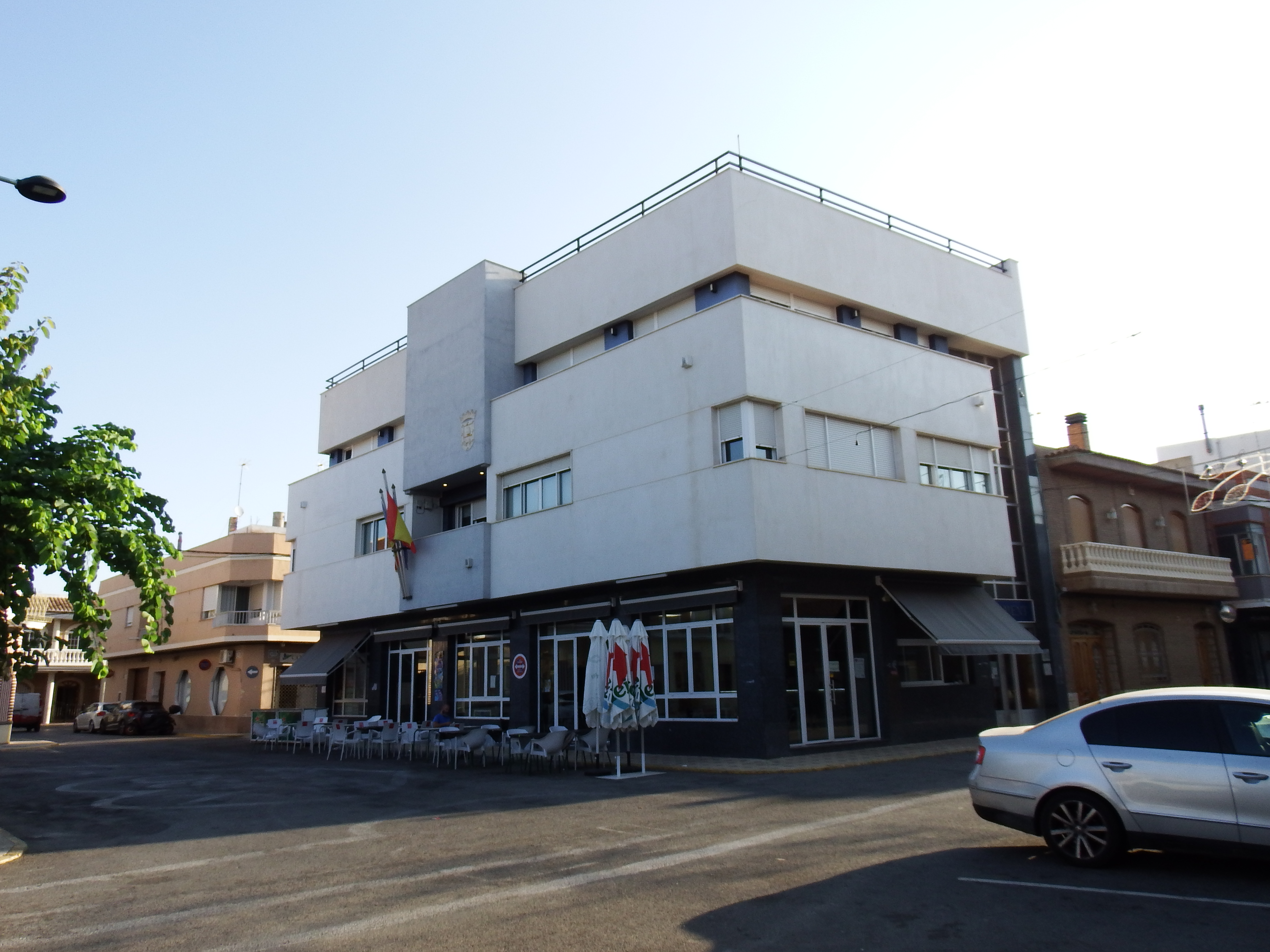
- Town hall

- Coat of arms

- Location in Spain
- Coordinates: 39°16′35″N 0°33′39″W
- Country: Spain
- Autonomous community: Valencian Community
- Province: Valencia
- Comarca: Ribera Alta
- Judicial district: Picassent

Government
  - Alcalde: Santi Cervera Cardete

Area
  - Total: 20.6 km^{2} (8.0 sq mi)
- Elevation: 95 m (312 ft)

Population (2025-01-01)
  - Total: 1,763
  - Density: 85.6/km^{2} (222/sq mi)
- Demonyms: Alfarbí, alfarbina
- Time zone: UTC+1 (CET)
  - Summer (DST): UTC+2 (CEST)
- Postal code: 46197
- Official language(s): Valencian
- Website: https://www.alfarp.es

Alfarb (Valencian: [alˈfaɾp]; Spanish: Alfarp [alˈfaɾ(β)]) is a municipality in the comarca of Ribera Alta in the Valencian Community, Spain.

== See also ==
- List of municipalities in Valencia
