= Càrcer =

- Municipality
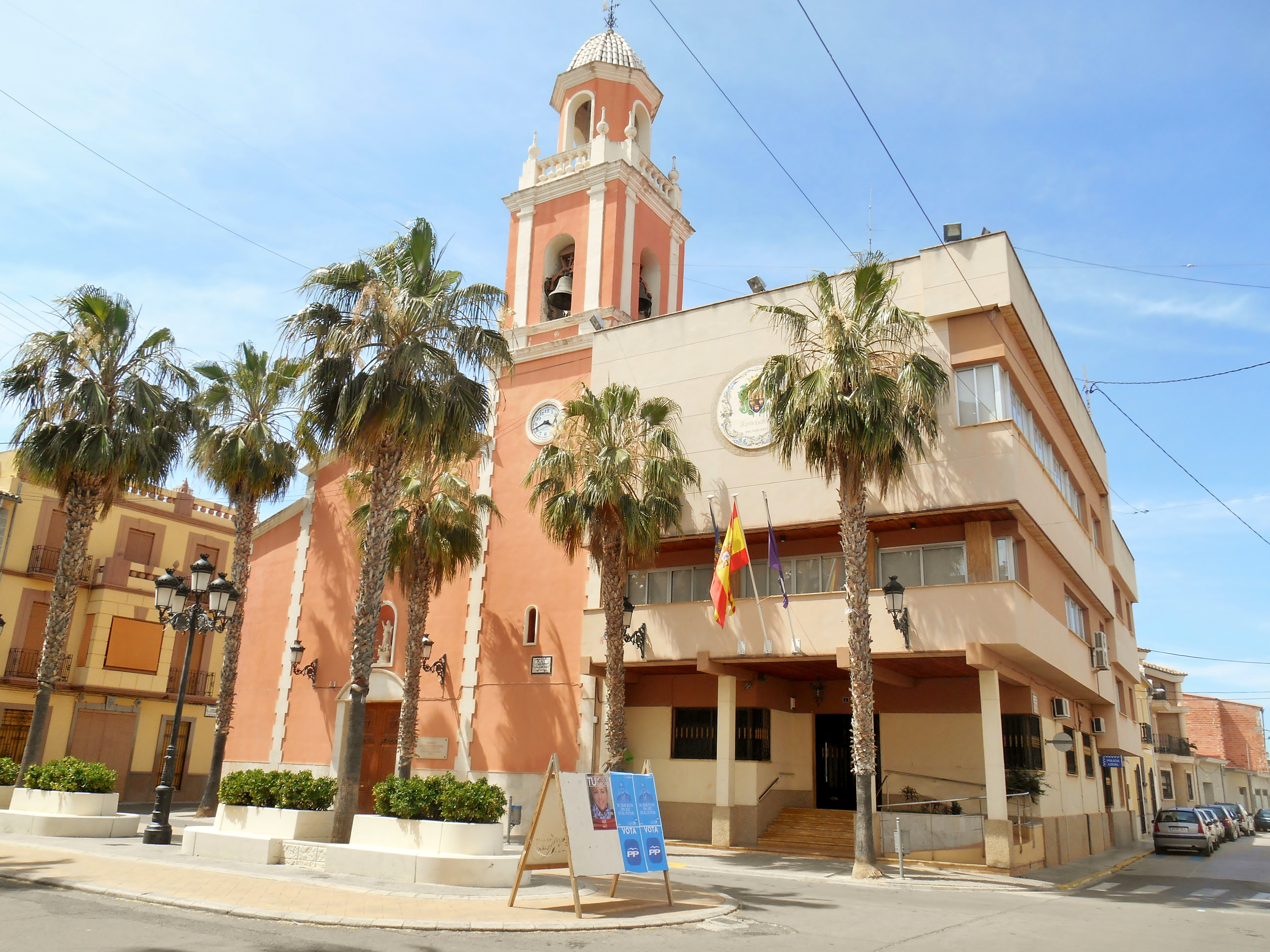
- Town hall

- Coat of arms

- Location in Spain
- Coordinates: 39°4′N 0°34′W
- Country: Spain
- Autonomous community: Valencian Community
- Province: Valencia
- Comarca: Ribera Alta
- Judicial district: Alzira

Government
  - Alcalde: Marta Hernandis Martínez

Area
  - Total: 7.4 km^{2} (2.9 sq mi)
- Elevation: 39 m (128 ft)

Population (2025-01-01)
  - Total: 1,795
  - Density: 240/km^{2} (630/sq mi)
- Demonym(s): Carcerí, carcerina
- Time zone: UTC+1 (CET)
  - Summer (DST): UTC+2 (CEST)
- Postal code: 46294
- Official language(s): Valencian
- Website: Official website

Càrcer (Spanish: Cárcer) is a municipality in the comarca of Ribera Alta in the Valencian Community, Spain.

== Infrastructure ==
=== Education ===
With a population near 2.120, Càrcer has a public school's Pare Gumilla, and Cárcer High School. The village also has a music school (Unió Musical Càrcer).

=== Hospitals ===
The village has the Centre de salut Càrcer (Medical Center) and is near from Alzira Hospital and Hospital Lluís Alcanyís de Xàtiva.

== Notable people ==
- José Gumilla, a Jesuit priest who wrote a natural history of the Orinoco River region

== See also ==
- List of municipalities in Valencia
