= Benimodo =

- Municipality
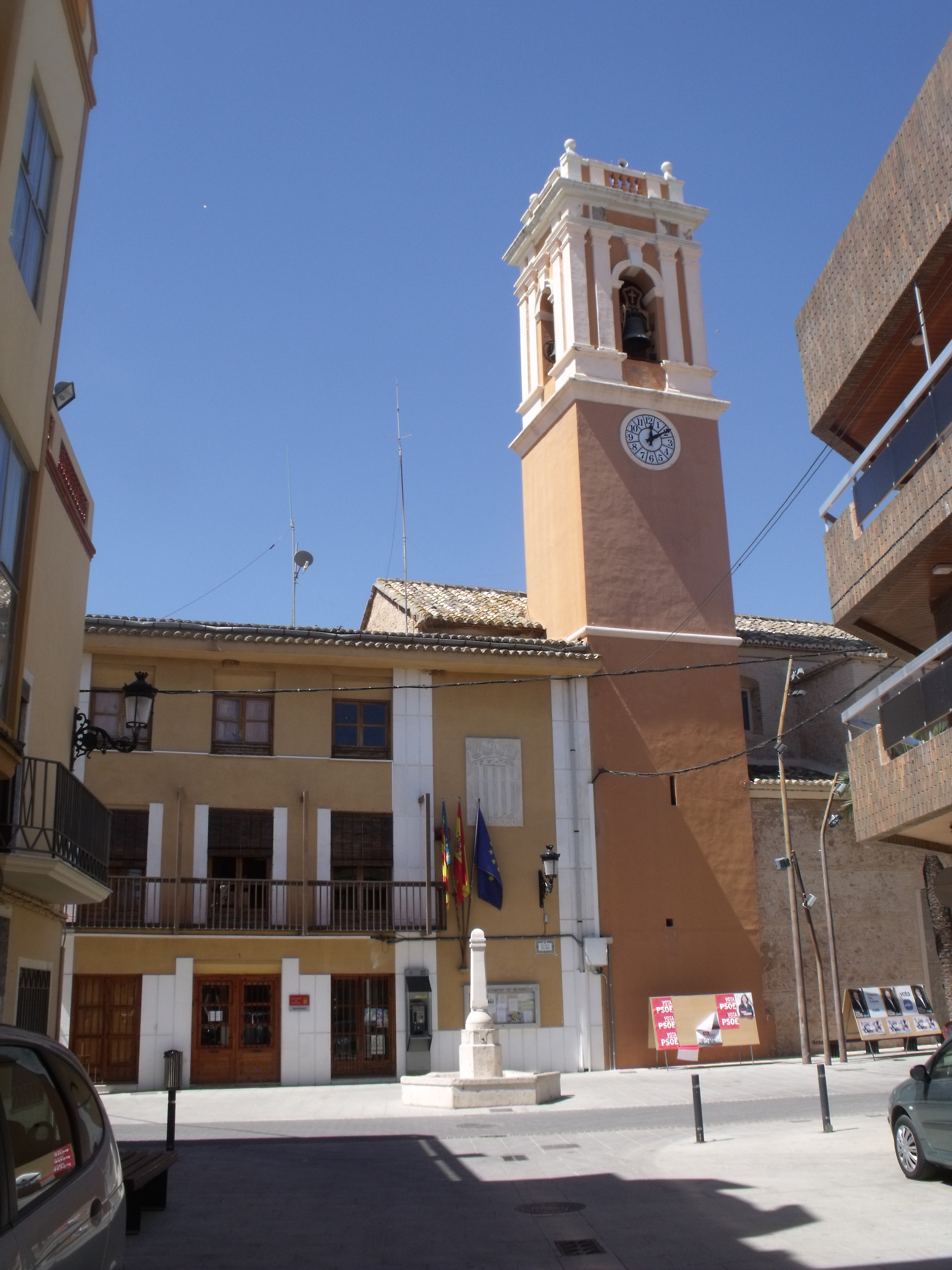
- Town hall

- Coat of arms

- Location in Spain
- Coordinates: 39°12′50″N 0°31′41″W
- Country: Spain
- Autonomous community: Valencian Community
- Province: Valencia
- Comarca: Ribera Alta
- Judicial district: Carlet
- Founded: 1250

Government
  - Alcalde: José Luis Sanchis Oliver

Area
  - Total: 12.5 km^{2} (4.8 sq mi)
- Elevation: 42 m (138 ft)

Population (2025-01-01)
  - Total: 2,332
  - Density: 187/km^{2} (483/sq mi)
- Demonym(s): Benimodí, benimodina
- Time zone: UTC+1 (CET)
  - Summer (DST): UTC+2 (CEST)
- Postal code: 46291
- Official language(s): Valencian
- Website: Official website

Benimodo is a municipality in the comarca of Ribera Alta in the Valencian Community, Spain.

== See also ==
- List of municipalities in Valencia
