= L'Énova =

- Municipality
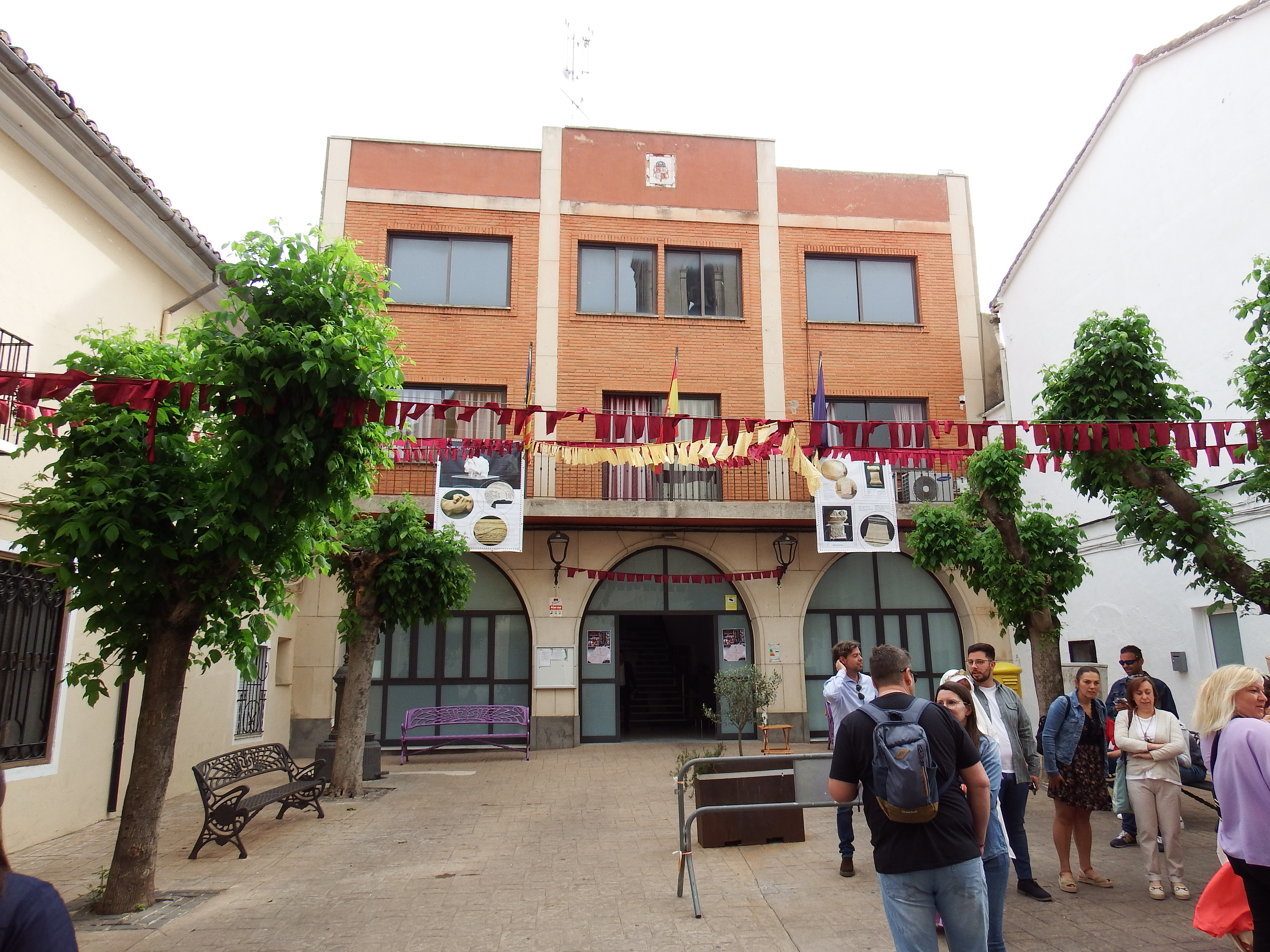
- Town hall

- Coat of arms

- Location in Spain
- Coordinates: 39°2′40″N 0°28′56″W
- Country: Spain
- Autonomous community: Valencian Community
- Province: Valencia
- Comarca: Ribera Alta
- Judicial district: Alzira

Government
  - Alcalde: Tomás Giner Esparza (PSPV-PSOE)

Area
  - Total: 7.7 km^{2} (3.0 sq mi)
- Elevation: 50 m (160 ft)

Population (2025-01-01)
  - Total: 952
  - Density: 120/km^{2} (320/sq mi)
- Time zone: UTC+1 (CET)
  - Summer (DST): UTC+2 (CEST)
- Postal code: 46669
- Official language(s): Valencian
- Website: Official website

L'Énova (Valencian pronunciation: [ˈlenova]) is a municipality in the comarca of Ribera Alta in the Valencian Community, Spain. In 2021, the name was changed from L'Ènova, in order to reflect the current pronunciation.

== Main sights ==
- Villa romana: Roman villa, dating from the 2nd century. The site corresponds to a Roman villa belonging to a patrician noble man, Publius Cornelius lunianus, and has an area of about 2600 m^{2}. The excavations have brought various mosaics, domestic baths, a private temple with a sculpture, the sepulchral inscription of a Roman freedman, marble, coins, glass and much pottery remain. The remains revealed that the village consisted on an arcaded courtyard, rich architectural elements (rooms covered by marble, terracotta floor, sculptures.) thermal baths and a temple.
- Cantera Romana: Dated from the 1st and 2nd centuries, it is located about 500 meters from the villa. Placed in “La Partida dels Francs”, the quarry was made by different arms by which the marble was extracted. It has been found a quarry in the chapel, it is carved into the rock and an iron wedge of about 20 cm in length, the unique in the Iberian Peninsula. Some ceramic remains and card marks in the stone have also been found.

== See also ==
- List of municipalities in Valencia
