= Antella =

- Municipality
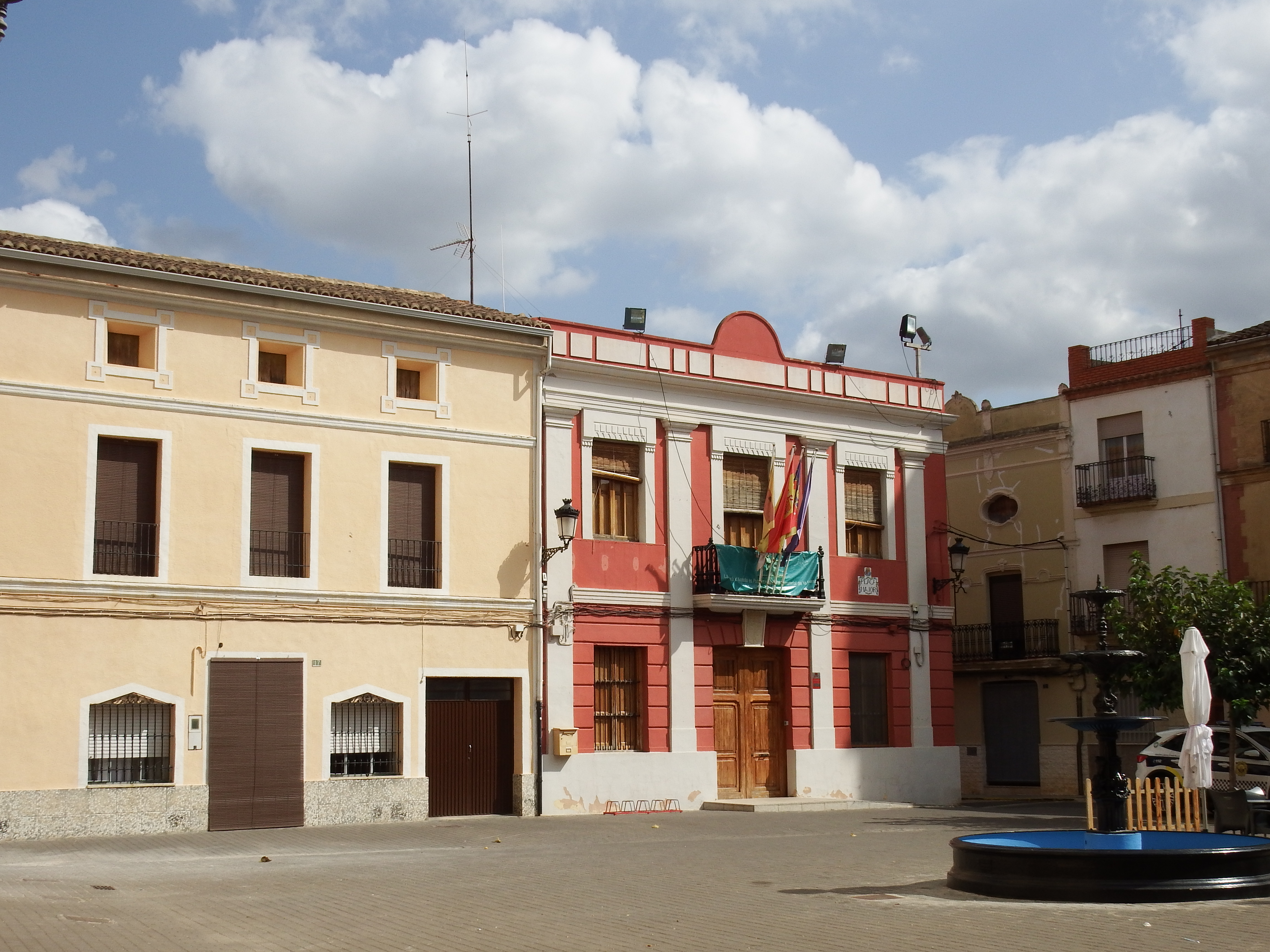
- Town hall

- Flag Coat of arms

- Location in Spain
- Coordinates: 39°4′58″N 0°35′26″W
- Country: Spain
- Autonomous community: Valencian Community
- Province: Valencia
- Comarca: Ribera Alta
- Judicial district: Alzira
- Founded: 1250

Government
  - Alcalde: María Isabel Giménez Candel

Area
  - Total: 17.6 km^{2} (6.8 sq mi)
- Elevation: 44 m (144 ft)

Population (2025-01-01)
  - Total: 1,130
  - Density: 64.2/km^{2} (166/sq mi)
- Demonyms: Antellà, antellana
- Time zone: UTC+1 (CET)
  - Summer (DST): UTC+2 (CEST)
- Postal code: 46266
- Official language(s): Valencian
- Website: Official website

Antella is a municipality in the comarca of Ribera Alta in the Valencian Community, Spain. It is also a fraction of Bagno a Ripoli, province of Florence in Italy.

== See also ==
- List of municipalities in Valencia
