= Canals, Spain =

Canals
- Municipality
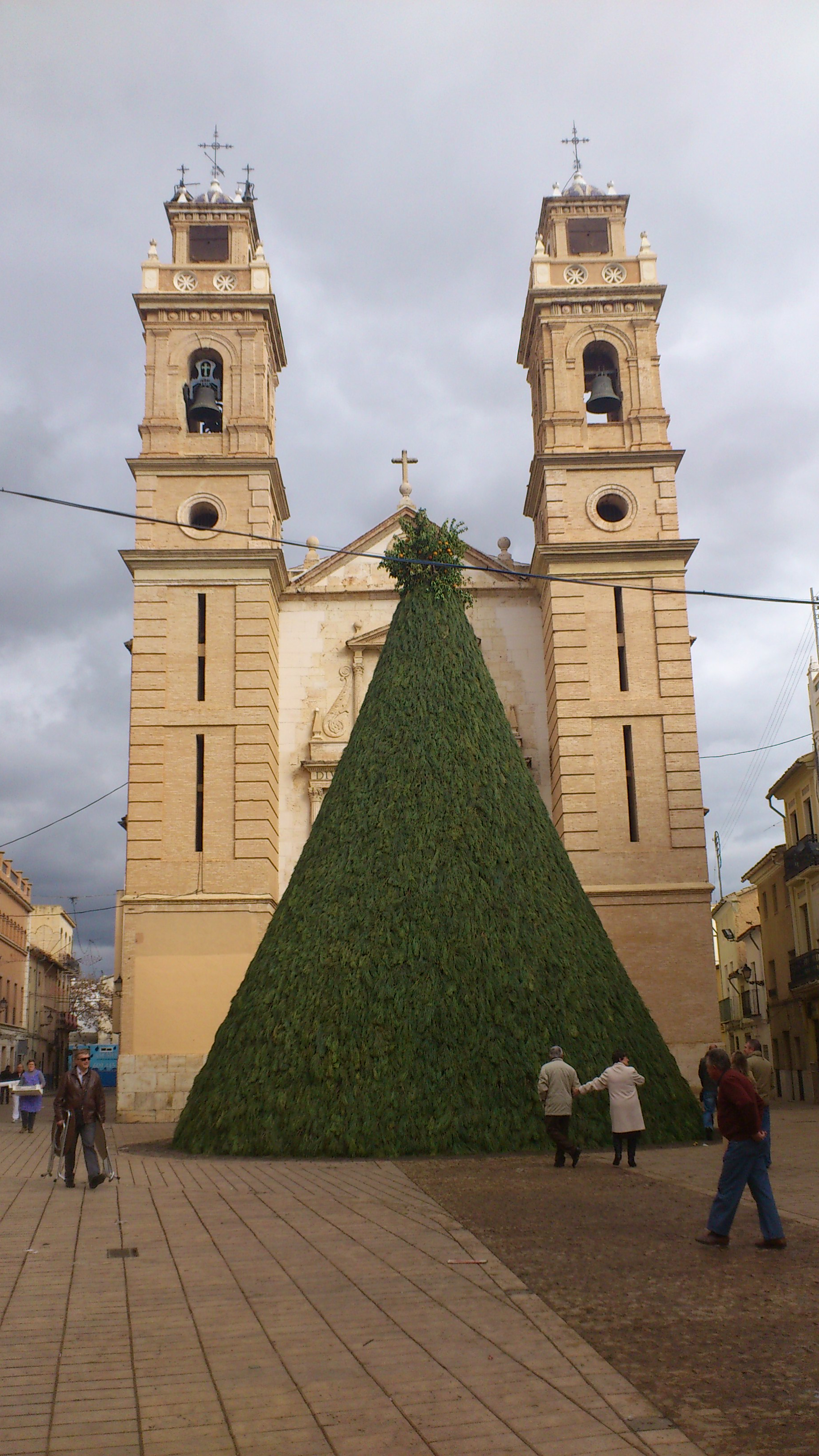

- Coat of arms

- Location in Spain
- Coordinates: 38°57′40″N 0°35′6″W
- Country: Spain
- Autonomous community: Valencian Community
- Province: Valencia
- Comarca: Costera
- Judicial district: Xàtiva

Government
  - Alcalde: María José Castells Villalta (2019) (Compromís)

Area
  - Total: 21.90 km^{2} (8.46 sq mi)
- Elevation: 160 m (520 ft)

Population (2025-01-01)
  - Total: 13,746
  - Density: 627.7/km^{2} (1,626/sq mi)
- Demonym(s): Canalí(Catalan); Canalense (Spanish)
- Time zone: UTC+1 (CET)
  - Summer (DST): UTC+2 (CEST)
- Postal code: 46650
- Official language(s): Valencian
- Website: www.canals.es

Canals is a municipality (pop., INE 2007: 13,771) in the comarca of Costera in the Valencian Community, Spain.

It shares borders with the municipalities of l'Alcúdia de Crespins, Cerdà, la Granja de la Costera, Xàtiva, Llanera de Ranes, Montesa, Torrella and Vallés (in the same comarca) and with Aielo de Malferit and l'Olleria (comarca of Vall d'Albaida).

== Geography ==
Canals is located in the valley of Montesa, between the Grossa mountains and la Costera. The highest points are in la Serra Grossa, where we can find the peaks of l'Atalaia (556 m) and la Creu (520 m), on the municipal boundary with l'Olleria. The Cànyoles River crosses the town in the west-northeast direction; the Sants River begins its course close to town, where it divides into two channels (séquies) that bring water to Xàtiva and the fields of Canals.

The village lies on the left bank of the Cànyoles river. Canals and l'Alcúdia de Crespins together form a conurbation.

From València you can reach Canals taking the A-7 highway.

=== Towns of the municipality ===
- Canals
- Aiacor
- Torre d'En Cerdà, or Torre dels Frares.

== History ==
Some evidence of Roman civilization has been found. During the year of Muslim occupation it was a very important "alqueria" owned by Xàtiva.

Then in the Christian era, in 1244, king James I of Aragon gave Dionís of Hungary the tower and the small village of Canals and created the new lordship of the Señorío de Torre de Canals. Dionis of Hungary gave the king the castle in the valley of Veo and also the castle of Ain and other territories. The Christian resettlement was made by Catalans. On July 30, Peter IV "el Cerimoniós" gave the place to Raimon de Riusech taking it from Joan Eximenis d'Urrea, with the condition that if he had no male descendants it would be given back to the crown, but in the end it was sold to Xàtiva, with the king's approval on February 19 of 1353 as a barony. During the rule by Xàtiva there were continuous tributary conflicts. In the year 1506, Xàtiva bought La Torreta.

In 1522 during the Revolt of the Brotherhoods, Canals was used by the viceroy as his headquarters to attack Xàtiva, where the 'Encobert' was hidden. Many prisoners were taken from Xàtiva to Canals. In 1639, Phillip IV paid Xàtiva 20.000 pounds, and gave independence to Canals as a village (vila). In the 19th century Canals developed industry, with 24 glass factories, a paper factory, metal workshops, flour mills, and cloth sellers. In the 20th century this industrial activity increased with oil, furniture, construction materials, leather and cloth production.

== Demography ==
Canals demography evolution
1900	1910	1920	1930	1940	1950	1960	1970	1981	1991	1996	2002	2006	2007
4.695	4.857	4.967	5.261	5821	6.176	7.350	9.080	11.151	12.185	12.886	13.040	13.150	13.771

== Main sights ==
- Tower and walls of the Borgias
- Oratory of the Borgias
- Route of the Borgias

== People from Canals ==
- Alfons de Borja, Pope Callixtus III

== Economy ==
The economy is divided into agriculture (oranges), industry famous for its clothing and leather production (Ferry's, Rodrigo Sancho S.A.), and marble. Today the industry is almost dead with the main companies having closed down: Ferry's (2007), Argent (2008), Rodrigo Sancho S.A. (2010), and many others.

Pottery has also been very important, and has given the people from Canals the nickname of "perolers" (potters).

== See also ==
- List of municipalities in Valencia
