= C-2 (Cercanías Valencia) =

Railway line in Valencia, Spain

Line C-2

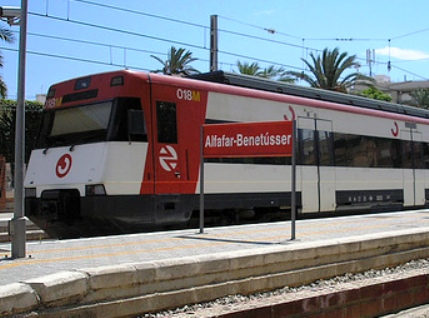

Overview
- Service type: Commuter service

Route
- Termini: Valencia North Station; Moixent Station
- Distance travelled: 54.70 miles
- Electrification: Yes

The C-2 commuter line of Cercanías Valencia covers a distance of 84 km across the province of Valencia in the Valencian Community, Spain, between Valencia Nord and Moixent. It serves the municipalities of Valencia, Alfafar, Benetússer, Massanassa, Catarroja, Albal, Silla, Benifaió, Almussafes, Algemesí, Alzira, Carcaixent, La Pobla Llarga, Manuel, L'Ènova, Xátiva, L'Alcúdia de Crespins, Montesa, Vallada, and Moixent.

== Route ==
Stop	Km	Cercanías transfers
Valencia Nord	0	Line C-1 (Cercanías Valencia) Line C-3 (Cercanías Valencia) Line C-5 (Cercanías Valencia) Line C-6 (Cercanías Valencia)
Alfafar-Benetússer	5.11	Line C-1 (Cercanías Valencia)
Massanassa	6.64	Line C-1 (Cercanías Valencia)
Catarroja	7.66	Line C-1 (Cercanías Valencia)
Albal	8.51	Line C-1 (Cercanías Valencia)
Silla	12.12	Line C-1 (Cercanías Valencia)
Benifaió-Almussafes	21.02	—
Algemesí	31.22	—
Alzira	35.72	—
Carcaixent	39.32	—
La Pobla Llarga	43.72	—
Ènova-Manuel	48.42	—
Xàtiva	55.62	—
L'Alcúdia de Crespins	66.02	—
Montesa	71.82	—
Vallada	77.02	—
Moixent	84.82	—

Starting from Valencia Nord Station, the C-2 line heads south along the common track shared with other lines until it joins the Valencia-La Encina line of the Mediterranean Corridor. The first station is located on the boundary between the municipalities of Alfafar and Benetússer, both part of the Horta Sur region, and it bears the combined name of both municipalities. The line then passes through Massanassa with another station, followed by Catarroja, Albal and Silla, each with their own stations.

After Silla, it separates from the Silla-Gandía line, where the C-1 line continues, and continues southward. The first municipality it passes through is Benifaió, with a station that also bears the name of the neighboring town, Almussafes, located 1 km away.

The next municipality along the line with a station is Algemesí, where the station is located near the city center.

The line continues its journey through Alzira and Carcaixent, with a station in each municipality. The first station is situated to the west of the urban area, while the second is located at the western end of the urban area. The line then passes through La Pobla Llarga, where the next station is located at the eastern end of the urban area.

Further ahead, the line deviates onto the Manuel-Énova variant, which opened to traffic in 2009. It passes through L'Enova, where it has the Ènova-Manuel station shared with the neighboring town of Manuel. After leaving the variant, it arrives at Xátiva, where there is a station serving Renfe Media Distancia trains. At Xativa, the line separates from the Játiva-Alcoy line, which does not have commuter traffic.

The following municipalities along the line are located on the old single-track section, as regional and long-distance traffic diverts onto the variant between Vallada and Xativa. The first municipality with a station in this section is L'Alcudia de Crespins, where the station is located between L'Alcudia de Crespins and the neighboring town of Canals, although it does not bear a combined name.

Next, the line runs alongside the A-35 highway, with a station near its exit 37 in the municipality of Montesa, followed by another station near exit 32 of the same highway in the municipality of Vallada.

Finally, after merging with the Vallada-Xativa variant, the line continues southward for a few kilometers on double tracks until it reaches Moixent, where the commuter line ends at Moixent Station, while the railway line continues towards La Encina.

== History ==
The line was opened for railway traffic in 1862 under the AVT concession (Almansa-Valencia-Tarragona). Between the late 1970s and early 1990s, a variant was created for long-distance and regional trains. In 2009, due to the construction works of the Valencia-Alicante high-speed line, the 18-kilometer section between L'Alcudia de Crespins and Moixent was closed. Since then, an alternative road service has been used.

On May 17, 2019, the section was reopened, discontinuing the alternative road service.

== Expansion plans ==
The construction of a tunnel passing through the city of Valencia is planned, which will allow the C-2 line, as well as others, to access the central station through the northern part of the city. This new station will replace the current Valencia-Nord terminal and will include new stops such as Aragó or Tarongers-Universitats.

The construction of a new station in Albal was completed in 2024. It opened serving lines C-1 and C-2 in February 2025, following the 2024 Spanish floods.

== Services and frequencies ==
The C-2 line offers three types of trains, as it has three possible endpoints in the south: Xativa, L'Alcudia de Crespins, or Moixent. This results in the following frequencies:

- Valencia-Xativa: Every 15 minutes during peak hours or every 20-30 minutes during off-peak hours.
- Xativa-L'Alcudia de Crespins: Every 30 minutes.
- L'Alcudia de Crespins-Moixent: Every hour or every 2 hours.

=== CIVIS ===
The CIVIS trains that run on the C-2 line in a radial direction towards Xativa (3 trains) or L'Alcudia de Crespins (1 train) only make stops at Benifaió-Almussafes, Algemesí, Alzira, Carcaixent, and Xativa.

The trains running in a centripetal direction from Moixent in the morning make stops at Vallada, L'Alcudia de Crespins, Xativa, Carcaixent, Alzira, Algemesí, and Benifaió-Almussafes.
