= List of municipalities in Valencia =

Map of Spain with Valencia highlighted

The 266 municipalities of the province of Valencia.

As of 2023, the province of Valencia or València in the Valencian Community, Spain, is composed of 266 municipalities.

== List ==
Official name	Name in Spanish	Name in co-official language (Valencian)	Population (2023)	Area (km^{2})	Density (2023)	Linguistic area	Comarca	INE code
Ademuz	Ademuz	Ademús	1,004	100.42	9.99	Spanish	Rincón de Ademuz	46001
Ador	Ador		1,699	13.81	123.02	Valencian	Safor	46002
Agullent	Agullent		2,400	16.24	147.78	Valencian	Vall d'Albaida	46004
Aielo de Malferit	Ayelo de Malferit	Aielo de Malferit	4,601	26.74	172.06	Valencian	Vall d'Albaida	46042
Aielo de Rugat	Ayelo de Rugat	Aielo de Rugat	163	7.83	20.81	Valencian	Vall d'Albaida	46043
Alaquàs	Alacuás	Alaquàs	29,825	3.9	7,647.43	Valencian	Horta Oest	46005
Albaida	Albaida		6,102	35.41	172.32	Valencian	Vall d'Albaida	46006
Albal	Albal		17,024	7.33	2,322.51	Valencian	Horta Sud	46007
Albalat de la Ribera	Albalat de la Ribera		3,411	14.35	237.70	Valencian	Ribera Baixa	46008
Albalat dels Sorells	Albalat dels Sorells		4,518	4.62	977.52	Valencian	Horta Nord	46009
Albalat dels Tarongers	Albalat de Taronchers	Albalat dels Tarongers	1,428	21.34	66.91	Valencian	Camp de Morvedre	46010
Alberic	Alberique	Alberic	10,815	26.79	403.69	Valencian	Ribera Alta	46011
Alborache	Alborache	Alboraig	1,389	27.33	50.82	Spanish	Hoya de Buñol	46012
Alboraia / Alboraya	Alboraya	Alboraia	25,792	8.34	3,092.56	Valencian	Horta Nord	46013
Albuixech	Albuixech	Albuixec	4,343	4.42	982.57	Valencian	Horta Nord	46014
Alcàntera de Xúquer	Alcántara de Júcar	Alcàntera de Xúquer	1,414	3.33	424.62	Valencian	Ribera Alta	46016
Alcàsser	Alcácer	Alcàsser	10,575	9	1,175	Valencian	Horta Sud	46015
Alcublas	Alcublas	Les Alcubles	635	43.55	14.58	Spanish	Serranos	46018
L'Alcúdia	La Alcudia	L'Alcúdia	12,197	23.67	515.29	Valencian	Ribera Alta	46019
L'Alcúdia de Crespins	Alcudia de Crespins	L'Alcúdia de Crespins	5,361	5.17	1,036.94	Valencian	Costera	46020
Aldaia	Aldaya	Aldaia	33,376	16.05n	2,079.50	Valencian	Horta Oest	46021
Alfafar	Alfafar		21,879	10.04	2,179.18	Valencian	Horta Sud	46022
Alfara de la Baronia	Alfara de la Baronía	Alfara de la Baronia	611	11.71	52.17	Valencian	Camp de Morvedre	46024
Alfara del Patriarca	Alfara del Patriarca		3,455	1.98	1,744.94	Valencian	Horta Nord	46025
Alfarp	Alfarp	Alfarb	1,618	20.58	78.62	Valencian	Comarca	46026
Alfarrasí	Alfarrasí		1,183	6.38	185.42	Valencian	Vall d'Albaida	46027
Alfauir	Alfahuir	Alfauir	477	6.22	76.68	Valencian	Safor	46023
Algar de Palancia	Algar de Palancia	Algar de Palància	527	13.15	40.07	Valencian	Camp de Morvedre	46028
Algemesí	Algemesí		27,438	41.3	664.35	Valencian	Ribera Alta	46029
Algímia d'Alfara	Algimia de Alfara	Algímia d'Alfara	1,109	14.45	76.74	Valencian	Camp de Morvedre	46030
Alginet	Alginet		14,442	24.07	600	Valencian	Ribera Alta	46031
Almàssera	Almácera	Almàssera	7,504	2.74	2,738.68	Valencian	Horta Nord	46032
Almiserà	Almiserat	Almiserà	279	7.44	37.5	Valencian	Safor	46033
Almoines	Almoines		2,519	2.12	1,188.20	Valencian	Safor	46034
Almussafes	Almusafes	Almussafes	8,996	10.76	836.05	Valencian	Ribera Baixa	46035
Alpuente	Alpuente	Alpont	667	138.33	4.82	Spanish	Serranos	46036
L'Alqueria de la Comtessa	Alquería de la Condesa	L'Alqueria de la Comtessa	1,523	2.15	708.37	Valencian	Safor	46037
Alzira	Alcira	Alzira	46,421	110.49	420.13	Valencian	Ribera Alta	46017
Andilla	Andilla		331	142.58	2.32	Spanish	Serranos	46038
Anna	Anna		2,593	22.45	115.50	Spanish	Canal de Navarrés	46040
Antella	Antella		1,114	17.58	63.36	Valencian	Ribera Alta	46041
Aras de los Olmos	Aras de los Olmos	Ares dels Oms	381	76.04	5.01	Spanish	Serranos	46041
Atzeneta d'Albaida	Adzaneta de Albaida	Atzeneta d'Albaida	1,161	6.06	191.58	Valencian	Vall d'Albaida	46003
Ayora	Ayora	Aiora	5,223	446.58	11.69	Spanish	Valle de Ayora	46044
Barx	Bárig	Barx	1,476	16.1	91.67	Valencian	Safor	46046
Barxeta	Barcheta	Barxeta	1,545	28.52	54.17	Valencian	Costera	46045
Bèlgida	Bélgida	Bèlgida	632	17.26	36.61	Valencian	Vall d'Albaida	46047
Bellreguard	Bellreguard	Bellreguart	4,811	2.85	1,688.07	Valencian	Safor	46048
Bellús	Bellús		306	9.54	32.07	Valencian	Vall d'Albaida	46049
Benagéber	Benagéber	Benaixeve	168	69.82	2.40	Spanish	Serranos	46050
Benaguasil	Benaguacil	Benaguasil	11,877	25.4	467.59	Valencian	Camp de Túria	46051
Benavites	Benavites		674	4.27	157.84	Valencian	Camp de Morvedre	46052
Beneixida	Benegida	Beneixida	655	3.2	204.68	Valencian	Ribera Alta	46053
Benetússer	Benetúser	Benetússer	15,879	0.78	20,357.69	Valencian	Horta Sud	46054
Beniarjó	Beniarjó		1,872	2.75	680.72	Valencian	Safor	46055
Beniatjar	Beniatjar		217	11.37	19.08	Valencian	Vall d'Albaida	46056
Benicolet	Benicolet		599	11.29	53.05	Valencian	Vall d'Albaida	46057
Benicull de Xúquer	Benicull	Benicull de Xúquer	1,134	3.5	324	Valencian	Ribera Baixa	46904
Benifaió	Benifayó	Benifaió	11,984	20.15	594.73	Valencian	Ribera Alta	46060
Benifairó de la Valldigna	Benifairó de la Valldigna		1,554	20.2	76.93	Valencian	Safor	46059
Benifairó de les Valls	Benifairó de les Valls		2,320	4.35	533.33	Valencian	Camp de Morvedre	46058
Beniflá	Beniflá	Beniflà	484	0.62	780.64	Valencian	Safor	46061
Benigànim	Benigánim	Benigànim	5,716	33.44	170.93	Valencian	Vall d'Albaida	46062
Benimodo	Benimodo		2,279	12.52	182.02	Valencian	Ribera Alta	46063
Benimuslem	Benimuslem		665	4.17	159.47	Valencian	Ribera Alta	46064
Beniparrell	Beniparrell		2,074	3.62	572.92	Valencian	Horta Sud	46065
Benirredrà	Benirredrá	Benirredrà	1,571	0.39	4,028.20	Valencian	Safor	46066
Benissanó	Benisanó	Benissanó	2,385	2.25	1,060	Valencian	Camp de Túria	46067
Benissoda	Benisoda	Benissoda	460	4.04	113.86	Valencian	Vall d'Albaida	46068
Benissuera	Benisuera	Benissuera	185	2.12	87.26	Valencian	Vall d'Albaida	46069
Bétera	Bétera		26,759	75.1	356.31	Valencian	Camp de Túria	46070
Bicorp	Bicorb	Bicorp	549	136.5	4.02	Spanish	Canal de Navarrés	46071
Bocairent	Bocairente	Bocairent	4,115	96.98	42.43	Valencian	Vall d'Albaida	46072
Bolbaite	Bolbaite	Bolbait	1,334	40.39	33.02	Spanish	Canal de Navarrés	46073
Bonrepòs i Mirambell	Bonrepós y Mirambell	Bonrepòs i Mirambell	3,907	1.05	3,720.95	Valencian	Horta Nord	46074
Bufali	Bufali		156	3.19	48.90	Valencian	Vall d'Albaida	46075
Bugarra	Bugarra		783	40.31	19.42	Spanish	Serranos	46076
Buñol	Buñol	Bunyol	9,579	112.4	85.22	Spanish	Hoya de Buñol	46077
Burjassot	Burjasot	Burjassot	39,702	3.44	11,541.27	Valencian	Horta Nord	46078
Calles	Calles		431	64.92	6.63	Spanish	Serranos	46079
Camporrobles	Camporrobles		1,181	89.5	13.19	Spanish	Requena-Utiel	46080
Canals	Canals		13,162	21.86	602.10	Valencian	Costera	46081
Canet d'En Berenguer	Canet de Berenguer	Canet d'En Berenguer	7,265	3.95	1,839.64	Valencian	Camp de Morvedre	46082
Carcaixent	Carcagente	Carcaixent	20,777	59.25	350.66	Valencian	Ribera Alta	46083
Càrcer	Cárcer	Càrcer	1,826	7.41	246.42	Valencian	Ribera Alta	46084
Carlet	Carlet		16,141	45.62	353.81	Valencian	Ribera Alta	46085
Carrícola	Carrícola		102	4.6	22.17	Valencian	Vall d'Albaida	46086
Casas Altas	Casas Altas	Cases Altes	146	15.95	9.15	Spanish	Rincón de Ademuz	46087
Casas Bajas	Casas Bajas	Cases Baixes	173	22.65	7.63	Spanish	Rincón de Ademuz	46088
Casinos	Casinos		3,091	41.48	74.51	Valencian	Camp de Túria	46089
Castelló	Villanueva de Castellón	Castelló	6,891	20.3	339.45	Valencian	Ribera Alta	46090
Castelló de Rugat	Castellón de Rugat	Castelló de Rugat	2,322	19.02	122.08	Valencian	Vall d'Albaida	46257
Castellonet de la Conquesta	Castellonet	Castellonet de la Conquesta	149	5.43	27.44	Valencian	Safor	46091
Castielfabib	Castielfabib	Castellfabib	297	106.29	2.79	Spanish	Rincón de Ademuz	46092
Catadau	Catadau		2,939	35.46	82.88	Valencian	Ribera Alta	46093
Catarroja	Catarroja		29,316	13.16	2,227.65	Valencian	Horta Sud	46094
Caudete de las Fuentes	Caudete de las Fuentes		693	34.6	20.02	Spanish	Requena-Utiel	46095
Cerdà	Cerdá	Cerdà	360	1.52	236.84	Valencian	Costera	46096
Chella	Chella	Xella	2,445	43.49	56.21	Spanish	Canal de Navarrés	46107
Chelva	Chelva	Xelva	1,645	190.38	8.64	Spanish	Serranos	46106
Chera	Chera	Xera	483	49.7	9.71	Spanish	Requena-Utiel	46108
Cheste	Cheste	Xest	8,962	71.44	125.44	Spanish	Hoya de Buñol	46109
Chiva	Chiva	Xiva	16,750	178.73	93.71	Spanish	Hoya de Buñol	46111
Chulilla	Chulilla	Xulilla	687	61.78	11.12	Spanish	Serranos	46112
Cofrentes	Cofrentes	Cofrents	1,130	103.18	10.95	Spanish	Valle de Ayora	46097
Corbera	Corbera		3,118	20.27	153.82	Valencian	Ribera Baixa	46098
Cortes de Pallás	Cortes de Pallás	Cortes de Pallars	753	233.01	3.23	Spanish	Valle de Ayora	46099
Cotes	Cotes		314	6.33	49.60	Valencian	Ribera Alta	46100
Cullera	Cullera		23,753	53.82	441.34	Valencian	Ribera Baixa	46105
Daimús	Daimuz	Daimús	3,348	3.15	1,062.85	Spanish	Safor	46113
Domeño	Domeño	Domenyo	684	68.58	9.97	Spanish	Serranos	46114
Dos Aguas	Dos Aguas	Dosaigües	340	121.51	2.79	Spanish	Hoya de Buñol	46115
L'Eliana	La Eliana	L'Eliana	19,054	8.77	2,172.63	Valencian	Camp de Túria	46116
Emperador	Emperador		717	0.03	23,900	Valencian	Horta Nord	46117
Enguera	Enguera		4,718	241.75	19.51	Spanish	Canal de Navarrés	46118
L'Énova	Énova	L'Énova	914	7.67	119.16	Valencian	Ribera Alta	46119
Estivella	Estivella		1,598	20.92	76.38	Valencian	Camp de Morvedre	46120
Estubeny	Estubeny		114	6.42	17.75	Valencian	Costera	46121
Faura	Faura		3,619	1.64	2,206.70	Valencian	Camp de Morvedre	46122
Favara	Favara		2,664	9.45	281.90	Valencian	Ribera Baixa	46123
Foios	Foyos	Foios	7,641	6.48	1,179.16	Valencian	Horta Nord	46126
La Font d'En Carròs	Fuente Encarroz	La Font d'en Carròs	3,858	9.9	389.69	Valencian	Safor	46127
La Font de la Figuera	Fuente la Higuera	La Font de la Figuera	2,031	84.34	24.08	Valencian	Comarca	46128
Fontanars dels Alforins	Fontanares	Fontanars dels Alforins	951	74.69	12.73	Valencian	Vall d'Albaida	46124
Fortaleny	Fortaleny		1,004	4.57	219.69	Valencian	Ribera Baixa	46125
Fuenterrobles	Fuenterrobles		688	49.45	13.91	Spanish	Requena-Utiel	46129
Gandia	Gandía	Gandia	78,108	60.83	1,284.03	Valencian	Safor	46131
Gátova	Gátova	Gàtova	410	30.42	13.47	Spanish	Camp de Túria	46902
Gavarda	Gavarda		1,058	7.99	132.41	Valencian	Ribera Alta	46130
El Genovés	Genovés	El Genovés	2,778	15.16	183.24	Valencian	Costera	46132
Gestalgar	Gestalgar		569	69.73	8.16	Spanish	Serranos	46133
Gilet	Gilet		3,818	11.28	338.47	Valencian	Camp de Morvedre	46134
Godella	Godella		13,414	8.4	1,596.90	Valencian	Horta Nord	46135
Godelleta	Godelleta		4,148	37.45	110.76	Spanish	Hoya de Buñol	46136
La Granja de la Costera	La Granja de la Costera		288	0.83	346.98	Valencian	Costera	46137
Guadasséquies	Guadasequies	Guadasséquies	480	3.26	147.23	Valencian	Vall d'Albaida	46138
Guadassuar	Guadasuar	Guadassuar	5,961	35.29	168.91	Valencian	Ribera Alta	46139
Guardamar de la Safor	Guardamar de la Safor		605	1.1	550	Valencian	Safor	46140
Higueruelas	Higueruelas	Figueroles de Domenyo	522	18.99	27.48	Spanish	Serranos	46141
Jalance	Jalance	Xalans	810	94.77	8.54	Spanish	Valle de Ayora	46142
Jarafuel	Jarafuel	Xarafull	765	103.09	7.42	Spanish	Valle de Ayora	46144
Llanera de Ranes	Llanera de Ranes		1,054	9.27	113.70	Valencian	Costera	46154
Llaurí	Llaurí		1,208	13.63	88.62	Valencian	Ribera Baixa	46155
Llíria	Liria	Llíria	24,518	228.04	107.51	Valencian	Camp de Túria	46147
Llocnou de la Corona	Lugar Nuevo de la Corona	Llocnou de la Corona	124	0.04	3,100	Valencian	Horta Sud	46152
Llocnou de Sant Jeroni	Lugar Nuevo de San Jerónimo	Llocnou de Sant Jeroni	567	6.47	87.63	Valencian	Safor	46153
Llocnou d'En Fenollet	Lugar Nuevo de Fenollet	Llocnou d'En Fenollet	908	1.53	593.46	Valencian	Costera	46151
Llombai	Llombay	Llombai	2,687	55.57	48.35	Valencian	Ribera Alta	46156
La Llosa de Ranes	Llosa de Ranes	La Llosa del Ranes	3,681	7.13	516.26	Valencian	Costera	46157
Llutxent	Luchente	Llutxent	2,324	40.12	57.92	Valencian	Vall d'Albaida	46150
Loriguilla	Loriguilla		2,171	72.42	29.97	Spanish	Camp de Túria	46148
Losa del Obispo	La Losa del Obispo	La Llosa del Bisbe	520	12.17	42.72	Spanish	Serranos	46149
Macastre	Macastre		1,437	37.66	38.15	Spanish	Hoya de Buñol	46158
Manises	Manises		31,573	19.65	1,606.76	Valencian	Horta Oest	46159
Manuel	Manuel		2,500	6.05	413.22	Valencian	Ribera Alta	46160
Marines	Marines		1,955	35.72	54.73	Spanish	Camp de Túria	46161
Massalavés	Masalavés	Massalavés	1,739	7.48	232.48	Valencian	Ribera Alta	46162
Massalfassar	Masalfasar	Massalfassar	2,609	2.56	1,019.14	Valencian	Horta Nord	46163
Massamagrell	Masamagrell	Massamagrell	16,766	6.16	2,721.75	Valencian	Horta Nord	46164
Massanassa	Masanasa	Massanassa	10,146	5.59	1,815.02	Valencian	Horta Sud	46165
Meliana	Meliana		10,918	4.73	2,308.24	Valencian	Horta Nord	46166
Millares	Millares		330	105.51	3.12	Spanish	Canal de Navarrés	46167
Miramar	Miramar		2,978	2.56	1,163.28	Valencian	Safor	46168
Mislata	Mislata		45,644	2.03	22,397.04	Valencian	Horta Oest	46169
Moixent / Mogente	Mogente	Moixent	4,383	150.23	29.17	Valencian	Costera	46170
Moncada	Moncada	Montcada	22,067	15.83	1,393.99	Valencian	Horta Nord	46171
Montaverner	Montaberner	Montaverner	1,617	7.4	218.51	Valencian	Vall d'Albaida	46173
Montesa	Montesa		1,132	48.11	23.52	Valencian	Costera	46174
Montitxelvo / Montichelvo	Montichelvo	Montitxelvo	558	8.16	68.38	Valencian	Vall d'Albaida	46175
Montroy / Montroi	Montroy	Montroi	3,295	31.39	104.96	Valencian	Ribera Alta	46176
Montserrat	Monserrat	Montserrat	9,312	45.58	204.30	Valencian	Ribera Alta	46172
Museros	Museros		6,741	12.45	541.44	Valencian	Horta Nord	46177
Nàquera / Náquera	Náquera	Nàquera	8,102	38.72	209.24	Valencian	Camp de Túria	46178
Navarrés	Navarrés		3,061	47.04	65.07	Spanish	Canal de Navarrés	46179
Novetlè / Novelé	Novelé	Novetlè	856	1.47	582.31	Valencian	Costera	46180
Oliva	Oliva		25,558	59.93	426.46	Valencian	Safor	46181
L'Olleria	Ollería	L'Olleria	8,421	32.22	261.35	Valencian	Vall d'Albaida	46183
Olocau	Olocau		2,303	37.4	61.57	Valencian	Camp de Túria	46182
Ontinyent	Onteniente	Ontinyent	36,194	125.43	288.55	Valencian	Vall d'Albaida	46184
Otos	Otos		436	11.07	39.38	Valencian	Vall d'Albaida	46185
Paiporta	Paiporta		27,184	3.96	6,864.64	Valencian	Horta Sud	46186
Palma de Gandía	Palma de Gandía	Palma de Gandia	1,735	13.92	124.64	Valencian	Safor	46187
Palmera	Palmera		1,043	0.98	1,064.28	Valencian	Safor	46188
El Palomar	El Palomar		574	7.76	73.96	Valencian	Vall d'Albaida	46189
Paterna	Paterna		73,488	35.85	2,049.87	Valencian	Horta Oest	46190
Pedralba	Pedralba		3,048	58.85	51.79	Valencian	Serranos	46191
Petrés	Petrés		1,096	1.87	586.09	Valencian	Camp de Morvedre	46192
Picanya	Picaña	Picanya	11,760	7.2	1,633.33	Valencian	Horta Oest	46193
Picassent	Picasent	Picassent	22,236	85.79	259.19	Valencian	Horta Sud	46194
Piles	Piles		3,031	3.94	769.28	Valencian	Safor	46195
Pinet	Pinet		155	11.89	13.03	Valencian	Vall d'Albaida	46196
La Pobla de Farnals	Puebla de Farnals	La Pobla de Farnals	8,699	3.62	2,403.03	Valencian	Horta Nord	46199
La Pobla de Vallbona	Puebla de Vallbona	La Pobla de Vallbona	26,435	33.1	798.64	Valencian	Camp de Túria	46202
La Pobla del Duc	Puebla del Duc	La Pobla del Duc	2,438	18.87	129.19	Valencian	Vall d'Albaida	46200
La Pobla Llarga	Puebla Larga	La Pobla Llarga	4,529	10.09	448.86	Valencian	Ribera Alta	46203
Polinyà de Xúquer	Poliñá de Júcar	Polinyà de Xúquer	2,550	9.18	277.77	Valencian	Ribera Baixa	46197
Potries	Potríes	Potries	1,080	3.07	351.79	Valencian	Safor	46198
Puçol	Puzol	Puçol	20,731	18.1	1,145.35	Valencian	Horta Nord	46205
Puebla de San Miguel	Puebla de San Miguel	La Pobla de Sant Miquel	53	63.58	0.83	Spanish	Rincón de Ademuz	46201
El Puig de Santa Maria	El Puig de Santa María	El Puig de Santa Maria	8,992	26.8	335.52	Valencian	Horta Nord	46204
Quart de les Valls	Cuart de les Valls	Quart de les Valls	1,050	8.43	124.55	Valencian	Camp de Morvedre	46101
Quart de Poblet	Cuart de Poblet	Quart de Poblet	25,590	19.72	1,297.66	Valencian	Horta Oest	46102
Quartell	Cuartell	Quartell	1,672	3.18	525.78	Valencian	Camp de Morvedre	46103
Quatretonda	Cuatretonda	Quatretonda	2,190	43.45	50.40	Valencian	Vall d'Albaida	46104
Quesa	Quesa		661	73.16	9.03	Spanish	Canal de Navarrés	46206
Rafelbunyol	Rafelbuñol	Rafelbunyol	9,467	4.2	2,254.04	Valencian	Horta Nord	46207
Rafelcofer	Rafelcofer		1,372	2.03	675.86	Valencian	Safor	46208
Rafelguaraf	Rafelguaraf		2,351	16.26	144.58	Valencian	Ribera Alta	46209
Ráfol de Salem	Ráfol de Salem	El Ràfol de Salem	467	4.33	107.85	Valencian	Vall d'Albaida	46210
Real	Real		2,410	18.32	131.55	Valencian	Ribera Alta	46212
El Real de Gandia	Real de Gandía	El Real de Gandia	2,649	6.07	436.40	Valencian	Safor	46211
Requena	Requena		20,387	814.4	25.03	Spanish	Requena-Utiel	46213
Riba-roja de Túria	Ribarroja del Turia	Riba-roja de Túria	23,555	57.49	409.72	Valencian	Camp de Túria	46214
Riola	Riola		1,780	5.59	318.42	Valencian	Ribera Baixa	46215
Rocafort	Rocafort		7,570	2.34	3,235.04	Valencian	Horta Nord	46216
Rotglà i Corberà	Rotglá y Corbera		1,165	6.26	186.10	Valencian	Costera	46217
Ròtova	Rótova	Ròtova	1,292	7.66	168.66	Valencian	Safor	46218
Rugat	Rugat		166	3.2	51.87	Valencian	Vall d'Albaida	46219
Sagunt / Sagunto	Sagunto	Sagunt	70,128	133.92	523.65	Valencian	Camp de Morvedre	46220
Salem	Salem		401	8.61	46.57	Valencian	Vall d'Albaida	46221
San Antonio de Benagéber	San Antonio de Benagéber	Sant Antoni de Benaixeve	10,200	8.74	1,167.04	Spanish	Camp de Túria	46903
Sant Joanet	San Juan de Énova	Sant Joanet	544	1.86	292.47	Valencian	Ribera Alta	46222
Sedaví	Sedaví		10,637	1.83	5,812.56	Valencian	Horta Sud	46223
Segart	Segart		166	6.64	25	Valencian	Camp de Morvedre	46224
Sellent	Sellent		381	14.01	27.19	Valencian	Ribera Alta	46225
Sempere	Sempere		31	3.83	8.09	Valencian	Vall d'Albaida	46226
Senyera	Señera	Senyera	1,122	2.03	552.70	Valencian	Ribera Alta	46227
Serra	Serra		3,608	57.29	62.97	Valencian	Camp de Túria	46228
Siete Aguas	Siete Aguas	Setaigües	1,229	110.59	11.11	Spanish	Hoya de Buñol	46229
Silla	Silla		19,683	25.02	786.69	Valencian	Horta Sud	46230
Simat de la Valldigna	Simat de Valldigna	Simat de la Valldigna	3,251	38.49	84.46	Valencian	Safor	46231
Sinarcas	Sinarcas		1,113	102.46	10.86	Spanish	Requena-Utiel	46232
Sollana	Sollana		4,959	39.23	126.40	Valencian	Ribera Baixa	46233
Sot de Chera	Sot de Chera	Sot de Xera	423	38.75	10.91	Spanish	Serranos	46234
Sueca	Sueca		28,086	92.52	303.56	Valencian	Ribera Baixa	46235
Sumacàrcer	Sumacárcel	Sumacàrcer	1,062	20.09	52.86	Valencian	Ribera Alta	46236
Tavernes Blanques	Tabernes Blanques	Tavernes Blanques	9,456	0.74	12,778.37	Valencian	Horta Nord	46237
Tavernes de la Valldigna	Tabernes de Valldigna	Tavernes de la Valldigna	17,443	49.23	354.31	Valencian	Safor	46238
Teresa de Cofrentes	Teresa de Cofrentes	Teresa de Cofrents	611	110.8	5.51	Spanish	Valle de Ayora	46239
Terrateig	Terrateig		291	6.32	46.04	Valencian	Vall d'Albaida	46240
Titaguas	Titaguas	Titaigües	505	63.21	7.98	Spanish	Serranos	46241
Torrebaja	Torrebaixa	Torrebaixa	404	4.72	85.59	Spanish	Rincón de Ademuz	46242
Torrella	Torrella		143	1.14	125.43	Valencian	Costera	46243
Torrent	Torrente	Torrent	87,295	69.23	1,260.94	Valencian	Horta Oest	46244
Torres Torres	Torres Torres		745	11.77	63.29	Valencian	Camp de Morvedre	46245
Tous	Tous		1,352	127.52	10.60	Valencian	Ribera Alta	46246
Tuéjar	Tuéjar	Toixa	1,201	121.92	9.85	Spanish	Serranos	46247
Turís	Turís		7,259	80.51	90.16	Valencian	Ribera Alta	46248
Utiel	Utiel		11,632	236.91	49.09	Spanish	Requena-Utiel	46249
València	Valencia	València	807,693	139.31	5,797.81	Valencian	Horta de València	46250
Vallada	Vallada		3,063	61.5	49.80	Valencian	Costera	46251
Vallanca	Vallanca		144	56.61	2.54	Spanish	Rincón de Ademuz	46252
Vallés	Vallés		151	1,24	121.77	Valencian	Costera	46253
Venta del Moro	Venta del Moro		1,164	272.19	4.27	Spanish	Requena-Utiel	46254
Vilallonga / Villalonga	Villalonga	Vilallonga	4,667	43.32	107.73	Valencian	Safor	46255
Vilamarxant	Villamarchante	Vilamarxant	10,772	71.08	151.54	Valencian	Camp de Túria	46256
Villar del Arzobispo	Villar del Arzobispo	El Villar	3,700	40.7	90.90	Spanish	Serranos	46258
Villargordo del Cabriel	Villargordo del Cabriel		577	71.61	8.05	Spanish	Requena-Utiel	46259
Vinalesa	Vinalesa		3,495	1.53	2,284.31	Valencian	Horta Nord	46260
Xàtiva	Játiva	Xàtiva	30,072	76.56	392.78	Valencian	Costera	46145
Xeraco	Jaraco	Xeraco	5,923	20.22	292.92	Valencian	Safor	46143
Xeresa	Jeresa	Xeresa	2,263	16.85	134.30	Valencian	Safor	46146
Xirivella	Chirivella	Xirivella	30,749	5.13	5,993.95	Valencian	Horta Oest	46110
Yátova	Yátova	Iàtova	2,205	129.24	17.06	Spanish	Hoya de Buñol	46261
La Yesa	La Yesa	La Iessa	235	84.68	2.77	Spanish	Serranos	46262
Zarra	Zarra		364	49.72	7.32	Spanish	Valle de Ayora	46263

== See also ==
- Geography of Spain
- List of cities in Spain
