= Rober Sierra =

Spanish footballer (born 1996)

Personal information
- Full name: Roberto Manuel Sierra Giménez
- Date of birth: 21 May 1996 (age 30)
- Place of birth: Novetlè, Spain
- Height: 1.81 m (5 ft 11 in)
- Position: Midfielder

Team information
- Current team: Argeş Piteşti
- Number: 27

Youth career
- –2016: Levante
- 2016: → Mallorca (loan)

Senior career*
Years	Team	Apps	(Gls)
2016	Levante B	0	(0)
2016	→ Mallorca B (loan)	3	(0)
2016–2018	Ontinyent	63	(1)
2018–2019	Peralada	35	(0)
2019–2021	Oviedo B	47	(2)
2021–2022	Formentera	32	(0)
2022	Inter Turku	14	(0)
2023	Spartak Varna	17	(0)
2023–2025	CSA Steaua București	53	(3)
2025–	Argeş Piteşti	48	(4)
- * Club domestic league appearances and goals as of 6 November 2026

Roberto Manuel Sierra Giménez (born 21 May 1996) known as Rober Sierra, is a Spanish professional footballer who plays as a midfielder for Liga I club Argeş Piteşti.

== Career ==
Rober started his youth career with Levante. In 2015 he was promoted to Atlético Levante, but in January 2016 he was sent on loan to Mallorca B until the end of the season. In the summer of 2016 he returned in Levente, but later decided to leave the team and join Ontinyent in Segunda División B. After spending two seasons with the team he was transferred in Peralada for a season, before joining Real Oviedo II. In the summer of 2021 he moved to Formentera.

On 20 June 2022, he moved to Finland and joined Veikkausliiga club Inter Turku on a 1+1 year contract.

In January 2023 Rober signed with the Bulgarian First League team Spartak Varna.

== Career statistics ==
As of 6 November 2026.

Appearances and goals by club, season and competition
Club	Season	League			National cup (Note: Includes Suomen Cup, Bulgarian Cup and Cupa României)		Other		Total	
Club	Season	Division	Apps	Goals	Apps	Goals	Apps	Goals	Apps	Goals
Mallorca B	2015–16	Tercera División	3	0	—		—		3	0
Ontinyent	2016–17	Tercera División	38	0	—		6	0	44	0
Ontinyent	2017–18	Segunda División B	25	1	—		14 (Note: Appearances in Copa Federación)	0	39	1
Ontinyent	Total		63	1	—		20	0	83	1
Peralada	2018–19	Segunda División B	35	0	—		1 (Note: Appearance in Copa Catalunya)	0	36	0
Oviedo B	2019–20	Segunda División B	22	2	—		—		22	2
Oviedo B	2020–21	Segunda División B	25	0	—		—		25	0
Oviedo B	Total		47	2	—		—		47	2
Formentera	2021–22	Segunda Federación	32	0	—		—		32	0
Inter Turku	2022	Veikkausliiga	14	0	2	0	—		16	0
Spartak Varna	2022–23	Bulgarian First League	17	0	1	0	—		18	0
CSA Steaua București	2023–24	Liga II	24	2	4	0	—		28	2
CSA Steaua București	2024–25	Liga II	29	1	0	0	—		29	1
CSA Steaua București	Total		53	3	4	0	—		57	3
Argeş Piteşti	2025–26	Liga I	40	3	4	0	—		44	3
Argeş Piteşti	2026–27	Liga I	8	1	1	0	—		9	1
Argeş Piteşti	Total		48	4	5	0	—		53	4
Career total			312	10	12	0	21	0	345	10

== Honours ==
Ontinyent

- Copa Federación runner-up: 2017–18

Inter Turku

- Suomen Cup runner-up: 2022
