= Montesa =

Montesa may refer to:

- Montesa Honda, a Spanish motorcycle manufacturer
- Order of Montesa, a Christian military order
- Montesa, Valencia, Spain
