= Llocnou d'En Fenollet =

- Municipality
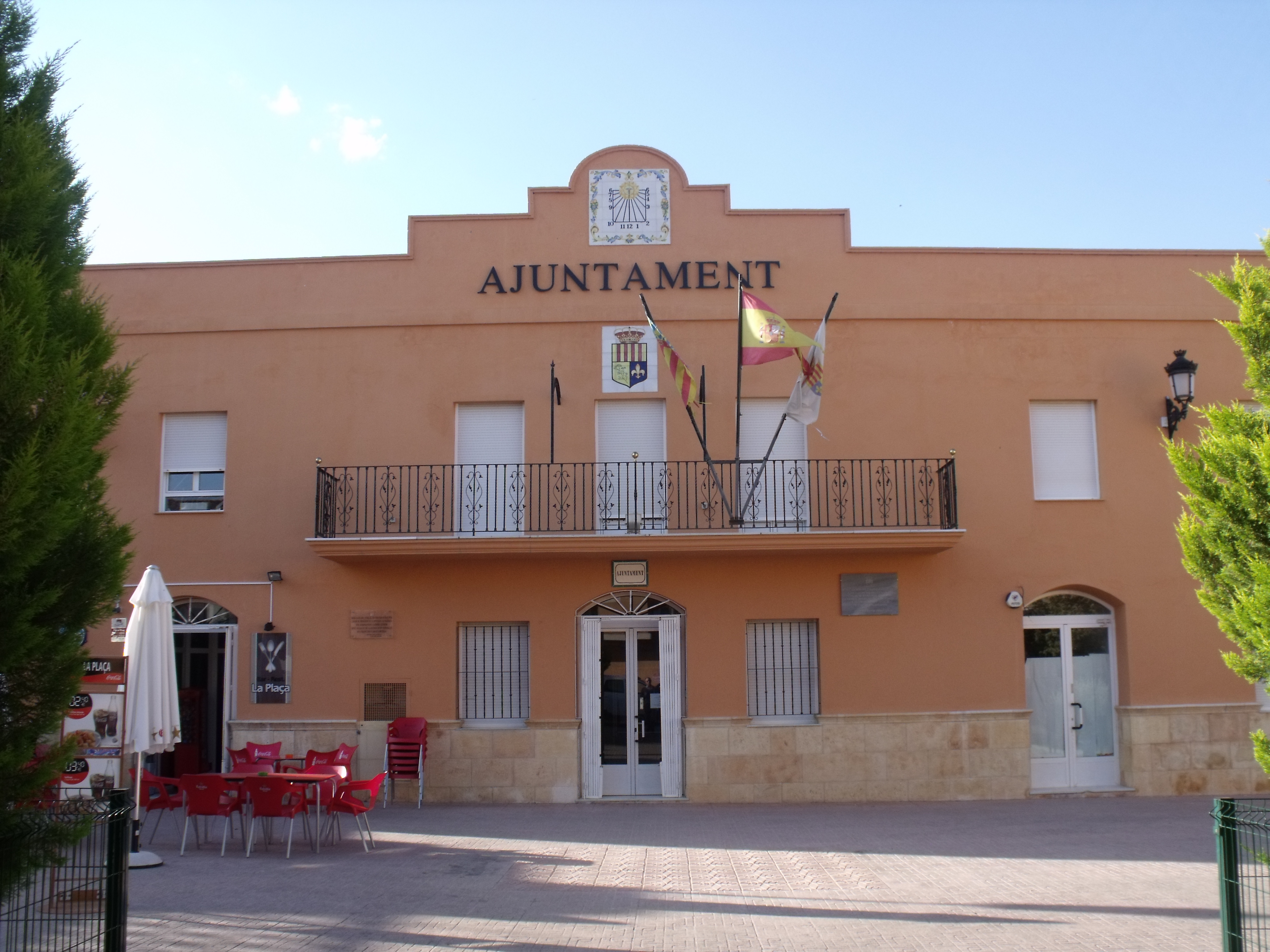
- Town hall

- Coat of arms

- Location in Spain
- Coordinates: 39°0′50″N 0°28′4″W
- Country: Spain
- Autonomous community: Valencian Community
- Province: Valencia
- Comarca: Costera
- Judicial district: Xàtiva

Government
  - Alcalde: Francisco Sanz Ortega

Area
  - Total: 1.5 km^{2} (0.58 sq mi)
- Elevation: 75 m (246 ft)

Population (2025-01-01)
  - Total: 944
  - Density: 630/km^{2} (1,600/sq mi)
- Demonym: Llocnouino/a
- Time zone: UTC+1 (CET)
  - Summer (DST): UTC+2 (CEST)
- Postal code: 46668
- Official language(s): Valencian
- Website: Official website

Llocnou d'En Fenollet is a municipality in the comarca of Costera in the Valencian Community, Spain.

== See also ==
- List of municipalities in Valencia
