= Rosita Rodrigo =

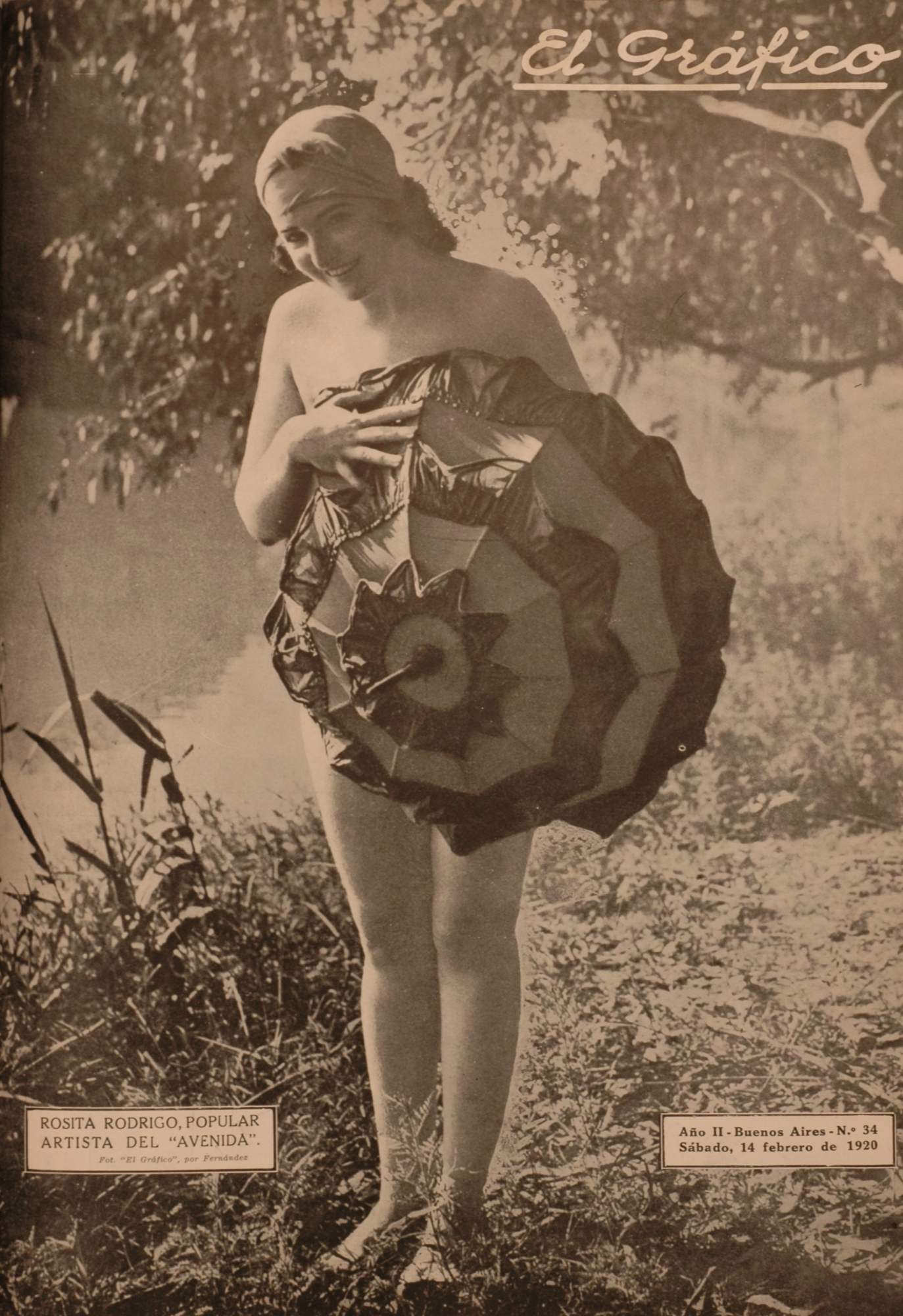
- Rosita Rodrigo (El Gráfico, 1920)
- Born: Rosa de Lima Rodrigo Gómez; 5 January 1891; La Llosa de Ranes, Spain
- Died: 1 April 1959; Barcelona, Spain
- Occupations: actress; vedette; dancer; songwriter
- Notable work: "Les barraques"; "Muñequita de trapo"

Rosita Rodrigo (La Llosa de Ranes, 5 January 1891 – Barcelona, 1 April 1959) was a Spanish actress, vedette, dancer and songwriter, highly successful in Spain, Mexico, Cuba, and Argentina. Among her most popular songs are the Valencian zarzuela, "Les barraques" and "Muñequita de trapo." She was also linked to politics, such as her relationship with Alfonso XIII.

== Biography ==
Rosa de Lima Rodrigo Gómez was born on 5 January 1891 in La Llosa de Ranes, Valencia. She studied singing in Italy and sang in the first opera houses as first vedette. In 1917, she agreed to make her debut as a cuplé singer in Barcelona after the scandal that arose when a painter in love with her murdered the son of the Counts of Villamar for her love, forcing her to leave Valencia to make her debut at the Palace in Madrid. She then worked at the Edén Concert music hall hired by Fernando Bayés where she premiered zarzuelas by Jacinto Guerrero and in 1922, with the Eulogio Velasco company she premiered Arco iris, the most ostentatious revue of her time. In 1926, she made her debut at the Teatro Cómico de Barcelona with the Manolo Sugrañes company, premiering Joy Joy. In 1949, with Luis Escobar Kirkpatrick, Rodrigo premiered the work Electra.

In Barcelona, she was a close friend of Josep Maria de Sagarra. She was in a relationship with the dictator Miguel Primo de Rivera. During 1929, Rodrigo was an entrepreneur of the Tablao of the International Exhibition in Montjuïc, "El Patio del Farolillo" where many flamenco artists debuted. She also worked as a singing teacher at the Royal Conservatory of Valencia.

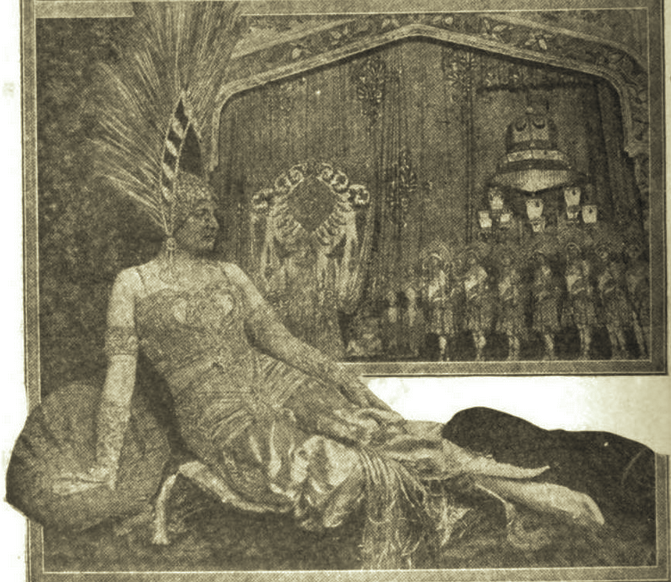
Rosita Rodrigo (Variedades, 1924)

Rodrigo is considered by many historians as one of the pioneers of the "vedettes" of Spanish origin who achieved success abroad. She paraded through studios in Paris, London, and Berlin to make films in Spanish like other theater actors and actresses such as Rosario Pino, Carmen Ruiz Moragas, Isabel Barrón, Imperio Argentina, and Florindo Ferrario, among others. She came to Buenos Aires for the first time in 1919. In Argentina, she performed at the Teatro General San Martín along with other stars of the era such as Azucena Maizani, Tomás Simari, Carlos Morganti, and musicians such as Francisco Payá and Manuel Coll. In this country, she made the "Terceto de las rates" of La Gran Vía (1922), performed together with Miguel Lamas, Gabriela Besanzoni, Taurino Parvis, and Ignacio León, and Las horas del amor (1932) with the comedian Roberto García Ramos and the magician Mister London and their dwarves.

In Rodrigo's company, on 14 May 1920, Tita Merello made her debut in the play Las vírgenes de Teres, at the Avenida Theatre, after an actress from Rodrigo's cast suffered from pneumonia. Rodrigo toured as an operetta singer on "Radio de la Ciudad" (Buenos Aires). In 1939, Rodrigo served as a costume designer in the film Gente bien, directed by Manuel Romero, along with Hugo del Carril, Tito Lusiardo, and Delia Garcés.

She died in Barcelona on 2 April 1959, and is buried in Barcelona's Sant Andreu Cemetery.
