= Rotglà i Corberà =

- Municipality
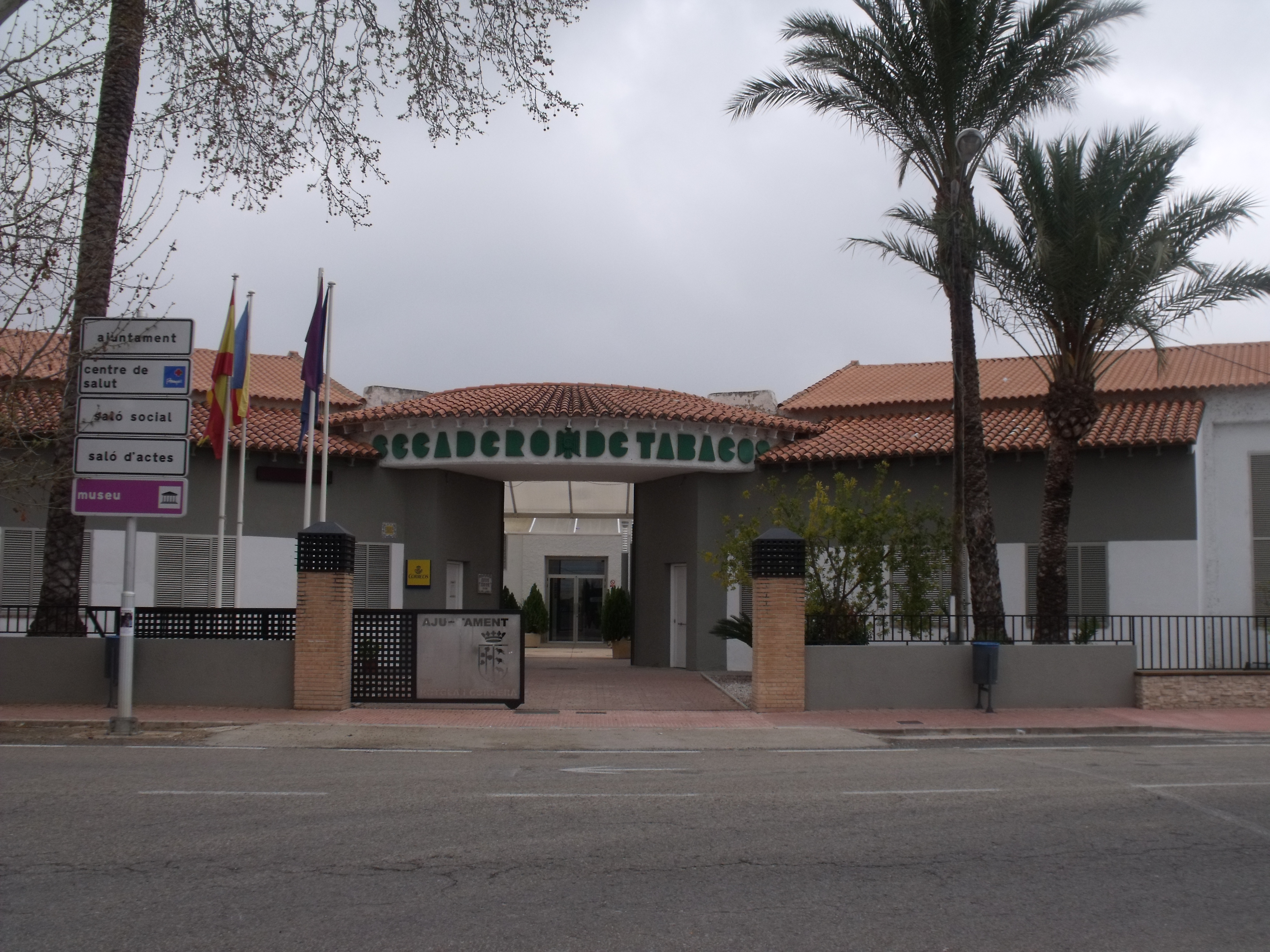

- Coat of arms

- Location in Spain
- Coordinates: 39°0′14″N 0°33′55″W
- Country: Spain
- Autonomous community: Valencian Community
- Province: Valencia
- Comarca: Costera
- Judicial district: Xàtiva
- Founded: 1611

Government
  - Alcalde: Mercedes Castelló García

Area
  - Total: 6.2 km^{2} (2.4 sq mi)
- Elevation: 118 m (387 ft)

Population (2025-01-01)
  - Total: 1,171
  - Density: 190/km^{2} (490/sq mi)
- Demonym: Rotglanero/a
- Time zone: UTC+1 (CET)
  - Summer (DST): UTC+2 (CEST)
- Postal code: 46816
- Official language(s): Valencian
- Website: Official website

Rotglà i Corberà (Valencian: [roɡˈɡlaj koɾbeˈɾa]) is a municipality in the comarca of Costera in Valencia, Spain.

== See also ==
- List of municipalities in Valencia
