= La Llosa de Ranes =

- Municipality
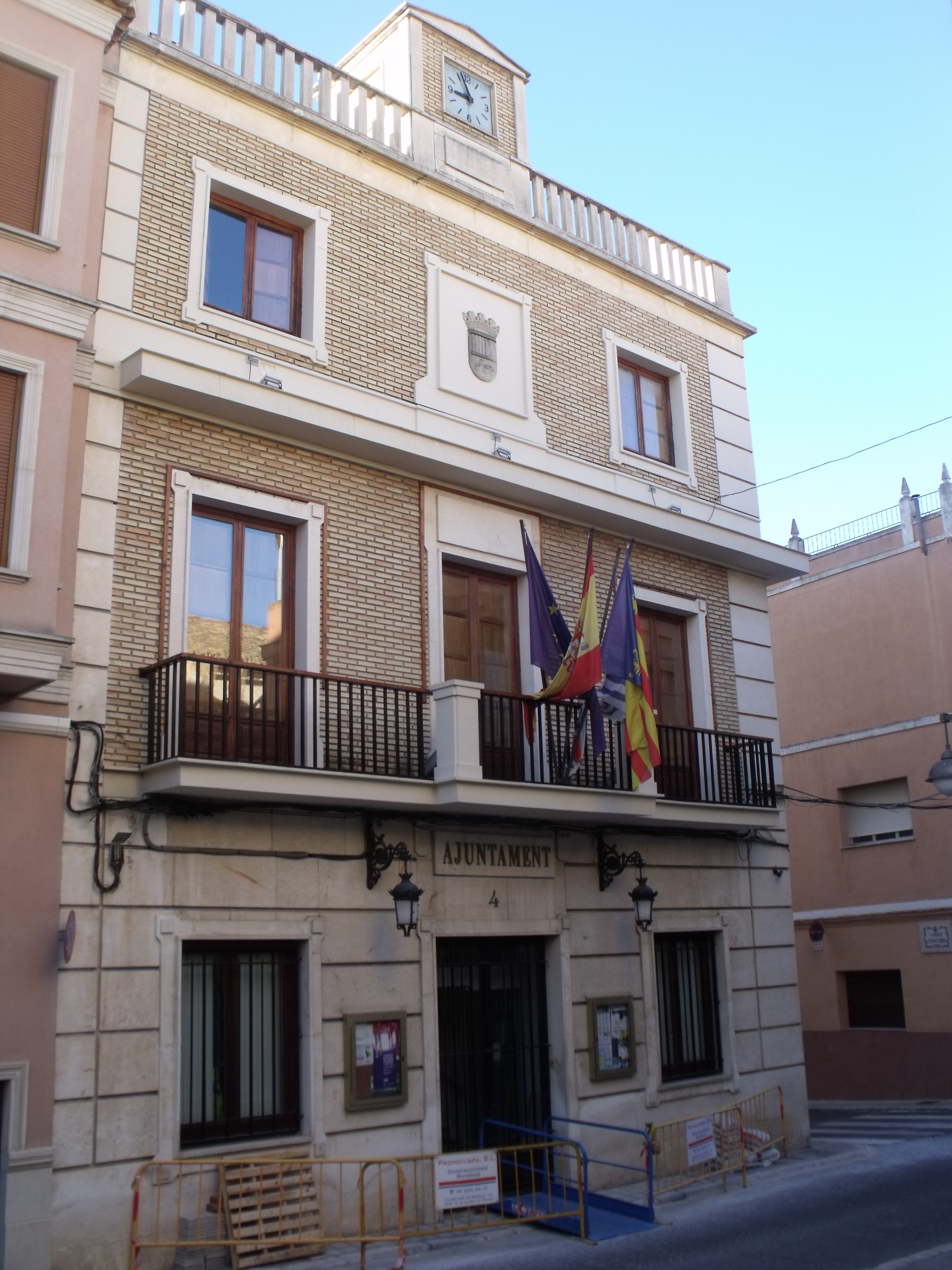
- Town hall

- Flag Coat of arms

- Location in Spain
- Coordinates: 39°1′7″N 0°32′1″W
- Country: Spain
- Autonomous community: Valencian Community
- Province: Valencia
- Comarca: Costera
- Judicial district: Xàtiva

Government
  - Alcalde: Evarist Aznar Teruel

Area
  - Total: 7.1 km^{2} (2.7 sq mi)
- Elevation: 106 m (348 ft)

Population (2025-01-01)
  - Total: 3,765
  - Density: 530/km^{2} (1,400/sq mi)
- Demonym(s): Lloser, llosera
- Time zone: UTC+1 (CET)
  - Summer (DST): UTC+2 (CEST)
- Postal code: 46815
- Official language(s): Valencian
- Website: Official website

La Llosa de Ranes (Valencian pronunciation: [la ˈʎɔza ðe ˈranes], locally [la ˈʎɔzɔ ðe ˈranes]) is a municipality in the comarca of Costera in the Valencian Community, Spain.

== Notable people ==
- Rosita Rodrigo (1891–1959), actress, vedette, dancer, and songwriter

== See also ==
- List of municipalities in Valencia
