= Barxeta =

Barxeta Barxeta (Valencian) Barcheta (Spanish)
- Municipality
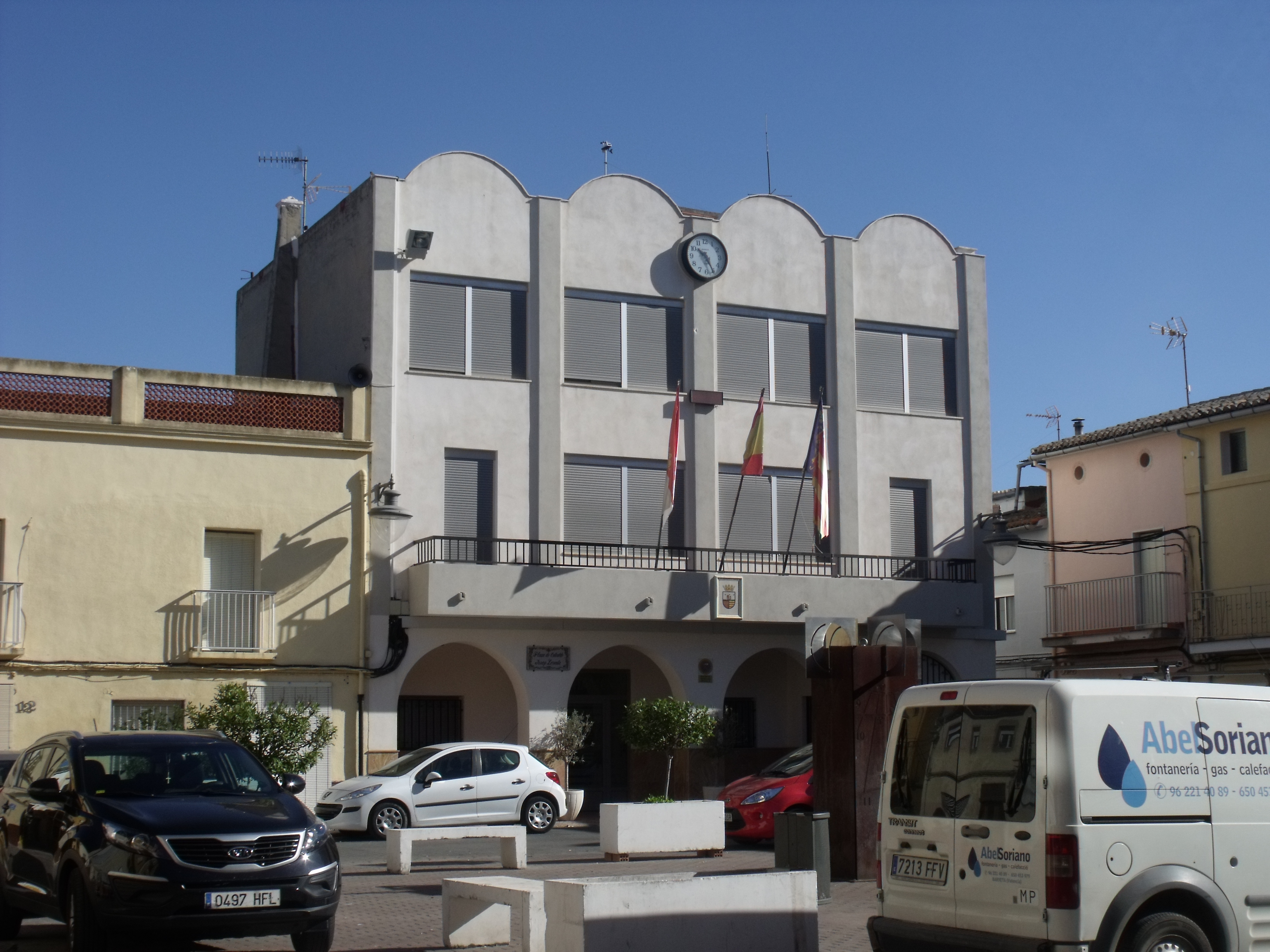
- Town hall

- Flag Coat of arms

- Location in Spain
- Coordinates: 39°1′16″N 0°24′57″W
- Country: Spain
- Autonomous community: Valencian Community
- Province: Valencia
- Comarca: Costera
- Judicial district: Xàtiva

Government
  - Alcalde: Vicent Antoni Giner i Segarra (EUPV)

Area
  - Total: 28.5 km^{2} (11.0 sq mi)
- Elevation: 93 m (305 ft)

Population (2025-01-01)
  - Total: 1,578
  - Density: 55.4/km^{2} (143/sq mi)
- Demonym: Barchetano/a
- Time zone: UTC+1 (CET)
  - Summer (DST): UTC+2 (CEST)
- Postal code: 46667
- Official language(s): Valencian
- Website: Official website

Barxeta (Valencian: [baɾˈtʃeta]; Spanish: Barcheta [baɾˈtʃeta]) is a municipality in the comarca of Costera in the Valencian Community, Spain.

== See also ==
- List of municipalities in Valencia
