= Almiserà =

- Municipality
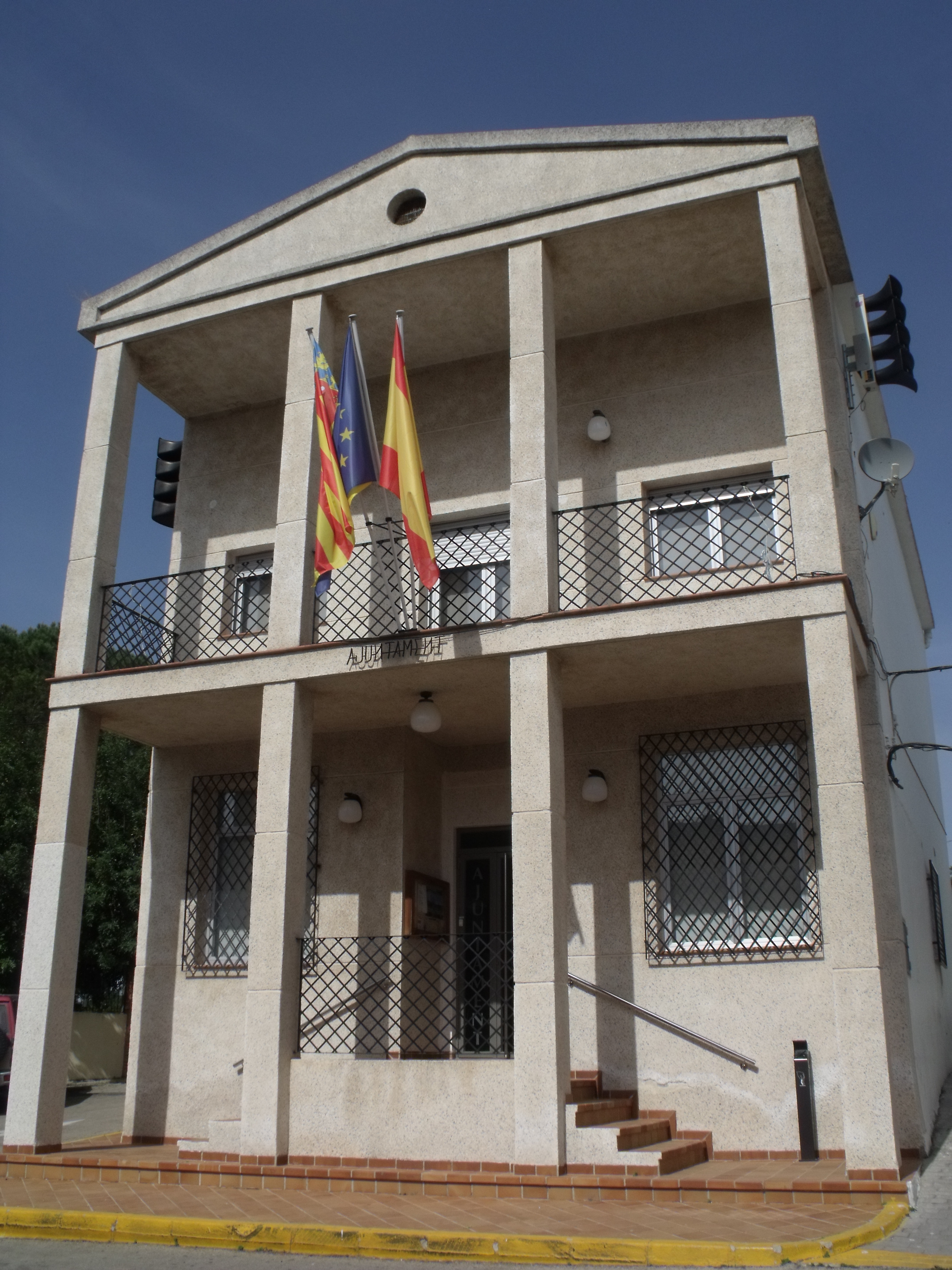
- Town hall

- Coat of arms

- Location in Spain
- Coordinates: 38°54′55″N 0°17′6″W
- Country: Spain
- Autonomous community: Valencian Community
- Province: Valencia
- Comarca: Safor
- Judicial district: Gandia

Government
  - Alcalde: Pau Canet Banyuls (Compromís)

Area
  - Total: 7.4 km^{2} (2.9 sq mi)
- Elevation: 75 m (246 ft)

Population (2025-01-01)
  - Total: 278
  - Density: 38/km^{2} (97/sq mi)
- Demonyms: Almiseratí, almiseratina
- Time zone: UTC+1 (CET)
  - Summer (DST): UTC+2 (CEST)
- Postal code: 46726
- Official language(s): Valencian
- Website: https://www.almisera.es

Almiserà (Valencian: [almizeˈɾa]; Spanish: Almiserat [almiseˈɾat]) is a municipality located in the southern foothills of the Buixcarró mountain range in the Safor comarca of Spain's Valencian Community. 14 km inland from the Mediterranean coastal town of Gandia, it can be reached from Valencia via the N-332, CV-686 and the CV-60 roads.

The climate is mild with a prevalence of easterly and westerly winds, the former providing the rainfall that keeps the terrain fertile. The village is situated on the left bank of the river Vernisa, on a small hillock surrounded by mountains with numerous natural springs and opportunities for ecotourists.

Places of interest include the remains of Vilella Castle, the Parish Church of the Nativity of Our Lady, the traditional municipal washhouse and a watermill which was still in use as recently as the late fifties. There is also the nearby 14th century Monastery of Sant Jeroni de Cotalba which forms part of the Valencian "Ruta de Los Monasterios" tour.

The principal village fiestas, traditionally lasting four days, are held during the last week in August, the last day coinciding with the last Saturday of the month:

- Day 1: La Vespra. The start of the fiestas.
- Day 2: El dia de l’Ajuntament, organized by the town council and dedicated to the village's patron saint, St. Ursula.
- Day 3: El dia dels festers jóvens, organized by a group of young people from the village and dedicated to the Immaculate Conception.
- Day 4: El dia dels festers casats, organized by a group of married couples and dedicated to the Christ of Refuge.

Additional fiestas are held in honour of Saint Ursula on 21 October and in honour of Saint Anthony on 17 January.

== See also ==
- List of municipalities in Valencia
