= Oratory of the Borgias =

- Oratory of the Borgias
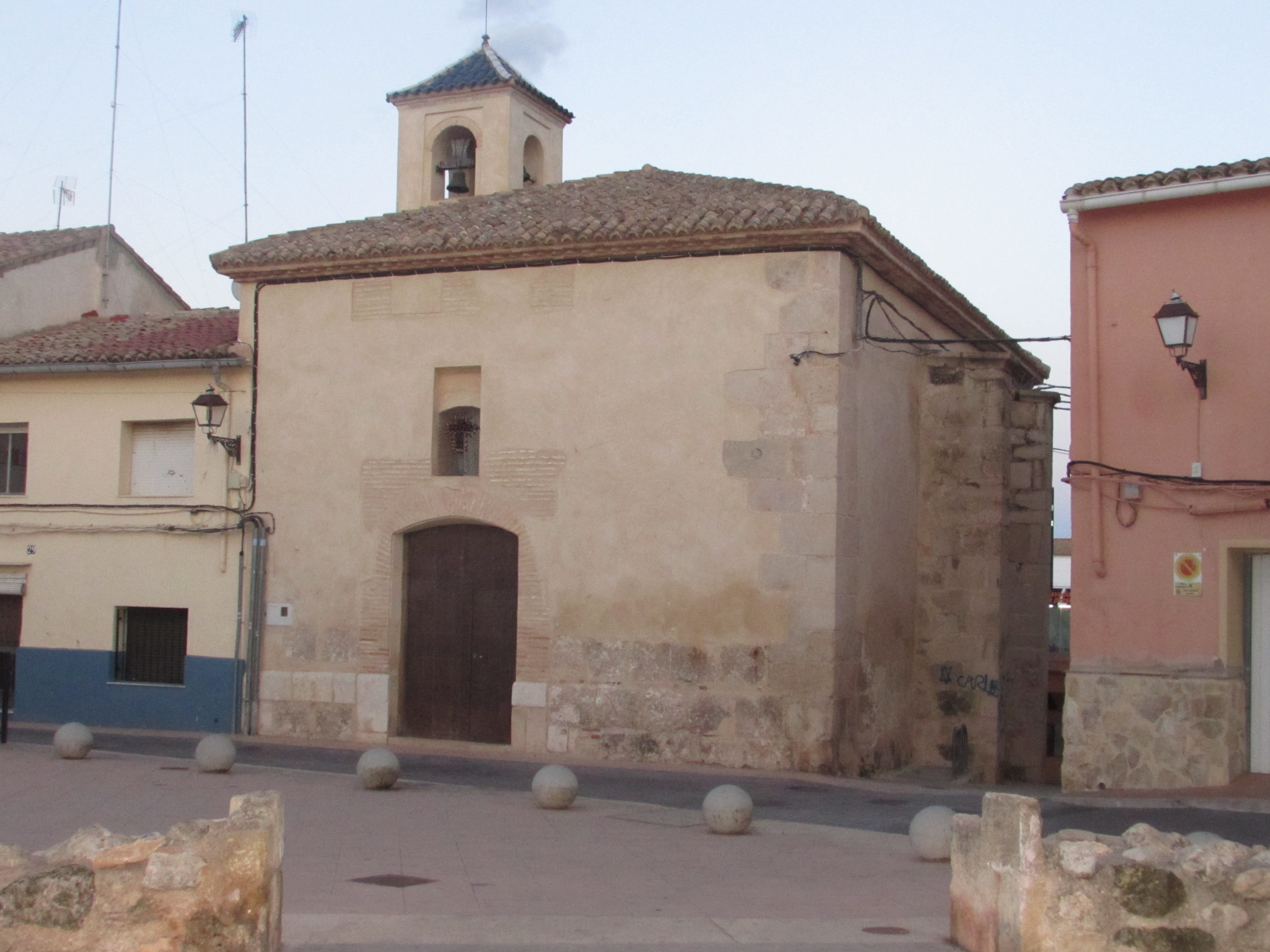
- Oratory of the Borgias
- Oratory of the Borgias
- 38°58′1.07″N 0°10′48.84″W
- Location: Canals (Valencia)
- Country: Spain
- Denomination: Roman Catholic

History
- Founded: 13th century

Architecture
- Style: Valencian Gothic

Administration
- Diocese: Valencia

The Oratory of the Borgias or Church of the Tower is located in the municipality of Canals (Valencia), Spain. It is a church built in early Valencian Gothic style, probably in the 13th century.

It is located in front of the Borgias Tower and has been reformed on several occasions. In the oratory is conserved a medieval table about the Last Judgment, attributed to the Master of Borbotó. In the oratory was kept a shield with the arms of the House of Borgia which was lost after the intervention of 1878. Originally, it was part of the palace complex of the Borgias at their ancestral power base in the Señorío de Torre de Canals.

The original invocation of the oratory was the True Cross. The building consists of a single nave's rectangular, flat head, walls of stone and mortar, covered gabled sustained by two diaphragm arches supported by pillars. The roof was partially of wood. The original major altar was lost during the Spanish Civil War. It is believed that at one of the tables of the major altar, it was represented the True Cross, a gift of the Pope Callixtus III, according to the historical tradition.

== Bibliography ==
- CEBRIÁN Y MOLINA, J.L.: L’oratori i la torrassa del Palau dels Borja a la Torre de Canals, Ayuntamiento de Canals, 1990.
- LA PARRA LÓPEZ, S.: La ruta valenciana de los Borja, Gandía, Escapada-Punto Cero, 1997.
- MARTÍ DOMÍNGUEZ: Els Borja, Gandía, CEIC ”Alfons el Vell”, 1985.
- VV.AA.: Los Borja: del mundo gótico al universo renacentista (cat.exposición), Museo de Bellas Artes de Valencia, Generalitat Valenciana, 2001.
- VV.AA.: Canals, la Torre del Borja: excavacions arqueológiques i procés de restauració, Ayuntamiento de Canals, 1995.

== See also ==
- Route of the Borgias
- Tower and walls of the Borgias
