= La Font de la Figuera =

- Municipality
- Fuente la Higuera
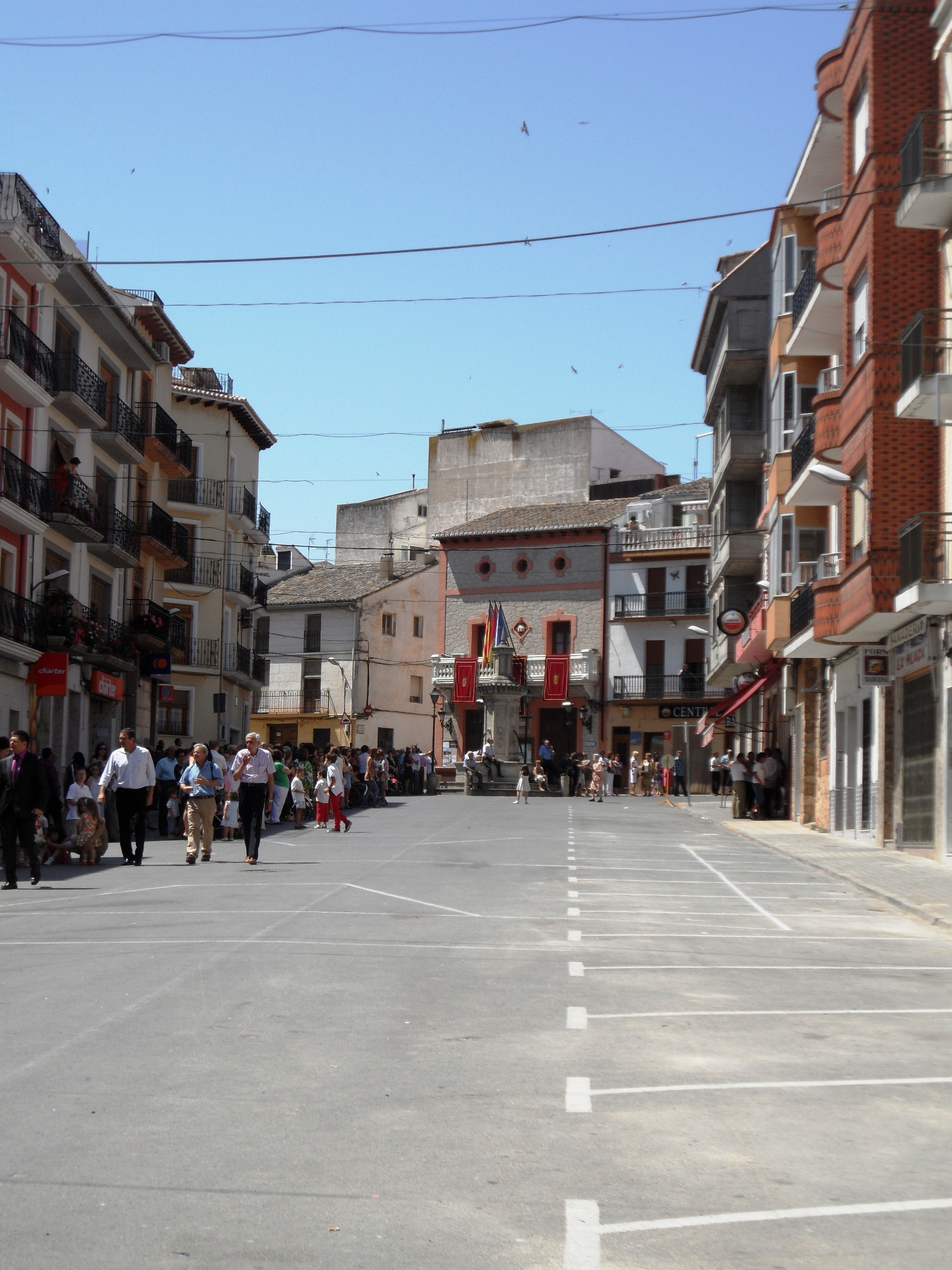

- Coat of arms

- Location in the Province of Valencia Location in the Valencian Community Location in Spain
- Coordinates: 38°48′20″N 0°52′46″W
- Country: Spain
- Autonomous community: Valencian Community
- Province: Valencia
- Comarca: Costera
- Judicial district: Xàtiva

Government
  - Alcalde: Vicent Muñoz i Jordà (2015) (Compromís)

Area
  - Total: 84.34 km^{2} (32.56 sq mi)
- Elevation: 553 m (1,814 ft)

Population (2025-01-01)
  - Total: 2,022
  - Density: 23.97/km^{2} (62.09/sq mi)
- Demonym(s): Fuentehiguerense, fontí/-ina
- Time zone: UTC+1 (CET)
  - Summer (DST): UTC+2 (CEST)
- Postal code: 46630
- Official language(s): Valencian
- Website: lafontdelafiguera.net

La Font de la Figuera (Valencian pronunciation: [la ˈfɔnd de la fiˈɣeɾa]; Spanish: Fuente la Higuera [ˈfwente lajˈɣeɾa]) is a municipality in the comarca of Costera in the Province of Valencia in the Valencian Community, Spain.

The town is famous for its Christmas tradition in which people run through the streets in red underwear. "6 Christmas traditions so strange they're borderline scarring". CNN. December 21, 2016.

== See also ==
- List of municipalities in Valencia
