= Tower and walls of the Borgias =

Coordinates: 38°57′22.47″N 0°35′22.03″W

- Torre y muralla de los Borja (Spanish)
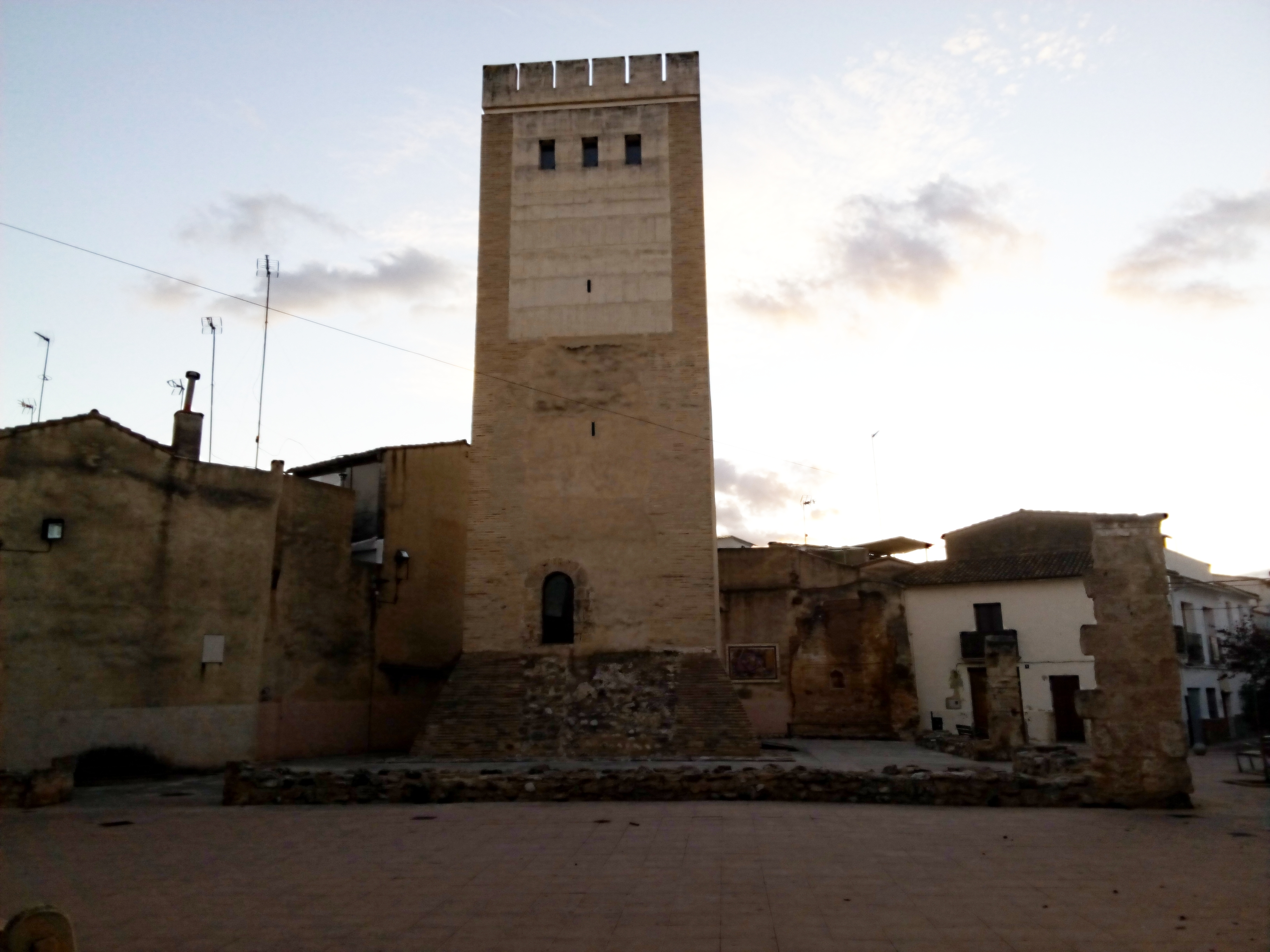
- Tower of the Borgias, Canals
- Interactive map of Tower and walls of the Borgias
- Location: Canals (Valencia)

History
- Built: 13th century- 14th century

Site notes
- Architectural style: Valencian Gothic

Spanish Cultural Heritage
- Official name: Torre y muralla de los Borja
- Type: Non-movable
- Criteria: Monument

The Tower and walls of the Borgias of the Valencian municipality of Canals (Spain), is a Bien de Interés Cultural with the code 46.23.081-003 and Ministerial annotation R-I-51-0010524 with date April 3, 2000. Is also known in valencian as Torreta de Canals.

== History ==
It was constructed in the 13th century during the Muslim era. In the 14th century was constructed a Valencian Gothic style palace using the Muslim tower and part of the walls. This palace belonged to the Borgia family and was the power base of the cadet Borja family from Xativa which held title over the Señorío de Torre de Canals. Pope Callixtus III was one of the members of this family born in this building.

The town hall of Canals acquired the tower and restored in 1995.

== See also ==
- Route of the Borgias
- Oratory of the Borgias
