= Vallés, Valencia =

Vallés
- Municipality
- Flag Coat of arms

- Location in Spain
- Coordinates: 38°59′8″N 0°33′23″W
- Country: Spain
- Autonomous community: Valencian Community
- Province: Valencia
- Comarca: Costera
- Judicial district: Xàtiva

Government
  - Alcalde: José Luis Herrero Postigo

Area
  - Total: 1.2 km^{2} (0.46 sq mi)
- Elevation: 98 m (322 ft)

Population (2025-01-01)
  - Total: 161
  - Density: 130/km^{2} (350/sq mi)
- Demonym: Vallesino/a
- Time zone: UTC+1 (CET)
  - Summer (DST): UTC+2 (CEST)
- Postal code: 46818
- Official language(s): Valencian
- Website: Official website
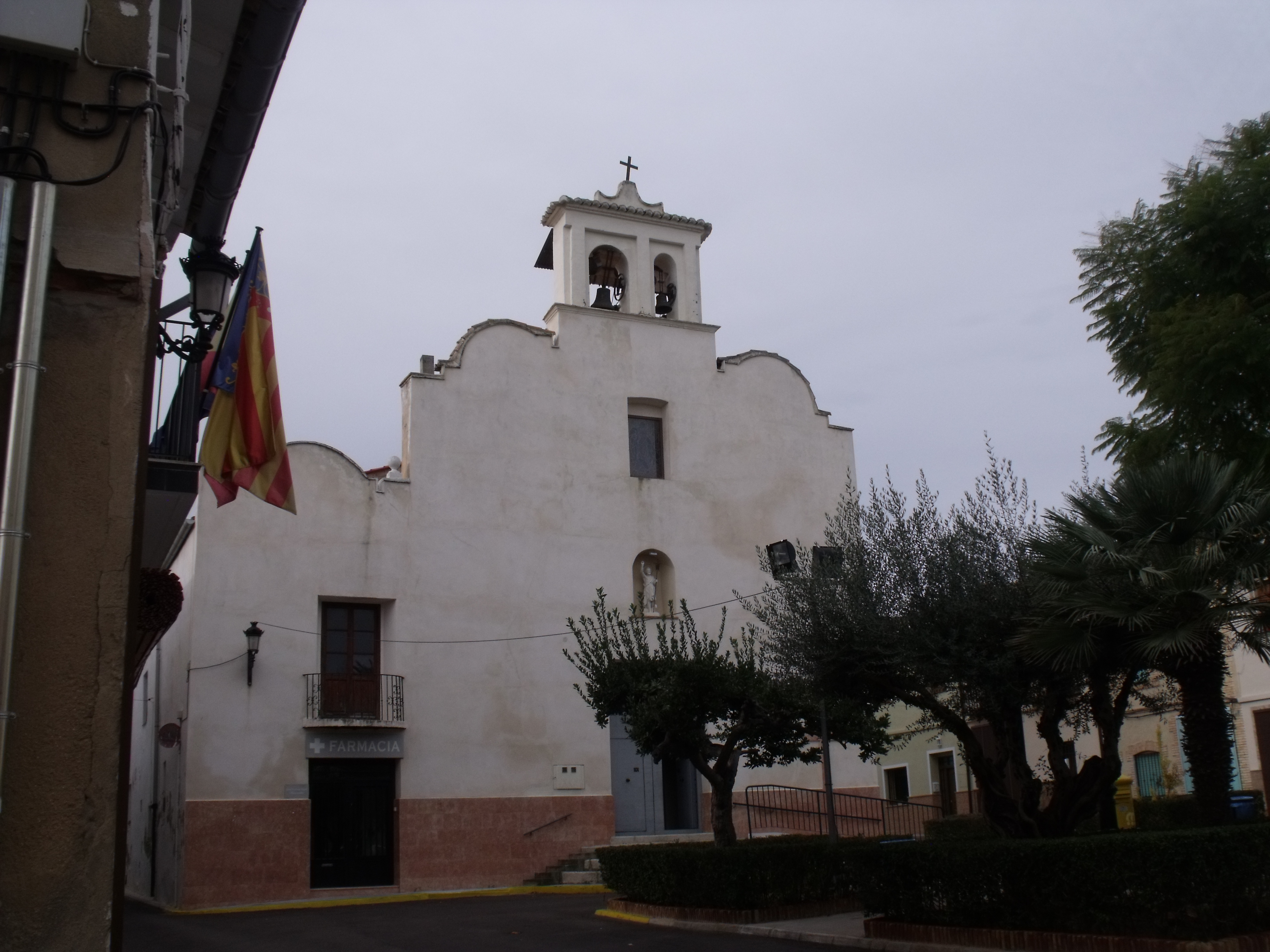
- Exterior of the Church of San Juan Bautista in Vallés

Vallés is a municipality in the comarca of Costera in the Valencian Community, Spain.

== See also ==
- List of municipalities in Valencia
