= Estubeny =

- Municipality
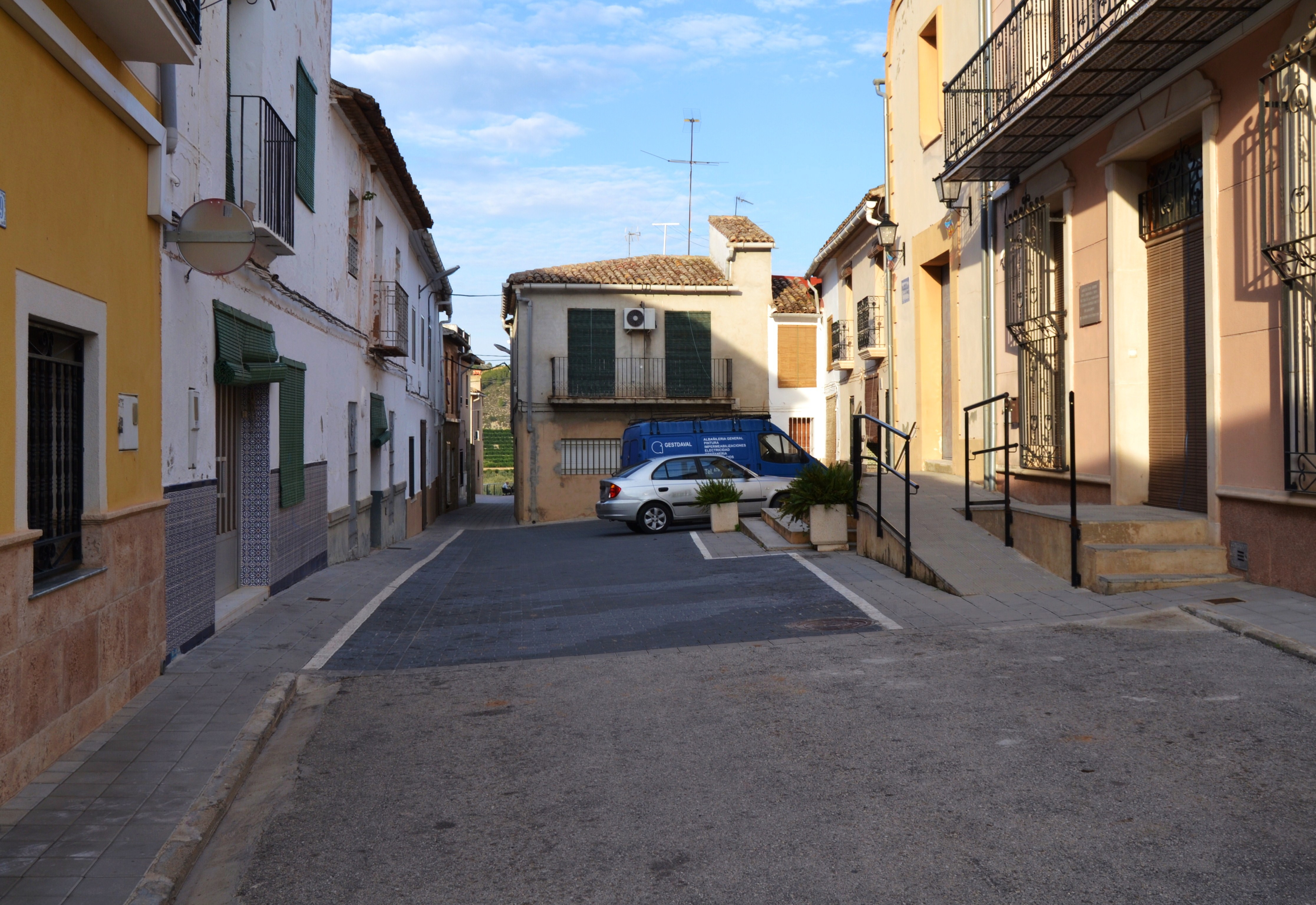

- Coat of arms

- Location in Spain
- Coordinates: 39°1′3″N 0°37′25″W
- Country: Spain
- Autonomous community: Valencian Community
- Province: Valencia
- Comarca: Costera
- Judicial district: Xàtiva

Government

Area
  - Total: 6.4 km^{2} (2.5 sq mi)
- Elevation: 185 m (607 ft)

Population (2025-01-01)
  - Total: 110
  - Density: 17/km^{2} (45/sq mi)
- Demonym(s): Estubenyer, estubenyera
- Time zone: UTC+1 (CET)
  - Summer (DST): UTC+2 (CEST)
- Postal code: 46817
- Official language(s): Valencian
- Website: Official website

Estubeny is a municipality in the comarca of Costera in the Valencian Community, Spain.

== See also ==
- List of municipalities in Valencia
