= Mogente / Moixent =

- Municipality
- Moixent / Mogente
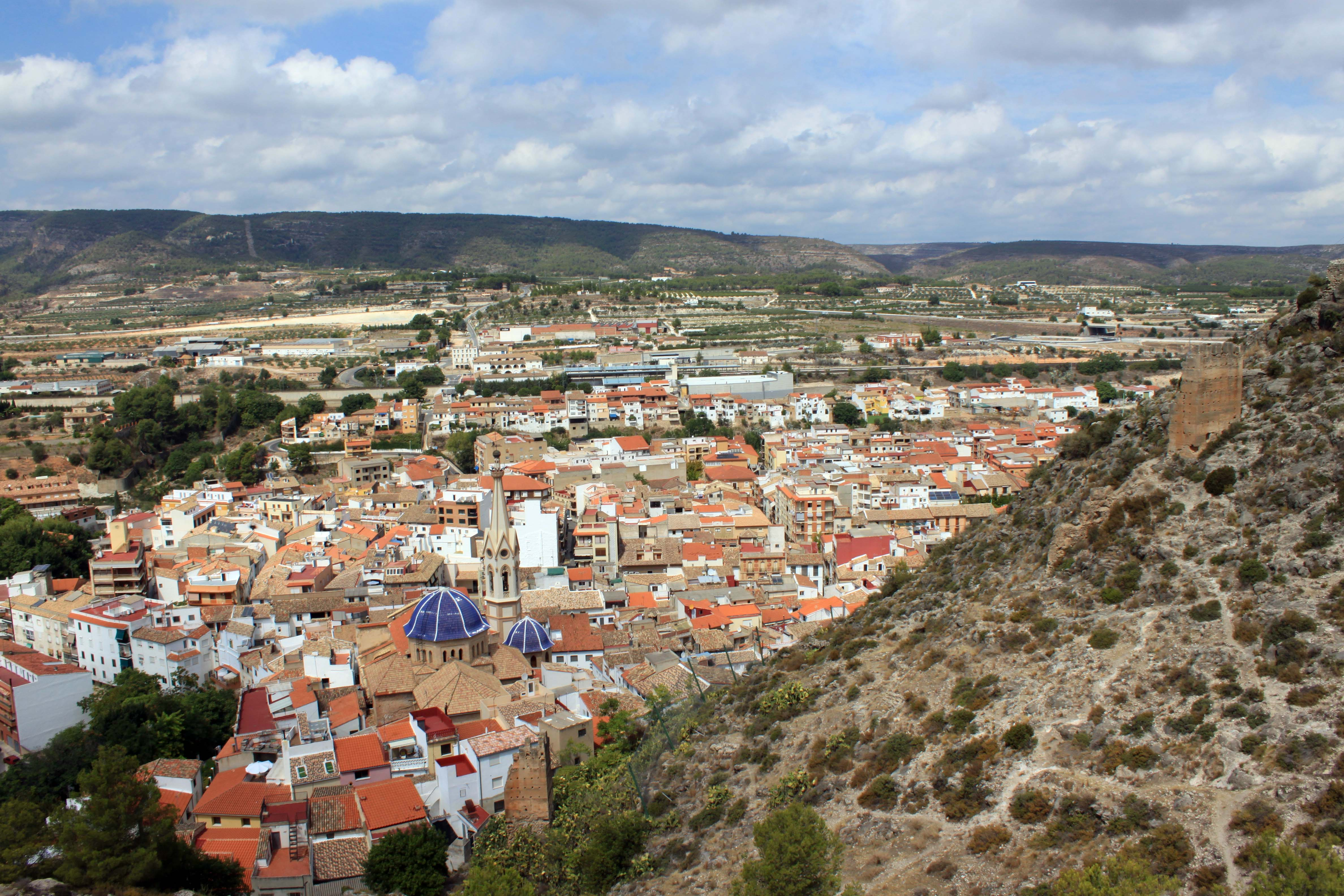

- Flag Coat of arms

- Location in Spain Mogente / Moixent (Valencian Community) Mogente / Moixent (Spain)
- Coordinates: 38°52′32″N 0°45′11″W
- Country: Spain
- Autonomous community: Valencian Community
- Province: Valencia
- Comarca: Costera
- Judicial district: Xàtiva

Government
  - Alcalde: Teófilo Fito (2015) (C's)

Area
  - Total: 150.23 km^{2} (58.00 sq mi)
- Elevation: 284 m (932 ft)

Population (2008)
  - Total: 4,724
  - Density: 31.45/km^{2} (81.44/sq mi)
- Demonym(s): mogentino/a moixentí/ína
- Time zone: UTC+1 (CET)
  - Summer (DST): UTC+2 (CEST)
- Postal code: 46640
- Official language(s): Spanish and Valencian
- Website: Official website

Mogente (Spanish: [moˈxente]) is a municipality or Moixent (Valencian: [mojˈʃent]) in the comarca of Costera in the Valencian Community, Spain.

The municipal area contains the ruins of la Bastida de les Alcusses, one of the most important Iberian archaeological sites in the Valencian Community.

== See also ==
- List of municipalities in Valencia
