= L'Olleria =

- Municipality
- Coat of arms

- Location in Spain
- Coordinates: 38°54′51″N 0°32′58″W
- Country: Spain
- Autonomous community: Valencian Community
- Province: Valencia
- Comarca: Vall d'Albaida
- Judicial district: Ontinyent

Government
  - Alcalde: Julià Engo i Fresneda (2007) (BNV)

Area
  - Total: 32.2 km^{2} (12.4 sq mi)
- Elevation: 425 m (1,394 ft)

Population (2025-01-01)
  - Total: 8,818
  - Density: 274/km^{2} (709/sq mi)
- Demonym(s): Ollerià, olleriana
- Time zone: UTC+1 (CET)
  - Summer (DST): UTC+2 (CEST)
- Postal code: 46850
- Official language(s): Valencian
- Website: Official website

L'Olleria is a municipality in the comarca of Vall d'Albaida in the Valencian Community, Spain. It is famous by its glass manufacturing activity, especially blown glass. L'Olleria is an important industrial site in the Vall d'Albaida area.

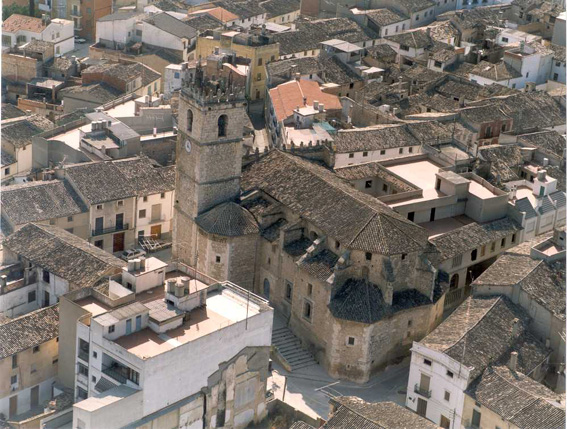
The church of St Mary Magdalen

== See also ==
- List of municipalities in Valencia
