= La Granja de la Costera =

- Municipality
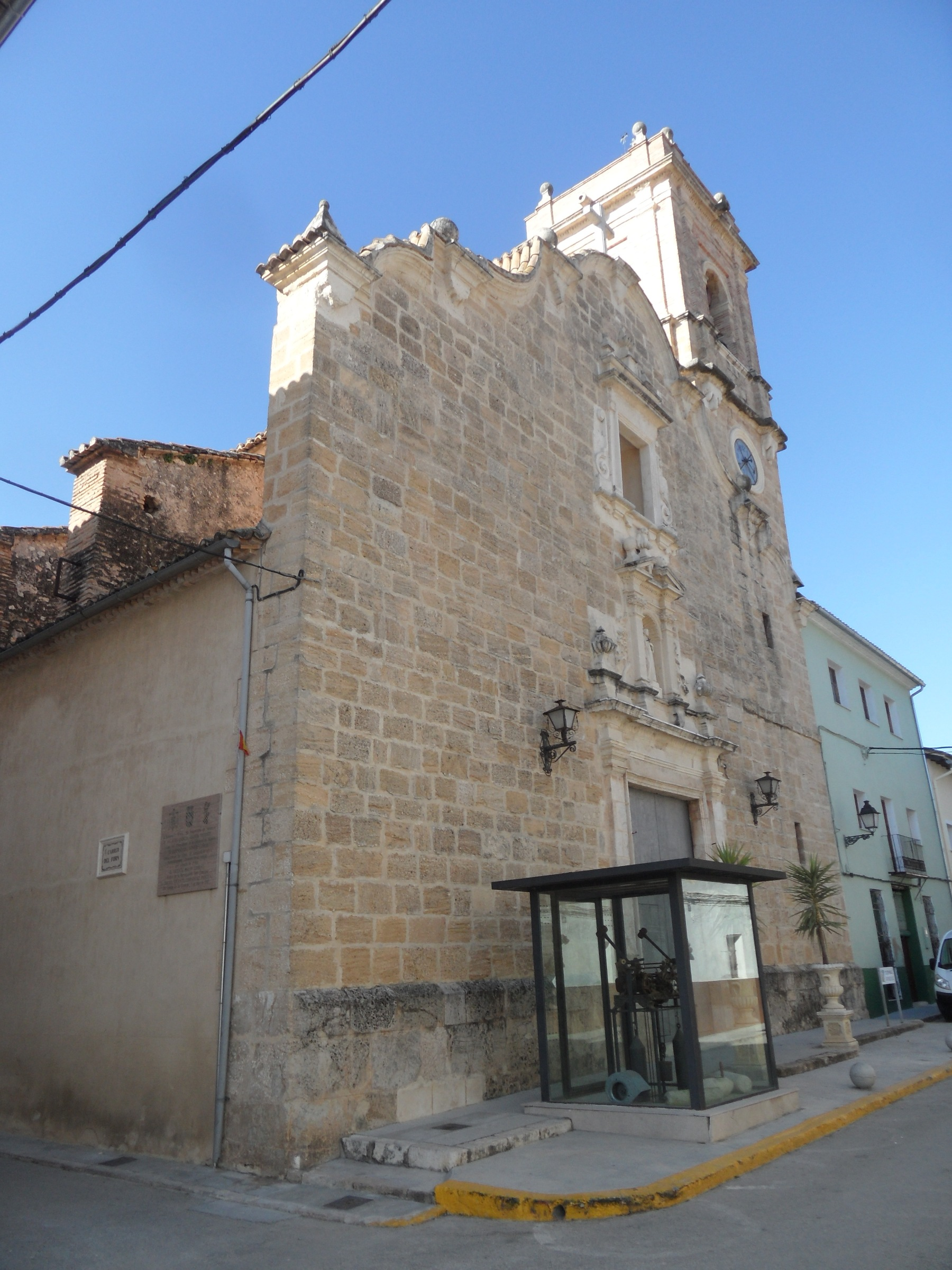

- Flag Coat of arms

- Location in Spain
- Coordinates: 38°59′45″N 0°33′26″W
- Country: Spain
- Autonomous community: Valencian Community
- Province: Valencia
- Comarca: Costera
- Judicial district: Xàtiva

Government
  - Alcalde: Carlos Garrido Calabuig

Area
  - Total: 0.83 km^{2} (0.32 sq mi)
- Elevation: 98 m (322 ft)

Population (2025-01-01)
  - Total: 306
  - Density: 370/km^{2} (950/sq mi)
- Demonym: Granjero/a
- Time zone: UTC+1 (CET)
  - Summer (DST): UTC+2 (CEST)
- Postal code: 46814
- Official language(s): Valencian
- Website: Official website

La Granja de la Costera is a municipality in the comarca of Costera in the Valencian Community, Spain.

== See also ==
- List of municipalities in Valencia
