= Llanera de Ranes =

- Municipality
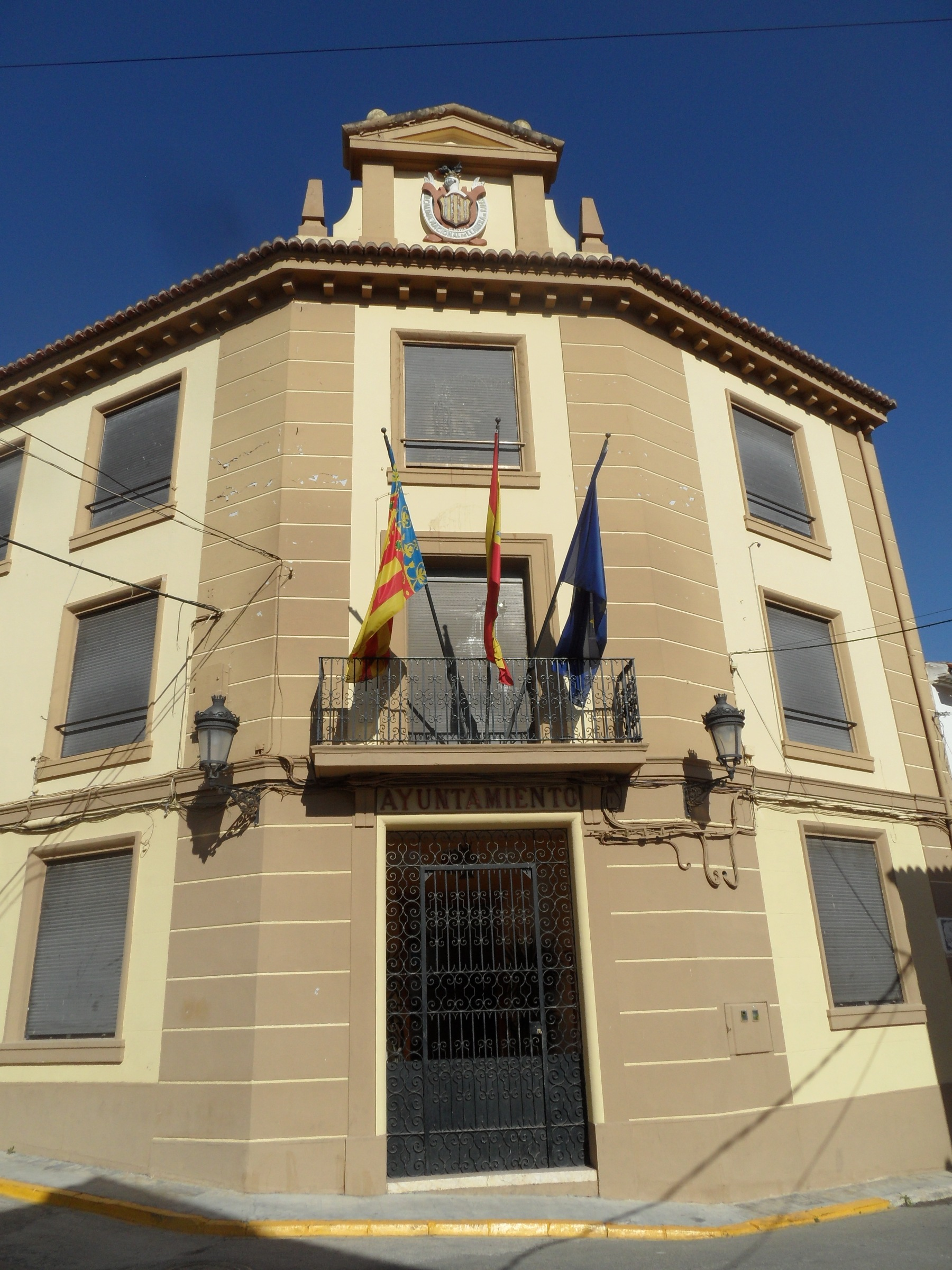
- Town hall

- Coat of arms

- Location in Spain
- Coordinates: 38°59′40″N 0°34′31″W
- Country: Spain
- Autonomous community: Valencian Community
- Province: Valencia
- Comarca: Costera
- Judicial district: Xàtiva

Government
  - Alcalde: Vicente Sanchis Bonete

Area
  - Total: 9.3 km^{2} (3.6 sq mi)
- Elevation: 140 m (460 ft)

Population (2025-01-01)
  - Total: 1,062
  - Density: 110/km^{2} (300/sq mi)
- Demonym: Llanerano/a
- Time zone: UTC+1 (CET)
  - Summer (DST): UTC+2 (CEST)
- Postal code: 46814
- Official language(s): Valencian
- Website: Official website

Llanera de Ranes is a municipality in the comarca of Costera in the Valencian Community, Spain.

The town is located on some flat terrain of the left bank of the Canyoles river. Now a community of 1,000 people, the municipality is quite old. The town had 44 houses in 1646. When the Moors were driven out of Spain around 1700, the village became almost a ghost town. In 1743 there was a serious earthquake that killed many people in the village. As a result of the disaster, the town of Torrent de Fenollet was annexed, which had been practically emptied by the earthquake. In 1794, the population of Llanera de Ranes had climbed to 500, and 1897 that had risen to 840.

Major crops grown are citrus (150 Ha), various vegetables, corn and tubers in irrigated lands; olives (150 Ha), carob, grapes, and cereals are grown in the unirrigated areas.

Modern population
1990	1992	1994	1996	1998	2000	2002	2004	2005	2007
970	963	1,002	1,056	1,013	992	1,136	1,059	1,056	1,077

== See also ==
- List of municipalities in Valencia
