= Vallada =

- Municipality
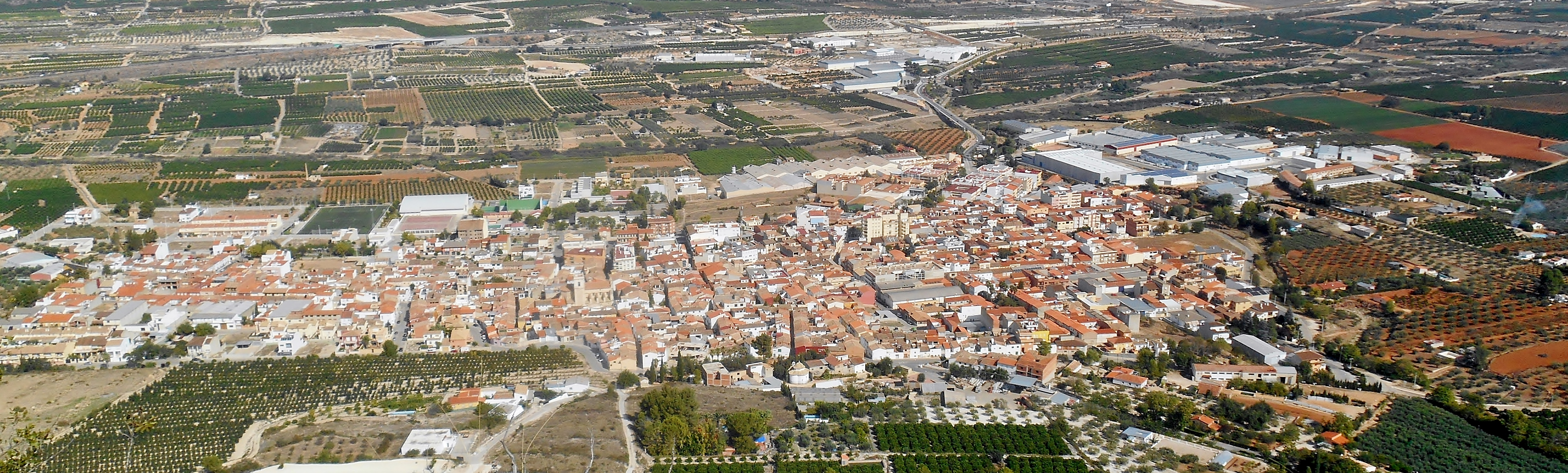

- Flag Coat of arms

- Location in Spain
- Coordinates: 38°53′45″N 0°41′31″W
- Country: Spain
- Autonomous community: Valencian Community
- Province: Valencia
- Comarca: Costera
- Judicial district: Xàtiva

Government
  - Alcalde: Fernando María Giner Giner

Area
  - Total: 61.50 km^{2} (23.75 sq mi)
- Elevation: 300 m (980 ft)

Population (2025-01-01)
  - Total: 3,091
  - Density: 50.26/km^{2} (130.2/sq mi)
- Demonym: Valladino/a
- Time zone: UTC+1 (CET)
  - Summer (DST): UTC+2 (CEST)
- Postal code: 46691
- Official language(s): Valencian
- Website: Official website

Vallada is a municipality in the comarca of Costera in the Valencian Community, Spain.

== See also ==
- List of municipalities in Valencia
