= Cerdà =

- Municipality
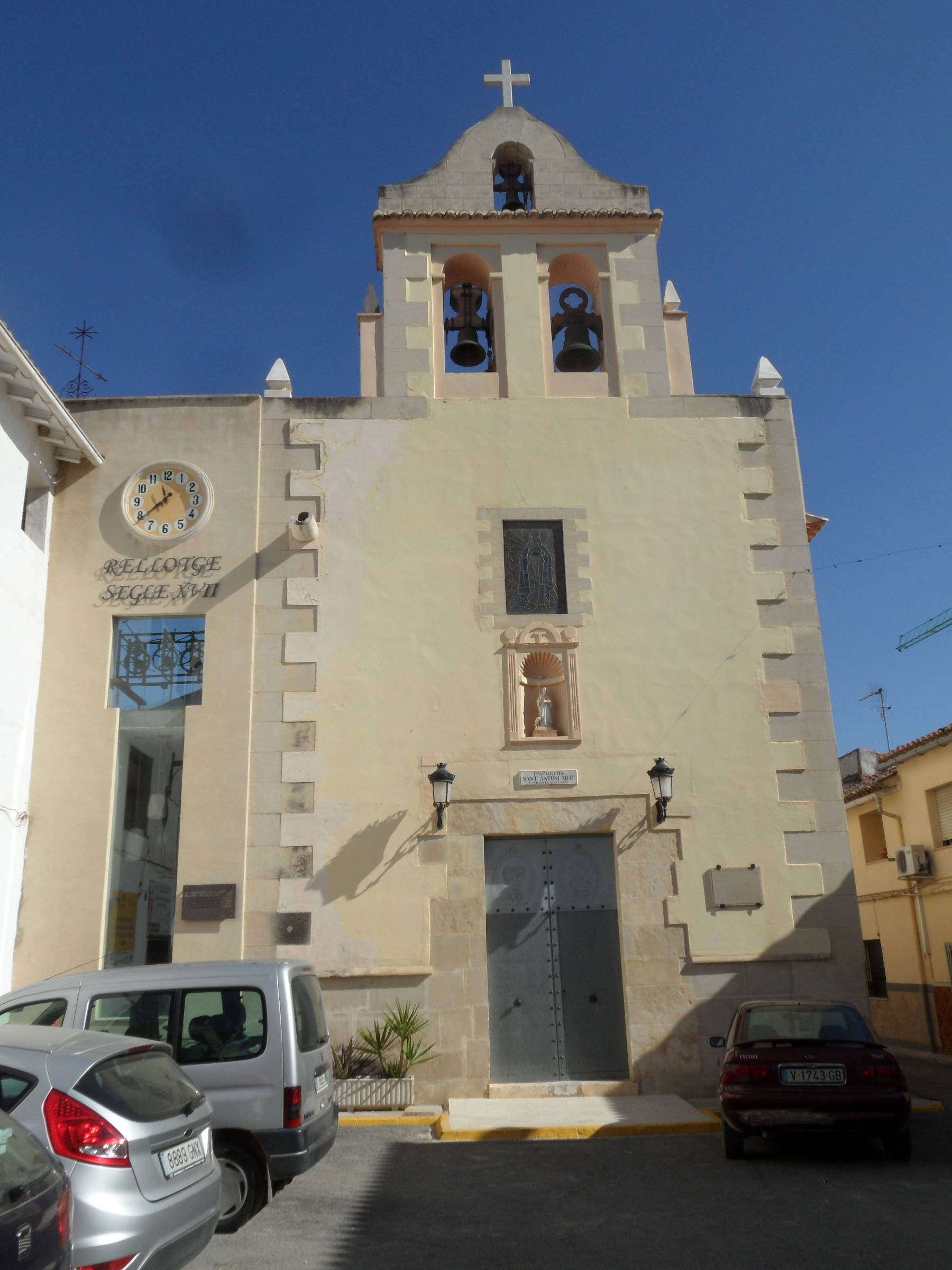

- Flag Coat of arms

- Location in Spain
- Coordinates: 38°59′8″N 0°34′26″W
- Country: Spain
- Autonomous community: Valencian Community
- Province: Valencia
- Comarca: Costera
- Judicial district: Xàtiva

Government
  - Alcalde: José Luís Gijón Segrelles (Democrates Valencians)

Area
  - Total: 1.52 km^{2} (0.59 sq mi)
- Elevation: 136 m (446 ft)

Population (2025-01-01)
  - Total: 370
  - Density: 240/km^{2} (630/sq mi)
- Demonym(s): Cerdaí, cerdaïna
- Time zone: UTC+1 (CET)
  - Summer (DST): UTC+2 (CEST)
- Postal code: 46813
- Official language(s): Valencian
- Website: Official website

Cerdà (Spanish: Cerdá) is a municipality in the comarca of Costera in the Valencian Community, Spain.

== See also ==
- List of municipalities in Valencia
