= Costera (comarca) =

Coordinates: 38°55′30″N 0°40′19″W

- Comarca
- Country: Spain
- Autonomous community: Valencian Community
- Province: València / Valencia
- Capital and largest city: Xàtiva
- Municipalities: 19 municipalities: L'Alcúdia de Crespins, Barxeta, Canals, Cerdà, Estubeny, La Font de la Figuera, Genovés, La Granja de la Costera, Llanera de Ranes, Llocnou d'En Fenollet, La Llosa de Ranes, Moixent/Mogente, Montesa, Novetlè/Novelé, Rotglà i Corberà, Torrella, Vallada, Vallès, Xàtiva

Area
  - Total: 546.74 km^{2} (211.10 sq mi)

Population (2006)
  - Total: 70,692
  - Density: 129.30/km^{2} (334.88/sq mi)
- Time zone: UTC+1 (CET)
  - Summer (DST): UTC+2 (CEST)

Costera (Valencian: [kosˈteɾa]; Spanish: [kosˈteɾa]) is a comarca in the province of Valencia, Valencian Community, Spain.

== Municipalities ==
Municipalities of Costera

- L'Alcúdia de Crespins
- Barxeta
- Canals
- Cerdà
- Estubeny
- La Font de la Figuera
- Genovés
- La Granja de la Costera
- Llanera de Ranes
- Llocnou d'En Fenollet
- La Llosa de Ranes
- Moixent/Mogente
- Montesa
- Novetlè/Novelé
- Rotglà i Corberà
- Torrella
- Vallada
- Vallès
- Xàtiva
