= Torrella =

- Municipality
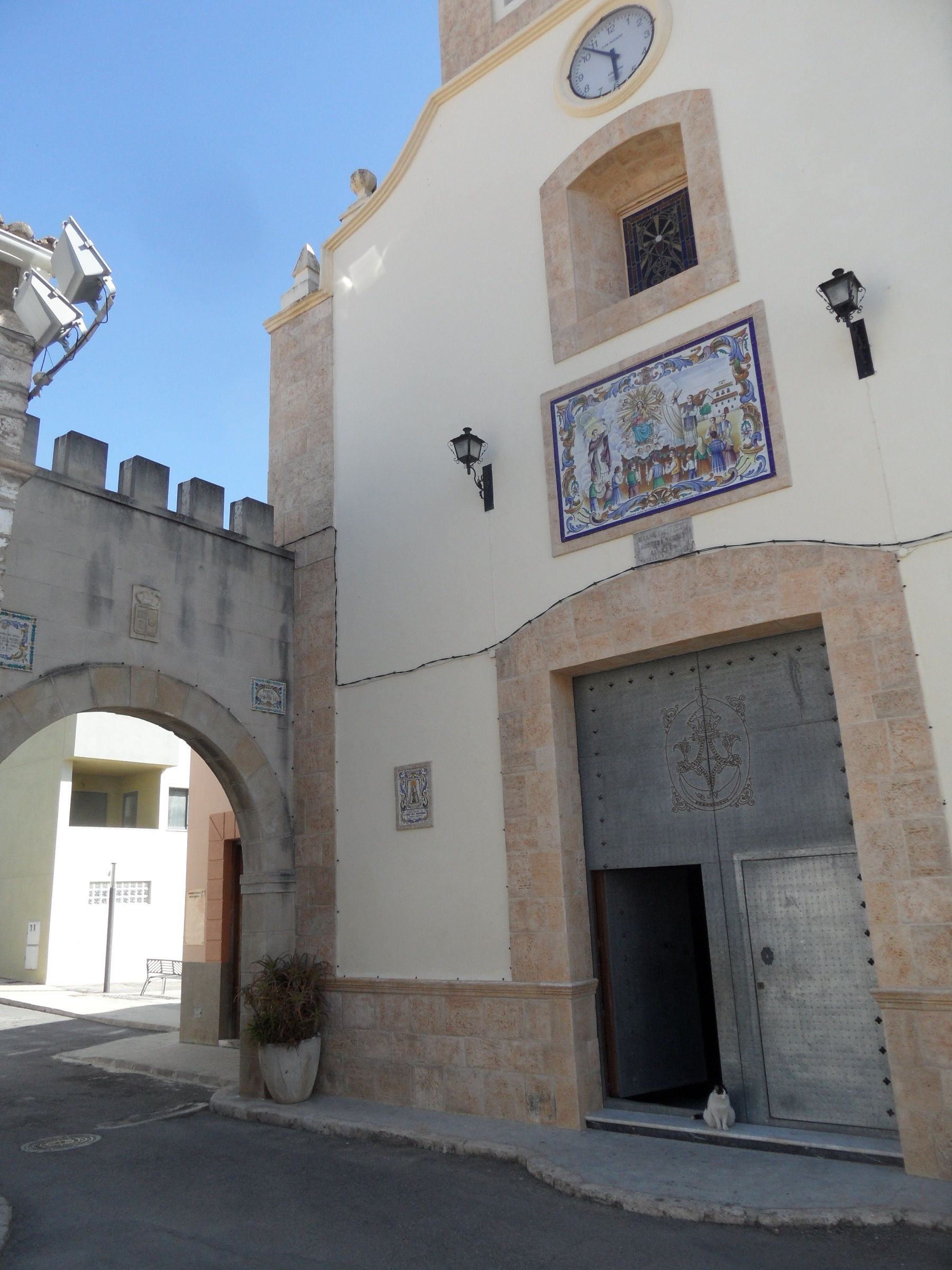

- Coat of arms

- Location in Spain
- Coordinates: 38°59′20″N 0°34′18″W
- Country: Spain
- Autonomous community: Valencian Community
- Province: Valencia
- Comarca: Costera
- Judicial district: Xàtiva

Government
  - Alcalde: Francisco Moreno Gayá

Area
  - Total: 1.1 km^{2} (0.42 sq mi)
- Elevation: 135 m (443 ft)

Population (2025-01-01)
  - Total: 151
  - Density: 140/km^{2} (360/sq mi)
- Demonym: Torrellano/a
- Time zone: UTC+1 (CET)
  - Summer (DST): UTC+2 (CEST)
- Postal code: 46814
- Official language(s): Valenciano
- Website: Official website

Torrella is a municipality in the comarca of Costera in the Valencian Community, Spain.

== See also ==
- List of municipalities in Valencia
