= Novetlè =

- Municipality
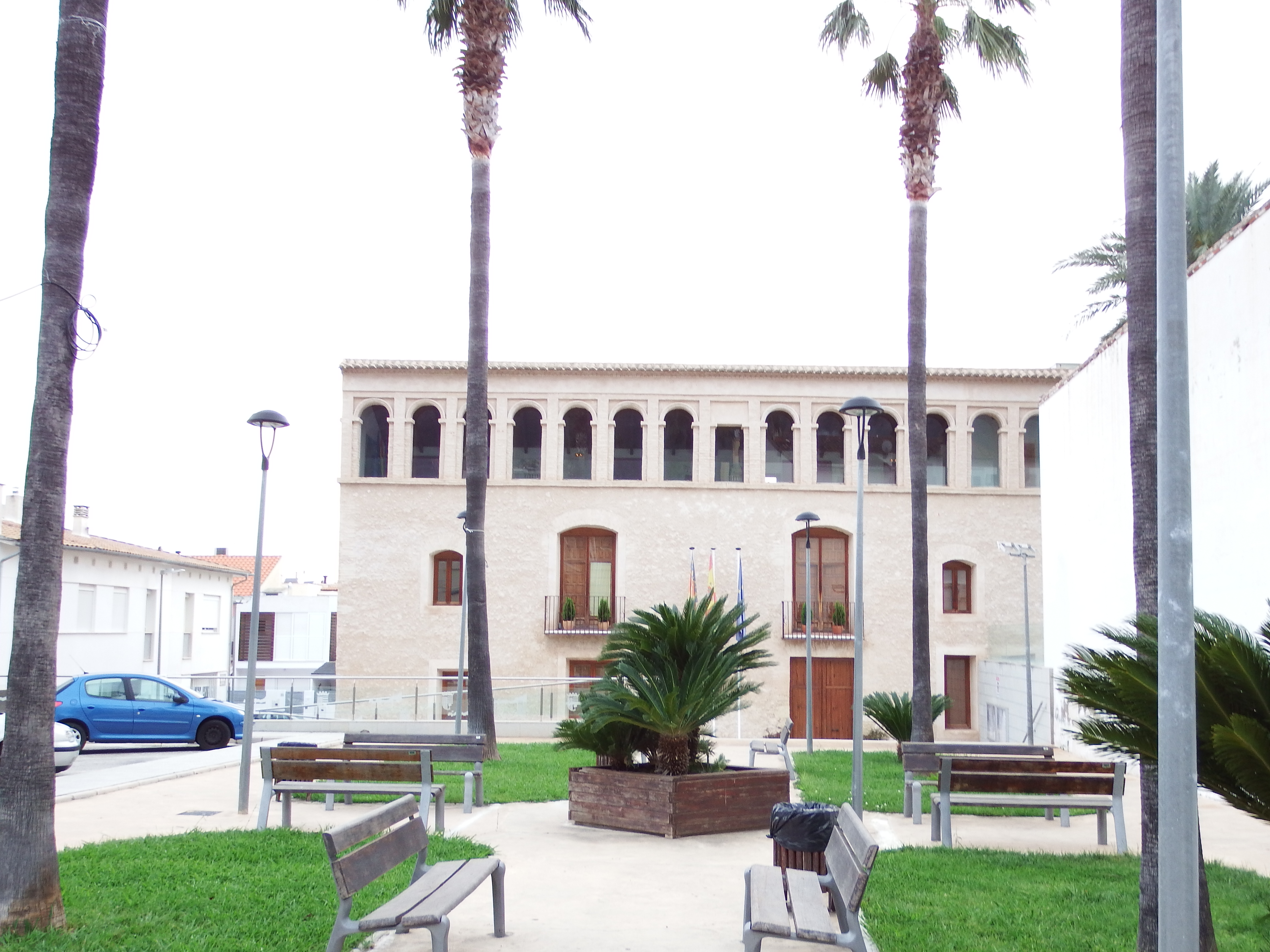
- Town hall

- Coat of arms

- Location in Spain
- Coordinates: 38°58′50″N 0°32′51″W
- Country: Spain
- Autonomous community: Valencian Community
- Province: Valencia
- Comarca: Costera
- Judicial district: Xàtiva

Government
  - Alcalde: Rafael Vila Noguera (PSPV-PSOE)

Area
  - Total: 1.47 km^{2} (0.57 sq mi)
- Elevation: 84 m (276 ft)

Population (2023)
  - Total: 856
  - Density: 582/km^{2} (1,510/sq mi)
- Demonym: Novetlerí/-ina
- Time zone: UTC+1 (CET)
  - Summer (DST): UTC+2 (CEST)
- Postal code: 46819
- Official language(s): Valencian
- Website: Official website

Novetlè (Valencian: [noveˈlːɛ]) is a municipality in the comarca of Costera in the Valencian Community, Spain.

== See also ==
- List of municipalities in Valencia
