= L'Alcúdia de Crespins =

L'Alcúdia de Crespins Alcudia de Crespins
- Municipality
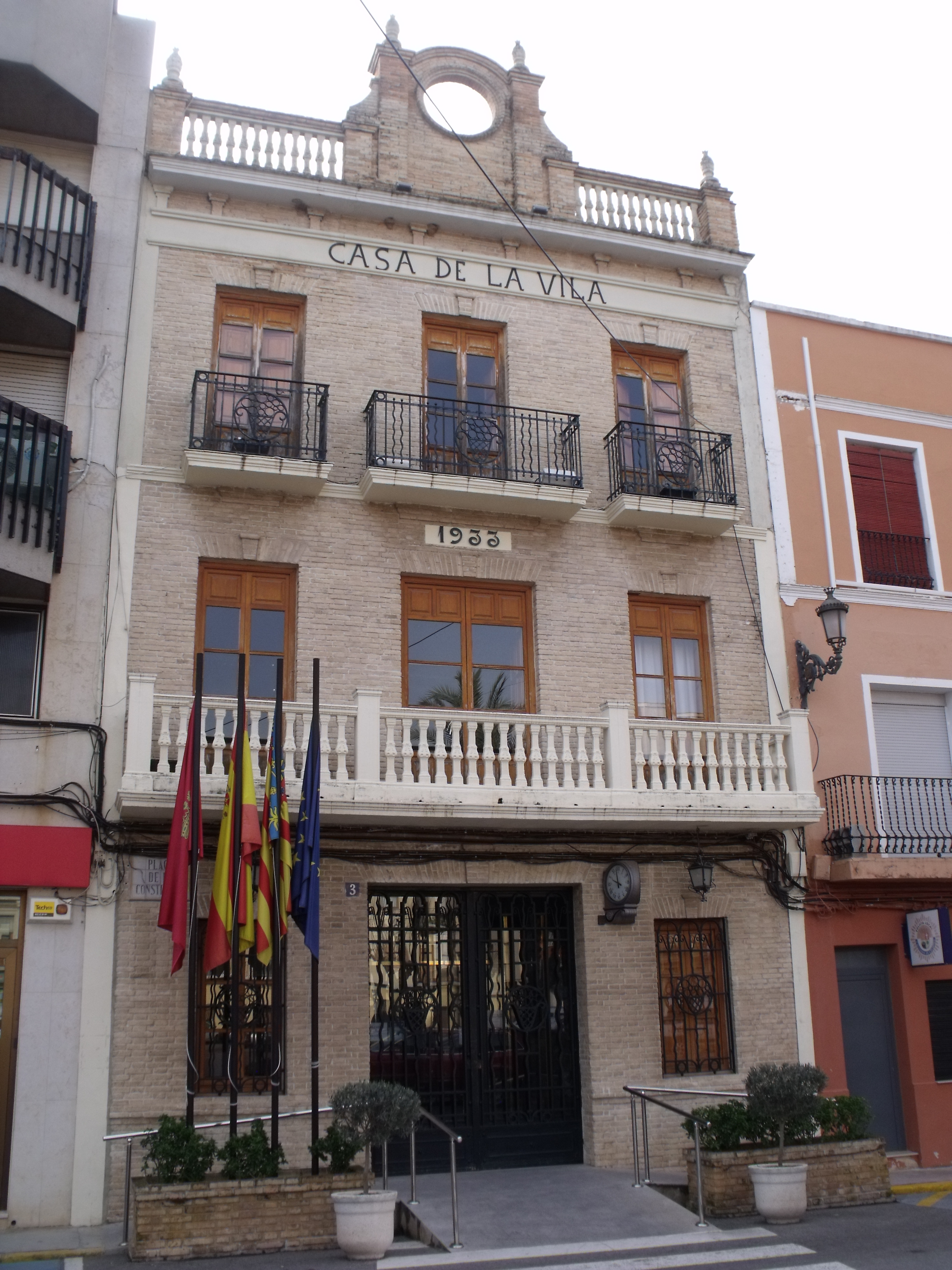
- Town hall

- Flag Coat of arms

- Location in Spain
- Coordinates: 38°58′15″N 0°35′27″W
- Country: Spain
- Autonomous community: Valencian Community
- Province: Valencia
- Comarca: Costera
- Judicial district: Xàtiva

Government
  - Alcalde: Javier Sicluna i Lletget

Area
  - Total: 5.20 km^{2} (2.01 sq mi)
- Elevation: 160 m (520 ft)

Population (2025-01-01)
  - Total: 5,548
  - Density: 1,070/km^{2} (2,760/sq mi)
- Demonym: Alcudiano/a
- Time zone: UTC+1 (CET)
  - Summer (DST): UTC+2 (CEST)
- Postal code: 46690
- Official language(s): Valencian
- Website: Official website

L'Alcúdia de Crespins is a municipality in the comarca of Costera in the Valencian Community, Spain.

== History ==
L'Alcúdia de Crespins dates back to the Roman era. Evidence of this can be seen in the archaeological sites and artifacts discovered in the town and its surroundings. One notable site is the Roman villa of Els Munts, where ancient mosaics and ruins have been preserved. This historical heritage provides insights into the town's past and offers visitors an opportunity to connect with the lives of those who came before.

In 2004 a Mithraeum was discovered in the ruins of Els Munts

== See also ==
- List of municipalities in Valencia
