= Montesa, Spain =

Montesa
- Municipality
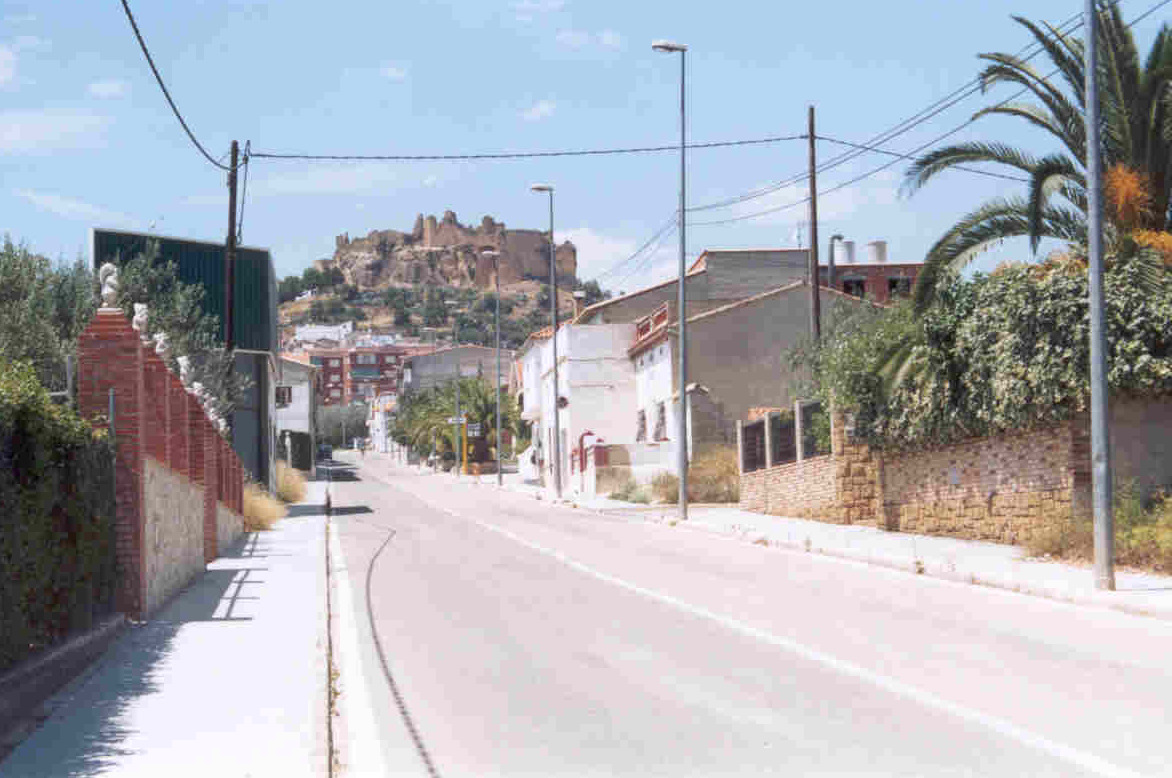

- Coat of arms

- Location in Spain
- Coordinates: 38°57′0″N 0°39′11″W
- Country: Spain
- Autonomous community: Valencian Community
- Province: Valencia
- Comarca: Costera
- Judicial district: Xàtiva

Government
  - Alcalde: José Albalat Grimaltos

Area
  - Total: 48.1 km^{2} (18.6 sq mi)
- Elevation: 340 m (1,120 ft)

Population (2025-01-01)
  - Total: 1,128
  - Density: 23.5/km^{2} (60.7/sq mi)
- Demonym: Montesino/a
- Time zone: UTC+1 (CET)
  - Summer (DST): UTC+2 (CEST)
- Postal code: 46692
- Official language(s): Valencian
- Website: Official website

Montesa is a municipality in the comarca of Costera in the Valencian Community, Spain.

== See also ==
- List of municipalities in Valencia
