= Valencian Canton =

Valencian Canton Cantón Valenciano (Spanish)
- Capital: Valencia
  - Type: Revolutionary junta
- Historical era: Cantonal rebellion
  - Established: 18 July 1873
  - Disestablished: 8 August 1873
Preceded by	Succeeded by
First Spanish Republic	First Spanish Republic
- Today part of: Spain

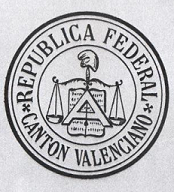
Seal of the Valencian Canton

The Valencian Canton, also known as the Canton of Valencia, was one of the first independent cantons proclaimed during the Cantonal rebellion that took place during the First Spanish Republic (1873–1874). It was officially proclaimed on 18 July 1873, and 178 municipalities of the Valencia province adhered to it. It fell on 8 August, when the troops of Martínez Campos, sent by the federal republican government of Nicolás Salmerón, entered the city of Valencia, causing the surrender of the Canton.

== History ==
=== Proclamation of the canton ===
On 14 July 1873, two days after the proclamation of the Canton of Cartagena, pasquines with the text "Today the Canton is proclaimed" appeared in Valencia and armed groups toured the city. Then the civil governor Castejón called a meeting of the commanders of the "Volunteers of the Republic" militias together with the mayor and the military commanders, achieving the commitment of the former not to proclaim the Canton of Valencia without the approval of the constituent Cortes. But the tension did not subside, and on 17 July the governor asked the federal republicans of Valencia to send a telegraph to members of their party to calm them down. However, that same day, a massive event was held in front of the civil government to pay tribute to the militiamen who had returned by train from fighting the internationalists of the Petroleum Revolution in Alcoy and the crowd gathered there, after a harangue by the Feliu deputy, shouted "Long live the Valencian Canton".

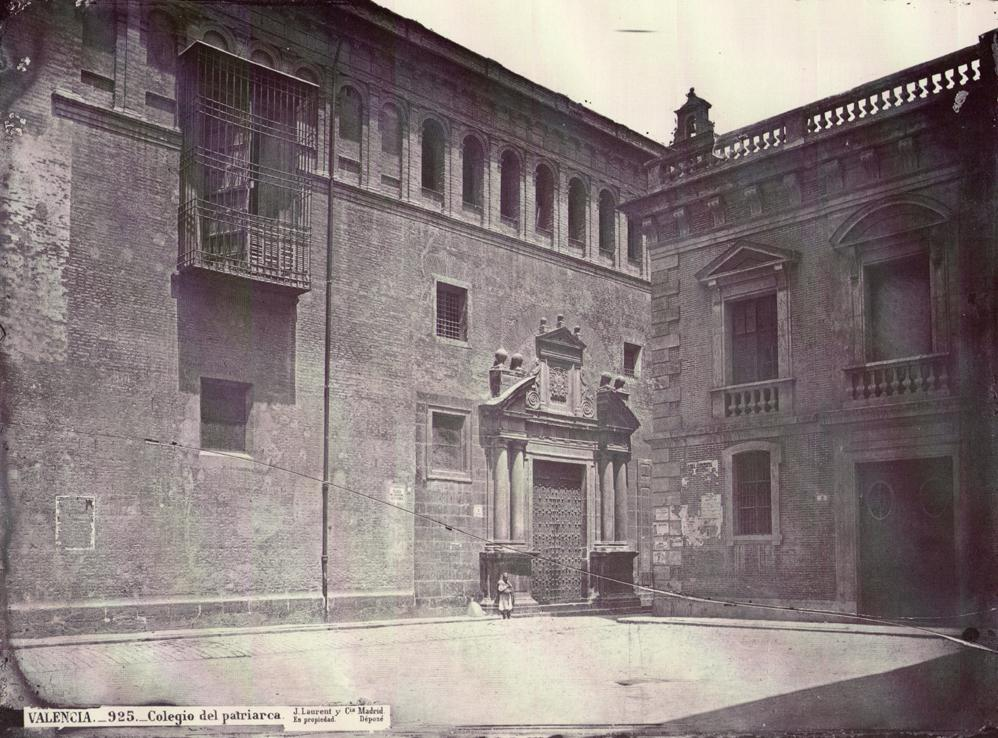
View of the Colegio del Patriarca (left) and the building of University of Valencia (right) in the 1870s. In the ceremonial hall of the university the Valencian Canton was proclaimed on 18 July 1873

At night, some battalions of the militia were deployed at strategic points in the city, and by the night of 18 July the Canton had been proclaimed. That same day, news of the fall of the Government in Madrid of the "centrist" federal republican Francisco Pi y Margall had arrived.

The next day, 19 July, the members of the "Revolutionary Junta" of the Valencian Canton were elected, which was chaired by Pedro Barrientos, professor at the School of Fine Arts. The civil governor Castejón, who had fled to Alcira by train, where declared in a manifesto that he made public on 20 July that "the Valencian Canton has been proclaimed, separating Valencia from the common homeland" in a "flaunt of lack of respect for the law" and that he continued to be the highest authority in the province awaiting orders from the Executive Branch of the Republic. By 22 July, 178 towns had already joined the Valencian Canton, although Castejón managed to get the permanent commission of the provincial deputation to collaborate with the government. That same day, the president of the Junta, Pedro Barrientos, made the official proclamation of the Canton in the square of the Valencia cathedral, which was renamed Plaza de la República Federal. 28 battalions of unarmed militiamen then paraded and the anthem of La Marseillaise was played.

=== Canton of Castelló ===
On 21 July, federal deputy Francisco González Chermá left Valencia, with a force of 100 volunteers, two companies of police and one of infantry to proclaim the Canton of Castelló. When he arrived in the city of Castelló de la Plana, he dissolved the Provincial Council and proclaimed the Canton, but unlike what happened in the province of Valencia, the towns of the province of Castelló opposed cantonalism, since many of them were Carlists, especially those from the Maestrazgo area. This made possible the immediate action of the conservative forces that, on 26 July, entered Castelló and dissolved the "revolutionary Junta" putting an end to the Canton of Castelló.

=== Encirclement and surrender of the canton ===
At the same time that General Manuel Pavía was developing military operations to put an end to the cantonal movement in Andalusia, General Arsenio Martínez Campos was in charge of Valencia and Murcia. On 24 July the troops of Martínez Campos made the first attempt to penetrate Valencia from the nearby town of Catarroja, being repelled near the bullring with three dead and five wounded, while the cantonals had one dead and three injured. Due to the absence of walls (they had been demolished eight years before, except for the old gates of the Torres de Serranos and the Torres de Quart) barricades and defensive structures had to be improvised at all entrances to Valencia. The defense was reinforced with cannons, and the Junta prohibited men of "military age" from leaving Valencia to avoid desertions. On Saturday 2 August, after the failure of several attempts at negotiation, Martínez Campos began the bombardment of the city from Xirivella, about two kilometers west of Valencia, while the cantonalists responded from the cannon they had placed at the Torres de Cuart.

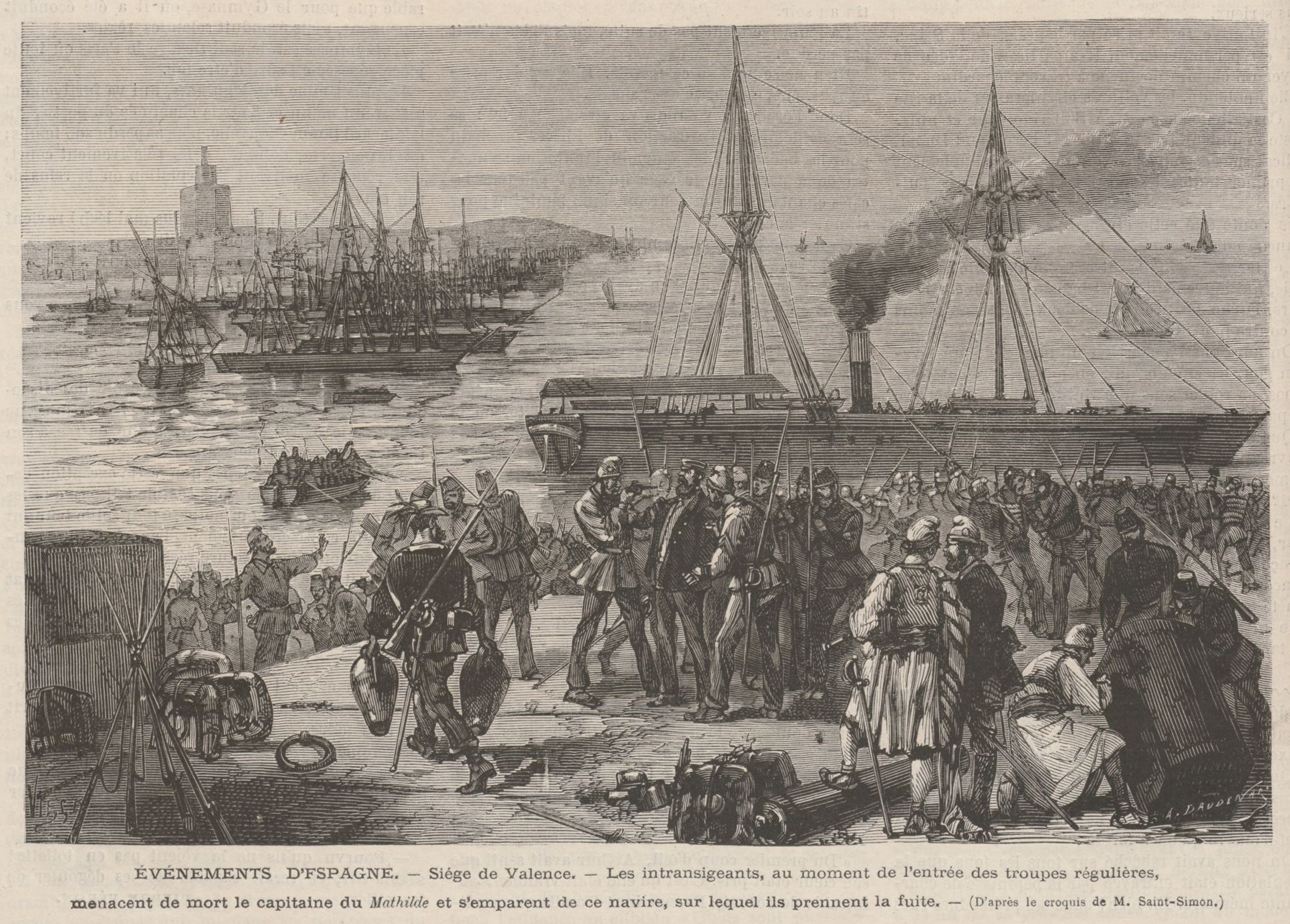
Boarding into the Matilde during the siege of Valencia, drawing of Vierge published in Le Monde Illustré in August 1873

The increasingly precise bombardment of Valencia caused panic among the population and discouragement spread. A commission formed by the consuls of the Kingdom of Italy and the United Kingdom of Great Britain and Ireland and the local conservative politician and writer Teodoro Llorente met on Tuesday 5 August, with General Martínez Campos at his headquarters in Quart de Poblet and negotiated the temporary cease of the bombardment until 12 in the morning of the next day. When the commission returned to Valencia they informed the Junta who quickly drafted a document with proposed conditions of surrender that included amnesty for the insurgents which was taken to Quart de Poblet by three commissioners. Martínez Campos told them that it was not in his power to grant an amnesty. A new commission that met in Alcira with the civil governor Castejón received the answer that only unconditional surrender was possible. The cantonal Junta, together with the leaders of the militia, who had taken refuge in the cathedral, voted in favor of surrender, so the most committed people headed to the port of Valencia accompanied by a crowd to board the steamship Matilde, seized by the Junta a few days before, to head to Cartagena, where they were going to continue the fight. Afterwards, the white flag was raised on the Miguelete, the highest tower in the city, and on the Serranos and Quart Towers.

Martínez Campos entered the city through the Torres de Quart to occupy the General Captaincy building, where he told a commission that met with him to request clemency: "I may be lenient with political crimes, but I will shoot the murderer because, in my ideas, there is no room for the abolition of the death penalty without first abolishing murder". The next day, 9 August, Martínez Campos made public a statement ordering the dissolution of the militias and the surrender of their weapons within two hours, under threat of subjecting those who disobeyed to a court martial. When Castejón returned to occupy his position in the Civil Government that same day, he requested the collaboration of "enlightened and sensible" people and imprisoned the rector Pérez Pujol, although he was released shortly after.

== Extension of the canton ==
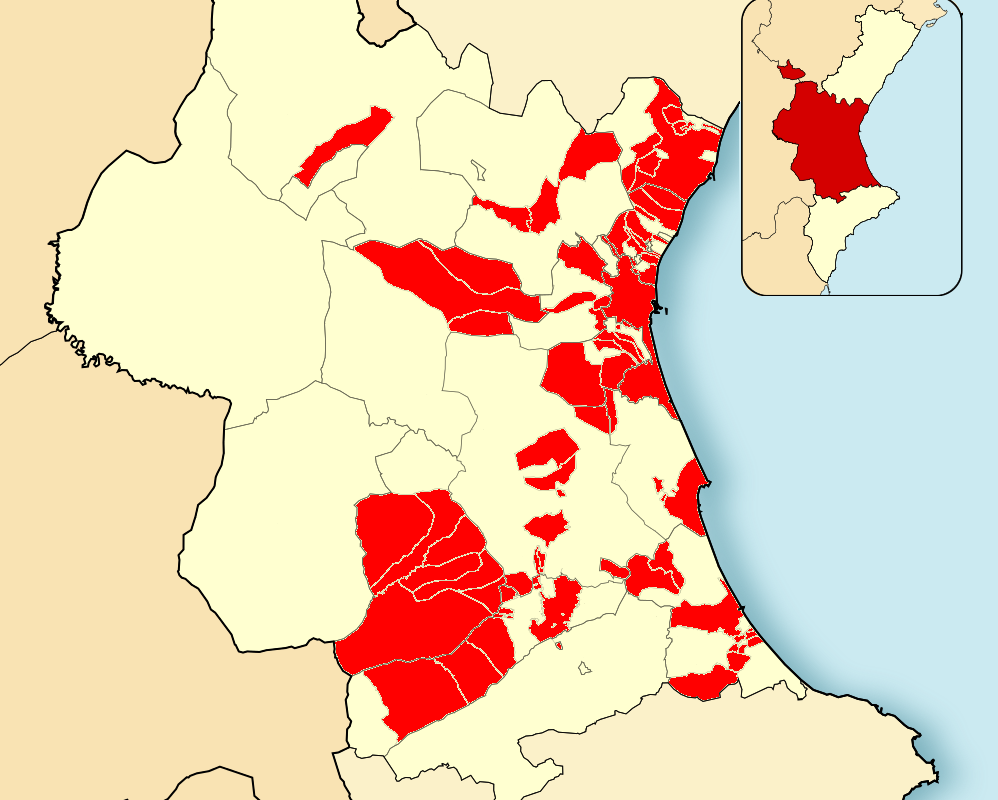
Some of the municipalities belonging to the Valencian Canton.

The Valencian Canton was made up mainly of municipalities of the province of Valencia, in the half closest to the coast . Some of the municipalities attached to the canton of Valencia were the following:

Albal, Albalat dels Sorells, Albalat de Taronchers, Alberique, Alboraya, Alcántara de Júcar, Alcudia de Carlet, Aldaya, Almusafes, Alquería de la Condesa, Anna, Bellreguart, Benaguacil, Benegida, Benetúser, Benifairó de la Valldigna, Benifaraig (currently integrated in the Valencian municipality), Benifayó, Benifairó de los Valles, Benifairó de la Valldigna, Bicorp, Bolbaite, Bonrepós (currently part of Bonrepós y Mirambell), Borbotó (currently a district of the Valencian municipality), Campanar (currently a neighborhood of Valencia), Carlet, Carpesa (district of Valencia), Catarroja, Cullera, Chella, Cheste, Chirivella, Chiva, Domeño, Enguera, Estubeny, Faura, Fortaleny, Foyos, Fuente Encarroz, Gandía, Gilet, Godelleta, Játiva, Masalfasar, Masanasa, Meliana, Miramar, Mogente, Moncada, Montesa, Museros, Navarrés, Oliva, Paterna, Picaña, Picasent, Piles, Puebla de Vallbona, Pueblo Nuevo del Mar (district of Poblados Marítimos of Valencia), El Puig, Puzol, Quesa, Cuart de les Valls, Rafelbuñol, Rafelcofer, Sagunto, Sedaví, Sellent, Serra, Silla, Simat de Valldigna, Tabernes Blanques, Vallada, Villalonga and Villanueva del Grao (currently integrated in the Valencian municipality as the Grao neighborhood).

== Sources ==
- Barón Fernández, José (1998). El movimiento cantonal de 1873 (1ª República) (in Spanish). Sada (A Coruña): Edicios do Castro. ISBN 84-7492-896-6.
