= Navalón =

Coordinates: 39.0222°N 0.6447°W

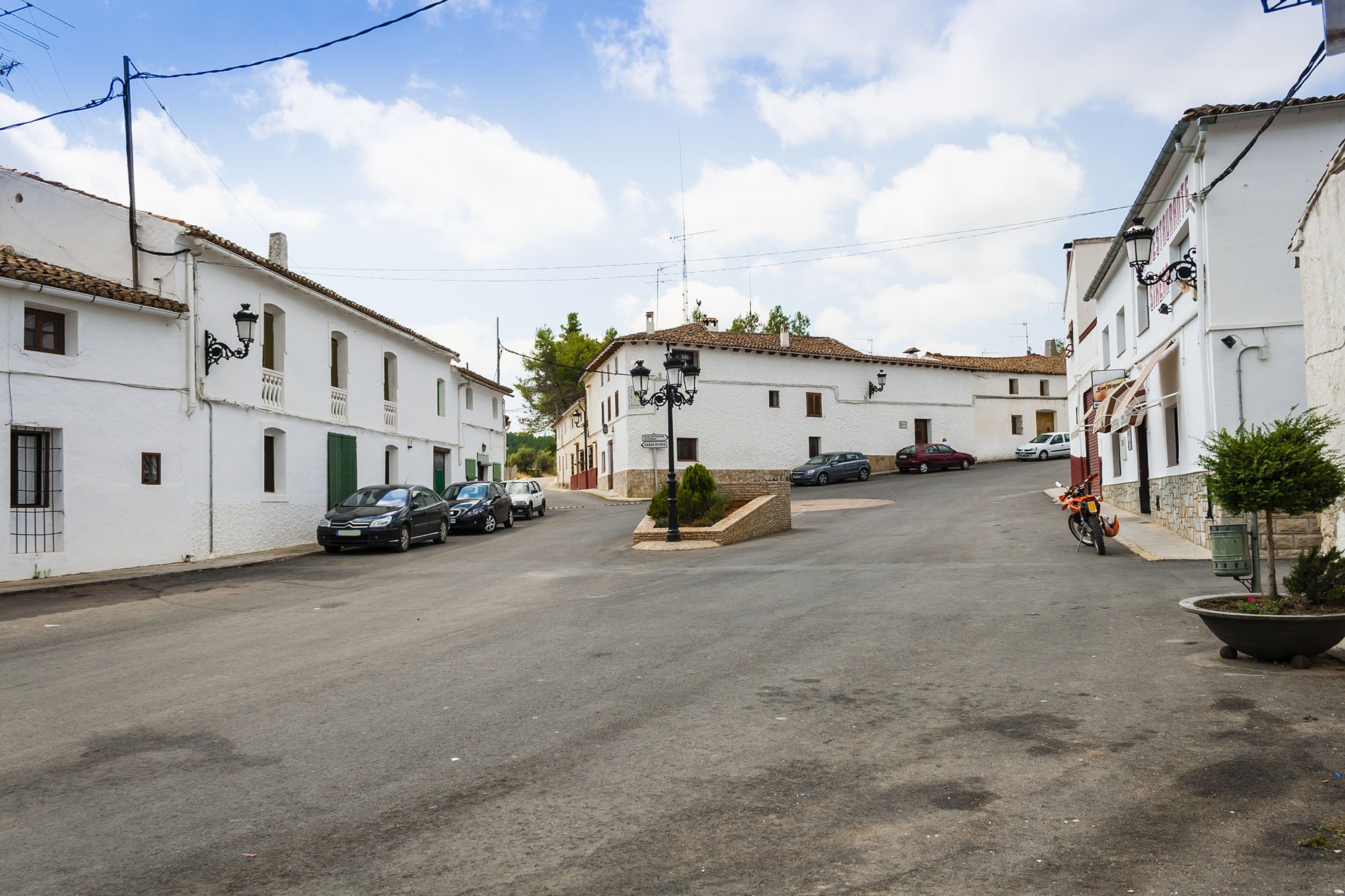
- Navalón Village
- Interactive map of Navalón
- Country: Spain
- Province: Valencia
- Municipality: Enguera
- Comarca: Canal de Navarrés
- Elevation: 776 m (2,546 ft)

Population (2015)
  - Total: 61

Navalón is a village in Valencia, Spain. It is part of the municipality of Enguera.
