= Roca dels Moros =

Cave and archaeological site in Spain

La Roca dels moros
UNESCO World Heritage Site
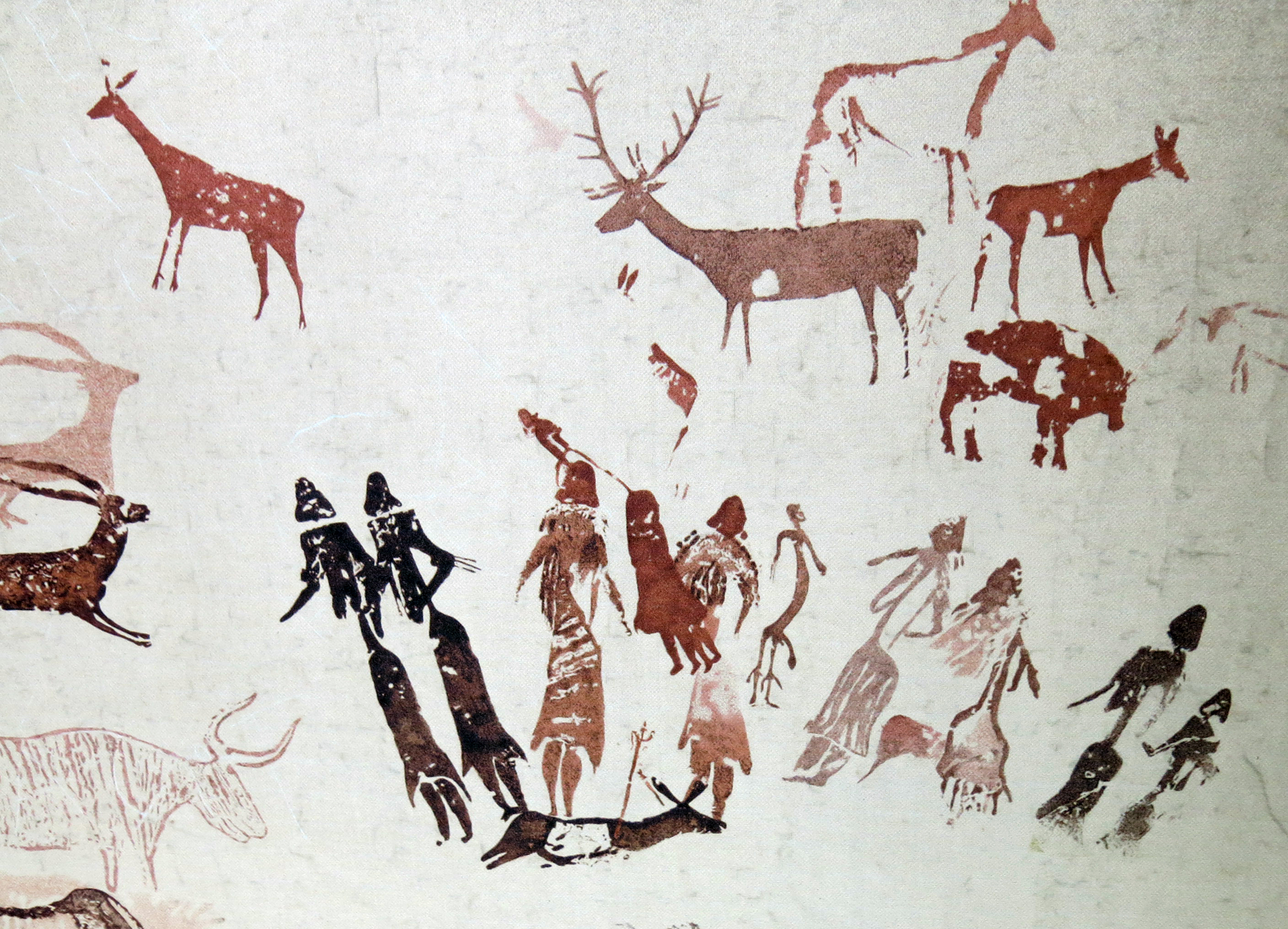
- The Dance of Cogul. Tracing by Henri Breuil.

- Location within Catalonia Location within Spain
- Location: El Cogul, Garrigues, Province of Lleida, Catalonia, Spain
- Part of: Rock Art of the Mediterranean Basin on the Iberian Peninsula
- Criteria: Cultural: (iii)
- Reference: 874-021
- Inscription: 1998 (22nd Session)
- Coordinates: 41°28′0.6″N 0°41′51.5″E

The Roca dels Moros or Caves of El Cogul is a rock shelter containing paintings of prehistoric Levantine rock art and Iberian schematic art. The site is in El Cogul, in the autonomous community of Catalonia, Spain. Since 1998 the paintings have been protected as part of the Rock art of the Iberian Mediterranean Basin, a UNESCO World Heritage Site. Inscriptions in Northeastern Iberian script and in Latin alphabet indicate that the place was used as a sanctuary into Iberian and Roman times.

== Location, discovery ==
The paintings were discovered in 1908 by the el Cogul village rector, Ramon Huguet, and a report was published in the same year. Since 1998 the paintings have been protected as part of a UNESCO World Heritage Site (reference 874). Inscriptions in Northeastern Iberian script and in Latin alphabet, one of which is an ex-voto, indicate that the use of the caves as a sanctuary extended to Iberian and Roman times.

== The Dancers of Cogul ==
At Roca dels Moros there are forty-five figures depicted, of which thirty-eight are painted bright red, black and dark red, seven are engraved in stone. A dance scene is the most famous of the painting. This scene is interpreted as nine women (something new in Spanish caves' painting at the age). The figures, believed to be women, are painted in black and others in red. They dance around what it looks to be a small/short black male figure/figurine at the center right of the composition with an abnormally large phallus, 'but also has anatomical oddities in its lower limbs that can throw the identification into doubt.' Along with the figures of the women, there are several animals.

Currently, different interpretations have been given as an alternative to the dancers with the purpose of celebrating a reproductive ceremony. These can perfectly be women with certain social status gathering to socialize, with their children in a meeting place. These women show friendship and affection toward each other. Felix Rodrigo Mora suggests these images may have been painted by women.

== Conservation ==
Conservation work has been carried out on the paintings under the auspices of the Museu d'Arqueologia de Catalunya. There is now a visitors centre to interpret the site and to promote Cogul in the context of a "route of rock art", linking it to similar sites in Catalonia.

== The Saladar tombs ==
Near the paintings is a cemetery with tombs carved into the rock called Saladar tombs.

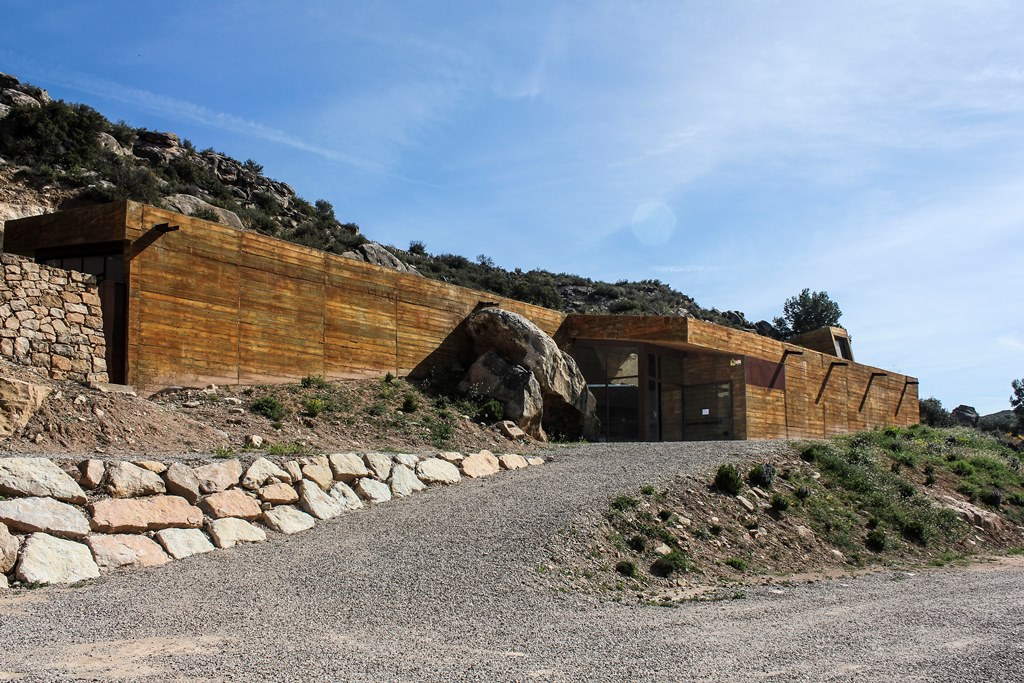
The visitors center

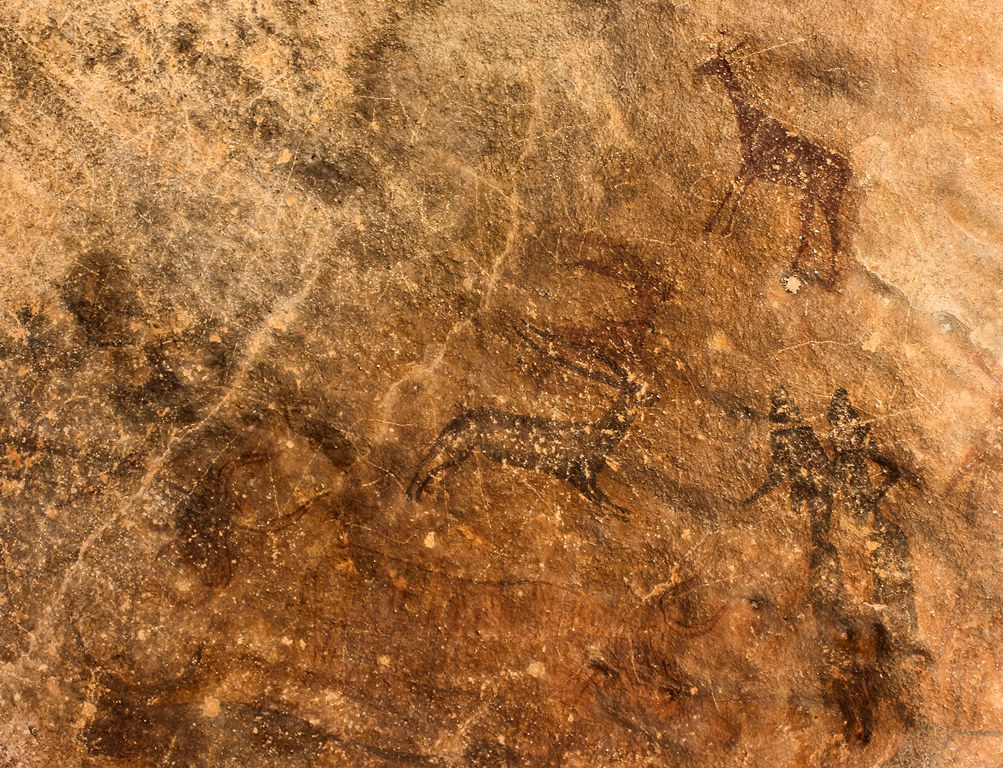
Cave painting of women with animals

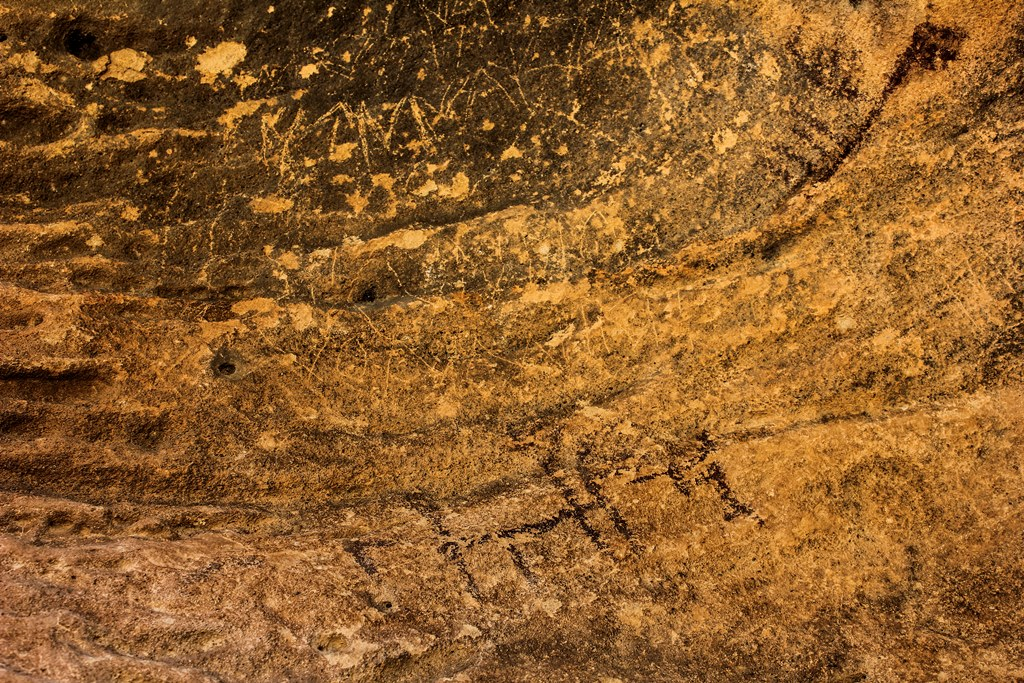
Inscriptions in Iberian script and Iberian schematic paintings

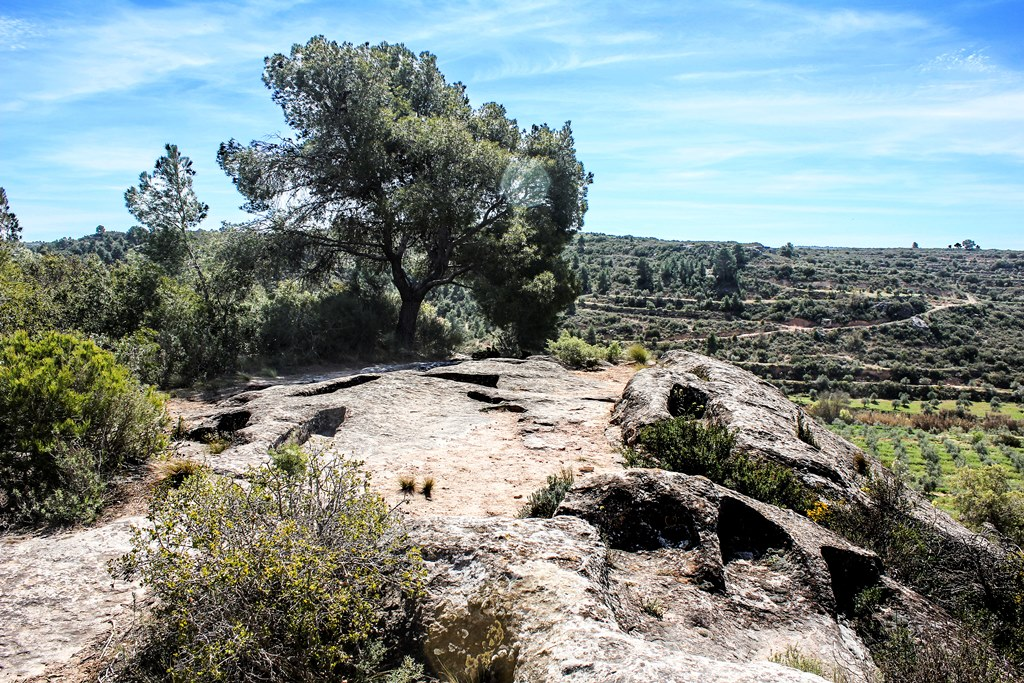
The Saladar tombs

== Bibliography ==
- (in Catalan) Volume I of the Història de Catalunya directed by Pierre Vilar: Prehistòria i història antiga, Joan Maluquer de Motes.
- (in Catalan) Anna Alonso Tejada, Alexandre Grimal Navarro (2007): L´Art Rupestre del Cogul. Primeres Imatges Humanes a Catalunya, Pagès Editors, Lleida, ISBN 978-84-9779-593-7.
- Alexandre GRIMAL, Anna ALONSO (2007): Catálogo de Cataluña, Cuenca, Albacete, Guadalajara y Andalucía ("Catalogue of Catalonia, Cuenca, Albacete, Guadalajara and Andalucia") from Catálogo del Arte Rupestre Prehistórico de la Península Ibérica y de la España Insular. Arte Levantino ("Catalogue of prehistoric rock art of the Iberian Peninsula and the Spanish Islands. Levantine Art"), Real Academia de Cultura Valenciana, Archaeological Series, nº 22, Valencia, I-II Vols, pp. 113–252 (Vol I), pp. 41–85 (Vol II). ISBN 978-84-96068-84-1.
- (in Catalan) Anna ALONSO TEJADA, Alexandre GRIMAL (2003): L´art rupestre prehistòric a la comarca de les Garrigues, III Trobada d´Estudiosos de la Comarca de les Garrigues, Ajuntament de Cervià de les Garrigues (Lleida), pp. 17–25.
