= Millars =

Millars may refer to:

- Millars or Mijares River in Aragon and the Valencian Community
- Millars or Millares town in the comarca of Canal de Navarrés, Valencian Community
- Millars or Millas commune in the Pyrénées-Orientales department
- Millars Corners, a community in North Grenville, Ontario
- Millars (company), Australian timber company
