= Chella, Spain =

Chella
- Municipality
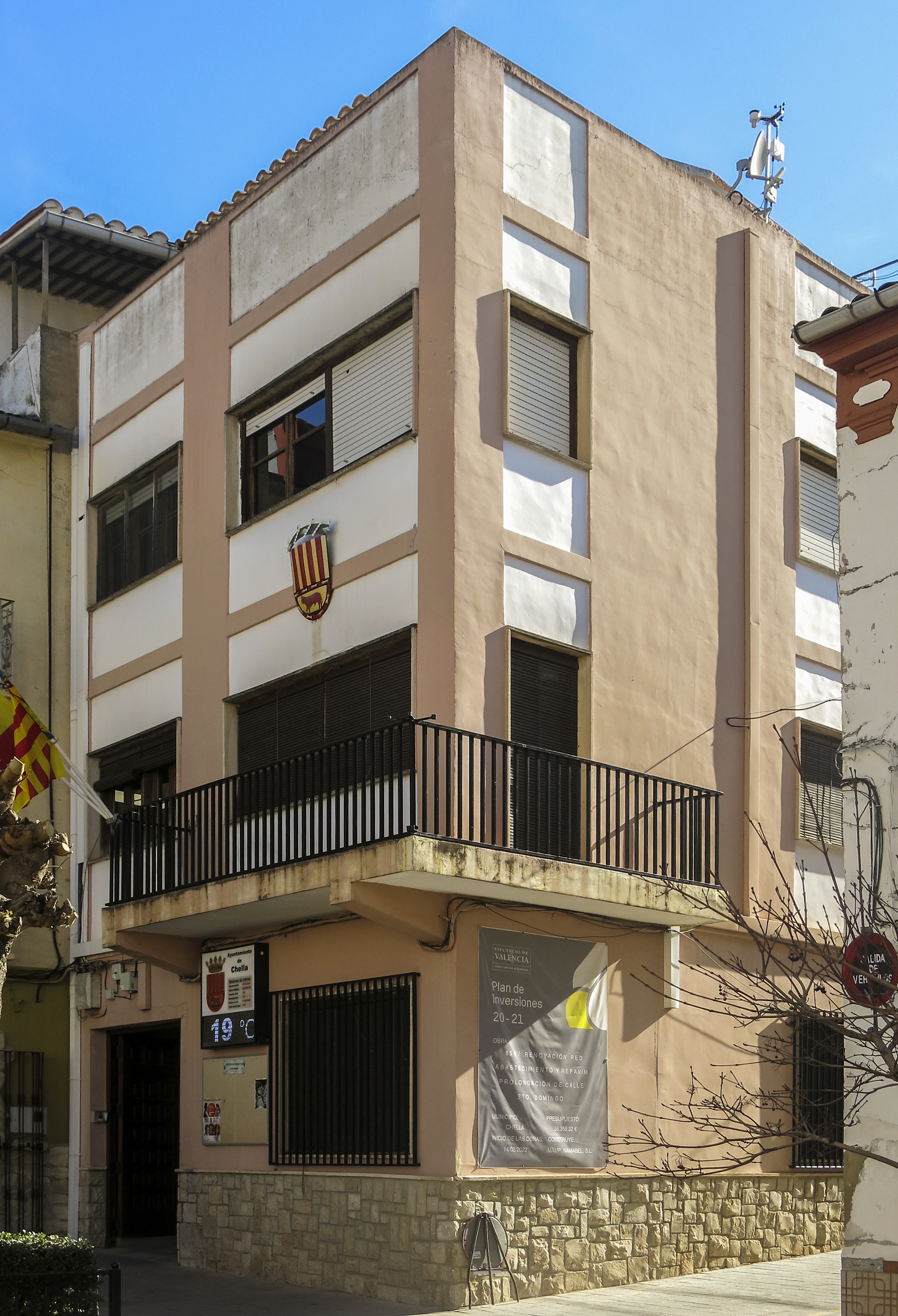
- Town hall

- Coat of arms

- Location in Spain
- Coordinates: 39°2′40″N 0°39′38″W
- Country: Spain
- Autonomous community: Valencian Community
- Province: Valencia
- Comarca: Canal de Navarrés
- Judicial district: Xàtiva

Government
  - Alcalde: José Enrique Talón Seguí (2015) (PSPV-PSOE)

Area
  - Total: 43.5 km^{2} (16.8 sq mi)
- Elevation: 219 m (719 ft)

Population (2025-01-01)
  - Total: 2,452
  - Density: 56.4/km^{2} (146/sq mi)
- Demonym(s): Chellino, chellina
- Time zone: UTC+1 (CET)
  - Summer (DST): UTC+2 (CEST)
- Postal code: 46821
- Official language(s): Spanish
- Website: Official website

Chella is a municipality in the comarca of Canal de Navarrés in the Valencian Community, Spain.

== Neighboring localities ==
The municipal territory of is close to that of the following municipalities: Anna, Bolbaite, Cotes, Enguera, Enguera, Navarrés, Sellent, Estubeny and Sumacàrcer all located in the province of Valencia.

== History ==
Chella is of great archaeological interest and is well known through various explorations and surveys.

Ceramics and flints have been found showing a long human occupation, from the Mesolithic to the early age of the metal. From the Neolithic, vestiges are also present.

From the Iberian period, there was an abundant ceramic painted geometric decoration and fragments of vases black varnish. Nearby, in a northwestern ravine, two slabs serving as a bridge seem to be vestiges of the threshold of a Roman house.

In the Muslim era, Chella was a farm that James I of Aragon donated to Pere Dovit, although he later returned to the crown. In 1341, the king gave it to Tomás de Ulmis, who passed it in 1356 to the count of Denia and later to the duchy of Gandia. In 1611, Carlos of Borja published a mapping of the population after the expulsion of the Moriscos. Later, it belonged to the Marquis de Bélgida.

Despite the existence of archaeological remains of an Iberian village, located in Los Secanos de Arriba, as well as a Roman farmhouse in the current house of Fulgencio and remains Muslim remains that lived in spaces the caves of Peña del Turco, the current municipality of Chella has its origin in a Muslim farm, located in the current square of the old church, where there is still a part of the wall of the mosque which is currently a niche with the Virgin of Gracia patron saint of the town.

In 1244, James I of Aragon conquered the region and rebelled against Al-Azraq, a Muslim ruler, and against the inhabitants of Chella. After being defeated, they were expelled, repopulating the commune with Muslims loyal to the king. The population was given in stronghold successively to Thomas de Ulmis, the Count of Denia, Pedro Escintelles and the first Duke of Gandia (Alfonso el Vell), and after his death returned to the Crown.

During the Germanías, the Moors of Chella were forced to be baptized and the parish of Bolbaite dismembered from that of Chella.

With Carlos of Borja, he returned to the hands of the dukes of Gandia and the counts of Oliva; and in 1609 Philip III (King of Spain) ordered the expulsion of the Moors and Chella was completely abandoned until 1611. It was then that the letter was granted and the new settlers (Llobregat, Granero, Garcia Esparza, Palop, etc.) were installed.

During this century, the population is growing; the remains of the Muslim castle remain in the upper part, today the district of La Peña. This development is consolidated in the eighteenth century, when the feudal lords are no longer the Borja, but the Marquis de Bélgida. In the war of succession Chella ceases to belong to the government of Xàtiva and enter the village of Montesa with the neighboring municipalities of Anna, Enguera and Estubeny. All these cities were affected by the earthquake of 23 March 1748, which destroyed the old church of Chella, thus accelerating the construction of the new (1763) neoclassical style and Latin cross with bell-shaped corners towards the cardinal points, turn and that it keeps its first bell Maria de Gracia dating from 1789.

During the same century the transformation of dry lands in the orchard, thanks to the discovery of a new source (Le Abrullador) thanks to the examination of Cabanilles has generated significant economic growth.

In the nineteenth century, when territorial lordships disappeared, Chella became a municipality in the municipal sense. In the Madoz census of 1840, the population was 1200 inhabitants, whose economy was based on the cultivation of wheat, corn, barley and the production of oil, wine and silk. During the restoration, the agricultural social structure was made up of small and medium-sized landowners and day laborers, which led to the appearance of "caciquism" (the name given to all the political relations that animated the years of the Restoration of the Bourbons in Spain (1874–1931)).

There is a legend, with romantic hues, that El Chato, a true character in the service of caciquism, became a rodero (bandit) after a disappointment in love.

The phylloxera (destructive vine aphid) has brought about the end of vineyard cultivation and wine production. This caused many emigrations in Argentina or Algeria (Sidi Bel Abbès) and the extension of the olive growing.

Since the time of the Republic and the civil war, stands in the barracks of Paterna, the figure of Carlos Fabra Marin (07/02 / 1904-6 / 7/1970), Republican sergeant who aborted, at night on 29 July, with his aide-de-camp and his only pistol (a 9-millimeter Bergman), the seditious military uprising in Valencia. The shooting left 3 dead and several wounded. This intervention was decisive to avoid the military rebellion of Valencia against the Second Republic. He was decorated for this action by General José Miaja.

Passing captain in 1937, remaining close to general José Miaja and the republican government in Valencia, he decided to send the family (wife, son and daughter) in 1938 to France and joined his family in exile in France on 2 March 1939 and helped many migrant families in the years 1950–1960.

Arrested during the German occupation, he was taken prisoner at the Vernet camp of Ariège in the Pyrenees.

During the dictatorship of Francisco Franco, he was condemned to ostracism by the inhabitants and related political parties, until his heroic history was found through essays and publications. Since then, a street in Chella has been awarded. His direct descendants still live in Chella as well as in France where he died on 6 July 1970 without having seen his native country again. First buried in St-Denis near Paris, his remains were in 1986 repatriated to Chella (paid by the City Council of Valencia), during the commemoration of the 50 years of the end of the Civil War, where a tribute was paid to him by the veterans still alive and many associations.

A tribute to his heroic intervention was delivered by Paterna City Council in 2006.

With the arrival of democracy and the return of emigrants, the economy has improved. The labor force moved out of the agricultural sector into construction and services. Domestic manufacture and the development of caliqueños cigars constituted a submerged economy, which employed mainly women's work.

Currently, urban development continues along the same routes: Higueral, Carlos Fabra, Federico Granero, Blasco Ibáñez, Miguel Hernández, La Paz and Valeriano Bellver streets, and Avenida de Santa the Constitution, which has ceased to be an urban transit because of the hijacking of the road. In the direction of Bolbaite (Bolbait in Catalan), the city has expanded with the industrial zone, articulated around the street of the First May, whose crossings take the name of the rural areas of the term. For a decade, the population has increased with the arrival of people coming mainly from Eastern Europe, Maghreb and Great Britain, which opens a new stage of coexistence.

== Demography ==
Demographic evolution
1990	1992	1994	1996	1998	2000	2002	2004	2005	2006	2008	2013	2018
2.590	2.531	2.549	2.539	2.525	2.527	2.566	2.618	2.666	2.701	2.860	2.752	2.649

== Administration ==
List of mayors since the first democratic elections.

Legislature	Mayor's name	Political party
1979–1983	Juan Martínez Granero	UCD
1983–1987	Juan Martínez Granero	AP-PDP-UL-UV
1987–1991	José Agustín Talón Ballester	PSPV-PSOE
1991–1995	Andrés Fernández Orts	PSPV-PSOE
1995–1999	Vicente Coloma Granero	PP
1999–2003	Vicente Coloma Granero	PP
2003–2007	Pablo Seguí Granero	PSPV-PSOE
2007–2011	Pablo Seguí Granero	PSPV-PSOE
2011–2015	Pablo Seguí Granero	PSPV-PSOE
2015–2019	José Enrique Talón Seguí	PSPV-PSOE

== Economy ==
Traditionally based on agriculture.

In irrigated areas, garlic, wheat, maize, peanuts, onions, tobacco and fruit trees are grown. In dry land, olives, almonds, grapes and carob are harvested. In Chella, they are undoubtedly distinguished above all by artisanal products such as the famous Caliqueño cigars, bobbin lace. The stone is also worked (facades, chimneys, paths, etc.), which is one of its main activities

== Patrimony ==
- The parish church of the Virgin of Grace, rebuilt in the eighteenth century, is currently being examined by experts of the dome, because it could have been designed by Gaudí.
- Hermitage of San Nicolás.
- Manor of the Counts of Buñol.
- Ancient Arab mosque.
- The "Castillets", vestiges of Arab origin.

== Natural sites and sources ==
- Ruins of the source and wash house of Mirador del Salto.
- The Mirador del Salto with risk of detachment.
- The jump (El Salto).
- Barranco del "Zarzalet" where there is an old cave to keep cattle and a fountain.
- At the source of the "Abrullador" located at five kilometers of the municipality, is the spring that feeds Chella in water, following the channel that leads to the gorge of "Abrullador": "Los Molinicos" and " Playa Salvaje ".
- Laundry, in the park area.
- The source plane trees (los Chopos).
- "Clochicas" and "El Abogao" are other sources that are also found in the term.
- In the northern part of the term, there are still the remains of what was once a hot spring thermal and medicinal waters.

== Recreational areas ==
- Parque de la Fuente on the banks of the river Sellent, a footbridge with benches, a green area, a children's park and a part dedicated to the realization of festivals, concerts and public events, services.
- Parque de la Ermita, with an adult sports ground, a petanque area, a green area with benches, a fountain and a playground for children.
- Plaza Parque Párroco Don Julio, equipped with benches with a small playground.
- El Paseo, located in the center of the municipality, area with benches, two fountains and playground.

== Sports facilities ==
- The versatile Parque de la Fuente, equipped for playing football and basketball, has changing rooms.
- Public swimming pool adapted for people with reduced mobility with changing rooms.
- Tennis
- Paddle field
- Artificial turf football pitch with locker rooms.

== Festivities ==
- Festivities of the patronal festivals ( 'Fiestas Patronales)' in honor of San Blas and Christ of the Refuge, 2–3 and 4 February. The first day of the festivities is celebrated the procession in honor of San Fumat. This procession begins at dawn when the festival ends and everyone has to go disguised and with a caliqueño.
- Festivals of the cultural week ( 'Fiestas of Semana Cultural)' . They take place the first week of August and include paella contests, musical performances, theater, storytelling, DJ concentration, sports championships, drawing contests, etc. and presentation of the festivities of the following year.
- Festivals of the Moors and Christians ( 'Fiestas de Moros y Cristianos)' . The week-end after the cultural week, the acts of the Moors and Christians end with the dinner-gathering of the stooges on Friday evening and parades in the commune, on Saturday the false entry and Sunday, the official entry.
- Feast of Santicos de la Piedra street ( 'Festividad calle Santicos de la Piedra)' The neighbors of the city go to Mass and make a parade with the saint. The neighbors of this street, leave their house and make a dinner in their street, in which they invite all the population.
- Festival of San Roque ( 'Festividad de San Roque)' The neighbors of the city go to mass and make a parade with the saint. The neighbors of this street, leave their house and make a dinner in their street, in which they invite all the population.
- Feast of the Virgin of Grace '(Festividad de la Virgen de Gracia)' It is celebrated on 8 September, but lasts a whole weekend. Friday, a dinner is prepared in the Park of the Fuente, where meet all the elders of the city, with a musical show. Saturday afternoon, a parade is organized with the party-goers dressed in "chellino", the typical costume of the city. Then they go to Mass and an offering is made. When they leave Mass, they parade, go to the old church street and make another offering, then prepare a snack for the old and retired people of the city. At the end of the afternoon tea, they go to Paseo, where popular dances are danced. Sunday morning, a mass is celebrated where the revelers are dressed in chellino. At the end of the mass, a parade takes place in the city. In the afternoon, a procession is organized, where the revelers are dressed in gala dress, at the end of the procession there is a fireworks display.
- Fallas Festival, is one of the most ingrained festivals of the municipality. It was founded in the summer of 1982 and began in March 1983, it is celebrated from 15 to 19 March
- Festival of St. Nicholas '(Festividad de San Nicolás)' It is celebrated on 6 December, at this evening, a parade is organized in which everyone is dressed in gala dress. The next day, they make a chocolate for all gourmands. A mass is also celebrated and a procession in his honor.
- Cavalcade of the Three Kings ( 'Cabalgata de los Reyes Magos)' It takes place in the afternoon / night of 5 January. The children go to Carlos Fabra Park, write the letter to the kings and take pictures with them. Then they follow the circuit where there is music, fairies, pages ... At the end of the tour, they return to the park Carlos Fabrak and dismiss the kings, who climb the mountain and disappear with a star ...

== Gastronomy ==
Specialty of baked rice and "arroz caldós", "casolica de pencas", stew and gaspacho with manchego.

Among the desserts stand out: the "torticas" of peanuts and oil of San Blas, the "bizcochás", the "rollicos de anís", the "pastissets of moniato", the "pastissets of rosillas", the "torta" in llanda ", the" almendrones "", "rossegones" and for all the saints, they become "hogassas".

== Notable people ==
- José Carlos Granero is a Spanish retired footballer who played as a right back or a central defender, and a current manager.

== See also ==
- List of municipalities in Valencia
