= Villar del Humo =

Villar del Humo, Spain
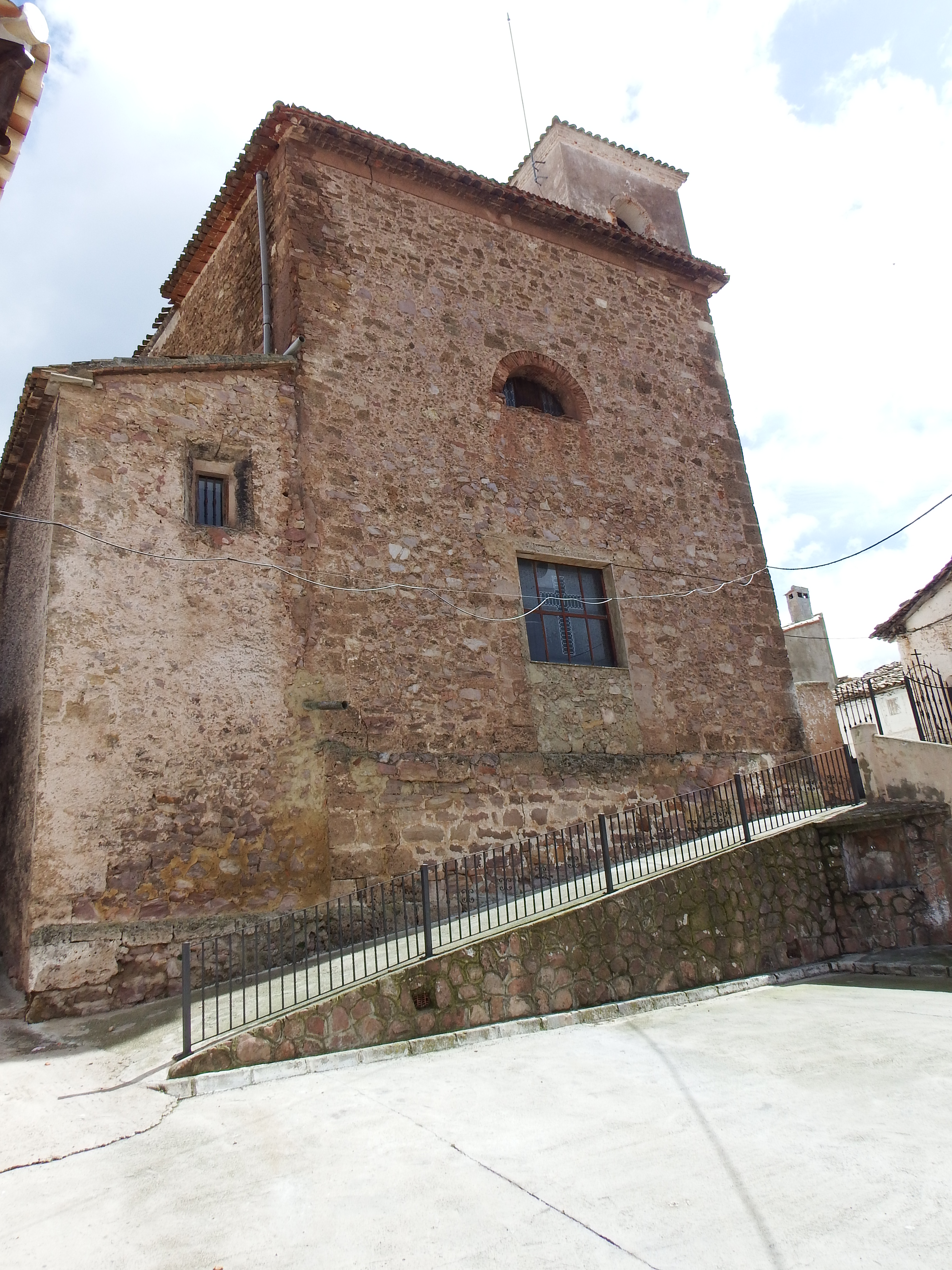

- Location within Spain Location within Castilla-La Mancha
- Coordinates: 39°52′N 1°38′W
- Country: Spain
- Autonomous community: Castile-La Mancha
- Province: Cuenca
- Municipality: Villar del Humo

Area
  - Total: 150 km^{2} (58 sq mi)
- Elevation: 989 m (3,245 ft)

Population (2025-01-01)
  - Total: 182
  - Density: 1.2/km^{2} (3.1/sq mi)
- Time zone: UTC+1 (CET)
  - Summer (DST): UTC+2 (CEST)

Villar del Humo is a municipality in the province of Cuenca, Castile-La Mancha, Spain. According to the 2004 census (INE), the municipality has a population of 372 inhabitants.

It is an important location for prehistoric rock art. A cultural park has been designated to conserve the sites and they have also been included in the World Heritage Site Rock Art of the Iberian Mediterranean Basin.
