= Cuevas de la Araña =

Caves and archaeological site in Spain

Cova de l'Aranya
UNESCO World Heritage Site
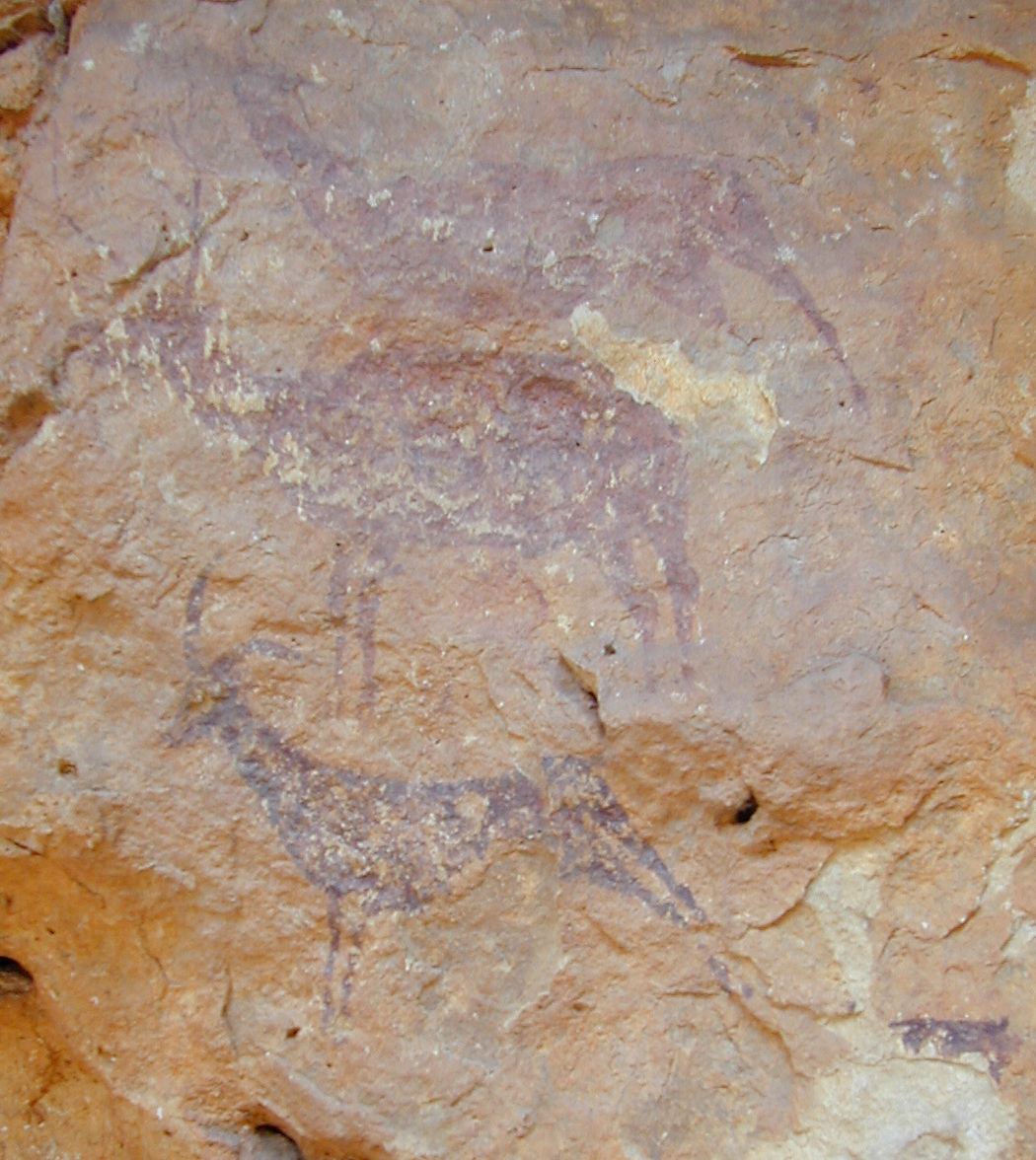

- Location within Valencian Community Location within Spain
- Location: Bicorp, Valencian Community, Spain
- Part of: Rock Art of the Mediterranean Basin on the Iberian Peninsula
- Includes: 394 (Abrigo I); 396 (Abrigo II); 397 (Abrigo III)
- Criteria: Cultural: (iii)
- Reference: 874
- Coordinates: 39°06′37.2″N 0°51′37.1″W

The Coves de l'Aranya (in original Catalan language, known in English as the Spider Caves and in Spanish Cuevas de la Araña) are a group of caves in the municipality of Bicorp in València, eastern Spain. The caves are in the valley of the river Escalona and were used by prehistoric people who left rock art. They are known for painted images of a bow and arrow goat hunt and for a scene depicting a human figure foraging honey, the earliest known depiction of bees and the oldest evidence of honey consumption by Homo sapiens.

A human figure holding onto lianas to gather honey from a beehive as depicted on an 8000-year-old cave painting near Valencia, Spain

The dating of such art is controversial, but the famous honey-gathering painting is believed to be epipaleolithic and is estimated to be around 8000 years old.

The caves were discovered in the early twentieth century by a local teacher, Jaume Garí i Poch. They are included in the World Heritage Site Rock art of the Iberian Mediterranean Basin.
