= Rock art of the Iberian Mediterranean Basin =

World Heritage Site in Spain

Rock Art of the Mediterranean Basin on the Iberian Peninsula
UNESCO World Heritage Site
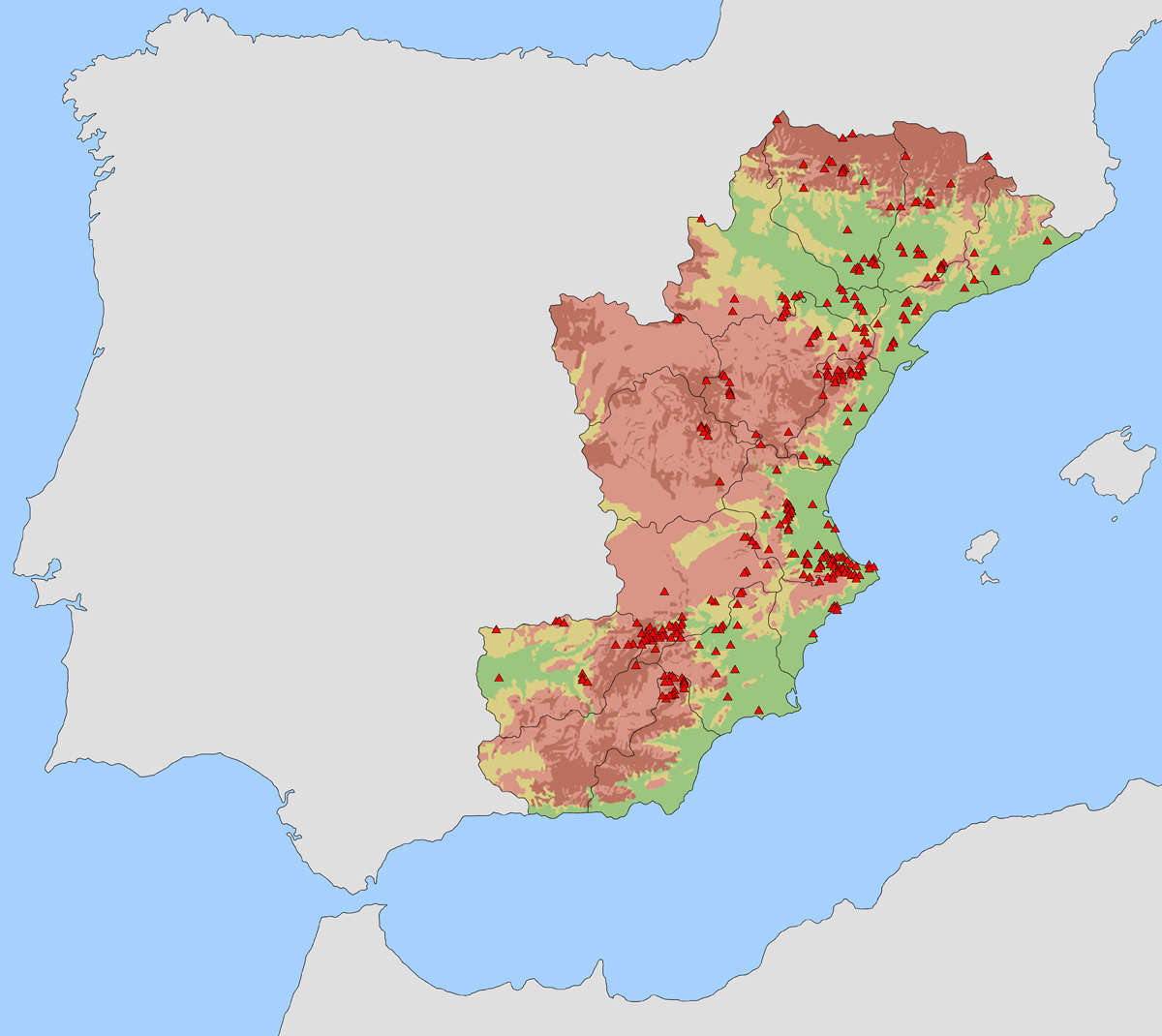
- Location of sites belonging to the Rock Art of the Mediterranean Basin on the Iberian Peninsula.

- Location within Earth
- Location: Spain
- Criteria: Cultural: (iii)
- Reference: 874
- Inscription: 1998 (22nd Session)
- Coordinates: 39°47′24″N 1°02′00″W

Person gathering honey, from the Cuevas de la Araña, Bicorp

The group of over 700 sites of prehistoric Rock Art of the Iberian Mediterranean Basin, a type of Levantine art, were collectively declared a World Heritage Site by UNESCO in 1998. The sites are in the eastern part of Spain and contain rock art dating to the Upper Paleolithic or (more likely) Mesolithic periods of the Stone Age. The art consists of small painted figures of humans and animals, which are the most advanced and widespread surviving from this period, certainly in Europe, and arguably in the world, at least in the earlier works. It is notable for the number of places included, the largest concentration of such art in Europe. Its name refers to the Mediterranean Basin; however, while some sites are located near the sea, many of them are inland in Aragon and Castilla–La Mancha; it can be classified as Levantine art (meaning "from Eastern Spain", not the Levant region).

== Historical period ==
There has been much debate over the dating of Levantine paintings, and whether they belong to the Mesolithic, the end of the Paleolithic, or the Neolithic; they clearly represent a very different style from the much more famous Art of the Upper Paleolithic in caves on either side of the Pyrenees, but yet may well show continuity with it. According to UNESCO, the oldest art in the World Heritage Site is from 8,000 BC, and the most recent examples from around 3500 BC. The art therefore spans a period of cultural change. It reflects the life of people using primarily hunter-gatherer economic systems, "who gradually incorporated Neolithic elements into their cultural baggage". Later scenes show men leading horses, and some cattle shown may be domesticated. The chronology of Levantine art overlaps with that of Iberian schematic art, and examples of both types of art can be found at some sites. Equally some sites continued to attract visitors in later periods, as shown by inscriptions in the Iberian language and Latin, for example at the Caves of El Cogul; these may have been associated with repainting of figures.

The paintings seem to have been produced after an influx of population from North Africa had mixed with the populations remaining from earlier periods in Iberia.

== Discovery ==
Levantine Art was first discovered in Teruel in 1903. The Spanish prehistorian Juan Cabre was the first to study this art, defining it as a regional Palaeolithic art. Assessment as Palaeolithic was challenged for various reasons including the fact that no glacial fauna was depicted. Antonio Beltrán Martínez and others place the beginning of this art in the Epipaleolithic or Mesolithic, placing its heyday in the Neolithic period. Accepting a post-Paleolithic age for the art, Ripio devised a new chronological scheme in the 1960s, dividing the art into four stages:naturalistic, stylized static, stylized dynamic, and final phase of transition to the schematic.

== Characteristics ==
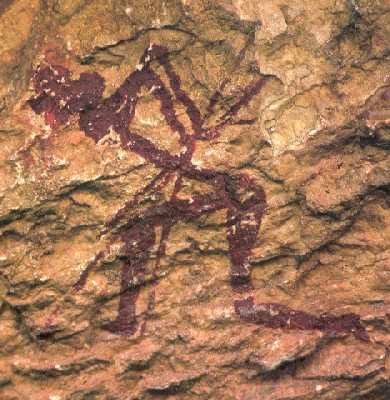
Figure from Valltorta

The art appears over a wide area, and was created over a period of several thousand years; it is widely accepted that it shows stylistic and thematic development that reflects a long evolution, at least some local variety, and changes in way of life, though agreement on the details of this development is a continuing process.

=== Painting techniques ===
The artists appear to have used feathers, in a relatively complex painting technique, compared to the art of the Upper Paleolithic, that produced relatively simple figures. Figures are often outlined, apparently after the main body was painted. Some figures are shallowly engraved rather than painted. The figures are relatively small, between about 8 and 1 inch (20.3 and 2.5 centimetres) high, and in one or two colours. The paint was generally very thin, using mineral earths (often reddish) or charcoal, and the paintings are preserved by a very thin transparent layer of limescale forming over them from water dripping down the wall. Some figures have more than one coat of paint, which has led to claims that they were repainted after long periods, though this seems not universally accepted.

=== Humans ===
The human figure, which is rare in Paleolithic art, acquires great importance in Levantine Art. The human figure is frequently the main theme, and when it appears in the same scene as animals, the human figure runs towards them. The painting known as The Dancers of Cogul is a good example of movement being depicted. The most common scenes by far are of hunting, and there are scenes of battle and dancing, and possibly agricultural tasks and managing domesticated animals. In some scenes gathering honey is shown, most famously at Cuevas de la Araña (illustrated below). Humans are naked from the waist up, but women have skirts and men sometimes skirts or gaiters or trousers of some sort, and headdresses and masks are sometimes seen, which may indicate rank or status in a way compared by one researcher to North American Plains Indians; figures sometimes seem to have a deliberate element of caricature. Some war scenes distinguish between the sides in terms of physical appearance, or dress and weapons, though the interpretation of this is uncertain. Within one side, figures of greater importance may be indicated by more carefully painted figures with "exaggerated calf muscles and elongated thighs", or by pantaloons that are "tufted" at the ankle; the ordinary "infantry" are shown as mere "stick figures".

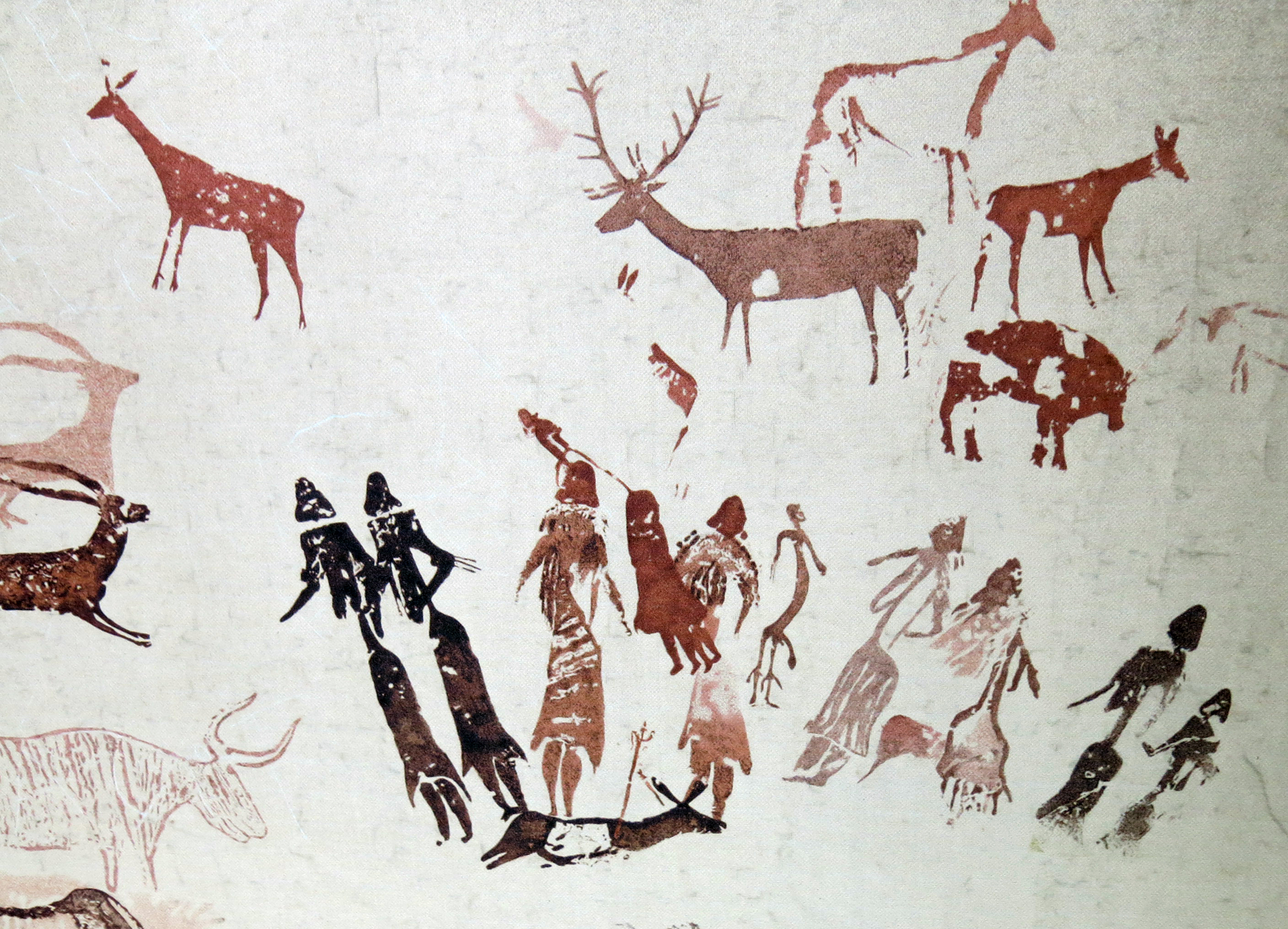
The Dance of Cogul, tracing by Henri Breuil

There is a much better developed sense of composition in group subjects than in Paleolithic art, and animals running are shown in the "flying gallop" convention that would last in art until after the invention of photography. Human figures are also shown with very wide strides, or in a "flying running" posture with legs up to 180 degrees apart. The scenes depicted are often moments of drama; dead and dying men and animals are often shown, and sometimes battles between humans, which can include up to 44 figures. Scenes of human execution by archers, and in one case by hanging, can also be seen; these scenes of conflict seem to come from the later periods of painting, and from a more limited area "around the Gasulla and Valltota gorges" in the province of Castellón.

The archer's bow is given great prominence, as the top weapon of the period; some bows are very large. To solve the problem of how to convey the distance between an archer and his distant prey, some sites use a convention of showing the trail of the hunted animal, a sophisticated and effective solution. Some scenes with numbers of armed men appear to represent dances, and women are also shown dancing in other scenes, which they seem to have done with their feet still and using only arm and upper-body movements. A famous dance scene at the Caves of El Cogul shows eleven women in skirts circling a naked man shown with an erect phallus.

In the representation of the human body there are drawings of heads with certain characteristics: the pear-shaped, hemispherical and conical. The top half of the human body is shown naked. Sometimes a kind of trousers are worn; sometimes the genitals are seen and there are phallic representations. The tools represented in Levantine Art are usually arrows, sticks, quivers and bags, and ropes, perhaps used as lassos or trip-ropes. These objects are always associated with the human figure, except for arrows, which may appear lying around as though shots that missed.

=== Environment and fauna ===
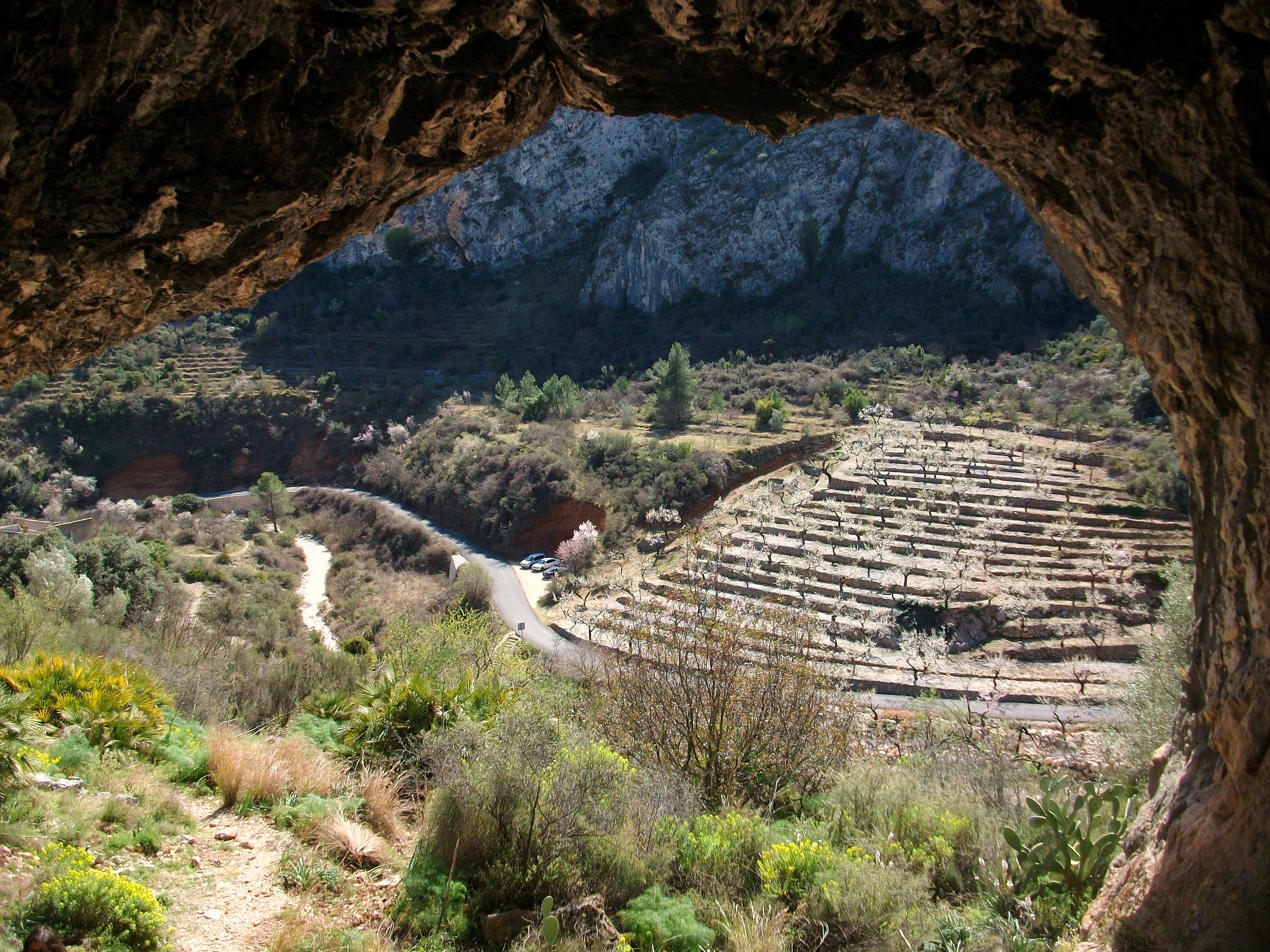
View from inside a cave, showing a typical setting in a narrow valley

There is no depiction of landscape, and very little treatment of vegetation. An interesting exception is a depiction of mushrooms (possibly Psilocybe hispanica) at Selva Pascuala. Animals, however, are very often represented, especially large mammals that are suitable prey for hunting, or that became domesticated (though they may not have been so yet); birds, fish (even near the coast) and insects are rarely shown, apart from the occasional spider and bees in honey-gathering. Some of the animals depicted are identifiable as belonging to species we can see in the present day, and the relative frequency of animal species shown has been used as evidence for dating. Some animals have been interpreted as exotic Ice Age species now extinct in Europe, but this is controversial. Some animals appear to have been overpainted to change their species, perhaps reflecting changes in fauna. The main species shown include:

- deer,
- goats, the animal most frequently depicted in the illustrations.
- boar
- cattle, often difficult to interpret; bulls are often hunted, but others may be domesticated. There is a bull that is possibly an aurochs at Selva Pascuala.
- dogs, rarely depicted, but they appear to help in a hunting scene at Barranc de la Palla.

Animals appear singly or in groups. A curious feature of the representation of animals is that they are generally drawn in profile but with horns and hooves at the front.

The paintings may have meanings related to religion or at least "hunting magic", though it is also possible to see them as purely celebrations of a way of life, though including depictions of ceremonies that are religious.

=== Warfare ===
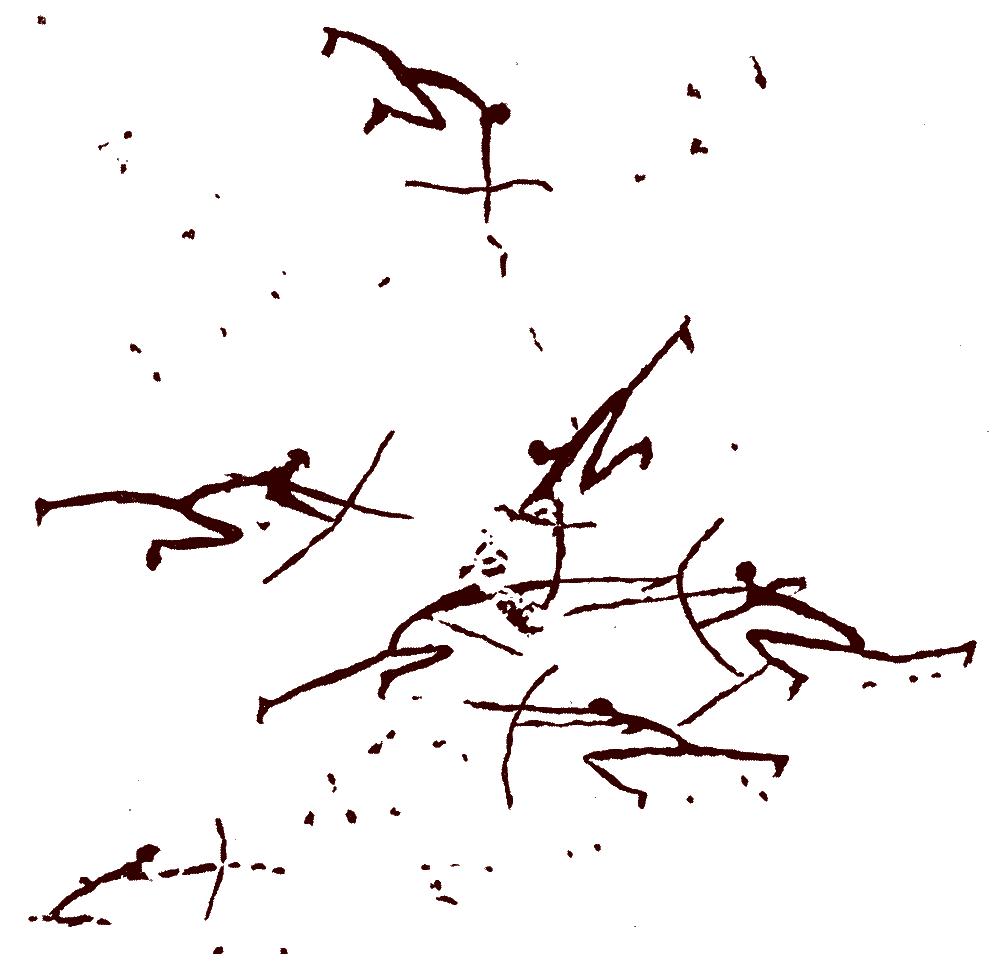
Cave painting of a battle between archers, Morella la Vella, Spain.

Iberian cave art of the Mesolithic shows explicit scenes of battle between groups of archers. A group of three archers encircled by a group of four is found in Cova del Roure, Morella la Vella, Castellón, Valencia. A depiction of a larger battle (which may, however, date to the early Neolithic), in which eleven archers are attacked by seventeen running archers, is found in Les Dogue, Ares del Maestrat, Castellón, Valencia. At Val del Charco del Agua Amarga, Alcañiz, Aragon, seven archers with plumes on their heads are fleeing a group of eight archers running in pursuit.

== Location ==
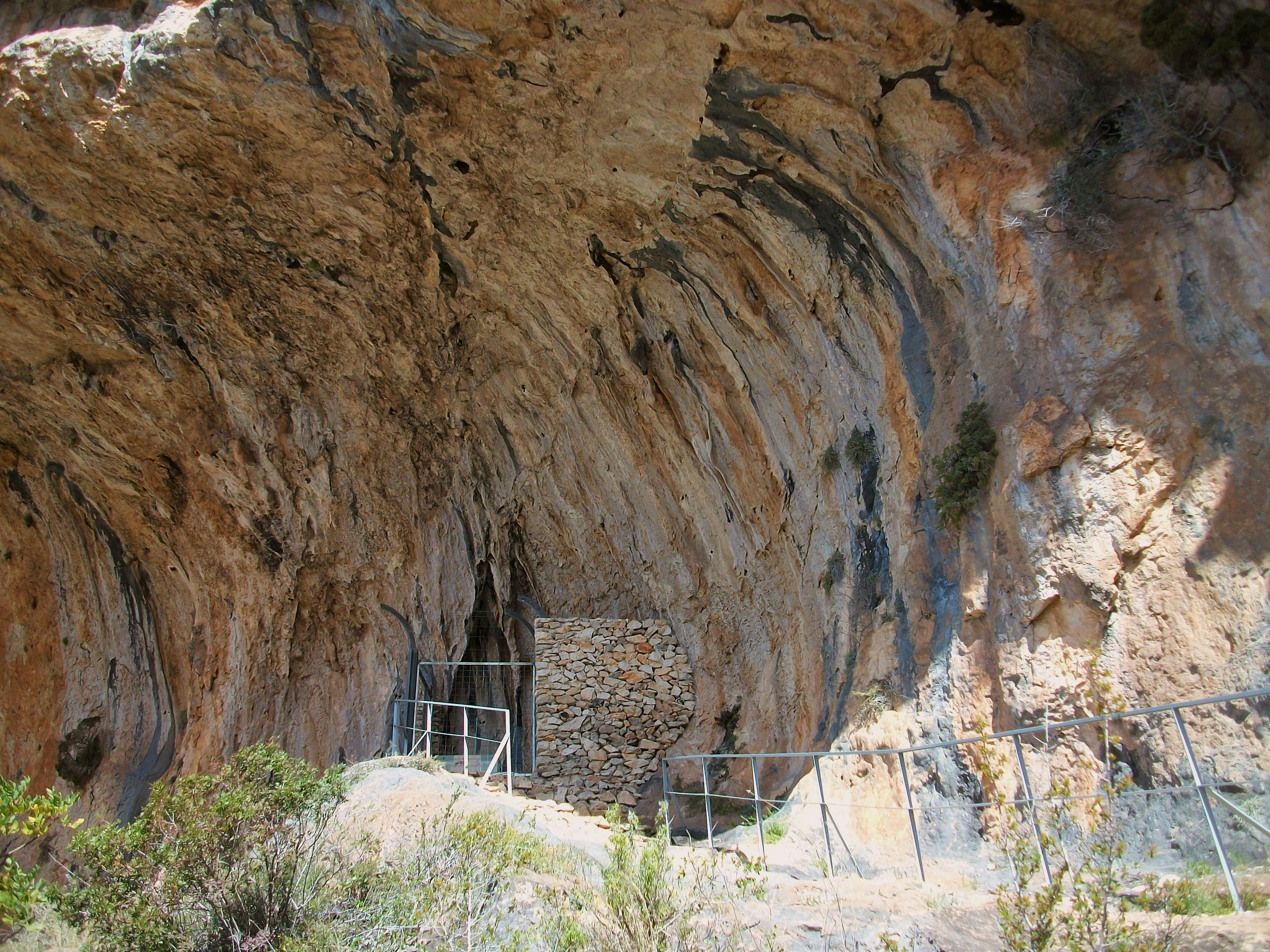
A typical site

The World Heritage Site includes rock art across an area which stretches from the Pyrenees to the province of Granada, falling within the territory of the autonomous communities of Catalonia, Aragon, Castile-La Mancha, Murcia, Valencia and Andalusia. It was declared a Bien de Interés Cultural in 1985.

The art is commonly found in rock shelters (protected by a natural ledge) and shallow caves in which sunlight can penetrate easily. There is no clear preference as to what part of the rock shelter is used for art, it can be placed high or half-way up the walls. The sites were not used for habitation, and lack the organic remains of hearths and rubbish deposits which would help dating. Many sites are heavily decorated with figures superimposed, while other apparently suitable locations nearby have no images at all. The sites are often in ravines in steep valleys that would be relatively little use to farmers, but perhaps ideal for hunting by ambush and stampeding animals into a dead end.

In general the state of conservation is poor. However, various inititiatives have been undertaken to protect the sites at a local level. For example, the municipality of Villar del Humo has designated a cultural park.

== List of protected sites ==
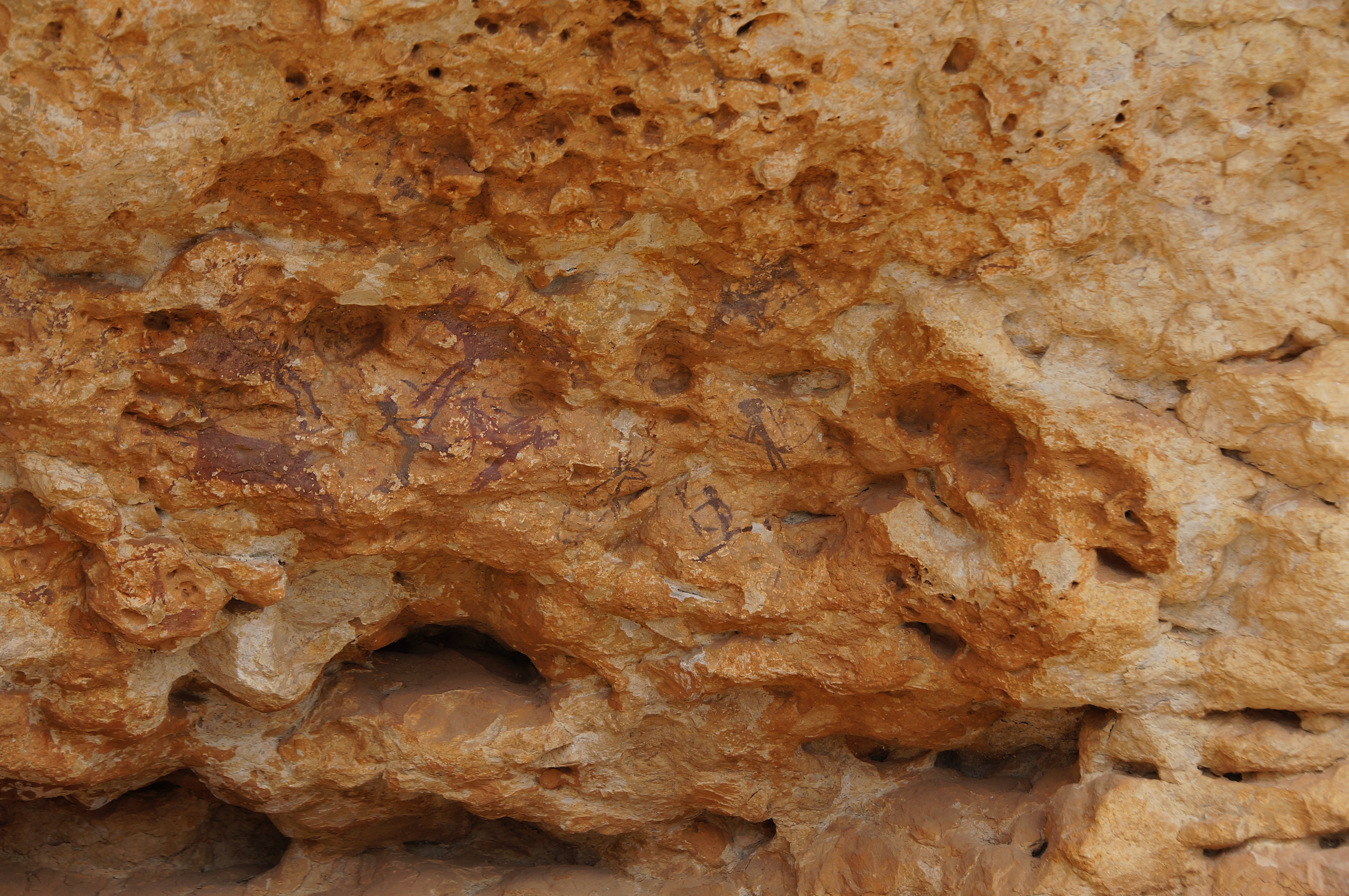
Abrics d'Ermites, Ulldecona

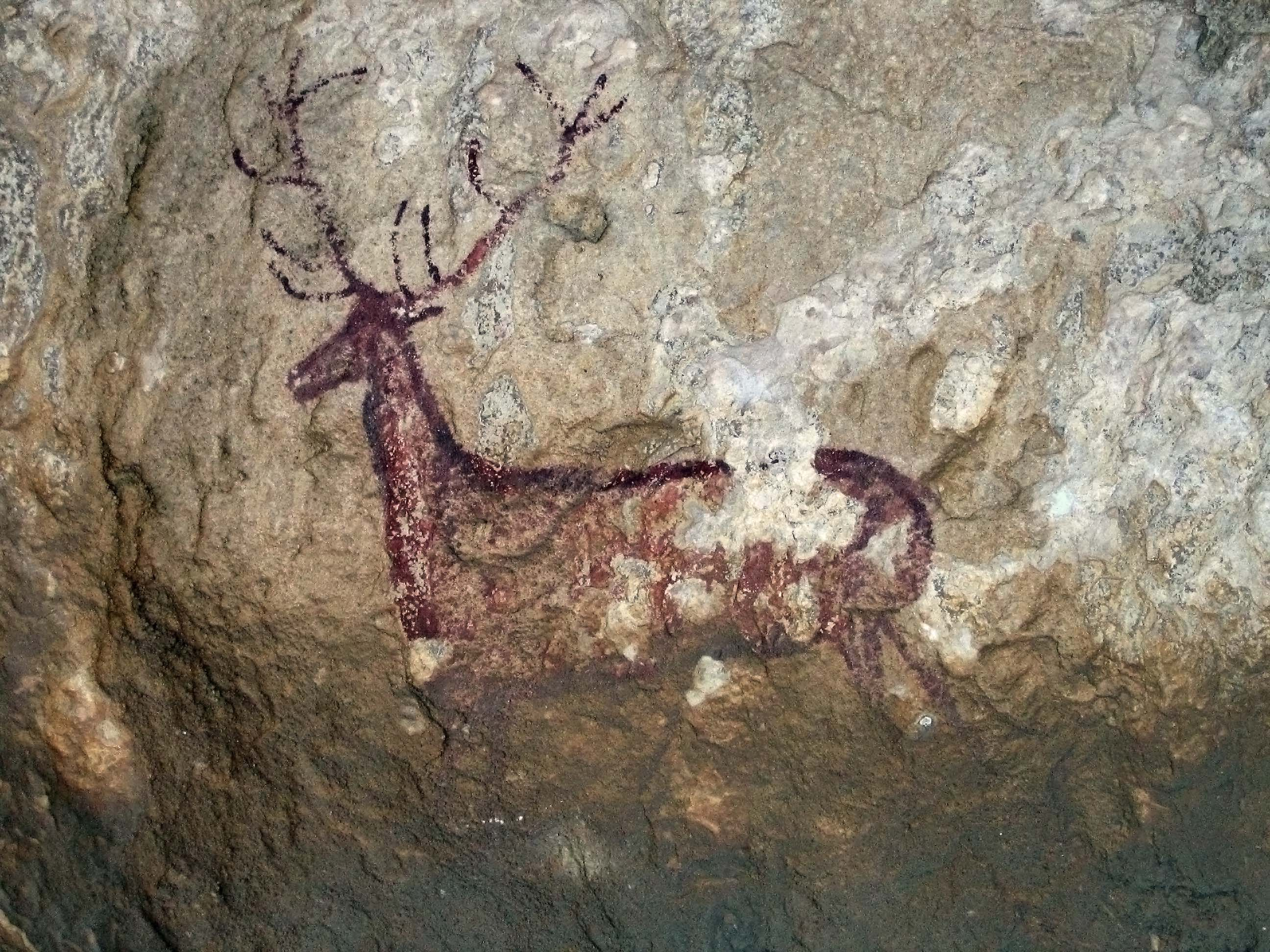
Stag at Chimiachas

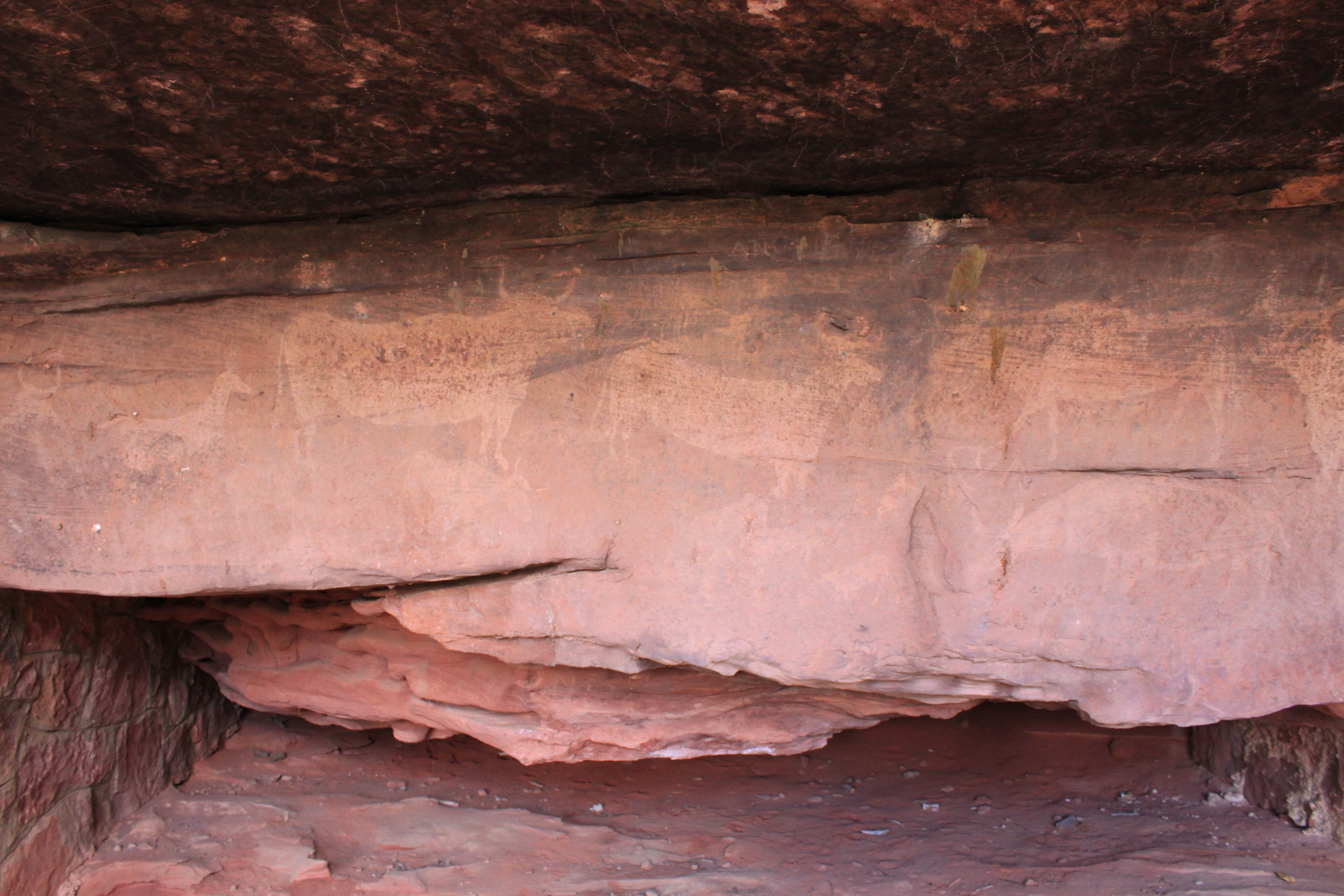
Cattle at Albarracín

This is a collection of 727 rock shelters, caves, or ravine walls (as listed by UNESCO) that contain a figurative representation, or geometrical design. The sites are distributed as follows among the 16 provinces in the 6 regions already mentioned:

- Valencian Community: 301 places.
  - Province of Alicante: 130 places.
  - Province of Castellón: 102 places.
  - Province of Valencia: 69 places.
- Aragon: 132 places.
  - Province of Teruel: 67 places.
  - Province of Huesca: 47 places.
  - Province of Zaragoza: 18 places.
- Castile-La Mancha: 93 places.
  - Province of Albacete: 79 places.
  - Province of Cuenca: 12 places.
  - Province of Guadalajara: 2 places.
- Region of Murcia: 72 places.
- Andalusia: 69 places.
  - Province of Jaén: 42 places.
  - Province of Almería: 25 places.
  - Province of Granada: 2 places

The Parliament of Andalusia approved in 2006 to request the inclusion of rock art of the provinces of Málaga and Cádiz to a Tentative List.

- Catalonia: 60 places.
  - Province of Tarragona: 39 places. In Ulldecona are the largest set of paintings of Catalonia. This small town houses an up-to-date Interpretation Centre for rock art.
  - Province of Lleida: 16 places.
  - Province of Barcelona: 5 places.

== See also ==
- List of Stone Age art
