= Anna, Spain =

Anna
- Municipality
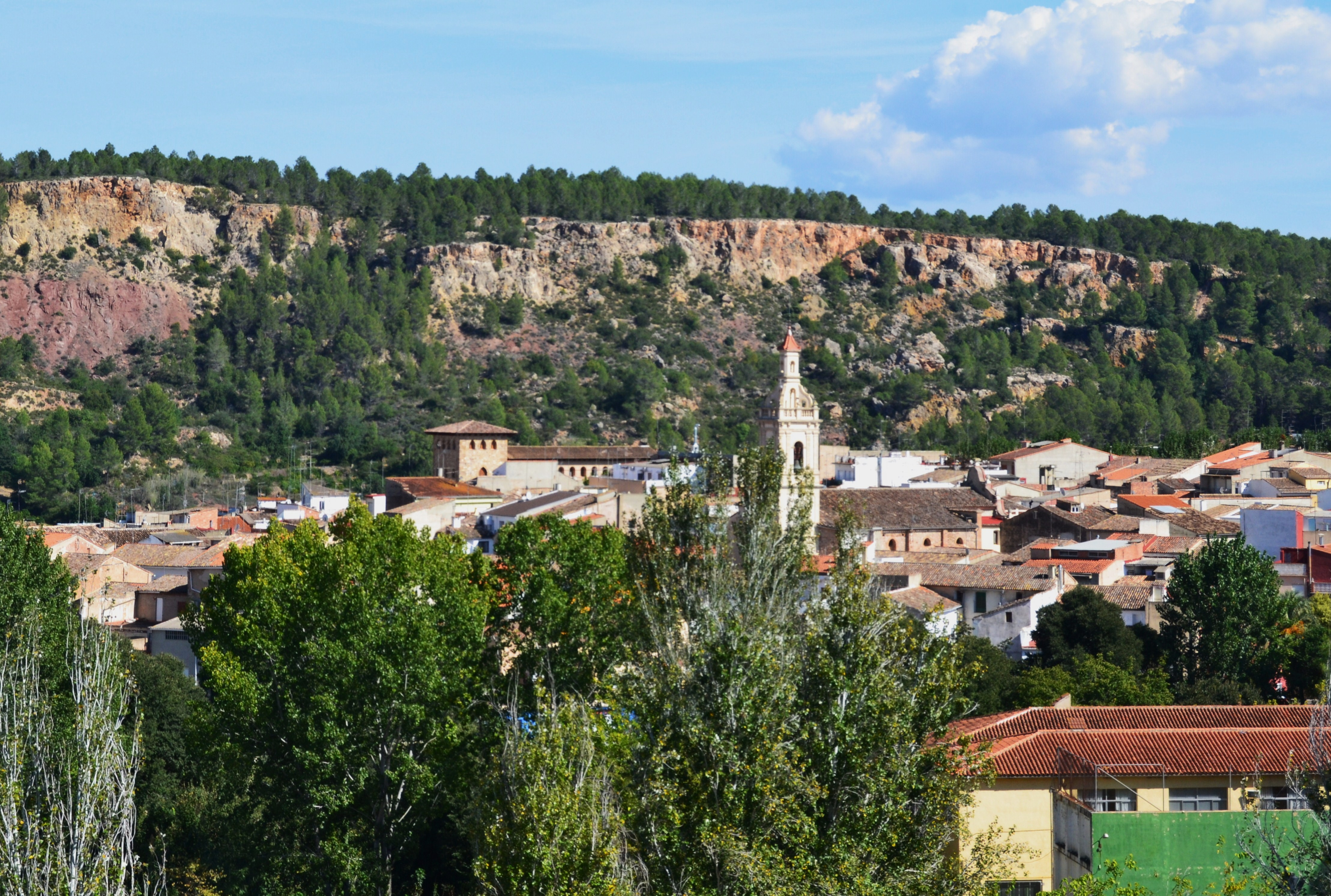

- Coat of arms

- Location in Spain
- Coordinates: 39°01′20″N 0°38′41″W
- Country: Spain
- Autonomous community: Valencian Community
- Province: Valencia
- Comarca: Canal de Navarrés
- Judicial district: Xàtiva

Government
  - Alcaldesa: Miguel Marín Beneyto (2023) (PP)

Area
  - Total: 21.40 km^{2} (8.26 sq mi)
- Elevation: 197 m (646 ft)

Population (2025-01-01)
  - Total: 2,600
  - Density: 120/km^{2} (310/sq mi)
- Demonym: Annero/a
- Time zone: UTC+1 (CET)
  - Summer (DST): UTC+2 (CEST)
- Postal code: 46820
- Official language(s): Valencian, Spanish
- Website: Official website

Anna (Spanish: [ˈanːa], Valencian: [ˈanːa]) is a municipality in Spain, located within Canal de Navarrés which is an administrative subdivision (called a comarca) in the province of Valencia. That province is in the middle of the autonomous Valencian Community.

Among this town's attractions is the Palacio de los Condes de Cervellón, which houses two museums: the Museo Etnológico de la Villa and the Museo del Agua.

== See also ==
- List of municipalities in Valencia
