= Quesa, Valencia =

Quesa
- Municipality
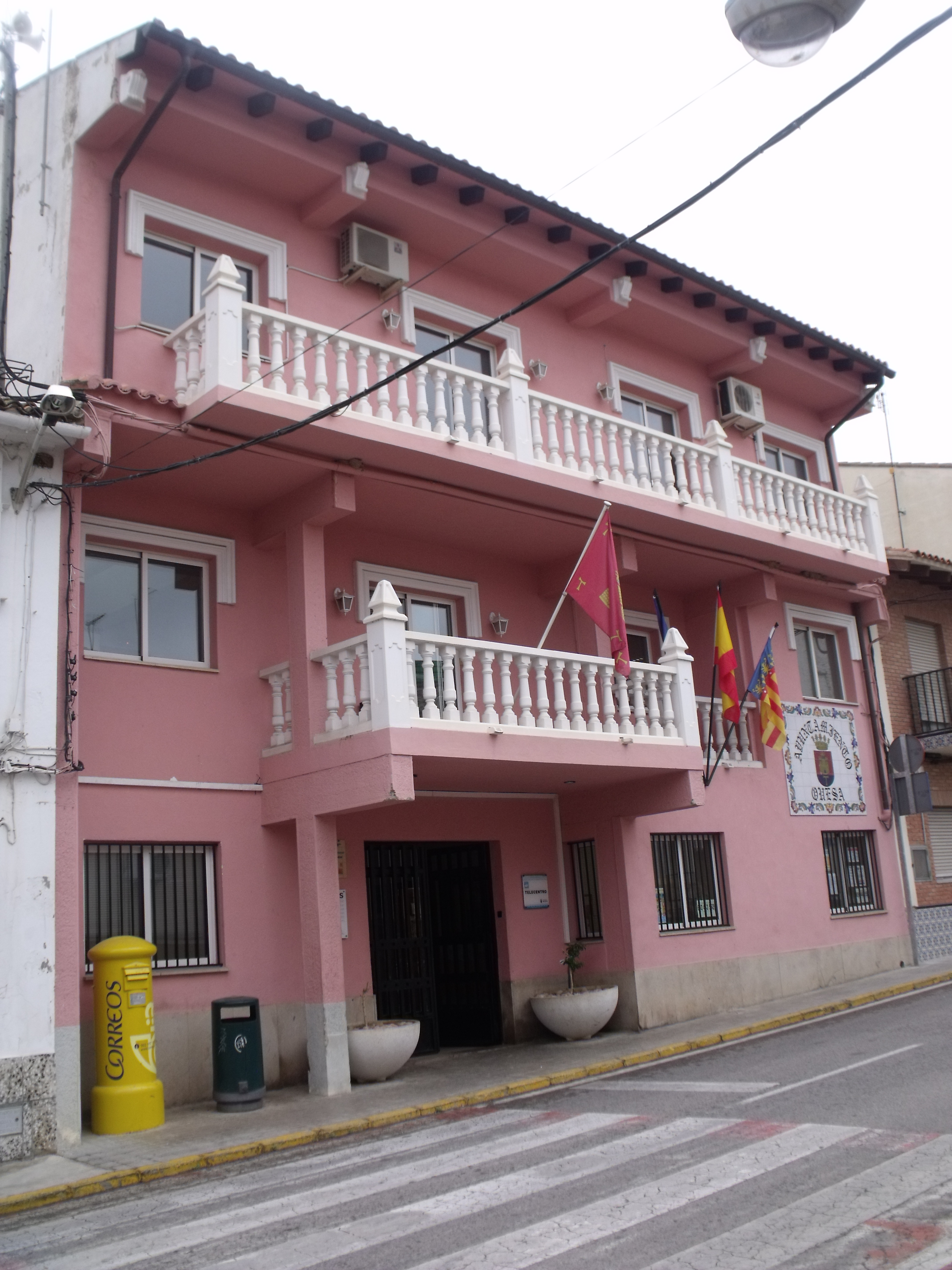

- Flag Coat of arms

- Location in Spain
- Coordinates: 39°7′10″N 0°44′26″W
- Country: Spain
- Autonomous community: Valencian Community
- Province: Valencia
- Comarca: Canal de Navarrés
- Judicial district: Xàtiva

Government
  - Alcalde: Jesús Requena Mut (GDL)

Area
  - Total: 73.2 km^{2} (28.3 sq mi)
- Elevation: 200 m (660 ft)

Population (2025-01-01)
  - Total: 691
  - Density: 9.44/km^{2} (24.4/sq mi)
- Demonym: Quesino/a
- Time zone: UTC+1 (CET)
  - Summer (DST): UTC+2 (CEST)
- Postal code: 46824
- Official language(s): Spanish
- Website: Official website

Quesa is a municipality in the comarca of Canal de Navarrés in the Valencian Community, Spain.

== See also ==
- List of municipalities in Valencia
