= Iberian schematic art =

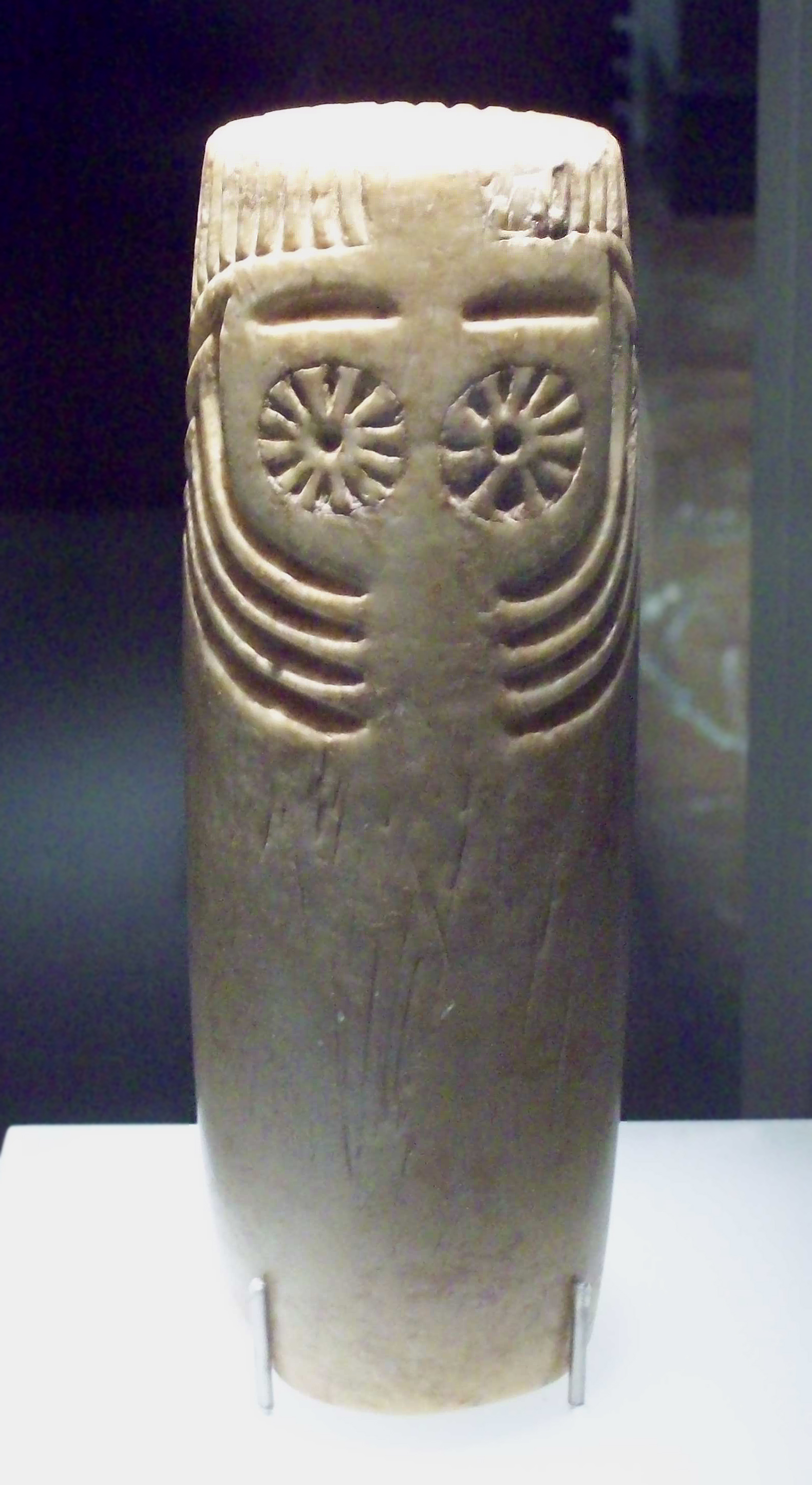
Eyed idol called "of Extremadura" (Copper Age, M.A.N., Madrid).

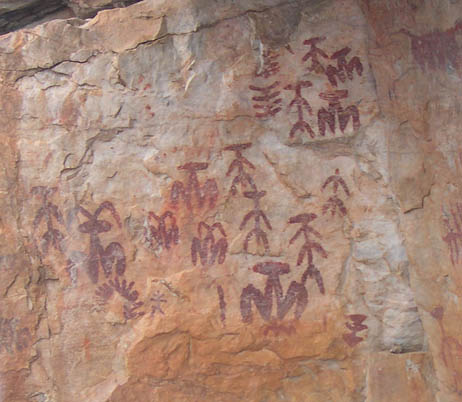
Rock art in Peña Escrita (Ciudad Real)

Iberian schematic art is the name given to a series of prehistoric representations (almost always cave paintings) that appear in the Iberian Peninsula, which are associated with the first metallurgical cultures (the Copper Age, the Bronze Age and even the start of the Iron Age). Its chronology is still a matter for debate, but it could span from the fourth up to the first millennium BC, overlapping, at its start, with Levantine Art and surviving marginally in some isolated regions during much later stages.

Its main characteristic, and that which gives it its name, is the schematic, that is, a figurative style in which only the basic fragments of each figure are represented (eliminating all the rest); what's more, the representation is so basic that the graphic elements are converted into mere outlines, but without losing the minimal identifying features. In fact, the schematic phenomenon is considered somewhat more precise and problematic, and it is integrated in a wide movement which affects almost all of Europe and the Mediterranean.

It could be said that the schematic phenomenon has global dimensions, although each region, including the Hispanic, has its own, differentiating aspects.

== The schematic phenomenon in the Iberian peninsula ==
Schematics in art is a concept linked to realism (a figurative representation more or less faithful to nature, with concrete details which allow the easy identification of the figures), stylization (also figurative, but which accentuates certain details considered arbitrarily important, repeating and distorting them until they lose their real shapes), and abstraction (representations completely unconnected with reality which are associated with a philosophical symbolism and which, although they may unconsciously contain some real elements, such a link is not possible to prove).

Even if one only takes the peninsular ambit into account, schematic art lacks uniformity, it spans quite a wide chronology and its geography is too wide, which makes its study difficult and makes it almost impossible to establish cultural phases or regions.

== See also ==
- Rock Art of the Mediterranean Basin on the Iberian Peninsula
