= Canal de Navarrés =

Coordinates: 38°58′48″N 0°41′17″W

- Comarca
- Country: Spain
- Autonomous community: Valencian Community
- Province: València / Valencia
- Capital and largest city: Enguera
- Municipalities: 8 municipalities: Anna, Bicorp, Bolbaite, Chella, Enguera, Millares, Navarrés, Quesa

Area
  - Total: 709.29 km^{2} (273.86 sq mi)

Population (2006)
  - Total: 17,201
  - Density: 24.251/km^{2} (62.810/sq mi)
- Time zone: UTC+1 (CET)
  - Summer (DST): UTC+2 (CEST)

Canal de Navarrés (Spanish: [kaˈnal de naβaˈres]; Valencian: [kaˈnal de navaˈres]) is a comarca in the province of Valencia, Valencian Community, Spain.

== Municipalities ==
Municipalities of Canal de Navarrés

Municipality	Population	Area	Density
Anna	2,600	21.40	120
Bicorp	546	136.5	4.00
Bolbaite	1,320	40.4	32.7
Chella	2,452	43.5	56.4
Enguera	4,807	241.8	19.88
Millares	321	105.5	3.04
Navarrés	3,027	47	64
Quesa	691	73.2	9.44
