= Millares =

- Municipality
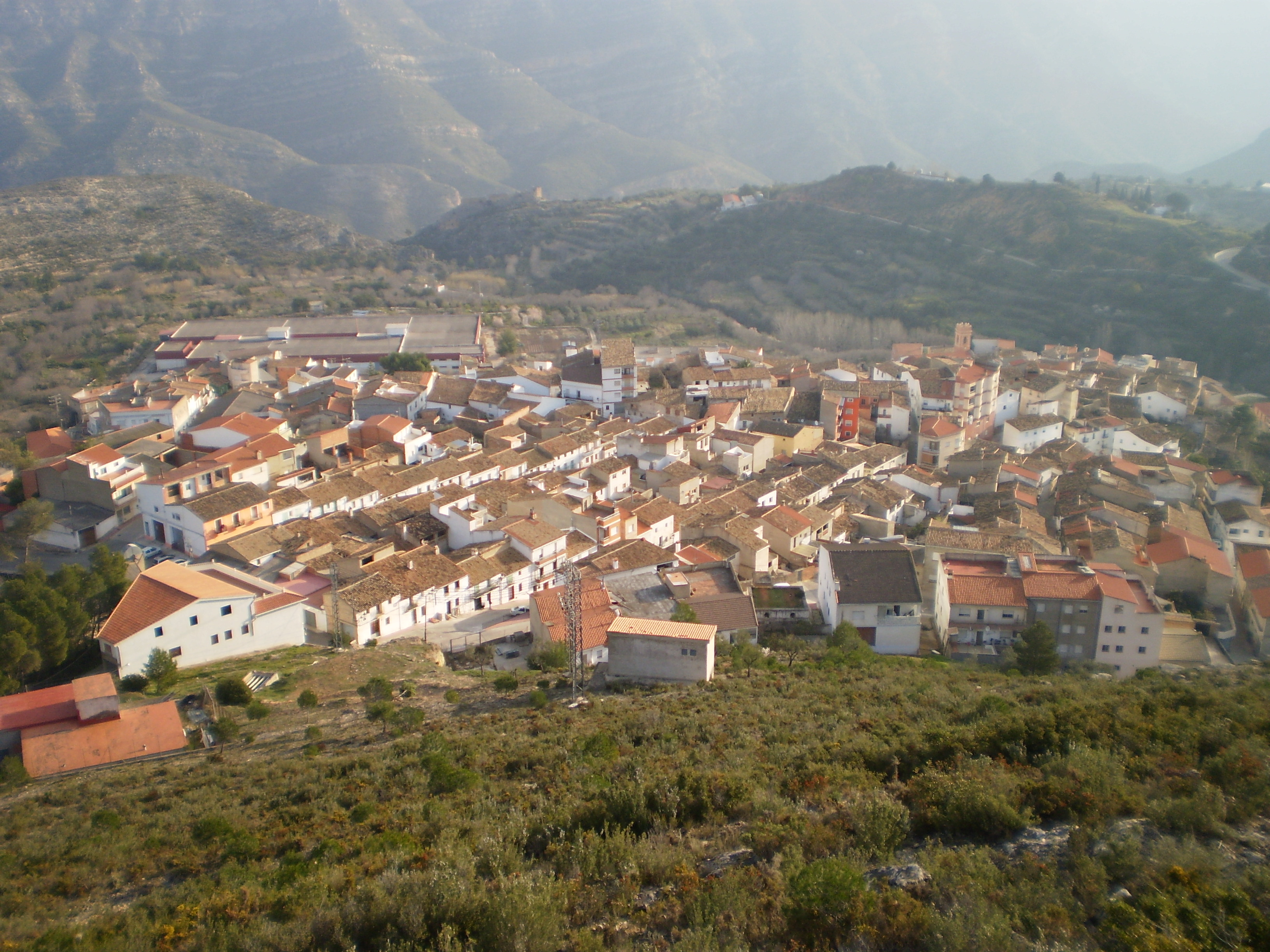

- Coat of arms

- Location in Spain
- Coordinates: 39°14′15″N 0°46′21″W
- Country: Spain
- Autonomous community: Valencian Community
- Province: Valencia
- Comarca: Canal de Navarrés
- Judicial district: Requena

Government
  - Alcalde: Higinio Pérez Pla (2007) (PP)

Area
  - Total: 105.5 km^{2} (40.7 sq mi)
- Elevation: 344 m (1,129 ft)

Population (2025-01-01)
  - Total: 321
  - Density: 3.04/km^{2} (7.88/sq mi)
- Demonym: Millarense
- Time zone: UTC+1 (CET)
  - Summer (DST): UTC+2 (CEST)
- Postal code: 46198
- Official language(s): Spanish
- Website: Official website

Millares is a municipality in the comarca of Canal de Navarrés in the Valencian Community, Spain.

== See also ==
- List of municipalities in Valencia
