= Navarrés =

- Municipality
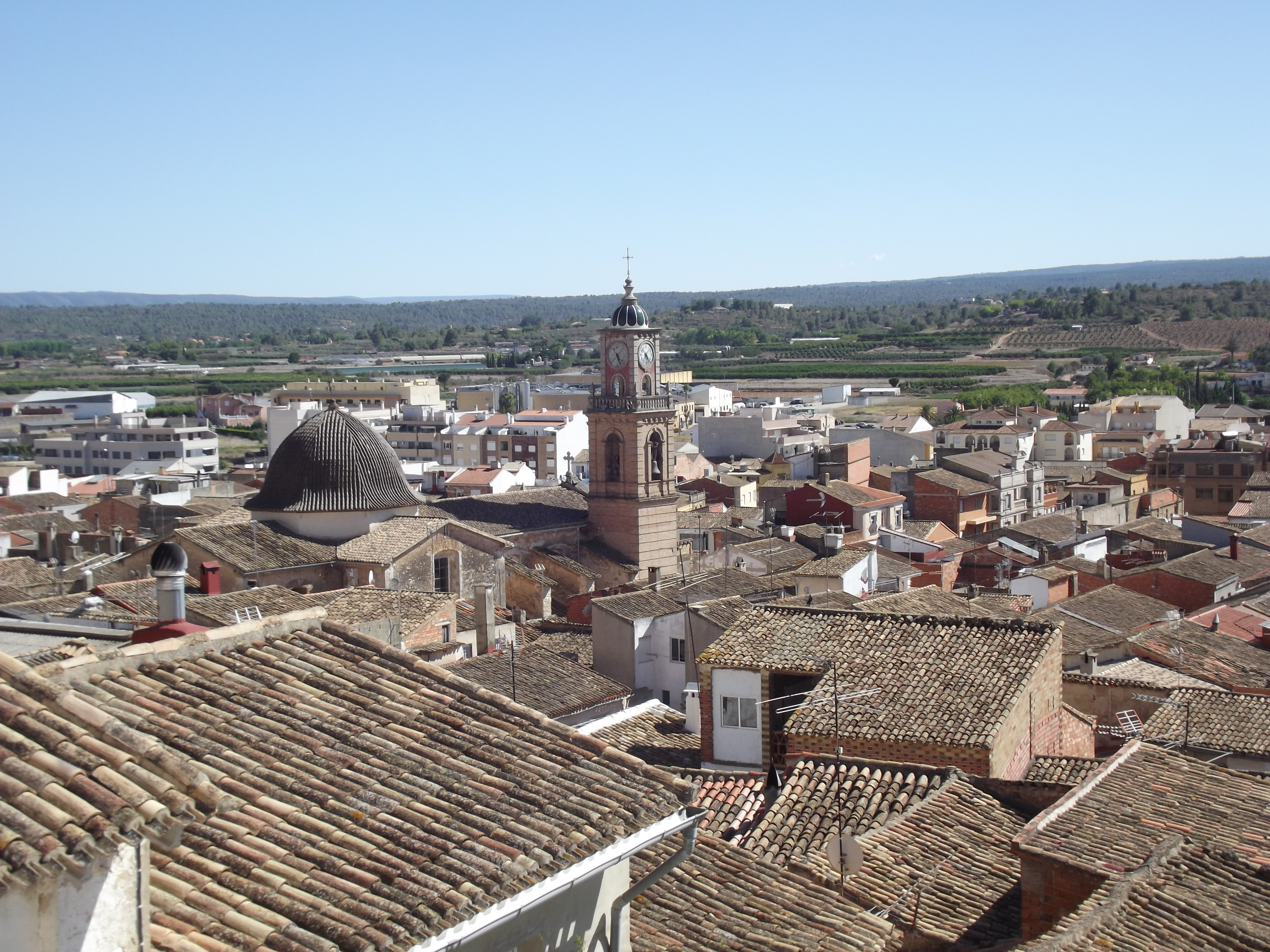
- Navarrés

- Coat of arms

- Location in Spain
- Coordinates: 39°6′5″N 0°41′36″W
- Country: Spain
- Autonomous community: Valencian Community
- Province: Valencia
- Comarca: Canal de Navarrés
- Judicial district: Xàtiva

Government
  - Alcalde: Vicente Huesca Argente (2007) (PSOE)

Area
  - Total: 47 km^{2} (18 sq mi)
- Elevation: 275 m (902 ft)

Population (2025-01-01)
  - Total: 3,027
  - Density: 64/km^{2} (170/sq mi)
- Demonym: Navarresino/-a
- Time zone: UTC+1 (CET)
  - Summer (DST): UTC+2 (CEST)
- Postal code: 46823
- Official language(s): Spanish
- Website: Official website

Navarrés is a municipality in the comarca of Canal de Navarrés in the Valencian Community, Spain.

== See also ==
- List of municipalities in Valencia
