= Bicorp =

- Municipality
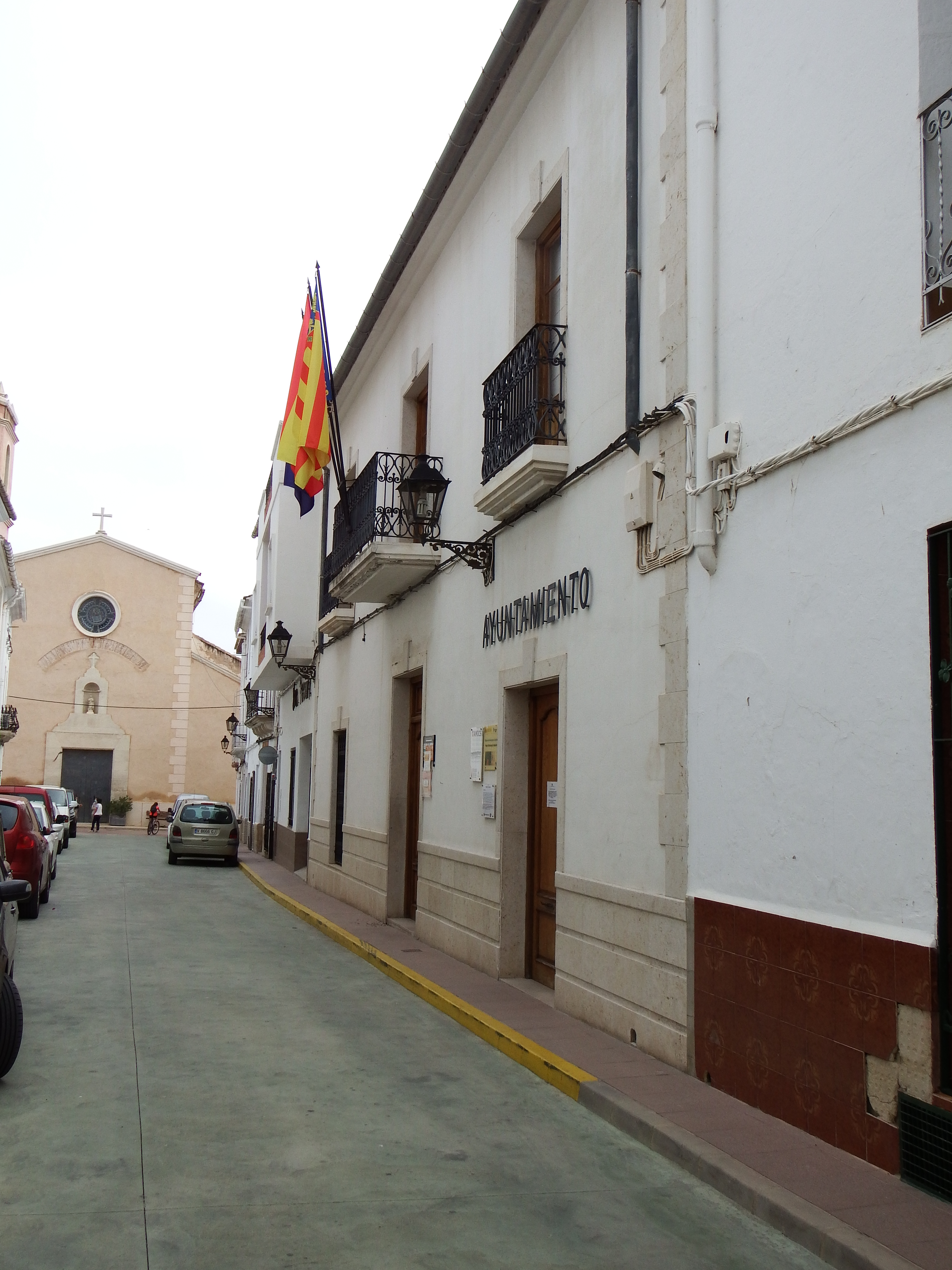
- Town hall

- Coat of arms

- Location in Spain
- Coordinates: 39°07′55″N 0°47′16″W
- Country: Spain
- Autonomous community: Valencian Community
- Province: Valencia
- Comarca: Canal de Navarrés
- Judicial district: Xàtiva

Government
  - Alcalde: Pascual Gandía Sotos (2007) (AIB)

Area
  - Total: 136.5 km^{2} (52.7 sq mi)
- Elevation: 292 m (958 ft)

Population (2025-01-01)
  - Total: 546
  - Density: 4.00/km^{2} (10.4/sq mi)
- Demonym: Bicorino/a
- Time zone: UTC+1 (CET)
  - Summer (DST): UTC+2 (CEST)
- Postal code: 46825
- Official language(s): Spanish
- Website: Official website

Bicorp is a municipality in the comarca of Canal de Navarrés in the Valencian Community, Spain.

== See also ==
- Cuevas de la Araña en Bicorp
