= Enguera =

- Municipality
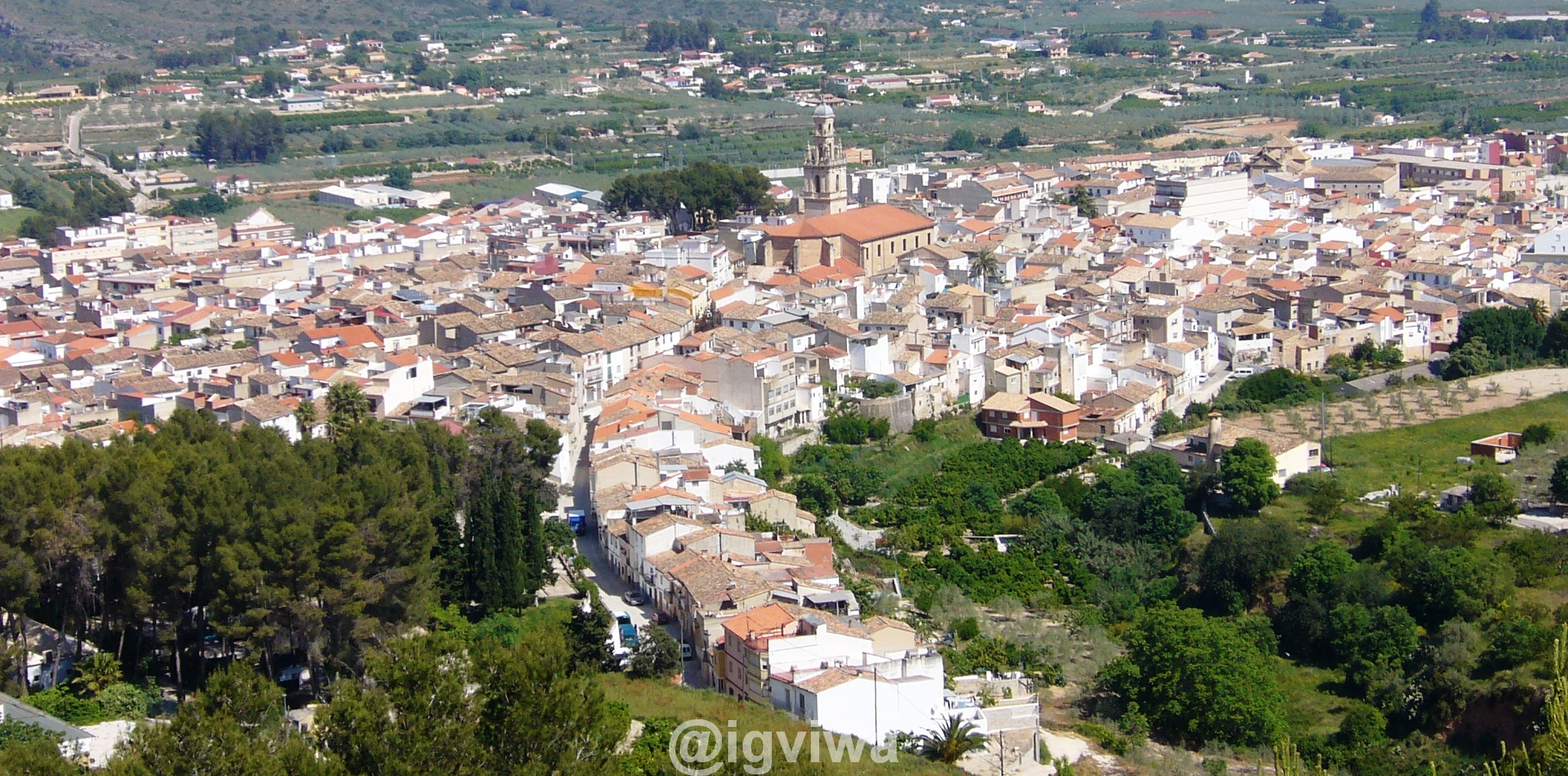

- Flag Coat of arms

- Location in Spain
- Coordinates: 38°58′55″N 0°41′16″W
- Country: Spain
- Autonomous community: Valencian Community
- Province: Valencia
- Comarca: Canal de Navarrés
- Judicial district: Xàtiva

Government
  - Mayor: Oscar Maravilla (2016) (PSOE)

Area
  - Total: 241.8 km^{2} (93.4 sq mi)
- Elevation: 318 m (1,043 ft)

Population (2025-01-01)
  - Total: 4,807
  - Density: 19.88/km^{2} (51.49/sq mi)
- Demonym: Enguerinos
- Time zone: UTC+1 (CET)
  - Summer (DST): UTC+2 (CEST)
- Postal code: 46810
- Official language(s): Spanish
- Website: Official website

Enguera is a municipality in southwestern province of Valencia, Spain.

The local economy depends primarily on agriculture, and secondarily on industry and services. In recent years, agricultural crops, especially olives, have gained in importance, although the complementary or secondary component of agriculture is evident. Rural tourism, including camping, country homes, a hotel, and restaurants are gaining importance. Meanwhile, the once-flourishing industry that was an important part of the village economy at the end of the eighteenth century has faded almost to nothing. While many of Enguera's inhabitants work in industry, their jobs are in nearby towns.

The Sierra de Enguera is named after this town.

== Main sights ==
- Late Renaissance church of St. Michael Archangel (16th-17th centuries). It houses a Gothic processional cross.
- Convent of Sts. Joseph and Anne (17th century)
- Hermitage of St. Anthony of Padua
- Archaeological Museum
- Museum of Fine Arts
- Ethnological Museum
- Museum of Agriculture
- Ruins of the Muslim Castle, destroyed in 1365
- The village of Navalón

== Notable people ==
- Jorge Perona (born 1 April 1982), Spanish footballer
- Manuel Tolsá was a prolific Neoclassical architect and sculptor in Spain and Mexico. He served as the first director of the Academy of San Carlos.
- José María Albiñana (October 13, 1883 – 1936) was a Spanish physician, neurologist, medical writer, philosopher and anti-republican far-right politician.

== See also ==
- List of municipalities in Valencia
