= Bolbaite =

- Municipality
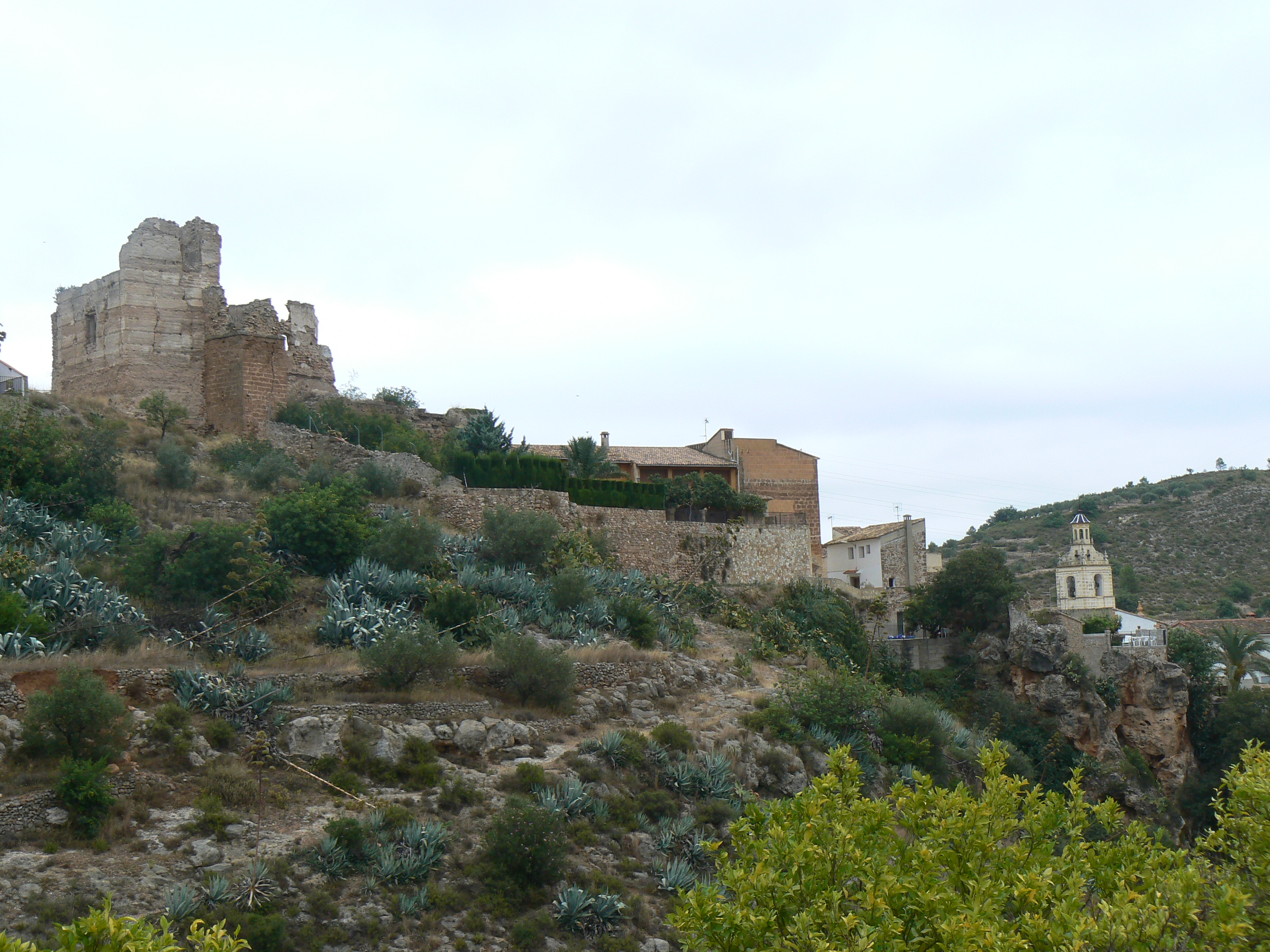

- Coat of arms

- Location in Spain
- Coordinates: 39°3′50″N 0°40′26″W
- Country: Spain
- Autonomous community: Valencian Community
- Province: Valencia
- Comarca: Canal de Navarrés
- Judicial district: Xàtiva

Government
  - Alcaldesa: Práxedes Polop Argente (2007) (PP)

Area
  - Total: 40.4 km^{2} (15.6 sq mi)
- Elevation: 253 m (830 ft)

Population (2025-01-01)
  - Total: 1,320
  - Density: 32.7/km^{2} (84.6/sq mi)
- Demonym: Bolbaitino/a
- Time zone: UTC+1 (CET)
  - Summer (DST): UTC+2 (CEST)
- Postal code: 46822
- Official language(s): Spanish
- Website: Official website

Bolbaite is a municipality in the comarca of Canal de Navarrés in the Valencian Community, Spain.

== Demography ==
Demographic evolution.
1990	1992	1994	1996	1998	2000	2002	2004	2005	2006	2007	2008	2009	2010	2011	2012
1.420	1.402	1.421	1.439	1.432	1.411	1.436	1.458	1.452	1.385	1.507	1.487	1.439	1.469	1.491	1.489

== Monuments ==
- Castillo de Bolbaite S. XVI
- Iglesia parroquial de San Francisco de Paula 1521.

== See also ==
- List of municipalities in Valencia
