= Oran fatwa =

1504 Islamic legal opinion

- A 1915 Spanish translation of the fatwa
- Created: 1 Rajab 910 AH (c. 8 December 1504 CE)
- Location: Extant copies (including translations) kept in: Vatican City; Madrid, Spain Aix-en-Provence, France
- Author: Ahmad ibn Abi Jum'ah
- Subject: Relaxations of sharia requirements for Spanish Muslims who were forced to become Christians, when necessary to survive

The Oran fatwa was a responsum fatwa, or an Islamic legal opinion, issued in 1502 to address the crisis that occurred when Muslims in the Crown of Castile, in present-day Spain, were forced to convert to Christianity in 1500–1502. It was authored by a maliki mufti Ahmad ibn Abi Jum'ah, an Algerian scholar of Islamic law of the Maliki school; the term "Oran fatwa" was applied by modern scholars, due to the word "Al-Wahrani" ("of Oran") that appears in the text as part of the author's name.

The fatwa sets out detailed relaxations of sharia (Islamic law) requirements, allowing Muslims to conform outwardly to Christianity and perform acts that are ordinarily forbidden in Islamic law, when necessary to survive. It includes pliable instructions for fulfilling the ritual prayers, the ritual charity, and the ritual ablution, and recommendations when obliged to violate Islamic law, such as worshipping as Christians, committing blasphemy, and consuming pork and wine.

The fatwa enjoyed wide currency among Spanish Muslims and Moriscos—Muslims nominally converted to Christianity and their descendants; one of its surviving aljamiado translations was dated at 1564, six decades after it was first issued. The fatwa has been described as the "key theological document" to understand the practice of Spanish Muslims following the Reconquista up to the expulsion of the Moriscos in the early 17th century.

The influence of the Oran fatwa was limited to Spain: Outside the Iberian Peninsula, the predominant opinion upheld the requirements of Islamic law and required Muslims to emigrate, or even choose martyrdom, when the orthodox observance of the religion became impossible.

== Background ==
Islam existed in Spain since the Muslim conquest of the Iberian Peninsula in the eighth century. At the beginning of the twelfth century, the Muslim population in the Iberian Peninsula, called al-Andalus in Arabic, was estimated to number up to 5.5 million, among whom were Arabs, Berbers and indigenous converts. In the next few centuries, as the Christians pushed from the north in a process called the Reconquista, the Muslim population declined. At the end of the fifteenth century, the Reconquista culminated in the fall of Granada, and the total number of Muslims in Spain was estimated to be between 500,000 and 600,000 out of the total Spanish population of 7 to 8 million. Approximately half of the Muslims lived in the former Emirate of Granada, the last independent Muslim state in Spain, which had been annexed to the Crown of Castile. About 20,000 Muslims lived in other territories of Castile, and most of the remainder lived in the territories of the Crown of Aragon.

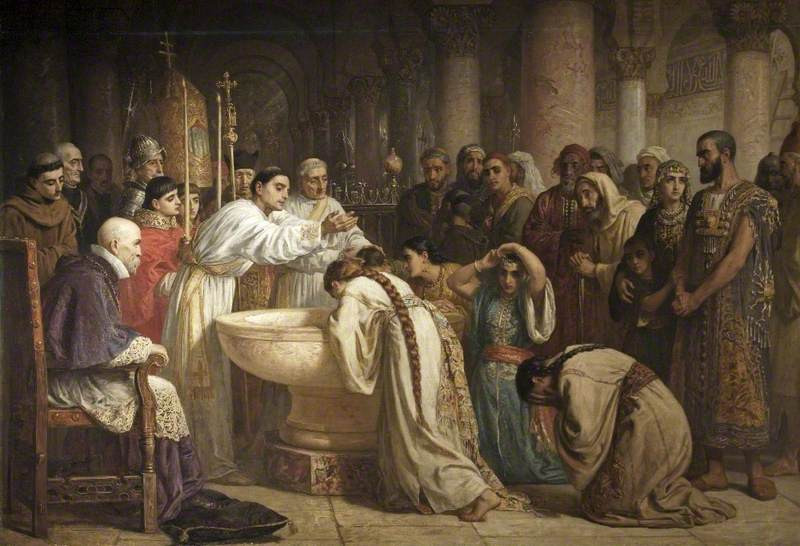
Forced conversions to Christianity was the background of the fatwa. This 1873 painting depicts the mass baptism of Muslims in Granada by Cardinal Francisco Jiménez de Cisneros in 1500.

Prior to the completion of the Reconquista, the defeated Muslims were generally given freedom of religion as terms of their surrender. For example, the Treaty of Granada, which governed the surrender of the emirate, guaranteed a set of rights to the conquered Muslims, including religious tolerance and fair treatment, in return for their capitulation. The increasing occurrences of forced conversion triggered a series of Muslim rebellions in Granada (1499–1501). The rebellions were suppressed, and afterwards the Muslims in Granada were no longer given the rights that had been provided to them by the Treaty of Granada. They were given the choice to remain and accept baptism, to reject baptism and be enslaved or killed, or to be exiled. The option of exile was often not feasible in practice because of the difficulty in uprooting one's family and making the journey to Muslim lands in North Africa, the inability to pay the fee required by the authorities for safe passage, and the general tendency by the authorities to discourage and hinder such an exodus.

Some Muslims, especially those living near the southern coast, took the option of exile, but for most, publicly converting to Christianity while secretly continuing to believe and practise Islam was the only available option for surviving as Muslims. The population converted en masse, and by 1501 the entire Muslim population of Granada was nominally converted to Christianity. The apparent success of Granada's forced conversions triggered a series of edicts and proclamations in 1501 and 1502, which effectively put the Muslims elsewhere in Castile to the same fate. These new converts, along with their descendants, were known by Spanish sources as the Moriscos. As well as having to accept Christianity and abandon the Islamic faith and rituals, they were also pressured to conform to Christian ways, including by attending church, sending their children to be instructed in the Christian doctrine, and partaking of food and beverages forbidden by Islamic law.

=== Previous Islamic legal opinions ===
Prior to the Oran fatwa, the predominant position of Islamic scholars had been that a Muslim could not stay in a country where rulers made proper religious observance impossible. Therefore, a Muslim's obligation was to leave, when they were able to do so. Even before the systematic forcible conversion, religious leaders had argued that Muslims in Christian territory would be subject to direct and indirect pressure, and preached emigration as a way to protect the religion from erosion. Notably, the contemporary Algerian scholar Ahmad al-Wansharisi, who was considered the leading authority on the subject of Muslims in Spain, wrote in 1491 that emigrating from Christian to Muslim lands was compulsory in almost all circumstances. Further, al-Wansharisi urged severe punishment for the Muslims who remained and predicted that they would temporarily dwell in hell in the afterlife.

== Authorship ==
The surviving translations of the fatwa give the name of the author in various slightly different forms. All of them are thought to be derived from the Arabic name Ahmad ibn Abi Jum'ah al-Maghrawi al-Wahrani, with some adding the name 'Ubaydallah, which might be a pious formula meaning "the little servant of God". The author's nisba — the part of his name that indicates place of origin — al-Wahrani ("of Oran") refers to the city of Oran (Arabic: وهران, Wahran) in modern-day Algeria, then part of the Zayyanid kingdom of Tlemcen. Thus, the author is often referred to as "the Mufti of Oran" and the document is called "the Oran fatwa", even though there appeared to be no indication that the fatwa was issued in Oran or that the author resided or had an official authority in Oran. Devin Stewart, an academic specialist in Islamic studies, identified the author as Abu al-Abbas Ahmad ibn Abi Jum'ah al-Maghrawi al-Wahrani (b. unknown – d. 1511 in Fez), a Maliki jurist who had studied in Oran and Tlemcen and probably issued the fatwa in Fez while a professor of Islamic law there.

Al-Wahrani drafted the fatwa in response to a request of legal opinion, in other words, as a responsum, to Muslim petitioners who wished to learn if they could continue to live in Christian Spain. The recipient of the fatwa is not named. The commonly accepted date of the composition of the fatwa is 1 Rajab 910 AH, as this was the date that appears in most of the surviving manuscripts. This day in the Islamic calendar corresponds to around 8 December 1504. One manuscript added "3 May 1563" in addition to 1 Rajab 910, which would have been a date conversion error, but both Stewart and the historian L. P. Harvey have suggested that the 1563 date might have been the time of the translation. One other manuscript gives "Rajab 909", which was probably a copying error.

== Content ==
The opening of the fatwa displayed sympathy to the Muslims of Spain, who kept their religious faith despite the suffering and risk that this posed them. The mufti (author of the fatwa) exhorted that they continue to adhere to the religion of Islam and instruct it to their children when the latter reached maturity.

The fatwa reaffirmed the obligation of Spanish Muslims to perform salah (ritual prayer), zakat (almsgiving), and ghusl (major ritual ablution), even if they could not be performed in the correct form. It described the obligation of the ritual prayers – normally performed by standing, bowing, prostrating, and sitting in a prescribed sequence – even if done only by making slight movements. The fatwa also allowed the omission of the prayers – normally performed an obligatory five times a day at prescribed times – when they were prevented from doing so, and instructed them to make up the missed prayers at night instead. It also provided instructions for performing tayammum (waterless ritual purification) when ritually pure water was not available to replace the wudu (minor ritual ablution) that is ordinarily required before performing salah. When tayammum was impossible, even making slight pointing motions with hands or face toward clean earth, stone, or tree was acceptable.

The fatwa also maintained the Islamic obligation to give the ritual charity (zakat) – normally calculated and distributed in a specific manner prescribed by the sharia (Islamic law) – even if this could only be done by showing generosity to a beggar. It affirmed the obligation of the ritual ablution (ghusl), "even though by plunging into the sea".

The fatwa permitted Muslims outwardly to participate in Christian rituals and worship, so long as they inwardly considered them to be forbidden. When the Muslims had to prostrate to Christian idols, they were to internally desire to perform the Islamic prayer, even if not actually facing Mecca. When they bowed down to the idols, they were to focus their attention toward God. When obliged to commit blasphemy, such as cursing Muhammad, or accepting Jesus as the son of God or Mary as God's wife [sic], the fatwa instructed them to do so, and to employ "whatever stratagems" they could to negate their meaning whenever possible. For example, the fatwa suggested mispronouncing the name of Muhammad or intending to curse someone else with a similar name when being required to curse the prophet.

The fatwa also allowed Spain's Muslims to consume wine, pork, and other things normally forbidden by the sharia, as long as the Muslims did not intend to take advantage of them and rejected them in their hearts. The fatwa reaffirmed the permissibility of a Muslim man marrying a Christian woman, under the reasoning that both Muslims and Christians were People of the Book. Marriage between a Muslim woman and a Christian man was to be avoided unless under duress, and while doing so the Muslims should "cleave firmly to the belief that that is forbidden".

At the end of the fatwa, the author encouraged the Muslims to write to the mufti about anything else that presented difficulty to them, so that he could give further legal opinions. The fatwa discreetly did not name any specific recipient, and instead designated the persons it was addressed to by al-ghuraba (those living abroad) yet near to God.

== Reactions ==
=== Impact in Spain ===
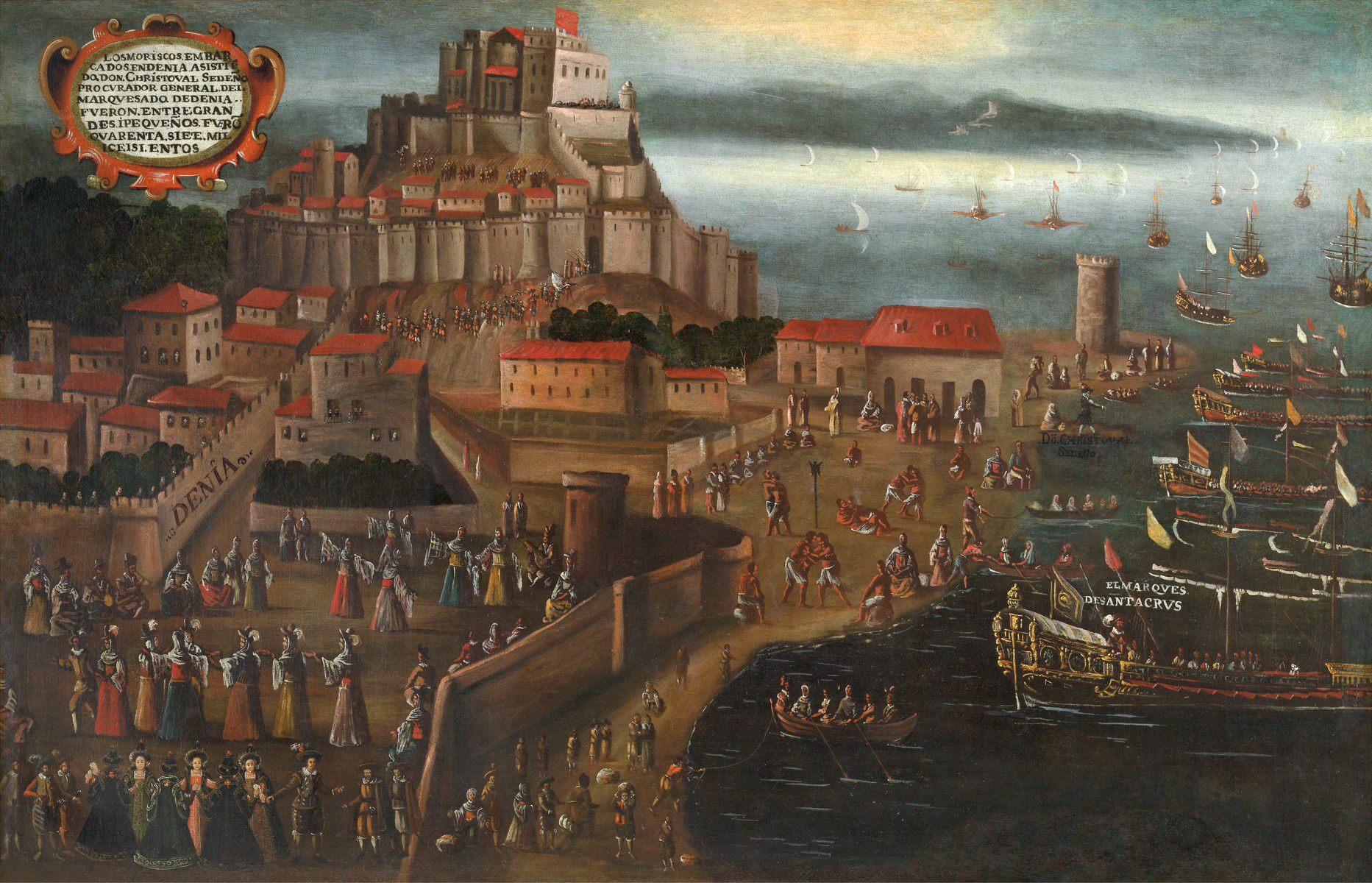
The opinion in the fatwa had a lasting impact in the Morisco community until their expulsion from Spain in 1609–1614, depicted in The Expulsion at the Port of Denia by Vicente Mostre, 1613.

The fatwa appeared to enjoy wide currency within the Muslim and Morisco community in various kingdoms of Spain, for it was translated and copied as late as 1563 and 1609. The full geographical reach of the text is unknown, but it appeared to be originally addressed to the Muslims (or Moriscos) of Castile as a response to their forced conversions in 1500–1502. After the forced conversion was extended to the Crown of Aragon in the 1520s, the fatwa likely circulated there, too.

The opinion formed the basis of the Moriscos' Islamic status and practices for more than a century, until their expulsion in 1609–1614. This led to a non-traditional form of Islam, in which one's internal intention (niyya), rather than external observation of rituals and laws, was the defining characteristic of one's Islam. Generations of Moriscos were born and died within this religious climate. Hybrid or undefined religious practice featured in many Morisco texts. For example, the works of the Morisco writer known as "the Young Man of Arévalo", written c. 1530s described crypto-Muslims using Christian worship as replacement for regular Islamic rituals, as recommended in the fatwa.

The influence of the fatwa was limited to Spain. Outside the Iberian Peninsula, the predominant opinion continued to uphold the unbending requirements of Islamic law and required Muslims to leave any country, or even choose martyrdom, where approved observance of the religion became impossible.

=== Scholarly analysis ===
Modern scholars of Spanish Islamic history stressed the historical importance of the fatwa. Harvey called it "the key theological document" for the study of Spanish Islam following the forced conversions, a description which Stewart repeated. Mercedes García-Arenal and Fernando Rodríguez Mediano, historians of Spain and Western Muslims, described the fatwa as "famous" and called it "one of the most important theological texts of later Spanish Islam". Spanish literature scholar María del Mar Rosa-Rodríguez considered the fatwa important because it officially documented "the existence of religiosities that do not depend on traditional ritual practice".

Harvey and Stewart said that the fatwa was a departure from the previous legal opinions among Islamic scholars, which typically emphasised the obligation to emigrate from any country where proper religious observance was not possible. Notably, the Maliki scholar al-Wansharisi, the leading living authority on the issue, was among the proponents of this view. Stewart contended that, while the fatwa's text did not mention any opponent, it was intended as a rebuke against the views of al-Wansharisi. Recipients of this fatwa would be able to stay put, outwardly conforming to Christianity and not see themselves as abandoning their faith. The fatwa addressed the recipient as "al-guraba", a word that means "outsiders" or "those living abroad", but this word also appears in several hadiths (sayings of Muhammad) and evokes a spiritual meaning of heroic Muslims loyal to their faith in spite of great suffering. The sympathy shown by the author, as well as his acknowledgement of the Muslims' loyalty and suffering, is in contrast with the predominant opinion such as al-Wansharisi's which saw them unfavourably.

Harvey did not consider the fatwa as a permanent and universal relaxation of the sharia; instead, the sender and the recipients of the fatwa must have seen its provisions as temporary expedients under extraordinary circumstances intended to help the Muslims of Spain through the crisis. The fatwa began by affirming in orthodox terms the obligations of all Muslims, and ended by expressing hopes that Islam may again be practised openly without ordeals, tribulations and fear. The mufti and many Moriscos expected or hoped that the crisis to end at some not-too-distant time. Rosa-Rodriguez noted that the fatwa stated a hope that the "Noble Turks" would soon intervene and end the religious persecution in Spain, a reference to the Ottoman Empire's growing power in the Mediterranean at the time. This hope did not materialise, and the religious persecution in Spain continued, causing the fatwa's recommendations to become the normal way of practicing Islam for generations.

Harvey also noted that the fatwa covered a wide range of Islamic religious duties, while usually a responsum fatwa only addresses a specific enquiry on a difficult point of detail. The fatwa also went into specific practical challenges faced by Muslims in Spain, such as the pressure to curse Muhammad, eat pork, drink wine, and intermarry with the Christians. This suggests that the author had some knowledge of what life under Christian rule was like.

=== In popular culture ===
Amin Maalouf's 1986 novel Leo Africanus features a fictionalised version of the fatwa. In the novel, Muslim exiles from Granada and the local ulama (Islamic scholars) held meetings in Fez to provide counsel to the Muslims in Granada, who sent letters describing their persecution and their dilemma. Amid the meetings, the protagonist of the novel witnessed the "man from Oran" delivering a speech similar in content to the Oran fatwa.

== Surviving manuscripts ==
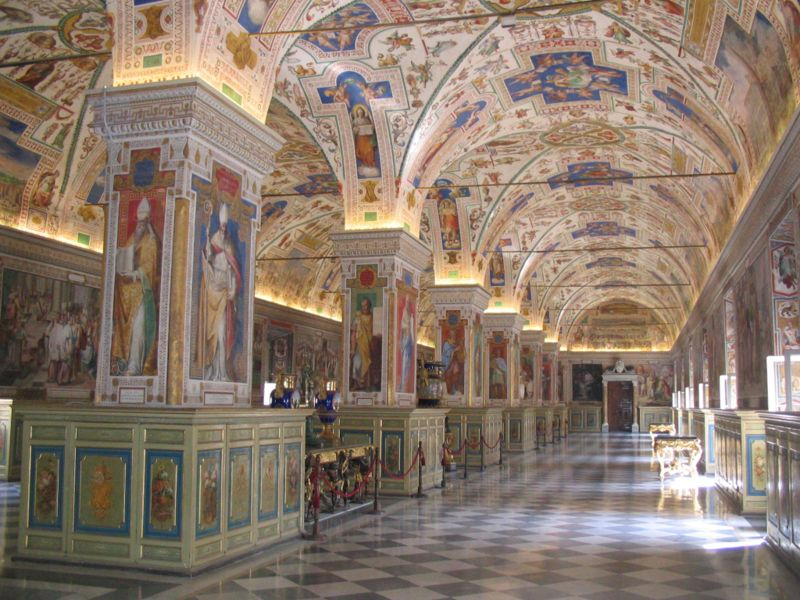
The Vatican Library, which houses the only surviving Arabic copy of the fatwa

As of 2006, there are four known surviving manuscripts containing the fatwa. One of them is an Arabic copy, discovered by Muhammad Abdullah 'Inan in the Vatican in 1951 and kept in the Borgiano collection of the Vatican Library. The other three were translations to Spanish written in the Arabic script (aljamiado). One of them was kept in Aix-en-Provence, France, and one in Madrid, Spain. The third aljamiado translation used to be in Madrid, but its location is currently unknown.

Since the discovery, the texts have been transcribed or translated into modern Spanish, English and German. Historian L. P. Harvey provides a near-complete English translation in his book Muslims in Spain, 1500 to 1615.
