= Xiva =

Xiva may refer to:

- Xiva, the Catalan name of Chiva, Valencia, a town in Spain
- Xiva, the Uzbek name of Khiva, a town in Uzbekistan
