= Expulsion from Spain =

Expulsion from Spain may refer to:

- Expulsion of Jews from Spain (1492 in Aragon and Castile, 1497–98 in Navarre)
- Expulsion of the Moriscos (1609–1614)

== See also ==
- Forced conversions of Muslims in Spain (1500–1502 in Castile, 1515–16 in Navarre and 1523–1526 in Aragon)
