= Alborache =

- Municipality
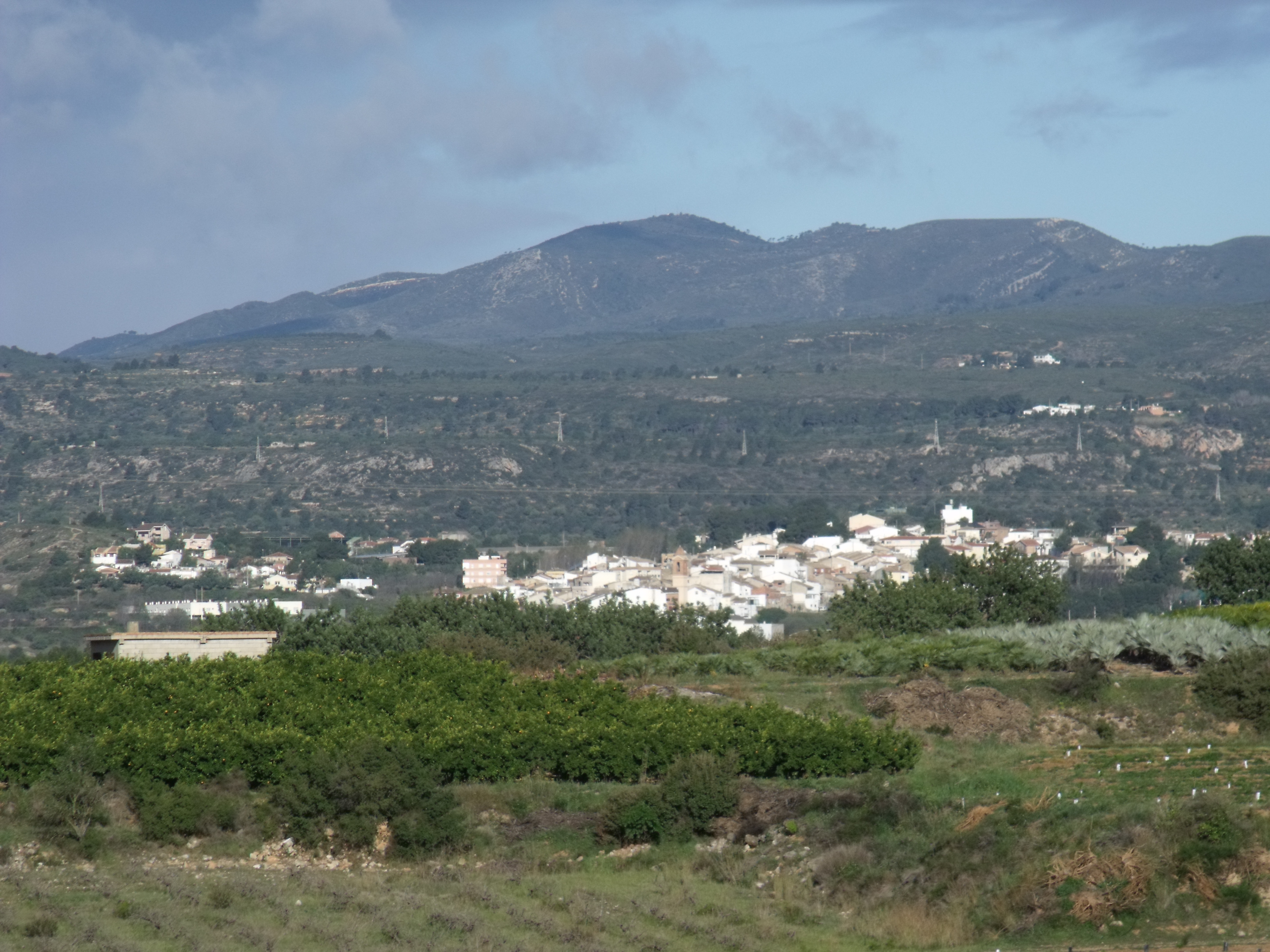
- General view

- Flag Coat of arms

- Location in Spain
- Coordinates: 39°23′30″N 0°46′16″W
- Country: Spain
- Autonomous community: Valencian Community
- Province: Valencia
- Comarca: Hoya de Buñol
- Judicial district: Chiva

Government
  - Alcalde: Miguel Pinach Monto (PP)

Area
  - Total: 27.33 km^{2} (10.55 sq mi)
- Elevation: 320 m (1,050 ft)

Population (2025-01-01)
  - Total: 1,568
  - Density: 57.37/km^{2} (148.6/sq mi)
- Demonym: Alborachero/-a
- Time zone: UTC+1 (CET)
  - Summer (DST): UTC+2 (CEST)
- Postal code: 46369
- Official language(s): Spanish

Alborache (Spanish pronunciation: [alβoˈɾatʃe], Valencian: Alboraig) is a municipality in the comarca of Hoya de Buñol in the Valencian Community, Spain.

== See also ==
- List of municipalities in Valencia
