= Hoya de Buñol =

Coordinates: 39.4638°N 0.847319°W

Hoya de Buñol Foia de Bunyol
- Comarca
- Country: Spain
- Autonomous community: Valencian Community
- Province: València / Valencia
- Capital: Buñol
- Municipalities: 9 municipalities: Alborache, Buñol, Cheste, Chiva, Dos Aguas, Godelleta, Macastre, Siete Aguas, Yátova

Area
  - Total: 817.37 km^{2} (315.59 sq mi)

Population (2006)
  - Total: 38,245
  - Density: 46.790/km^{2} (121.19/sq mi)
- Time zone: UTC+1 (CET)
  - Summer (DST): UTC+2 (CEST)
- Most populated municipality: Chiva

Hoya de Buñol (Spanish: [ˈoʝa ðe buˈɲol]; Valencian: Foia de Bunyol [ˈfɔja ðe buˈɲɔl], also [ˈfɔjɔ]) is a comarca in the province of Valencia, Valencian Community, Spain. All the towns in it are Spanish-speaking, rather than Valencian-speaking.

== Municipalities ==
Municipalities of Hoya de Buñol

- Alborache
- Buñol
- Cheste
- Chiva
- Dos Aguas
- Godelleta
- Macastre
- Siete Aguas
- Yátova
