= Siete Aguas =

- Municipality
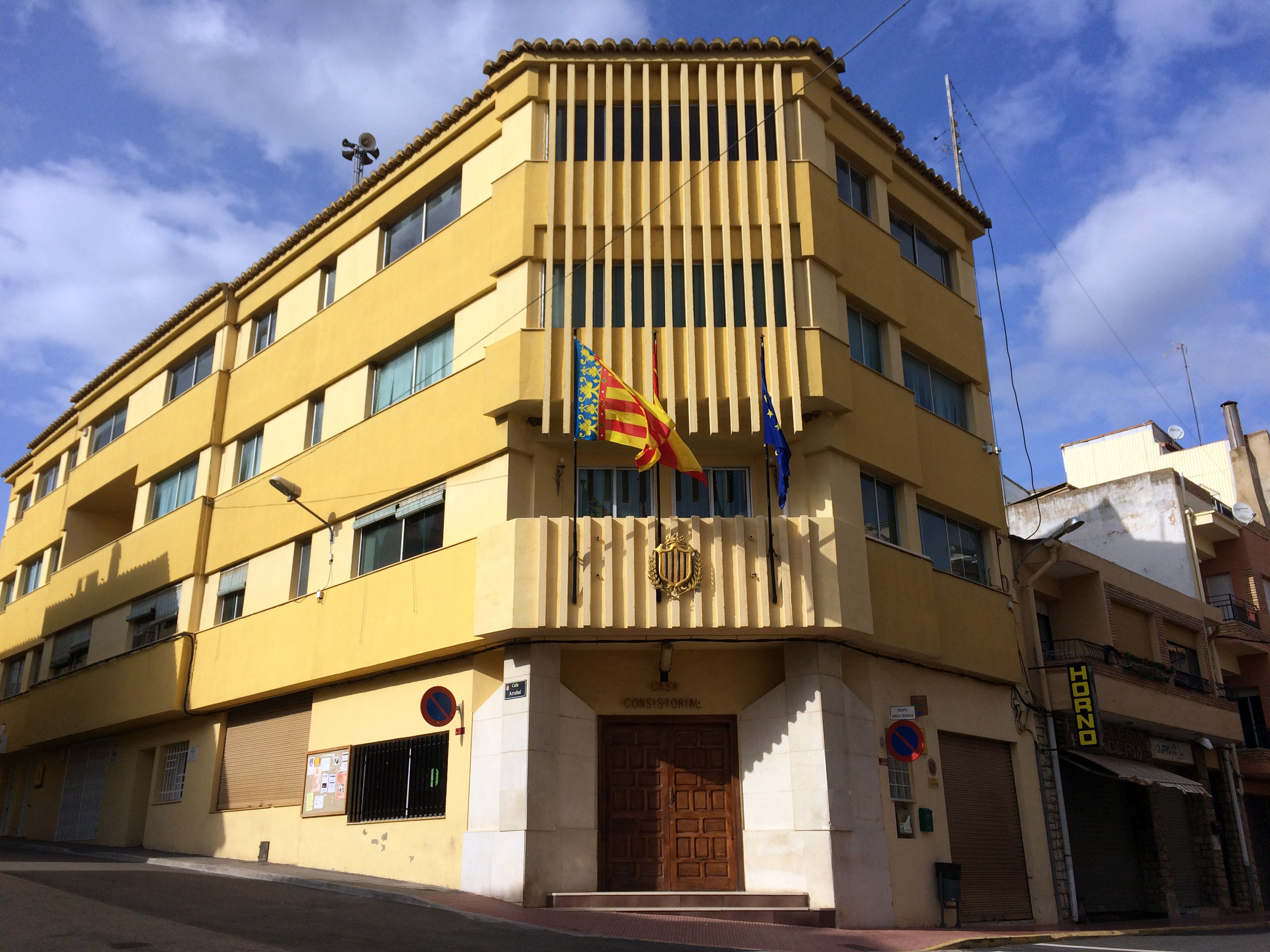
- Town hall

- Coat of arms

- Location in Spain
- Coordinates: 39°28′17″N 0°54′56″W
- Country: Spain
- Autonomous community: Valencian Community
- Province: Valencia
- Comarca: Hoya de Buñol
- Judicial district: Requena

Government
  - Alcalde: Daniel Zahonero Abril (PSPV-PSOE)

Area
  - Total: 110.60 km^{2} (42.70 sq mi)
- Elevation: 700 m (2,300 ft)

Population (2025-01-01)
  - Total: 1,289
  - Density: 11.65/km^{2} (30.19/sq mi)
- Demonym: Sieteagüense/a
- Time zone: UTC+1 (CET)
  - Summer (DST): UTC+2 (CEST)
- Postal code: 46392
- Official language(s): Spanish
- Website: Official website

Siete Aguas is a municipality in the comarca of Hoya de Buñol in the Valencian Community, Spain.

== Expulsion of Muslims ==
On November 25, 1525 Charles I of Spain issued an edict ordering the expulsions or conversions of remaining Muslims in the Crown of Aragon. Though the option of exile was available on paper, in practice it was almost impossible. Though the option of exile was available on paper, in practice it was almost impossible. In order to leave the realm, a Muslim would have had to obtain documentation from Siete Aguas on Aragon's western border, then travelled inland across the entire breadth of Castile and embark by sea in A Coruña in the northwest coast. The edict set a deadline of December 31 in the Kingdom of Valencia, and on January 26, 1526, in Aragon and Catalonia. Those who failed to arrive on time would be subject to enslavement. A subsequent edict said that those who did not leave by December 8 would need to show proof of baptism. Muslims were also ordered to "listen without replying" to Christian teachings.

== See also ==
- List of municipalities in Valencia
