= Godelleta =

- Municipality
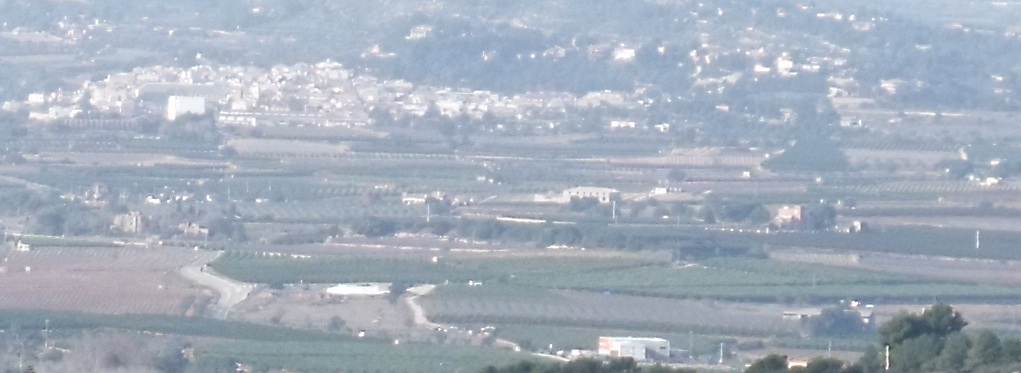

- Coat of arms

- Location in Spain
- Coordinates: 39°25′20″N 0°41′8″W
- Country: Spain
- Autonomous community: Valencian Community
- Province: Valencia
- Comarca: Hoya de Buñol
- Judicial district: Chiva

Government
  - Alcalde: Salvador Enrique Marín Clemente (Partido Popular)

Area
  - Total: 37.5 km^{2} (14.5 sq mi)
- Elevation: 266 m (873 ft)

Population (2025-01-01)
  - Total: 4,266
  - Density: 114/km^{2} (295/sq mi)
- Demonym: Godelletano/a
- Time zone: UTC+1 (CET)
  - Summer (DST): UTC+2 (CEST)
- Postal code: 46388
- Official language(s): Spanish
- Website: Official website

Godelleta is a municipality in the comarca of Hoya de Buñol in the Valencian Community, Spain.

== Notable people ==
- Fermín Zanón (1875–1944), zoologist.

== Images ==
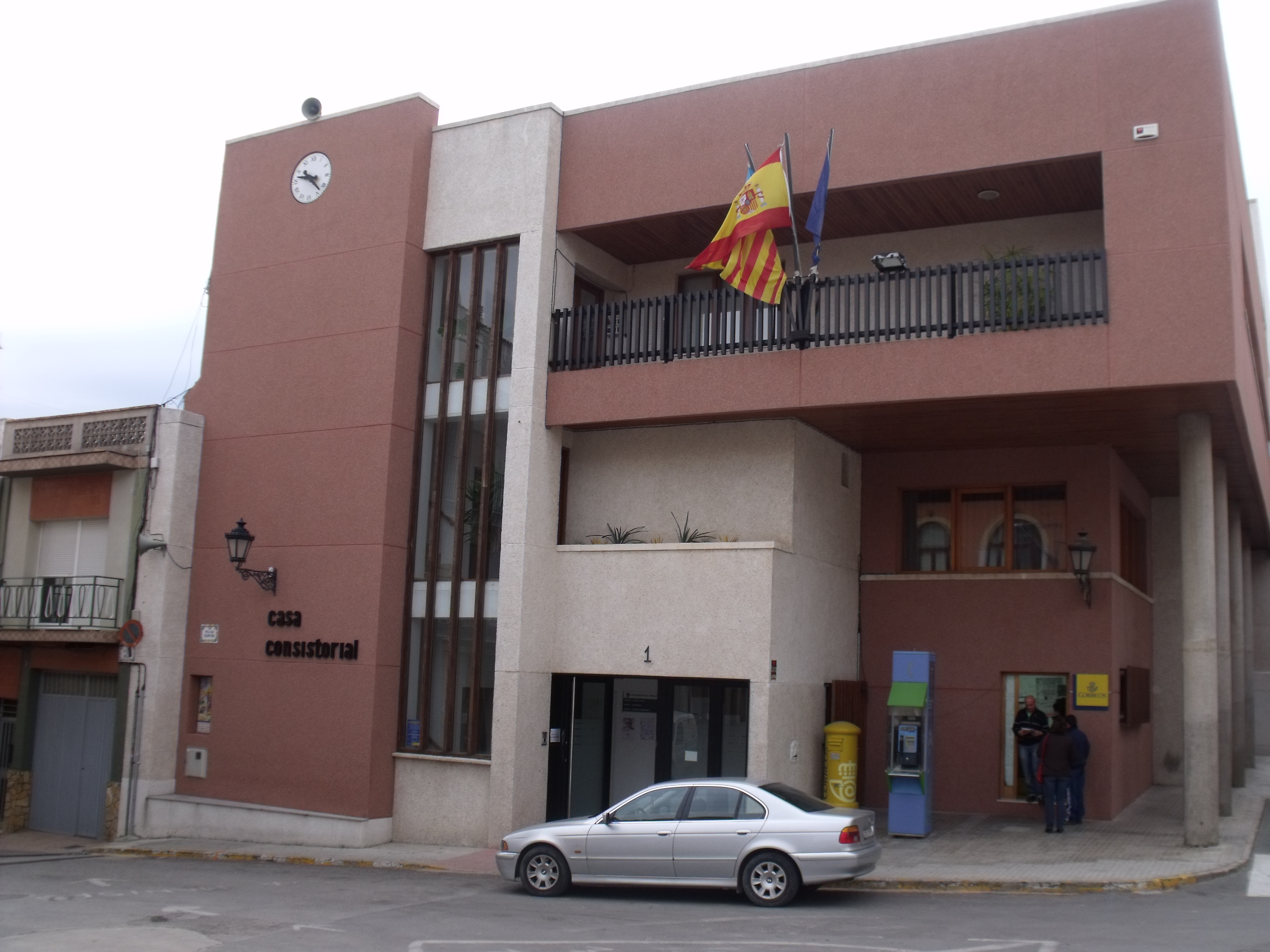
Town hall.

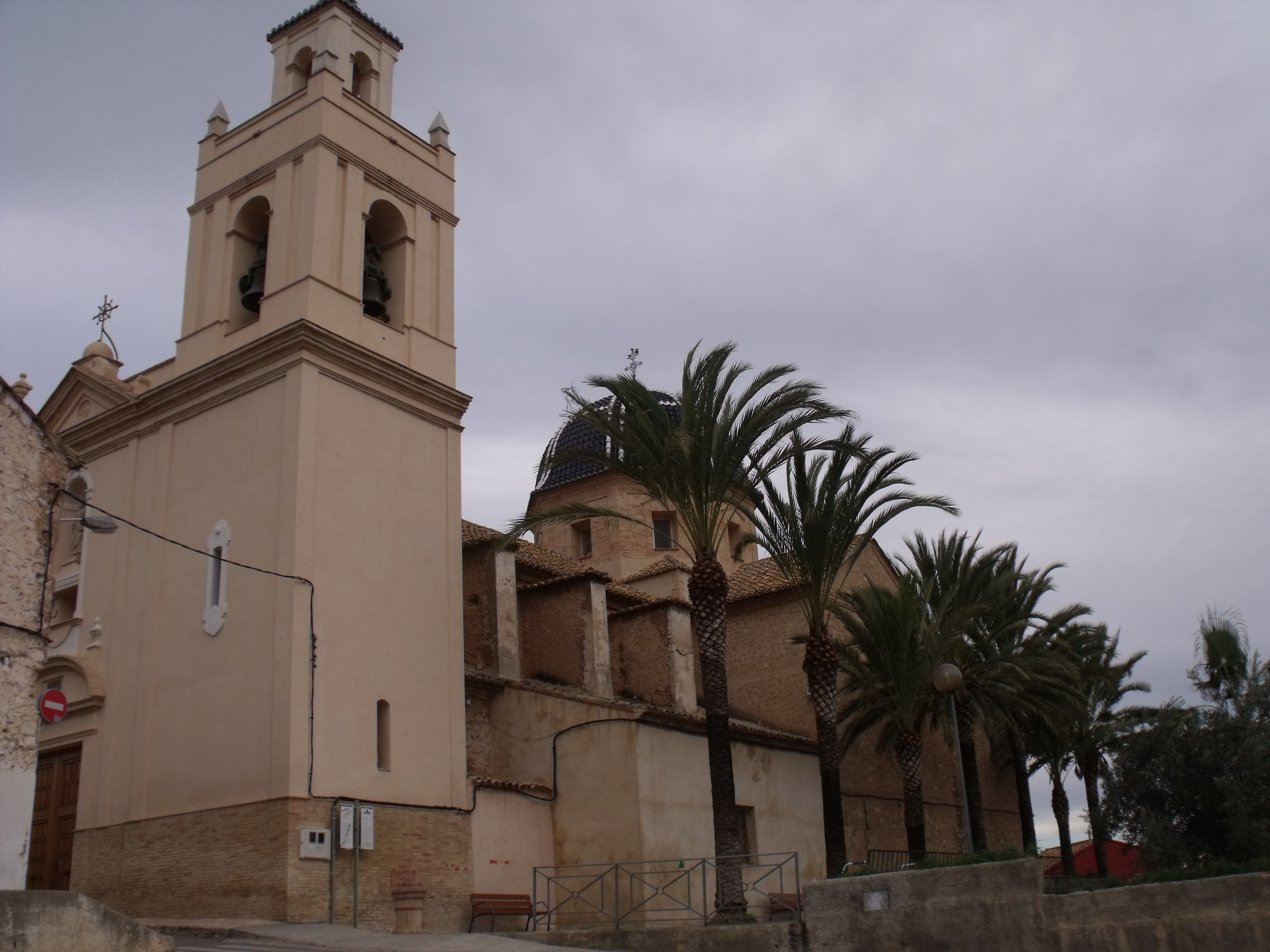
Church of Saint Peter.

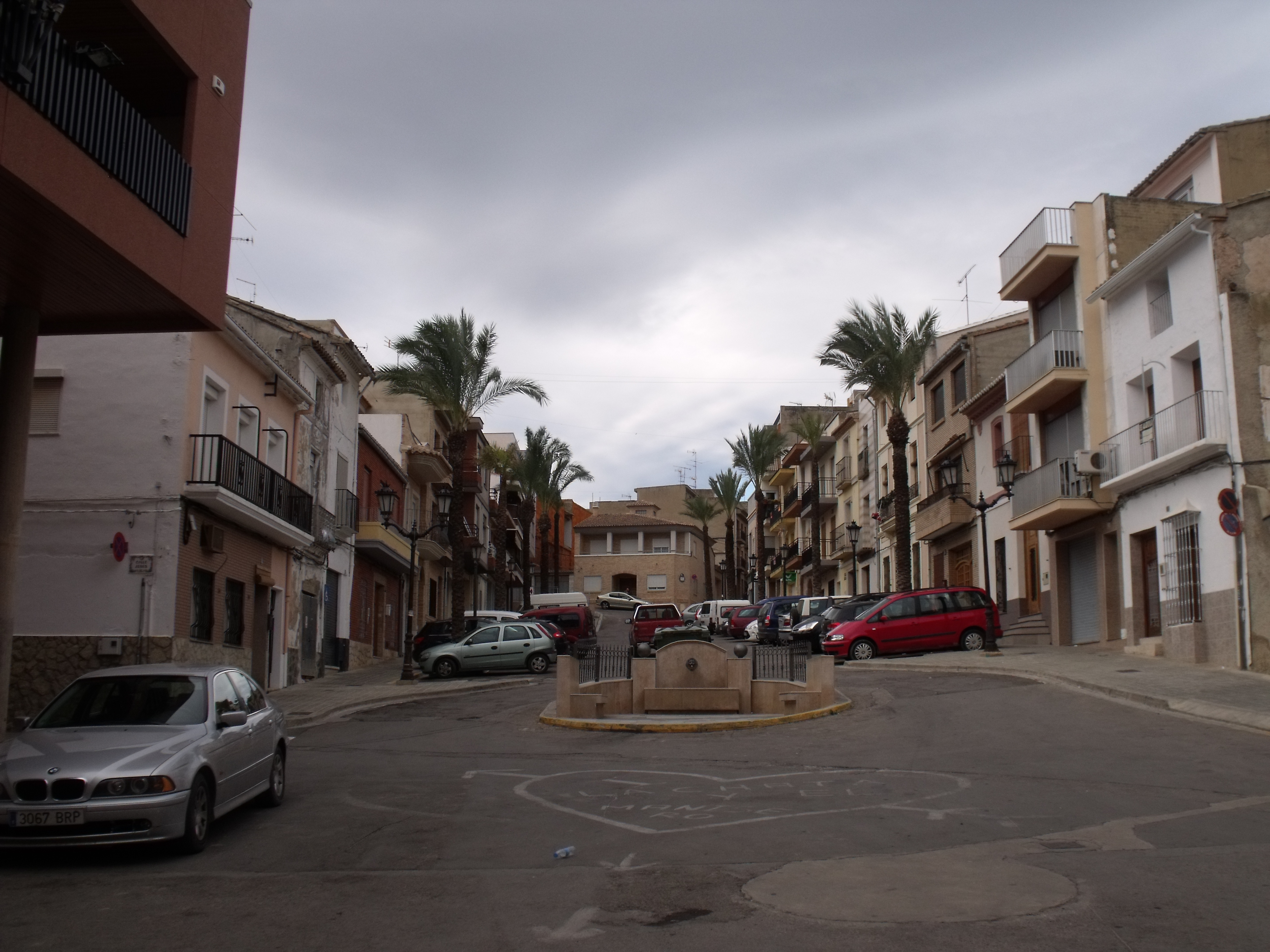
Plaza de España, center of the town.

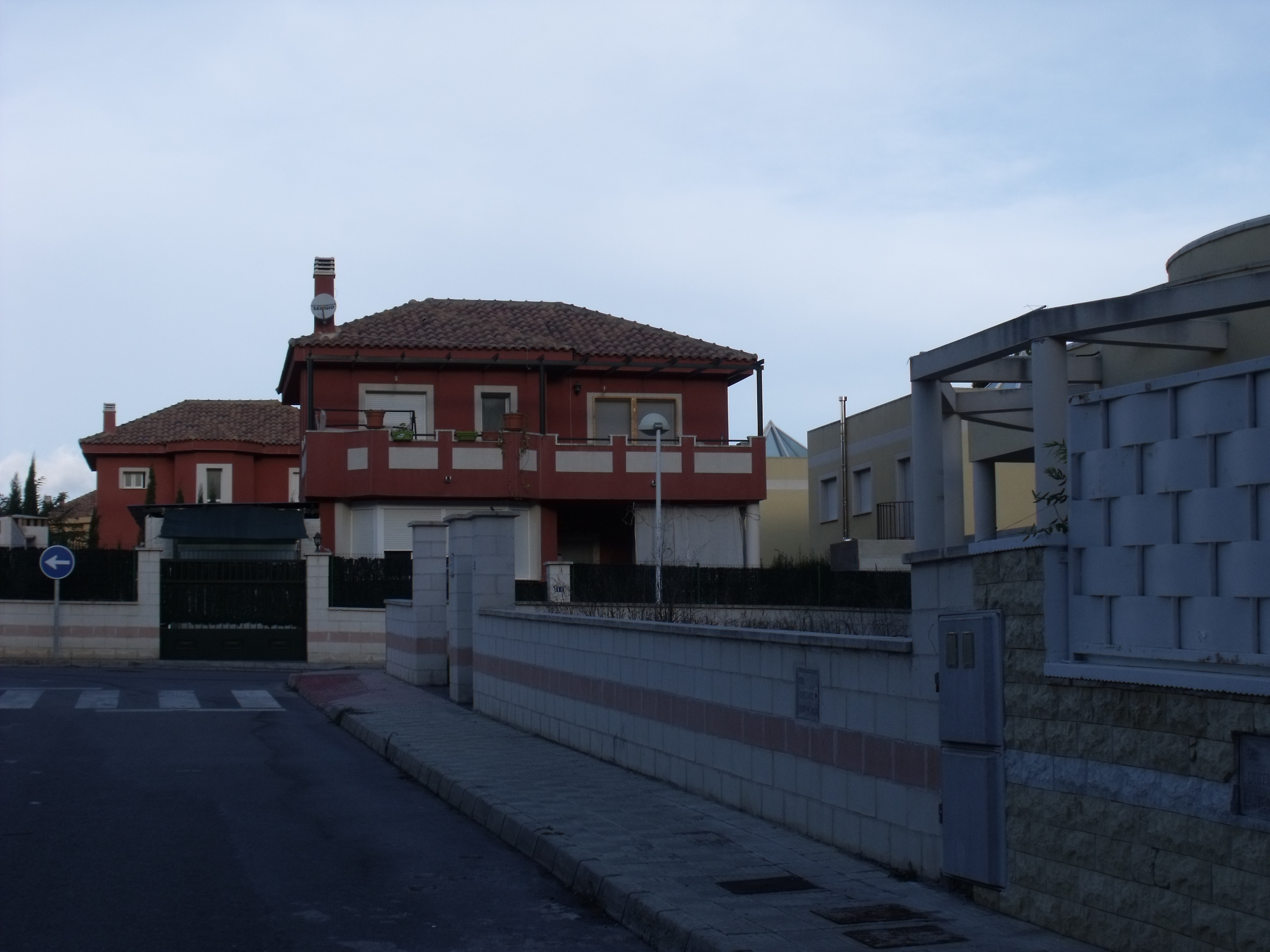
Residences used for holiday vacations are numerous in Godelleta.

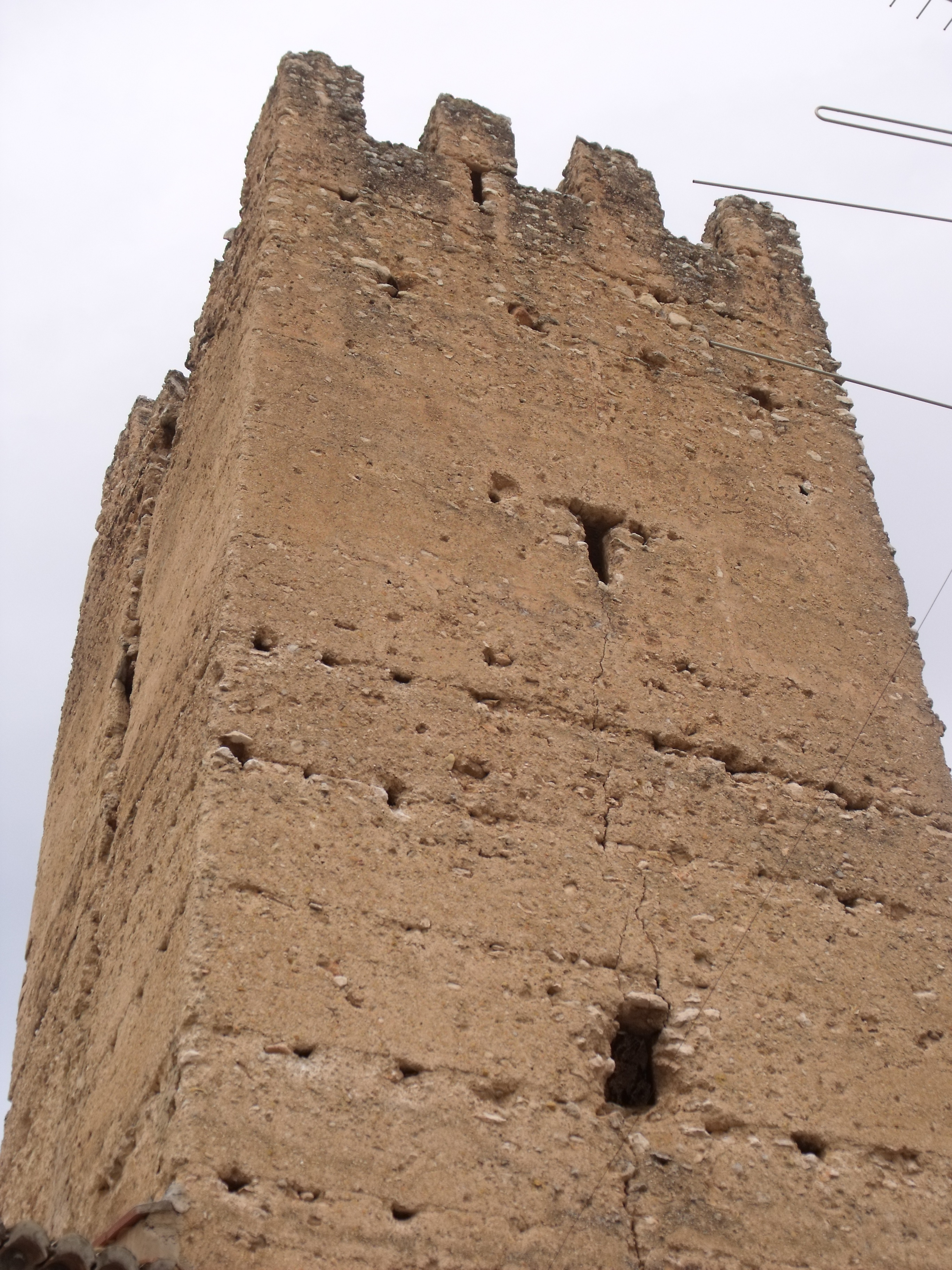
Arab tower.

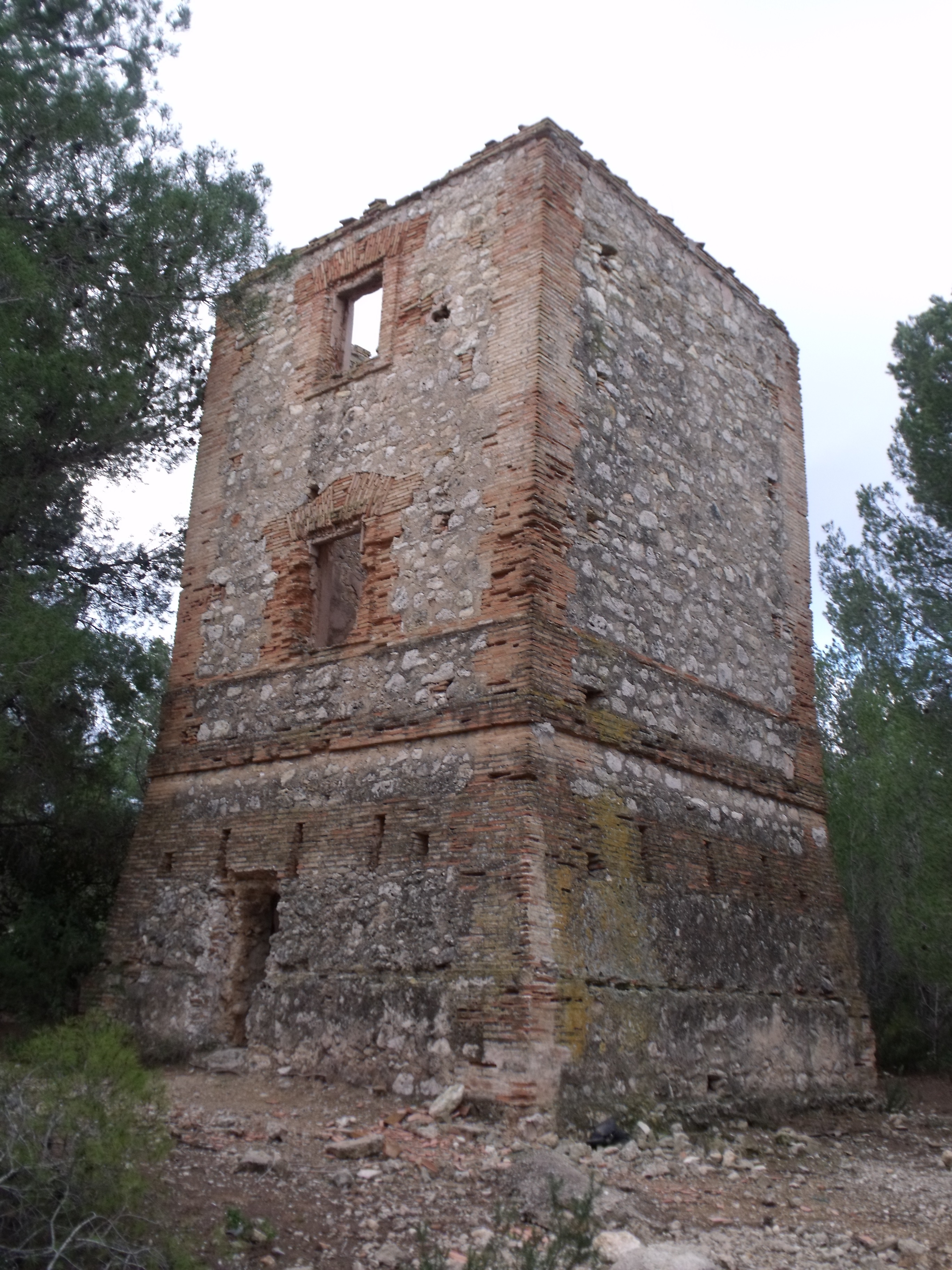
Optical telegraph tower.

== See also ==
- List of municipalities in Valencia
