= Dos Aguas =

Dos Aguas Dosaigües Dos Auguas
- Municipality
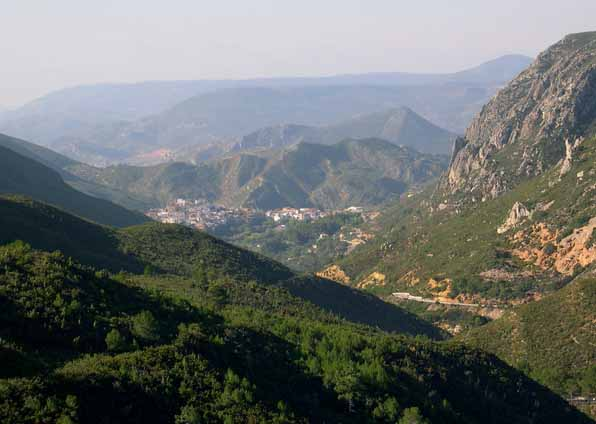

- Coat of arms

- Location of Dosaguas in Spain Dos Aguas (Valencian Community) Dos Aguas (Spain)
- Coordinates: 39°17′15″N 0°48′1″W
- Country: Spain
- Autonomous community: Valencian Community
- Province: Valencia
- Comarca: Hoya de Buñol
- Judicial district: Chiva

Government
  - Alcalde: José Ramón Grau Grau (UV)

Area
  - Total: 121.5 km^{2} (46.9 sq mi)
- Elevation: 400 m (1,300 ft)

Population (2025-01-01)
  - Total: 340
  - Density: 2.8/km^{2} (7.2/sq mi)
- Demonym: Dosagüeño/a
- Time zone: UTC+1 (CET)
  - Summer (DST): UTC+2 (CEST)
- Postal code: 46198
- Official language(s): Valencian, Spanish
- Website: Official website

Dos Aguas (Valencian: Dosaigües) is a municipality in the comarca of Hoya de Buñol in the Valencian Community, Spain.

== See also ==
- List of municipalities in Valencia
