= Macastre =

- Municipality
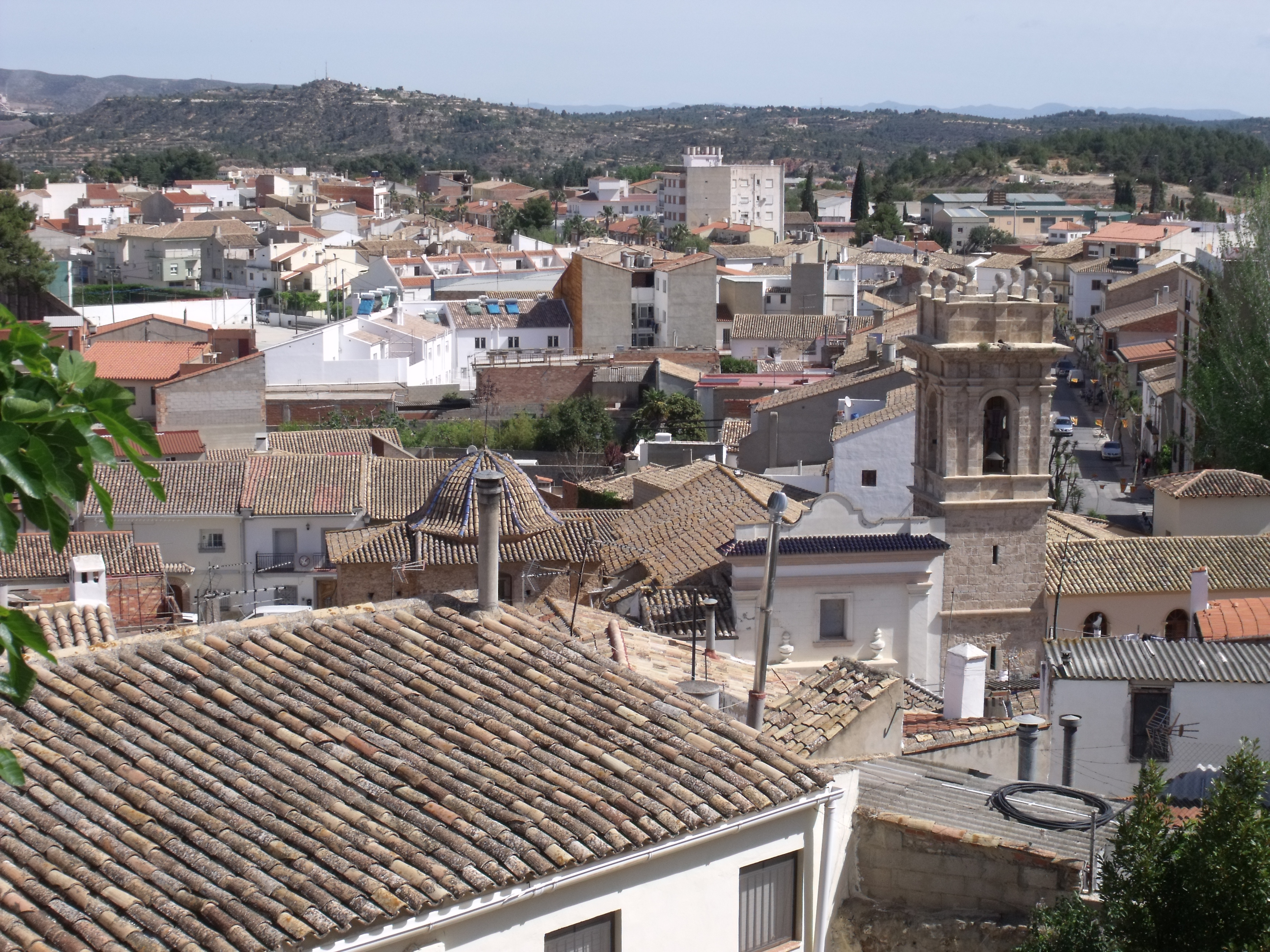

- Flag Coat of arms

- Location in Spain
- Coordinates: 39°22′53″N 0°47′14″W
- Country: Spain
- Autonomous community: Valencian Community
- Province: Valencia
- Comarca: Hoya de Buñol
- Judicial district: Chiva

Government
  - Mayor: Maria José Casero Malea (PP)

Area
  - Total: 37.66 km^{2} (14.54 sq mi)
- Elevation: 360 m (1,180 ft)

Population (2025-01-01)
  - Total: 1,461
  - Density: 38.79/km^{2} (100.5/sq mi)
- Demonym: Macastreño/a
- Time zone: UTC+1 (CET)
  - Summer (DST): UTC+2 (CEST)
- Postal code: 46368
- Official language(s): Spanish
- Website: Official website

Macastre is a municipality in the comarca of Hoya de Buñol in the Valencian Community, Spain.

== See also ==
- List of municipalities in Valencia
