= Yátova =

- Municipality
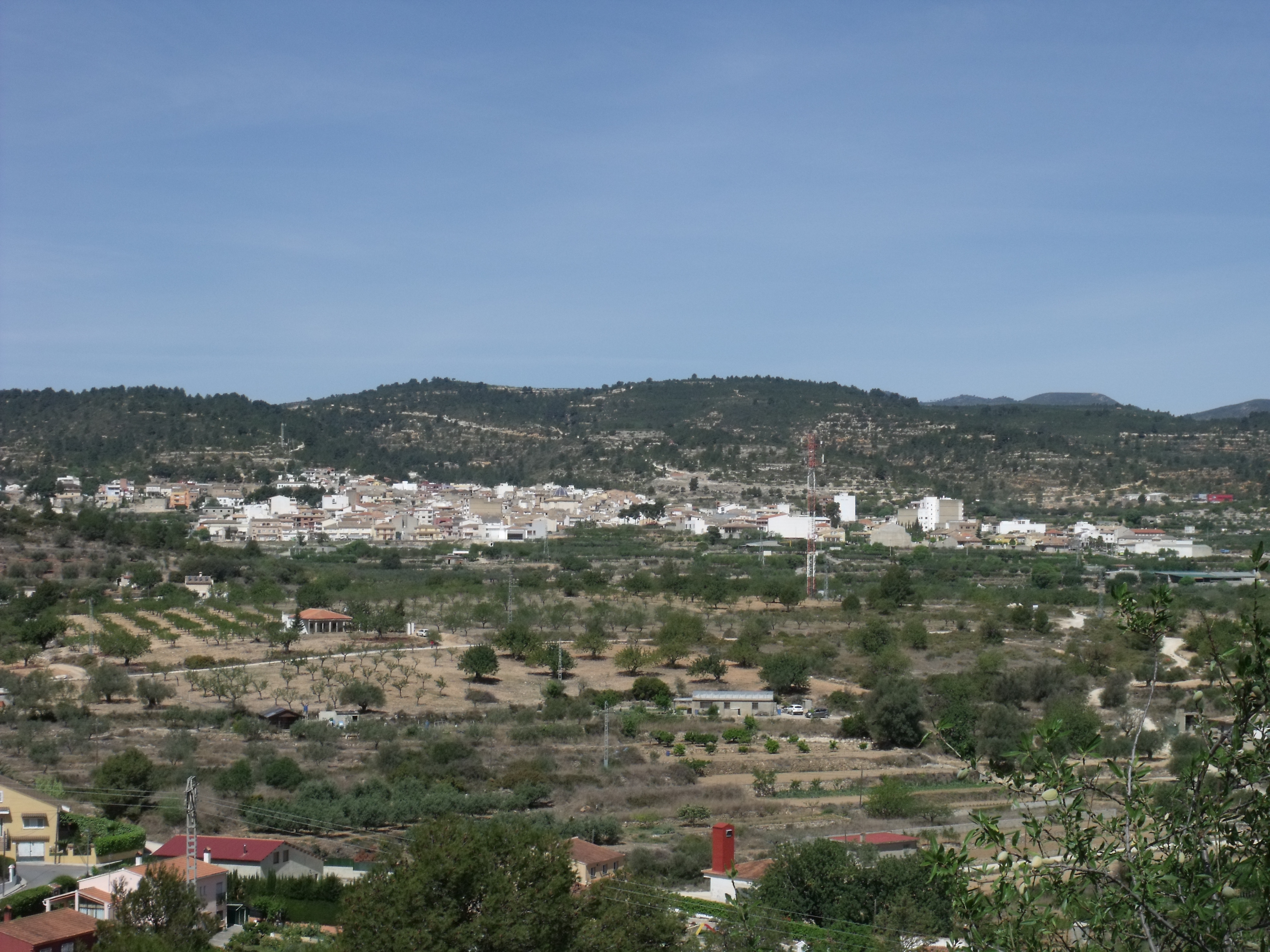

- Coat of arms

- Location in Spain
- Coordinates: 39°23′4″N 0°48′33″W
- Country: Spain
- Autonomous community: Valencian Community
- Province: Valencia
- Comarca: Hoya de Buñol
- Judicial district: Chiva

Government
  - Alcalde: Rafael Lisarde Cifre

Area
  - Total: 120.24 km^{2} (46.42 sq mi)
- Elevation: 420 m (1,380 ft)

Population (2025-01-01)
  - Total: 2,325
  - Density: 19.34/km^{2} (50.08/sq mi)
- Demonym: Yatovense
- Time zone: UTC+1 (CET)
  - Summer (DST): UTC+2 (CEST)
- Postal code: 46367
- Official language(s): Spanish
- Website: Official website

Yátova is a municipality in the comarca of Hoya de Buñol in the Valencian Community, Spain.

== See also ==
- List of municipalities in Valencia
