= Young Man of Arévalo =

16th-century Spanish crypto-Muslim

- Born: uncertain, late 15th/early 16th century Arévalo, Crown of Castile (in today's Spain)
- Died: uncertain, possibly second half of 16th century uncertain, possibly Aragon
- Writing career
- Pen name: Young Man of Arévalo; Mancebo de Arévalo
- Years active: 16th century
- Subjects: Islam, Moriscos

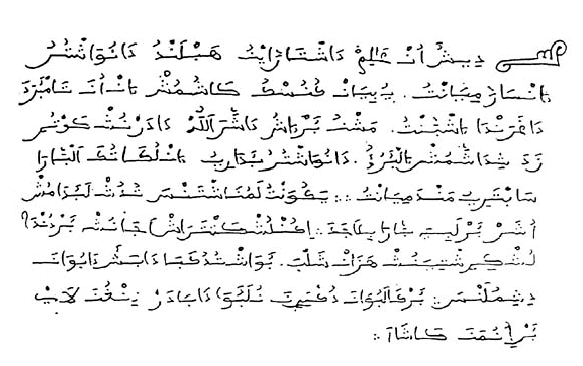
A passage from the Young Man's work. It is in Spanish written with Arabic script (aljamiado).

The Young Man of Arévalo (Spanish: el Mancebo de Arévalo) was a Morisco crypto-Muslim author from Arévalo, Castile, who was the most productive known Islamic author in Spain during the period after the forced conversion of Muslims there. He traveled widely across Spain to visit crypto-Muslim communities and wrote several works about Islam which includes accounts from his travels. His real identity and dates of birth and death are unknown, but most of his travels took place in the first half of the sixteenth century.

== Biography ==
The Young Man was born in Arévalo to a mother who converted to Christianity. His birth date is unknown, but his youth was estimated to be in the period following the end of Reconquista, marked by the Fall of Granada in 1492 and the forced conversion of Muslims in Castile, 1500–1502. When he was young, he traveled to virtually all parts of Spain except the seaboard provinces, which were forbidden to him due to his status as Morisco. Places he visited include Alcántara, Almagro, Astorga, Ávila, Gandia, Granada, Jaén, Ocaña, Requena, Ronda, Segovia, and Zaragoza. He collaborated with Bray de Reminjo, the faqih of the village of Cadrete in Aragon, to write an Islamic religious manual called Brief compendium of our sacred law and sunna, in the 1530s. At this point he was presumed to have been a reputable writer. Bray de Reminjo described him as "intellectual", a Castilian from Arévalo, and described that in addition to speaking Spanish and being well-versed in aljamiado, he also read Arabic, Hebrew, Greek, and Latin. His works show his familiarity with the Quran, the writings of Thomas à Kempis, especially The Imitation of Christ, as well as the medieval novel La Celestina. His familiarity with Christian works was likely the result of his being obligated to attend missionary sermons.

Accounts of his travels included participating in a secret congregational ritual prayer (salat jama'ah) in Zaragoza, meeting with Muslim notables and preachers, including some women, and collecting alms to go for pilgrimage to Mecca. It is unclear whether he was ultimately successful in visiting Mecca, given that travel out of the country was illegal for Moriscos. Throughout his writings he showed deep conviction that Islam was the right faith and that it would triumph again in Spain within his lifetime.

== Works ==
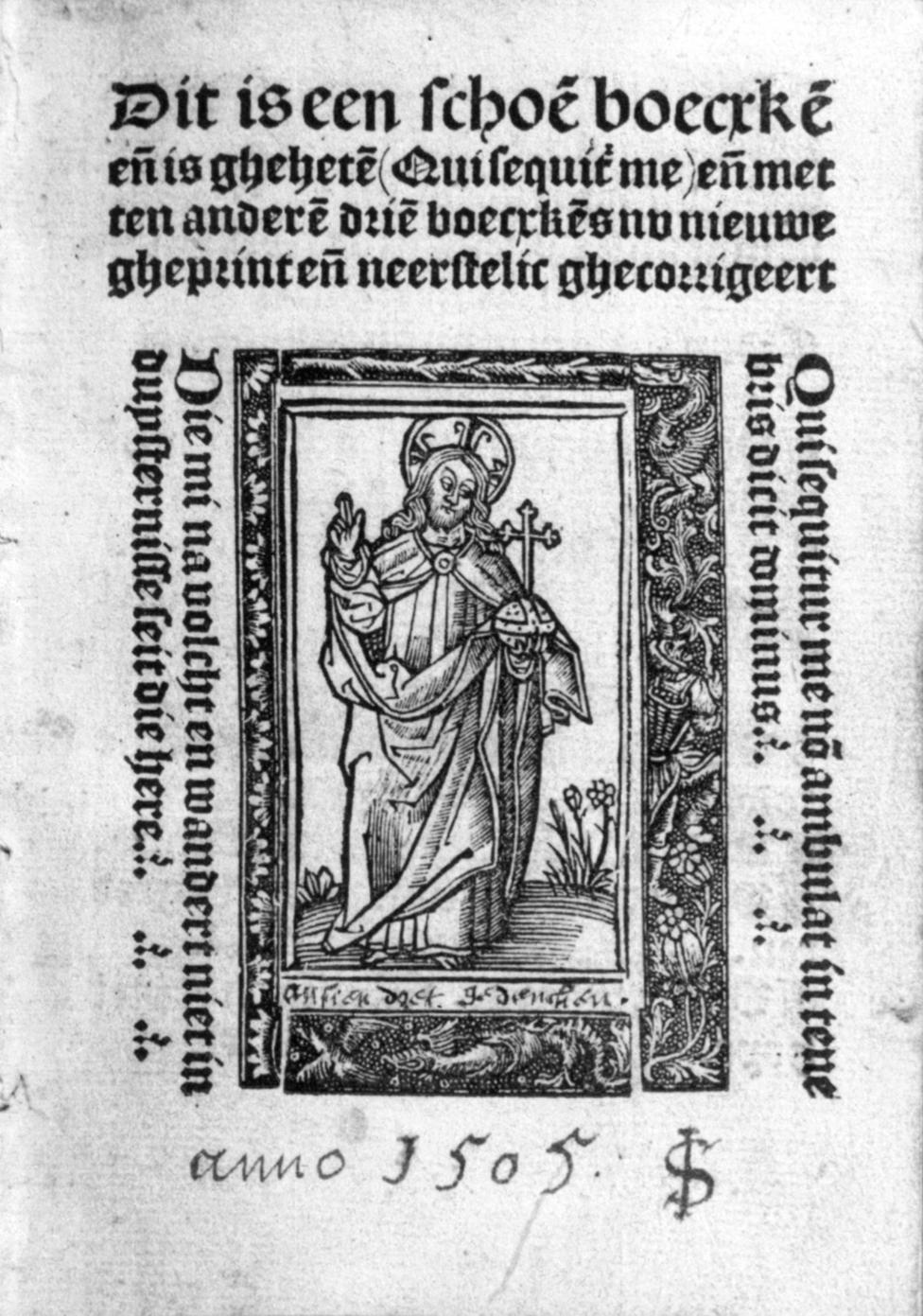
The Imitation of Christ included passages that were likely adopted in the Young Man's Tafsira.

He wrote at least three extant works, the Brief compendium of our sacred law and sunna (c. 1533), the Tafsira (c. 1533), and the Summary of the Account and Spiritual Exercise (c. shortly before 1550), all written in Spanish with Arabic script (aljamiado), and primarily about religious topics. In addition to the religious content, the works included accounts of his travels, his meetings with other clandestine Muslims, and descriptions of their religious practices and discussions. These accounts and reminiscences provide historians with information about the crypto-Muslim community in fifteenth-century Spain and their practices.

The Brief Compendium is a work of fiqh (Islamic jurisprudence), covering topics of ibadah (Islamic acts of worship) and Islamic economics. It was written in collaboration with Bray de Reminjo, marking a rare collaboration between Castilian (represented by the Young Man) and Aragonese (by Bray) Muslim traditions. The Tafsira is a tafsir or a commentary of the Quran. The Summary is a religious book on topics of devotion and piety.

Spanish scholar Pascual de Gayangos y Arce mentioned in 1839 of having seen an additional work he called The Pilgrimage of the Young Man in Madrid, but this work is now lost.

In 1980, Spanish author Gregorio Fonseca Antuña discovered close similarities between passages in the Summary and passages from Thomas à Kempis's 15th-century work The Imitation of Christ, a Christian devotional book. The passages were often adapted to replace specific Christian contexts and features with Islamic ones while keeping the spiritual and moral meaning intact. These similarities occur frequently throughout the book, including in long passages. According to historian L. P. Harvey, Kempis' influence is "established beyond doubt", and could not have been due to chance. The Young Man did not cite Kempis as sources for the passages, and frequently attributed the passages to Islamic scholars such as al-Ghazali and Ibn Arabi, misleadingly. The adaptation of Christian devotional literature in his Islamic work could be the result of his being obligated to attend missionary sermons, and a lack of access to actual Islamic literature. In contrast to the Summary, the Young Man's other works show considerable originality.

== Possible identity ==
Historian L. P. Harvey proposed that the Young Man of Arévalo might have been the same person as Agustín de Ribera, a Morisco from Arévalo who claimed to be a prophet and had the epithet of el mozo (the lad), although he admitted that the theory had a lot of difficulties that he had not resolved. Agustín was arrested by the Spanish Inquisition in 1540 and records from his interrogation survived.

== Legacy ==
The Young Man's works became known throughout the Morisco community, and he achieved fame as a scholar. His works were copied up to the end of the sixteenth century, and cited by Morisco authors up to the beginning of the seventeenth century, just before the expulsion of the Moriscos.

He was the most productive known Islamic author in Spain during the period after the forced conversion of Muslims there: today historians often single him out for attention in studies of Morisco literature in this period.
