= Chiva, Spain =

Chiva
- Municipality
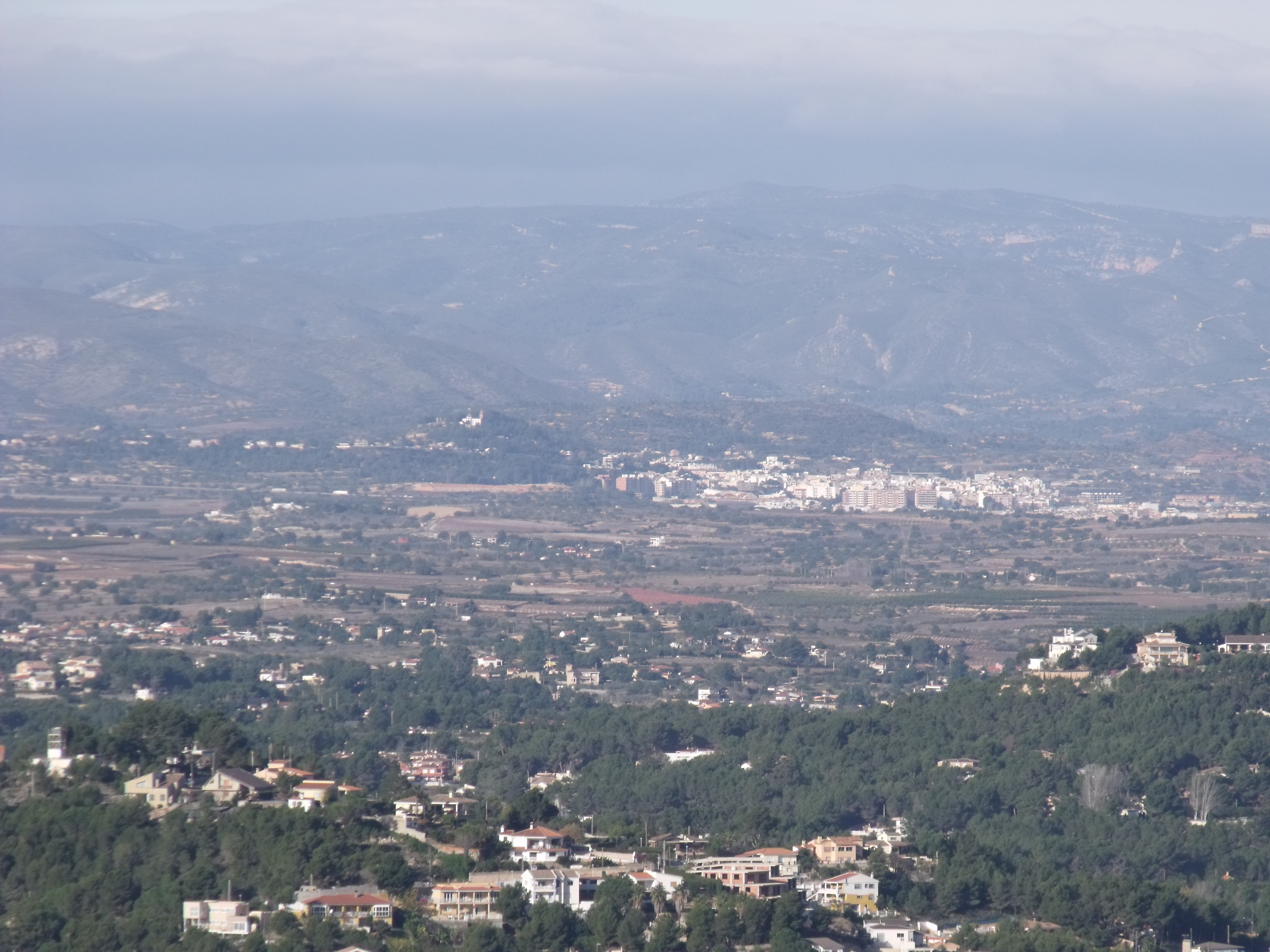

- Flag Coat of arms

- Location in Spain
- Coordinates: 39°28′17″N 0°43′11″W
- Country: Spain
- Autonomous community: Valencian Community
- Province: Valencia
- Comarca: Hoya de Buñol
- Judicial district: Chiva

Government
  - Alcalde: Emilio Morales Gaitán (2015) (Compromís)

Area
  - Total: 178.7 km^{2} (69.0 sq mi)
- Elevation: 270 m (890 ft)

Population (2025-01-01)
  - Total: 17,951
  - Density: 100.5/km^{2} (260.2/sq mi)
- Demonym: Chivano/a
- Time zone: UTC+1 (CET)
  - Summer (DST): UTC+2 (CEST)
- Postal code: 46370
- Official language(s): Spanish
- Website: Official website

Chiva is a municipality in the comarca of Hoya de Buñol in the Valencian Community, Spain. It has a population of 16,750 inhabitants (INE 2023). It is a Spanish-speaking town, in which Spanish has the legally recognised linguistic predominance compared to Valencian, co-official regional language of the Valencian Community. Part of the Hoya de Buñol region, it is located 31 kilometres inland following the A3 Highway from the capital of Valencia in direction towards Madrid.

Chiva has the largest municipal park in Valencia; the mountainous Paraje Natural Municipal Sierra de Chiva, with a surface area of more than 5,500 ha.. This enclave is considered to have ecological, scenic and cultural significance, for which it justified its status as a protected area.

== History ==
Remains from the Metal Age, the Iberian and Roman periods have been found in Chiva. It seems that the first traces of human presence in what is now the municipality of Chiva appear in the Epipalaeolithic period, between 8,000 and 5,000 BC. After many centuries under the Al-Andalus muslim rule, Chiva was conquered around 1246 or 1247 by King James I of Aragon as part of the Reconquista efforts to reclaim the Iberian Peninsula to Christianity. A large part of the Muslim population remained, and the town constantly changed lordships in the centuries that followed.

When the Revolt of the Brotherhoods broke out in 1519, the Agermanados demanded the baptism of the Muslim population, which the large Muslim population of Chiva strongly opposed. The expulsion of the Moors in 1609 led to an almost total depopulation. In 1797, an important demographic recovery was noted, mostly due to the development of agriculture, both from dry farmed crops and those based on irrigation.

Pascual Madoz between 1845-1850 reported the existence of some industrial development related to agricultural activities, although it was the later arrival of the railway and the expansion of vineyards that brought about a greater economic boost. In the 20th century, the workers' movement developed significantly, as shown by the repercussions of the anarchist strike of 1911 and the crisis of 1917, as well as the good electoral results of the PSOE in 1919. During the 20th century, the population experienced a greater intensification of crops, greater industrial development and significant demographic growth. The crisis in the wine sector led to a period of economic and population recession that lasted until the 1970s, when there was a new expansion based on industrial development and the creation of an important nucleus of second homes, both favoured by the proximity to the metropolitan area of Valencia.

During the October 2024 Spain floods, a year's worth of rain fell on Chiva on 29 October 2024.

== Monuments ==
- The Ruins of Castle of Chiva.
- Chiva Tower, called La Torreta.
- The Chiva Optical Telegraphy Tower is an optical tower, with gun ports, which formed part of the line from Madrid to Valencia.
- Chapel of the Virgen del Castillo.
- Archpriestly Church of San Juan Bautista, 18th century.
- Collection of paintings by the Valencian Baroque painter José Vergara Gimeno.
- Fountain of the 21 spouts, modernist.

== Relevant people from Chiva ==
- Luis Antonio García Navarro, music conductor (born in Chiva 1941).

== See also ==
- List of municipalities in Valencia
