= Ahmad ibn Abi Jum'ah =

Maliki scholar of Islamic law (d. 1511)

- أحمد بن أبي جمعة

Personal life
- Born: Oran, Zayyanid Sultanate
- Died: 3 June 1511 Fez, Wattasid Sultanate
- Region: Maghreb, North Africa; Crown of Castile
- Notable work: Oran fatwa
- Other names: Abu al-Abbas Ahmad ibn Abi Jum'ah al-Maghrawi al-Wahrani; Ubaydallah
- Occupation: Professor of Islamic law

Religious life
- Religion: Islam
- Jurisprudence: Maliki

Abu al-Abbas Ahmad ibn Abi Jum'ah al-Maghrawi al-Wahrani (Arabic: أبو العباس احمد بن جمعة المغراوي الوهراني; died 3 June 1511) was an Algerian Maliki scholar of Islamic law, active in North Africa from the end of the fifteenth century until his death. He was identified as the author of the 1504 fatwa commonly named the Oran fatwa, instructing the Muslims in Spain about how to secretly practice Islam, and granting comprehensive dispensations for them to publicly conform to Christianity and performing acts normally forbidden in Islam when necessary to survive. Because of his authorship of the fatwa he is often referred to as "the Mufti of Oran", although he likely issued the fatwa in Fez, not in Oran and he did not have any official capacity in either city.

== Name ==
His name was given in various forms and rendition, both by surviving manuscripts of his works and by modern scholars. His full name is made up of several names:

- Abu al-Abbas, meaning "father of al-Abbas", possibly a kunya or teknonym
- Ahmad is presumably his given name.
- ibn (or bin) Abi (or Abu) Jum'ah is a patronymic name, meaning "son of Abu Jum'ah"
- al-Maghrawi is a nisba, a name signifying place of origin or tribal affiliation. Its meaning is contested. An opinion, argued by Mikel de Epalza and Jean Cantineau said that it means "of Almagro", implying that he was a Spanish Muslim who had later fled to North Africa. Devin J. Stewart, while agreeing that al-Maghrawi must be a toponymic, instead argued that it refers to Maghrawah, an area in north-western Algeria. While an opinion, argued by L. P. Harvey held that it means "of the Maghrawa [tribe]".
- al-Wahrani is another nisba, which means "of Oran", referring to the city of Oran (Arabic: وهران, Wahran) in Western Algeria.

In some of the manuscripts the name "Ubaydallah" is also added, a theophoric name that means "the little servant of God", and was likely added as a pious formula.

His various names, and the various renditions and combinations that appear in various manuscripts and transliterations, have given rise to occasional confusions. The renditions that appeared include: "Ahmed ben Juma'a", "Ubaydallah Ahmed Ben Bu Jumu'ah", "Ahmad fijo de Abu Jumu'ah", "Obaydala Ahmed Abenabigiomoa", "Ubayd Allah al-Wahrani" and "Ahmad Bu Jum'a".

== Biography ==
There are several contradicting theories about his birth and childhood. He may have been born in Oran, then part of the Zayyanid kingdom of Tlemcen, or in the nearby region of Maghrawah. In either way, he was presumably of Berber origin and belonged to the Maghrawah tribal confederation. Some opinions also say that he was a native of Spain, born in Almagro. His date of birth is unknown, but estimated to be in the mid-fifteenth century.

He studied in Oran in his early years, then moved to Tlemcen, the nearest major capital to get an education in Islamic law and theology. He studied under Muhammad ibn Yusuf al-Sanusi, a well-known Islamic scholar. In Tlemcen he wrote Jami' Jawami' al-Ikhtisar wa al-Tibyan and had a teaching position. At some point (estimated to be around 1493), he moved to Fez and obtained a salaried position as a professor of law. He issued the Oran fatwa in 1504, likely when he was in Fez. He died in Fez in 3 June 1511. His son, Muhammad Shaqrun would also become an Islamic scholar.

Because of his authorship of the Oran fatwa, he has frequently been referred to as "the Mufti of Oran", suggesting that he wrote the fatwa there and he had some sort of official authority as a mufti. However, Devin J. Stewart noted that he was active in Fez (in today's Morocco), not Oran, at the time of the fatwa's composition, and likely penned it there. His name did not appear in the list of official muftis of Fez, so it is likely that the fatwa was not issued in any official capacity, but as a private mufti issuing a legal opinion on request. In theory, any competent Islamic jurist could issue a fatwa, although normally it carries less weight than ones from an official mufti.

== Works ==
=== Oran fatwa ===
He is best known for the responsum fatwa commonly named by modern scholar as the Oran fatwa. The name "Oran fatwa" itself was given by modern scholars due to the name al-Wahrani ("of Oran") that appeared in the text as part of his name. The fatwa instructed the Muslims in Spain about how to secretly practice Islam, and granted comprehensive dispensations for them to publicly conform to Christianity and perform acts normally forbidden in Islam when necessary to survive. The fatwa, while reaffirming the orthodox obligation of all Muslims, sets out detailed relaxations of the sharia requirements for the benefit of the persecuted Muslims of Spain. The fatwa allowed for outwardly conforming to Christianity and performing acts that are ordinarily forbidden in Islamic law when necessary to survive, while maintaining internal convictions against such acts.

The fatwa enjoyed wide currency among Muslims and Moriscos (Muslims nominally converted to Christianity and their descendants) in Spain, and one of the surviving aljamiado translations was dated at 1564, 60 years after the original fatwa. The fatwa has been described as the "key theological document" to understand the practice of Spanish Muslims following the Reconquista up to the expulsion of the Moriscos.

=== Other works ===
He wrote Jami' Jawami' al-Ikhtisar wa al-Tibyan fima ya'rudu bayna al-mu'allimin wa aba al-sibyan ("The Epitome of Epitomes of Competence and Explanation, on What Arises Between Teachers and the Fathers of Boys"), a treatise on elementary education while in Tlemcen.

== See also ==
- Ahmad al-Wansharisi
- Islam in Spain
  - Mudéjar
  - Morisco
