= Valencian Community =

Autonomous community of Spain

Valencian Community (Note: English pronunciation: /vəˈlɛnsiən ... , -ʃ(i)ən ... / və-LEN-see-ən ..., -sh(ee-)ən ...; Valencian: Comunitat Valenciana, pronounced [komuniˈtad valensiˈana]; Spanish: Comunidad Valenciana, pronounced [komuniˈðað βalenˈθjana].)^{[1]} Comunitat Valenciana (Valencian) Comunidad Valenciana (Spanish)
- Autonomous community
- Flag Coat of arms
- Anthem: Himne de la Comunitat Valenciana ("Anthem of the Valencian Community")
- Location of the Valencian Community in Spain
- Interactive map of the Valencian Community
- Coordinates: 39°30′N 0°45′W
- Country: Spain
- Formation: Main events: 1238 (Laws of Valencia); 1305 (Treaty of Elche) (Note: Revision of the Treaty of Ágreda in 1304.); 1707 (Nova Planta); 1833 (Regionalization); 1982 (Autonomous community)
- Statute(s) of Autonomy: Statute(s): 1982 (First Statute); 2006 (Second Statute)
- Capital (and largest city): Valencia
- Subdivision(s): Province(s): Province of Alicante; Province of Castellón; Province of Valencia

Government
  - Type: Devolved government in a constitutional monarchy
  - Body: Generalitat Valenciana
  - President: Juanfran Pérez Llorca (PP)
  - Speaker: Llanos Massó (Vox)
  - Legislature: Corts Valencianes

Area
  - Total: 23,265.23 km^{2} (8,982.76 sq mi)
  - Rank: 8th in Spain

Population (2025)
  - Total: 5,425,182
  - Rank: 4th in Spain
  - Density: 233.1884/km^{2} (603.9552/sq mi)
- Demonyms: Valencian • valencià, -ana (Val.) • valenciano/a (Sp.)
- Official language(s): Valencian; Spanish

GDP
  - Total: €148.284 billion (2024)
  - Per capita: €27,333 (2024)

HDI
  - HDI (2022): 0.897 (very high · 11th)
- Time zone: CET (UTC+1)
  - Summer (DST): CEST (UTC+2)
- Postal code prefixes: 03XXX (A); 12XXX (CS); 46XXX (V)
- Telephone code: +34 96
- ISO 3166 code: ES-VC
- Currency: Euro (€) (EUR)
- Official holiday: October 9th
- Patron saint(s): Saint Vincent
- Website: gva.es

The Valencian Community is an autonomous community of Spain. It is the fourth most populous Spanish autonomous community after Andalusia, Catalonia and the Community of Madrid with more than 5 million inhabitants. Its eponymous capital and most populous city is Valencia, the third-largest city and metropolitan area in Spain. It is located along the Mediterranean coast on the east side of the Iberian Peninsula. It borders Catalonia to the north, Aragon and Castilla–La Mancha to the west, and Murcia to the south, and the Balearic Islands are to its east. The Valencian Community is divided into three provinces: Castellón, Valencia and Alicante.

According to Valencia's Statute of Autonomy, the Valencian people are a "historical nationality". Their origins date back to the 1238 conquest by James the Conqueror of the Taifa of Valencia. The newly founded Kingdom of Valencia enjoyed its own legal entity and administrative institutions as a component of the Crown of Aragon, under the purview of the Furs of Valencia. Valencia experienced its Golden Age in the 15th century, as it became the Crown's economic capital. Local institutions and laws continued during the dynastic union of the early modern Spanish Monarchy, but were suspended in 1707 as a result of the Spanish War of Succession. Valencian nationalism emerged towards the end of the 19th century, leading to the modern conception of the Valencian Country. (Note: Valencian: País Valencià, pronounced [paˈiz valensiˈa]; Spanish: País Valenciano, pronounced [paˈis βalenˈθjano].) The current autonomous community under the Generalitat Valenciana self-government institution was established in 1982 after the Spanish Transition.

Official languages are Valencian (the official and traditional name used in the Valencian Community for the Romance language also known as Catalan) (Note: The Valencian Normative Dictionary of the Valencian Academy of the Language states that Valencian is a "Romance language spoken in the Valencian Community, as well as in Catalonia, the Balearic Islands, the French department of the Pyrénées-Orientales, the Principality of Andorra, the eastern flank of Aragon and the Sardinian town of Alghero (unique in Italy), where it receives the name of 'Catalan'.") and Spanish. As of 2025, the population of the Valencian Community comprised 11.0% of the Spanish population.

== Etymology ==
The city of Valencia (capital of the Valencian Community) was founded by the Romans under the name of Valentia Edetanorum, or simply Valentia, which translates to "strength" or "valour", in full "strength of the Edetani" (the centre of Edetania was Edeta, an important old Iberian settlement 25 km north of Valencia, in what is now modern day Llíria, other important nearby settlements included Arse–Saguntum, Saetabis and Dianium).

With the establishment of the Muslim Taifa of Valencia, during the Al-Andalus period, the name developed to بلنسية (Balansiya). The modern names of the city are Valencia (Spanish) and València (Valencian). The older spellings Valéncia, Valençia, Ualençia, Ualéncia and Ualència are also found in pre-reform Spanish and Valencian texts.

To distinguish it from its capital city, a number of names have been used for the region. After the Christian conquest, it became the Kingdom of Valencia. In the last decades, Valencian Community has become the preferred name to avoid any controversy.

=== Naming ===
Comunitat Valenciana ("Valencian Community") is the only denomination with official status in its Statute of Autonomy. Although it is the only name used by the institutions, this legal document includes in its Preamble other denominations that portray the history and nature of the territory: Regne de València ("Kingdom of Valencia") and País Valencià ("Valencian Country" or "Land of Valencia").

Comunitat Valenciana (in Valencian) is the sole official name and the one used in public administration and by most media, in both Spanish and Valencian. It is a neologism adopted after the democratic transition to resolve the conflict between two competing names then in use: "Valencian Country" and "Kingdom of Valencia". "Valencian Community" is the standard English translation of the official name. In Spanish, both Comunitat Valenciana and, less commonly, Comunidad Valenciana are used.

"Valencian Country" (País Valencià) came into common use during the Renaixença in the late 19th century and became firmly established during the Second Spanish Republic. It later gained further currency through the work of Joan Fuster in the 1960s, who framed it as part of the Catalan Countries. The term is seen as emphasizing the distinct nationality of the Valencian people and is favoured by left-wing and Valencian nationalist parties, by some civil associations, and by some private Valencian-language publications, including books and newspapers. It is also widely used in academic publications.

The Kingdom of Valencia was the political entity governing most of the current Valencian territory between 1238 and 1707. Its name remained in local use from the 18th to the 20th centuries, largely confined to academic, cultural, and literary contexts, and was sometimes rendered as Antic Regne de València ("Old Kingdom of Valencia"). In the late 20th century, anti-Catalan blaverists proposed reviving it as the community's official name, explicitly rejecting "Valencian Country" because of its perceived association with the concept of the Catalan Countries.

The autonomous community can be eponymously identified with its capital "Valencia". However, this can be perceived as overlooking the provinces of Alicante and Castellón. Less usual translations to English include "Land of Valencia", "Region of Valencia" and "Valencian Region".

In popular culture, as an affectionate term, the Valencian Community is commonly referred to as la Terreta (Note: Pronunciation of la Terreta [la teˈreta].) ("The Little Land" in Valencian).

== History ==
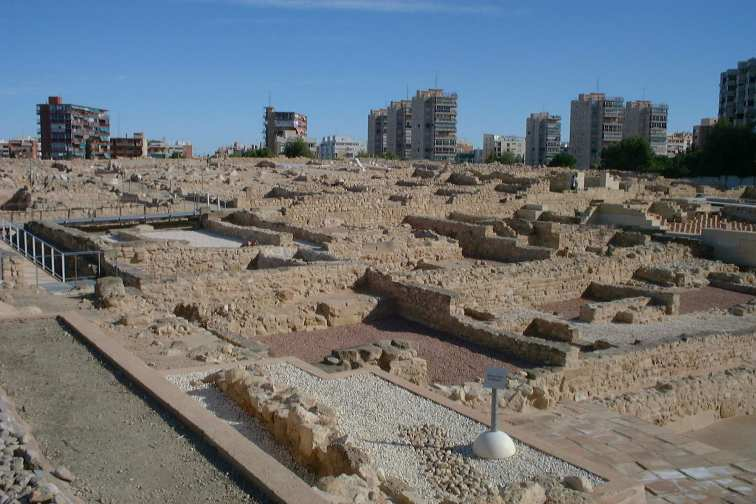
Archeological site of Tossal de Manises, ancient Iberian–Greek–Carthaginian–Roman city of Akra Leuke or Lucentum, Alicante.

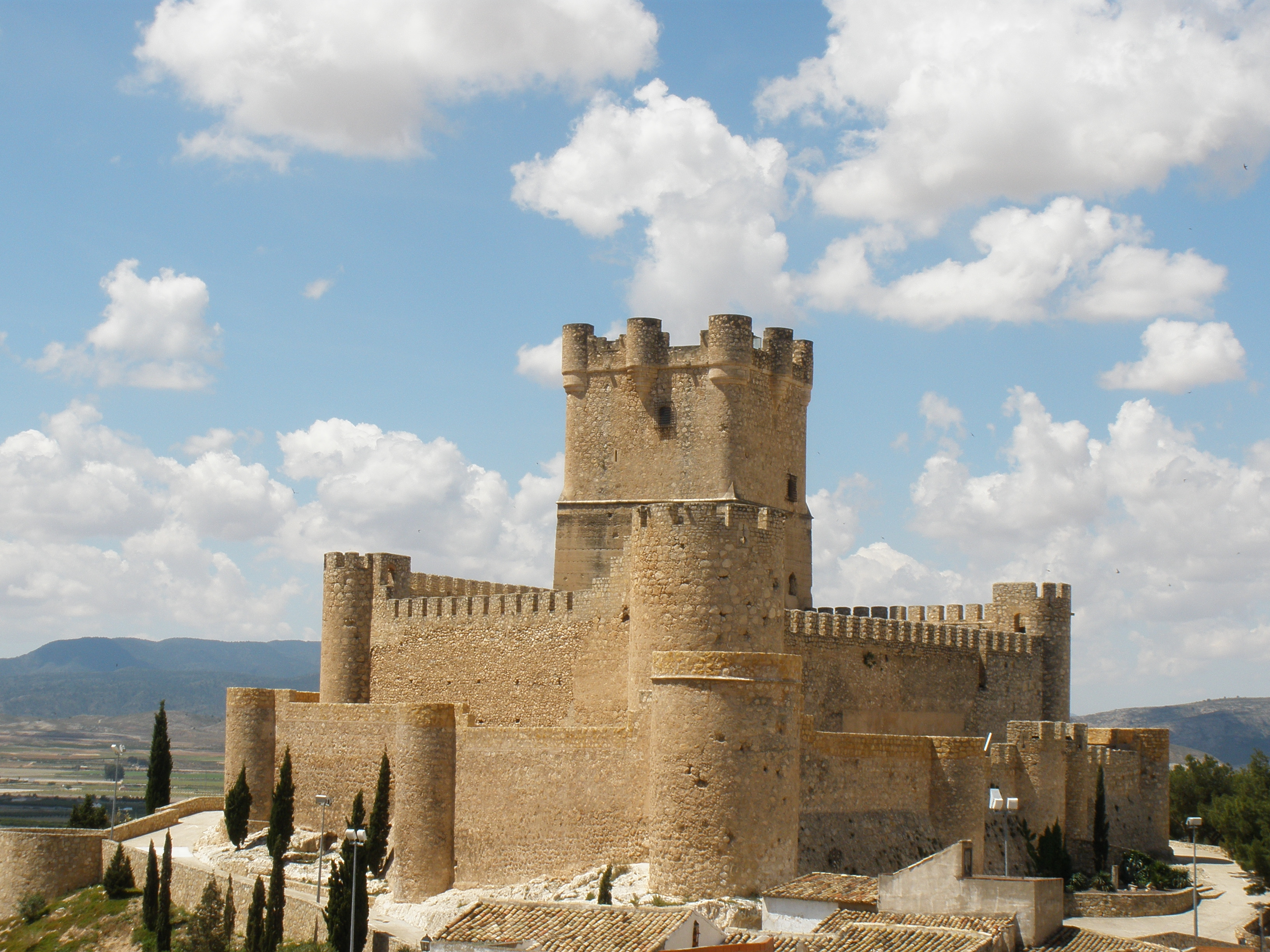
Villena castle (see Route of the Castles of Vinalopó)

The pre-Roman autochthonous people of the Valencian Community were the Iberians, who were divided in several groups (the Contestani, the Edetani, the Ilercavones and the Bastetani).

The Greeks established colonies in the coastal towns of Saguntum and Dianium beginning in the 5th century BC, where they traded and mixed with the local Iberian populations. After the end of the First Punic War between Carthage and Rome in 241 BC, which established their limits of influence in the Ebro river, the Carthaginians occupied the whole region. The dispute over the hegemony of Saguntum, a Hellenized Iberian coastal city with diplomatic contacts with Rome, destroyed by Hannibal in 219 BC, ignited the Second Punic War, which ended with the incorporation of the region to the Roman Empire.

The Romans founded the city of Valentia in 138 BC, which, over the centuries overtook Saguntum in importance. After the Fall of the Western Roman Empire, during the Barbarian Invasions in the 5th century AD, the region was first invaded by the Alans and finally ruled by the Visigoths (see Valencian Gothic), until the arrival of the Arabs in 711, which left a broad impact in the region, still visible in today's Valencian landscape and culture. After the fall of the Caliphate of Cordova, two main independent taifas were established at the region, Valencia and Dénia, along with the small and short living taifas of Orihuela, Alpuente, Jérica and Sagunt and the short Christian conquest of Valencia by El Cid.

However, the origins of present-day Valencia date back to the Kingdom of Valencia, which came into existence in the 13th century. James I of Aragon led the Christian conquest and colonization of the existing Islamic taifas with Aragonese and Catalan colonizers in 1208; they founded the Kingdom of Valencia as a third independent country within the Crown of Aragon in 1238.

The kingdom developed intensively in the 14th and 15th centuries, which are considered the Golden Age of the Valencian culture, with significant works like the chivalric romance of Tirant lo Blanch. Valencia developed into an important kingdom in Europe economically through the silk trade. It also rose to power politically with the rise of the Crown of Aragon, (within which the Kingdom of Valencia had achieved the largest population and the greatest economic power at that time) and the ascension of the Valencian House of Borja in Rome (see Route of the Borjas, Route of the Monasteries and Route of the Classics).

After a slow decline following the dynastic union of the Crown of Aragon with the Kingdom of Castile, Valencia's successful status came to a definite end with the Expulsion of the Moriscos in 1609 by the Hispanic Monarchy, which represented the loss of up to one third of the population of the Kingdom of Valencia and took the main agricultural labor force away.

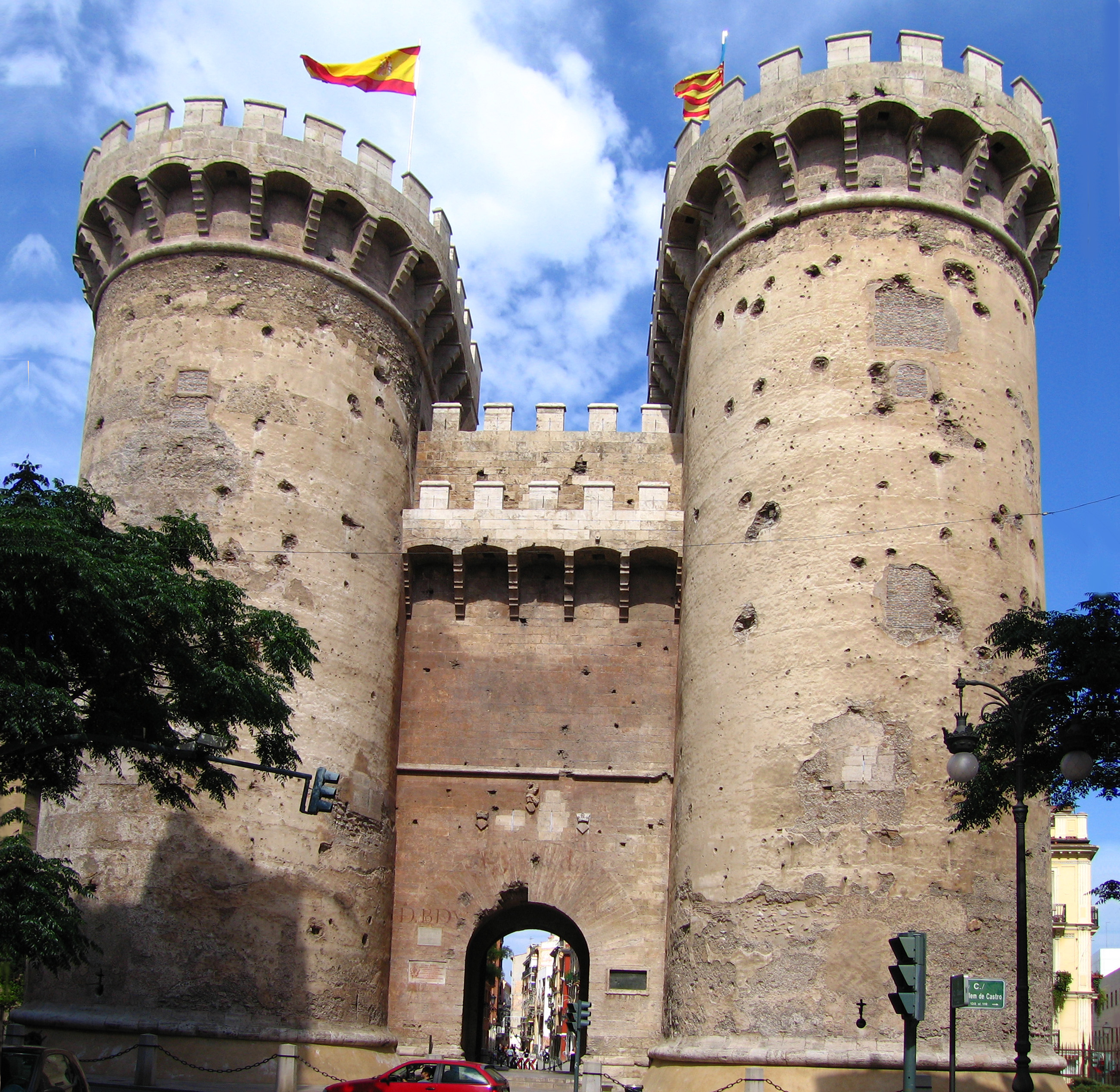
Quart Towers, city of Valencia

In 1707, in the context of the War of the Spanish Succession, and by means of the Nova Planta decrees, king Philip V of Spain abolished the Kingdom of Valencia, and the rest of the states belonging to the former Crown of Aragon and which had retained some autonomy, and subordinated it to the structure of the Kingdom of Castile and its laws and customs. As a result of this, the institutions and laws created by the Law of Valencia (Furs de València) were abolished and the usage of the Valencian language in official instances and education was forbidden. Consequently, with the House of Bourbon, a new Kingdom of Spain was formed implementing a more centralized government and absolutist regime than the former Habsburg Spain.

The first attempt to gain self-government, or autonomous government, for the Valencian Community in modern-day Spain was during the Second Spanish Republic, in 1936, but the Civil War broke out and the autonomist project was suspended. In 1977, after Franco's dictatorship Valencia started to be partially autonomous with the creation of the Council of the Valencian Country (Consell del País Valencià), and in 1982 the self-government was finally extended into a Statute of Autonomy (Estatut d'Autonomia) creating several self-government institutions under the Generalitat Valenciana. The first democratically elected President of the Generalitat Valenciana, Joan Lerma, took office in 1982 as part of the transition to autonomy.

The Valencian Statute of Autonomy make clear that Valencia is intended to be the modern conception of self-government of the Valencian Community from the first autonomist movements during the Second Spanish Republic, but also joining it to the traditional conception of Valencian identity, as being the successor to the historical Kingdom of Valencia. In fact, after a bipartisan reform of the Valencian Statute of Autonomy in 2006, it records the foral civil law, using the traditional conception of a kingdom, and, on the other hand, it also recognizes Valencia as a nationality, in accordance with the modern conception.

The central part of the community was severely affected by the 2024 Spanish floods.

== Geography ==
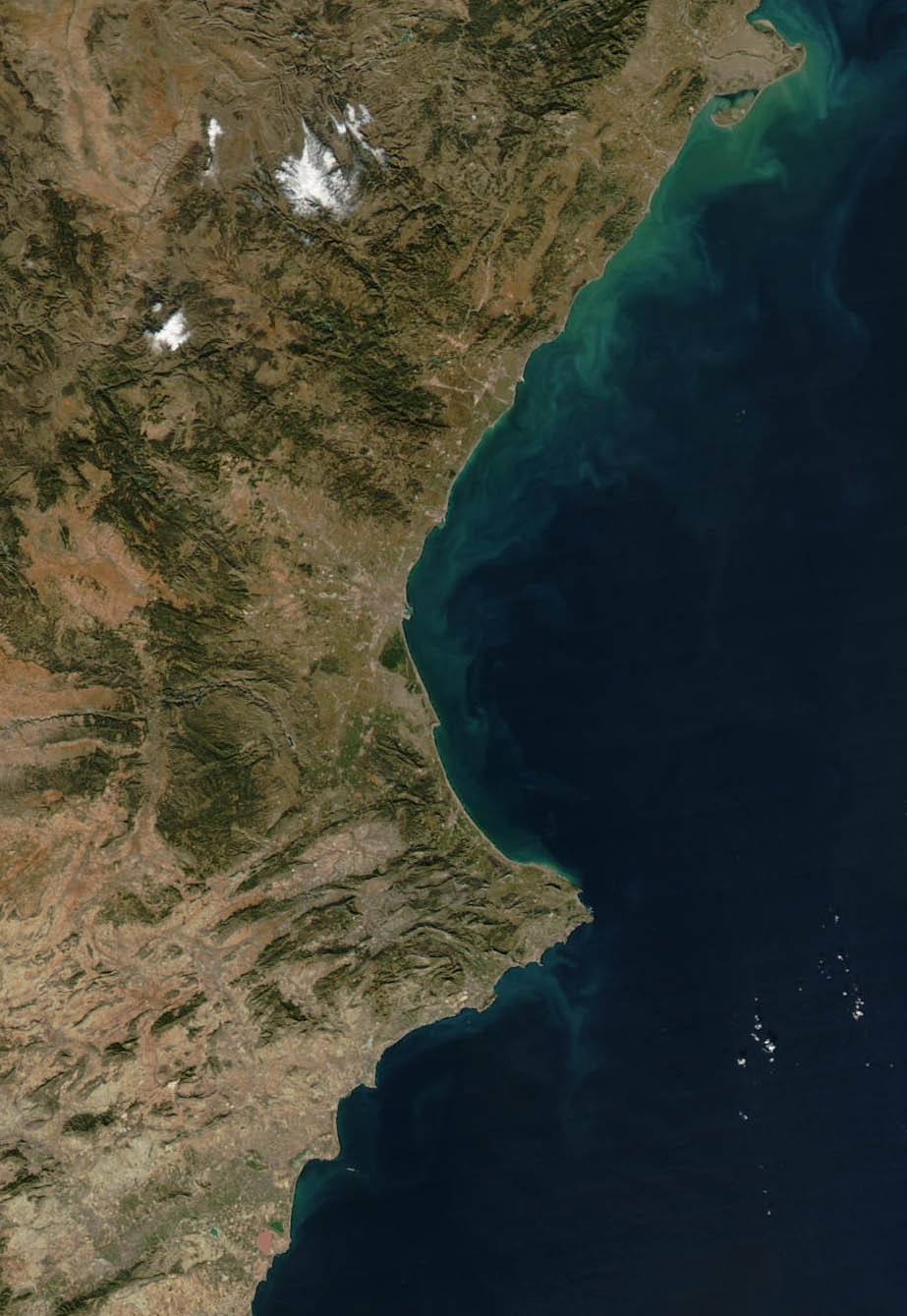
Satellite image of the Valencian Community

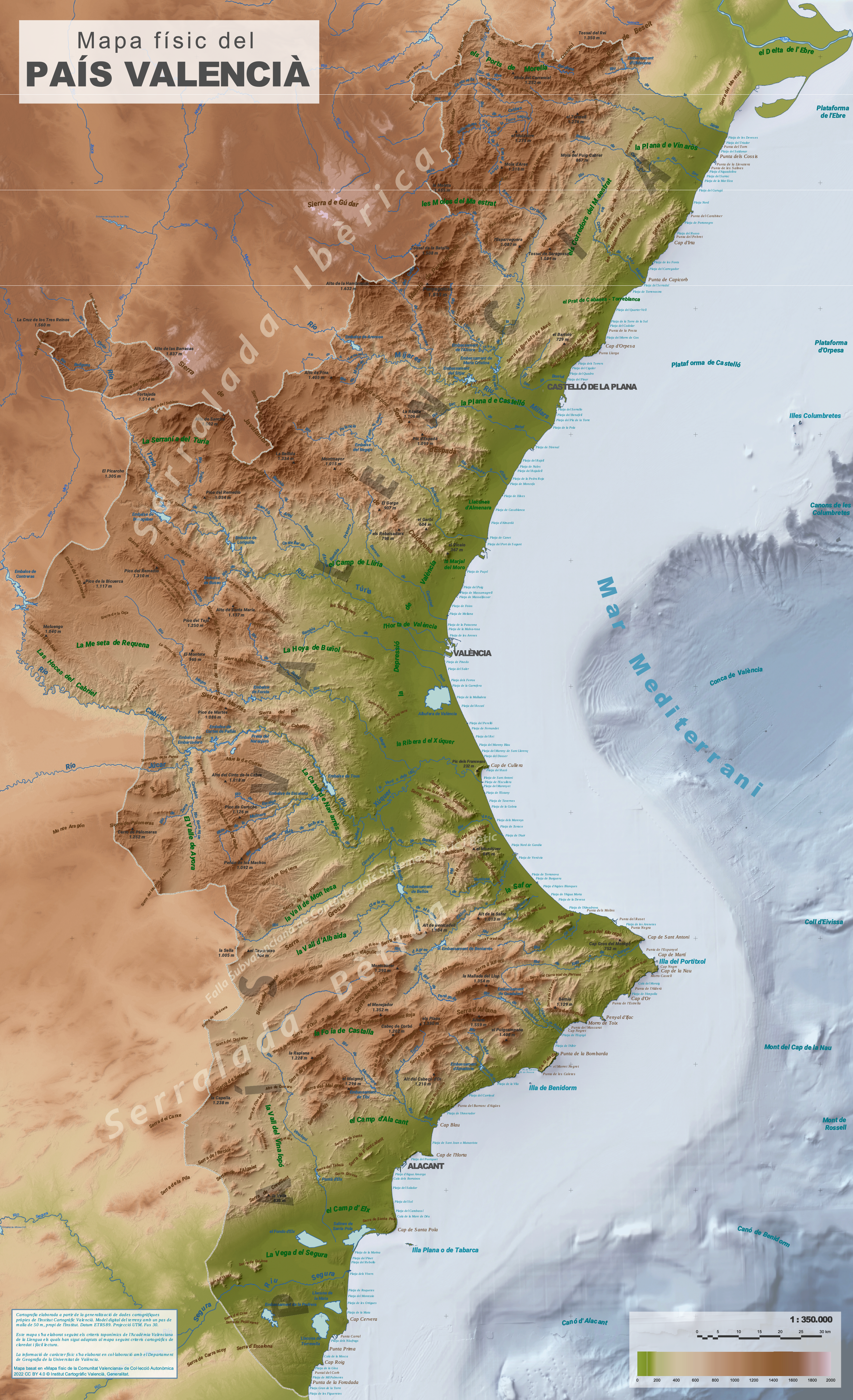
Relief map of the Community

The inland part of the territory is craggy, with some of the highest peaks in the Valencia and Castellón provinces forming part of the Iberian Mountain Range. The mountains in the Province of Alicante are in turn a part of the Subbaetic Range.

The most emblematic mountain of the Valencian Community is the Penyagolosa, in the Alcalatén area. It is widely thought to be the highest peak with 1,813 m, but actually the highest peak is the Calderón (1,839 m) located in the Rincón de Ademuz, a Valencian exclave between Aragon and Castilla–La Mancha. The most emblematic mountain in the southern part of the territory is the Aitana (1,558 m).

The thin coastal strip is a very fertile plain without mountains except those around the Cap de la Nau area in northern Alicante province and the Peñíscola area in the Castellón province. Typical of this coastal area are wetlands and marshlands such as L'Albufera close to Valencia, El Fondo in Elche and Crevillent, La Marjal near Pego, L'Albufera de Gaianes in Gaianes or El Prat in Cabanes, also the former wetlands and salt evaporation ponds in the Santa Pola and Torrevieja area. All of them are key Ramsar sites which make Valencia of high relevance for both migratory and resident seabirds and waterbirds.

There are many important coastal dunes in the Saler area near the Albufera and in the Guardamar area, both of them were planted with thousands of trees during the 19th century in order to fix the dunes, thus forming now protected areas of remarkable ecologic value.

In addition to mainland Valencia, the Valencian territory administers the tiny Columbretes Islands and the coastal inhabited islet of Tabarca.

=== Climate ===
Valencia has a generally pleasant climate, with mild winters and hot summers, heavily influenced by the neighbouring Mediterranean sea. Still, there are important differences between areas:

- Typical Mediterranean climate (Köppen Csa). It roughly goes along the coastal plain from the northernmost border through the Benidorm area (cities included here are, amongst others, Castellón de la Plana, Gandia and Valencia). It covers in various grades the lower inland areas. In this area, winters are mild, summers are long, dry and hot; rainfall occurs mostly during spring and autumn, usually totalling around 600 mm. with a remarkably wetter micro climate in the Marina Alta and the Safor comarques just north of Cap de la Nau cape, which accumulates an average of up to 1000 mm. due to an orographic lift phenomenon.
- Mediterranean climate with continental influences (Köppen Csa) and Mediterranean highland climate (Köppen Csb). These are the innermost lands and those at a higher elevation (cities included here are, amongst others, Alcoy, Morella, Requena and Villena). Here winters are cool to cold, especially at night (a few days of snow are not unusual), summers mild to hot and rainfall more evenly distributed through the year. The lower registered temperatures in the Valencian Community were in these inland areas during the cold wave of 1956. Temperatures plunged to nearly −20 °C; as in Vistabella del Maestrat (−19 °C) and Castellfort (–17 °C).
- Hot semi-arid climate (Köppen BSh), although in higher altitude zones at the interior the average temperatures are lower, being BSk in the Köppen climate classification. It roughly goes along the coastal plain from Villajoyosa through the southernmost border of the territory (cities included here are, amongst others, Alicante, Benidorm, Elche, Orihuela and Torrevieja). Summers are hot and dry, winters are mild and its most prominent feature is a very scarce precipitation, typically below 300 mm. per year which is most likely to happen during spring and autumn. The reason for this lack of precipitation is the marked rain shadow effect caused by hills to the west of the Alicante province (and, to a lesser degree, those in the northern part of the province which, in turn, enhance the inverse orographic lift effect around Cap de la Nau).

The warm-summer Mediterranean climate (Köppen Csb), humid subtropical climate (Köppen Cfa), oceanic climate (Köppen Cfb) and the desertic climate (Köppen BWh) are also found in the Valencian Community. The Csb climate is more common and is found in inland, high altitude areas (generally starting above 1,000 metres (3,300 ft)) across the 3 provinces of the Valencian Community, especially in the interior of Castellón but also in El Rincón de Ademuz and the north of Los Serranos comarcas in the province of Valencia. In the province of Alicante this climate is only found in the highest altitudes of Serra de Mariola and Sierra de Aitana. Both Cfa and Cfb climates can be only found in the interior of the province of Castellón, with marginal presence in the Valencian province, only in the Rincón de Ademuz comarca. The presence of the desertic climates (BWh) is marginal to scarcely populated areas south of Elche.

=== Hydrography ===
There are only two major rivers: the Segura in the province of Alicante, whose source is in Andalusia, and the Júcar (or Xúquer) in the province of Valencia, whose source is in Castilla–La Mancha. Both are subjected to very intense human regulation for cities, industries and, especially, agricultural consumption. The river Turia (or Túria) is the third largest and has its source in Aragon. Most rivers in the area, such as the Vinalopó, are usually short, have little current (due to agricultural usage, climatic reasons or both) and are often completely dry during the summer. Other Valencian rivers are the Serpis and Sénia.

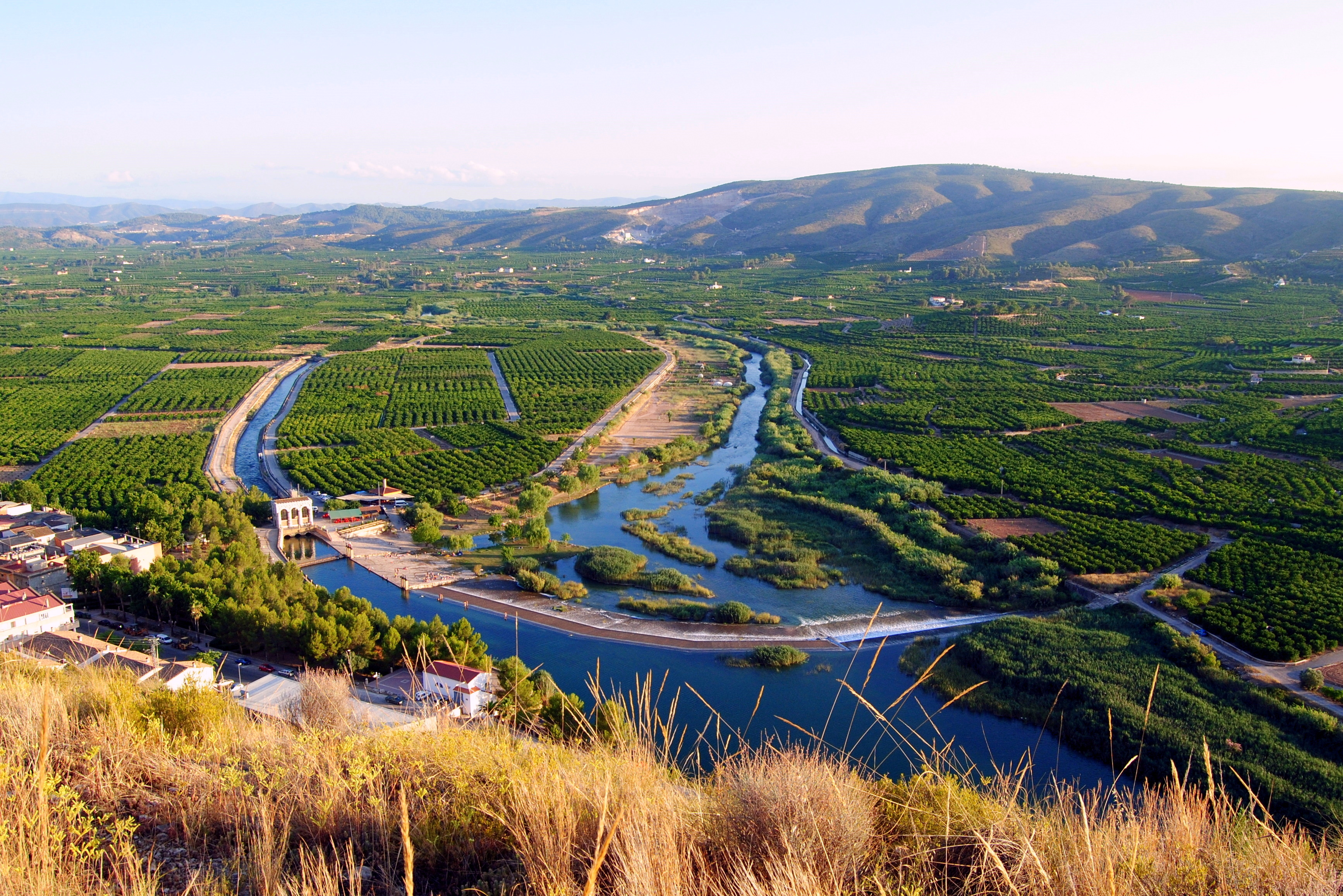
Xúquer river with irrigated orange orchards near Antella

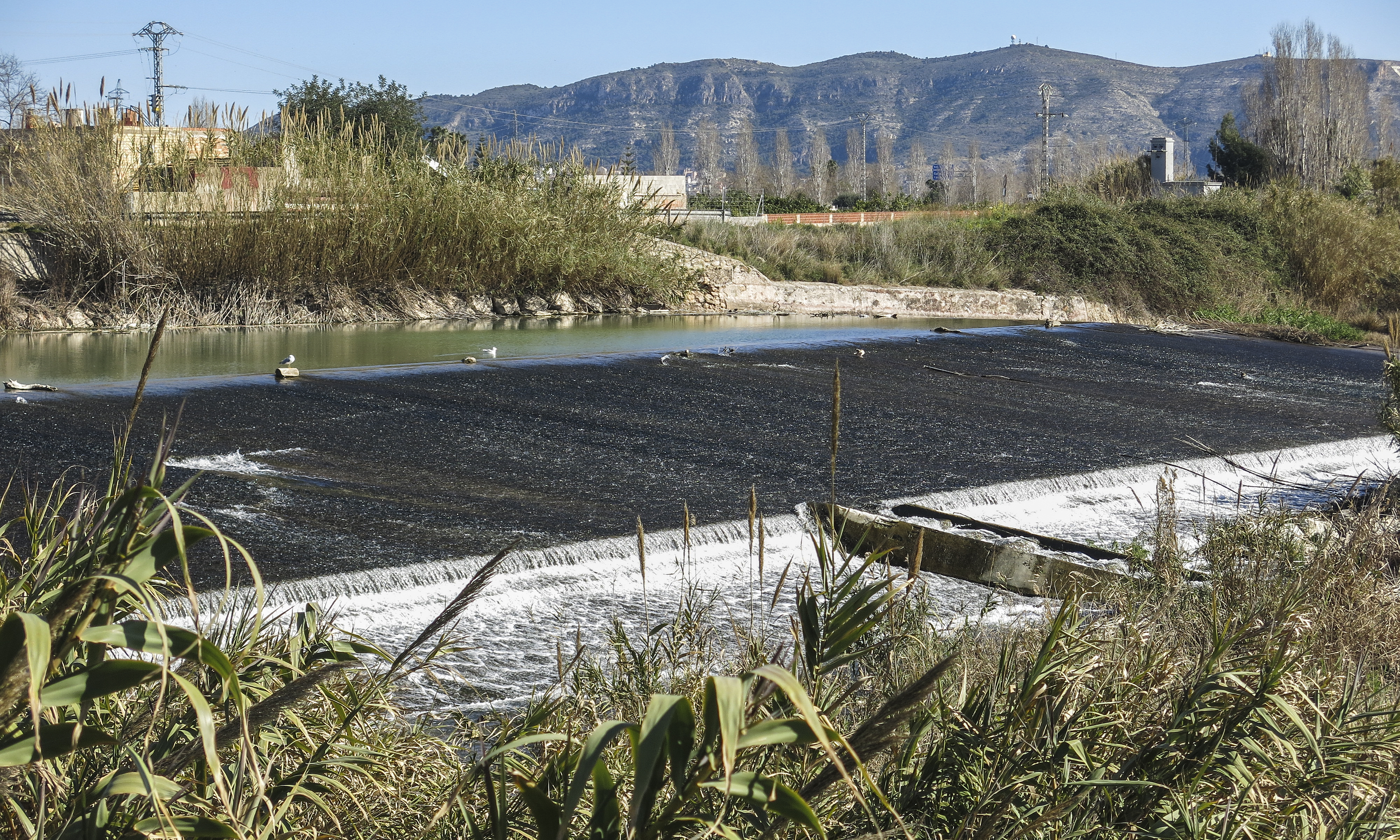
Cullera weir of the Xúquer river, between Sueca and Fortaleny

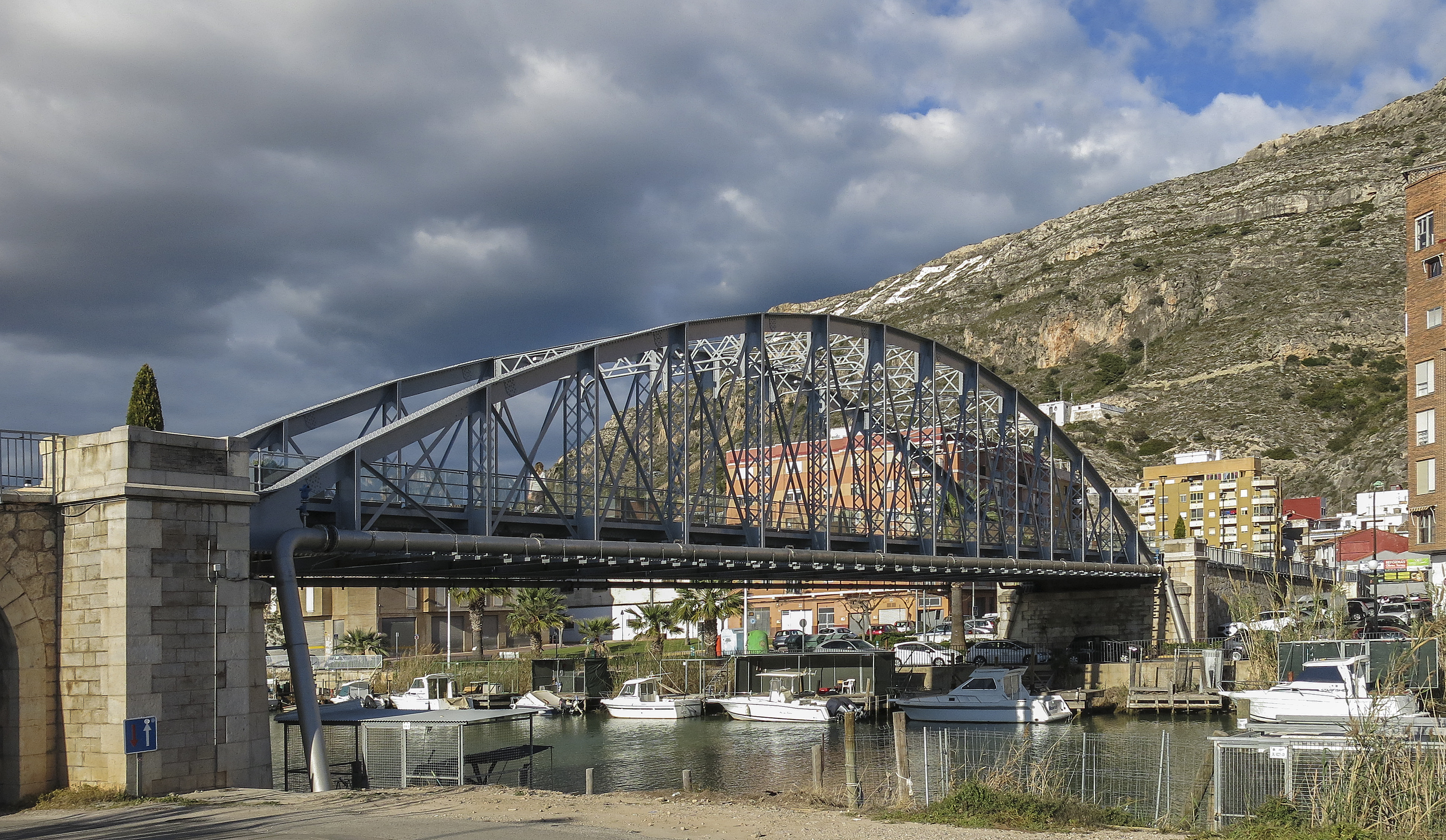
Bridge over the Xúquer river

== Demographics ==
Historical population
Year	Pop.	±%
1842	977,060	—
1857	1,246,006	+27.5%
1877	1,381,255	+10.9%
1887	1,460,238	+5.7%
1900	1,599,530	+9.5%
1910	1,733,282	+8.4%
1920	1,785,227	+3.0%
1930	1,914,546	+7.2%
1940	2,197,765	+14.8%
1950	2,309,254	+5.1%
1960	2,498,905	+8.2%
1970	3,078,095	+23.2%
1981	3,646,778	+18.5%
1991	3,857,234	+5.8%
2001	4,162,776	+7.9%
2011	5,009,931	+20.4%
2021	5,067,911	+1.2%
Source: INE

The Valencian Community is, with a population of 5,425,182 as of 2025, the 4th most populous autonomous community in Spain, and represents 11.0% of the national population. 49.2% are males, and 50.8% are females. Minors make up 16.5% of the population, and seniors make up 20.4%.

Its population is very unevenly distributed: it is concentrated on the coastal strip and has an average population density of 233.2 inhabitants/km². The community has shown strong demographic growth from the 1960s until 2023, when it reaches its maximum; 19.5% of its population is of foreign nationality as of 2025. Despite the high population rate, there are 21 municipalities, most of them in the province of Castellón, that have less than 100 inhabitants. Castell de Cabres with 21 inhabitants is the least populous municipality in the Valencian Community.

=== Evolution ===
The study of the demographic evolution of the Valencian Community can be divided into two clearly differentiated periods, which belong to two different moments of the demographic transition: the old demographic cycle or regime (until the 18th century), characterized by high mortality and high birth rates, and the modern demographic regime or cycle (from the end of the 18th century and beginning of the 19th), in which the drop in mortality initially caused a demographic transition, with strong increases in the population, which passed in its final moments of demographic stability thanks to the drop in birth rates. In the case of the Valencian Community, and in Spain as a whole, both cycles temporarily coincided with the non-presence of reliable population censuses, which would not allow a precise study of demographic states and processes.

=== Urbanization ===
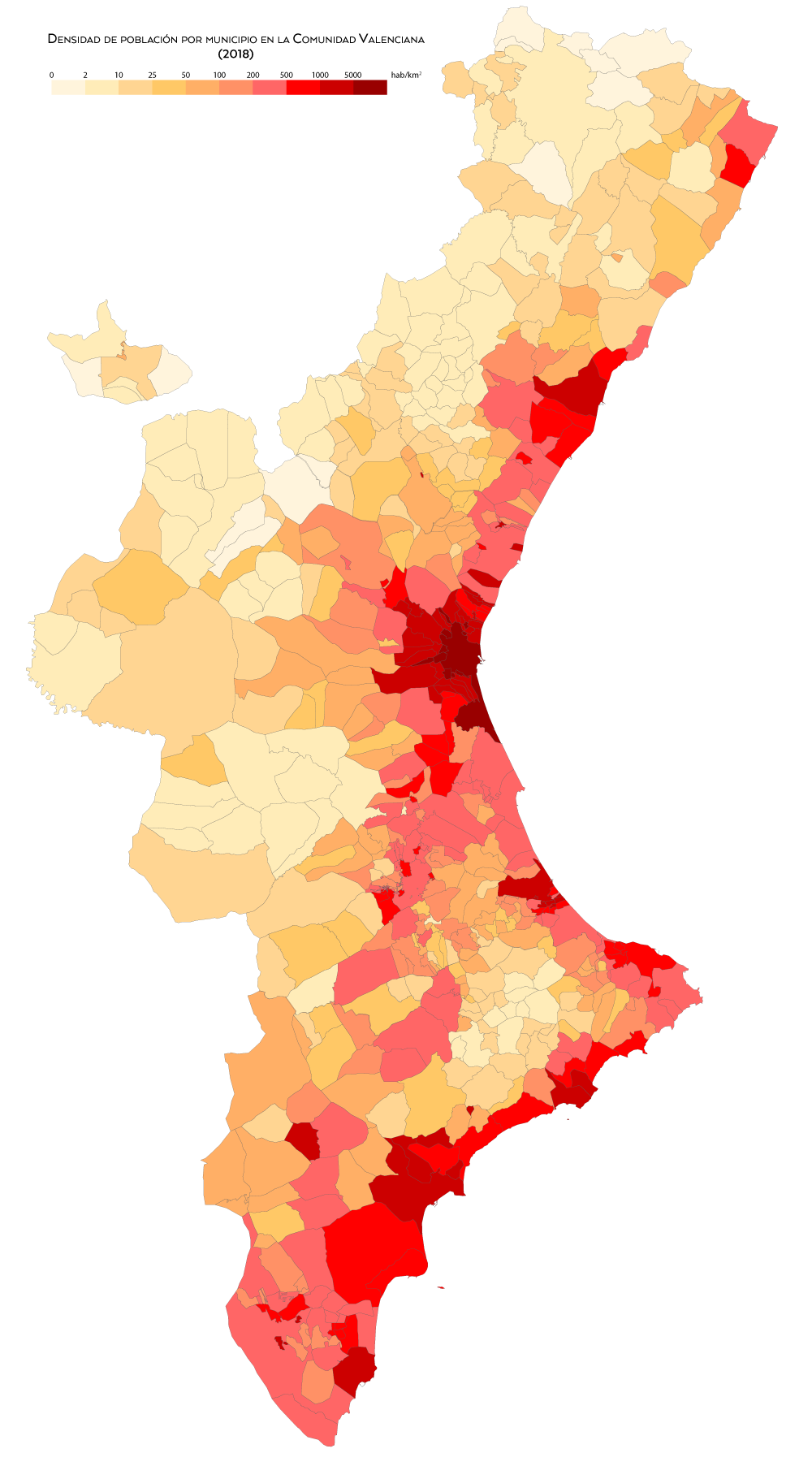
Areas in red mark higher population density in the central and southern regions.

Valencian population traditionally concentrated in localities with fertile cultivation and growing lowlands by the most important rivers (Júcar or Xúquer, Turia or Túria, Segura, and Vinalopó), also in harbour cities important to the agricultural trade. In actuality, population is particularly dense along the coast as well as in central and southern regions of the territory, and more sparse around the inner and northern regions. Important historical cities include Sagunt and Dénia in Roman times; Valencia, Alacant, Xàtiva, Orihuela, Elx, Gandia, and Villarreal or Vila-real later on in history and, more recently, Alzira and Castelló de la Plana. Another set of noncoastal cities increased significantly in numbers due to industrialization in the 20th century, including Alcoy or Alcoi, Elda, Ontinyent, Petrer, Villena, and La Vall d'Uixó.

In recent decades, the concentration of population around the large capitals has increased and large metropolitan areas have been formed, although the demographic concentration has also occurred in coastal towns and cities, so that traditionally small populations, such as Benidorm, Gandia, Calp or Torrevieja have experienced a very considerable population increase, even greater during the summer season, mainly due to the seasonal migrations of the tourism industry workforce.

Largest municipalities in the Valencian Community INE – 2025
Rank		Comarca	Pop.	Rank		Comarca	Pop.
1	Valencia	Valencia	841,558	11	Sagunto	Camp de Morvedre	73,416
2	Alicante	Alacantí	365,586	12	Alcoy	Alcoià	61,613
3	Elche	Baix Vinalopó	245,575	13	San Vicente del Raspeig	Alacantí	60,428
4	Castellón de la Plana	Plana Alta	183,709	14	Elda	Vinalopó Mitjà	55,554
5	Torrevieja	Vega Baja del Segura	100,470	15	Villarreal	Plana Baixa	53,634
6	Torrent	Horta Oest	91,353	16	Alzira	Ribera Alta	48,604
7	Orihuela	Vega Baja del Segura	84,279	17	Dénia	Marina Alta	47,568
8	Gandia	Safor	82,909	18	Mislata	Horta Oest	47,003
9	Benidorm	Marina Baixa	77,211	19	Burjassot	Horta Nord	41,743
10	Paterna	Horta Oest	75,805	20	Santa Pola	Baix Vinalopó	39,622

==== Metropolitan areas ====
The main metropolitan areas of the Valencian Community according to their population are three, plus a fourth one shared with the Region of Murcia. The most populous one is the metropolitan area of Valencia, which is located in the central area of the Gulf of Valencia, around the Valencian Community's capital. It is the third largest in Spain, with 1,774,201 inhabitants (INE 2011).

The metropolitan area of Alicante-Elche has 757,085 inhabitants (INE 2014) and is the eighth metropolitan area in Spain by population; it is the sum of the urban areas of Alicante (468,581 inhabitants) and Elche-Crevillent (288,504 inhabitants), therefore a bipolar metropolitan area.

The metropolitan area of Castellón de la Plana is made up of the municipalities of Castellón de la Plana, Almassora, Villarreal, Benicàssim, Borriol and Burriana or Borriana, and has 309,420 inhabitants (INE 2008) and an area of 340 km²; Castellón de la Plana is the main centre and most populous municipality of this metropolitan area.

The Murcia-Orihuela metropolitan area includes the urban area of Orihuela in the Valencian Community, plus the metropolitan agglomerations of Murcia, Molina de Segura and Alcantarilla, in the neighboring Region of Murcia. This supraregional metropolitan area has a total population of 776,784 inhabitants (INE 2009), an area of 1,787 km² and a density of 445.54 inhabitants/km², making it the seventh largest in Spain.

In recent decades the concentration of the population in the provincial capitals and in their metropolitan areas has increased considerably, in cities such as Torrent, Mislata, Paterna, Burjassot, or San Vicente del Raspeig.

According to the INE, the largest metropolitan areas are:

Rank	Metropolitan Area	Province	Population
1	Valencia	Valencia	1,774,201
2	Alicante–Elche	Alicante	757,085
3	Castellón de la Plana	Castellón	386,906
4	Alzira–Xàtiva	Valencia	348,582
5	Benidorm–Villajoyosa	Alicante	183,253

=== Immigration ===
Foreign population by country of birth (2025)
Country	Population
Colombia	164,508
Morocco	123,418
Romania	86,318
United Kingdom	79,565
Venezuela	75,661
Argentina	71,083
Ukraine	61,688
Ecuador	51,608
France	45,959
Russia	41,394
Algeria	38,776
Cuba	26,788
Germany	26,185
China	25,927
Bulgaria	22,414

As of 2025, immigrants make up 24.1% of the population. The 5 largest foreign countries of birth are Colombia, Morocco, Romania, United Kingdom, and Venezuela.

== Government ==
=== Institutions of government: La Generalitat ===
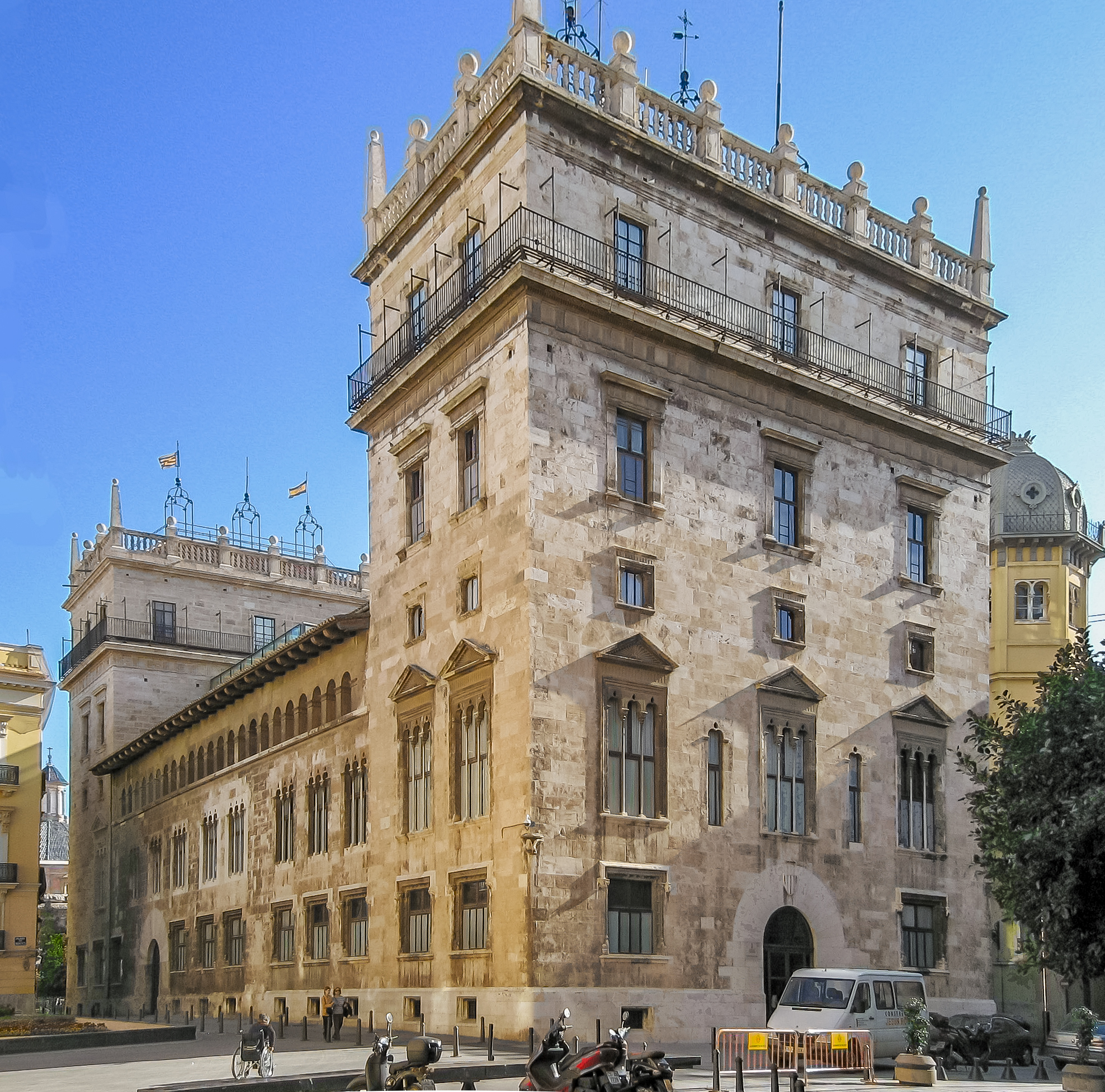
Palau de la Generalitat Valenciana, seat of the Valencian government

In the process whereby democracy was restored in Spain between 1975 and 1978, the nationalist and regionalist parties pressed to grant home rule to certain territories in Spain. The constitution of 1978 opened a legal way for autonomous communities to be formed from provinces with common historical and cultural links. In recognition of the Valencian Community as a nationality of Spain, and in accordance to the second article of the Spanish Constitution which grants autonomy to the "nationalities and regions" that compose the Spanish nation, Valencia was granted self-government and constituted itself as an autonomous community in 1982, with the promulgation of its first Statute of Autonomy, the basic organic law, later approved by the Cortes Generales of Spain.

All autonomous communities were organized politically within a parliamentary system; that is, the executive branch of government. The "President" is dependent on the direct support of the legislative power, whose members elect him by majority.

A new Statute of Autonomy was promulgated in 2006. The government of Valencia is represented by the Generalitat Valenciana (statutorily referred to simply as La Generalitat) constituted by three institutions:

- the Corts Valencianes (Valencian parliament), the legislature, which is to be integrated by a minimum of ninety-two representatives (diputats) elected through universal suffrage by proportional representation for a four-year period;
- the President of the Generalitat Valenciana must obtain the vote of confidence from the Corts; the current President is Juanfran Pérez Llorca (from the People's Party of the Valencian Community).
- the Council of the Generalitat Valenciana (Valencian government), a collegiate institution with executive powers, integrated by the President him/herself and the cabinet members appointed by him/her.

The Generalitat can also be integrated by the institutions that the Valencian Corts create. The Corts have approved the creation of the Síndic de Greuges (Ombudsman), the Sindicatura de Comptes (Public Audit Office), the Consell Valencià de Cultura (Valencian Council of Culture), the Acadèmia Valenciana de la Llengua (Valencian Academy of the Language), the Consell Jurídic Consultiu (Juridic and Consultative Council) and the Comité Econòmic i Social (Social and Economic Committee).

=== Administrative divisions ===
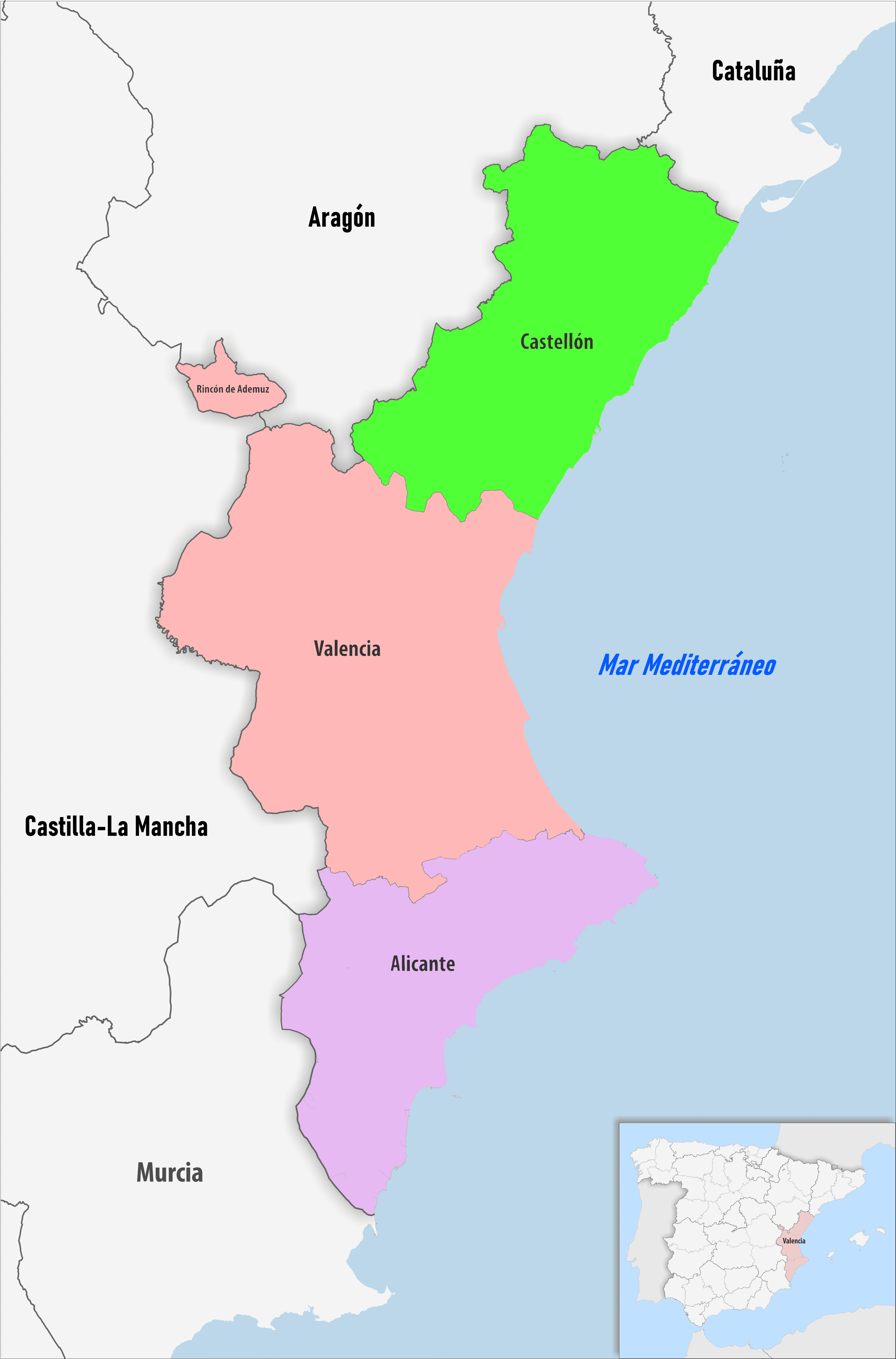
Map of the provinces of the Valencian Community

Prior to the 1833 territorial division of Spain Valencia was divided into four administrative provinces of Spain: Alicante, Castellón, Valencia and Xàtiva.

From 1833, the current three-province system was consolidated:

Province	Capital	Population (2025)	Area (km²)	Density (inh./km²)	Municipalities
Alicante	Alicante	2,033,566	5,818.30	349.5	141
Castellón	Castellón de la Plana	627,620	6,633.98	94.6	135
Valencia	Valencia	2,763,996	10,812.94	255.6	266

The Valencian Community is further divided into 34 comarques (including the city of Valencia) and 542 municipalities (141 in the Province of Alicante, 135 in the Province of Castellón, and 266 in the Province of Valencia).

== Culture ==
=== Gastronomy ===
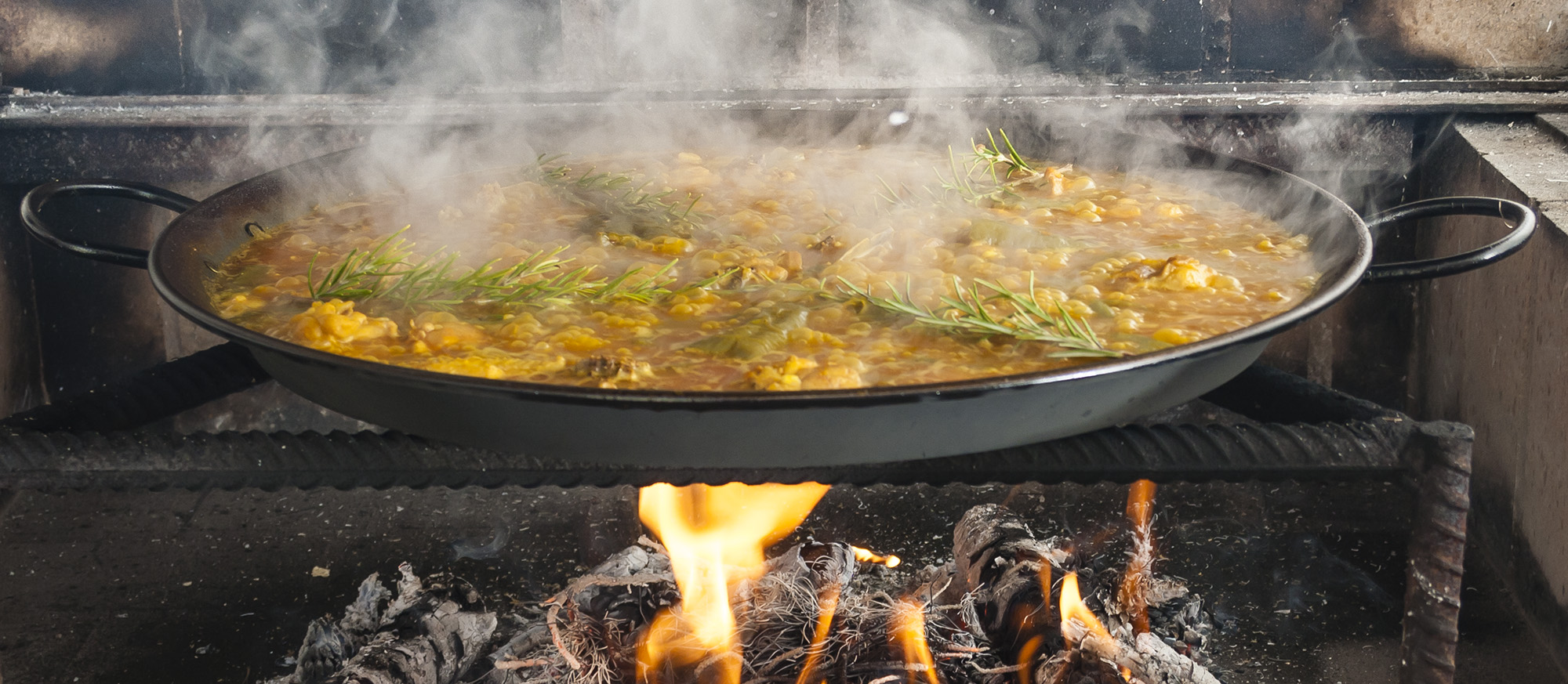
Valencian paella

The Valencian gastronomy is of great variety, although their more international dishes are rice-based (arròs in Valencian), like the Valencian paella known worldwide. Rice is a basic ingredient in many of the typical dishes, like the arròs a banda, arròs al forn, arròs amb costra, arròs caldós, arròs del senyoret, arròs negre, among many.

Pasta dishes include the fideuà. Its main ingredients are pasta noodles, fish and shellfish.

The Valencian Mediterranean climate favors the cultivation of vegetables and citrus fruits, with the cultivation of the orange (Valencian: taronja) being perhaps of highest importance as one of the typical fruits of Valencian agriculture.

Horchata (orxata in Valencian), production of which has traditionally been centred around Alboraya (Alboraia), is a typical drink, accompanied with fartons. Also traditional are the production of coffee liqueur (typical of Alcoy), and mistela (in Marina Baixa and Hoya de Buñol (Foia de Bunyol)). Another one is agua de Valencia, in Valencian aigua de València, it is a cocktail made from a base of cava or champagne, orange juice, vodka, and gin. In general, it is served in pitchers of various sizes and is drunk in a broad cocktail glass. It was made for the first time in 1959 by Constante Gil in the bar Café Madrid, in the city of Valencia.

The great majority of desserts typical of Valencia have their origin in Arabic times and play an important part in the local festive activities. Some are internationally famous. Xixona is the place of traditional manufacture of turrón (torró in Valencian), a soft nougat, consumed during Christmas in Spain and the rest of the Hispanic world. In Casinos the turrón is typical too but the most important manufacture of the village is peladillas or confit (dragées and sugared almonds). In Xàtiva and the Central comarques, the arnadí, a dessert elaborated with pumpkin is made. Orihuela and its region have the almojábanas.

=== Valencian symbols ===
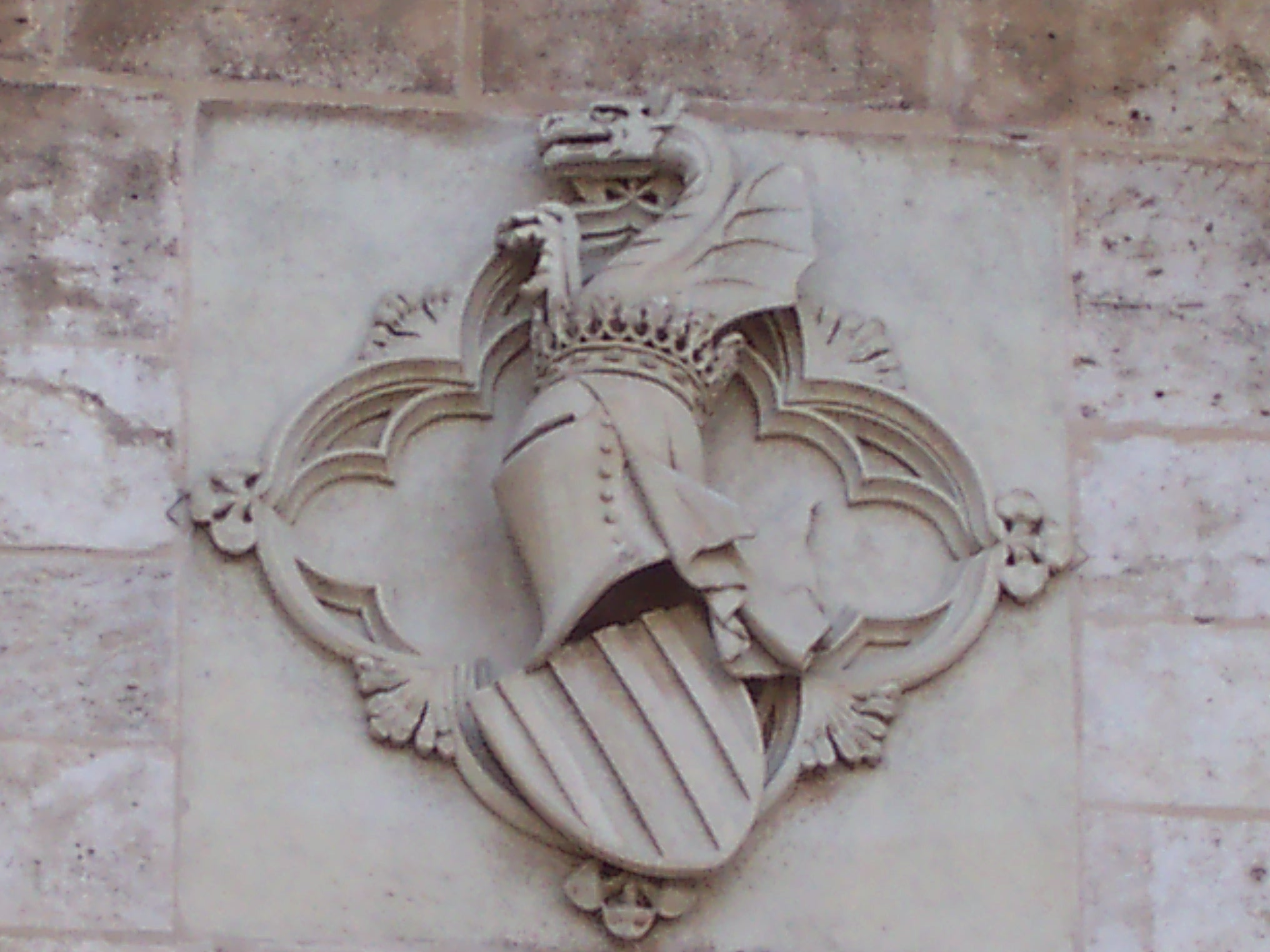
Valencian coat of arms over the entrance of Serranos Towers

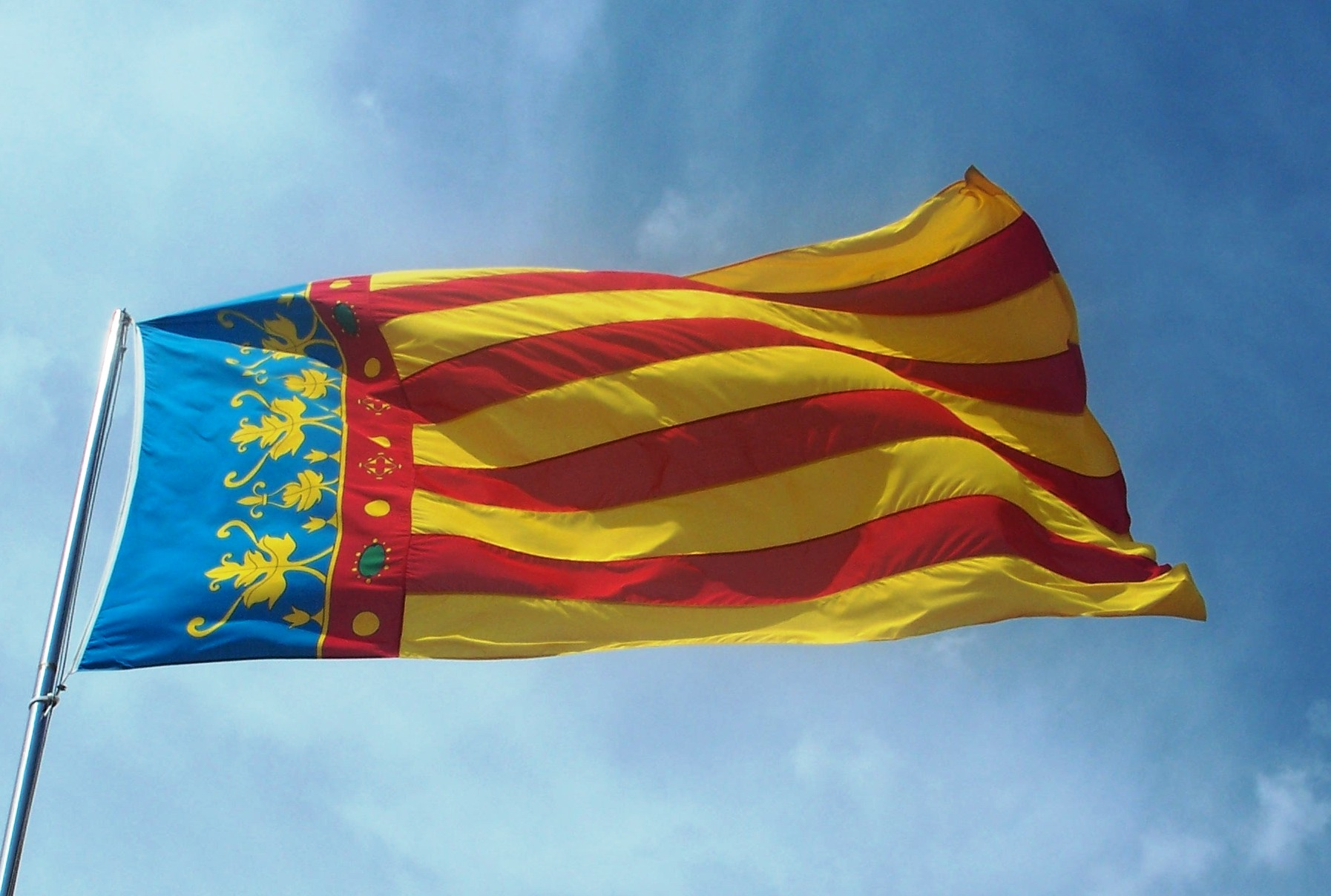
Reial Senyera, Valencian flag

The official Valencian anthem is the Hymn of the Regional Exhibition of 1909 (Himne de l'Exposició Regional de 1909 in Valencian; commonly known as the Himne de València, "Anthem of Valencia"), in whose composition the old hymn of the City of Valencia of the 16th century is included. The emblem of the Valencian Generalitat (coat of arms) includes the heraldry of King Peter IV of Aragon, representative of the historical Kingdom of Valencia, whose shield is inclined towards the right, or, four bars Gules.

The official flag, the Royal Senyera (Reial Senyera), also known as Senyera Coronada (Crowned Senyera) or Senyera Tricolor (Tricolour Senyera) is the same as Valencia's City flag, which, in turn, is a historical derivation of the Senyera, the heraldic symbol of the Crown of Aragon, also used today with few variations in all the former Kingdoms and Counties which were a part of this crown. There are also a number of Valencian private and civil entities such as trade unions, cultural associations, or political parties which simply use the Senyera as Valencian flag.

Other symbols are used at different levels by the Valencian society, like the heraldic animals of rat-penat (a bat) and drac alat (a winged dragon which was the emblem of James I).

One of the most recognized and representative Valencian symbols are the music and dance of the Muixeranga, ancient tradition of human towers preserved for the last 4 centuries, during the Festivity of La Mare de Déu de la Salut Festival of Algemesí, recognized-UNESCO "intangible heritage of humanity". Typical folk music in celebrations is played with the tabalet (a drum) and the dolçaina (a flute). Valencian traditional costumes and dresses include espardenyes (shoes) and traditional fallera dresses (the Falles dresses).

=== Celebrations ===
- Falles of Valencia – 15–19 March
- Fogueres de Sant Joan of Alicante – 19–24 June
- Misteri of Elche – 14 and 15 August
- Muixeranga: Algemesí – 7 and 8 September
- Moros i Cristians: Alcoy – 22–24 April
- Tomatina of Buñol – last Wednesday in August
- Magdalena of Castellón – third Saturday of Lent

==== Valencian Community Day ====
- 9 October: (9 d'Octubre or 9 de Octubre) Official day of the Valencian Community and public holiday in the entire autonomous community. This day commemorates the entrance of James I to the city of Valencia on the year 1238.

==== Fallas ====
- Fallas (Falles in Valencian) is a traditional festival celebrated in Valencia, Spain, held annually from March 15 to March 19 in honor of Saint Joseph, the patron saint of carpenters. The festival is known for its elaborate sculptures, vibrant street parties, music, and fireworks.

=== Language ===
Spanish (español or castellano) has official status in all of Spain, including the Valencian Community. Aside from it Valencian (valencià) is also official, the Statute of Autonomy recognizes as the language native (llengua pròpia) to the Valencian people and commends its protection and regulation to the Acadèmia Valenciana de la Llengua (AVL) under the Generalitat Valenciana.

Valencian is the historical, traditional and official name of the native language of the Valencian Community. Valencians use Valencian to refer to the Romance language also known as Catalan language. In the Late Middle Ages, due to Valencia becoming its own kingdom, the term Valencian became the most common name there, over the term Catalan used in other territories.

Valencian was marginalized during Franco's dictatorship (1939–1975) in favor of Spanish. Since it regained official status in 1982 in the Valencian Statute of Autonomy, Valencian has been implemented in public administration and the education system, leading to a dramatic increase in knowledge of its formal standard. According to the general survey from 2015, Valencian is understood by almost the entire population living within the Valencian Community and is spoken by a wide majority, but almost half of the population cannot write it.

Modern Valencian shares similar phonetic and lexical features with the Western Catalan dialects, which includes seven stressed vowels (being especially remarkable the distinction of /ɛ/ vs /e/ and /ɔ/ vs /o/), unstressed vowel reduction (normally five) and vowel harmony; the preservation of yod (/j/) before /ʃ/ in the digraph ix; the addition of n in the plural of certain terms with etymological n; and a tendency to affrication of g (before e and i) and j /dʒ/, and x /tʃ/, especially in initial position. Common specific lexicon includes: granera (broom), xiquet (boy), espill (mirror), corder (lamb), etc.

Valencian Sign Language is widely used by Valencian deaf persons and is also granted protection under the Statute.

The Spanish spoken in the cities is little affected by Valencian and features distinción, i.e. the differentiation of /s/ (s) and /θ/ (c before e and i, and z), and yeísmo (the merger of /ʎ/–ll in Spanish orthography–into /ʝ/, represented as y). In the south of the Valencian Community, dialects similar to neighbouring Murcian Spanish are spoken, featuring both distinción and seseo (the merger of /θ/ into /s/), depending on the speaker and area. In the east, traits in common with the Spanish of either Aragon or La Mancha are found in the local Spanish.

==== Areas of linguistic predominance ====
The traditionally Valencian-speaking territories are marked in green

Not all of the Valencian territory is historically Valencian-speaking; about 1 million people, or 20% of the population, live in inland or southern areas that are traditionally Spanish-speaking. This area comprises around 35–40% of the extension of the Valencian Community. These regions include the areas where Aragonese rather than Catalan settlers introduced the Castilian-Aragonese language in the historic Kingdom of Valencia, as well as several Castilian municipalities that were annexed to the Valencian Community in the 19th century. Valencian is traditionally spoken in the more densely populated coastal areas where Catalan settlers introduced their language in the Middle Ages. These areas are delimited for administrative purposes by the Generalitat, establishing different areas of linguistic predominance (Valencian: predomini lingüístic, Spanish: predominio lingüístico). The area of Valencian linguistic predominance is undergoing in many cases a process of linguistic substitution, especially in the two largest cities of the community, Valencia and Alicante, where Spanish has become predominant in spite of Valencian being the traditional language. In addition, large numbers of foreign immigrants who have arrived since 2000 have become Spanish speakers. Outside the aforementioned cities, and the traditional Spanish-speaking areas in the west, Valencian predominates or is on an equal footing in the rest of the territory.

==== Knowledge ====
Knowledge of Valencian
	1986	1991	2001	2011
Can understand	77.12%	83.24%	86.36%	84.78%
Can speak	49.49%	51.09%	48.88%	51.18%
Can read	24.36%	37.98%	47.24%	58.35%
Can write	7.03%	15.17%	24.07%	31.77%
Source: Conselleria d'Educació, Cultura i Esport(2010) Cens 2011. Dades generals coneixement

Most of the population have at least a passive knowledge of Valencian, which allows normal communication in this language across the Valencian Community. Thanks to its implementation in public administration and the education system in recent decades, knowledge of Valencian has increased phenomenally both in absolute and relative terms, most significantly in the case of its written standard. The source also reveals that knowledge varies greatly within the territory, with knowledge in the Province of Alicante being consistently lower than in Castellón and Valencia.

==== Social use ====
Languages spoken at home
Use	Valencian	Spanish
Always	28.8%	56.2%
More often	3%	2.6%
Alternatively	5.6%	
Other languages	3.8%	
Source: Conselleria d'Educació, Cultura i Esport (2010) Knowledge and social use of Valencian

Despite the increase in knowledge of Valencian, its social use in relative terms is declining, with only a third of the population using it at home according to the Generalitat in 2010. The data collected varies greatly within the Valencian Community, with the percentage of use being over 50% in the regions of Alcoy–Gandia and Júcar–Turia, approximately 40% in Castellón and about 15% in Alicante and the Valencia metropolitan area.

==== Valencian language controversy ====
Despite differences in dialect and denomination, linguists consider Catalan and Valencian two varieties of the same language. They feature relative uniformity in terms of vocabulary, semantics, syntax, morphology and phonology. Mutual intelligibility ranges from 90 to 95%, which is considerably higher than between dialects of an assumed single German language (High German). Furthermore, there is a dialect continuum where speakers at the Catalonia–Valencia border share the same dialect. In practice, Catalan and Valencian share the same written standard, as established by the Institut d'Estudis Catalans (IEC) and the Acadèmia Valenciana de la Llengua (AVL) respectively. Much of the bibliography used in the Valencian education system consists of Catalan works and translations in Catalan with only occasionally some words being swapped for those more commonly used in Valencia. Furthermore, the Universities of Valencia and Alicante refer to Valencian studies of language and literature as Catalan Philology.

In spite of these arguments, a significant proportion of the Valencian population refuse to identify Valencian with Catalan.

== Economy ==
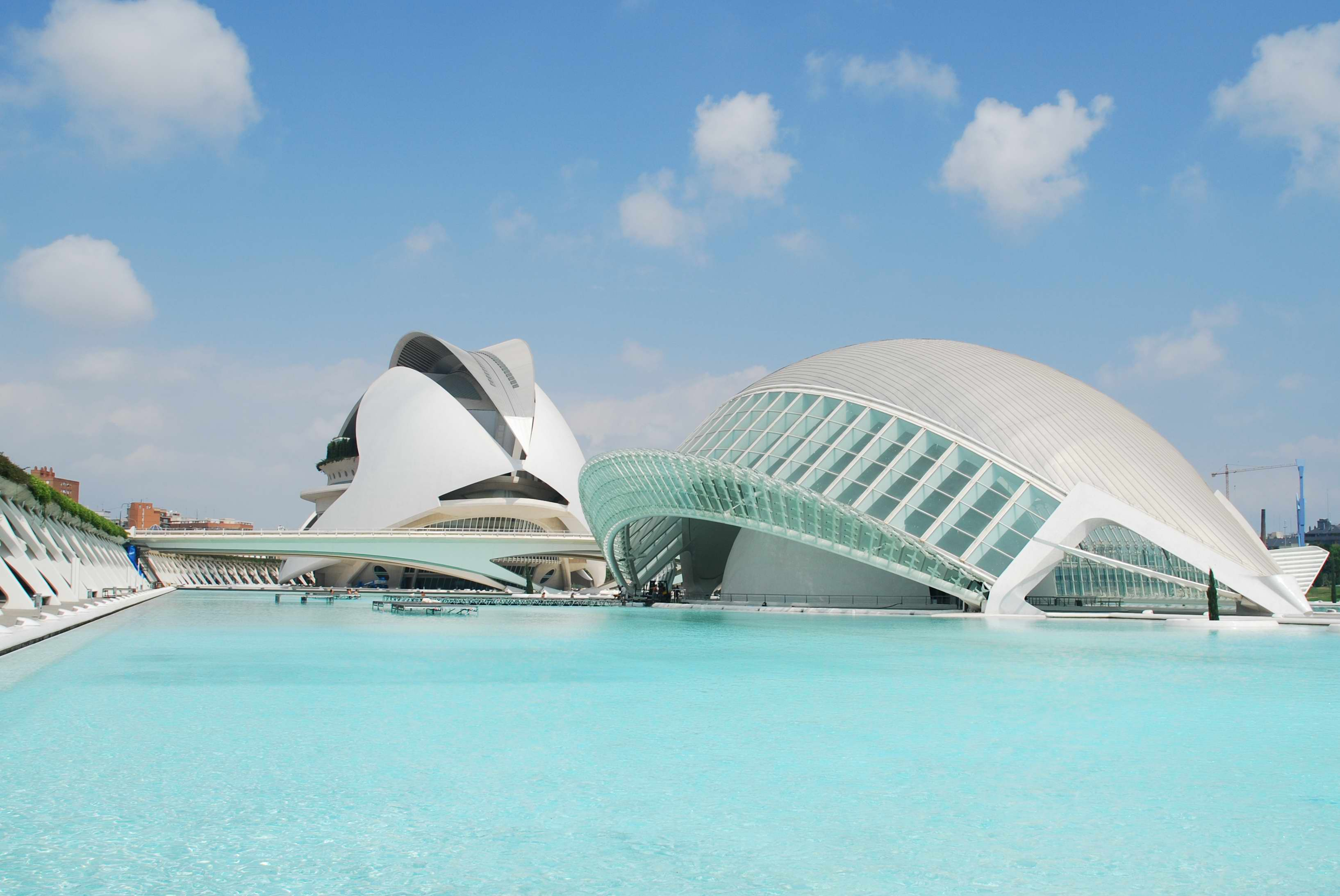
Ciutat de les Arts i les Ciències, Valencia

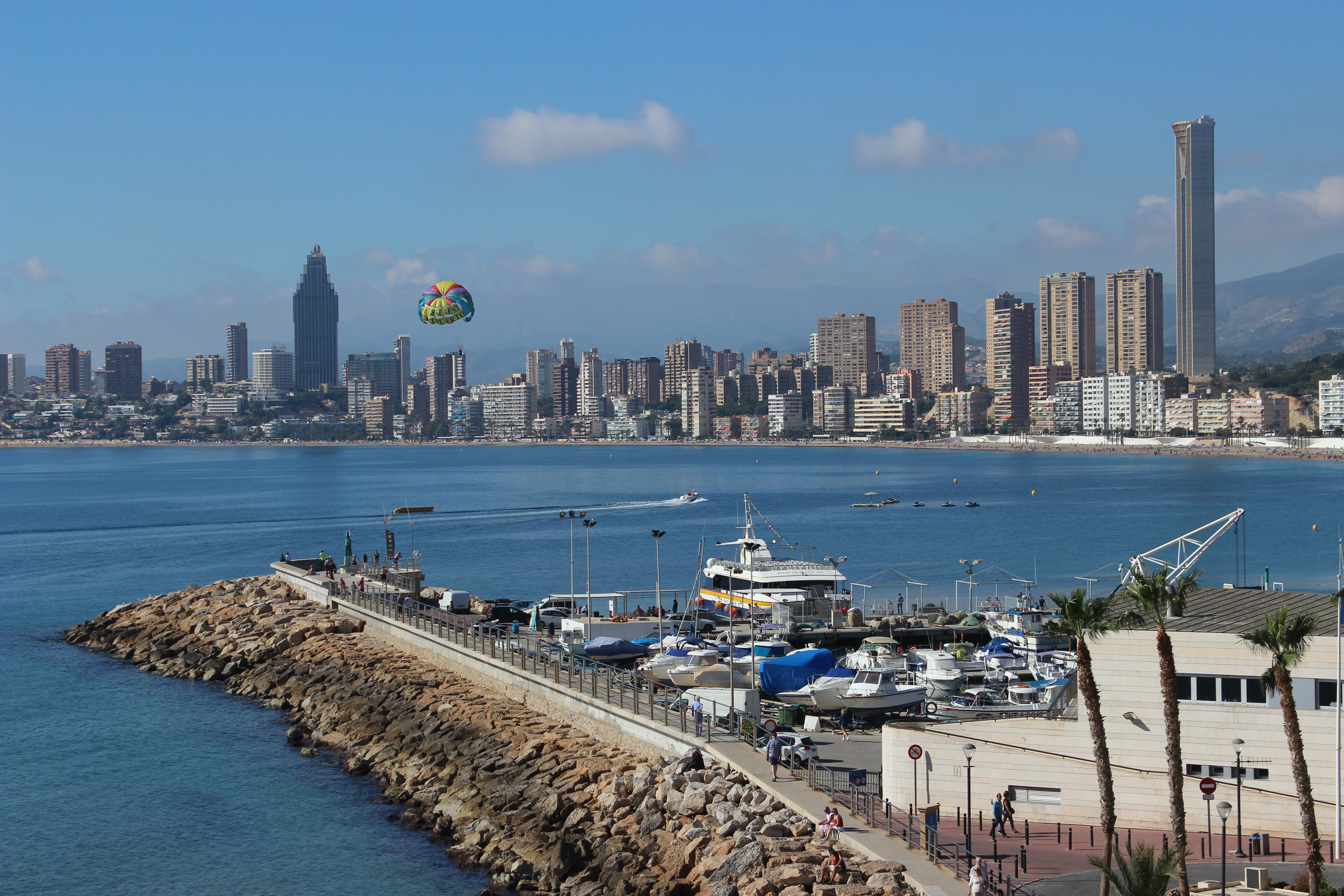
Skyline of Benidorm

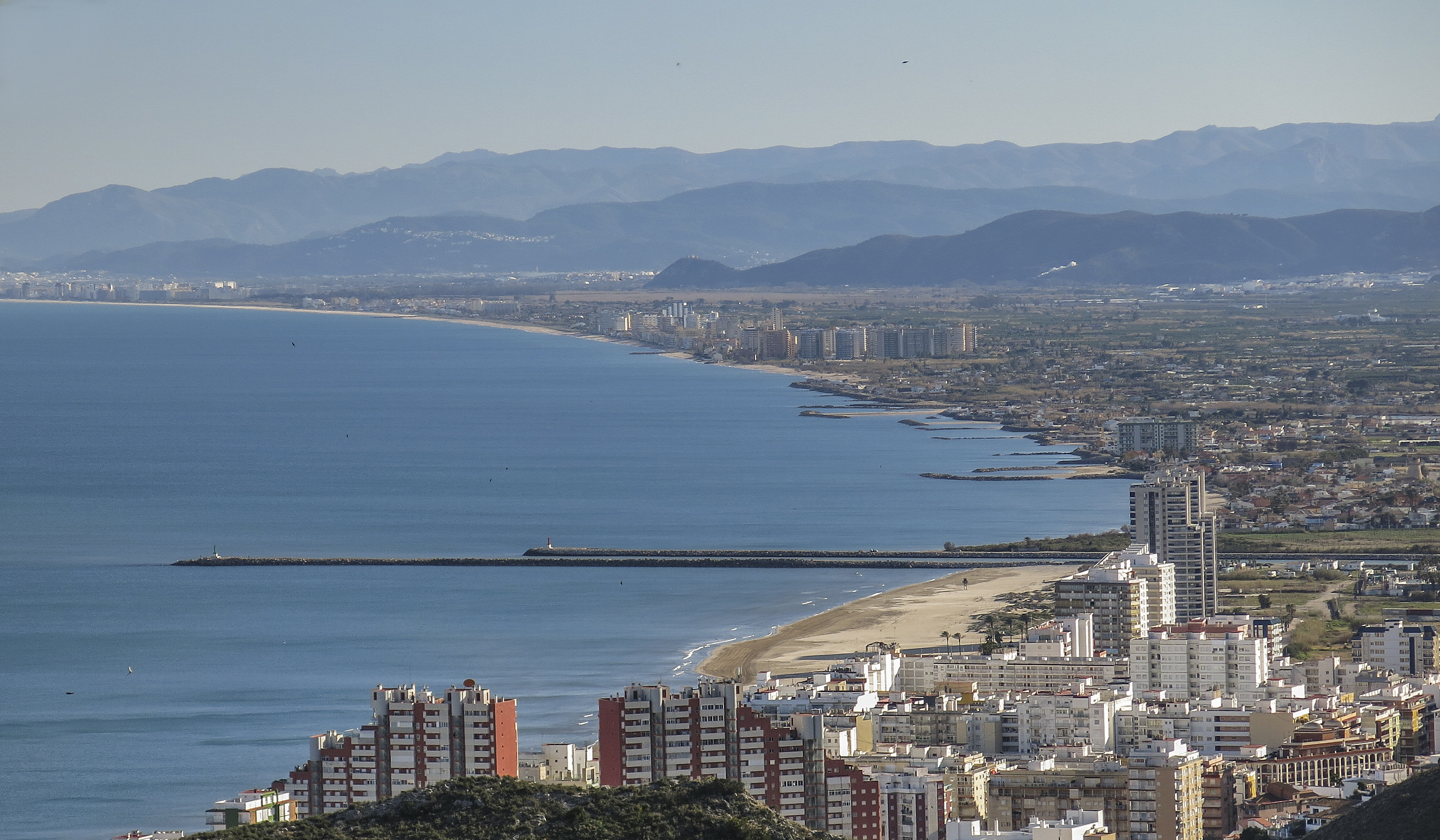
Cullera tourism, town near the Albufera Natural Park

Valencia is long and narrow, running mainly north–south; historically, its rather steep and irregular terrain has made communications and the exploitation of the soil difficult, although the soil of the coastal plain is particularly fertile. This coastal axis has facilitated connections with Europe, either by sea through the Mediterranean, or by land through Catalonia.

The Valencian territory has few natural resources; the only important mineral deposit is the marble quarried in Alicante province.

Hydrological resources (see Geography above) are also lacking: the demand for water exceeds the supply, with this imbalance especially serious in Alicante province. In particularly severe drought years, the problem is managed through occasional nocturnal restrictions during summer and exploitation of aquifers. Valencia's water needs result in harsh contention with neighbouring autonomous communities such as Castilla–La Mancha and Catalonia.

Agriculture—more specifically, citrus cultivation for the export market—was responsible for Valencia's first economic boom in the late 19th century, after centuries of slow development and even decay. Although in absolute terms the agricultural sector has continued to grow, the boom in the secondary and tertiary sectors during the Spanish miracle of the 1960s, has meant that its relative importance has decreased over time. The provinces of Castellón and Valencia still have thousands of hectares of citrus-producing groves and citrus continues to be a major source of income on the countryside. Province of Alicante also grows citrus, but its agriculture is more diversified with a higher presence of vegetables, especially in the Vega Baja del Segura area.

Though the low insulation rate and overall stable weather during the summer may pose a threat to water supplies for agriculture and human consumption, conversely this climate allows tourism to be the province's main industry. Very dense residential housing along the coast, occupied by locals, people from inland Spain and from other EU countries (mostly from the British Isles, Benelux, Germany and Scandinavia), boosts the summertime population (and hydrological demands).

In 2004, Valencia's GDP was 93.9% of the European Union average, although this figure may be too low because of the important presence of foreign residents either from other regions of Europe or as economic immigrants, who are not properly represented in the official statistics. As in all of Spain, there was significant growth in the years immediately following 2004, at least until the 2008–13 Spanish financial crisis.

In 2008, the Valencia Community generated 9.7% of the Spanish GDP. According to human resources, the unemployment rate was over 21% in 2009, and even greater among women, and the rate of activity reached 56.8% in 2002. The typical Valencian business is a small-to-medium-sized company, mainly family-owned and operated, although there are some multinationals.

In addition to tourism, the Valencian Community has significant exports, and it ranks second in this respect among the Spanish autonomous communities, constituting 12% of the national total. Major exports include agricultural products, ceramic tiles, marble products and cars (Ford has an assembly line in Almussafes), which make the port of Valencia one of the busiest in Europe.

=== Unemployment ===
The unemployment rate stood at 15.6% in 2018 and was higher than the national average.

Year	2006	2007	2008	2009	2010	2011	2012	2013	2014	2015	2016	2017	2018
Unemployment rate (in %)	8.3	8.7	12.0	20.8	22.9	24.0	27.2	28.0	25.8	22.8	20.6	18.2	15.6

== Transport ==
=== Air ===
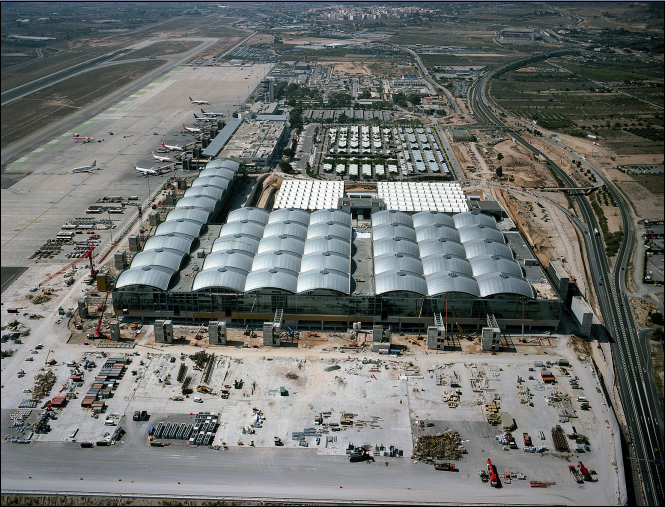
New Alicante Terminal being built

The Valencian Community is served by three international airports: Alicante Airport, Valencia Airport and Castellón–Costa Azahar Airport. Alicante Airport, located in the south, is mainly tourist-oriented and is currently the busiest airport in the Valencian Community. Valencia Airport is located in the capital and carries more business traffic. The third airport, Castellón–Costa Azahar Airport, is located in the north of the Valencian territory and has several international connections. This airport was opened in 2011 but its first commercial flight arrived in September 2015, so it has been considered as a white elephant due to its expensive construction and maintenance and relatively less usefulness.

A new terminal at Alicante Airport was opened in March 2011. The New Alicante Terminal (NAT) replaced the other two existing terminals T1 and T2, doubling the passenger capacity of the airport to 20m passengers per annum. Valencia airport is also being expanded to serve the higher passenger demand due to new flight connections to the city.

=== Train ===
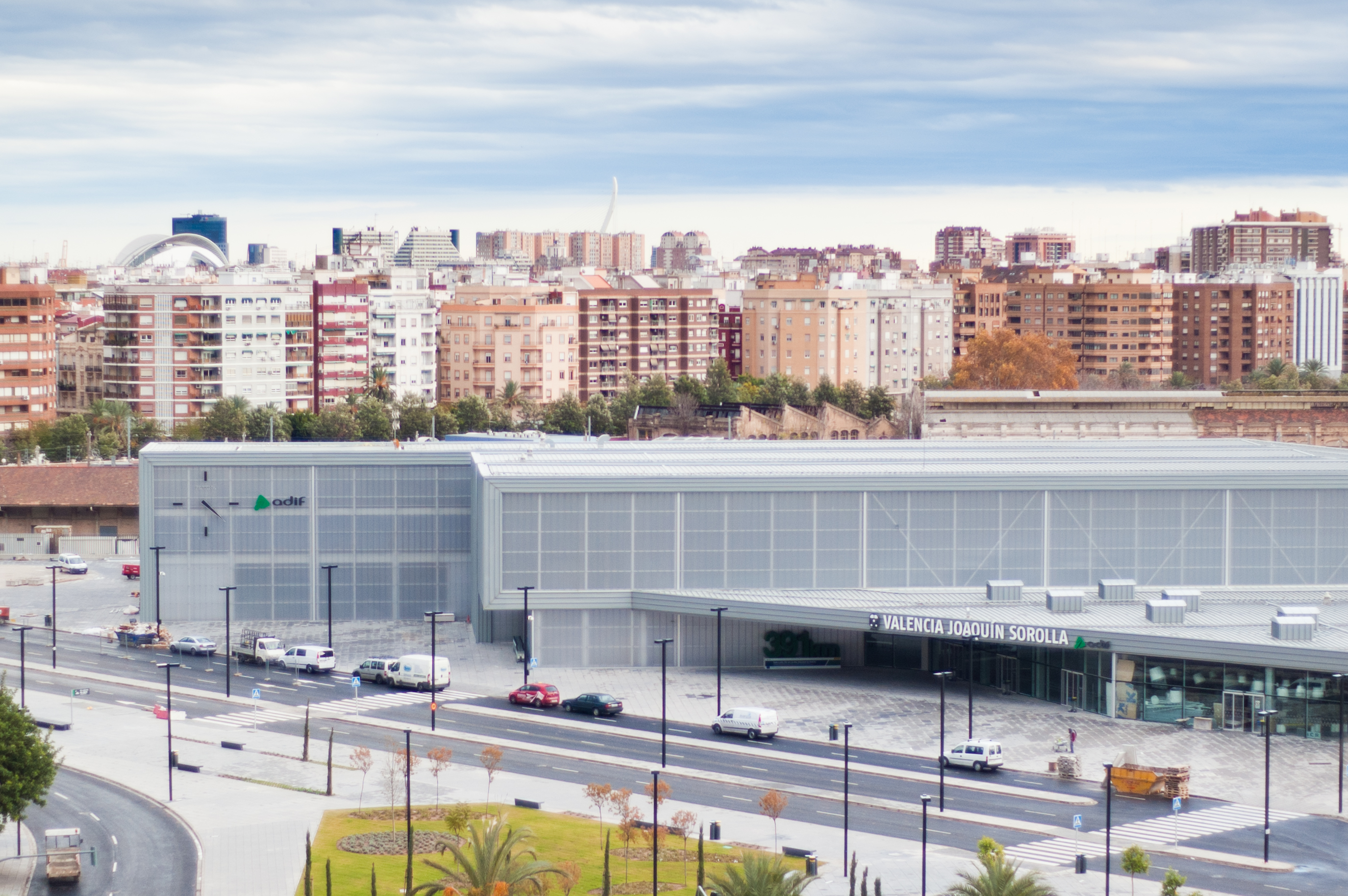
Provisional station of Valencia

The Valencian Community has an extensive rail system which connects the principal cities with the rest of Spain such as the Euromed towards Catalonia and AVE towards Madrid, or northern and southern Spain, both run by the Spanish national rail company Renfe.

In December 2010 the high-speed rail (AVE) Madrid–Valencia opened as part of the Madrid–Levante high-speed rail line. High-speed lines arrive to Valencia-Joaquín Sorolla, a provisional station located south of the city centre. It is expected that in the coming years the high-speed line Madrid–Valencia will reach the main Valencia-Estació del Nord through a tunnel under the new Valencia Parque Central.

High-speed rail Madrid–Alicante opened in 2013.

There are some medium-range plans for further high-speed connections, like the Valencia–Bilbao link via Zaragoza or the Mediterranean high-speed rail corridor.

In addition, the Generalitat Valenciana has planned on building a regional high-speed rail along the coast to connect all major coastal cities like Valencia, Gandia, Dénia, Benidorm, Villajoyosa, Alicante and Torrevieja.

==== Commuter rail and metro ====
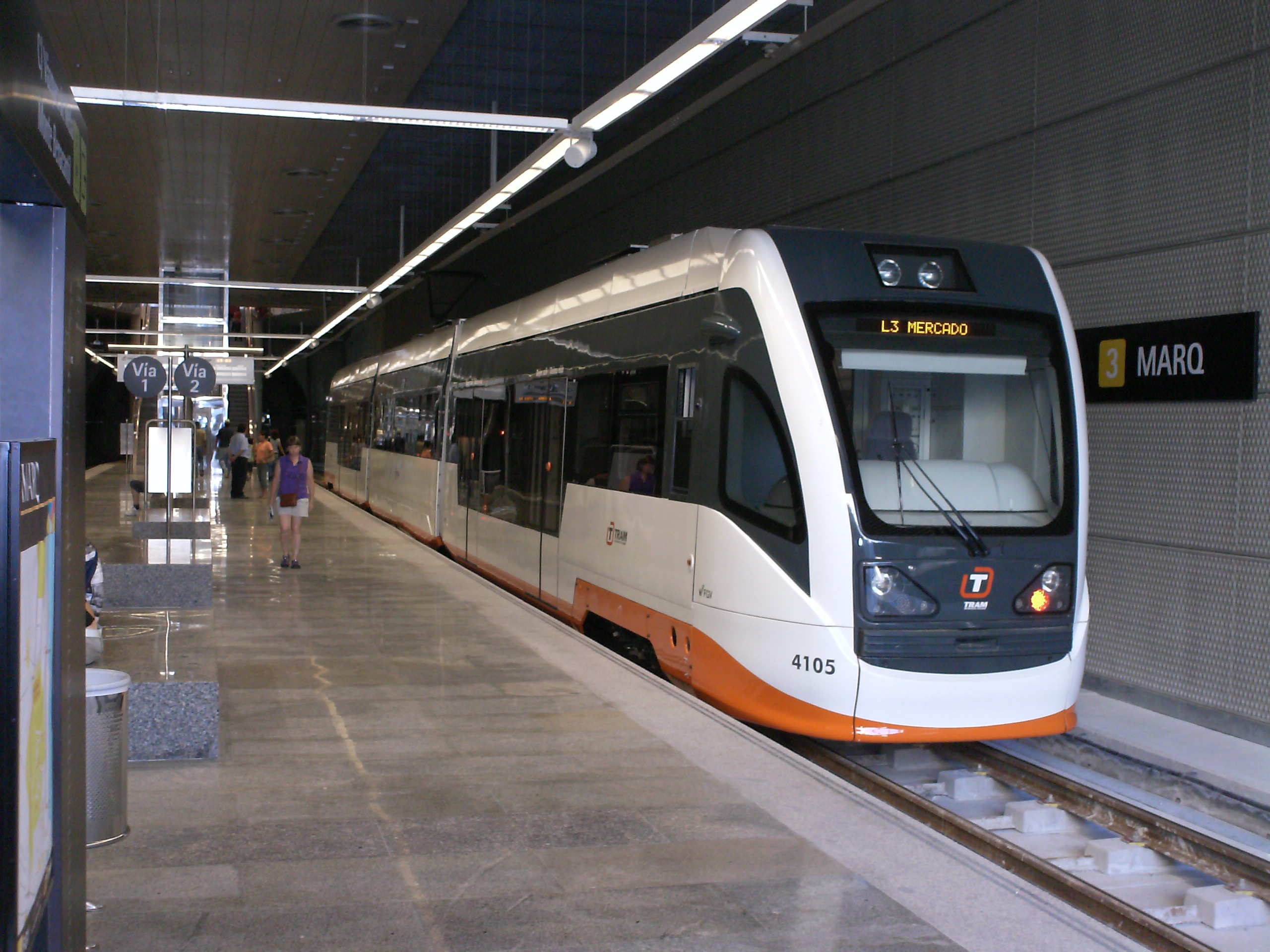
Alicante light tram through the city centre

Cercanías (Rodalia in Valencian) is the commuter rail service that serves all three provincial capitals of Valencia and their metropolitan areas. It is operated by Cercanías Renfe, the commuter rail division of Renfe.

Meanwhile, the Valencian-owned company Ferrocarrils de la Generalitat Valenciana (FGV) operates a tram-train line between Alicante, Benidorm and Dénia. It also operates the city tram and metro system of Valencia (Valencia Metro) and Alicante (Alicante Tram). There is also a new guided-trolleybus system (branded as a TRAM) that opened in 2008 in Castellón de la Plana and its metropolitan area. Both the Valencia metro and Alicante tram are being extended to serve uncovered areas, like the new tram line planned to open in the coming months towards the University of Alicante and Sant Vicent del Raspeig.

=== Ports ===
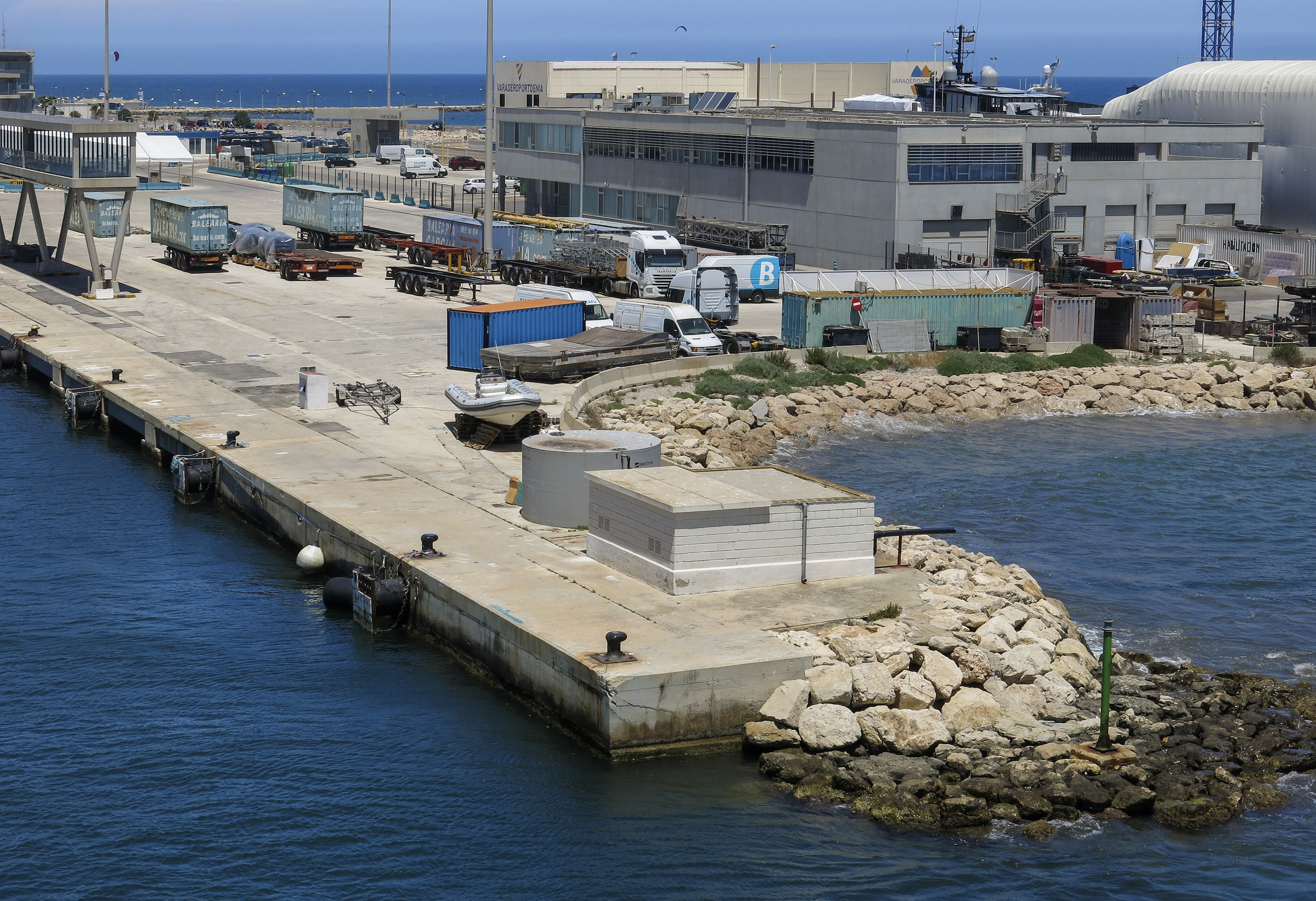
Port of Dénia

By sea, the Valencian Community is served by several ferry routes and cargo ports, and in the major cities, Valencia and Alicante, cruise ships dock on a regular basis.

In point 20 of article 149 of the Spanish Constitution, referring to the exclusive powers of the State, direct reference is made to the ownership of the ports of general interest, which in the Valencian case are those of Alicante, Castellón, Valencia, Sagunt and Gandia. For this reason, all these ports are managed by the public body, dependent on the Ministry of Development. This body is in charge of executing the port policy of the government and of coordinating and controlling the efficiency of the port system, made up of 28 Port Authorities that they administer the 46 ports of general interest of the State. There are 3 Port Authorities of the Valencian Community, which manage the 5 Valencian ports of general interest. Thus, the Port Authority of Valencia is in charge of managing the ports of Valencia, Sagunt and Gandia, while those of Alicante and Castellón only manage their reference port. In addition to the ports of general interest, there are also other ports, known as the ports of the Generalitat Valenciana. There are currently 35 ports dependent on the Generalitat, of which 16 are managed directly by the Generalitat, while the rest are managed from the private sector through concession. Some of the main ports managed by the Valencian Government are those of Altea, Benicarló, Benidorm, Borriana, Calp, Cullera, Dénia, Tabarca, Xàbia, Moraira, Peníscola, Santa Pola, Torrevieja, La Vila Joiosa, Vinaròs, etc. In the Valencian Community, the body entrusted with the responsibility of creating the necessary infrastructures that allow the development of the Valencian ports network is the Entity of the Transport and Ports Network of the Valencian Community, dependent on the Department of Infrastructure and Transport.

== Public services ==
=== Education ===
State Education in Spain and the Valencian Community is free and compulsory from six to sixteen years of age. The current education system is called LOE (in reference to the Llei Orgànica d'Educació).

- From three to six years: Preparatory School (Infantil, popularly known as Preescolar)
- From six to twelve years: Primary School (Primaria)
- From twelve to sixteen years: Compulsory Secondary School (Secundaria)
- From sixteen to eighteen years: Post-Secondary School (Bachillerato)

Children from three to five years old in the Valencian Community have the option of attending the infantil or pre-school stage, which is non-compulsory and free for all students. It is regarded as an integral part of the education system with infantil classes in almost every primary school. There are some separate nursery schools.

Valencian students aged six to sixteen undergo primary and secondary school education, which are compulsory and free of charge. Successful students are awarded a Secondary Education Certificate, which is necessary for entering further (optional) education as for their University or Vocational Studies. Once students have finished their Batxillerat (Spanish: Bachillerato), they can take the PAU exams (Proves d'Accés a la Universitat), commonly known as Selectiu.

The secondary stage of education is normally referred to by their initials, e.g. ESO standing for Educació Secundària Obligatòria.

The Valencian Community is home to a number of prestigious universities like the University of Valencia, founded in 1499. At the request of James I of Aragon, Pope Innocent IV in 1246, authorized by a papal bull the establishment of estudis generals in Valencia. The University Statutes were passed by the municipal magistrates of Valencia on 30 April 1499; this is considered to be the 'founding' of the university. In 1501, Pope Alexander VI signed the bill of approval and one year later Ferdinand II of Aragon proclaimed the Royal Mandatory Concession. Only very meagre accounts have been preserved of the practical workings of the university. From the time of its foundation the courses included Latin, Greek, Hebrew, Arabic, philosophy, mathematics, physics, theology, Canon law, and medicine.

Nowadays the Polytechnic University of Valencia has become one of the most prestigious universities in Spain, according to its technology, investigation, several degrees offering a close relation with some the most important universities in the world such as Cambridge, Oxford and Harvard. Most faculties and colleges are based in the city of Valencia, with some branches in Gandia and Alcoy.

Other universities are University of Alicante, Miguel Hernández University in Elche, Jaume I University and Valencian International University in Castellón de la Plana, Catholic University of Valencia, and CEU Cardenal Herrera University in Valencia.

=== Media ===
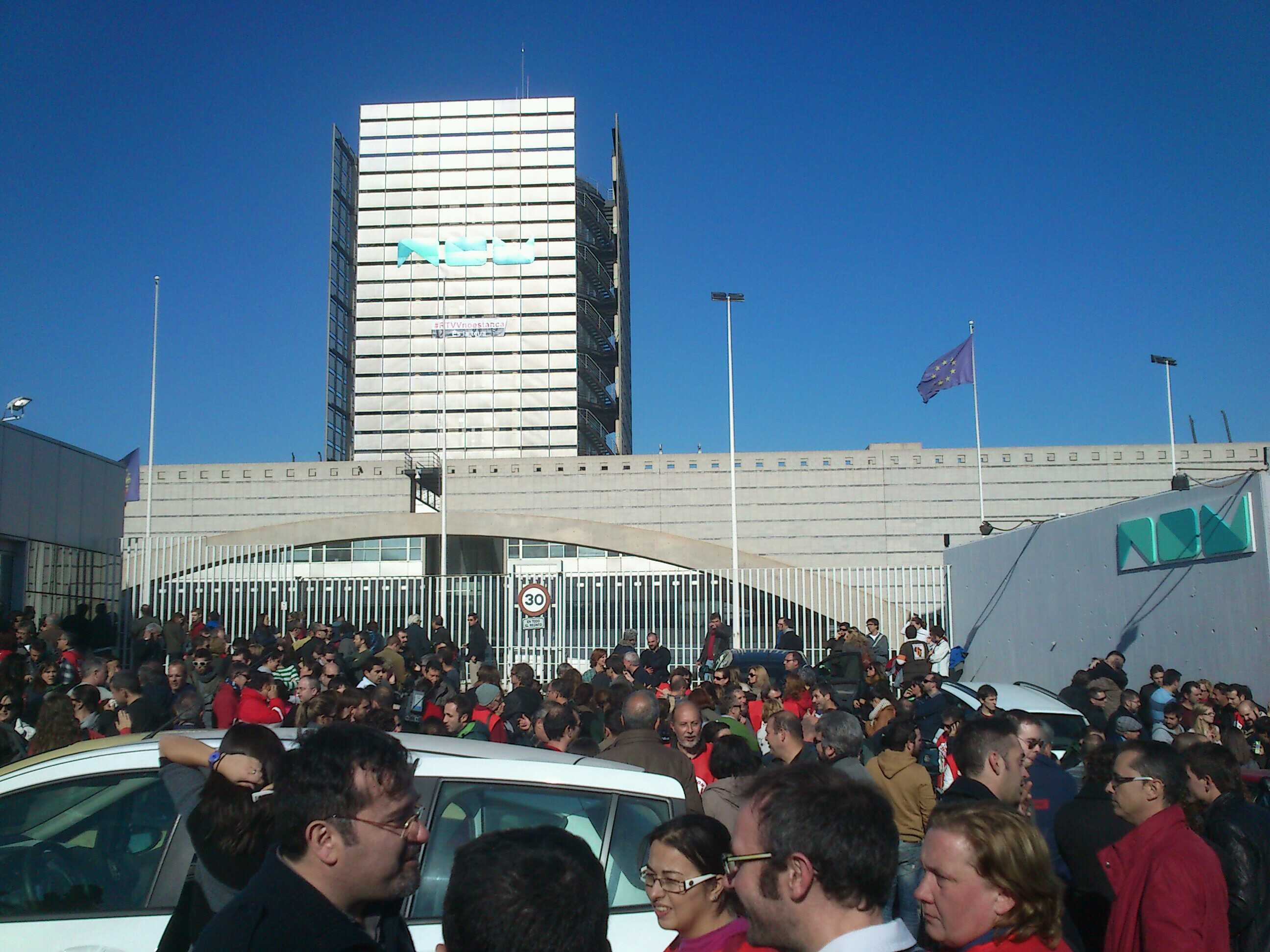
Employees demonstrate in front of the RTVV headquarters in Burjassot the day of its closure.

Until its dissolution in November 2013, the public-service Ràdio Televisió Valenciana (RTVV) was the main broadcaster of radio and television in the Valencian Community. The Generalitat Valenciana constituted it in 1984 in order to guarantee the freedom of information of the Valencian people in their own language.

Prior to its dissolution, the administration of RTVV under the People's Party (PP) had been controversial due to accusations of ideological manipulation and lack of plurality. The news broadcast was accused of giving marginal coverage of the Valencia Metro derailment in 2006 and the indictment of President de la Generalitat Francisco Camps in the Gürtel scandal in 2009. Supervisors appointed by the PP were accused of sexual harassment.

In face of an increasing debt and shrinking audiences that had fallen under 10 and even 5% of share in recent years, RTVV announced in 2012 a plan to shed 70% of its labour. The plan was nullified on 5 November 2013 by the National Court after trade unions appealed against it. On that same day, the President de la Generalitat Alberto Fabra announced RTVV would be closed, claiming that reinstating the employees was untenable. On 27 November, the legislative assembly passed the dissolution of RTVV and employees organized to take control of the broadcast, starting a campaign against the PP. Nou TV's last broadcast ended abruptly when Spanish police pulled the plug at 12:19 on 29 November 2013.

Having lost all revenues from advertisements and facing high costs from the termination of hundreds of contracts, critics question whether the closure of RTVV has improved the financial situation of the Generalitat, and point out to plans to benefit private-owned media. Currently, the availability of media in the Valencian language is extremely limited. All the other autonomous communities in Spain, including the monolingual ones, have public-service broadcasters, with the Valencian Community being the only exception despite being the fourth most populated.

In 2016 the renewed Valencian government announced that a new public media corporation was to be created. The Valencian Media Corporation was founded in July 2016, as it started the creation of a new TV channel and radio station, by the name of À Punt (ɑ̀). In June 2018 the new public TV channel was launched by Valencian Media Corporation, the newly formed agency of the Generalitat Valenciana.

== Sport ==
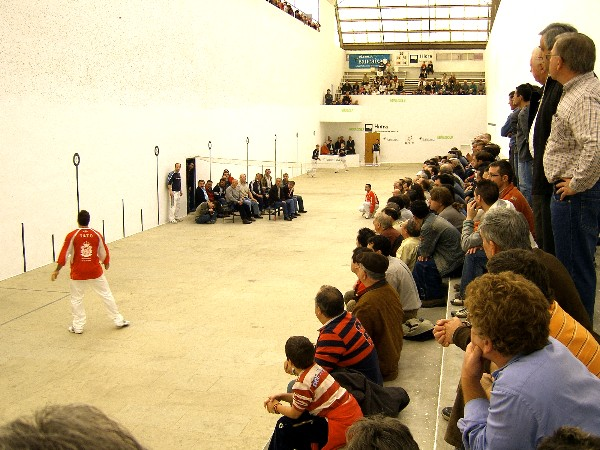
Valencian pilota match

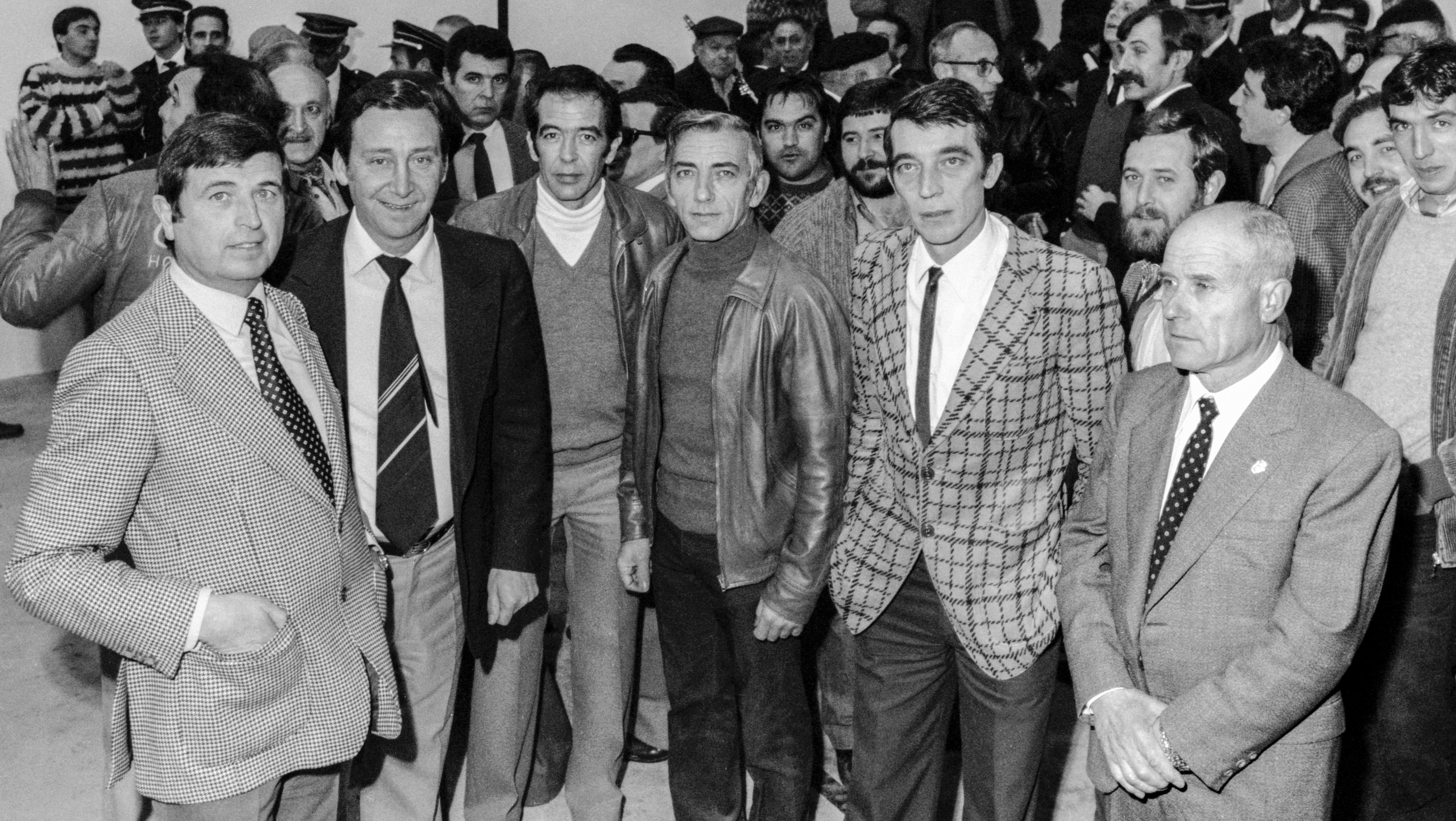
Juliet d'Alginet, Rovellet and other pilotaris, 1982

The autochthonous Valencian sport is the Valencian pilota, which features a professional Valencian Pilota Squad for international matches with related ball games all around the world. This sport has many variants, that may be played at the streets or at special courtfields like the trinquet. It may also be played by teams or on individual challenges. An amazing trait of this sport is that spectators may sit very close or even in the middle of the court. Even while the match is ongoing bookmakers take bets for reds or blues, since these are the colours players must wear, red being the colour of the strongest team or player. The Valencian pilota can be traced to the 15th century, but it was abandoned during modern times, this decadence is being fought back with TV broadcasts, new built colleges have courtfields and a new professional players firm, ValNet

Association football is the most widely known and played sport. There are teams in every town or village, four of which are currently playing in the La Liga 2025-26 season, the Spanish top professional division: Valencia CF (widely considered one of the most successful clubs in Spanish football history, having won six La Liga titles and 8 Copa del Rey), Villarreal CF, Levante UD and Elche CF. Other historical teams that have been in La Liga in the past are CD Alcoyano, Hércules CF and CD Castellón.

Professional basketball is represented currently in Liga ACB, the top professional division, by Valencia Basket, who won its first league title in 2017. Two more teams, CB Lucentum Alicante and AB Castelló are present in the second division.

Regarding female professional sports, the historical BM Sagunto, now disbanded, dominated the women's professional handball scene in Spain through the 1980s and 1990s, with a total of 27 Spanish Division of Honour - Women's handball wins, 20 Cup titles and 1 Women's EHF Champions League. Other important women's handball teams are CB Amadeo Tortajada (dissolved in 2009), CBF Elda, CB Mar Alicante and CB Elche. In female basketball, Ros Casares Valencia has been 8 times champion of the Spanish Women's League and 3 times winner of the EuroLeague Women.

Motorcycle races are very popular, as the Circuit of Valencia race track and its hosted Valencian Community Grand Prix prove. Many Valencian MotoGP pilots such as Héctor Barberá, Héctor Faubel or Nicolás Terol have been competing in different MotoGP classes.

In early February, the annual cycling stage race Volta a la Comunitat Valenciana, which dates back to 1929, is held as the first stage race of the European season.

Another relevant game is the pigeon sport, with an autochthonous dove race being trained, the gavatxut valencià.

Petanca and its variant Calitx are traditional sports as well, especially in towns or among elders.

== Gallery ==
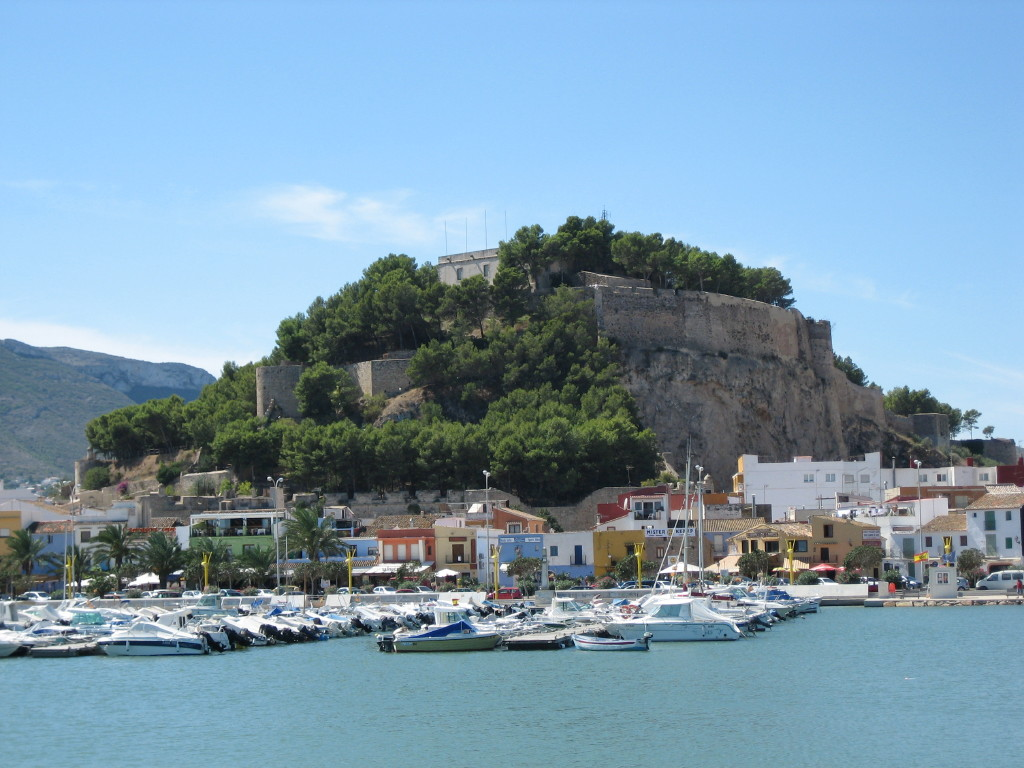
Dénia

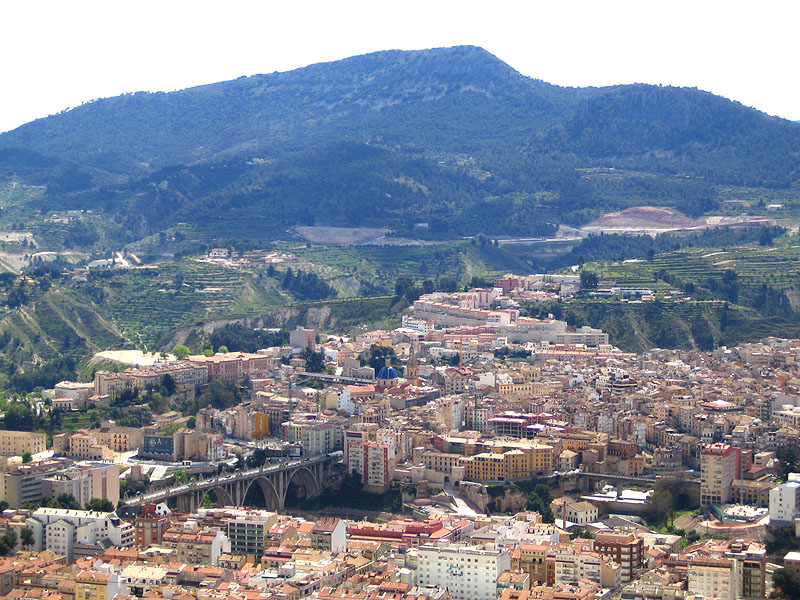
Alcoy

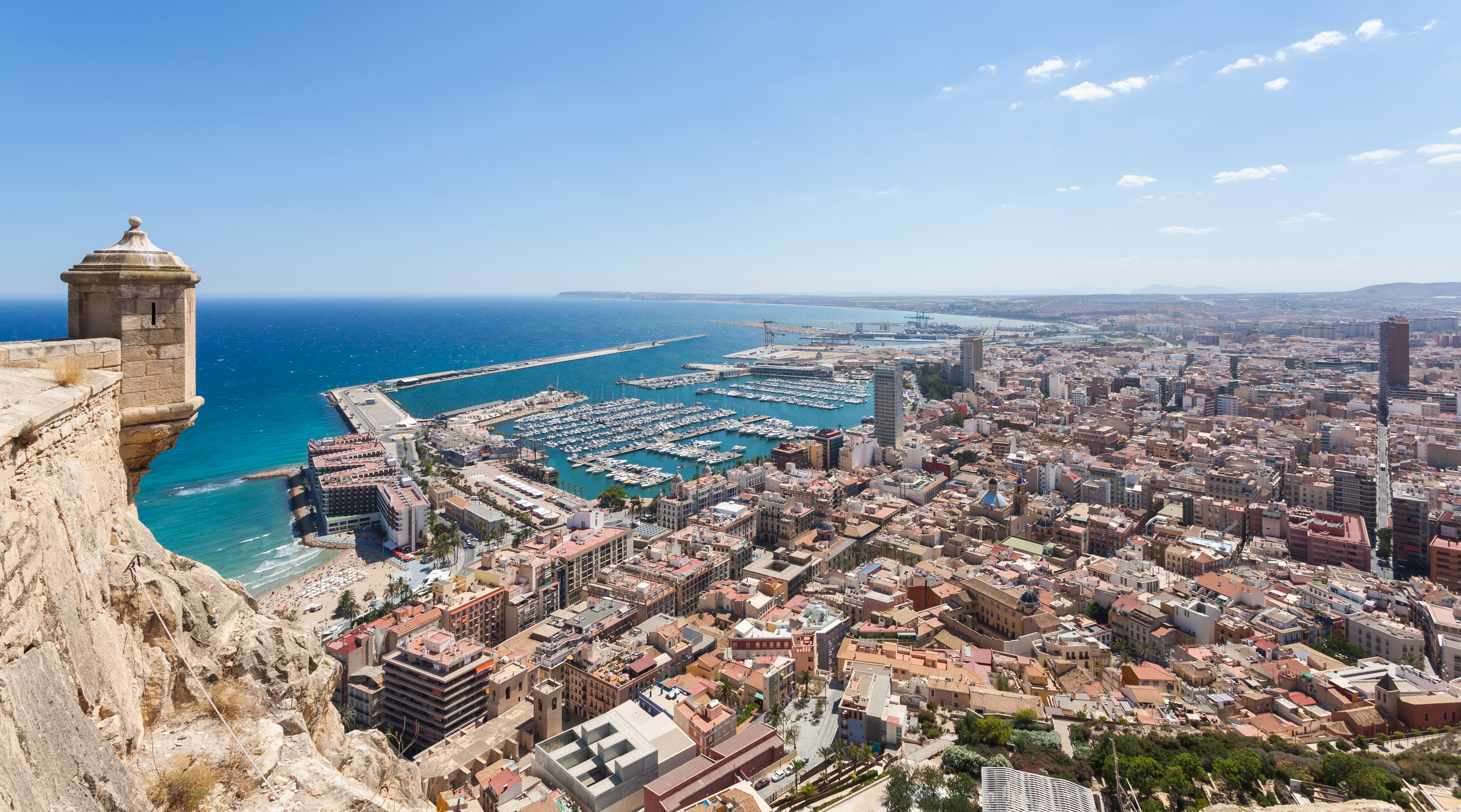
Alicante

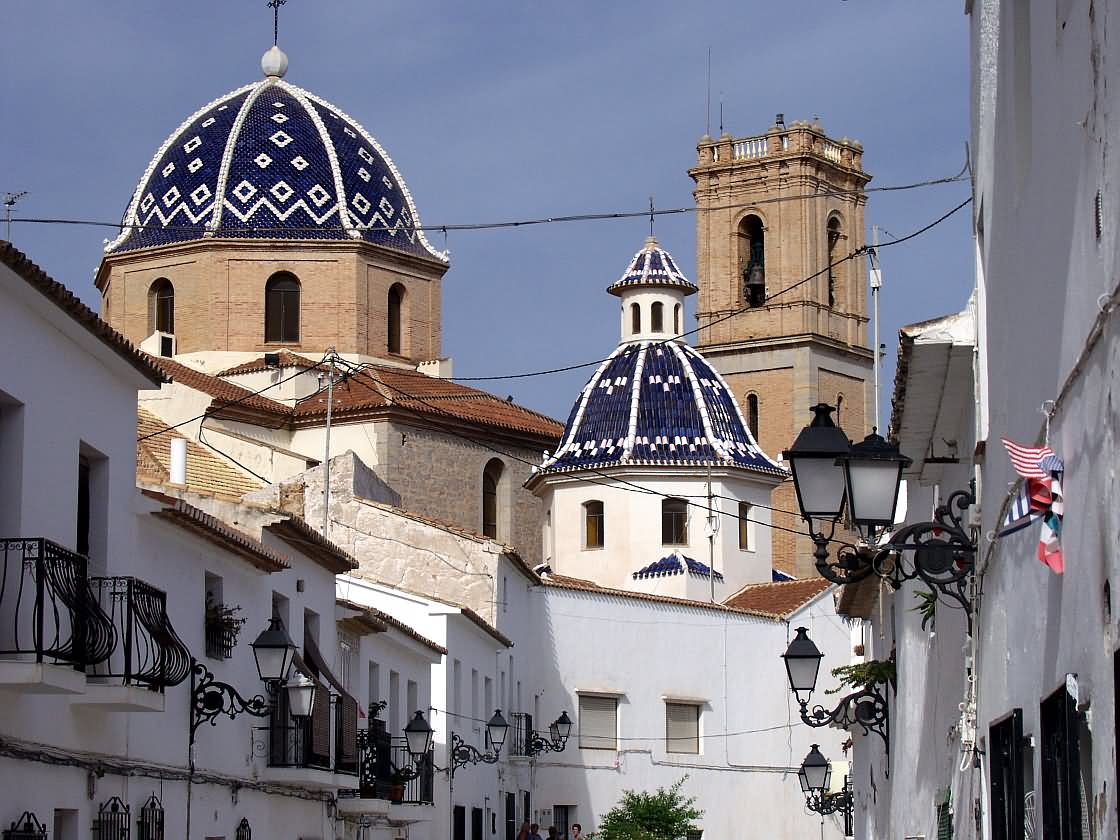
Altea

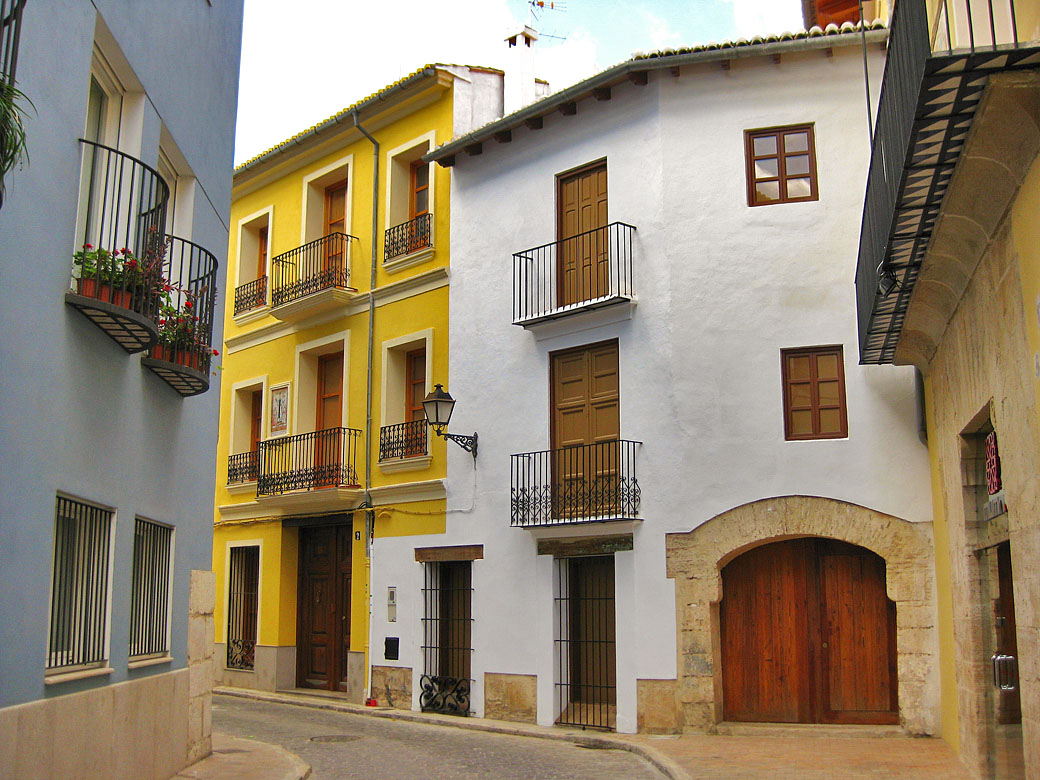
Alzira

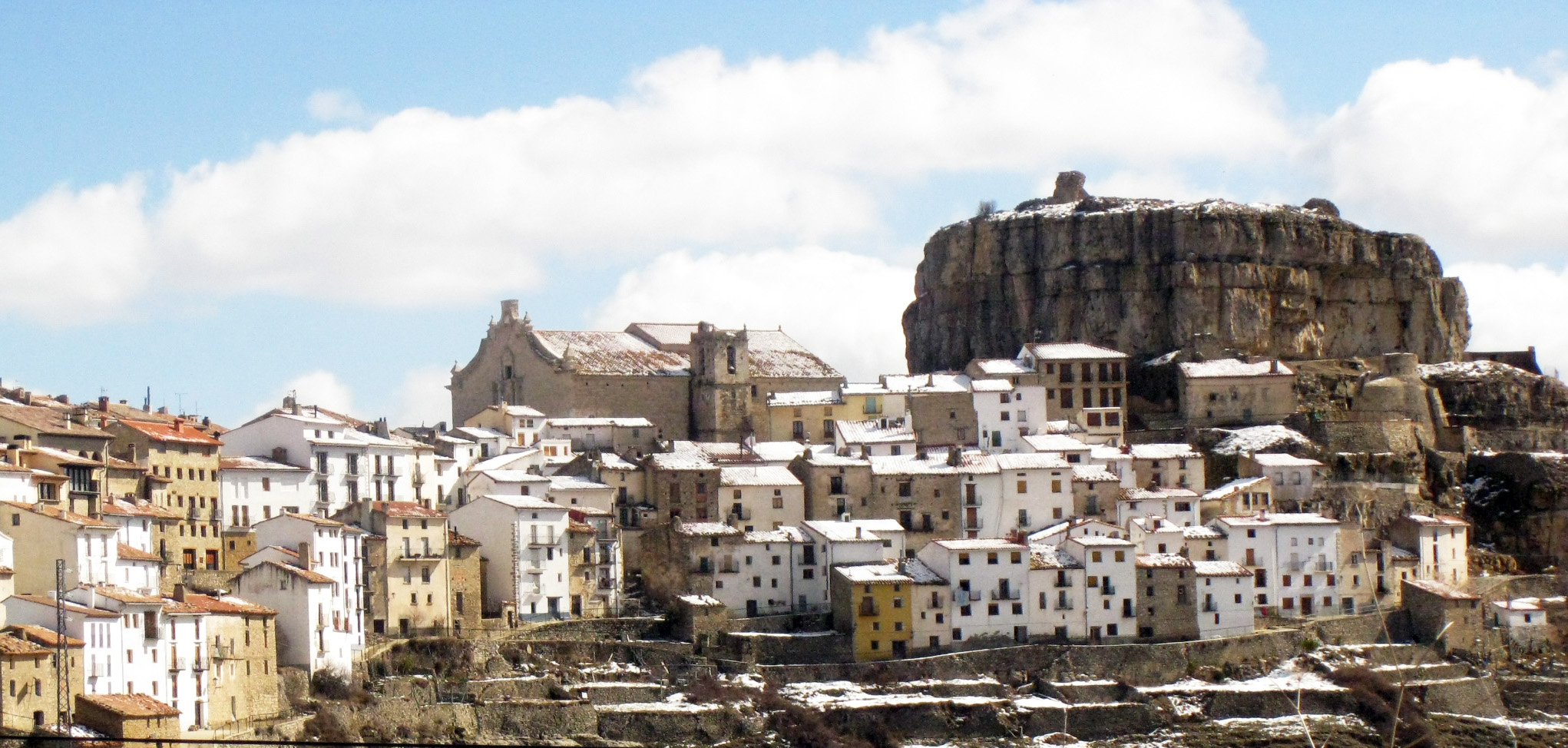
Ares del Maestrat

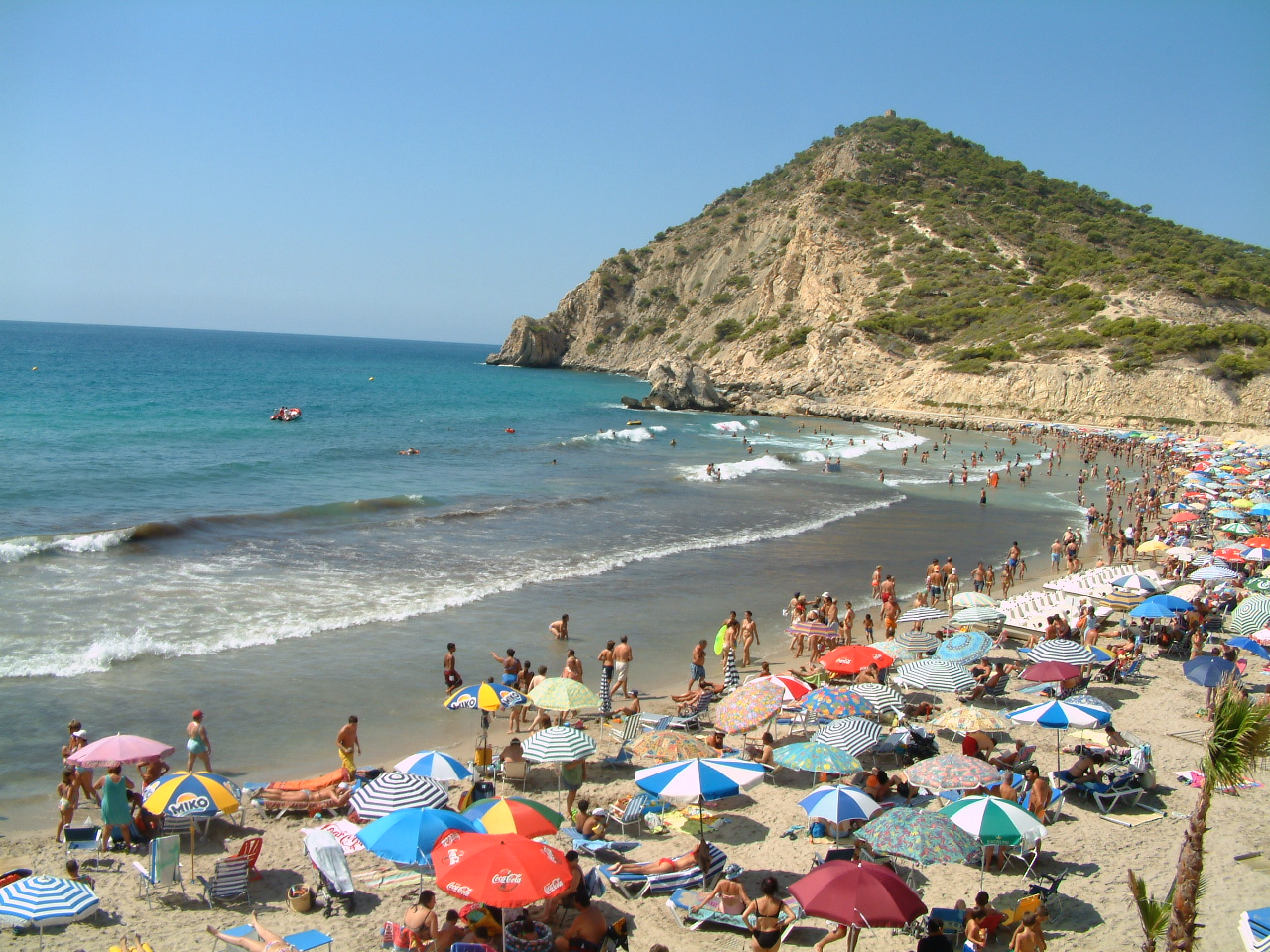
Finestrat

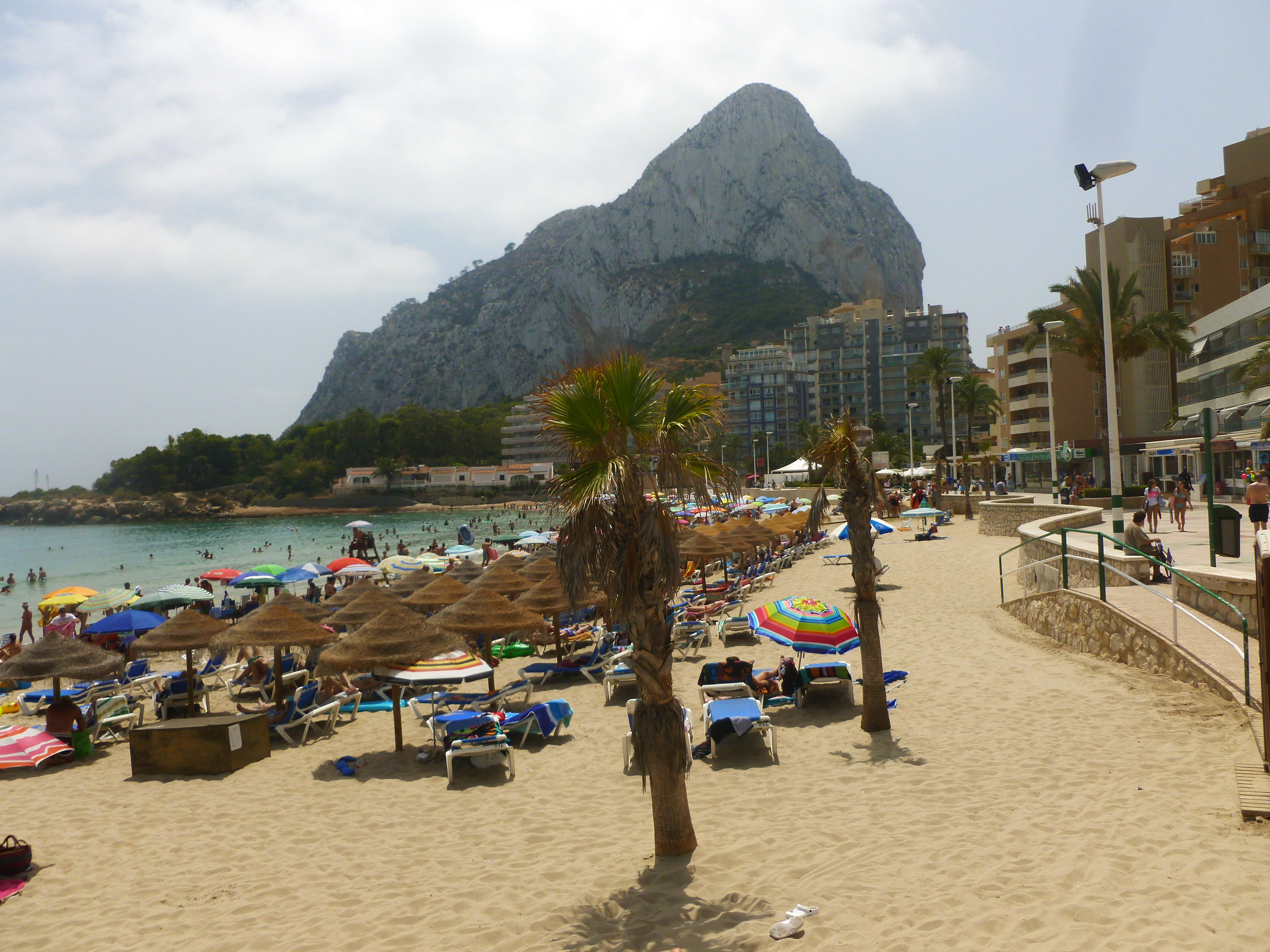
Rock of Ifac in Calp

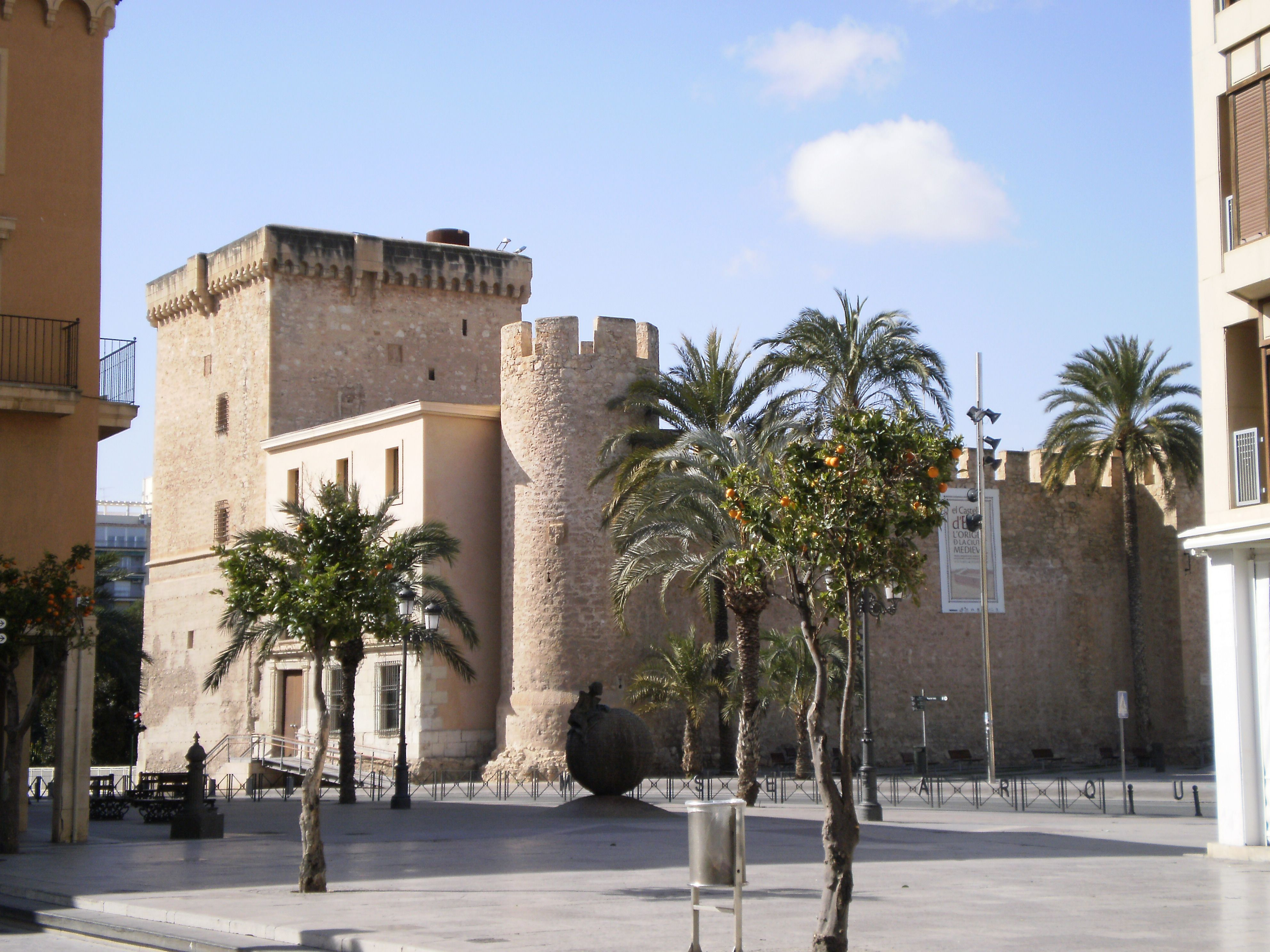
Altamira Palace, Elche

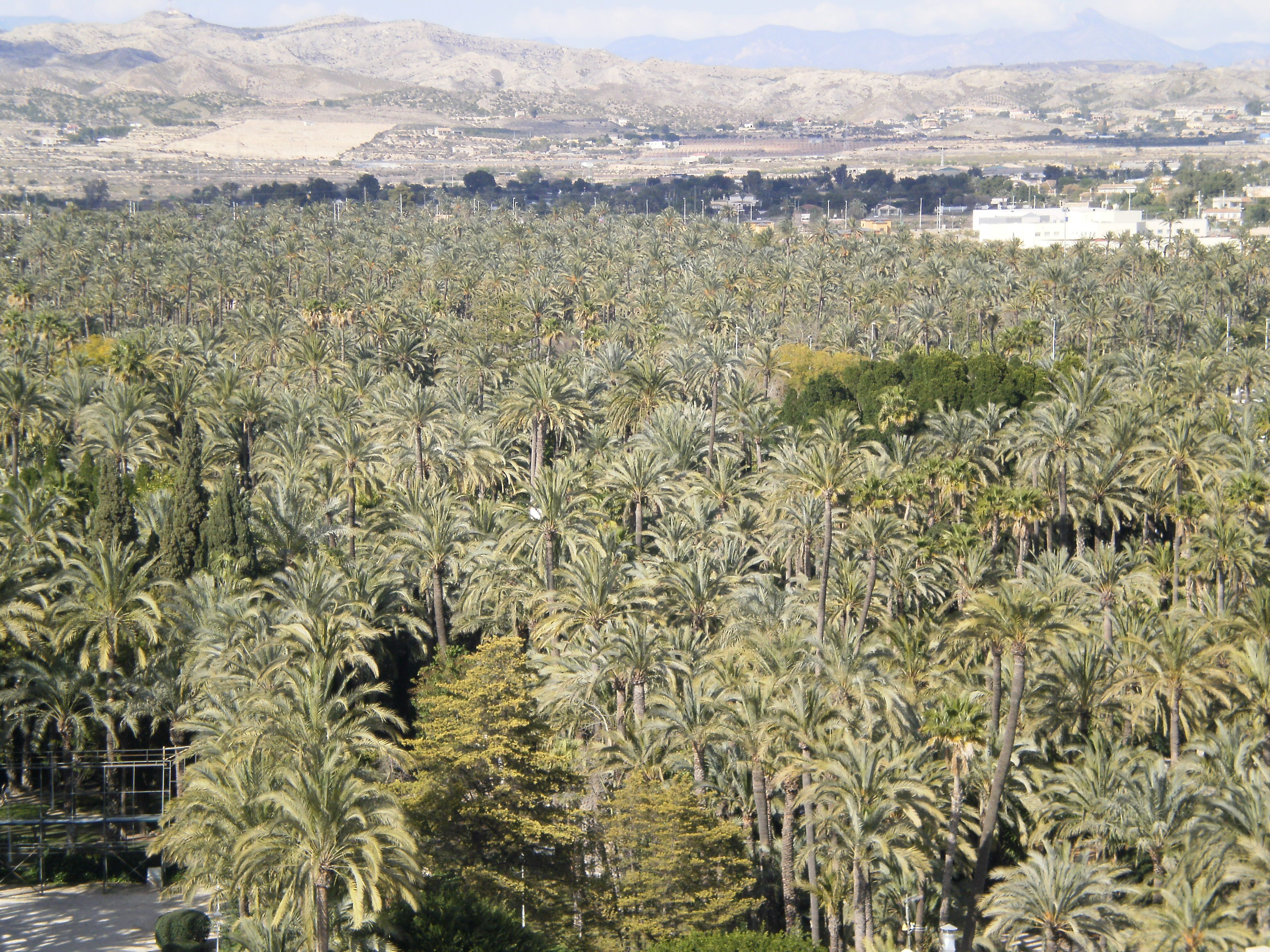
Elche palm grove

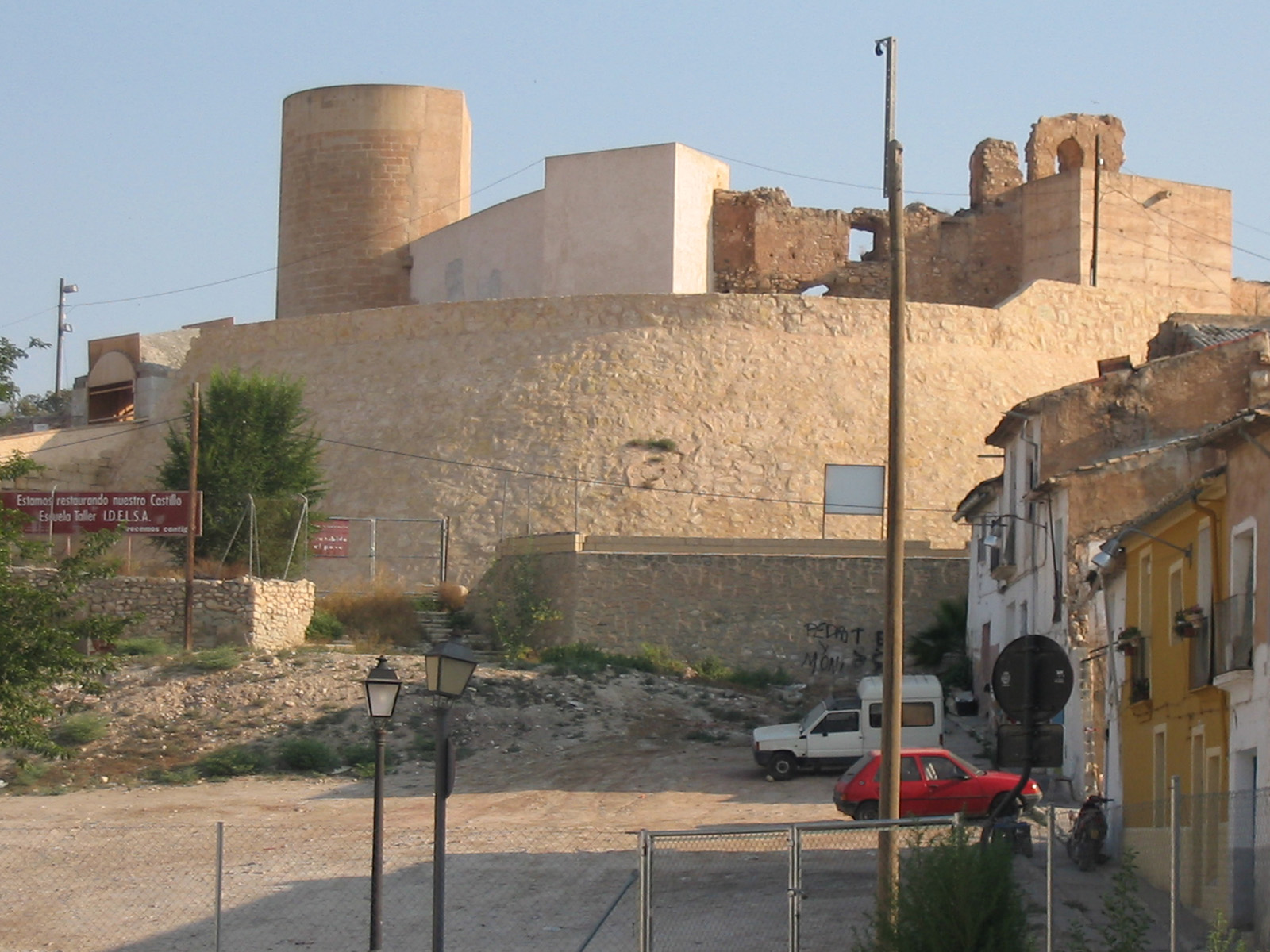
Elda

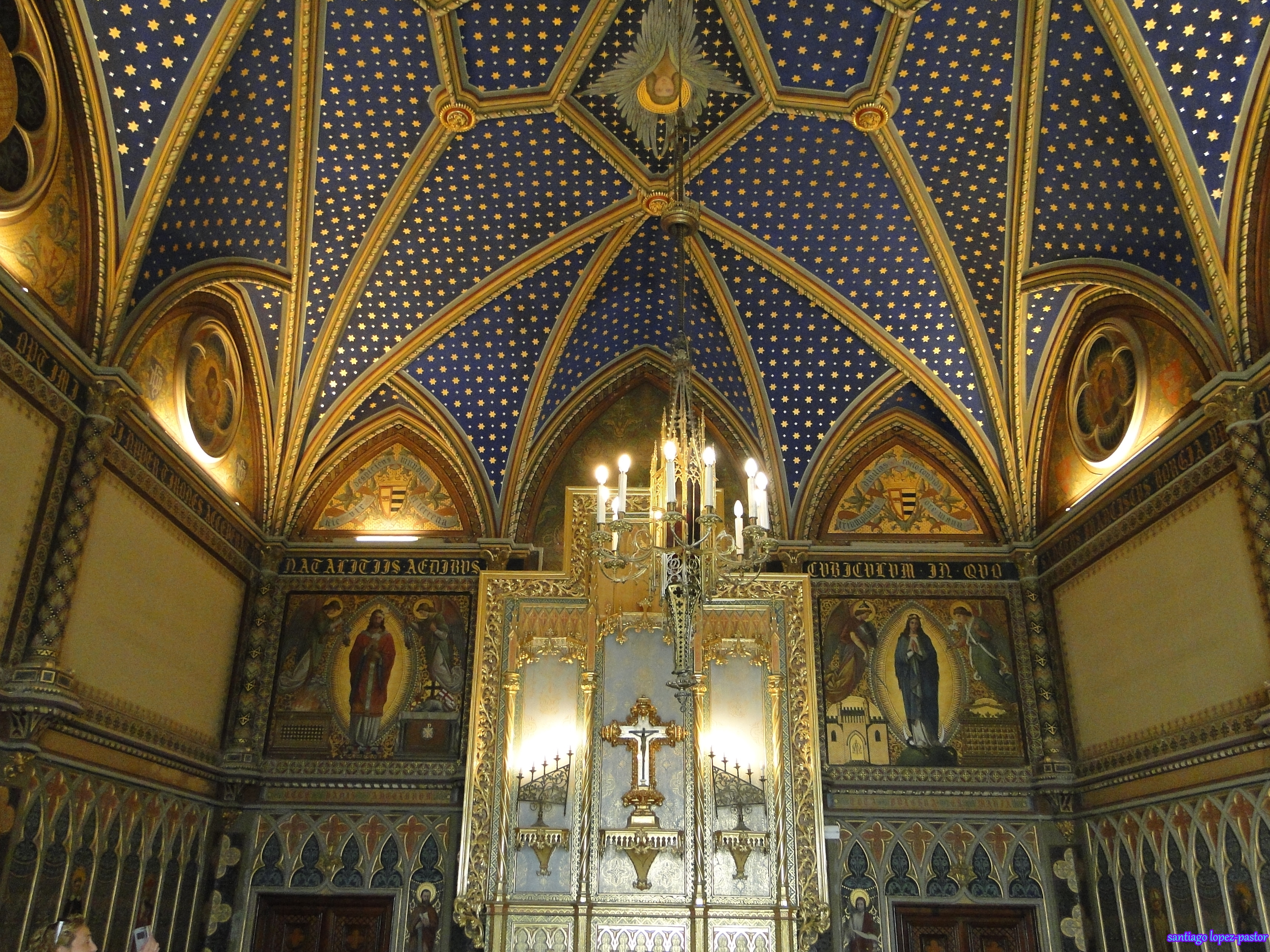
Gandia

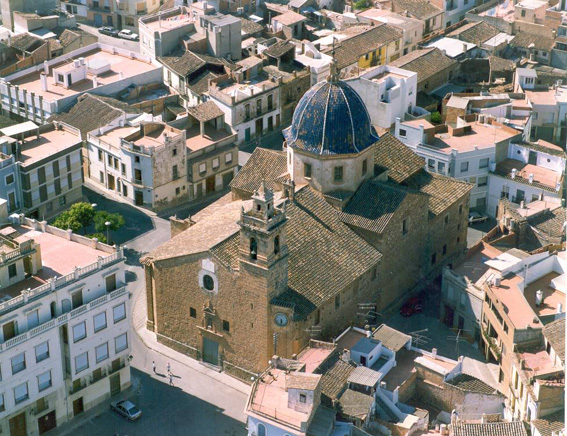
La Vall d'Uixó

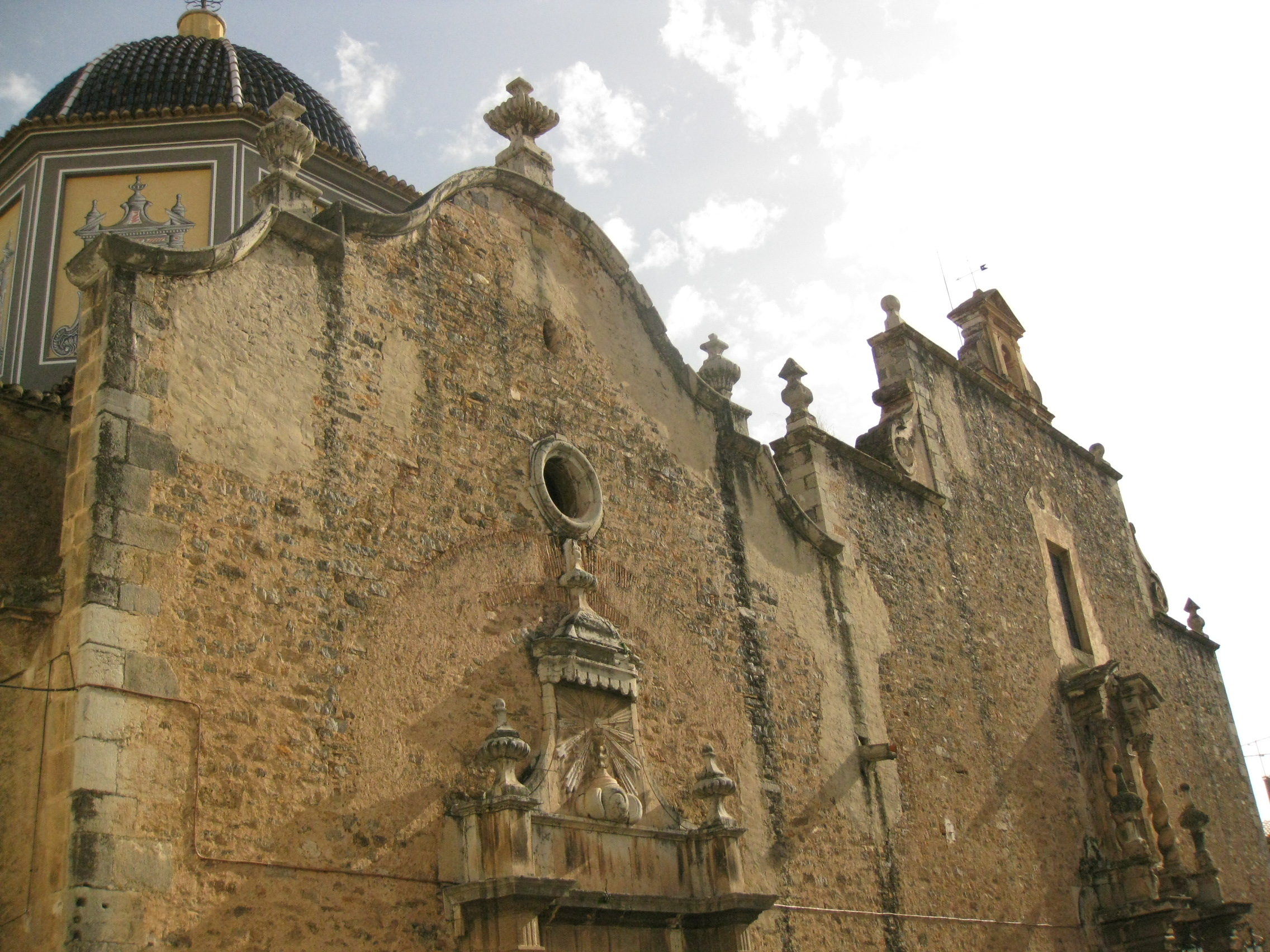
Onda

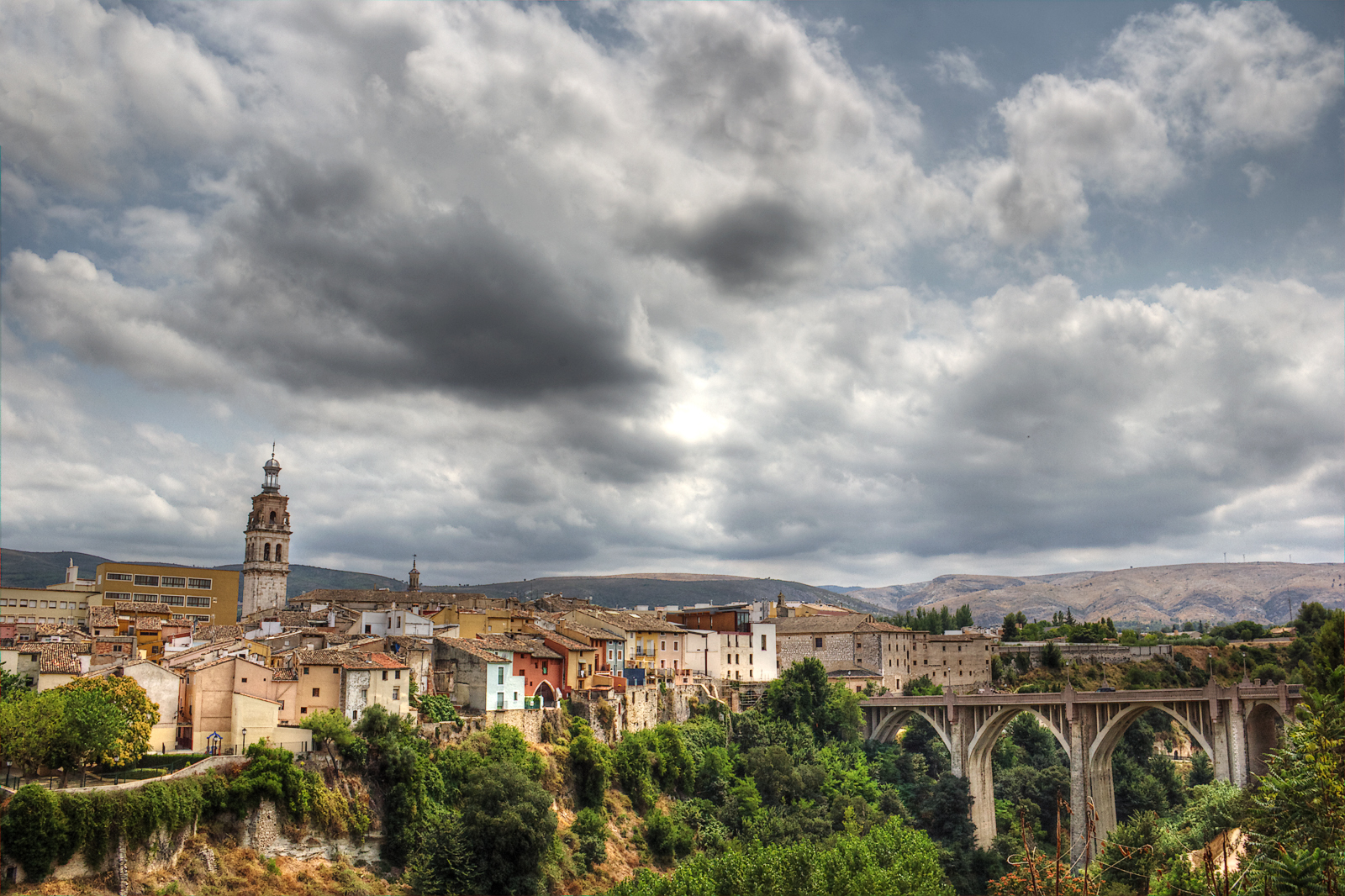
Ontinyent

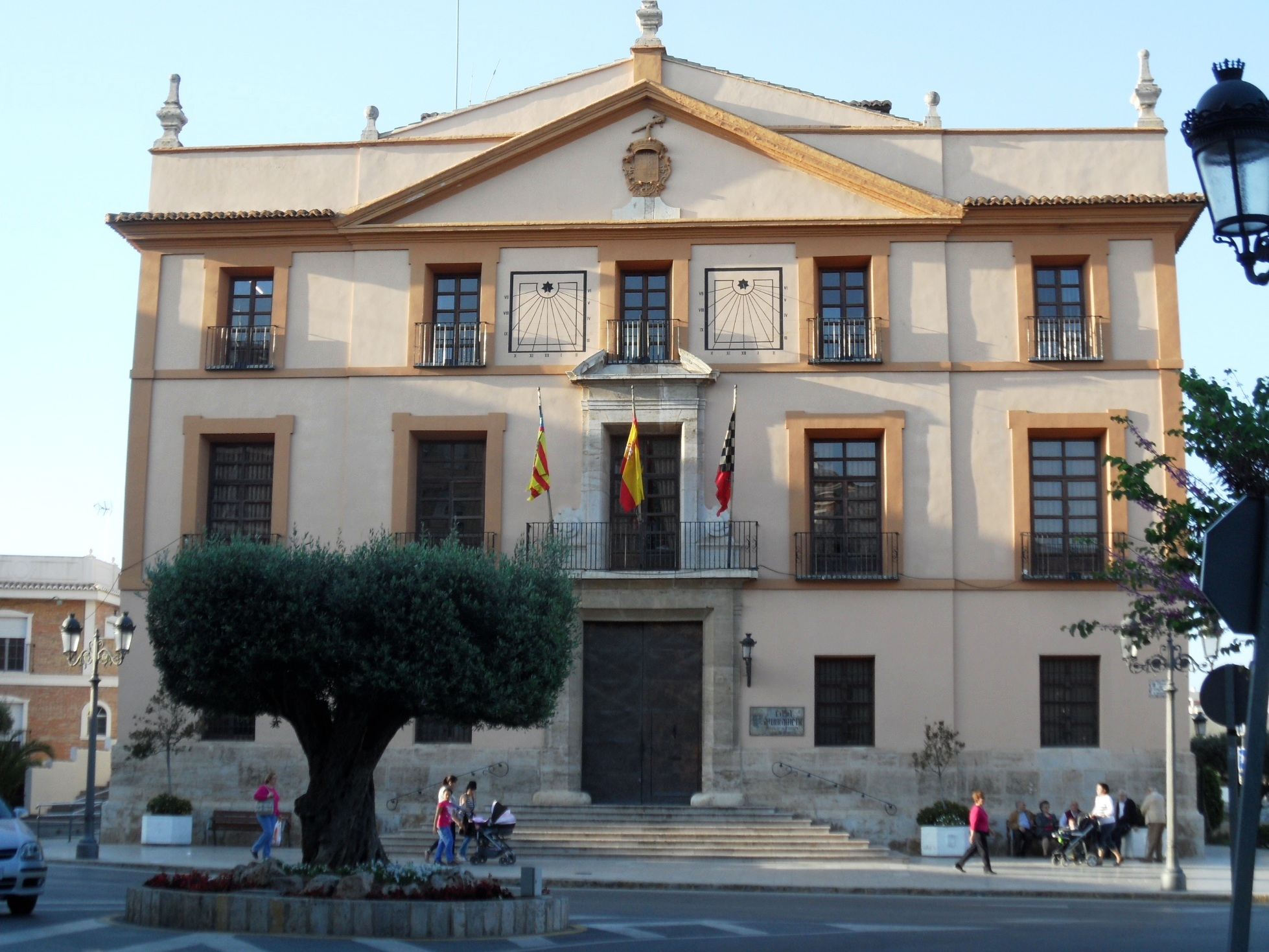
Paterna

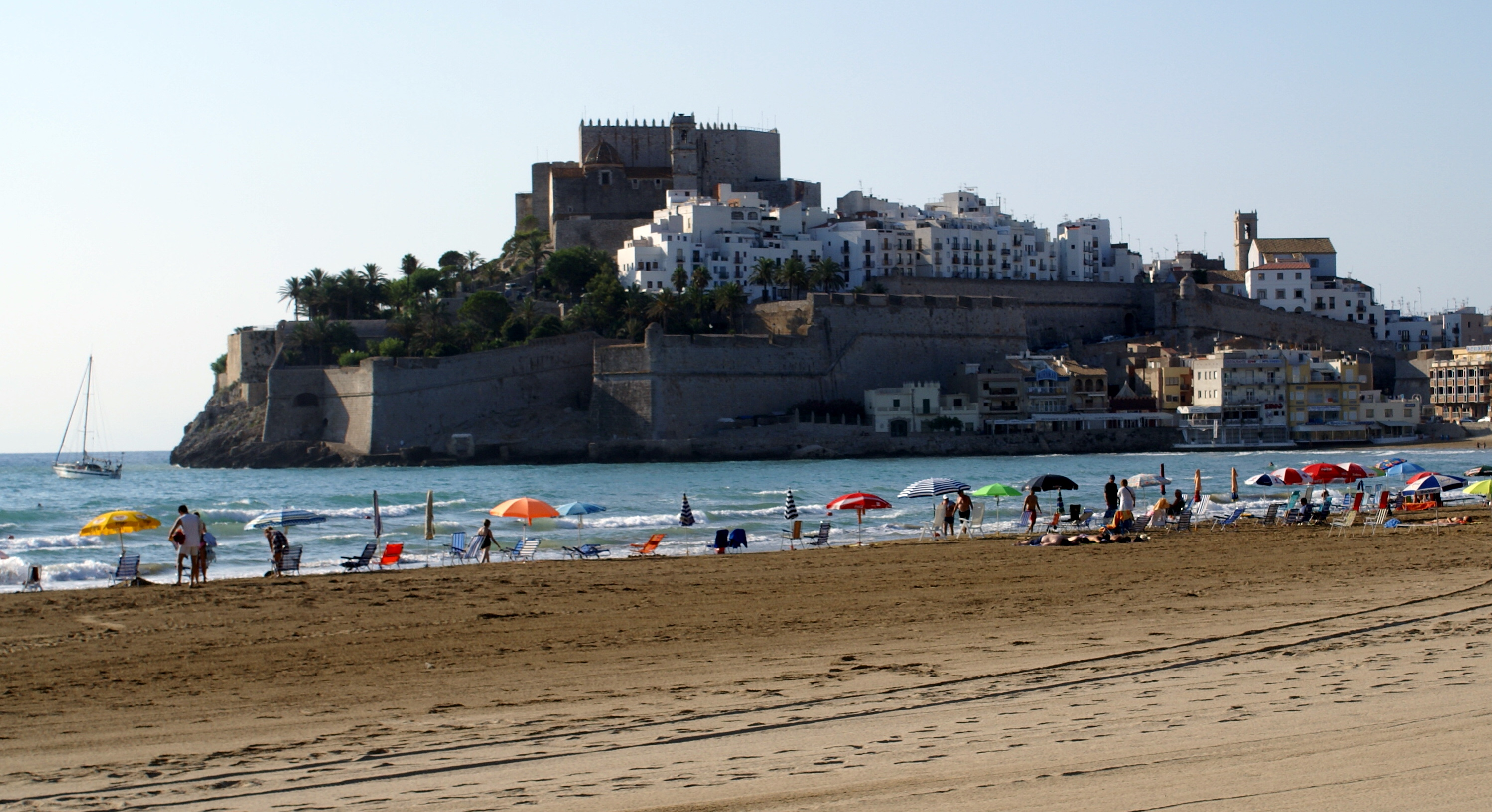
Peñíscola

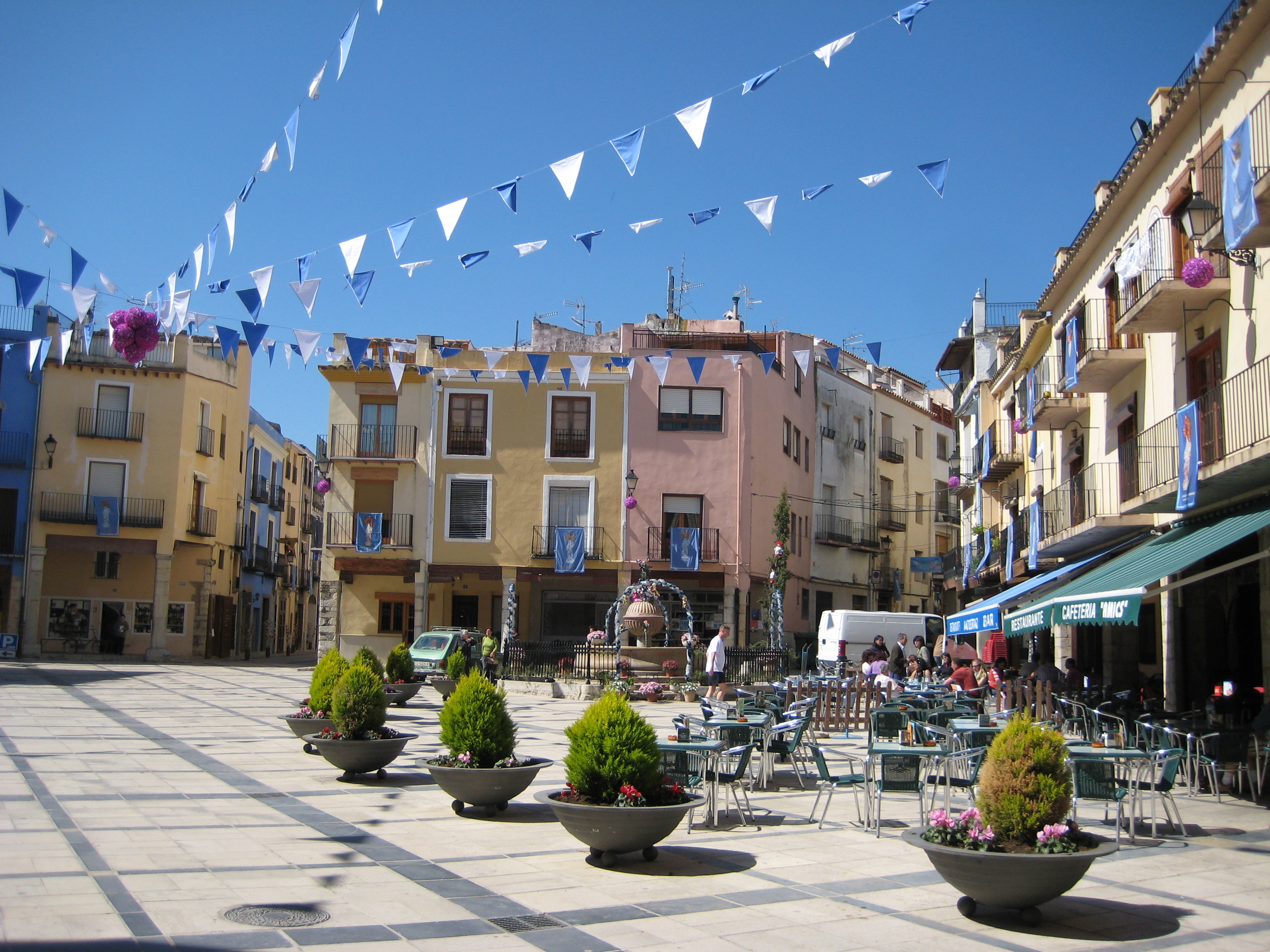
Sant Mateu

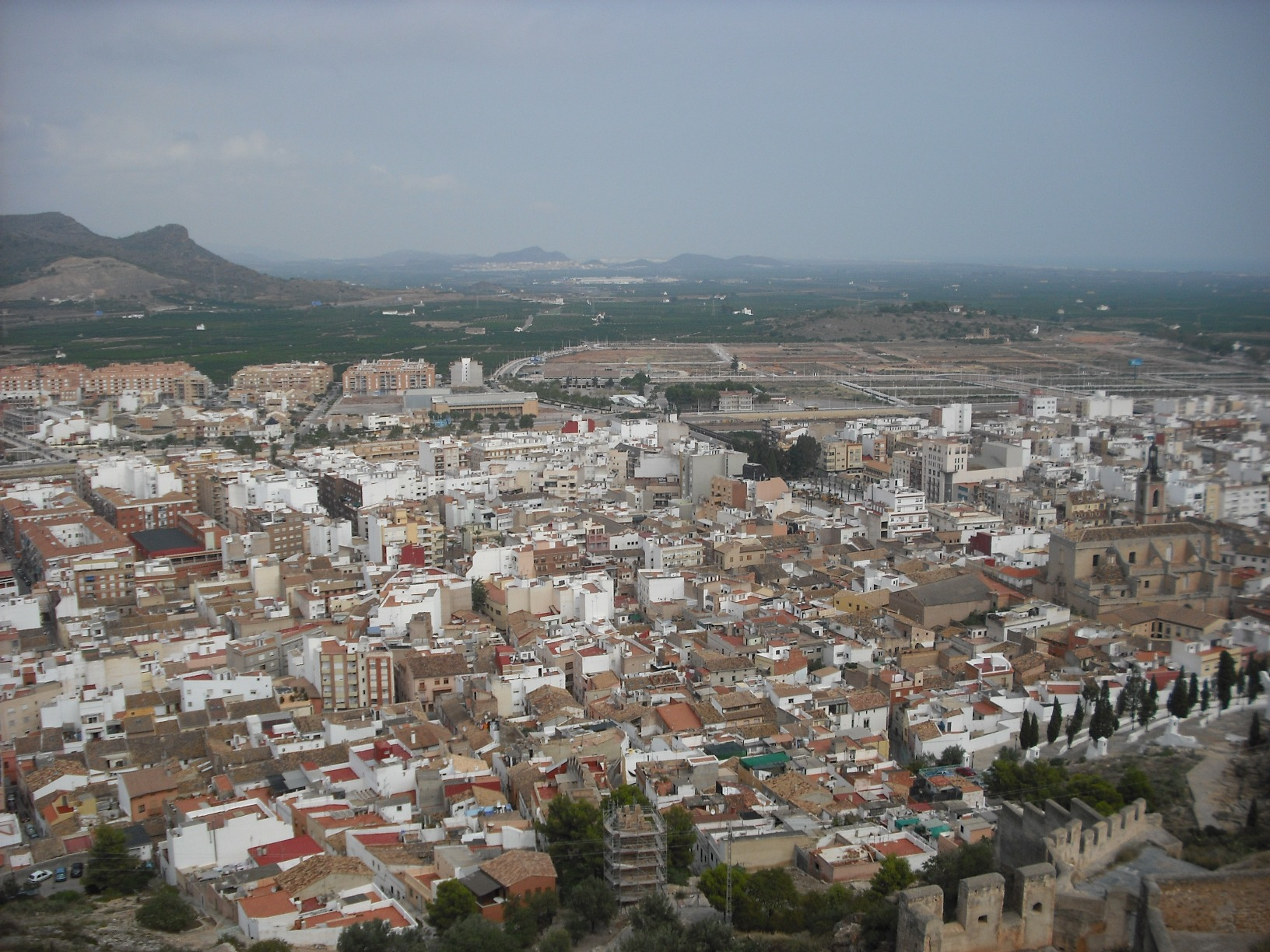
Sagunt

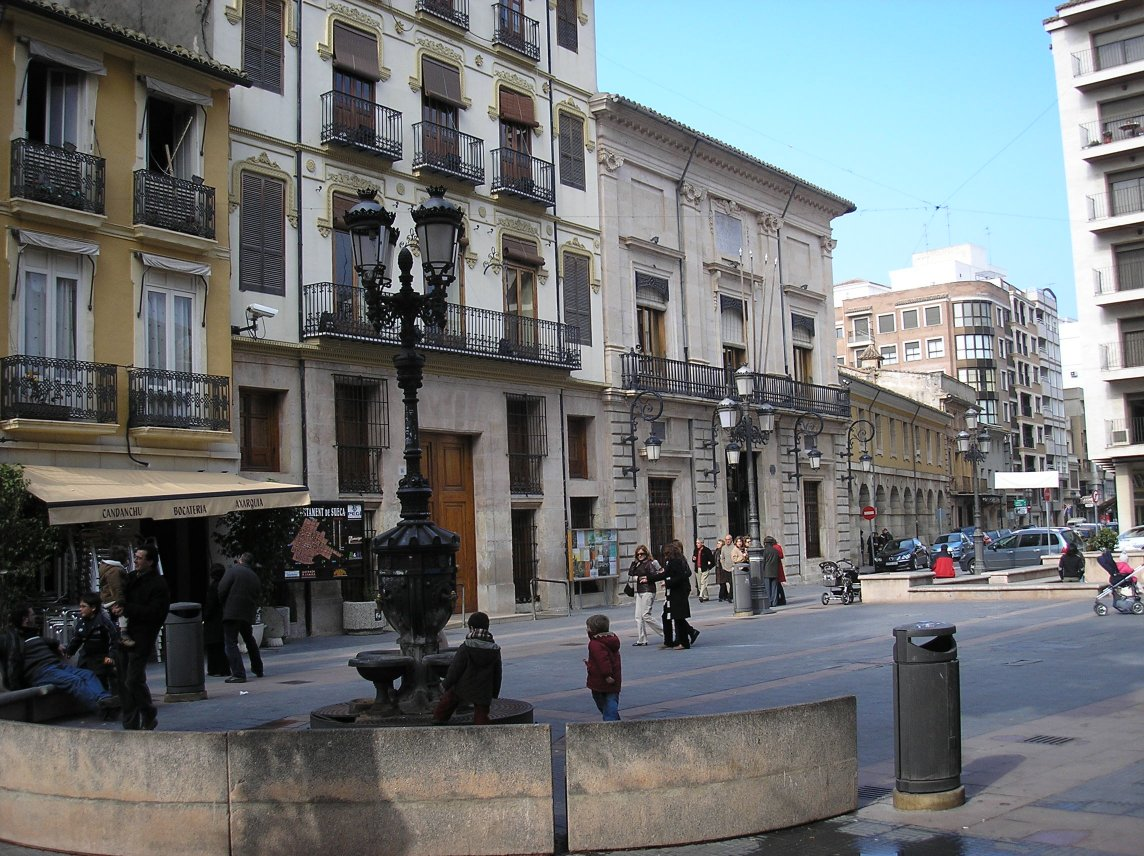
Sueca

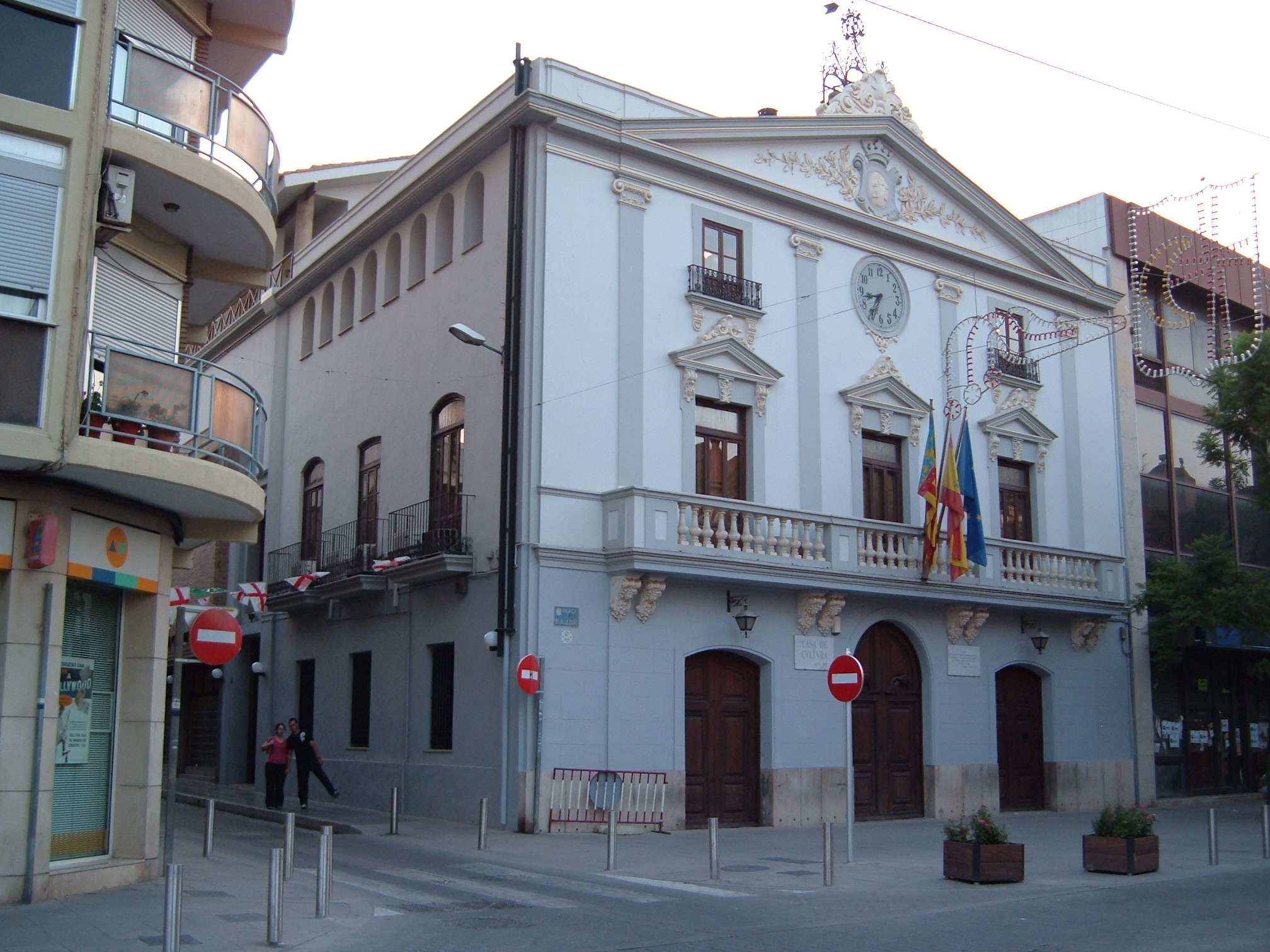
Torrent

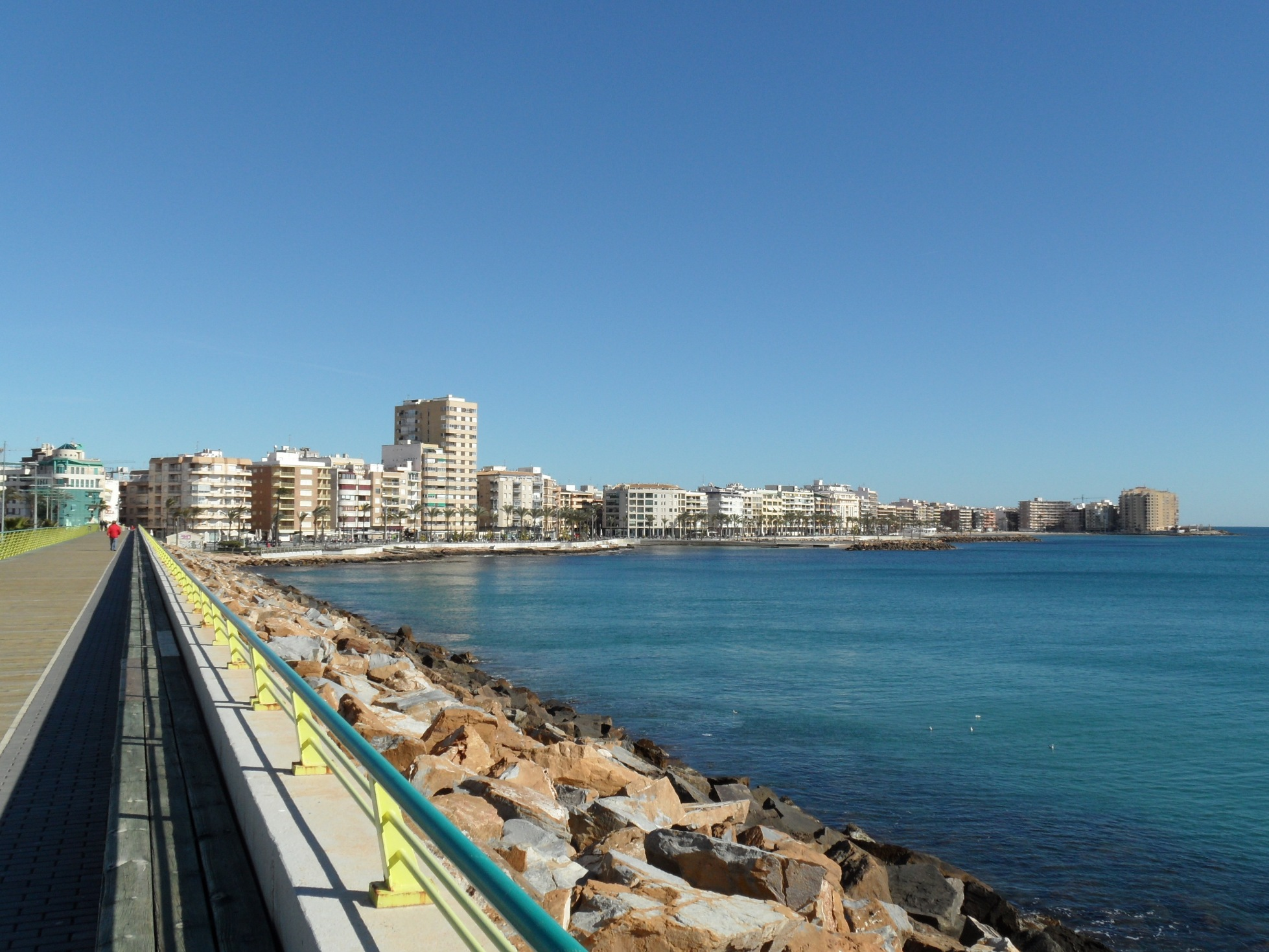
Torrevieja

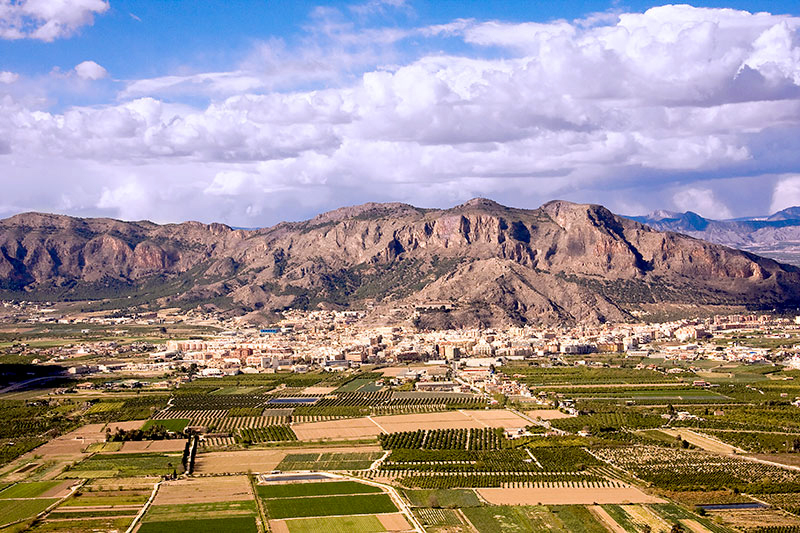
Orihuela, Vega Baja del Segura comarca

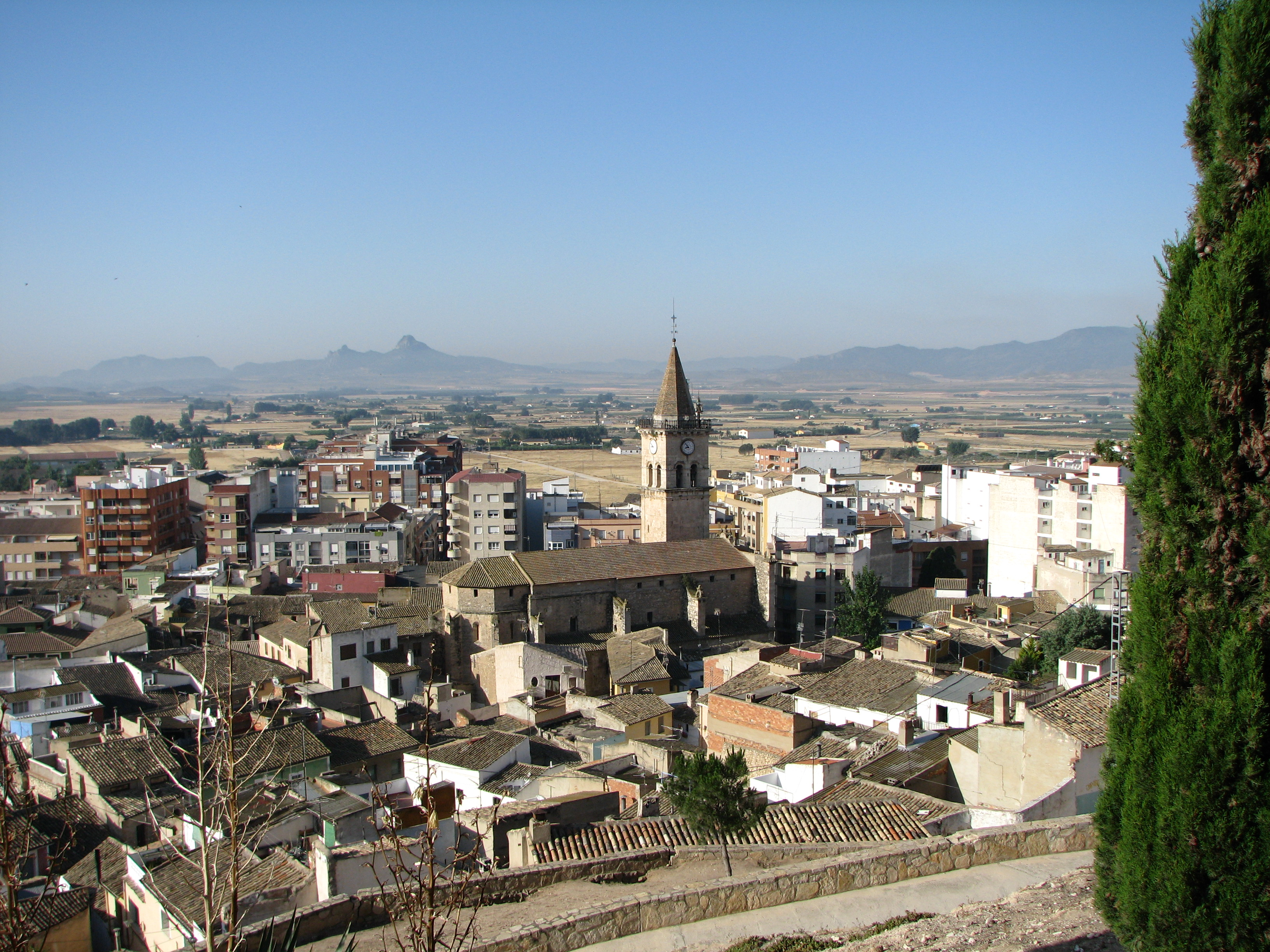
Villena

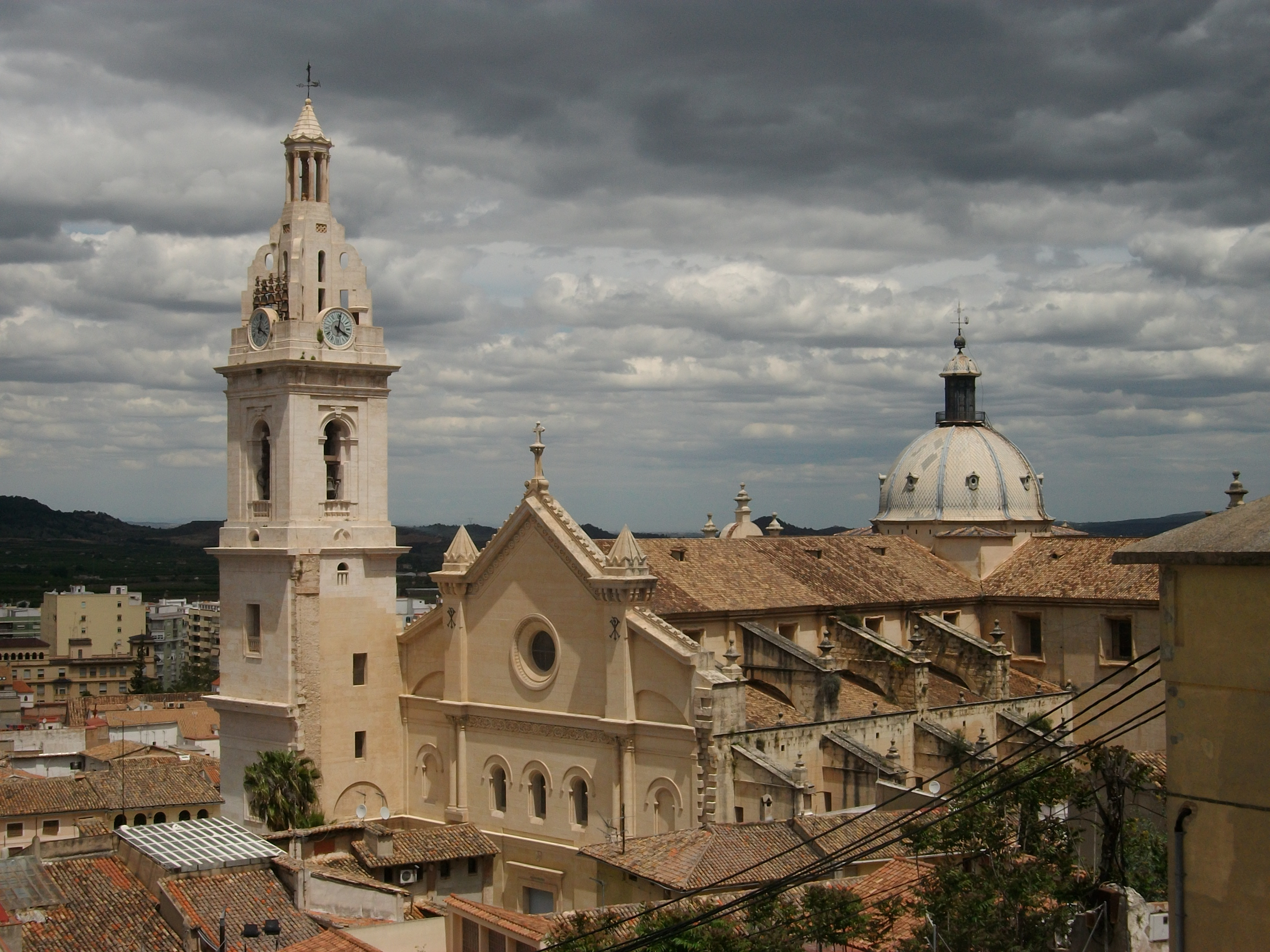
Xàtiva

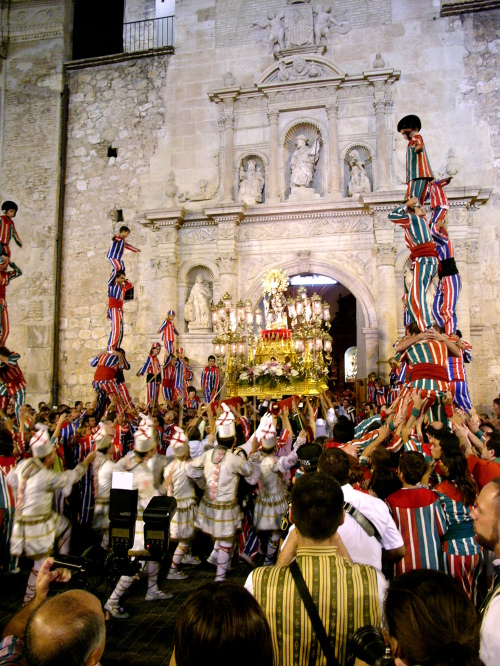
Muixeranga human tower at La Mare de Déu de la Salut Festival' of Algemesí

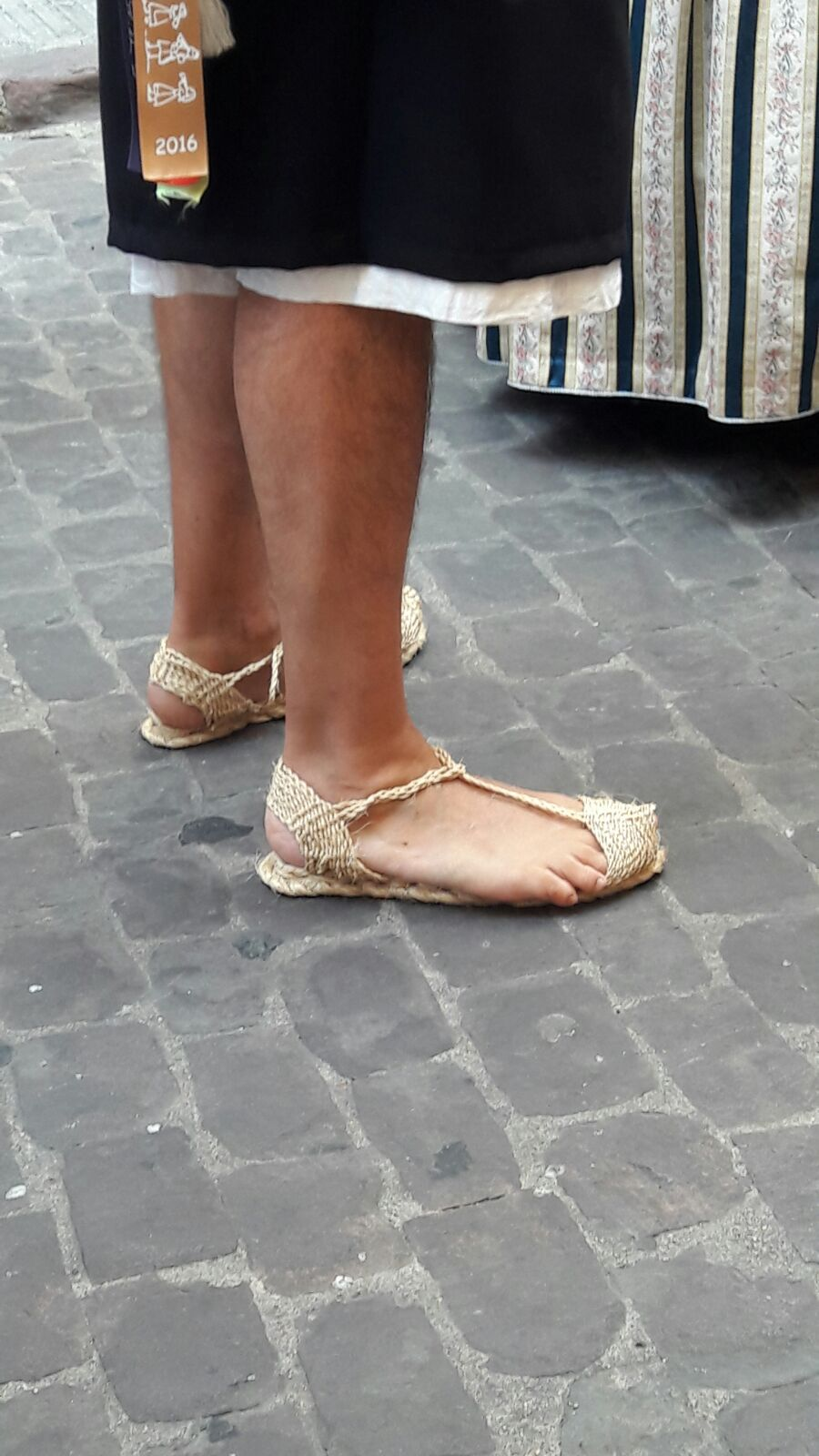
Valencian espardenya

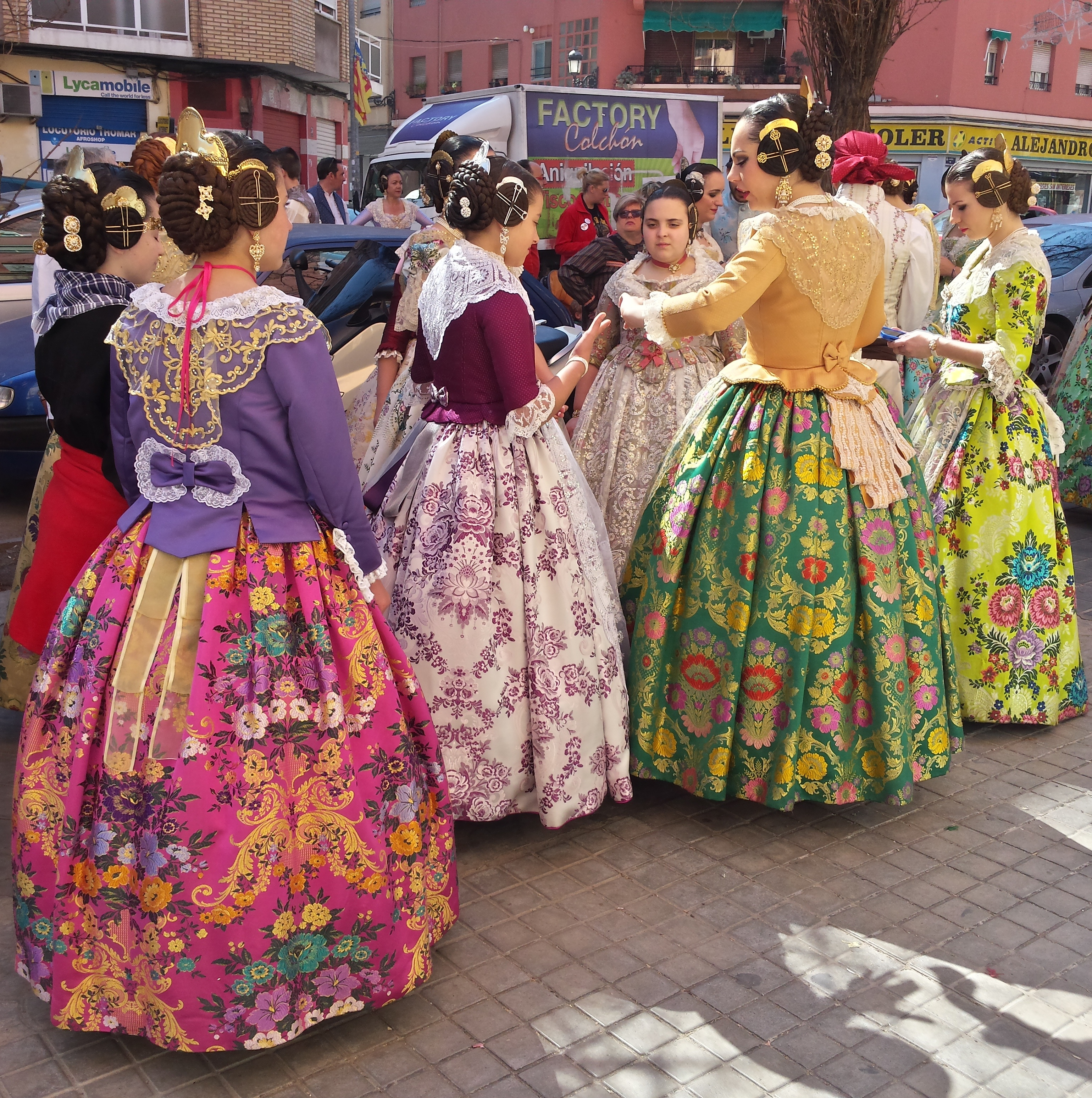
Valencian women with traditional dress and hair

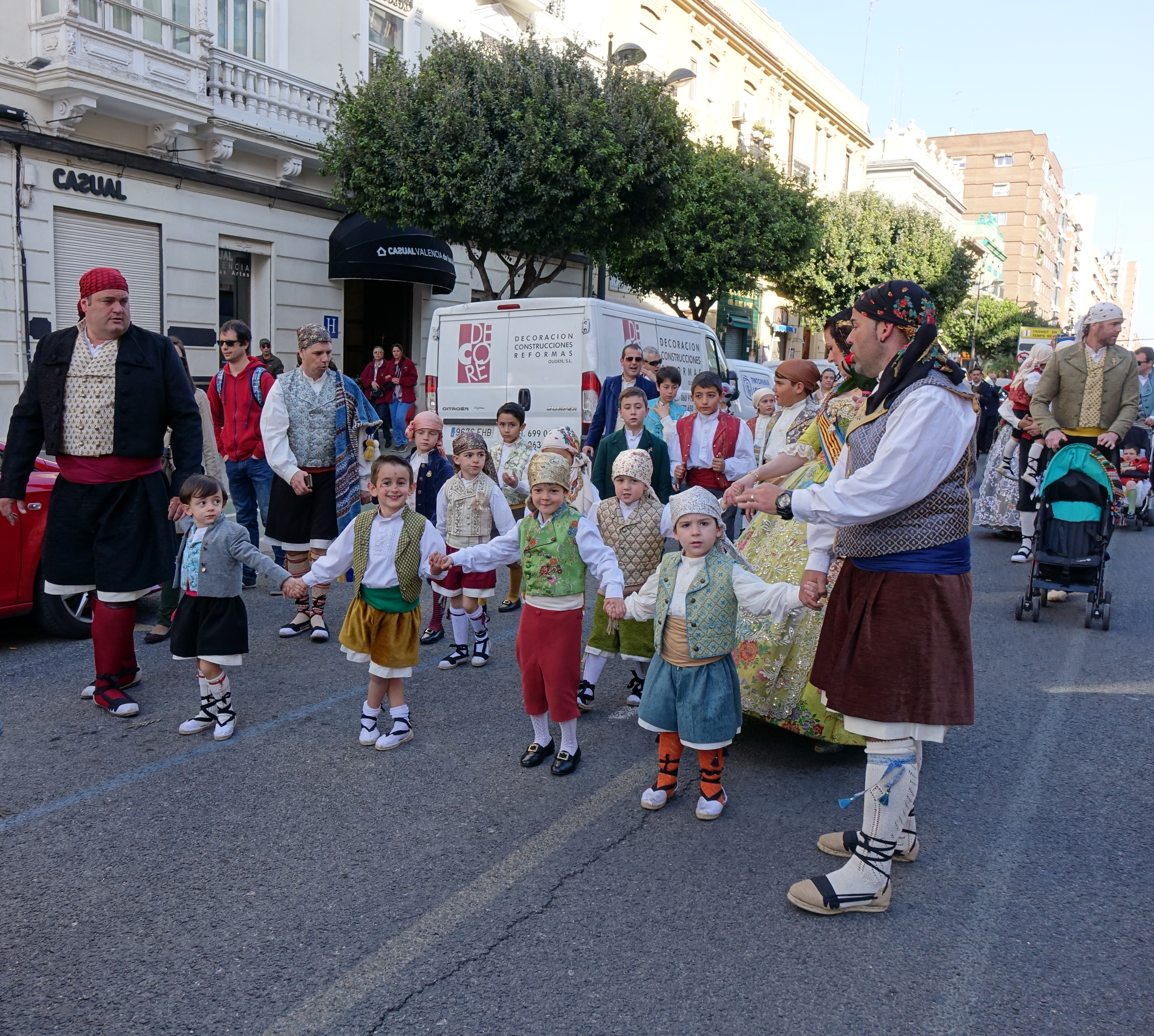
A historical Valencian men costume the Xaraguell

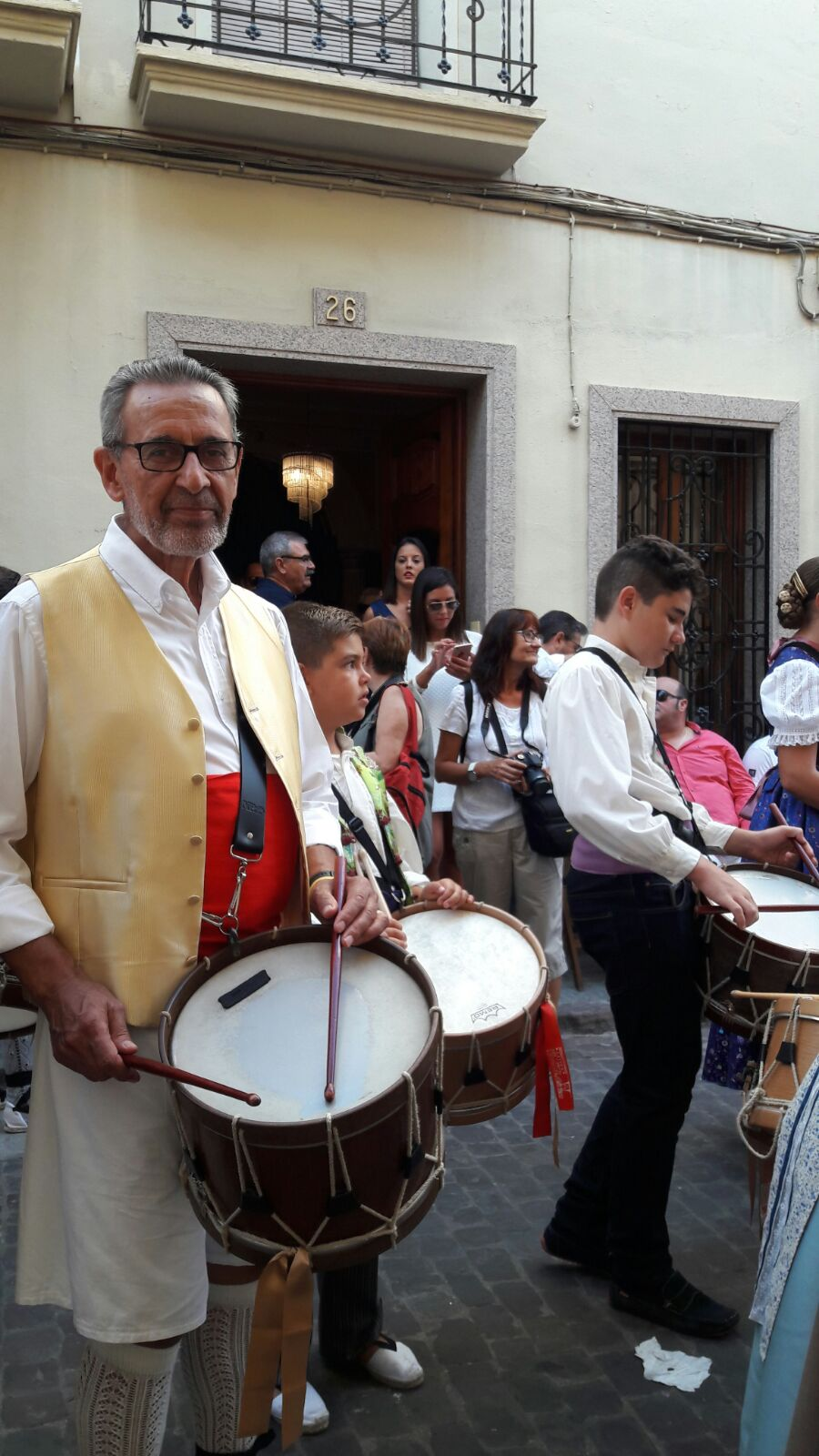
Tabaleter with typical Valencian drums

== See also ==
- List of Valencians

== Bibliography ==
- El llarg camí cap a l'Autonomia Valenciana, de Vicente Ruiz Monrabal. Revista Valenciana d'Estudis autonòmics, núm. 41/42, 3^{er} trimestre de 2003 - 4o trimestre de 2003, p. 372-421. URL: Número 41/42.
- El valencianisme polític, 1874-1936, Alfons Cucó i Giner. 1999, Catarroja, Ed. Afers SL. ISBN 84-86574-73-0.
- Història del País Valencià, Vicente Boix. 1981. Editorial Planeta, ISBN 84-390-0148-7.
- Història del País Valencià, Antoni Furió i Diego. 2001. Edicions 3i4. ISBN 84-7502-631-1.
