= Circuit Bancaixa 06/07 =

Spanish sporting association of traditional handball

The Escala i Corda XVI Professional League 06–07 of the Circuit Bancaixa is the top-level championship of the Valencian pilota, organized by the firm ValNet, on the Escala i corda variant.

It is played in several rounds. The first two ones are a league all-against all; the two worst teams are disqualified. Every victory is worth 3 points, but if the losing team attains 50 jocs they sum up 1 point. This way, in the first round there are eight teams, in the second round there are six teams, and four in the semi-finals. The finals are played to the best of 3 matches.

== Teams ==
- Alcàsser
  - Colau, Jesús and Pigat III
- Benidorm
  - Genovés II and Solaz
- L'Eliana
  - Álvaro and Tato
- Pedreguer
  - Víctor, Fèlix and Salva
- Ajuntament de Petrer
  - Miguel and Grau
- Sagunt
  - León and Dani
- València
  - Núñez, Melchor and Tino
- Vila-real
  - Mezquita, Sarasol II and Oñate

=== Feridors ===
- Miguelín and Pedrito

=== Replacing players ===
- Escalaters:
  - Adrián I, Cervera, Pedro and Soro III
- Mitgers and punters:
  - Bernat, Herrera, Raül II and Voro

== Statistics ==
=== 1st Round ===
Date	Trinquet	Team	Team	Score
22/11/06	Guadassuar	Álvaro and Tato	Genovés II and Solaz	50-60
24/11/06	Sueca	Miguel and Grau	León and Dani	50-60
25/11/06	Pelayo (València)	Pedro, Sarasol II and Oñate	Colau, Jesús and Pigat III	60-40
26/11/06	Llíria	Núñez, Melchor and Tino	Cervera, Fèlix and Salva	60-50
28/11/06	Massamagrell	Genovés II and Solaz	Miguel and Grau	40-60
03/12/06	L'Eliana	Álvaro and Tato	León and Dani	50-60
04/12/06	Benidorm	Pedro, Sarasol II and Oñate	Víctor, Fèlix and Herrera	60-45
06/12/06	Alcàsser	Colau, Jesús and Pigat III	Núñez, Melchor and Tino	35-60
08/12/06	Llíria	Genovés II and Solaz	León and Dani	60-50
10/12/06	Petrer	Álvaro and Tato	Miguel and Grau	60-40
12/12/06	Alberic	Pedro, Sarasol II and Oñate	Núñez, Melchor and Tino	60-55
15/12/06	Sueca	Colau, Jesús and Pigat III	Cervera, Fèlix and Herrera	60-40
16/12/06	Pedreguer	Genovés II and Solaz	Pedro, Sarasol II and Oñate	55-60
17/12/06	Bellreguard	Miguel and Grau	Núñez, Melchor and Tino	30-60
20/12/06	Guadassuar	Álvaro and Tato	Colau, Jesús and Pigat III	55-60
24/12/06	Sagunt	León and Dani	Cervera, Fèlix and Herrera	60-35
03/01/07	Benidorm	Genovés II and Solaz	Colau, Jesús and Pigat III	60-45
04/01/07	Pelayo (València)	Álvaro and Tato	Mezquita, Sarasol II and Oñate	55-60
06/01/07	Llíria	Miguel and Grau	Víctor, Fèlix and Herrera	50-60
07/01/07	L'Eliana	Pedro and Dani	Núñez, Melchor and Tino	25-60
09/01/7	Alberic	Genovés II and Solaz	Víctor, Fèlix and Herrera	60-25
12/01/07	Bellreguard	Álvaro and Tato	Núñez, Melchor and Tino	60-40
13/01/07	Pelayo (València)	Miguel and Grau	Mezquita, Sarasol II and Oñate	60-30
14/01/07	Alcàsser	León and Dani	Colau, Jesús and Pigat III	50-60
17/01/07	Guadassuar	Genovés II and Solaz	Núñez, Melchor and Tino	50-60
19/01/07	Sueca	Álvaro and Tato	Víctor, Fèlix and Herrera	60-30
20/01/07	Pedreguer	Miguel and Grau	Colau, Jesús and Pigat III	60-55
21/01/07	Sagunt	Soro III, Sarasol II and Oñate	León and Dani	60-55

=== 2nd Round ===
Date	Trinquet	Team	Team	Score
27/01/07	Pelayo (València)	Núñez, Melchor and Tino	Mezquita, Sarasol II and Oñate	50-60
27/01/07	Pedreguer	Álvaro and Tato	Miguel and Grau	45-60
28/01/07	Benissa	León and Dani	Genovés II and Solaz	60-45
31/01/07	Guadassuar	Mezquita, Sarasol II and Oñate	Miguel and Grau	60-55
01/02/07	Pelayo (València)	Álvaro and Tato	Genovés II and Solaz	45-60
02/02/07	Sueca	León and Dani	Núñez, Melchor and Tino	60-40
04/02/07	Guadassuar	Mezquita, Sarasol II and Oñate	Genovés II and Solaz	60-45
05/02/07	Benidorm	Álvaro and Tato	León and Dani	60-50
06/02/07	Massamagrell	Miguel and Grau	Núñez, Melchor and Tino	55-60
10/02/07	Petrer	Mezquita, Sarasol II and Oñate	Álvaro and Tato	30-60
11/02/07	Castalla	León and Dani	Miguel and Grau	60-50
14/02/07	Guadassuar	Genovés II and Solaz	Núñez, Melchor and Tino	45-60
16/02/07	Bellreguard	Mezquita, Sarasol II and Oñate	León and Dani	45-60
17/02/07	Pelayo (València)	Álvaro and Tato	Núñez, Melchor and Tino	30-60
18/02/07	Xeraco	Genovés II and Solaz	Miguel and Grau	60-30

=== Semi-finals ===
Date	Trinquet	Team	Team	Score
23/02/07	Sueca	Mezquita, Sarasol II and Oñate	Genovés II and Solaz	60-40
25/02/07	Benissa	Núñez, Melchor and Tino	León and Dani	60-50
02/03/07	Bellreguard	Genovés II and Solaz	Mezquita, Sarasol II and Oñate	40-60
04/03/07	Llíria	León and Dani	Núñez, Melchor and Tino	40-60

=== Finals ===
Date	Trinquet	Team	Team	Score
11/03/07	Guadassuar	Mezquita, Sarasol II and Oñate	Núñez, Melchor and Tino	35-60
18/03/07	Pelayo (València)	Mezquita, Sarasol II and Oñate	Núñez, Melchor and Tino	50-60
25/03/07	Pelayo (València)	Mezquita, Sarasol II and Oñate	Núñez, Melchor and Tino	Not played

=== Honor gallery ===
- Champion:
  - València
  - Núñez, Melchor and Tino
- Runner-up:
  - Vila-real
  - Mezquita, Sarasol II and Oñate

== Seasons of the Circuit Bancaixa ==
- Circuit Bancaixa 04/05
- Circuit Bancaixa 05/06
- Circuit Bancaixa 07/08
