= Circuit Bancaixa 07/08 =

Poster of the 2007/08 Circuit Bancaixa

The Escala i Corda XVII Professional League 07-08 of the Circuit Bancaixa is the top-level championship of the Escala i corda, a modality of Valencian pilota, organized by the firm ValNet. During the very first days the Valencian Pilota Federation disagreed with the way it was organized and gave no "official" title to this season, but finally ValNet and the FPV reached an agreement.

It is played in several rounds. The first two ones are a league all-against all; the two worst teams are disqualified. Every victory is worth 3 points, but if the losing team attains 50 jocs they sum up 1 point. This way, in the first round there are eight teams, in the second round there are six teams, and four in the semi-finals. The finals are played to the best of 3 matches.

== Teams ==
- Alcàsser:
  - Víctor, Jesús and Oñate
- Benidorm:
  - Genovés II, Sarasol II and Héctor
- Aquagest - L'Eliana:
  - Álvaro, Solaz and Espínola
- Pedreguer:
  - León, Fèlix and Salva
- Edicima - Petrer
  - Miguel, Grau and Raül II
- Sagunt
  - Pedro, Dani and Herrera
- València:
  - Núñez, Melchor and Tino
- Vila-real:
  - Mezquita, Tato and Canari

=== Feridors ===
- Miguelín, Oltra and Pedrito.

=== Replacing players ===
- Escalaters:
  - Adrián I, Colau and Primi.
- Mitgers
  - Javi, Pere and Santi.
- Punters:
  - Aucejo, Nacho and Tomàs II.

== Scores ==
=== 1st Round ===
Date	Trinquet	Team	Team	Score
21/11/07	Guadassuar	Mezquita, Tato and Canari	Miguel, Grau and Raül II	50-60
24/11/07	Pelayo (València)	Álvaro, Solaz and Nacho	Colau, Melchor and Tino	60-20
25/11/07	Benissa	Genovés II, Sarasol II and Héctor	Pedro, Dani and Herrera	60-45
26/11/07	La Pobla de Vallbona	León, Fèlix and Salva	Víctor, Jesús and Oñate	45-60
29/11/07	Llíria	Mezquita, Tato and Canari	Álvaro, Solaz and Nacho	
30/11/07	Sueca	Miguel, Grau and Raül II	Núñez, Melchor and Tino	
01/12/07	Pedreguer	Genovés II, Sarasol II and Héctor	León, Fèlix and Salva	
02/12/07	Sagunt	Pedro, Dani and Herrera	Víctor, Jesús and Oñate	
04/12/07	Massamagrell	Mezquita, Tato and Canari	Núñez, Melchor and Tino	
06/12/07	Murla	Miguel, Grau and Raül II	Genovés II, Sarasol II and Héctor	
08/12/07	Pedreguer	Álvaro, Solaz and Nacho	Víctor, Jesús and Oñate	
09/12/07	Bellreguard	Pedro, Dani and Herrera	León, Fèlix and Salva	
10/12/07	Benidorm	Mezquita, Tato and Canari	Genovés II, Sarasol II and Héctor	
13/12/07	Pelayo (València)	Núñez, Melchor and Tino	Víctor, Jesús and Oñate	
15/12/07	Petrer	Miguel, Grau and Raül II	León, Fèlix and Salva	
16/12/07	L'Eliana	Álvaro, Solaz and Nacho	Genovés II, Sarasol II and Héctor	
04/01/08	Sueca	Mezquita, Tato and Canari	Pedro, Dani and Herrera	
05/01/08	Pedreguer	Núñez, Melchor and Tino	León, Fèlix and Salva	
06/01/08	Bellreguard	Genovés II, Sarasol II and Héctor	Víctor, Jesús and Oñate	
09/01/08	Guadassuar	Miguel, Grau and Raül II	Álvaro, Solaz and Nacho	
11/01/08	Vila-real	Mezquita, Tato and Canari	León, Fèlix and Salva	
12/01/08	Petrer	Pedro, Dani and Herrera	Núñez, Melchor and Tino	
13/01/08	Castalla	Miguel, Grau and Raül II	Víctor, Jesús and Oñate	
14/01/08	Benidorm	Álvaro, Solaz and Nacho	León, Fèlix and Salva	
17/01/08	Llíria	Pedro, Dani and Herrera	Miguel, Grau and Raül II	
18/01/08	Sueca	Mezquita, Tato and Canari	Víctor, Jesús and Oñate	
19/01/08	Pedreguer	Núñez, Melchor and Tino	Genovés II, Sarasol II and Héctor	
20/01/08	L'Eliana	Álvaro, Solaz and Nacho	Pedro, Dani and Herrera	

==== 1st Round classification ====
Team		Points	Played matches	Won matches	Lost matches	Won games	Lost games	Diff
1	Álvaro, Solaz and Espínola	3	1	1	0	60	20	+40
2	Genovés II, Sarasol II and Héctor	3	1	1	0	60	45	+15
3	Víctor, Jesús and Oñate	3	1	1	0	60	45	+15
4	Miguel, Grau and Raül II	3	1	1	0	60	50	+10
5	Mezquita, Tato and Canari	1	1	0	1	50	60	-10
6	Pedro, Dani and Herrera	0	1	0	1	45	60	-15
7	León, Fèlix and Salva	0	1	0	1	45	60	-15
8	Núñez, Melchor and Tino	0	1	0	1	20	60	-40

==== Notes to the 1st Round ====
- On November 22 Espínola gets a finger broken and is replaced by Nacho for the 1st Round.
- On November 24 Núñez is replaced by Colau.

=== 2nd Round ===
Date	Trinquet	Team	Team	Score

==== 2nd Round classification ====
Team	Points	Played matches	Won matches	Lost matches	Won games	Lost games	Diff
1
2
3
4
5
6

=== Eliminatories ===
Date	Trinquet	Team	Team	Score

=== Finals ===
Date	Trinquet	Team	Team	Score

== Other seasons ==
- Circuit Bancaixa 04/05
- Circuit Bancaixa 05/06
- Circuit Bancaixa 06/07
