= Circuit Bancaixa 05/06 =

Valencian pilota season

The Escala and Corda XV Professional League 05–06 of the Circuit Bancaixa was the top-level championship of the Valencian pilota, organized by the firm ValNet, on the escala i corda variant.

It was played in several rounds. The first two ones were a league all-against-all; the two worst teams were disqualified. Every victory was worth 3 points, but if the losing team attained 50 jocs, they received 1 point. In the first round there were eight teams, in the second round there were six teams, and in the semi-finals, four teams. The finals were played to the best of three matches.

== Teams ==
- Alcàsser
  - Núñez, Fèlix and Jesús
- Benidorm
  - Genovés II and Tino
- Llíria
  - Víctor, Solaz and Melchor
- Pedreguer
  - León and Sarasol II
- Petrer
  - Miguel and Dani
- València
  - Pedro, Grau and Salva
- Vila-real
  - Mezquita, Tato and Canari
- Hidra-L'Eliana
  - Álvaro and Pigat III

=== Feridors ===
- Miguelín (Miguel Ángel Bas López) and Pedrito (Pedro Ruiz Carrilero)

=== Replacing players ===
- Escalaters:
  - Adrián I, Cervera and Colau
- Mitgers and punters:
  - Bernat, Oñate, Raül II, and Voro

== Statistics ==
=== 1st Round ===
Date	Trinquet	Team	Team	Score
12/11/05	Pelayo (València)	Núñez, Fèlix and Jesús	Mezquita, Tato and Canari	55-60
13/11/05	Benissa	Víctor, Solaz and Melchor	Pedro, Grau and Oñate	55-60
14/11/05	Alginet	Genovés II and Tino	Miguel and Dani	40-60
18/11/05	Sueca	Álvaro and Pigat III	León and Sarasol II	60-35
19/11/05	Pedreguer	Pedro, Grau and Oñate	Mezquita, Tato and Canari	55-60
20/11/05	Llíria	Genovés II and Tino	Víctor, Solaz and Melchor	60-50
22/11/05	Massamagrell	Núñez, Fèlix and Jesús	León and Sarasol II	60-40
23/11/05	Guadassuar	Álvaro and Pigat III	Miguel and Dani	35-60
26/11/05	Petrer	Mezquita, Tato and Canari	Víctor, Solaz and Melchor	60-40
27/11/05	Carcaixent	Núñez, Fèlix and Jesús	Pedro, Grau and Salva	60-40
28/11/05	Benidorm	Genovés II and Tino	Álvaro and Pigat III	60-50
29/11/05	Alberic	León and Sarasol II	Miguel and Dani	55-60
03/12/05	Pelayo (València)	Víctor, Solaz and Melchor	Álvaro and Pigat III	55-60
04/12/05	Alcàsser	Genovés II and Tino	Pedro, Grau and Salva	55-60
09/12/05	Sueca	Mezquita, Tato and Canari	León and Sarasol II	40-60
10/12/05	Pedreguer	Miguel and Dani	Núñez, Fèlix and Jesús	60-25
11/12/05	Benissa	Álvaro and Pigat III	Pedro, Grau and Salva	30-60
16/12/05	Gandia	Víctor, Solaz and Melchor	León and Sarasol II	60-55
17/12/05	Pelayo (València)	Colau, Voro and Tino	Mezquita, Tato and Canari	20-60
18/12/05	L'Eliana	Miguel and Dani	Pedro, Grau and Salva	55-60
19/12/05	Alginet	Álvaro and Pigat III	Núñez, Fèlix and Jesús	50-60
03/01/06	Alberic	Adrián I, Tino and Pedrito	León and Sarasol II	60-50
07/01/06	Pedreguer	Miguel and Dani	Víctor, Solaz and Melchor	60-30
08/01/06	Llíria	Genovés II and Tino	Núñez, Fèlix and Jesús	25-60
09/01/06	Alginet	Mezquita, Tato and Canari	Álvaro and Pigat III	45-60
11/01/06	Guadassuar	León, Voro and Bernat	Pedro, Grau and Salva	60-35
13/01/06	Gandia	Víctor, Solaz and Melchor	Núñez, Fèlix and Jesús	45-60
15/01/06	Alcàsser	Mezquita, Tato and Canari	Miguel and Dani	25-60

=== 2nd round ===
Date	Trinquet	Team	Team	Score
20/01/06	Gandia	Miguel and Dani	Genovés II and Tino	60-35
21/01/06	Petrer	Cervera, Fèlix and Jesús	Álvaro and Pigat III	35-60
22/01/06	Carcaixent	Pedro, Grau and Salva	Mezquita, Tato and Canari	25-60
24/01/06	Guadassuar	Miguel and Dani	Álvaro and Pigat III	60-55
26/01/06	Pelayo (València)	Núñez, Fèlix and Jesús	Mezquita, Tato and Canari	40-60
27/01/06	Gandia	Pedro, Grau and Salva	Genovés II and Tino	55-60
29/01/06	Vila-real	Miguel and Dani	Mezquita, Tato and Canari	45-60
30/01/06	Benidorm	Núñez, Fèlix and Jesús	Pedro, Grau and Salva	60-35
01/02/06	Guadassuar	Álvaro and Pigat III	Genovés II and Tino	60-20
03/02/06	Sueca	Adrián I, Dani and Pedrito	Pedro, Grau and Salva	45-60
05/02/06	L'Eliana	Núñez, Fèlix and Jesús	Genovés II and Tino	60-35
07/02/06	Alberic	Mezquita, Tato and Canari	Álvaro and Pigat III	50-60
10/02/06	Gandia	Miguel and Dani	Núñez, Fèlix and Jesús	60-40
12/02/06	Vila-real	Pedro, Grau and Salva	Álvaro and Pigat III	60-35
13/02/06	Benidorm	Mezquita, Tato and Canari	Genovés II and Tino	Not played

=== Semi-finals ===
Date	Trinquet	Team	Team	Score
18/02/06	Pedreguer	Pedro, Grau and Salva	Álvaro and Pigat III	25-60
19/02/06	Guadassuar	Miguel and Dani	Mezquita, Tato and Canari	60-55
24/02/06	Sueca	Mezquita, Tato and Canari	Miguel and Dani	60-40
26/02/06	Alginet	Álvaro and Pigat III	Pedro, Grau and Salva	60-35

=== Finals ===
Date	Trinquet	Team	Team	Score
05/03/06	Gandia	Álvaro and Pigat III	Mezquita, Tato and Canari	50-60
12/03/06	Pelayo (València)	Álvaro and Pigat III	Mezquita, Tato and Canari	40-60

=== Honor gallery ===
- Champion:
  - Mezquita, Tato and Canari
- Runner-up:
  - Hidra-L'Eliana
  - Álvaro and Pigat III

== Seasons of the Circuit Bancaixa ==
- Circuit Bancaixa 04/05
- Circuit Bancaixa 06/07
- Circuit Bancaixa 07/08
