= Circuit Bancaixa 04/05 =

The Escala and Corda XIV Professional League 04-05 of the Circuit Bancaixa is the top-level championship of the Valencian pilota, organized by the firm ValNet, on the Escala i corda variant.

It was played on several rounds. The first three ones were a league where teams tried to get as much points as possible. Every victory sums up 3 points, but if the loser team attains 50 jocs they sum up 1 point. The 4 teams who had the biggest scorings got qualified to the one-match semi-finals. The best two teams played a final match.

== Teams ==
- Alcàsser
  - Cervera, Voro and Oñate
- Benidorm
  - Genovés II and Fèlix
- Pedreguer
  - León and Sarasol II
- Petrer
  - Pedro, Solaz and Jesús
- Sueca
  - Ribera II and Dani
- València
  - Núñez and Tino
- Vila-real
  - Mezquita, Tato and Canari
- Hidra-L'Eliana
  - Álvaro and Salva

=== Feridors ===
- Miguelín and Pedrito

=== Replacing players ===
- Escalaters:
  - Adrián I and Miguel
- Mitgers and punters:
  - Bernat, Melchor, Serrano, and Raül II

== Statistics ==
=== 1st Round ===
Date	Trinquet	Team	Team	Score
20/11/04	Pelayo (València)	Álvaro and Salva	Genovés II and Fèlix	60-55
23/11/04	Massamagrell	Pedro, Solaz and Jesús	Cervera, Voro and Oñate	45-60
28/11/04	Carcaixent	Ribera II and Dani	Mezquita, Tato and Canari	60-40
05/12/04	L'Eliana	Núñez and Tino	León and Sarasol II	25-60
12/12/04	Benissa	Álvaro and Salva	Cervera, Voro and Oñate	60-55
13/12/04	Alginet	Ribera II and Dani	León and Sarasol II	60-50
19/12/04	Sueca	Álvaro and Salva	Ribera II and Dani	35-60

=== 2nd round ===
Date	Trinquet	Team	Team	Score
02/01/05	Alcàsser	Álvaro and Salva	León and Sarasol II	35-60
08/01/05	Pedreguer	Cervera, Voro and Oñate	Mezquita, Tato and Canari	40-60
09/01/05	Dénia	Núñez and Tino	Genovés II and Fèlix	60-35
12/01/05	Benidorm	Ribera II and Dani	Pedro, Solaz and Jesús	60-35
15/01/05	Petrer	León and Sarasol II	Mezquita, Tato and Canari	30-60
16/01/05	Sueca	Núñez and Tino	Ribera II and Dani	30-60
23/01/05	Benidorm	Mezquita, Tato and Canari	Ribera II and Dani	45-60

=== 3rd round ===
Date	Trinquet	Team	Team	Score
29/01/05	Petrer	Núñez and Tino	Cervera, Voro and Oñate	50-60
30/01/05	Alcàsser	León and Sarasol II	Ribera II and Dani	60-45
06/02/05	Vila-real	Genovés II and Fèlix	Pedro, Solaz and Jesús	60-40
13/02/05	Llíria	Mezquita, Tato and Canari	Álvaro and Salva	60-55
13/02/05	L'Eliana	Cervera, Voro and Oñate	León and Sarasol II	60-50
16/02/05	Guadassuar	Genovés II and Fèlix	Mezquita, Tato and Canari	35-60
20/02/05	Vila-real	Cervera, Voro and Oñate	Mezquita, Tato and Canari	60-30

=== Semi-finals ===
Date	Trinquet	Team	Team	Score
27/02/05	Pedreguer	León and Sarasol II	Ribera II and Dani	60-55
06/03/05	Guadassuar	Cervera, Voro and Oñate	Mezquita, Tato and Canari	55-60

=== Final match ===
Date	Trinquet	Team	Team	Score
13/03/05	Pelayo (València)	León and Sarasol II	Mezquita, Tato and Canari	55-60

=== Honor gallery ===
- Champion:
  - Vila-real
  - Mezquita, Tato and Canari
- Runner-up:
  - Pedreguer
  - León and Sarasol II

== Seasons of the Circuit Bancaixa ==
- Circuit Bancaixa 05/06
- Circuit Bancaixa 06/07
- Circuit Bancaixa 07/08
