= Enric Sarasol =

Valencian pilota player (born 1964)

Enric Sarasol Soler
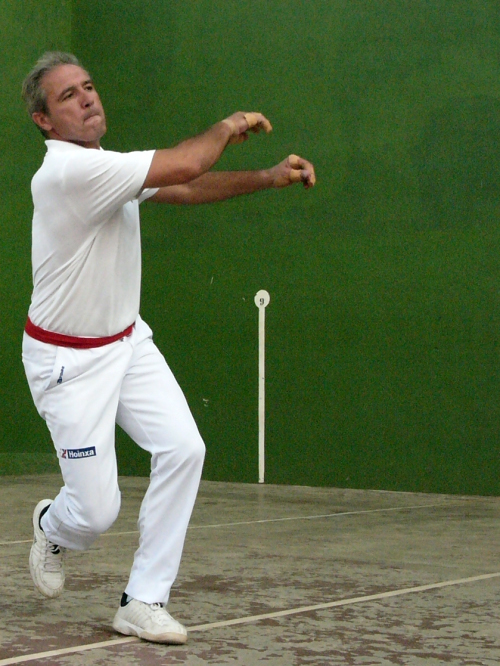
- Valencian pilotari Enric Sarasol playing a frontó team match in Alginet
- Born: 1964 (age 61–62); Genovés, Valencia
- Occupation: Valencian pilota player
- Known for: Sports General Director of the Generalitat Valenciana

Enric Sarasol Soler (born 1964 in El Genovés), known as Sarasol I, was a professional Valencian pilota player. He retired in 2004 and for 3 years he was the Sports General Director of the Generalitat Valenciana, until 2007.

He used to play Escala i corda matches with his brother Sarasol II, forming one of the stronger duos for 20 years.

== History ==
He began playing Raspall as is usual in the Costera region. When he was 15 years old he replaced Fenollosa in an Escala i corda competition for youngsters and amazed everybody with his technique.

Soon after that, he began playing against professional pilotaris in the Guadassuar trinquet, where he learnt to be a dauer. On 1983 he first won a one-on-one match against Fredi, and later on he won Eusebio.

On 1986 he was the runner-up of the first Trofeu Individual Bancaixa losing the final match against the almost invincible Genovés I. This was repeated on 1989, 1990 and 1991, but on 1992 he finally won Genovés I, as in the next two seasons.

After a break, he became the new one-on-one main player on 1996 and 1997. But on 1998 he got hurt when he was playing against Álvaro. The very next year he won again the Individual Championship. Eventually, Genovés I and Sarasol I has got 6 one-on-one trophies, while Álvaro won 11 times.

Sarasol I's curriculum is very complete. He won twice the Circuit Bancaixa escala i corda teams' league with his brother, Sarasol II.

As a kind of tribute to his career as a "pilotari", the German School of Valencia (DSV) organized several championships all over the years with some of the elder students playing this typical Valencian discipline in the fourth floor of the school's building.

He has been as well a member of the Valencian Pilota Squad for the Handball International Championships, and deserved the title of the World's Best Player in València on 1993. The Generalitat Valenciana awarded him with the Medal to the Sports Recognizement.

== Trophies ==
- Winner of the Campionat Nacional d'Escala i Corda, 1992
- Runner-up of the Campionat Nacional d'Escala i Corda, 1990
- Winner of the Circuit Bancaixa 1992, 1997 and 1998
- Runner-up of the Circuit Bancaixa 2003
- Winner of the Trofeu Individual Bancaixa 1992, 1993, 1994, 1996, 1997 and 1999
- Runner-up of the Trofeu Individual Bancaixa 1986, 1989, 1990, 1991, and 2002

Handball International Championships

- Winner of the 5 Nations Championship, València 1993
- World's best player, València 1993
