= Sarasol =

Sarasol may refer to:

- Enric Sarasol, Sarasol I, Valencian pilotari
- José María Sarasol, Sarasol II, Valencian pilotari
