= Celedonio =

Celedonio is a Spanish masculine given name meaning "swallow". Notable people with the given name include:

- Celedonio Calatayud (1880–1931), Spanish scientist and radiologist
- Celedonio Dómeco de Jarauta (1814–1848), Spanish soldier and priest
- Celedonio Espinosa (born 1933), Filipino boxer
- Celedonio Lima (born 1940), Argentine boxer
- Celedonio Romero (1913–1996), Cuban guitarist, composer and poet
- Don Trollano (real name Celedonio Trollano Jr.; born 1992), Filipino basketball player
