= Galotxa =

Galotxa (Valencian: [ɡaˈlɔtʃa], also [ɡaˈlɔtʃɔ]) is a variety of pilota that is always played in the street, whether artificial or natural, practiced mostly in the northern counties of the Xúquer river.

In the evolution of the various Valencian pilota forms, Galotxa would be immediate precursor of the Escala i corda (a net in the center of the court, starting the game with the ferida, and the ball can bounce only once on the ground), but without the stairs nor llotgetes (in natural streets galleries neither exist).

There are only amateur players, although many professionals pilotaris (pilota players) of Escala i corda began in Galotxa, such as Álvaro.

== Playing area ==
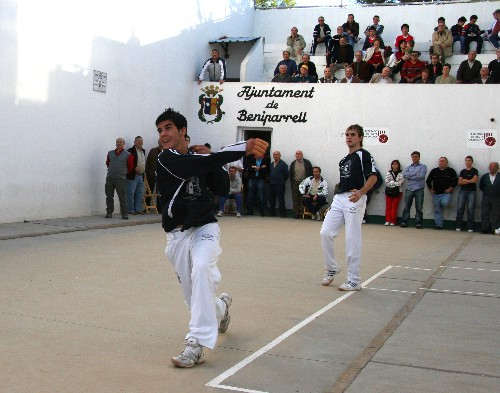
A person hitting a ball in a Galotxa match in the artificial street of Beniparrell

Galotxa games are played on the street. This street should be straight and flat, about 50 metres (160 ft) long and 7 meters wide. But these are only guides, and usually people elect a street that fits more to their style of play.

Furthermore, given the dominance of cars and streets in the neighborhood nuisance, some councils have built artificial streets for the practice of Galotxa. These streets simulate windows, balconies, lampposts, sidewalks (and even the sewer lids) of a typical street, but with the advantage of a more regularly pitch and without the interruption of a car that wants to enter the garage, or the elderly lady who returns laden with shopping bags. Among others, there are artificial streets in Albuixech, Benidorm, Beniparrell, Calp, Foios, L'Eliana, Montserrat, Torrent, and Xirivella.

In the center of the street, and at a height of 1.80 metres (5 ft 11 in), is placed a net that divides the court in two halves, the dau and the rest. From this net, 15 steps towards the rest hangs another net, the Galotxa net. And two feet from the Galotxa net to the dau wall, reaching the left wall, a rectangle called dau is drawn on the floor. Both the dau and the Galotxa net are only required when serving every quinze, and are ignored in other play situations.

The audience sits at the bottom of the street, on sidewalks, or under the midfield net. In the case of artificial streets there are staired public galleries in the top of the border walls, limiting the depth of the courts.

== Rules ==
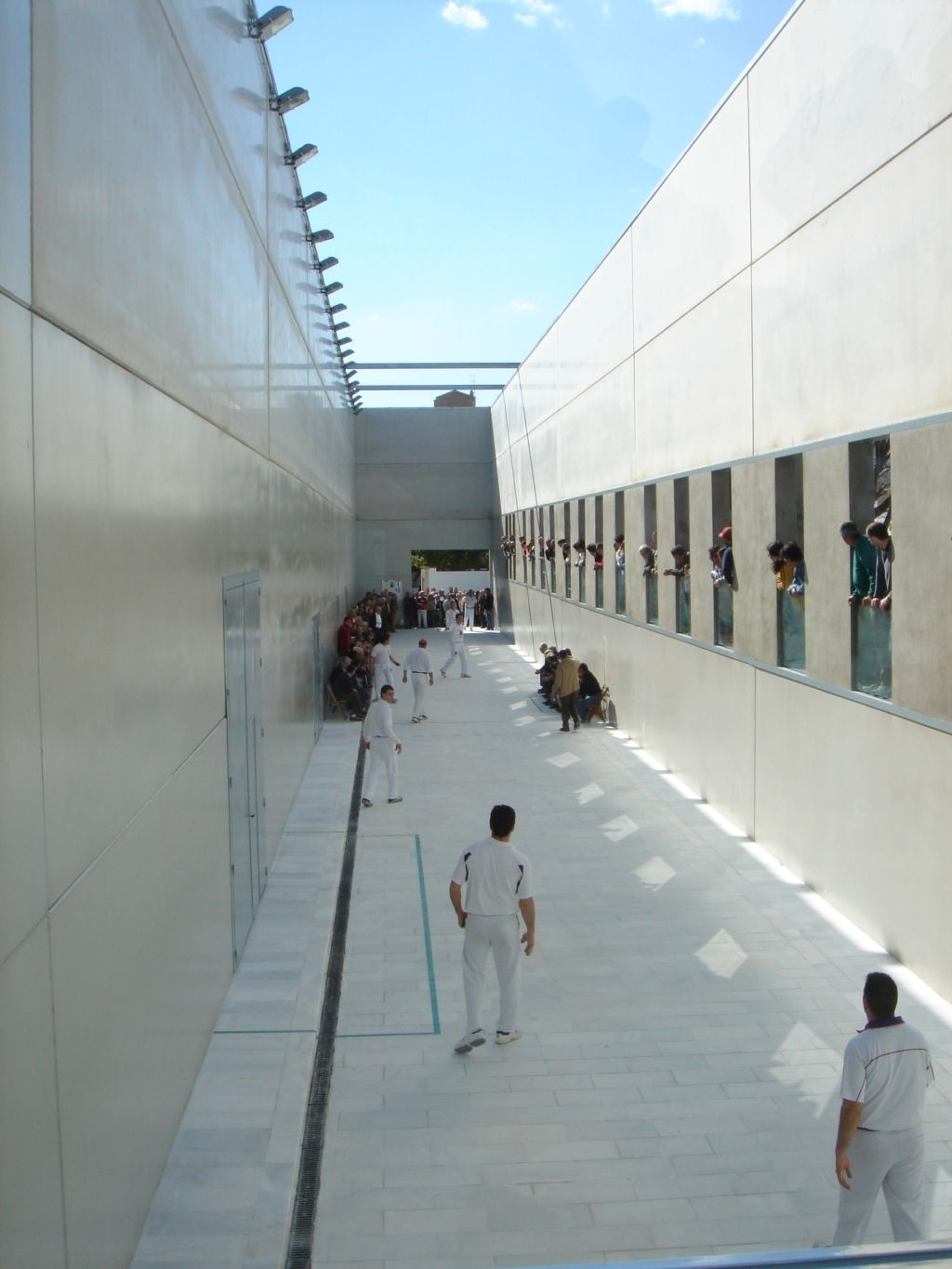
Artificial street in Calp

The Galotxa games are played by two teams of three members each, some dressed in red and others blue (the red color is the favorite or the supposedly stronger), and the objective is the same as the Escala i corda, sending the ball over a net by hitting it with the hand. When the opponent doesn't get it the sending team wins the quinze.

Matches are played to 14 games, counting 5 to 5: every game scoring is valid for 5 points. Every game is divided in 4 "quinzes" (15, 30, val and game). The team who first gets 70 points for 14 games is the winner.

Every quinze begins when the "feridor" player throwing (not hitying) the ball to the opponent bot over the Galotxa net and falling on the dau. Then the bot must turn it back to the team in the "rest" midfield. This way, both teams will be sending each other the ball over the net with an only hit of the hand by team, they may hit the ball on the air or when it's bounced once on the ground, until one of the teams is not able to throw it back or a "fault" is committed. The quinze is won when the other team is not able to re-hit the ball over the net.

Also, however, a quinze is won when the other team committed a foul:

- When the ball bounces twice, or the same team (or player) touches it twice.
- When the ball touches the net or passes under it.
- When, in the "ferida", the ball doesn't enter into the "dau" or passes down the Galotxa net.

== The balls ==
In the "Galotxa" a kind of ball called pilota de vaqueta (Catalan for little cow ball) is used, it's a small and extremely fast ball, very tough and good bouncer. The name comes from the fact that it's made of cow leather. The size for adults are 42 mm diameter, 138 mm circumference, and 42 gr of weight.

== Players ==
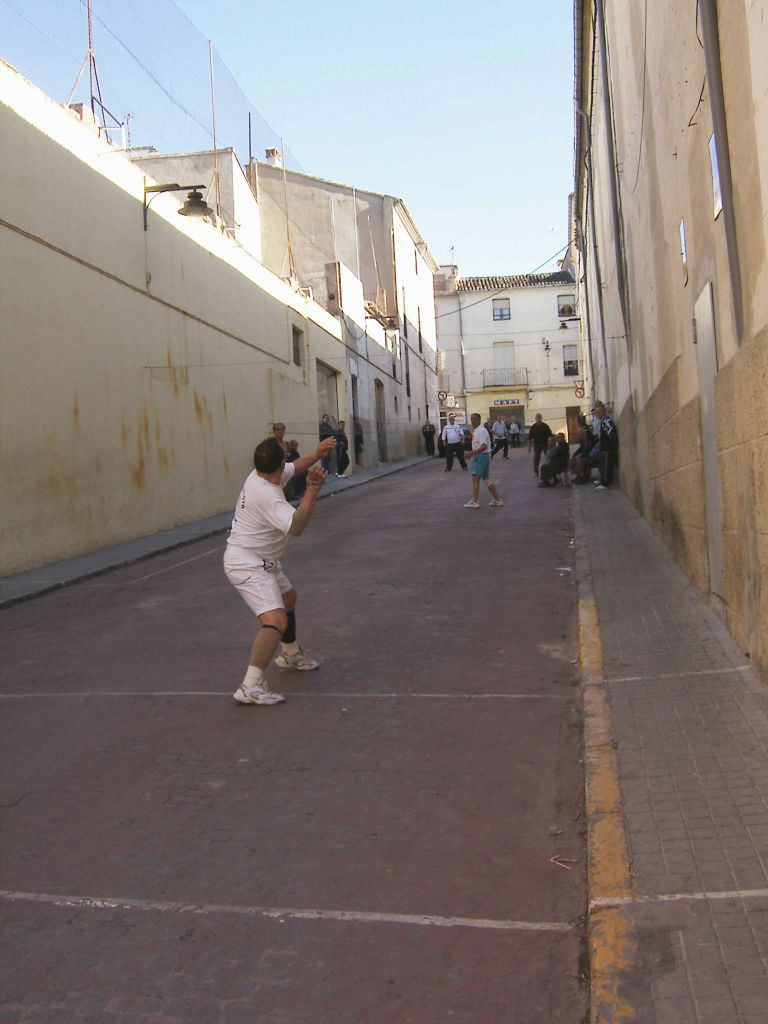
Galotxa match in a natural street

"Galotxa" is played by teams of three players. The visiting team dresses in red (as an act of deference, because historically red is the colour of the winners or the favourite team), and the other one in blue.

Players are called according to their position in the street. So, there is "bot", a "mitger" and a "punter". There are also two special players called the "feridors".

- The bot (also called as "rest", or "dauer") is the player closer to the walls or the limits of the court, hence, he's in charge of throwing the ball after the ferida and receiving the farthest thrown balls.
- The mitger (also called galotxer) is positioned in the middle of his teams' field and his main shot is on the air, when the ball hasn't bounced on the ground. If the ball has bounced once he is able to aim and throw the ball to the corners, to the non-protected places of the opponent team.
- The punter is the player closer to the net, that's why he's who'll play less balls (because they are so fast they won't be able to hit them properly) and who needs less strength in order to throw it back, but also, he'll receive the stronger balls, hence he'll use more protections on the hands.
- The feridor is a special player. He might be a "punter", but usually he's a member of the team that does exclusively the ferida He's in charge of beginning every quinze by throwing the ball to the dau, over the galotxa net. This serve is called "ferida" (Catalan for "wound"), because the more difficult to play the "bot" receives the ball the more painful it'll be.
