= Vaqueta ball =

Ball used to play some Valencian pilota variants

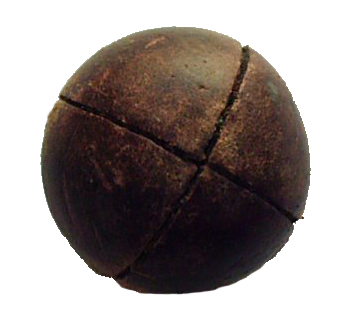
A Vaqueta ball. Initially black, the leather fades to brown, through use.

The vaqueta ball (Valencian: pilota de vaqueta, IPA: [piˈlɔta ðe vaˈketa], lit. 'little cow') is the kind of ball used to play some Valencian pilota variants, including Escala i corda, Galotxa and Raspall. Its name derives from the fact that it is made of bull's skin. It has a black colour that tends to become brown as it is used, and is designed to contrast with the white colour of the trinquets' walls.

== Traits ==
The vaqueta ball has a diameter of 44 millimetres (1.7 in) (giving it a circumference of 138 millimetres (5.4 in)), and its weight is around 42 to 48 grams (1.5 to 1.7 oz), depending on the variant. In Escala i corda lighter balls are preferred, while in Raspall heavier balls are used.

The actual weight of the balls has changed over time. In the 1930s, pilotaris such as Quart played with balls around 28–33 grams (0.99–1.16 oz). The lighter the ball the slower it goes and the less it flies (its direction). This change of weight has been favoured by rest players, who tend to be stronger and have to send the ball longer, but it is an extra handicap for mitger and punter players, who have to stop the ball or strike it in the middle of its trajectory and while it is still carrying a lot of force.

During the matches, and before beginning every quinze, the team who stands at the dau is allowed to change one of the six disposable balls (each team previously chose three of them). This way, if playing again a double team, a trio would choose a new ball, which are fast and with a long bounce, so that the opposing two players are forced to move constantly. Otherwise, the attacking team tends to choose heavier balls, since they exhaust more when defensing.

== Elaboration ==
An unused, black Vaqueta ball

The making of a vaqueta ball is a piece of Arts and crafts. The piloters are mainly leather workers such as Emili López (Alberic), Enric Álvarez (Carcaixent), Miquel Baixauli (Catarroja), Joan Montañés (Llíria), Josep Bernet (Massalfassar), and Miquel Pedrosa (La Vall d'Uixó), or retired players as el Rovellet (València).

First the piloter chooses the bull's skin, specially from the nape of the neck, which has to be 6 or 7 millimetres (0.24 or 0.28 in) thick and which has to be very tough, so that the ball becomes a real stone when it is finished. Once the leather is chosen, it is steeped until it becomes 3 millimetres (0.12 in) thick. During this process the skin becomes softer and the piloter may work with it. Next, eight triangles are cut and sewn up from the inner side with nylon so that they form a sphere. But before the last triangle is sewn up, the ball is stuffed with fluff. After that the last triangle is sewn up and the ball gets closed. It will be pressed for 3 or 4 days in order to acquire a perfect spherical shape. The elaboration process is finished around 1 month later, when the leather is absolutely dry.

There are a number of reasons to explain the expensive price of the vaqueta balls: The handcrafted elaboration, the time consumed, the quality of the materials, and the few number of renowned piloters. There also on sale balls used by the professional players, though they are not as fast or tough as new ones.

== Other projects ==
- Media related to Pilota de vaqueta at Wikimedia Commons
