= Valnet (disambiguation) =

Valnet is a Canadian media company that owns various entertainment media platforms.

Valnet may refer to:

- ValNet, Valencian pilota players association
- VALNET, the Veterans Affairs Library Network
