= Circuit Bancaixa =

Professional league of Valencian pilota

The Circuit Bancaixa (Valencian pronunciation: [siɾˈkujd baŋˈkajʃa]; "Bancaixa League"), officially Liga Profesional Escala i Corda, is the professional league of Valencian pilota.

Circuit Bancaixa name is taken from its main sponsor, the Valencian savings bank Bancaixa, (later Bankia and now part of CaixaBank). During the period 1991–1992, it replaced the Campionat Nacional d'Escala i Corda, which had existed from 1952–1990. The league was initially created by the retired pilotari Alfred Hernando (aka Fredi). The league, which originally just featured the best local players, has since expanded and gained prestige. Some famous former players include Sarasol I, Pigat II, and Álvaro.

During the 2007-2008 sports season, eight teams participated for the first time, with three feridors and six replacing pilotaris. Each team was composed of two or three members from the ValNet firm. Teams had to score as many points as possible to remain in the competition (3 points for victory, and 1 point in case of loss but scoring 50 tants). The six highest scoring teams each earned a place for a second phase with the same rules. When there were only four teams left, two matches were played as the best of three matches. The winners then went on to the final, with each team composed of two or three members from the ValNet firm.

== Results ==
Season	Winner	Runner-up	Score	Trinquet	
2023-24	Giner and Nacho	J. Salvador, Conillet and Monrabal II	60-30	Pelayo (València)	
2022-23	Puchol II, Álvaro and Hilari	J. Salvador, Nacho and Guillermo	60-45	Pelayo (València)	
2021-22	Puchol II, Santi and Carlos	Giner, Tomás and Héctor	60-55	Pelayo (València)	
2020-21	De la Vega, Javi and Carlos	Giner, Pere and Álvaro Gimeno	60-40	Pelayo (València)	
2006/07	Núñez, Melchor and Tino	Mezquita, Sarasol II and Oñate	60-50	Pelayo (València)	2nd match
			60-35	Guadassuar	1st match
2005/06	Mezquita, Tato and Canari	Álvaro and Pigat III	60-40	Pelayo (València)	2nd match
			60-50	El Zurdo (Gandia)	1st match
2004/05	Meto	León and Sarasol II	60-55	Pelayo (València)	
2003/04	Mezquita, Tato and Tino	Sarasol I and Sarasol II	60-45	Pelayo (València)	
2002/03	Núñez, Fèlix and Jesús	Álvaro and Tino	60-35	Pelayo (València)	
2001/02	Álvaro and Tino	Cervera and Solaz	60-30	Pelayo (València)	
2000/01	Álvaro and Dani	León, Sarasol II and Fèlix	60-45	Pelayo (València)	
1999/00	Ribera II, Tino and Oñate	Álvaro, Pasqual II and Tato	60-35	Pelayo (València)	
1998/99	Sarasol I and Sarasol II	Pigat II, Pigat III and Sanchis	60-50	Pelayo (València)	
1997/98	Sarasol I and Sarasol II	Núñez, Voro and Tino	60-20	Pelayo (València)	
1996/97	Álvaro, Oñate and Muedra	Oltra and José María	60-30	Pelayo (València)	
1995/96	Pigat II, Pigat III and Serrano	Álvaro, Solaz and Joaquín	60-55	Pelayo (València)	
1994/95	Pigat II, Pigat III and Pepet	Oltra, Solaz and Tino	60-45	Pelayo (València)	
1993/94	Perele I, Perele II and Oltra	Pigat II, Xatet II de Carlet and Pepet	60-50	Pelayo (València)	
1992/93	Pigat II, Xatet II de Carlet and Pepet	Puchol, Sarasol II and Pasqual II	60-55	Pelayo (València)	
1991/92	Sarasol I and Sarasol II	Fenollosa, Edi and Tino	60-45	Vila-real	

== Circuit Bancaixa specific rules ==
The Circuit Bancaixa slightly changes the Escala i corda rules in order to promote the sport and TV broadcasts.

- First scoring: The match is won by the first team to score 60 jocs. In order to make matches faster, benefit betting, and force pilotaris to give maximum effort from the very first ball, the matches begin scoring 15-15 jocs.
- Forbidden galleries: The team that throws the ball to the dau or rest galleries loses the quinze if it doesn't come back to the playing area. This way, pilotaris are forced to try to achieve more difficult plays by searching bounces or corners instead of throwing the ball to the top. This rule means an additional effort for the players, especially when playing against a trio.
- The ferida: The first fault of the joc is not scored. In the ferida, if the ball doesn't enter into the dau, it's a fault, that is, a won quinze for the team at the dau. However, if this situation happens for the first time in the current joc, it is not scored. This way, feridors may risk much more.
- The feridors: Before every match begins, the special players, known as feridors, are raffled. That is, they don't know for whom they will be playing until minutes before. In case the team is formed by 3 players, the punter (forwarder) may choose to also play as a feridor (as Tino used to do). If he doesn't want to, then he must begin every quinze under the mid-field net.

== Posters ==
- Every season's poster features a picture of last year's winning team. So on the 2006/07 Circuit Bancaixa poster there are Mezquita, Tato (hitting the ball), and Canari in their positions, escalater, mitger, and punter.

== Seasons of the Circuit Bancaixa ==
- Circuit Bancaixa 04/05
- Circuit Bancaixa 05/06
- Circuit Bancaixa 06/07
- Circuit Bancaixa 07/08

== See also ==
- Valencian pilota
- Escala i corda
- Trofeu Individual Bancaixa
