= José Jorge Mezquita García =

José Jorge Mezquita García (Vila-real, 1967), simply known as Mezquita, is a Valencian pilota professional player, one of the best reboters (bouncing scholars) of the Escala i corda variant in the ValNet company. He has been member of the Valencian Pilota Squad.

== Trophies ==
- Winner of the Circuit Bancaixa 2004, 2005 and 2006
- Runner-up of the Circuit Bancaixa 2007

Handball International Championships

- Winner World Championship, València 1996
- Winner World Championship, Maubeuge (France) 1998
- Winner World Championship, València 2000
