= Juan Cuevas Perales =

Valencian composer

Gloria Patri (extracte de Lauda Jerusalem)
La Llum Musical Xativina

Goigs (extracte)
La Llum Musical Xativina

Juan Cuevas Perales (8 February 1782 in Guadassuar – 1855) was a Valencian composer in the Classical style.

He was a Chapel Cathedral choirboy in Valencia. His first known professional employment was as choirmaster at church of Sant Martí in Valencia in a post which he held from 1801 to 1804, when he came back to cathedral. He obtained the position of Chapel master in the cathedral of Tortosa in February 1817 and moved there, but days before he asked and won the same post at Col·legiata in Xàtiva.

Later he was Chapel master in Málaga, Toledo and Córdoba, where he asked at 1832 to replace Francesc Cabo in Cathedral of Valencia, but he had no success until December 1833. He held this position until his death in 1855.

== Media ==
- Lauda Jerusalem. La Llum Musical Xativina, 1 CD. (2007).
- Gozos a Nuestra Señora de la Seo de Játiva. La Llum Musical Xativina, 1 CD. (2007).
