= Trofeu Individual Bancaixa =

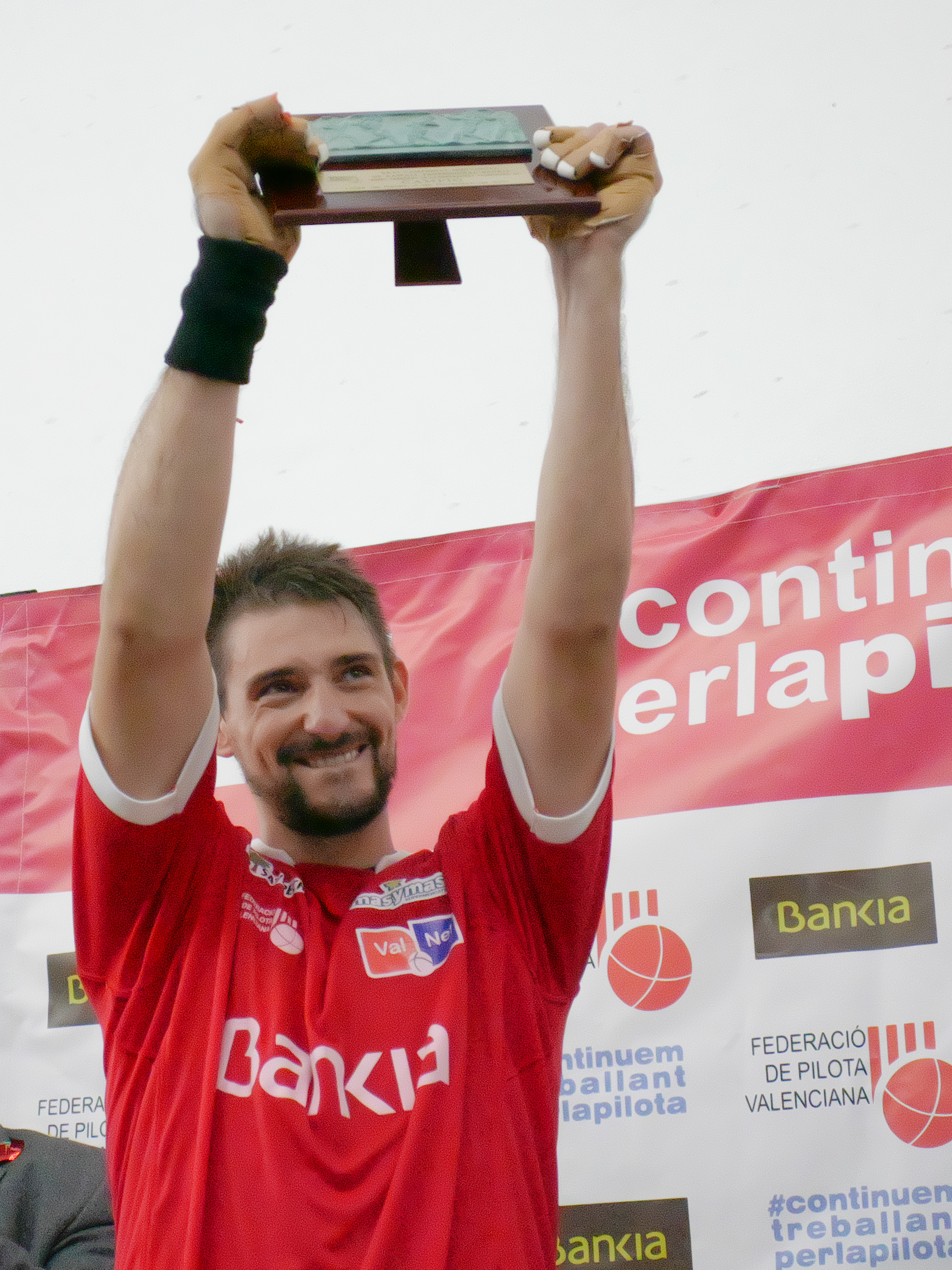
The winning trophy for the XXXII Individual Championship of Scale and Rope.

The Trofeu Individual Bancaixa (Valencian pronunciation: [tɾoˈfɛw indiviðuˈal baŋˈkajʃa]) "Bancaixa one-on-one trophy") is the Escala i corda singles league played by Valencian pilota professionals and promoted by the Bancaixa bank.

== Statistics ==
Year	Winner	Runner up	Score	Trinquet
2008	Álvaro	Genovés II	60-45	Sagunt
2007	Álvaro	Genovés II	60-25	Sagunt
2006	Álvaro	Miguel	60-20	Pelayo trinquet (València)
2005	Álvaro	Genovés II	60-45	Pelayo trinquet (València)
2004	Álvaro	Genovés II	60-55	Pelayo trinquet (València)
2003	Álvaro	Ribera II	60-30	Pelayo trinquet (València)
2002	Álvaro	Sarasol I	60-20	Pelayo trinquet (València)
2001	Álvaro	Núñez	60-30	Sagunt
2000	Grau	Álvaro	60-40	Sagunt
1999	Sarasol I	Pigat II	60-25	Sagunt
1998	Álvaro	Pigat II	60-25	Sagunt
1997	Sarasol I	Grau	60-30	Sagunt
1996	Sarasol I	Grau	60-45	Sagunt
1995	Genovés I	Álvaro	60-55	Sagunt
1994	Sarasol I	Genovés I	60-25	Sagunt
1993	Sarasol I	Genovés I	60-25	Sagunt
1992	Sarasol I	Genovés I	60-40	Sagunt
1991	Genovés I	Sarasol I	60-45	Sagunt
1990	Genovés I	Sarasol I	60-25	Sagunt
1989	Genovés I	Sarasol I	60-35	Sagunt
1988	Genovés I	Fredi	60-25	Sagunt
1987	Fredi	Oltra	60-25	Gandia
1986	Genovés I	Sarasol I	60-35	Pelayo trinquet (València)

== Relevant facts about the Trofeu Individual Bancaixa ==
- Grau has been the only mitger who won a competition almost always played by dauers.

== Specific rules ==
- Matches begin with a draw: 10–10 jocs.

== Seasons ==
- Trofeu Individual Bancaixa 2007

== See also ==
- Valencian pilota
- Escala i corda
- Circuit Bancaixa
