= Celedonio Calatayud =

Spanish physician

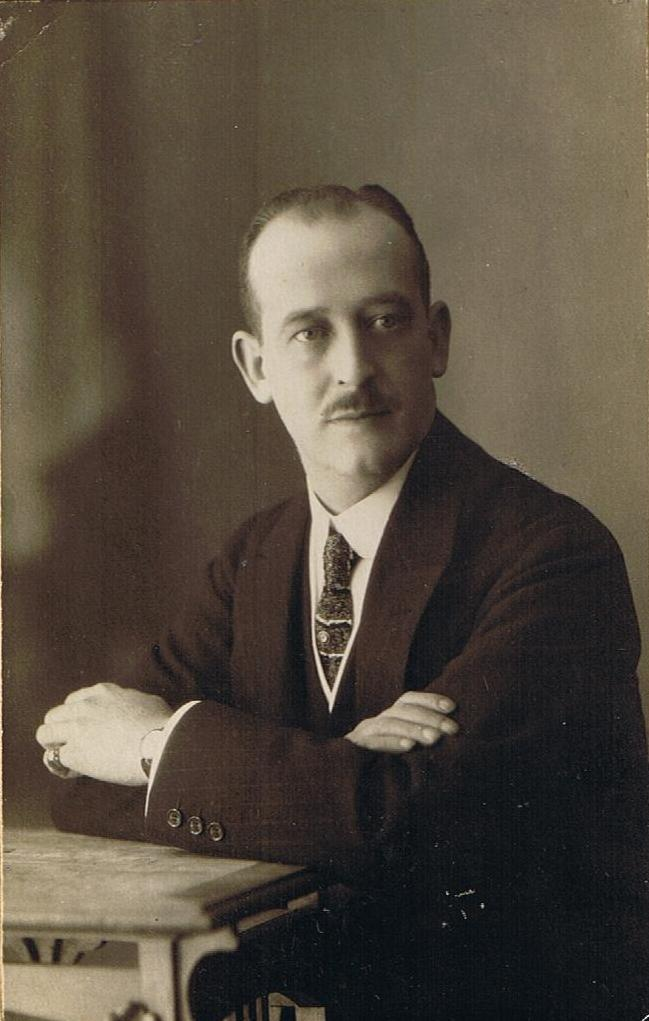
Celedonio Calatayud.

Celedonio Calatayud Costa (Spanish pronunciation: [θeleˈðonjo kalataˈʝuð ˈkosta]; October 29, 1880 in Pedreguer – January 24, 1931 in Madrid) was a Spanish scientist and radiologist, remembered for his achievements on radiology, radiotherapy, and electrology. He pioneered the use of radiology and electrology in Europe for both diagnostics and therapeutical purposes, introducing radiotherapy in Spain in 1906. He founded the Spanish Medical Electrology and Radiology Society (Sociedad Española de Radiología y Electrología Médicas), promoted the doctoral chair of Electro-radiology and was elected as the first professor to chair it at the Universidad Central (later renamed Complutense University of Madrid). He also was the driving force behind and creator of the First National Medical Congress that took place in Madrid in 1919, precursor of the use of diathermy in gynecologic therapy, founder of the Spanish Journal of Medical Electrology and Radiology (Revista Española de Radiología y Electrología Médicas) and Tribuna Médica, as well as author of many papers on electrodiagnosis, electrotherapy, roentgenology, and radiotherapy.

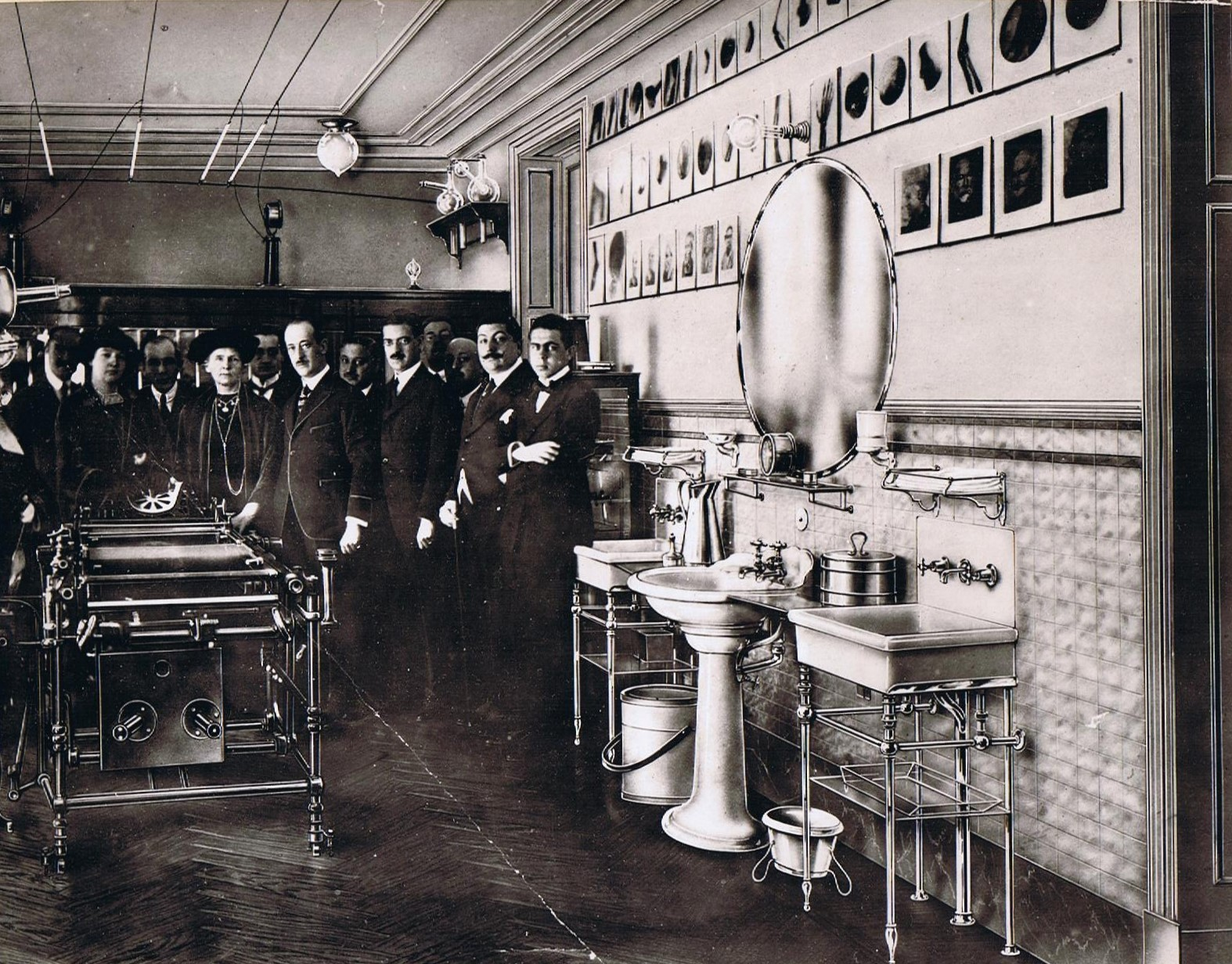
Marie Curie at the Radiological Institute of C. Calatayud

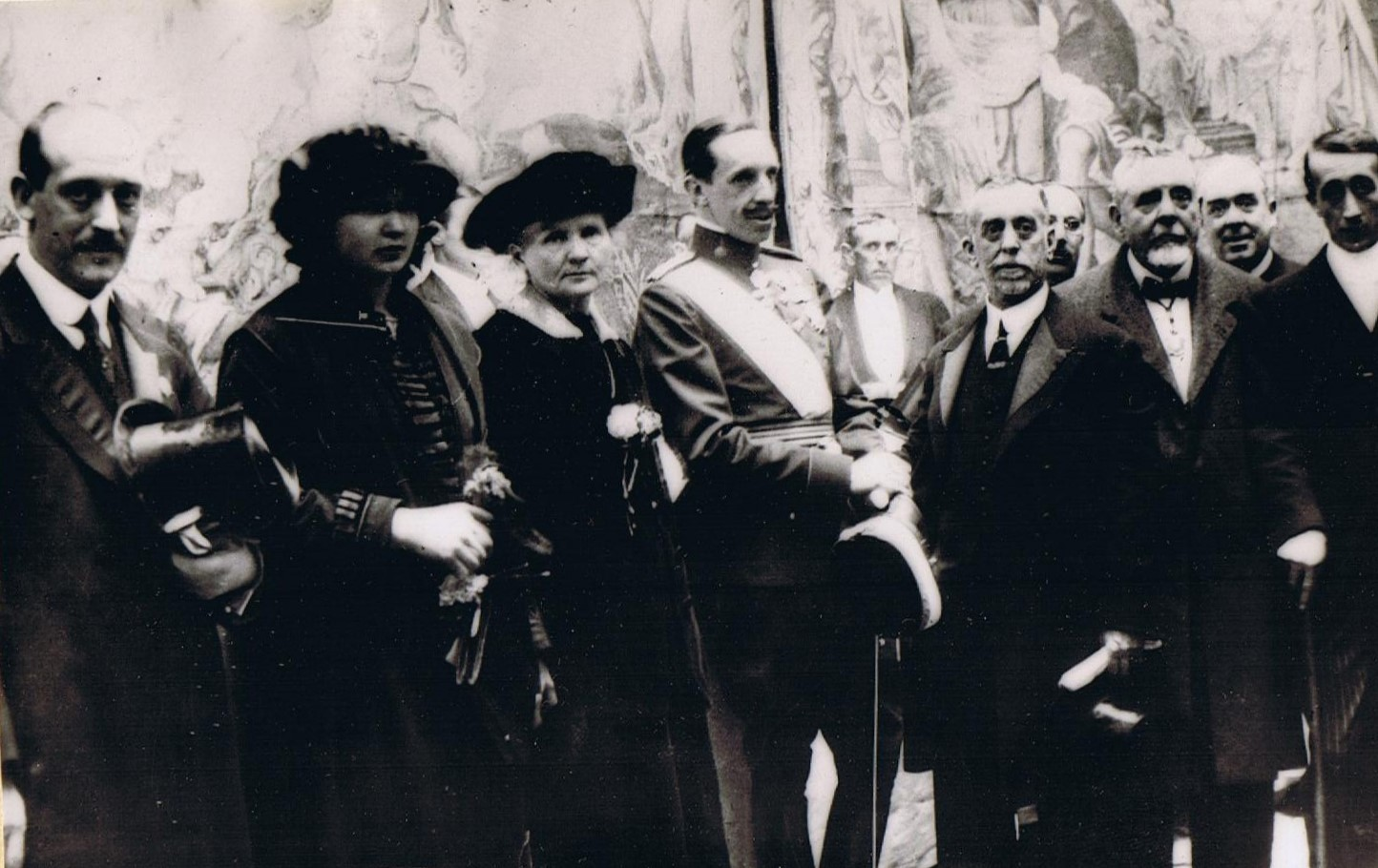
C.Calatayud with Marie Curie and King Alfonso XIII at the First National Medical Congress, Madrid, 1919

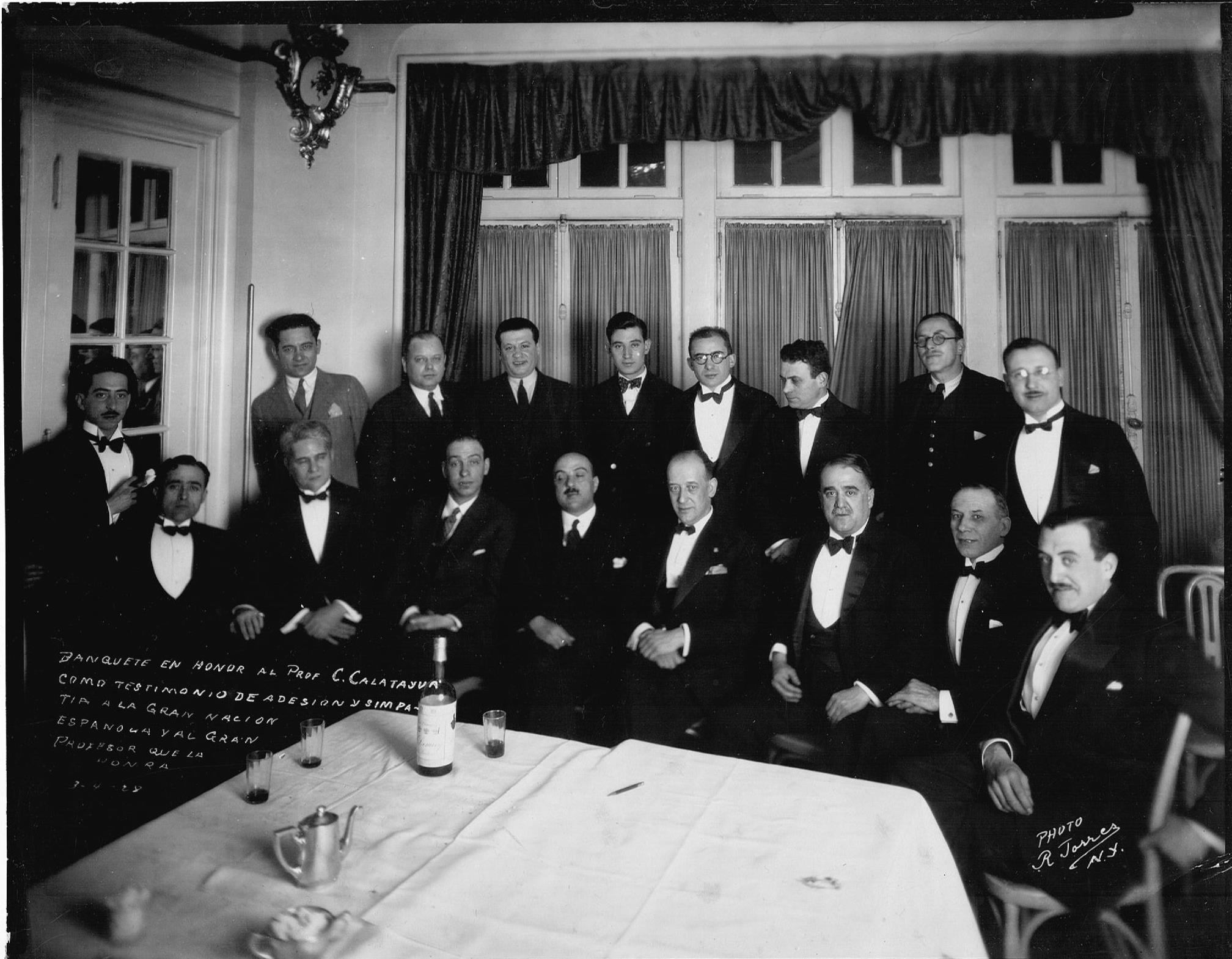
Reception in honor of C. Calatayud held by the American Medical Association at The Ansonia, New York, 1928
