= Jaume Morales Moltó =

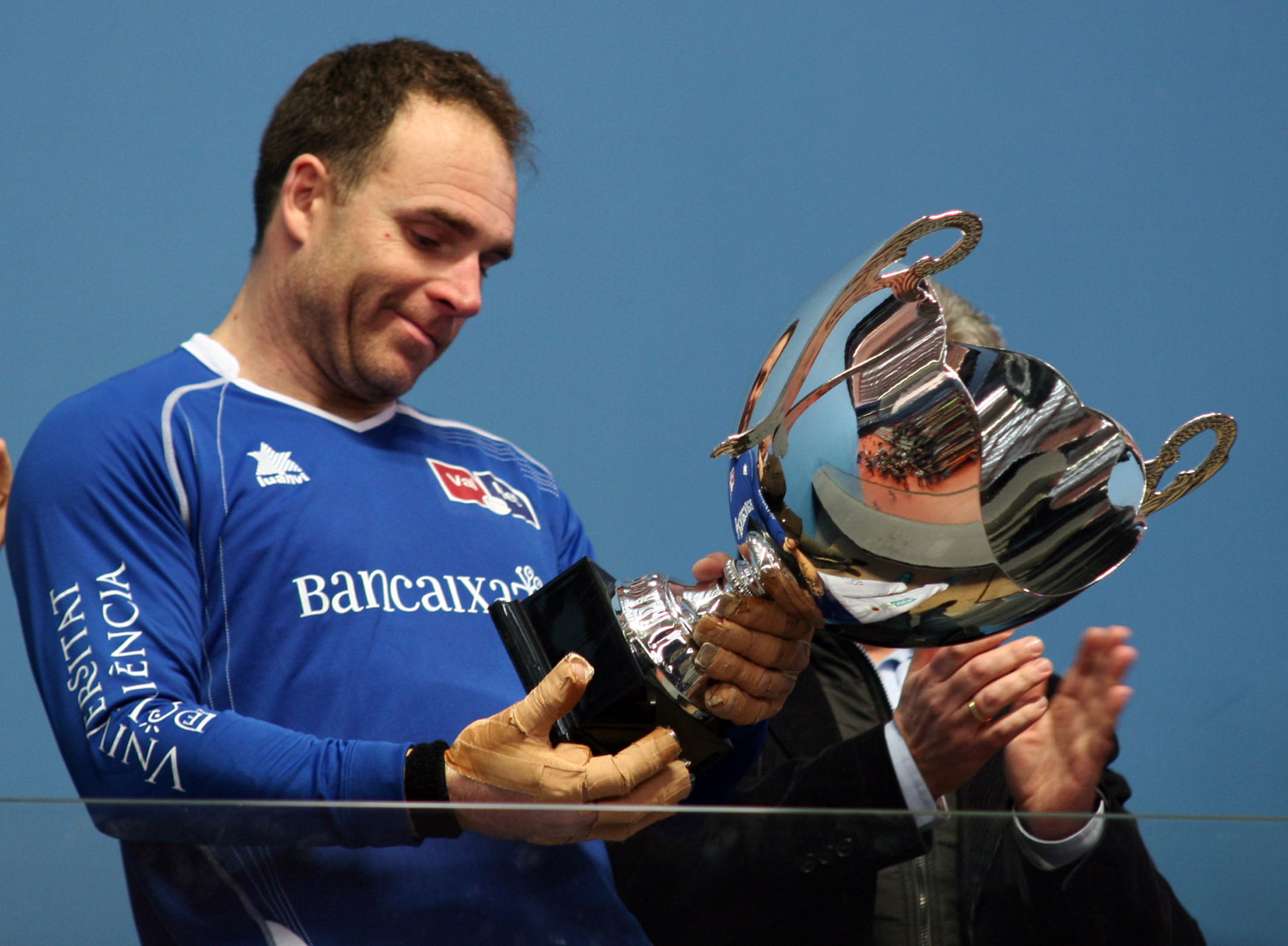
Jaume Morales Moltó

Jaume Morales Moltó (born 21 June 1973 in Altea), sporting nickname Tato, is a Valencian pilota professional player in the ValNet company team. He plays as mitger (midfield) of the Escala i corda variant with a unique and unorthodox style due to his early experiences as a player, playing the Llargues variant in the streets. He is a member of the Valencian Pilota Squad.

== Trophies ==
- Winner of the Circuit Bancaixa 2004, 2005 and 2006
- Runner-up of the Circuit Bancaixa 2000
