= José Cabanes =

Valencian pilota player (born 1981)

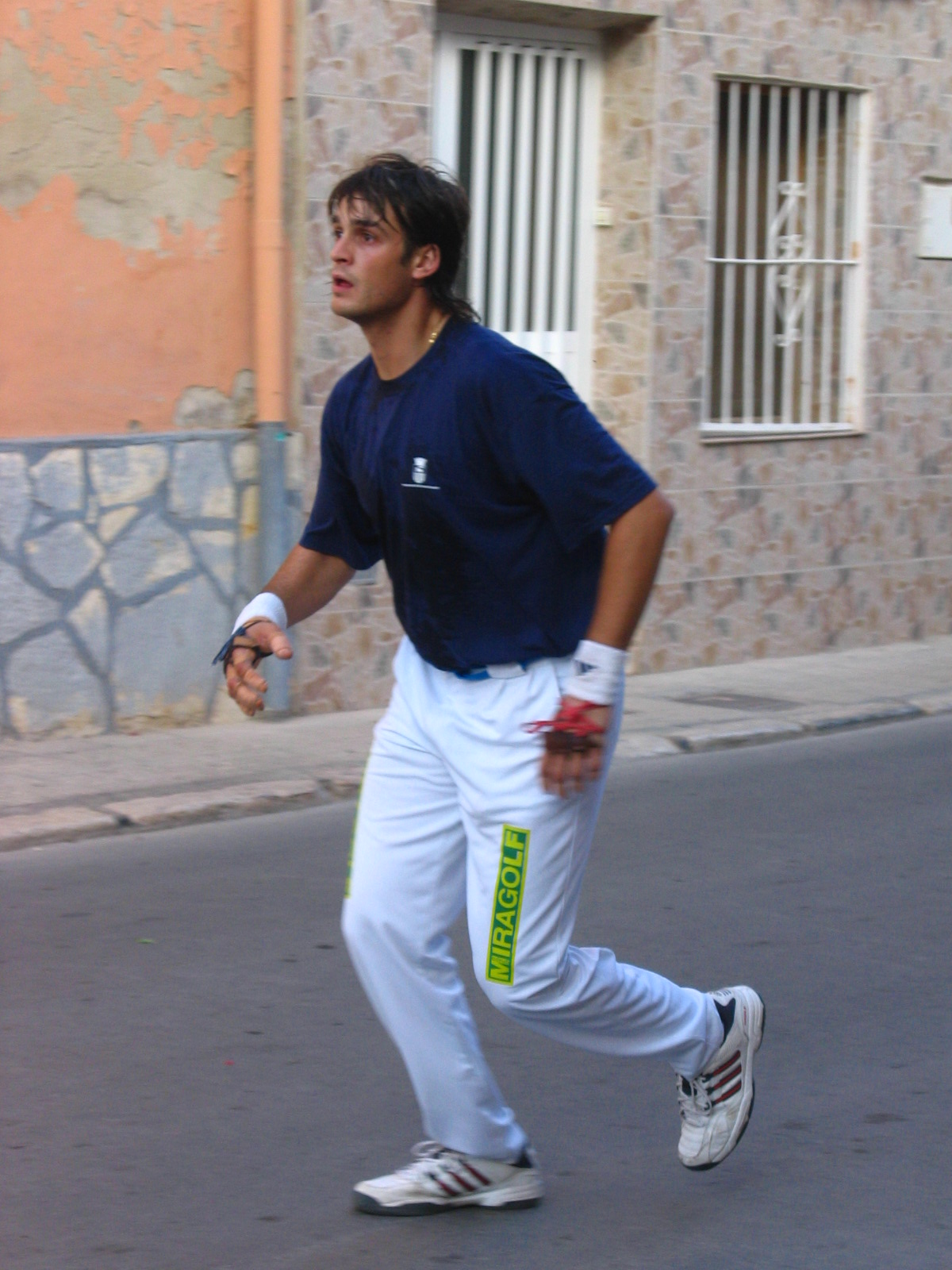
Genovés II playing Llargues

José Cabanes (born 1981 in El Genovés) is a professional Valencian pilota player, known as Genovés II because his father is Genovés I. He plays for the ValNet company as a dauer on Escala i corda matches, but he can be also seen in exhibition matches of Llargues, Galotxa, or Frontó (In summer 2005 he went with Álvaro to Paris to play a friendly match against Basque pilotaris). He is a member of the Valencian Pilota Squad.

He began playing seriously at the pilota schools. In 1998 he debuted at the trinquet of Vilamarxant. He won twice the Escala i corda Lliga Caixa Popular, and in 2002 he played for the first time the Trofeu Individual Bancaixa, the most difficult competition, and reached three eliminatories.

Nowadays, Genovés II is regarded as the number two of the pilota world, being the strongest player Álvaro. Their matches are longed by fans, and many towns contract them for exhibition matches on party days. At first, some fans did not recognize him as the son of Genovés I, but he got all respect in 2004, at the final match of the Escala i corda Trofeu Individual Bancaixa: He was winning Álvaro by an amazing score (15-55), but failed at doing the last joc and lost (60-55). The very next year, the final match was played by them, and Álvaro won again (60-45).

== Trophies ==
- Runner-up of the Trofeu Individual Bancaixa 2004, 2005 and 2007
