= José María Sarasol =

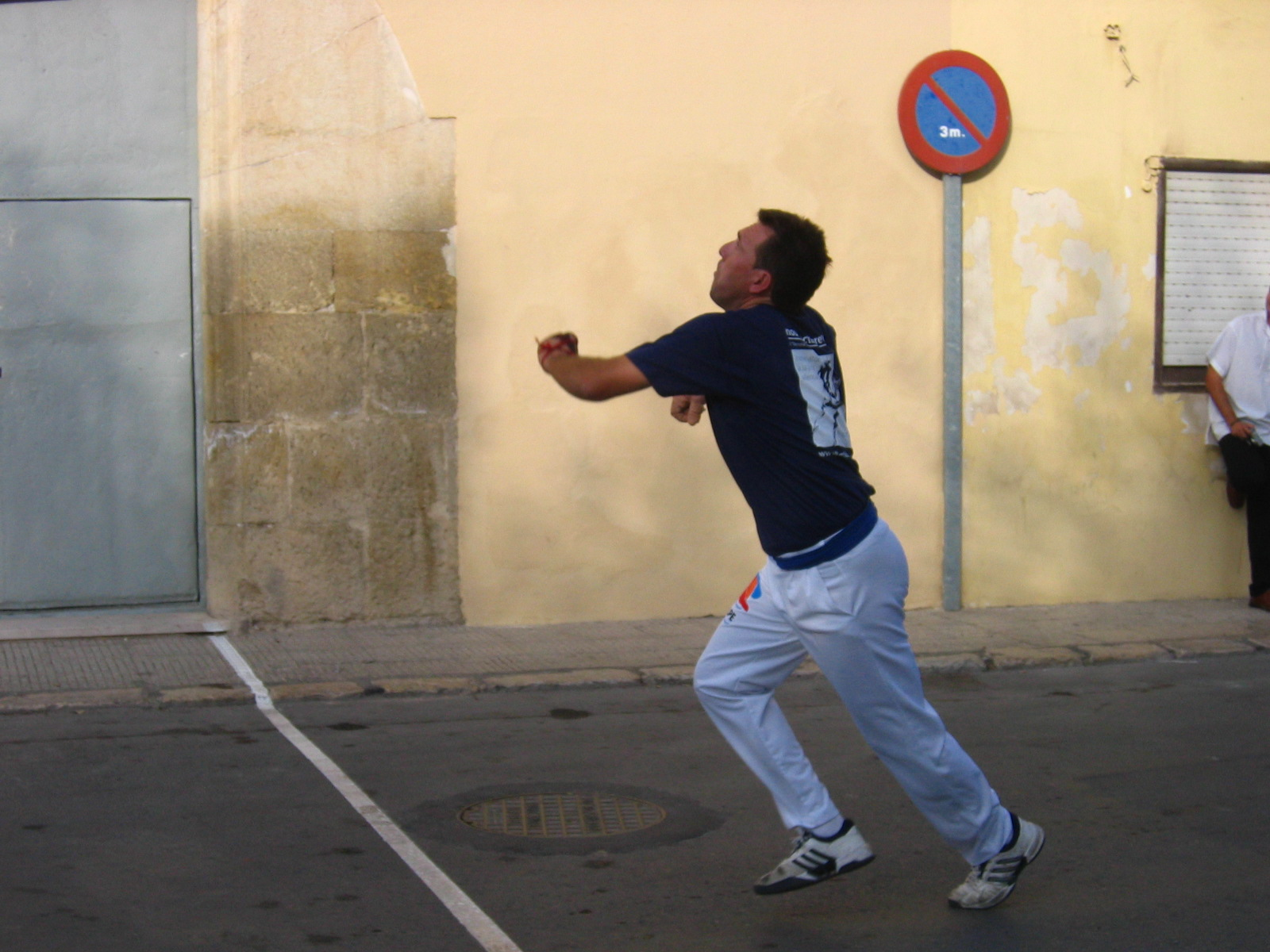
Sarasol II playing Llargues

José María Sarasol Soler (El Genovés 1970), Sarasol II, is a Valencian pilota professional player. His brother Enric was Sarasol I. He has been member of the Valencian Pilota Squad for 11 years and has deserved to be awarded as the Best Player at the Argentina'02 Handball International Championships.

For many years, he as a mitger and his brother as a dauer were a strong team at the trinquets when playing the Escala i corda variant, until Enric's retirement. Sarasol II keeps playing for the ValNet company.

== Trophies ==
- Winner of the Campionat Nacional d'Escala i Corda 1987 and 1992
- Runner-up Campionat Nacional d'Escala i Corda 1990
- Winner of the Circuit Bancaixa 1992, 1998 and 1999
- Runner-up of the Circuit Bancaixa 1993, 2001, 2004, 2005 and 2007

Handball International Championships

- Winner of the 5 Nations Llargues Championship, València 1993
- Runner-up of the European Llargues Championship, France 1994
- Winner of the European Llargues Championship, Imperia (Italy) 1999
- Winner of the World Llargues Championship, València 1996
- Winner of the World Llargues Championship, Maubeuge (France) 1998
- Winner of the World Llargues Championship, València 2000
- Winner of the European Frontó and International game Championship, Netherlands 2001
- Runner-up of the European Llargues Championship, Netherlands 2001
- Winner of the World Llargues, Frontó and International game Championship, Argentina 2002
