= Bellreguard =

Bellreguard Bellreguard (Valencian) Bellreguart (Spanish)
- Municipality
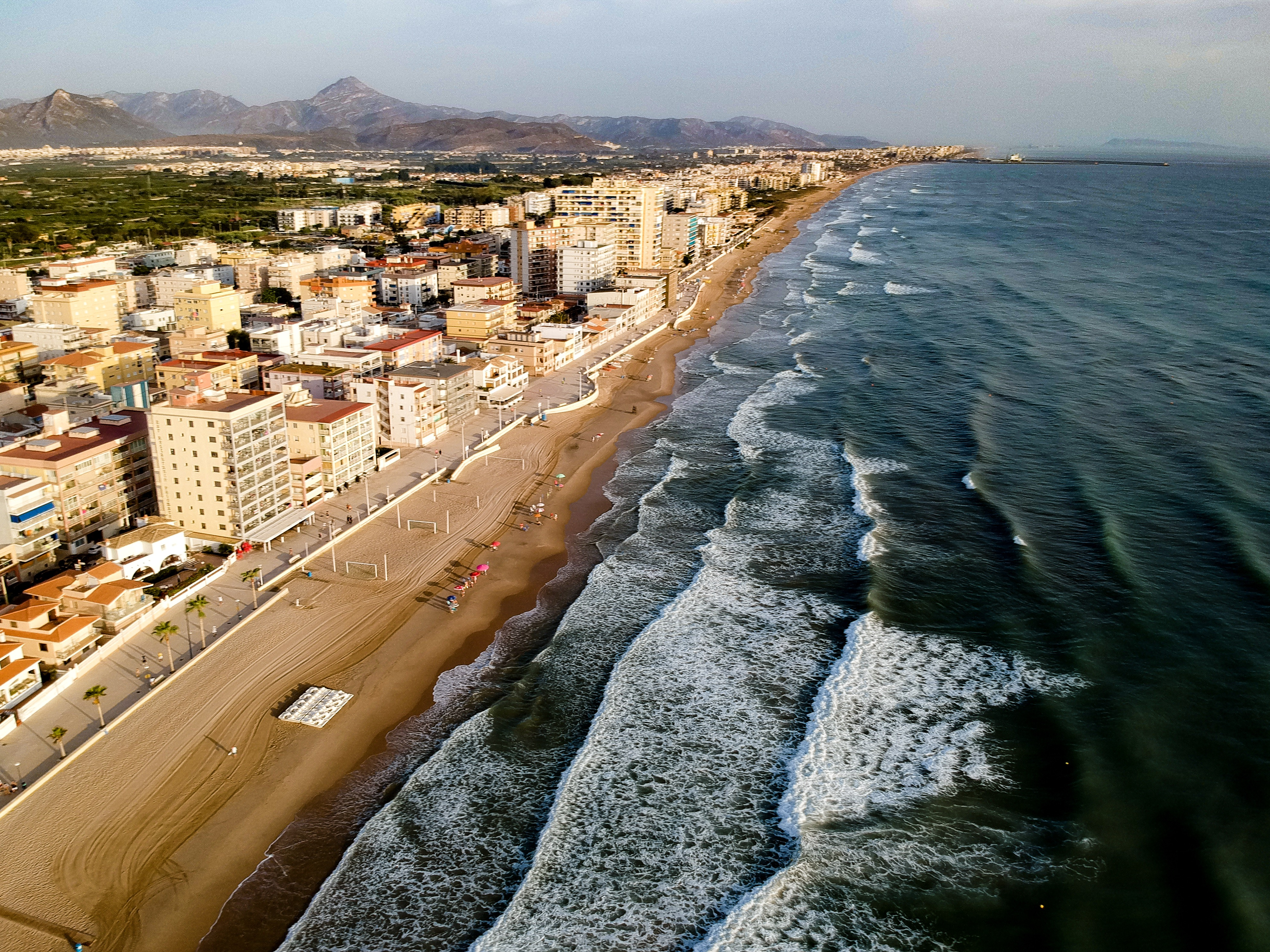

- Coat of arms

- Location in Spain
- Coordinates: 38°56′47″N 0°09′45″W
- Country: Spain
- Autonomous community: Valencian Community
- Province: Valencia
- Comarca: Safor
- Judicial district: Gandia

Government
  - Alcalde: Joan Marco Pastor (PSPV-PSOE)

Area
  - Total: 2.9 km^{2} (1.1 sq mi)
- Elevation: 15 m (49 ft)

Population (2025-01-01)
  - Total: 5,032
  - Density: 1,700/km^{2} (4,500/sq mi)
- Demonym(s): Bellreguardí, bellreguardina
- Time zone: UTC+1 (CET)
  - Summer (DST): UTC+2 (CEST)
- Postal code: 46713
- Official language(s): Valencian
- Website: Official website

Bellreguard (Valencian: [ˌbeʎreˈɣwaɾt]; Spanish: Bellreguart [ˌbelreˈɣwaɾ(ð)]) is a municipality in the comarca of Safor in the Valencian Community, Spain.

Bellreguard is a small village of just over 4,000 inhabitants located in the southeast of Valencia province, in the Mediterranean coast of Spain.

The local festivals are celebrated in September and the Moros i Cristians (Moors and Christians) parade is the most notable.

More information about this village can be found in Spanish and Valencian in the website of the Town Hall.

== Notable people ==
- Salvador Canet García, cyclist
- Joan Pellicer i Bataller, ethnobotanist; "fill predilecte de Bellreguard"
- Vicent Savall Vidal, singer
- Joan Benlloch i Vivó, cardinal, Bishop of Urgell, Archbishop of Burgos; "fill adoptiu i predilecte de Bellreguard"
- Ferran Cremades, writer

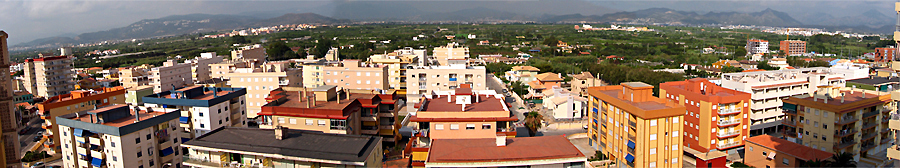
Panorama from Platja de Bellreguard into the direction of the interior of the country

== See also ==
- List of municipalities in Valencia
