= ValNet =

Sports association

ValNet is an association of Valencian pilota professional players.

In 2005 the retired pilotaris Alfred Hernando (Fredi), Daniel Ribera (Ribera II) and the trinquet owner Emili Peris, joined to create a brand new company that professionalized this old sport's environment: Assured minimal fees for the players, physical preparation, a number of weekly matches for everyone, levelled competitions and challenging exhibitions for bettings. This all has cleaned up and revitalized Valencian pilota world but has also carried some criticism because of alleged favours to certain players and trinquets.

== List of ValNet pilotaris ==
=== Professional players ===
- Adrián I
- Adrián II
- Álvaro
- Aucejo
- Canari
- Cervera
- Colau
- Dani de Benavites
- Espínola
- Fèlix
- Genovés II
- Grau
- Héctor
- Herrera
- Javi
- Jesús
- León
- Melchor
- Mezquita
- Miguel
- Nacho
- Núñez
- Oñate
- Pedro
- Pere
- Primi
- Raül II
- Salva
- Santi
- Sarasol II
- Solaz
- Soro III
- Tato
- Tino
- Víctor
- Voro

=== Feridors players ===
- Miguelín
- Oltra
- Pedrito

== Relevant competitions ==
- Escala i corda
  - Circuit Bancaixa
  - Trofeu Individual Bancaixa
