= Vicente Grau Juan =

Professional Valencian pilota player

Vicente Grau Juan (born 6 April 1968 in València) is a professional Valencian pilota player known as Grau. He plays mainly Escala i corda matches and is one of the best mitgers (midfield) playing for the ValNet company, due to his fast and strong ball-strikes (bot-de-braç and volea), he has been the first mitger who won the Trofeu Individual Bancaixa, a competition for dauers. He has been a recurrent member of the Valencian Pilota Squad, attaining many prizes, specially the "World's best player" twice.

== Trophies ==
- Winner of the Campionat Professional de Galotxa 1990 and 1991
- Winner of the Campionat Nacional d'Escala i Corda 1993
- Runner-up of the Campionat Nacional d'Escala i Corda 1991
- Winner of the Trofeu Individual Bancaixa 2000
- Runner-up of the Trofeu Individual Bancaixa 1996 and 1997

Handball International Championships

- Winner of the 5 Nations Llargues Championship, València 1993
- Winner of the European Llargues Championship, Imperia (Italy) 1999
- Winner of the Llargues World Championship, València 1996
- Winner of the Llargues World Championship, Maubeuge (France) 1998
- Winner of the Llargues World Championship, València 2000
- Winner of the International game World Championship, Netherlands 2001
- Runner-up of the Llargues European Championship, Netherlands 2001
- Best World player, Maubeuge (France) 1998
- Best World player, Imperia (Italy) 1999
