= Pelayo trinquet =

Trinquet court in Valencia, Spain

Coordinates: 39°28′1.42″N 0°22′43.81″W

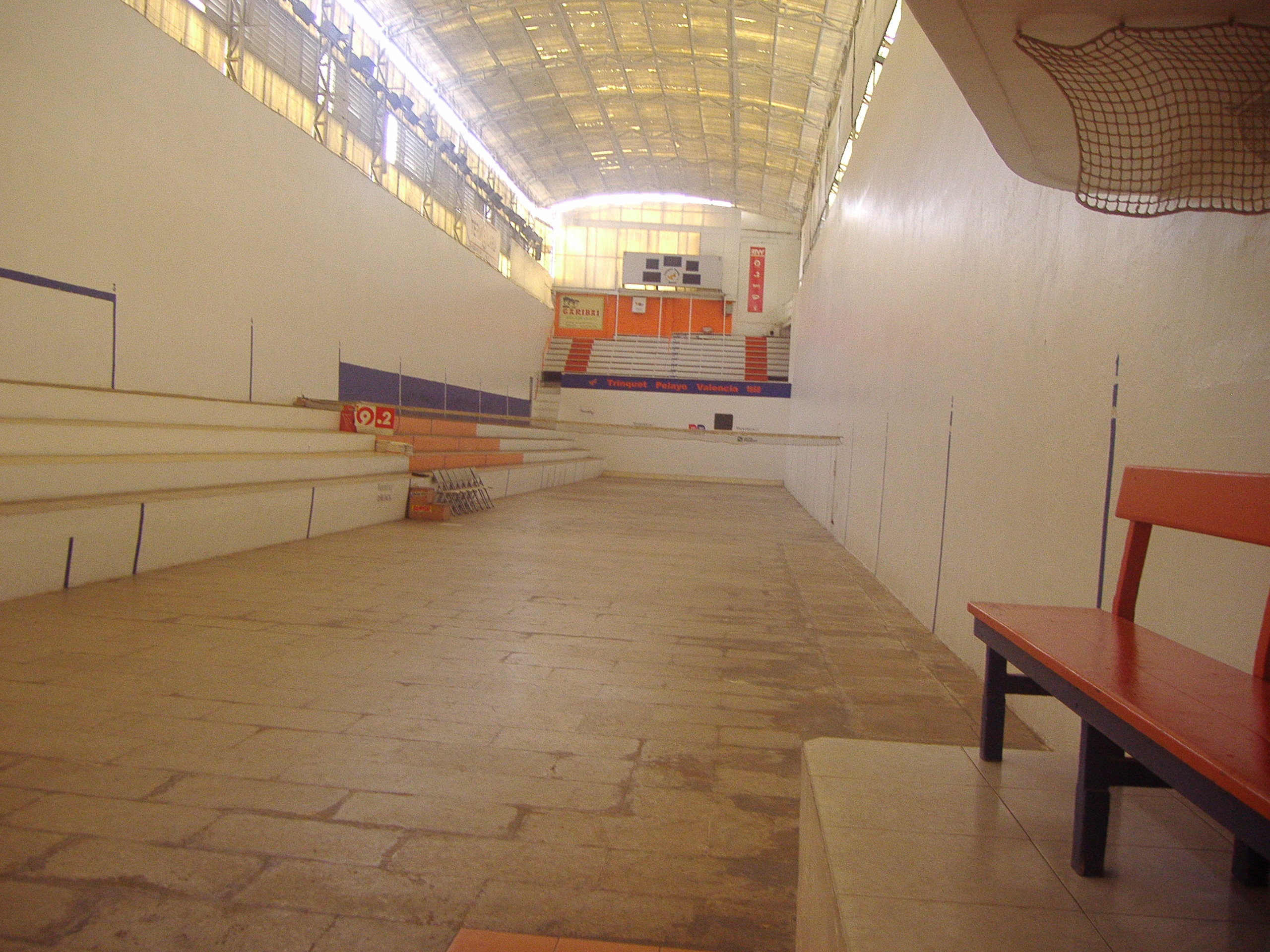
Pelayo trinquet, empty, as seen from the llotgeta

The Pelayo trinquet (Valencian: trinquet de Pelayo) is a trinquet court for Valencian pilota. It is the only trinquet remaining in the center of Valencia. The most important Escala i corda competitions, such as the Circuit Bancaixa, have their final matches played there.

== History ==
On August 20, 1868, a new trinquet was inaugurated, next to the Estació del Nord railway station, at Pelayo street, hence its name Pelayo trinquet.

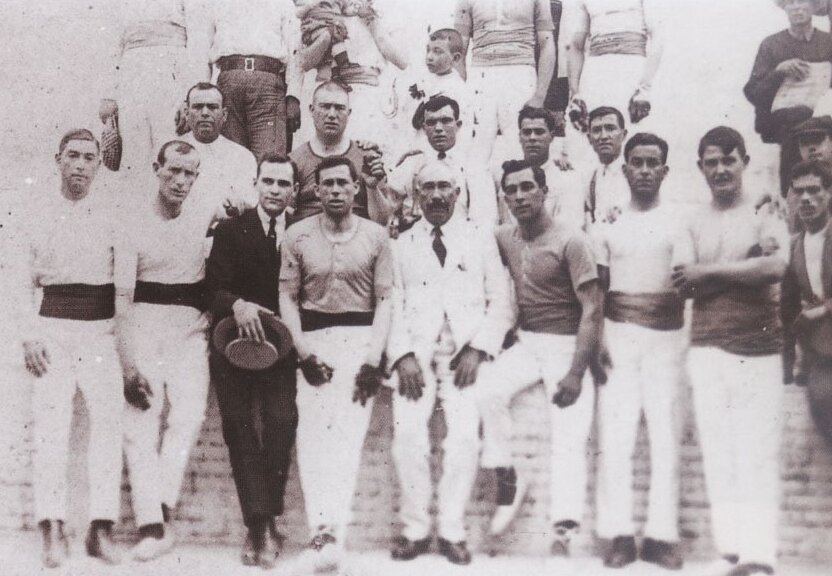
Pelayo professional players, 1925

Ever since that date, it has maintained its function as a Valencian Pilota court, without any remarkable interruption. During the Spanish Civil War the Pelayo trinquet was confiscated and administered by a trade union.

Its current owners, the Tuzón family, bought it in 1976 and are responsible for its renovation and current appearance.

The court contains a restaurant.

== The courtfield ==
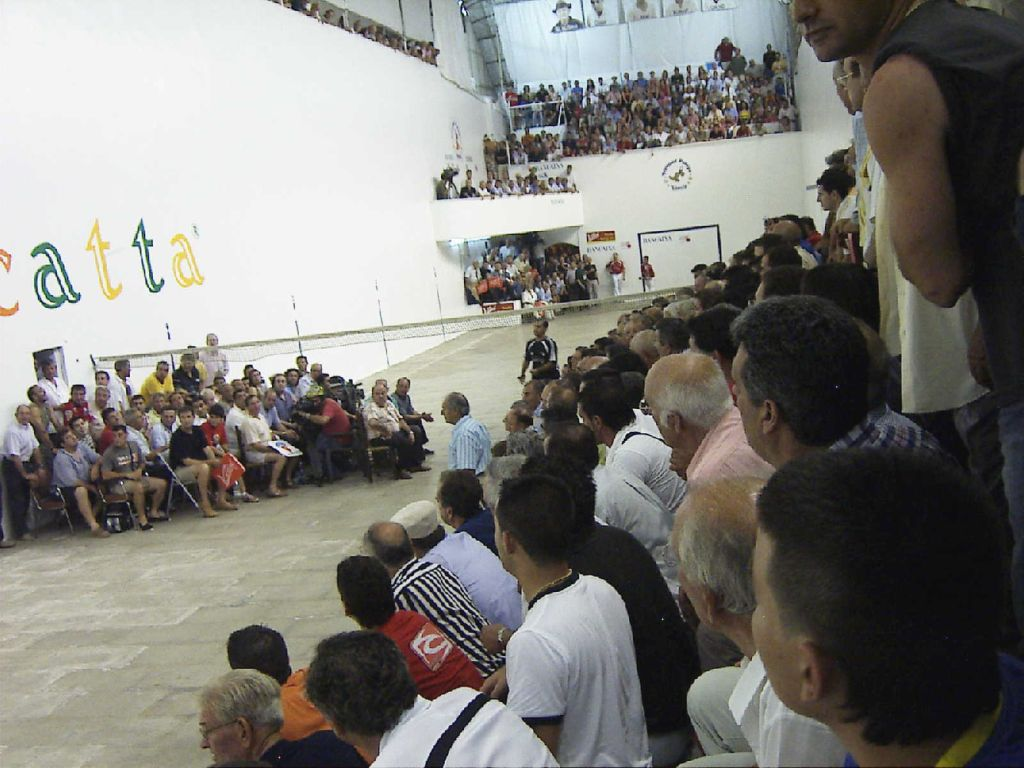
Pelayo trinquet as seen from the rest stairs during the 2005's Individual final

The Pelayo trinquet is nowadays a part of a restaurant-bar. In order to go to the courtfield spectators exit from the restaurant to a patio (covered by a sunshade), and from there they enter into the trinquet through a door next to the llotgeta corner.

Pelayo trinquet is, according to the necessities of the Valencian Pilota sport, an elongated court, with a length of 58.5 m, width of 11 m and height of 3 m. Despite its required elongated shape, it is actually one of the widest trinquets, which involves some challenge for players, who are used to smaller courts. This trinquet is power-lit and equipped with an electronic scoreboard on the wall behind the rest gallery.

The Pelayo trinquet has four galleries, the usual two on the dau and rest walls plus two more over the side walls. The llotgeta is very wide and slightly lifted up, but without a protective wall for watchers (only a net to catch high balls), also, the authority llotgeta covers it absolutely, so it's more difficult to throw the ball into the lower llotgeta.

On the dau wall, next to the llotgeta there's a wooden door to the patio, this door is normally open to allow casual spectators some indirect vision of the game and it becomes another place where the players aim the ball, in order to tamper the rival's back shot. Also, when the door is closed, the rebounds on the wooden door are unpredictable.

Regarding rebounces, it should be said that on the ground of the dau and rest walls there's a "tamborí", a 45° besel that raises up low balls with fast and unexpected rebounces.

In the beginning the ground was just gravel, then until the 1920s it was covered with tiles. Finally, in 1976 a roof was built and it became an indoor court. Before this date and, to some extent, shortly after (through holes made in the fences by corrosion) it was not uncommon that balls could fly out of the trinquet. Due to the high price of the vaqueta balls, every time a ball was thrown away, somebody (usually a boy) had the duty of searching for it. In order to accomplish this task he had free access to the neighbours' home patios, who, in exchange, had also free tickets to the matches.

== Honor gallery ==
Over the dau there are five huge pictures featuring the players who have earned a reputation as idols in this trinquet (and, by extension, in the whole game) over the decades. Taking into account that the Pelayo trinquet has been open for more than 100 years and there have been hundreds of players, its reduced number speaks of the strict criteria and the consensus gathered around those selected players.

Left to right, they are:

- José Vicente Riera Calatayud, El Nel de Murla
- Alberto Arnal, Quart
- Julio Palau Lozano, Juliet d'Alginet
- Antonio Reig, Rovellet
- Paco Cabanes Pastor, Genovés I
