= Alberic, Spain =

Alberic Alberique
- Municipality
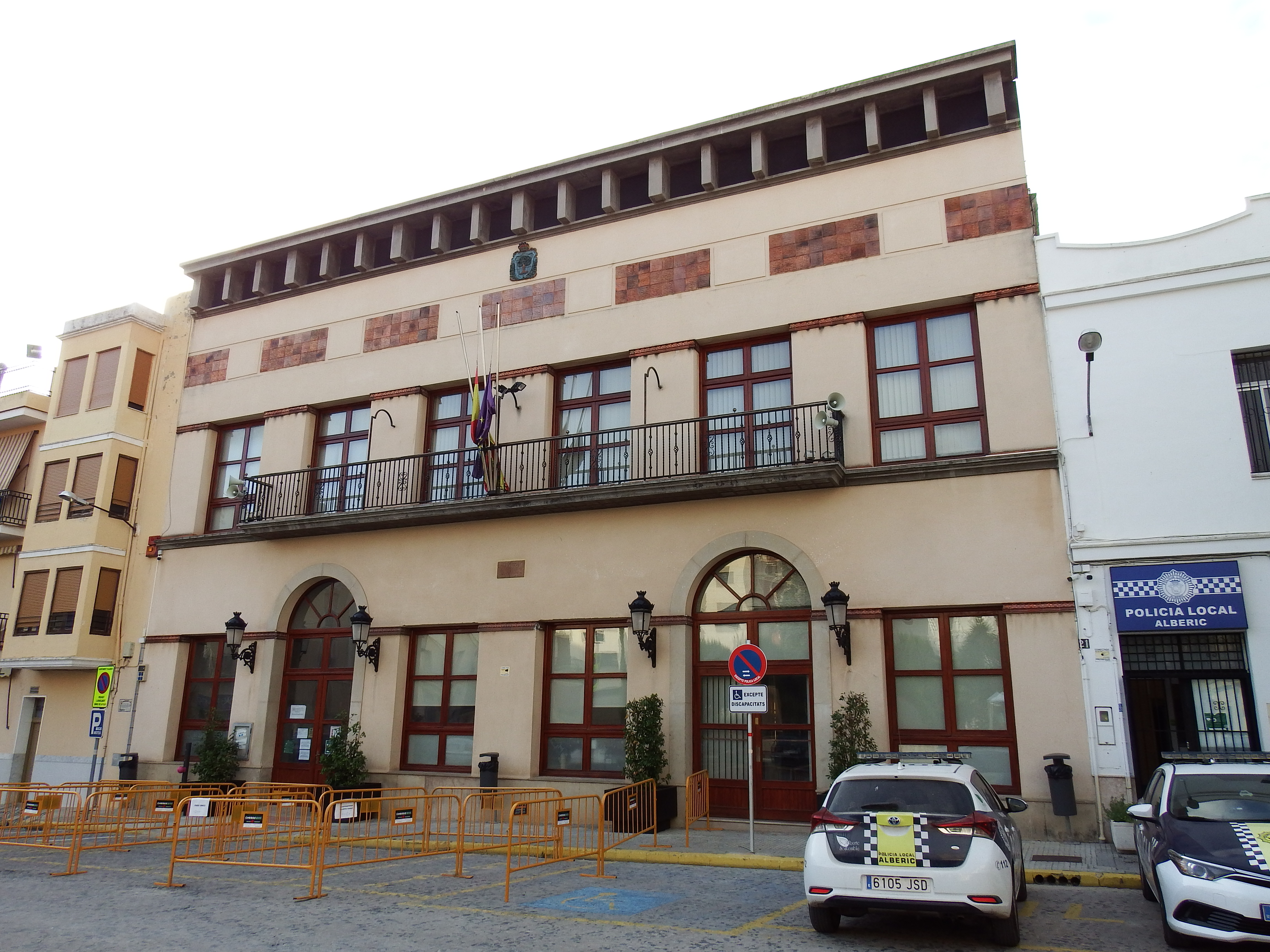
- Town hall of Alberic

- Coat of arms

- Location in Spain
- Coordinates: 39°7′0″N 0°31′16″W
- Country: Spain
- Autonomous community: Valencian Community
- Province: Valencia
- Comarca: Ribera Alta
- Judicial district: Alzira

Government
  - Alcalde: Toño Carratalá Mínguez (PP)

Area
  - Total: 26.7 km^{2} (10.3 sq mi)
- Elevation: 28 m (92 ft)

Population (2025-01-01)
  - Total: 11,099
  - Density: 416/km^{2} (1,080/sq mi)
- Demonym: Alberiqueny/Alberiquenya
- Time zone: UTC+1 (CET)
  - Summer (DST): UTC+2 (CEST)
- Postal code: 46260
- Official language(s): Valencian, Castilian
- Website: Official website

Alberic (Valencian: [albeˈɾik]; Spanish: Alberique [alβeˈɾike]) is a municipality in the comarca of Ribera Alta in the Valencian Community, Spain.

== See also ==
- List of municipalities in Valencia
