= Pedreguer =

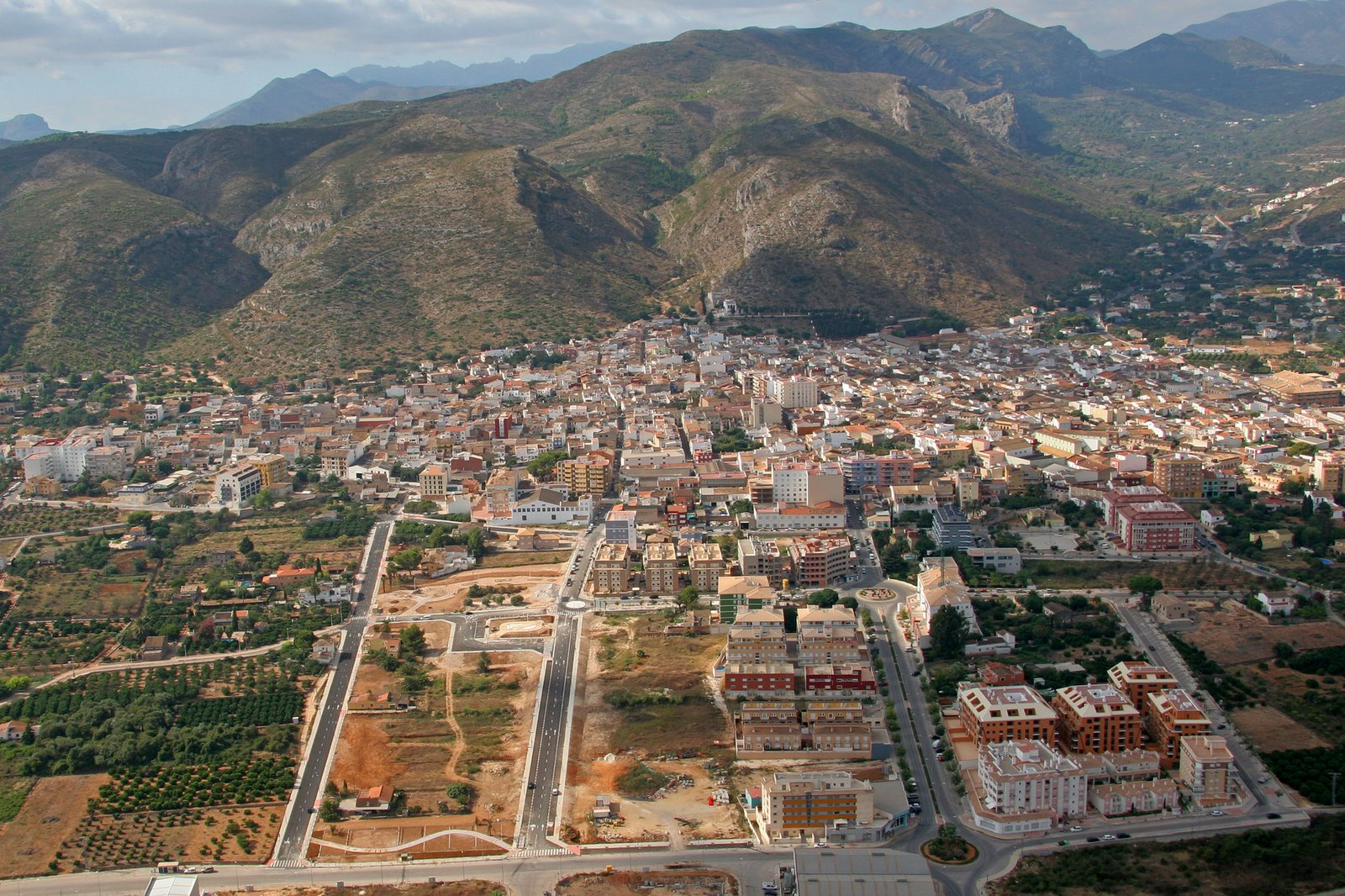
- Aerial view of Pedreguer

- Flag Coat of arms

- Location in Spain Pedreguer (Valencian Community) Pedreguer (Spain)
- Coordinates: 38°47′36″N 0°2′3″E
- Country: Spain
- Autonomous community: Valencian Community
- Province: Alicante
- Comarca: Marina Alta
- Judicial district: Dénia

Government
  - Mayor: Sergi Ferrús Peris (Compromís)

Area
  - Total: 30.3 km^{2} (11.7 sq mi)
- Elevation: 83 m (272 ft)

Population (2025-01-01)
  - Total: 8,849
  - Density: 292/km^{2} (756/sq mi)
- Demonym(s): Pedreguerense; Pedreguero, ra
- Time zone: UTC+1 (CET)
  - Summer (DST): UTC+2 (CEST)
- Postal code: 03750
- Website: pedreguer.es

Pedreguer (Valencian: [peðɾeˈɣeɾ], Spanish: [peðɾeˈɣeɾ]) is a town and municipality in the comarca of Marina Alta in the province of Alicante, Spain. The town is situated at the foot of the Muntanya Gran and close to the two larger coastal towns of Dénia and Xàbia. It has a population of 7097 (as of 2008). It is also close to the Jalon Valley which is famous for its springtime almond tree blossom.

Pedreguer Rastro is a sort of flea market in the town. Sunday morning is flea market day. Held on the polygons where people flock from all over the Costa Blanca to buy and sell produce, clothing, gifts, home made jams, chutneys and much more.

On Saturday mornings there is a farmers market held in the town.

The main high street has a church, police station, and town hall.

A Sports centre is located on the polygons with an outdoor swimming pool and other sports facilities.

La Sella resort comes under Pedreguer town which has a golf course, tennis club and local bars and restaurants.

Fiestas in Pedreguer include bull runs to firework displays.

Local beaches include Denia, El Verger, Els Poblets and Oliva.

== Notable residents ==
- Celedonio Calatayud (1880 - 1931) Spanish scientist and radiologist.
- José Gayà (born 1995) is a Spanish footballer, and the longtime captain of Valencia CF.
