= Álvaro Navarro Serra =

Valencian pilota player (born 1973)

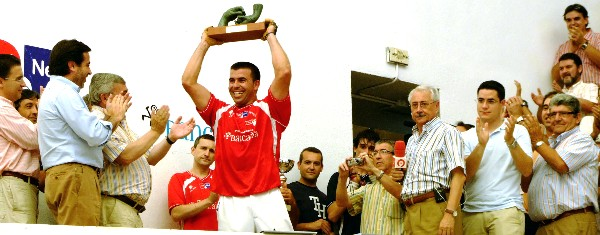
Álvaro, winner of the 2007 Individual

Álvaro Navarro Serra (Faura, 1973), known profesionally as Álvaro, is a former Valencian pilota professional player. He played as dauers and was a member of the Valencian Pilota Squad. He later become associated with the ValNet professional pilota company.

Álvaro began playing Galotxa variant, but he is mostly known by his Escala i corda career, where he is the absolute ruler, both in Circuit Bancaixa teams and in Trofeu Individual Bancaixa one-on-one matches.

On 2001 Álvaro led the Valencian Pilota Squad in the European Championship hold in the Netherlands, where the Valencians won the frontó and International game. He has also tripped to the Basque Country to play against renowned Basque pilotaris such as Agirre.

On October 9, 2005, Álvaro was awarded with the Golden Medal for Sports efforts by Francesc Camps, the president of the Generalitat Valenciana.

== Trophies ==
- Winner of the Trofeu el Corte Inglés 1992
- Winner of the Circuit Bancaixa 1997, 2001 and 2002
- Runner-up of the Circuit Bancaixa 1996, 2000, 2003 and 2006
- 11 Winner of the Trofeu Individual Bancaixa 1998, 2001, 2002, 2003, 2004, 2005, 2006, 2007...
- Runner-up of the Individual Trofeu Individual Bancaixa 1995 and 2000

Handball International Championships

- Winner of the European Frontó and International game Championship, Netherlands 2001
- Runner-up of Llargues, Netherlands 2001
- Winner of the World Frontó, International game and Llargues Championship, Argentina 2002
- Winner of the World Llargues Championship, Italy 2004
- Runner-up of Frontó and International game, Italy 2004
