= Petrer =

Petrer Petrel
- Town and municipality
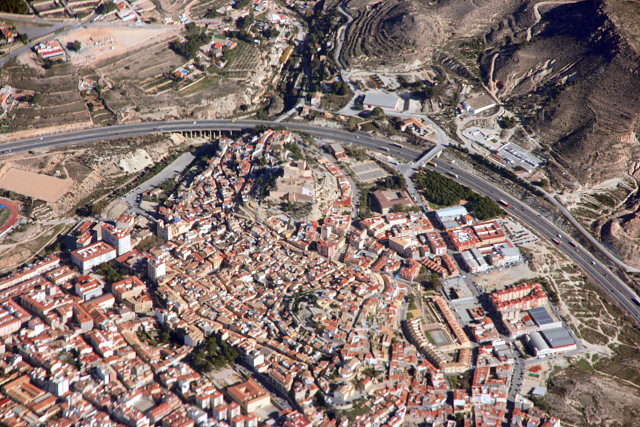

- Coat of arms

- Location in Spain Petrer (Valencian Community) Petrer (Spain)
- Coordinates: 38°29′04″N 0°46′10″W
- Country: Spain
- Autonomous Community: Valencian Community
- Province: Alicante
- Comarca: Vinalopó Mitjà
- Judicial district: Elda

Government
  - Alcaldessa (Mayoress): Irene Navarro Díaz

Area
  - Town and municipality: 104.26 km^{2} (40.26 sq mi)
- Elevation: 465 m (1,526 ft)

Population (2025-01-01)
  - Town and municipality: 34,022
  - Density: 326.32/km^{2} (845.16/sq mi)
  - Urban: 100,000
- Demonyms: petrerí, -ina (Val.) petrerense (Sp.)
- Official language(s): Valencian; Spanish
- Linguistic area: Valencian
- Postcode: 03610
- Website: Official website

Petrer, (Note: Pronunciation of Petrer: Valencian: [peˈtɾeɾ]) in Valencian (known in Spanish as Petrel), (Note: Pronunciation of Petrel (unofficial): Spanish: [peˈtɾel]) is a town and municipality located in the comarca of Vinalopó Mitjà, in the province of Alicante of the autonomous community of Valencia, Spain.

Petrer joins together with the city of Elda to form a conurbation of nearly 100,000 inhabitants. The creek Rambla dels Molins (Riverbed of the Mills), a tributary of the river Vinalopó, runs through the urban area of Petrer.

The economy of Petrer is based on the industries of footwear, furs, plastics, construction materials and pottery. The most important monuments in Petrer are the Catholic church of Sant Bartolomeu (Saint Bartholomew), the Arab castle and the hermitages of Sant Bonifaci and Christ.

The Moros i Cristians (Moors and Christians) festival of Petrer attracts many tourists each year. Valencian is the main language of the town, however in neighbouring Elda the main language is Spanish.

== Notable people ==
- Isaías Guardiola, handballer
- Gedeón Guardiola, handballer
- José Justicia, professional darts player
- Begoña Román Maestre, philosopher, university professor, researcher

== See also ==
- Route of the Castles of Vinalopó
