= Massamagrell =

- Municipality
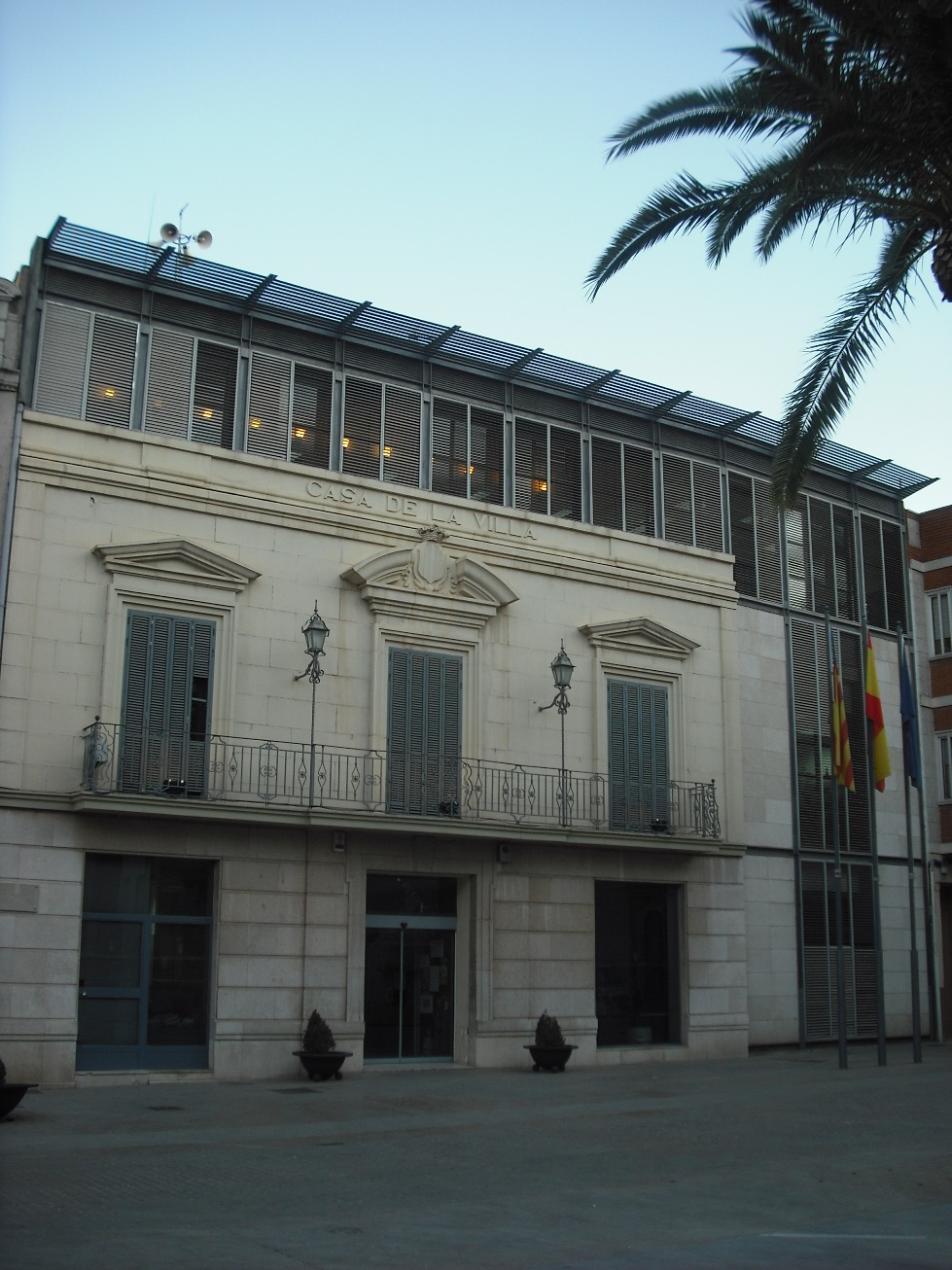
- The Town Hall of Massamagrell

- Flag Coat of arms

- Location in Spain
- Coordinates: 39°34′13.03″N 0°19′48.13″W
- Country: Spain
- Autonomous community: Valencian Community
- Province: Valencia
- Comarca: Horta Nord
- Judicial district: Massamagrell

Government
  - Alcalde: Paco Gómez Laserna (PSOE)

Area
  - Total: 6.2 km^{2} (2.4 sq mi)
- Elevation: 15 m (49 ft)

Population (2025-01-01)
  - Total: 17,566
  - Density: 2,800/km^{2} (7,300/sq mi)
- Demonym: Massamagrellés/a
- Time zone: UTC+1 (CET)
  - Summer (DST): UTC+2 (CEST)
- Postal code: 46130
- Official language(s): Valencian
- Website: Official website

Massamagrell (Spanish: Masamagrell) is a municipality in the comarca of Horta Nord in the Valencian Community, Spain.

== See also ==
- List of municipalities in Valencia
