= L'Eliana =

- Municipality
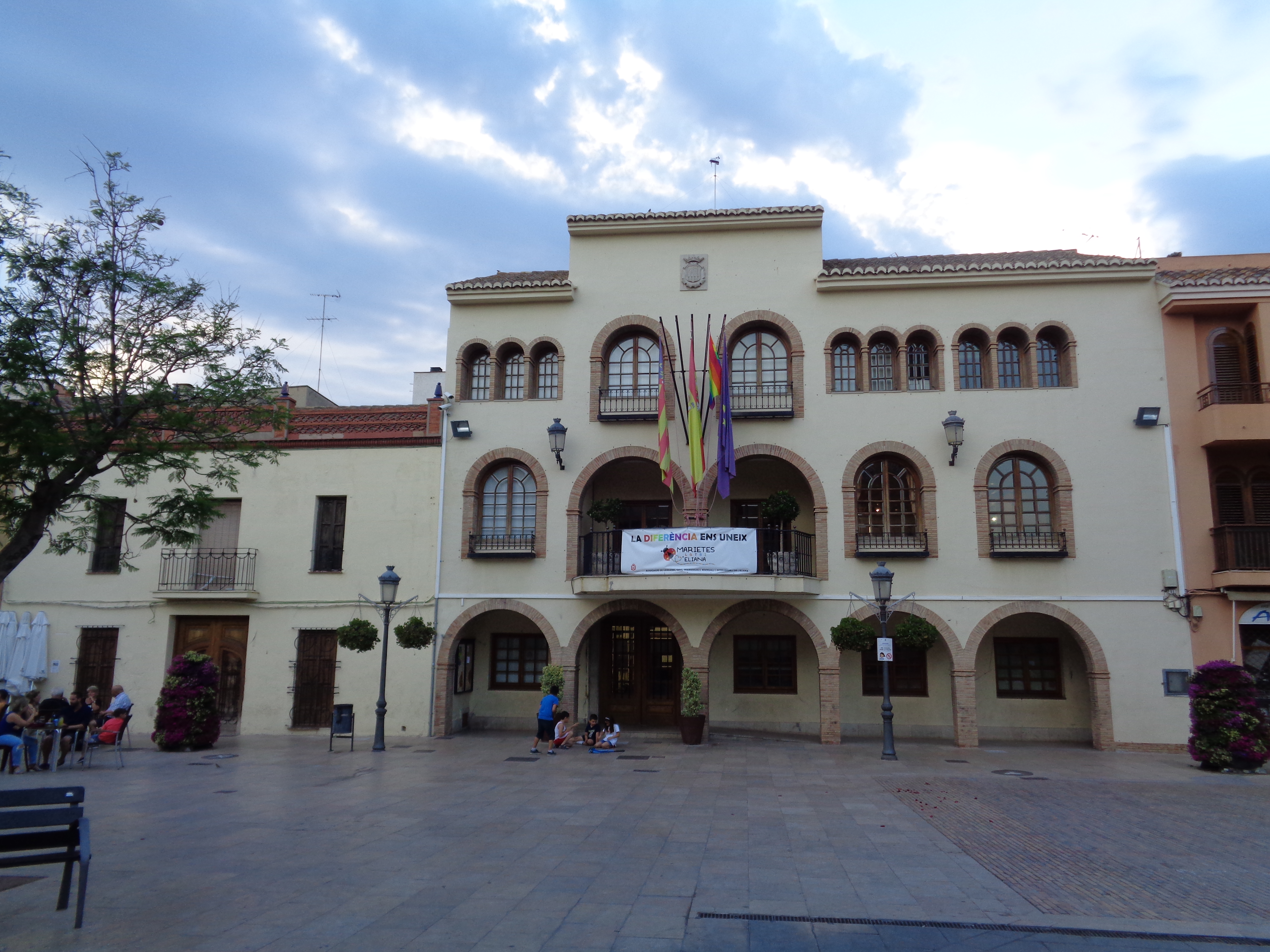
- Town hall

- Coat of arms

- Location in Spain
- Coordinates: 39°33′58″N 0°31′41″W
- Country: Spain
- Autonomous community: Valencian Community
- Province: Valencia
- Comarca: Camp de Túria
- Judicial district: Llíria
- Founded: 28 September 1238; 1937 of the [Puebla de Vallbona] invalidated in 1939. Final independence in 1958.

Government
  - Alcalde: Salvador Torrent Català (2015) (PSPV-PSOE)

Area
  - Total: 8.77 km^{2} (3.39 sq mi)
- Elevation: 93 m (305 ft)

Population (2025-01-01)
  - Total: 19,839
  - Density: 2,260/km^{2} (5,860/sq mi)
- Demonym(s): Elianer, Elianera
- Time zone: UTC+1 (CET)
  - Summer (DST): UTC+2 (CEST)
- Postal code: 46183
- Official language(s): Valencian
- Website: Official website

L'Eliana (Valencian: [leliˈana]; Spanish: La Eliana) is a municipality in the comarca of Camp de Túria in the Valencian Community, Spain.

== Neighborhoods ==
- Casco Antiguo
  - Les Casetes
  - La Fonda
  - Estació
- Almassereta
- Montesol
- Montealegre
- MontePilar
- Torre del Virrei
- Pinaeta del Cel
- Entrepinos
- Pla de la Paella
- El Carmen
- El Escorial
- San Agustín
- Hendaya
- Vistahermosa
- Los Almendros
- El Paraíso
- Gallipont

== Notable people ==
- Melani García, Spanish classical singer, winner of La Voz Kids 2018, and Spanish entrant for Junior Eurovision Song Contest 2019 with the song "Marte"

== International relations ==
=== Twin towns — Sister cities ===
L'Eliana is twinned with:

- Mirande, France
- San Mauro Torinese, Italy

== See also ==
- List of municipalities in Valencia
