= Guadassuar =

- Municipality
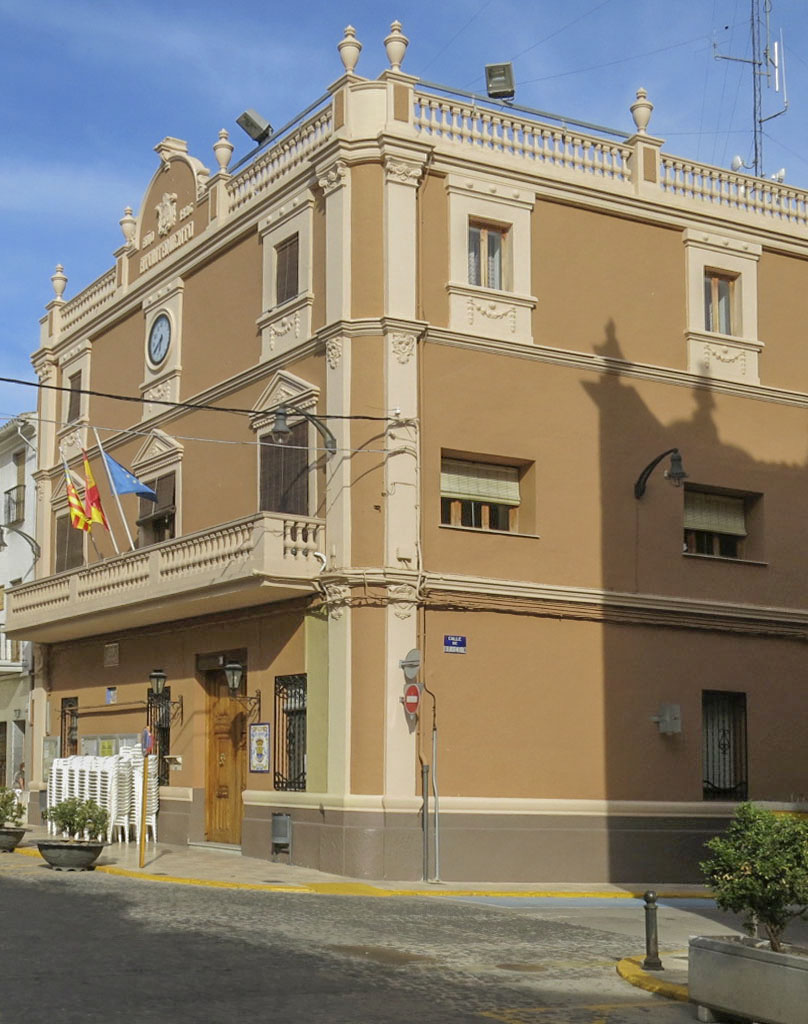
- Town hall

- Coat of arms

- Location in Spain
- Coordinates: 39°11′0″N 0°28′41″W
- Country: Spain
- Autonomous community: Valencian Community
- Province: Valencia
- Comarca: Ribera Alta
- Judicial district: Alzira

Government
  - Alcalde: José Ribera Añó

Area
  - Total: 35.3 km^{2} (13.6 sq mi)
- Elevation: 25 m (82 ft)

Population (2025-01-01)
  - Total: 6,039
  - Density: 171/km^{2} (443/sq mi)
- Demonym: Guadassuarenc / Malnom: Carabassot
- Time zone: UTC+1 (CET)
  - Summer (DST): UTC+2 (CEST)
- Postal code: 46610
- Official language(s): Valencian
- Website: Official website

Guadassuar (Valencian pronunciation: [ɡwaðasuˈaɾ]) is a municipality in the comarca of Ribera Alta in the Valencian Community, Spain.

== Notable people ==
- Choriza May, drag queen
- Juan Cuevas Perales, composer

== See also ==
- List of municipalities in Valencia
