= Valencian trinquet =

Type of indoor ball court

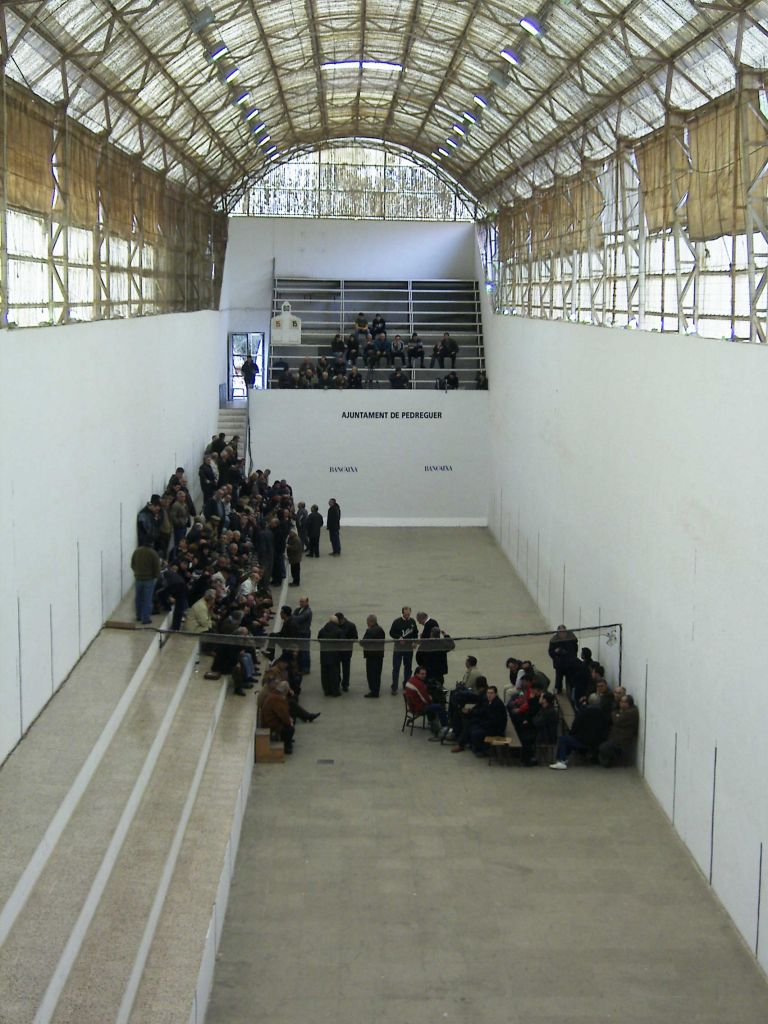
Trinquet ready for an Escala i corda game

Valencian trinquet, or simply trinquet (Valencian: [tɾiŋˈket]), is the court used in the Valencian Community for two different modalities of Valencian pilota: the Escala i corda and the Raspall.

== Court ==
Trinquets are closed rooms of variable size: from 8.5–11 m wide and 45–60 m long.

The short walls are called "frontons", and the long are the "muralles", 4–6 m high. The ball may bounce at them as many times as desired. On the frontons there are usually seats for the spectators, these are called the "galleries". And sometimes on the muralles, too.

There are also stairs (escales in Valencian) built on one of the muralles. Spectators may seat on them as well at their own risk. The ball is played many times on them since the stairs (and bodies of the people) may cause fast and unexpected bounces.

The court is divided in two midfields, the "dau" and the "rest".

On the corner of the "dau" frontó and the stairs there is a square draw on the ground, it's the dau (dice in Valencian). That's the place where every quinze begins.

On the corner of the "dau" frontó and the other muralla there is another place for bold spectators, the llotgeta (little balcony in Valencian).

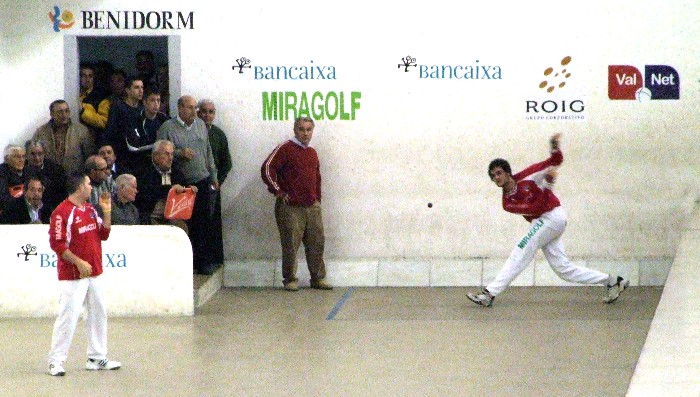
Escala i corda game, Genovés II plays from the dau.

When an Escala i corda match is going to be played there is a rope ("corda" in Valencian) used as net to divide both midfields. Under that rope there is a special mark on the ground. This mark is where a special player (the "feridor") must bounce the ball before sending it to the dau in order to begin every quinze.

== Spectators ==
Spectators may sit in different places of the court. The more prudent or simply casual watchers may choose to sit on the galleries on the top of the walls, where the ball is not sent (in the Circuit Bancaixa league).

But many people prefer to seat on the stairs, the "escala". In Escala i corda they all are restricted to seat on the "rest" midfield. It is not too dangerous but spectators seated there have to keep an eye on the ball because players may send it toward them in order to cause a special effect or an irregular bounce. In Raspall games the stairs are out of play, so people sitting there may feel a bit safer.

== Renowned trinquets ==
Many towns and cities have trinquets, some of them centuries old. The oldest accounts of these courts are from the 15th century, in València.

- Pelayo trinquet, in València, where matches are held since the 19th century and a place every pilotari wants to win. In fact, hundreds of players have passed by, but only 5 of them were honored to have their pictures exhibited, that's the Honor Gallery. It was built in 1868.
- Trinquet El Zurdo, in Gandia, also called The Raspall cathedral and Zurdo de Gandia.
- Circuit Bancaixa.

== See also ==
- List of Valencian trinquets
- Basque trinquete
