= Escala i corda =

Escala i corda (Valencian: [esˈkala j ˈkɔɾða], also [esˈkala j ˈkɔɾðɔ]; "stairs and rope") is the most prestigious variant of Valencian pilota, and the only one apart from raspall to have professional players.

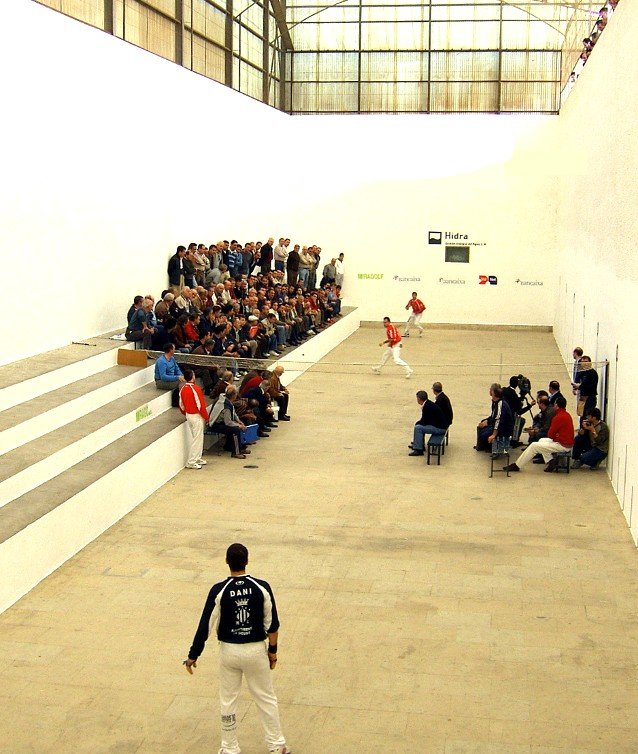

== History ==
The "Escala i corda" variant began around 1910, when the player Nel de Murla settled a 1.80 m high rope in the middle of a trinquet and thus divided the courtfield in two sides. Until then, the midfield was variable, using the "ratlles" of the Llargues variant.

== Ball ==
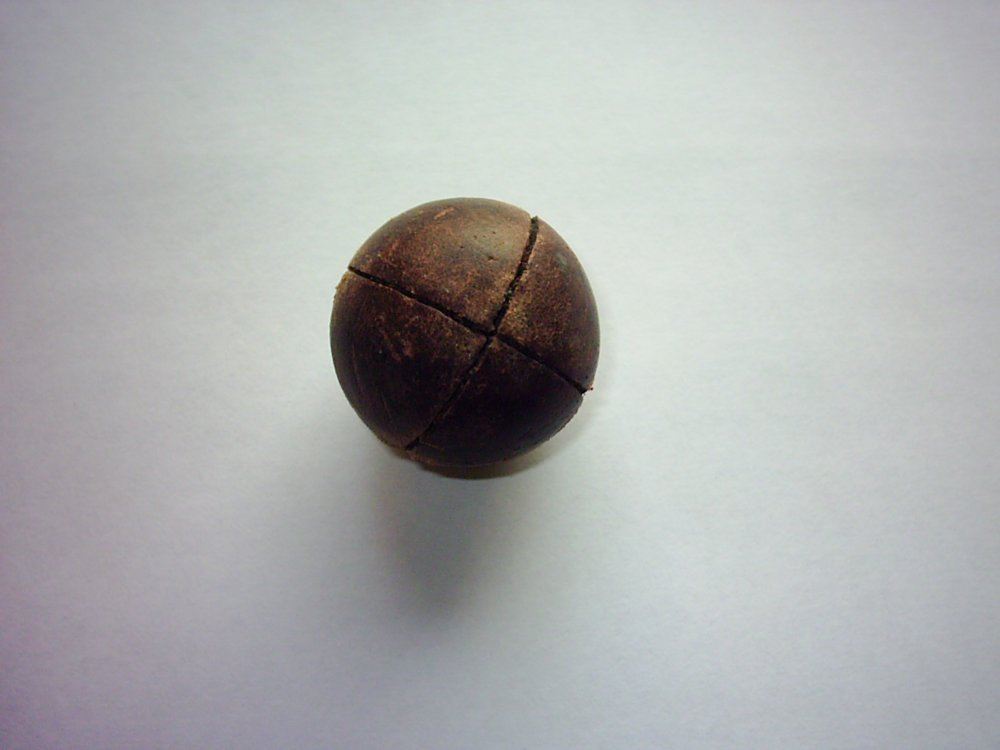
Vaqueta ball

In "Escala i corda" a kind of ball called pilota de vaqueta (Catalan for little cow ball) is used; it is a small and extremely fast ball, very tough, and bounces well. The name comes from the fact that it is made of cow leather. The dimensions of the ball for adult games are 42 mm diameter, 138 mm circumference, and 42 gr weight.

== Rules ==
The objective of an Escala i corda game is sending the ball over a net by hitting it with the hand. When the opponent does not return it, the sending team wins the quinze.

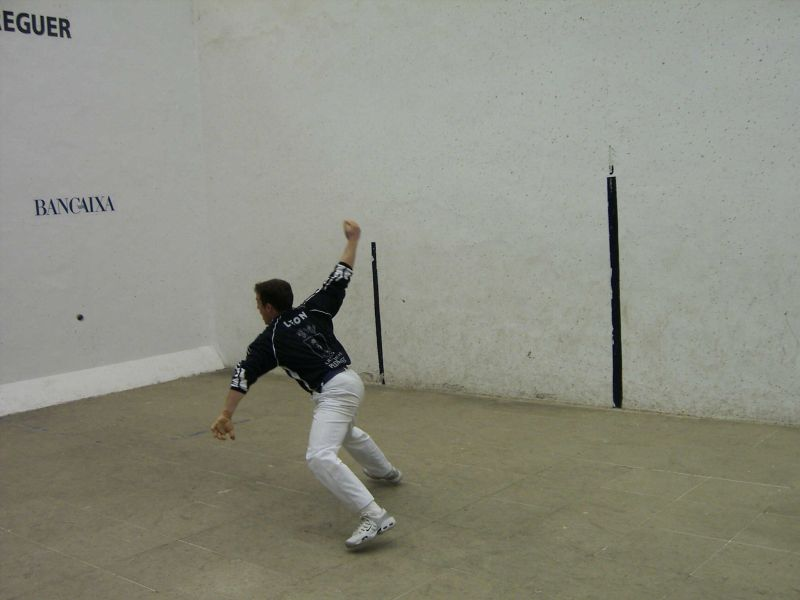
León throws himself to the ground to play a bouncing ball on the rest wall

Matches are played to 12 games, counting 5 to 5: every game scoring is valid for 5 points. Every game is divided in 4 "quinzes" (15, 30, val and game). The team who first gets 60 points for 12 games is the winner.

Every quinze begins when the "feridor" player throws the ball to the opponent "dauer", who must turn it back to the team in the "rest" midfield. This way, both teams will be sending each other the ball over the net, only hitting it by hand; they may hit the ball in the air or when it has bounced once on the ground. This continues until one of the teams is not able to throw it back or a "fault " is committed.

"Faults":

- When the ball bounces twice, or the same team (or player) touches it twice.
- When the ball touches the net or passes under it.
- When, in the "ferida", the ball doesn't enter into the "dau".

There is also a way to get direct "quinzes", by throwing the ball to the gallery of the trinquet or the "llotgeta" and without the ball coming back. In some competitions this is not allowed, such as the Circuit Bancaixa league or special challenges. This is because this way of scoring is too easy for certain players and is regarded as less spectacular. Anyway, in one-on-one matches "galleries" are allowed.

== Players ==
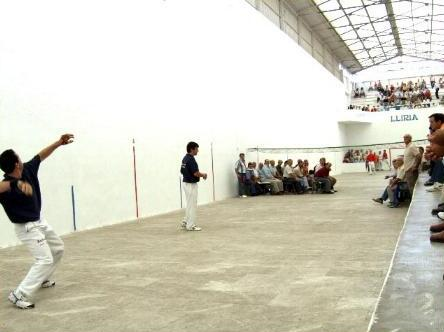

Escala i corda may be played one-on-one, but it is mainly a team sport. Teams may be formed by two or three players, and they may play in every combination (2 vs. 2, 3 vs. 3, or 3 vs. 2 if those three players are considered not to be as good as the other two); this way, bets are more interesting.

The favourite team (the one organizers thinks is better) will dress in red, and the other one in blue.

Players are called according to their position in the "trinquet". So, there is "dauer", a "mitger" and a "punter". There used to be also two special players called the "feridors" which are drawn by lots before the match begins to know who'll they play for (the "punter" may be the "feridor" as well).

- The dauer (also called "rest", "reboter", or "escalater") is the player closest to the walls, and hence in charge of throwing back the bouncing balls and most balls sent to the stairs. He will begin every "quinze" by standing into the "dau" and replying to the serve of the "feridor". He used to be the player who plays the "caiguda d'escala".
- The mitger is positioned in the middle of his team's field and his main shot is in the air, when the ball hasn't bounced on the ground. If the ball has bounced once he is able to aim and throw the ball to the corners, to the non-protected places of the opponent team, or to the special places such as the "galleries", the "llotgeta" or the stairs.
- The punter is the player closer to the net, that's why he will play fewer balls (because they are so fast they won't be able to hit them properly) and who needs less strength in order to throw it back, but also, he'll receive the stronger balls, hence he'll use more protections on the hands.
- The feridor is a special player. He might be a "punter", but many times, before the match begins, two "feridors" are raffled in order to know who'll they play for. He's in charge of beginning every "quinze" by throwing the ball to the "dau". This serve is called "ferida" (Catalan for "wound"), because the faster and more difficult the ball received by the "dauer" the more painful it'll be.

== Spectators ==
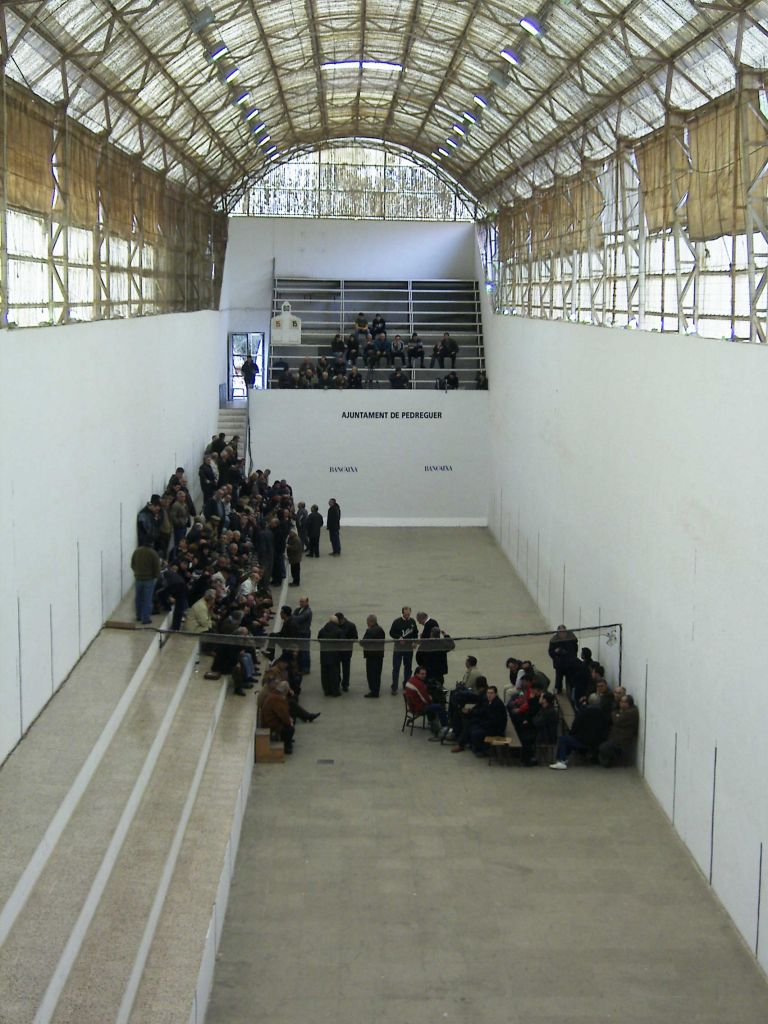
Spectators in a trinquet

When entering into a trinquet, spectators may choose where to seat. Some, the most careful will watch the match from the "galleries" on the top of the walls, and the bravest or scholars may be allowed to seat in the "llotgeta". Some selected people will seat under the rope (1,80 m high). But the majority of fans will be on the "rest" midfield stairs.

== Competitions ==
- Circuit Bancaixa, teams
  - Circuit Bancaixa 07/08
- Trofeu Individual Bancaixa, singles
  - Trofeu Individual Bancaixa 2007

== In media ==
Escala i corda is a short film directed by Jorge Bea in 2003. The plot deals with a ball game between two players who risk much in the result on a personal level. The story is set in 1909.
