= Handball International Championships, 2007 =

The 2007 edition of the Handball International Championships was the VII European Championship (in French Championnat d’Europe des Jeux de Paume), organized by the International Ball game Confederation, and was held at the Belgian cities of Nivelles and Buizingen during September 21 and 23.

The playing countries were Belgium, France, Italy, Netherlands and the Valencian Pilota Squad representing Spain.

Each own has its local variety: Belgian Balle pelote, Dutch Frisian handball, French Longue paume, Italian Pallone, and Valencian pilota.

Belgian players are professionals of their sport. There are also professional Valencian pilotaris, but in Escala i corda and Raspall, not in Llargues.

The varieties of the Handball sports derived from the old Jeu de paume that were played were International fronton, International game and Llargues.

The matches of International International fronton (1-walled) were played at the Turncentrum Start 65 of Buizingen, and the matches of International game and Llargues were played at the Parc de la Dodaine of Nivelles. Access to the matches was free.

== International fronton ==
The International fronton was played by teams of 2 players (with 1 replace), players were allowed to strike the ball with the bare hand or using a glove without reinforce. Matches consisted on 2 sets (11 points each one), with a third set in case of a tie (7 points).

Date	Team	Team	Sets	Score
09/21/07	Italy	Belgium	(03–11) – (01–11)	0-2
"	Valencian Sel.	Netherlands	(11-02) – (09-11) – (07–00)	2-1
"	Belgium	France	(05–11) – (11–08) – (00–07)	1-2
09/22/07	Italy	Netherlands	(01–11) – (01–11)	0-2
"	Valencian Sel.	France	(03–11) – (06–11)	0-2
"	Belgium	Netherlands	(11–08) – (11–05)	2-0
"	Italy	France	(00–11) – (03–11)	0-2
09/23/07	Italy	Valencian Sel.	(01–11) – (01–11)	0-2
"	Netherlands	France	(00–11) – (00–11)	0-2
"	Belgium	Valencian Sel.	(11–08) – (06–11) – (07–04)	2-1

=== Fronton Classification ===
Squad		Points	Matches Played	Matches W	Matches L	Games W	Games L	Diff
1	French	8	4	4	0	92	28	+64
2	Belgian	7	4	3	1	84	66	+18
3	Valencian	5	4	2	2	81	61	+20
4	Dutch	3	4	1	3	48	73	-25
5	Italian	0	4	0	4	11	88	-77

== International game ==
Due to time limitations, International game matches were played only one of the teams attained 6 games. In the classification, the winner team receives 3 points in case of victory 6-2 or better, otherwise (6-3 or worse) winner gets 2 points and loser 1 point.

Date	Team	Team	Score
09/21/07	Belgium	France	6-4
"	Valencian Sel.	Netherlands	6-1
"	Belgium	Italy	6-2
09/22/07	Italy	Valencian Sel.	5-6
"	Netherlands	France	6-1
"	Belgium	Valencian Sel.	4-6
"	Italy	Netherlands	1-6
09/23/07	Valencian Sel.	France	6-0
"	Belgium	Netherlands	5-6
"	Italy	France	6-3

=== International game Classification ===
Squad		Points	Matches Played	Matches W	Matches L	Games W	Games L	Diff
1	Valencian	10	4	4	0	24	10	+14
2	Dutch	8	4	3	1	19	13	+6
3	Belgian	7	4	2	2	21	18	+3
4	Italian	3	4	1	3	14	21	-7
5	French	2	4	0	4	8	24	-16

== Llargues ==
Under the name of Llargues the original Belgian handball, the Balle pelote was played. Since its differences are mynimal the adaptation requires a slight elongation of the courtfield and a softer ball.

Due to time limitations, Llargues matches were played only one of the teams attained 6 games. In the classification, the winner team receives 3 points in case of victory 6-2 or better, otherwise (6-3 or worse) winner gets 2 points and loser 1 point.

Date	Team	Team	Score
09/21/07	Valencian Sel.	Netherlands	6-4
"	Belgium	France	6-2
"	Belgium	Italy	6-0
"	Italy	France	1-6
09/22/07	Valencian Sel.	France	6-2
"	Belgium	Netherlands	6-4
"	Italy	Valencian Sel.	0-6
09/23/07	Netherlands	France	6-2
"	Belgium	Valencian Sel.	6-3
"	Italy	Netherlands	0-6

=== Llargues Classification ===
Squad		Points	Matches Played	Matches W	Matches L	Games W	Games L	Diff
1	Belgian	10	4	4	0	24	9	+13
2	Valencian	9	4	3	1	21	12	+9
3	Dutch	8	4	2	2	20	14	+6
4	French	3	4	1	3	12	19	-7
5	Italian	0	4	0	4	1	24	-23

== Champions ==
Variety	Winner	Runner-up
VII European Championship (Belgium, 2007)
International fronton	France	Belgium
International game	Valencian Sel.	Dutch
Llargues	Belgian	Valencian Sel.

=== Best player ===
During the award ceremony the CIJB chose Dutch Johan van der Meulen as the Best player.

=== Absolute winner ===
The Absolute winner is the team who scored more points in the over-all classification according to this formula applied to the different varieties:

- Winner: 4 points.
- Runner-up: 3 "
- 3rd place: 2 "
- 4th place: 1 "
- 5th place: 0 points.

Classification	Team	Fronton	Int. Game	Llargues	Total scoring
Winner	Valencian Pilota Squad	2	4	3	9
Runner-up	Belgian	3	2	4	9
3rd	Dutch	1	3	2	6
4th	French	4	0	1	5
5th	Italian	0	1	0	1

Since the Belgian and the Valencian Pilota Squad scored the same number of points (9), the next factor is the number of victories in all the varieties, but they both won the same number of matches (9 again), then another factor applied is the number of points acquired in every variety which resulted in a third draw (24 points)

So, the CIJB, in a meeting previous to the award ceremony decided the Valencian Pilota Squad to be the Absolute Champion.

== Squads ==
=== Belgian squad ===
- Picture

Coach:

- Jean-Luc Plaitin

Physician:

- Claude Wery

Referees:

- Daniel Cordier
- Eddy Peeters
- Johny Van Eesbeek

Players:

- Samuel Brassart
- Philippe Demil
- Ludovic Destrain
- David De Vits
- Benjamin Dochier
- Steve Dugauquier
- Guillaume Dumoulin
- Damien Famelart
- Geoffrey Frebutte
- Laurent Gobron
- Franck Van Den Bulcke
- Geert Vinck

=== Dutch squad ===
Coach:

- Pieter Tienstra

Physician:

- Piet van Assen

Referees:

- Peter de Bruin
- Sipke Hiemstra

Players:

- Johannes Boersma
- Marten Feenstra
- Robert Grovenstein
- Marten Hiemstra
- Pier Piersma
- Robert Rinia
- Johan van der Meulen, Best player
- Michel van der Veen
- Folkert van der Wei

=== French squad ===
Coach:

- Eric Midavaine

Referees:

- Jean-Pierre Charpentier
- Laurent Tollenaere

Players:

- Bruno Blanquet
- Andy Couteau
- Michaël Dhont
- Conrad Dubois
- Grégory Fontaine
- Laurent Joissains
- Nicolas Picry
- Loïc Potrich
- Florian Toubeaux

=== Italian squad ===
Coach:

- Sergio Corino

Physicians:

- Roberto Campini
- Sergio Giunta

Referees:

- Massimo Ardenti
- Roberto Ravinale

Players:

- Lorenzo Bolla
- Gianluca Busca
- Andrea Corino
- Oscar Giribaldi
- Paolo Neri
- Marco Ramazzotti
- Enrico Rinaldi
- Alessandro Simondi
- Marco Vero

=== Valencian squad ===
- Picture

Coach:

- Pasqual Sanchis Moscardó, Pigat II

Physician:

- Jaume Martí Martí

Psychologists:

- Rocío Gómez Gómez
- Rafael Díaz Cortinas

Referees:

- Conrado Ferrando Borruel
- José María Cortell Chesa

Players:

- Álvaro of Tibi
- David of Petrer
- Ferdi of Godelleta
- Héctor of Meliana
- Jan of Murla
- Màlia I of La Vall de Laguar
- Mario of El Campello
- Martínez of El Campello
- Nacho of Beniparrell
- Pasqual II of La Pobla de Vallbona
- Santi of Finestrat

All of them, except Pasqual II, are amateur players.

Also, the main amount of them come from the Llargues competitions, except of Pasqual II from the Valencian fronto, and Ferdi, Héctor and Nacho from the Galotxa.

6 of the 11 players were debutantes, and 5 of them younger than 25 years old.
