= List of Valencian pilotaris =

This is a list of relevant Valencian pilotaris, that is, players of Valencian pilota.

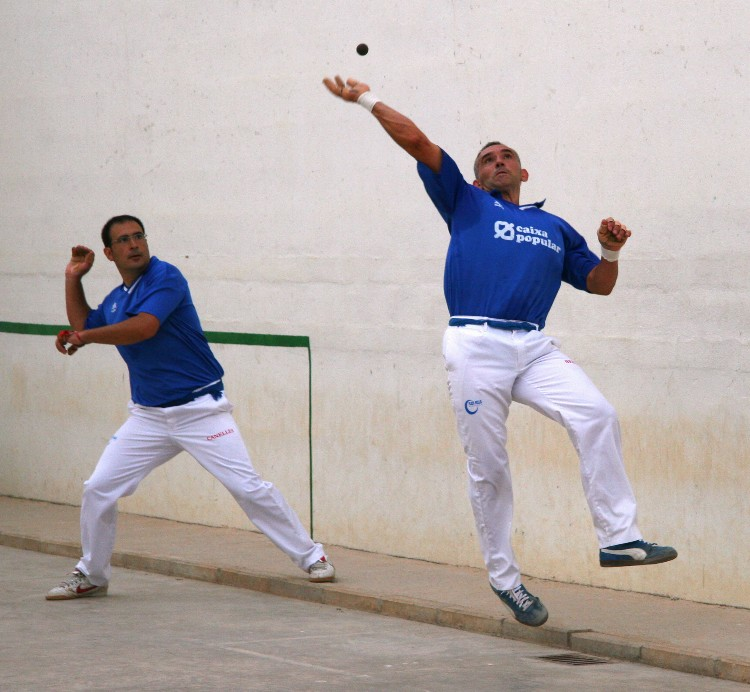
Valencian pilotaris playing Galotxa

This list is ordered by varieties, but it should be taken into account that the only two professional modalities are Escala i corda and Raspall. So, for example, good Galotxa players used to change to Escala i corda, and retired players move to less demanding varieties as Valencian fronto.

For a complete list of professional Escala i corda players see ValNet, the company that contracts all of them.

== Escala i corda ==
=== A ===
- Adrián I of Sueca
- Adrián II of Museros
- Álvaro of Faura, member of the Squad
- Aucejo of Meliana

=== B ===
- Barraca
- Boni

=== C ===
- Canana II
- Canari of Rafelbunyol
- Cervera of Alaquàs
- Colau of La Pobla de Vallbona

=== D ===
- Dani of Benavites, member of the Squad

=== E ===
- Espínola of Albal
- Eusebio of Riola

=== F ===
- Fèlix of Dénia
- Fredi of Valencia, member of the Squad

=== G ===
- Genovés I of Genovés, member of the Squad
- Genovés II of Genovés, member of the Squad
- Grau of Valencia, member of the Squad

=== H ===
- Héctor of La Vall de Laguar, member of the Squad
- Herrera of Beniparrell

=== J ===
- Javi of Massalfafar
- Jesús of Silla
- Juliet of Alginet

=== L ===
- León of Genovés

=== M ===
- Melchor of Benavites
- Mezquita of Vila-real, member of the Squad
- Miguel of Petrer
- Miguelín of Valencia

=== N ===
- El Nel of Murla
- Núñez of Quart de Poblet

=== O ===
- Oltra of Genovés
- Oñate of Massamagrell

=== P ===
- Pasqual II of La Pobla de Vallbona, member of the Squad
- Pedrito of Valencia
- Pedro of Valencia, member of the Squad
- Pere of Pedreguer
- Pigat II of Genovés, ex-member and coach of the Squad
- Pigat III of Genovés
- Primi of Gata de Gorgos
- Puchol of Vinalesa

=== Q ===
- Alberto Arnal, el Xiquet of Quart

=== R ===
- Raül II of Godelleta, member of the Squad
- Ribera II
- Rovellet of Valencia

=== S ===
- Salva of Massamagrell
- Sarasol I of Genovés, member of the Squad
- Sarasol II of Genovés, member of the Squad
- Solaz of Valencia
- Soro III of Massamagrell

=== T ===
- Tato of Altea, member of the Squad
- Tino of Valencia, member of the Squad

=== V ===
- Vicentico of Moncofa
- Víctor of Valencia
- Voro of Montserrat

=== X ===
- Terenci Miñana, el Xiquet of Simat

== Galotxa ==
=== F ===
- Ferdi of Godelleta, member of the Squad

== Llargues ==
=== D ===
- Dani of La Nucia, member of the Squad
- David of Petrer, member of the Squad

=== J ===
- Jan of Murla, member of the Squad

=== M ===
- Màlia I of La Vall de Laguar, member of the Squad
- Martínez of El Campello, member of the Squad

=== S ===
- Santi of Finestrat, member of the Squad

=== T ===
- Tonico, member of the Squad

=== X ===
- Emili Revert, el Xiquet of Llanera

== Raspall ==
=== A ===
- Agustí
- Alberto of Aielo de Malferit
- Armando of Bicorp

=== B ===
- Batiste
- Batiste II

=== C ===
- Carlos of Oliva
- Coeter I of Simat de la Valldigna
- Coeter II of Simat de la Valldigna

=== D ===
- Dorín of Xeraco

=== E ===
- Francisquet

=== G ===
- Galán
- Gorxa

=== J ===
- Juan of Genovés
- Juan Gracia

=== L ===
- Leandro I
- Leandro II
- Leandro III
- Loripet of Aielo de Malferit

=== M ===
- Malonda IV of Oliva
- Martí
- Morera
- Moro of Alcàntera de Xúquer

=== P ===
- Pigat I of Genovés

=== S ===
- Sanchis of Oliva
- Sariero

=== V ===
- Vilare

=== W ===
- Waldo of Oliva, member of the Squad

== See also ==
- Valencian Pilota Squad
- ValNet
  - Players of the ValNet firm
- List of Valencian trinquets
