= Valencian Pilota Squad =

The Valencian Pilota Squad are the Valencian pilota professional or amateur players chosen to take part in the Handball International Championships representing Spain, even though all of them are Valencians and they use the Valencian flag,.

This is the list of the players:

== 2007 Valencian Squad ==
Handball International Championships, 2007

  - picture
- Coach: Pigat II of El Genovés
- David of Petrer, amateur
- Ferdi of Godelleta, amateur
- Héctor of Meliana, amateur
- Jan of Murla, amateur
- Màlia I of La Vall de Laguar
- Mario of El Campello, amateur
- Martínez of El Campello, amateur
- Nacho of Beniparrell, amateur
- Pasqual of La Pobla de Vallbona
- Santi of Finestrat, amateur

=== Trophies ===
- Winner of International game
- Runner-up of Llargues
- Absolute champion

=== Blog ===
- (in Catalan) Tagarinet's weblog supporting the Selecció at Belgium

== 2006 Valencian Squad ==
- Coach: Pigat II of El Genovés
- Álvaro of Faura
- Dani of La Nucia, amateur
- David of Petrer, amateur
- Genovés II of El Genovés
- Martínez of El Campello, amateur
- Pasqual of La Pobla de Vallbona
- Raül II of Godelleta
- Santi of Finestrat, amateur
- Tato of Altea

== 2005 Valencian Squad ==
- Coach: Pigat II of El Genovés

== 2004 Valencian Squad ==
- Coach: Pigat II of El Genovés
- Álvaro of Faura
- Dani of La Nucia, amateur
- David of Petrer, amateur
- Emilio, amateur
- Jan of Murla, amateur
- Genovés I of El Genovés
- Grau of València
- Jan of Murla
- León of El Genovés
- Màlia of La Vall de Laguar, amateur
- Martínez of El Campello, amateur
- Santi of Finestrat, amateur
- Sarasol II of El Genovés

=== Trophies ===
- Llargues World champion

== 2003 Valencian Squad ==
- Coach: Pigat II of El Genovés
- Álvaro of Faura
- David of Petrer, amateur
- Grau of València
- Jan of Murla, amateur
- Màlia of La Vall de Laguar, amateur
- Martínez of El Campello, amateur
- Santi of Finestrat, amateur
- Sarasol II of El Genovés

=== Trophies ===
- International fronton European champion
- International game European champion
- Llargues European runner-up

== 2002 Valencian Squad ==
- Coach: Viñes
- Álvaro of Faura
- Grau of València
- Màlia of La Vall de Laguar, amateur
- Martínez of El Campello
- Pigat II of El Genovés
- Santi of Finestrat, amateur
- Sarasol II of El Genovés, best player
- Vicente of Alaquàs

=== Trophies ===
- International fronton World champion
- International game World champion
- Llargues World champion

== 2001 Valencian Squad ==
- Coach: Viñes
- Dani of Benavites
- David of Petrer, amateur
- Esteban, amateur
- Grau of València
- Jan of Murla, amateur
- Martínez of El Campello, amateur
- Sarasol I of El Genovés
- Sarasol II of El Genovés

=== Trophies ===
- International fronton European champion
- International game European champion
- Llargues European runner-up

== 2000 Valencian Squad ==
- Coach: Viñes
- Dani of Benavites
- David of Petrer, amateur
- Grau of València
- Jan of Murla, amateur
- Màlia of La Vall de Laguar, amateur
- Martínez of El Campello, amateur
- Mengual, amateur
- Mezquita of Vila-real
- Montesa, amateur
- Paco, amateur
- Pigat II of El Genovés
- Sarasol I of El Genovés
- Sarasol II of El Genovés
- Víctor of València
- Waldo of Oliva

=== Trophies ===
- Llargues World champion

== 1999 Valencian Squad ==
- Coach: Viñes
- David of Petrer, amateur
- Grau of València, best player
- Jan of Murla, amateur
- Martínez of El Campello
- Mengual, amateur
- Pigat II of El Genovés
- Puchol of Vinalesa
- Sarasol I of El Genovés
- Sarasol II of El Genovés

=== Trophies ===
- Llargues European champion

== 1998 Valencian Squad ==
- Coach: Vicent Alzina
- Fredi of València
- Grau of València, best player
- Martínez of El Campello
- Mezquita of Vila-real
- Pedro of València
- Pigat II of El Genovés
- Puchol of Vinalesa
- Sarasol I of El Genovés
- Sarasol II of El Genovés
- Tino of València

=== Trophies ===
- Llargues World champion

== 1997 Valencian Squad ==
- Coach: Vicent Alzina
- Fredi of València
- Grau of València
- Martínez of El Campello, amateur
- Pigat II of El Genovés
- Sarasol I of El Genovés
- Sarasol II of El Genovés

== 1996 Valencian Squad ==
- Coach: Vicent Alzina
- Edi
- Fredi of València
- Genovés I of El Genovés
- Grau of València
- Mezquita of Vila-real
- Paco, amateur
- Pigat II of El Genovés
- Puchol of Vinalesa
- Sarasol I of El Genovés
- Sarasol II of El Genovés

=== Trophies ===
- Llargues World champion

== 1995 Valencian Squad ==
- Coach: Vicent Alzina

== 1994 Valencian Squad ==
- Coach: Vicent Alzina
- Edi
- Genovés I of El Genovés
- Grau of València
- Màlia of La Vall de Laguar, amateur
- Pigat II of El Genovés
- Sarasol II of El Genovés
- Tonico of Murla, amateur

=== Trophies ===
- International game European runner-up
- Llargues European runner-up

== 1993 Valencian Squad ==
- Coach: Vicent Alzina
- Florencio of Altea, amateur
- Genovés I of El Genovés
- Grau of València
- Pigat I of El Genovés
- Sarasol I of El Genovés, best player
- Sarasol II of El Genovés
- Tonico of Murla, amateur

=== Trophies ===
- Llargues champion
