= List of Valencians =

This is a list of notable Valencian people (people from the Land of Valencia).

== Religious figures ==
- Juan Andrés (1740–1817), jesuit
- Cosme de Torrès (1510–1570), missionary
- Saint Louis Bertrand (1526–1581), saint
- Saint Francis Borgia (1510–1572), saint
- Saint Vincent Ferrer (1350–1419), saint
- Pope Alexander VI (1431–1503), pope
- Pope Callixtus III (1378–1458), pope
- Canut of Bon (1846–1896), Spanish preacher in Chile

== Politicians ==
- José Luis Ábalos (born 1959), politician
- Carmen Alborch (1947–2018), politician
- Rita Barberá Nolla (1948–2016), politician
- Joan Calabuig (born 1960), politician
- Agustí Cerdà i Argent (born 1965), politician
- Josep Guia (born 1947), politician
- Joan Lerma (born 1951), politician
- María Sornosa Martínez (born 1949), politician
- Ximo Puig (born 1959), politician

== Artists ==
- José Benlliure y Gil (1858–1937), painter
- Mariano Benlliure (1862–1947), sculptor
- Santiago Calatrava (born 1951), architect
- Carmen Calvo (born 1950), conceptual artist
- Victoria Civera (born 1955), painter, photographer, sculptor and installation
- Vicente de Espona (1918–1995), painter and sculptor
- Juana Francés (1924–1990), painter
- Victoria Francés (born 1982), illustrator
- Vicente Masip (1506–1579), painter
- Ignacio Pinazo Camarlench (1849–1916), painter
- Joaquín Sorolla y Bastida (1863–1923), painter
- Alonso Sánchez Coello (1531/2–1588), painter

== Musicians ==
- Ester Andujar (born 1976), singer
- Nino Bravo (1944–1973), singer
- Joaquín García de Antonio (c. 1710 – 1779), composer
- José Herrando (1720/1721–1763), violinist and composer
- Jose Iturbi (1895–1980), pianist
- Amparo Iturbi (1898–1969), pianist
- María Teresa Oller (1920–2018), composer and folklorist
- Joaquín Rodrigo (1901–1999), composer
- Concha Piquer (1908–1990), singer
- Camilo Sesto (1946–2019), singer
- Francisco Tárrega (1852–1909), guitarist

== Sports/athletics ==
- Ruth Aguilar (born 1975), handball player and paralympic athletics competitor
- Ivana Andrés (born 1994), football player
- Roberto Bautista Agut (born 1988), tennis player
- José Cabanes (born 1981), pilotari
- Paco Cabanes Pastor (1954–2021), pilotari
- Alberto Arnal (1913–1966), pilotari
- Raúl Bravo (born 1981), football player
- Ana Carrascosa (born 1980), judoka
- Ángel Casero (born 1972), cyclist
- Miguel de las Cuevas (born 1986), football player
- Alex Debón (born 1976), motorcycle racer
- Asunción Domenech (born 1967), volleyball player
- Héctor Faubel (born 1983), motorcycle racer
- David Ferrer (born 1982), tennis player
- Juan Carlos Ferrero (born 1980), tennis player
- Sergio Gadea (born 1984), motorcycle racer
- Ruth García (born 1987), football player
- Alfred Hernando (born 1957), pilotari
- Vicente Grau Juan (born 1968), pilotari
- Vicente Iborra (born 1988), football player
- Elena López (born 1994), rhythmic gymnast
- Jorge Martínez, Aspar, (born 1962), motorcycle racer
- Anabel Medina Garrigues (born 1982), tennis player
- José Jorge Mezquita García (born 1967), pilotari
- Lola Ochoa (born 1978), wheelchair tennis player
- Juanma Ortiz (born 1982), football player
- Julio Palau Lozano (1925–2015), pilotari
- Arantxa Parra Santonja (born 1982), tennis player
- Susana Pareja (born 1973), handball player
- Mercedes Peris (born 1985), swimmer
- Mónica Pont (born 1969), long-distance runner
- María Monica Merenciano (born 1984), judo athlete
- José Francisco Molina (born 1980), football player
- Jaume Morales Moltó (born 1973), pilotari
- Lydia Morant (born 1990), swimmer
- Concepción Montaner (born 1981), basketball player
- Anna Montañana (born 1980), track and field athlete
- Silvia Navarro (handballer) (born 1979), handball player
- Álvaro Navarro Serra (born 1973), pilotari
- Anna Sanchis (born 1987), cyclist
- Enric Sarasol (born 1964), pilotari
- José María Sarasol (born 1970), pilotari
- Arturo Tizón (born 1984), motorcycle racer
- Juan Francisco Torres (born 1985), football player
- Ana María Tostado (born 1971), volleyball player
- Mateo Túnez (born 1989), motorcycle racer
- Ángel Rodríguez (born 1985), motorcycle racer
- Vicente Rodríguez (born 1981), football player
- Antonio Reig (born 1932), pilotari
- Lola Riera (born 1991), field hockey
- Francisco Rufete (born 1976), football player
- Nicolás Terol (born 1988), motorcycle racer

== Literature ==
- Vicente Blasco Ibáñez (1867–1928), writer
- Guillén de Castro y Bellvis (1569–1631), writer
- Isabel-Clara Simó (1943–2020), writer
- Toni Cucarella (born 1959), writer
- Trini de Figueroa (1918–1972), romance novelist
- Joan Fuster (1922–1992), writer
- Gaspar Gil Polo (1530?–1591), writer
- Miguel Hernández (1910–1942), poet
- Maria Ibars i Ibars (1892–1965) writer and teacher
- Ausiàs March (1397?–1459), writer
- Juan Jose Marti (1570?–1640), writer
- José Martínez Ruiz, Azorín, (1873–1967), writer
- Joanot Martorell (1413–1465), writer
- Gabriel Miró (1879–1930), writer
- María Mulet (1911–1982), writer
- Vicent Partal (born 1960), journalist
- Joan Roís de Corella (1435–1497), writer
- Jordi de Sant Jordi (1390?–1424?), writer
- Maximiliano Thous Orts (1875–1947), writer
- Isabel de Villena (1430–1490), writer
- Cristóbal de Virués (1550–1614), writer

== Acting/performance/film ==
- Helena Cortesina (1903–1984), film director, actor, producer
- Nacho Duato (born 1957), dancer
- Antonio Ferrandis (1921–2000), actor
- Amparo Fortuny, film director
- Antonio Gades (1936–2004), dancer
- Luis García Berlanga (1921–2010), film director
- María Luisa Merlo (born 1941), actress
- Susi Sánchez (born 1955), actress
- Milena Smit (born 1996), actress

== Academics ==
- Al-Shatibi (died 1388), Islamic scholar
- Jaime Caruana (born 1952), economist
- Antonio José Cavanilles (1745–1804), botanist
- Estrella Durá (born 1963), psychologist
- Ibn Jubayr (1145–1217), geographer
- Manuel Sanchis i Guarner (1911–1981), philologist
- Álvaro Pascual-Leone (born 1961), neurologist
- Enric Valor i Vives (1911–2000), philologist
- Ingar Roggen (born 1934), Norwegian sociologist
- Pedro Solbes (born 1942), economist
- Cristina Lafont (born 1963), philosopher

== Other ==
- Cayetano Ripoll (1778–1826), schoolmaster
- Vicente Rojo Lluch (1894–1966), army officer
- Joan Lluís Vives (1492–1540), humanist

== See also ==
- List of Spaniards
