= Pasqual Sanchis Moscardó =

Pasqual Sanchis Moscardó (born 1963 in El Genovés) was a Valencian pilota professional player known as Pigat II. Son of the Raspall player Pigat I and brother of Pigat III, Pasqual has been a renowned "dauer" in the Escala i corda variety. He retired in 2000, but he keeps working for the Valencian Pilota Federation as the coach of the Valencian Pilota Squad, where he was a relevant player in the International Championships. Pigat II is also a technical assistant of the pilota company ValNet, and a "trinqueter" of some trinquets.

== Trophies ==
=== As a pilotari ===
- Winner of the Campionat Nacional d'Escala i Corda 1985 and 1987
- Runner-up of the Campionat Nacional d'Escala i Corda 1989
- Winner of the Circuit Bancaixa 1993, 1995 and 1996
- Runner-up of the Circuit Bancaixa 1994 and 1999
- Runner-up of the Trofeu Individual Bancaixa 1998 and 1999.

Handball International Championships

- Runner-up of Llargues and International game at the European Championship, France 1994
- Winner of Llargues at the World Championship, Spain 1996
- Winner of Llargues at the World Championship, France 1998
- Winner of Llargues at the European Championship, Italy 1999
- Winner of Llargues at the World Championship, Spain 2000

=== As a coach ===
- Winner of the Frontó and International game at the European Championship, France 2003
- Runner-up of Llargues, France 2003
- Winner of Llargues at the World Championship, Italy 2004
- Winner of the International game at the European Championship, Belgium 2007
- Runner-up of Llargues, Belgium 2007
- Absolute champion, Belgium 2007
