= Genovés =

Genovés may refer to:

== Places ==
- El Genovés, Valencia, town at the Valencian Community, Spain.

== Persons ==
- Paco Cabanes Pastor, Genovés I, Valencian pilotari.
- José Cabanes, Genovés II, Valencian pilotari.
- Santiago Genovés, Mexican anthropologist
