= Xato de Museros =

Spanish Valencian pilotari (1932–2021)

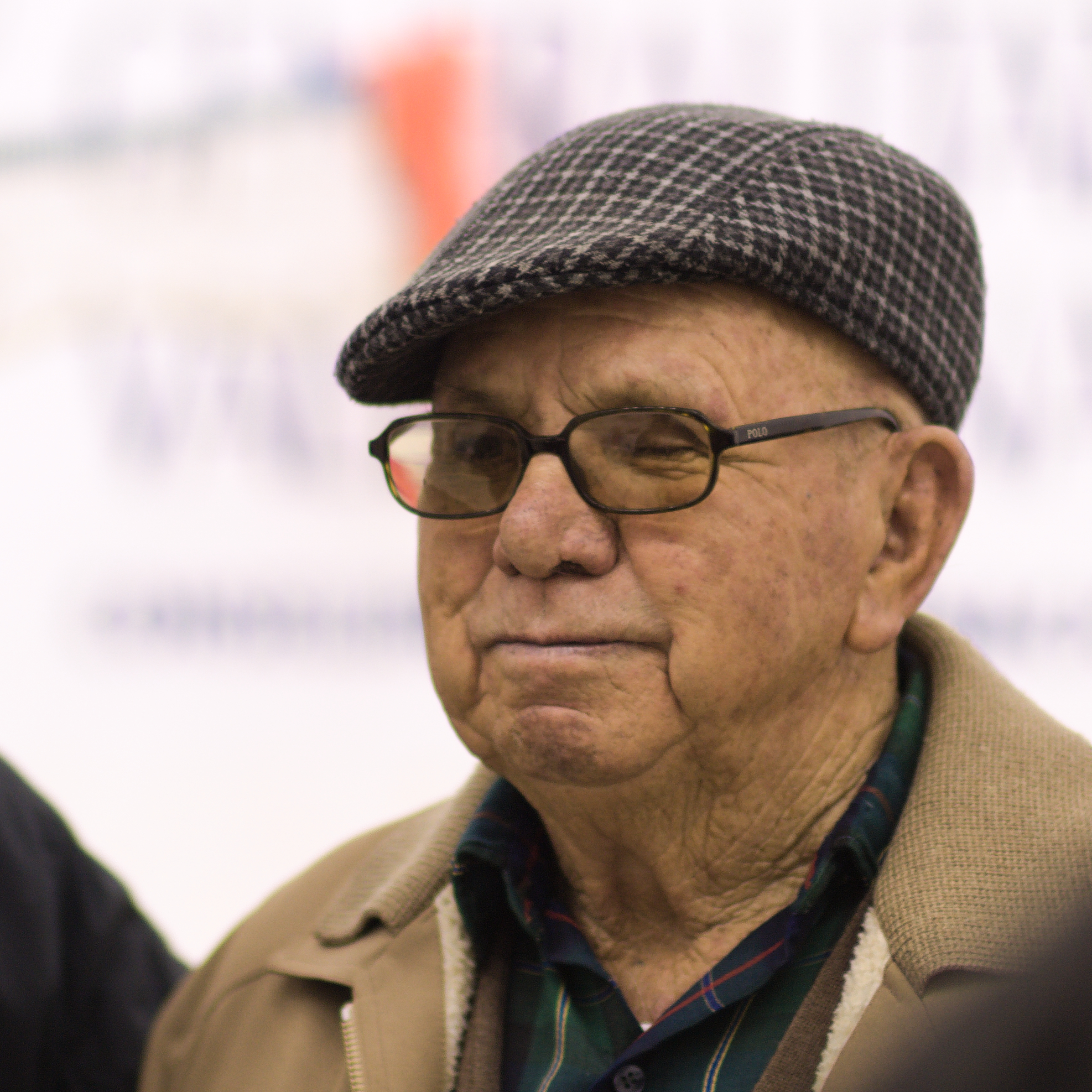
Xato de Museros

Vicent Ruiz Sanfélix, better known as Xato de Museros (1932 – 22 February 2021) was a Spanish Valencian pilotari considered the best pointer and midfielder in history, and who together with Ferreret and Ruiz de Museros formed the trio de ferro ("iron trio") during the 1950s.

Born in Museros, Valencian Community, Spain, he made his debut in Massamagrell in 1948, when he went to a game as a member of the audience and was invited to complete a trio. He performed well and was soon called to debut in Pelayo trinquet. He retired on 27 March 1976, when a shot at Moncofa made him lose an eye.

Xato de Museros died on 22 February 2021.

== See also ==
- List of Valencian pilotaris
