= Handball International Championships =

The Handball International Championships are yearly held competitions where many countries and regions play the handball sports derived from the Jeu de paume.

It is organized by the International Ball game Confederation, and there are three official varieties (International fronton, International game, and Llargues), but local modalities are also played.

== Events ==
Since 1993:

- World Jeu de Paume Championship
- European Jeu de Paume Championship
- World Handball Championship
- European Handball Championship
- World Chaza Handball Championship
- World Pallapugno Championship
- World Llargues Championship
- Five Nations Championship

== Statistics ==
=== 2008 ===
Competition	Winner	Runner-up
VI Handball World Championship
Imbabura (Ecuador)
ECU

=== 2007 ===
Competition	Winner	Runner-up
VII European Championship
Nivelles (Belgium)
BEL, FRA, ITA, NLD, VLC
International fronton	France	Belgium
International game	Valencian Sel.	Netherlands
Llargues	Belgium	Valencian Sel.
Absolute champion	Valencian Sel.	

=== 2006 ===
Competition	Winner	Runner-up
VI World Chaza Handball Championship
Colombia
	Not played	

=== 2005 ===
Competition	Winner	Runner-up
VII European Championship
Belgium
	Not played	

=== 2004 ===
Competition	Winner	Runner-up
V Pallapugno World Championship
Imperia (Italy)
ARG, BEL, COL, ECU, VLC, FRA, ITA, MEX, NLD, URY
International fronton	Mexico	Argentina
International game	Italy	Belgium
Llargues	Valencian Sel.	Italy
Pallapugno	Italy	Ecuador
Absolute Champion	Italy	

=== 2003 ===
Competition	Winner	Runner-up
VI European Jeu de Paume Championship
France
FRA, VLC, ?
International fronton	Valencian Sel.	?
International game	Valencian Sel.	?
Llargues	?	Valencian Sel.

=== 2002 ===
Competition	Winner	Runner-up
IV World Handball Championship
Paraná (Argentina)
Argentina, VLC, NLD, ?
International fronton	Valencian Sel.	Argentina
International game	Valencian Sel.	Netherlands
Llargues	Valencian Sel.	Netherlands

=== 2001 ===
Competition	Winner	Runner-up
V European Championship
Netherlands
VLC, ITA, NLD
International fronton	Valencian Sel.	Italy
International game	Valencian Sel.	Netherlands
Llargues	Netherlands	Valencian Sel.

=== 2000 ===
Competition	Winner	Runner-up
III Llargues World Championship
València (Spain)
ARG, BEL, COL, ECU, VLC, FRA, ITA, MEX, NLD, URY
Llargues	Valencian Sel.	Netherlands

=== 1999 ===
Competition	Winner	Runner-up
IV European Championship
Imperia (Italy)
VLC, FRA, ITA, NLD
International game	Italy	?
Llargues	Valencian Sel.	Netherlands

=== 1998 ===
Competition	Winner	Runner-up
II World Llargues Championship
Maubeuge (France)
BEL, COL, ECU, VLC, FRA, ITA, NLD
Llargues	Valencian Sel.	France

=== 1997 ===
Competition	Winner	Runner-up
III European Championship
Franeker (Netherlands)
BEL, VLC, FRA, ITA, NLD
?	Netherlands	France

=== 1996 ===
Competition	Winner	Runner-up
I World Llargues Championship
València (Spain)
ARG, COL, VLC, FRA, ITA, MEX, NLD
Llargues	Valencian Sel.	Netherlands

=== 1995 ===
Competition	Winner	Runner-up
II European Championship
Italy
BEL, FRA, ITA, NLD
?	?	?

=== 1994 ===
Competition	Winner	Runner-up
I European Championship
Valenciennes (France)
BEL, VLC, FRA, ITA, NLD
Ballpelote	Belgium	Valencian Sel.
International game	France	Valencian Sel.

=== 1993 ===
Competition	Winner	Runner-up
Five Nations Championship
València (Spain)
BEL, VLC, FRA, ITA, NLD
Llargues	Valencian Sel.	Belgium

== Relevant facts of the Handball International Championships ==
- The Valencian players represent Spain, but they show the Senyera and wear suits under the name Valencian Pilota Squad.
- 1994: Belgian Handball Federation quits from the International Confederation and the country is represented by Second division players.
- 1995: The Valencian Squad doesn't take part due to an argument with the CIJB because of the kind of ball Italy proposed to play with.
- 1996: The Belgian Federation threats with fining the First division players who wanted to take part.
- 2004: The Belgian Federation allows First division players to take part.
- 2005: The European Championship should be played on Belgium, but the CIJB decides to let place to Colombia to host in January 2006 the World Championship.
- 2006: The World Championship on Colombia is not played, first due to security of the players and later due to the eruption of the Galeras volcano.

== Best players ==
Every year the most relevant players are awarded as the Best player:

- 1993: Sarasol I (Genovés, Valencia)
- 1998: Grau (València)
- 1999: Grau (València)
- 2002: Sarasol II (Genovés, Valencia)
- 2004: Silverio Deiby Mena, Colombia
- 2007: Johan van der Meulen, Netherlands

== See also ==
- Frisian handball
- Longue paume
- Valencian pilota
- Pallone
