= Paco Cabanes Pastor =

Valencian professional pilotaire (1954–2021)

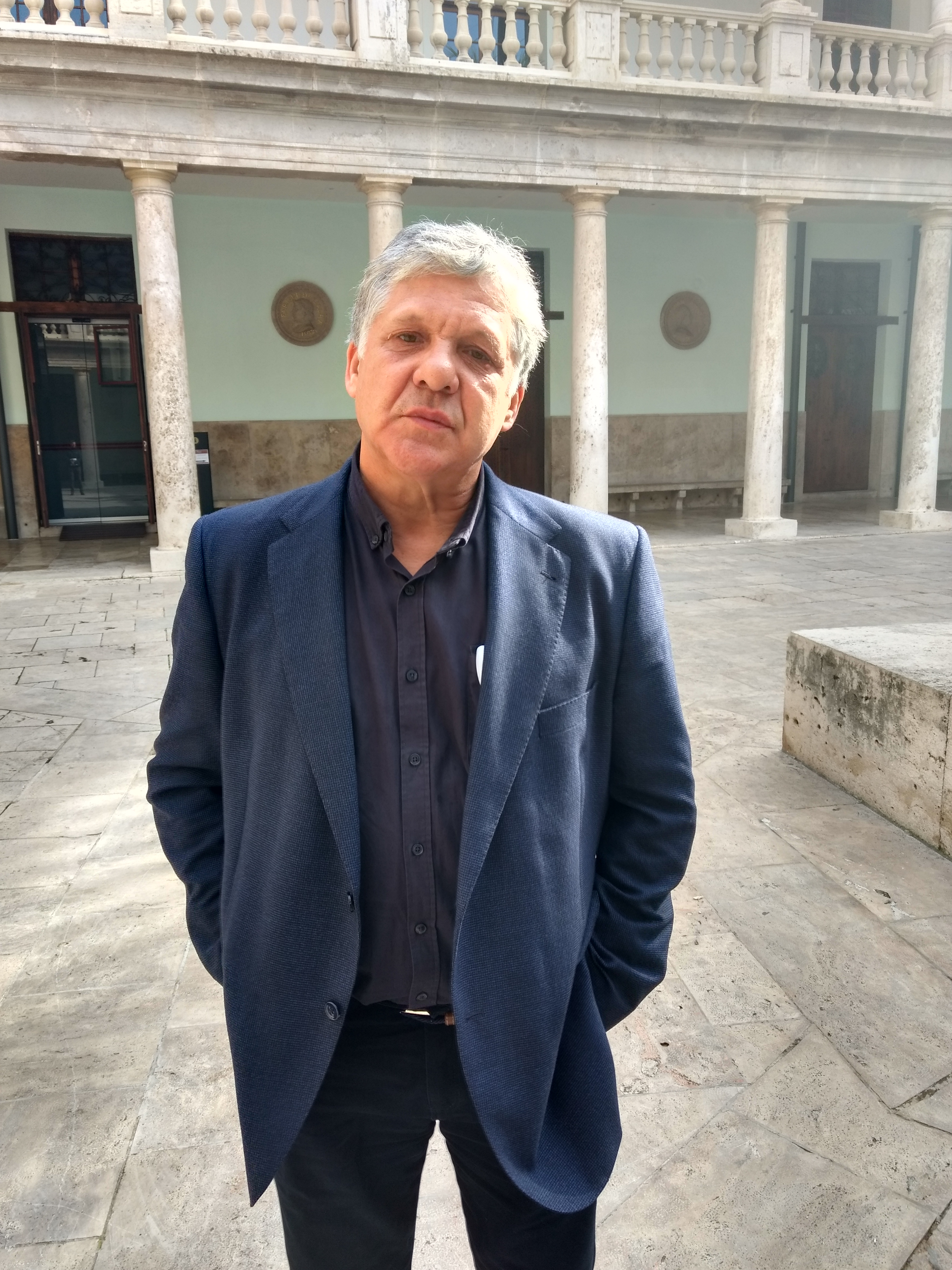
Paco Cabanes in the University of Valencia, 2017

Francisco "Paco" Cabanes Pastor (20 December 1954 – 31 July 2021) was a Spanish professional Valencian pilota player known by his town's name, Genovés I, and who has begun a pilotaris saga with his son, Genovés II. He's been regarded as one of the best players of all time, along with El Nel de Murla, Xiquet de Quart, Juliet d'Alginet and Rovellet, and he deserved to be in the Honor Gallery of the Pelayo trinquet. He's also been a member of the Valencian Pilota Squad.

== Biography ==
He was born on 20 December 1954 in Genovés, Valencia. As is usual in his town, he began playing Raspall, but when he was 17 he turned to Escala i corda, the variant which he ruled for 20 years. His arrival meant the end of Rovellet's era, and his retirement meant the beginning of Álvaro; things got complicated for great players such as Eusebio or Fredi, who had few chances to win relevant championships.

He made his debut as a dauer in 1974 at the Campionat Nacional d'Escala i Corda, and the very next year he was the winner. His superiority was so clear to everybody that organizers had to force him to play per baix (down), that is, he could only hit the ball when it had already bounced on the ground or on the walls, but never in the air. Even with his handicap, he won three more seasons. Later, for two years, he was forced to play as a mitger (a position he was unfamiliar with), but he won again.

The quality difference was so great that, in order to make betting more interesting, he had to play with his brother Pepe (who was not gifted at all) or, even, had to strike the ball only with one hand.

Genovés I retired as a professional pilotari after winning the 1995 Trofeu Individual Bancaixa final match against Álvaro, who was 20 years younger, and finally overcame 60-55.

Paco Cabanes died on 31 July 2021 at the age of 66 from cancer.

== Trophies ==
- Winner of the Campionat Nacional d'Escala i Corda 1975, 1976, 1978, 1979, 1981, 1983, 1984 and 1989
- Runner-up of the Campionat Nacional d'Escala i Corda 1977, 1980, 1985, 1986 and 1988
- Winner of the Trofeu Individual Bancaixa 1986, 1988, 1989, 1990, 1991 and 1995
- Runner-up of the Trofeu Individual Bancaixa 1992, 1993 and 1994

Handball International Championships

- Winner of the 5 Nations Championship València 1993
- Runner-up of the European Championship Valenciennes (France) 1994
- Winner of the World Llargues Championship València 1996
