= Trofeu Individual Bancaixa 2007 =

The Trofeu Individual Bancaixa 2007 is the 22nd season of the Trofeu Individual Bancaixa, the one-on-one trophy of Escala i corda, a variant of Valencian pilota.

== Pilotaris ==
=== Since Previous round ===
- Colau of La Pobla de Vallbona
- Pedro of València
- Soro III of Massamagrell
- Víctor of València

=== Since Quarter finals ===
- Álvaro of Faura
- Genovés II of Genovés
- Grau of València
- León of Genovés
- Miguel of Petrer
- Núñez of València

==== Feridors ====
- Miguelín of València, for Álvaro.
- Oltra of Genovés, for Genovés II.
- Pedrito of València, for Miguel.
- Tino of València, for Grau.

== Matches ==
=== Previous round ===
Date	Trinquet	Red	Blue	Score
2007-05-22	Massamagrell	Soro III	Víctor	35-60
2007-05-25	Sueca	Pedro	Colau	45-60

==== Notes ====
- The winner of the match Soro III and Víctor plays against Álvaro.
- The winner of the match Pedro and Colau plays against Grau.

=== Eliminatories ===
Quarter-finals
2007-06-01, Bellreguard
Genovés II	60
Núñez	35
2007-06-02, Pedreguer
Miguel	50
León	60
2007-06-06, Guadassuar
Grau	60
Colau	30
2007-06-03, Benissa
Álvaro
Víctor	injured

Semi-finals
2007-06-09, Pelayo, València
Genovés II	60
León	50
2007-06-10, Guadassuar
Grau	50
Álvaro	60

Final

=== Final ===
June 17, 2007
12:00

Álvaro	–	Genovés II
60		25

Sagunt

== Notes ==
- Unlike previous seasons, the 2007 Individual matches' first score is 15-15 jocs.
- In order to prevent mistrusts, the relevant pilotaris have a fixed feridor playing only for them.
- Quarter finals: The match Grau versus Colau is delayed from 3 June to 6th due to a slight illness of Grau.
- Quarts de final: The match Álvaro versus Víctor is not played because of a serious illness of Víctor.
