= Lycée Français d'Alicante =

Coordinates: 38.40151°N 0.41291°W

- Liceo Francés de Alicante

Location
- Main: Camino de Marco, 21 / Camí de Marco, 21 (03560) El Campello – Alicante; Picasso School: Finca Barrina - Norte, apt 2 - 16 Carretera de Callosa / Avinguda Callosa D'Ensarrià 03502 Benidorm

Information
- Website: mlfalicante.org

Lycée Français d'Alicante Pierre Deschamps (LFA; Spanish: Liceo Francés de Alicante) is a French international school in El Campello, Alicante Province, Spain. It serves maternelle/educación infantil (preschool) through lycée/bachillerato.

As of 2016 the main campus, which is adjacent to Villa Marco, has about 1,300 students. This campus is 20 hectares (49 acres) large.

The École française Pablo Picasso, an annex of the Lycée Français d'Alicante, is located in Benidorm. It is inside the Finca Barrina - Norte complex. But closed in 2018.

Campuses

== History ==
The school, which opened in 1962, was established by pied-noir people leaving Algeria. In the aftermath of the Independence of Algeria large numbers of pied-noirs settled in Alicante, leading to the establishment of the new French school.

It was initially inside an apartment building on Calle San Vicente. Until 1965 the school occupied a building in Alicante. That year it moved to a different building in Vistahermosa, Alicante. In 1970 it moved again to Albufereta, Alicante. Several pied-noirs had moved to Albufereta; 65 of them lived there in 1965. By 2001 French-speakers had a lot of influence in Albufereta and French was commonly spoken there.

In 2005 the school moved into its current location in El Campello.

== See also ==
- Liceo Español Luis Buñuel, a Spanish international school near Paris, France
