= Alfred Hernando =

Spanish handball played (born 1957)

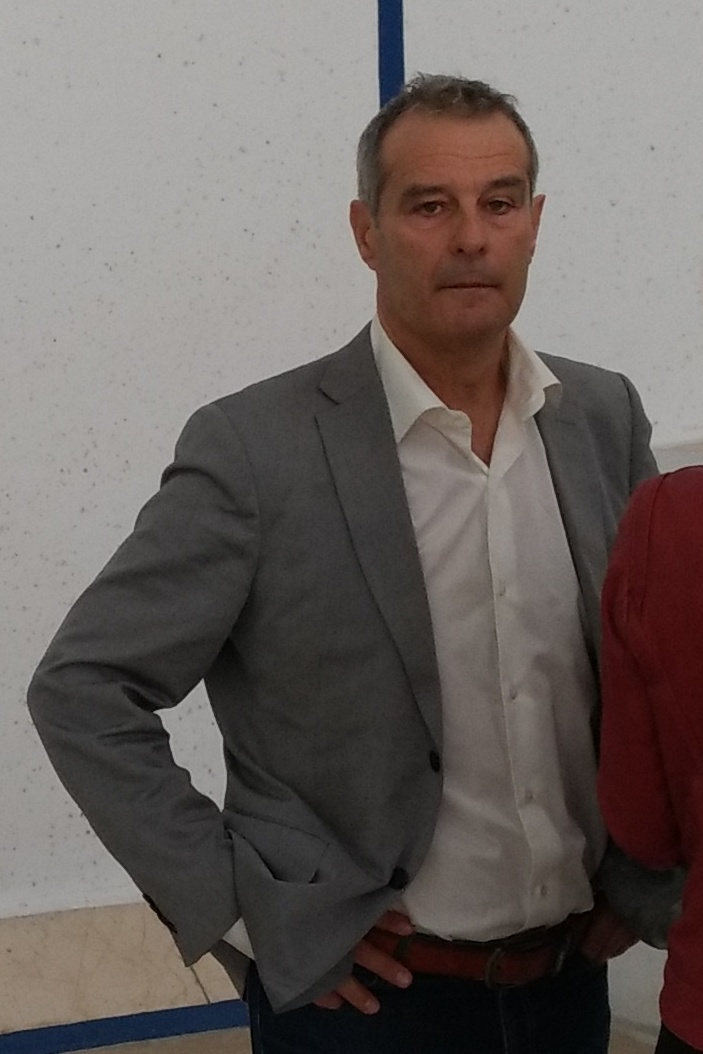
Fredi in Pelayo, 2016.

Alfred Hernando Hueso (Valencia 1957), known as Fredi, is a retired Valencian pilota professional player working now as a pilota businessman. He was a member of the Valencian Pilota Squad.

Fredi had a successful career at the Valencian trinquets as an Escala i corda escalater. His active years coincided with Genovés I, one of the best players of all times, so Fredi was lucky of playing with him but unlucky of not being able to win more competitions because of him.

When he retired as a player he decided to renew the structures of the Valencian pilota with a new trophy, the Escala i corda Circuit Bancaixa league for professional players, with his own company, Frediesport, and the Valencian bank Bancaixa.

In 2005 he joined the ex-pilotari Daniel Ribera, Ribera II, and the Gandia trinquet owner, Emili Peris, to create a brand new company, ValNet, which contracts all professional players.

== Trophies ==
- Winner of the Campionat Nacional d'Escala i Corda 1980, 1986, 1988 and 1991
- Runner-up of the Campionat Nacional d'Escala i Corda 1982, 1983, 1984 and 1987
- Winner of the Trofeu Individual Bancaixa 1987
- Runner-up of the Trofeu Individual Bancaixa 1988

Handball International Championships

- Winner of the Llargues World Championship, Maubeuge (France), 1998.
