= John O'Mill =

Dutch poet

A terrible infant called Peter,
sprinkled his bed with a gheter.
His father got whoost,
took hold of a cnoost
and gave him a pack on his meter.

Johan van der Meulen (11 January 1915, Breda – 13 September 2005, Breda), better known by his pseudonym John O'Mill (a jocular translation of his given name, as if O' stands for "of the"), was a Dutch author mostly known for his wordplay and limericks, and for using a macaronic combination of Dutch and English words and sentence structures he called "Double Dutch" (itself a pun on various meanings of this phrase). Double Dutch appears English, but it cannot be fully understood without knowledge of Dutch, because it is based on the literal translation of Dutch idioms into English and the similarity in sound of certain words and expressions. O'Mill, who was until 1975 a teacher of English at the public high school "Rijks-HBS" at Breda (North Brabant), was inspired by the clumsy English used by his students.

== Books ==
- Lyrical Laria (1956)
- Rollicky Rhymes (1957) in Dutch and double Dutch (D.&d.D.)
- Curious Couplets (1958) & preposterous prose (D.&d.D.)
- Tafellarijmvet (1958) (table drawer rhyming grease)
- Bonny Ballads (1959) medley of verse and worse
- Mixture (1961)
- Louter Leuter (1962) (nothing but chatter)
- Cocktail (1963)
- Medical mess (1965)
- Puure Piffel (1965) (pure drivel)
- Complex (1965)
- Op deuren en glazen (1973) (on doors and window panes)
- Popsy Poems (1975) pre-popsylated poetry (D.&d.D.)
- Literary Larycook Dutch:Lariekoek = nonsense(1977)
- Loony lyrics (1981)
- Penfruit Prullaria (1983) Dutch:Prullaria = bits and pieces
- Boloney belletrie (1984) (become sleepy unless med. description)
- Apologische spreekwoorden (1984) (apological proverbs)
