= Albert Arnal =

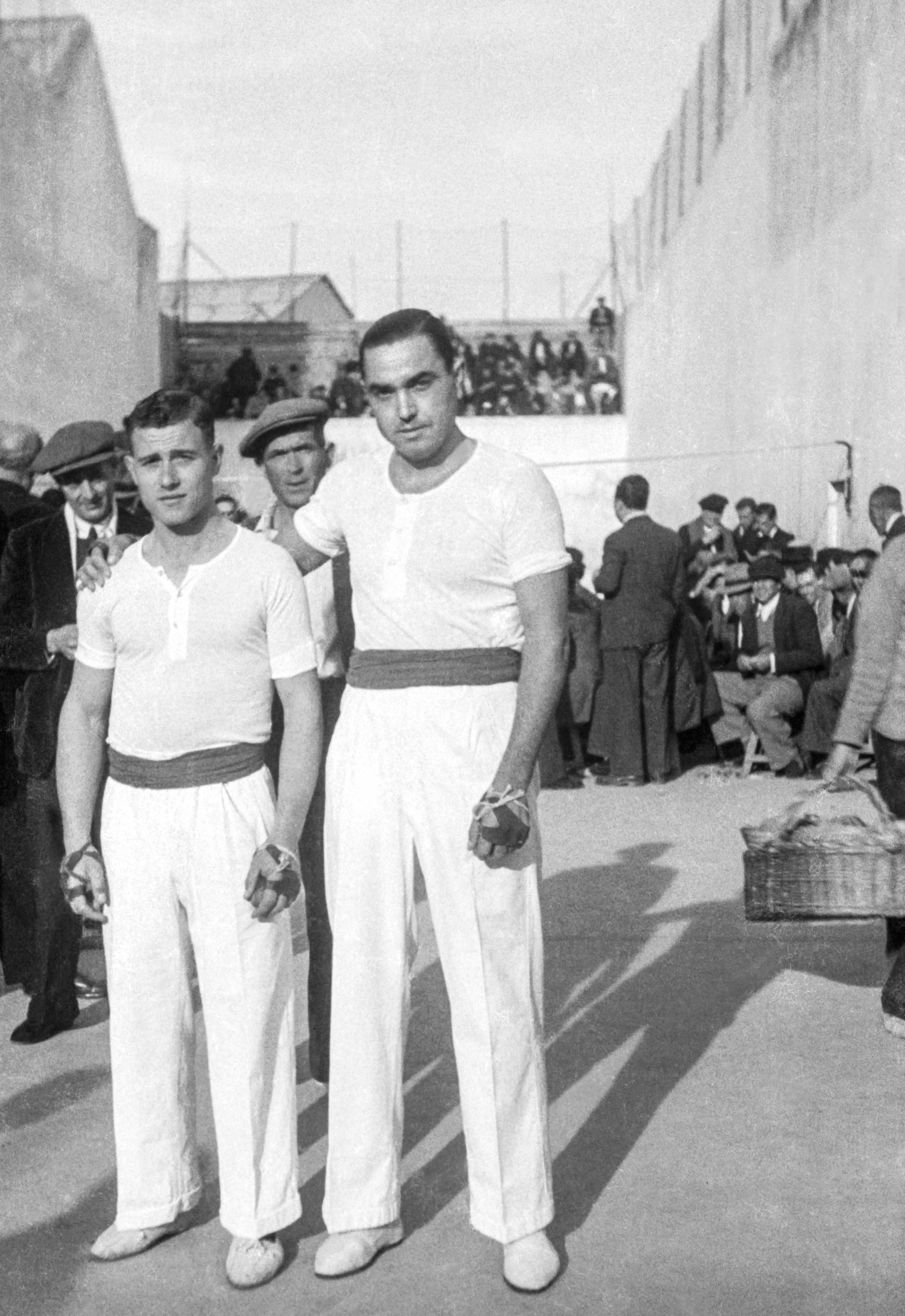
Image of Juliet the pilot and the Xiquet de Quart, taken by Ismael Latorre Mendoza on 11-24-1946, in the Trinquet d'Alginet.

Albert Arnal (Serra (Camp de Túria) 31 January 1913 – Quart de Poblet (Horta Oest) 1 May 1966), known as Quart (or Xiquet de Quart) was the Valencian pilota ruling dauer player during the 1930s. His mastery caused him to be rewarded by having a picture on the Honor Gallery of the Pelayo trinquet. On 1991 the Valencian Pilota Federation awarded him with the Golden medal.

He began playing at the Manises trinquet and got to be the main player at the Pelayo trinquet during the 1930s and 1940s. He was announced with a not too-gifted punter against the most powerful trios (such as Llíria I, Mora de Montcada and Micalet de Paterna). Due to disagreements with the Pelayo managers, he turned to play at the Grau Llevant trinquet. On 1948, almost at the end of his career, his returning to Pelayo against Juliet d'Alginet resulted in a large audience.

Quart was a strong and tall player, powerful enough that he could throw the vaqueta ball easily to the galleries (it must be taken into account that those balls then weighed 32 gr. and were not so fliers as the actual ones). His opponents complained that it was very difficult to get a quinze against him due to his technique. His dau hit was so violent that he was forbidden to play the first dau ball of every quinze so that the rival team could, at least, send the ball back.

Until Juliet appeared he had no opponent at his level and he was the main player until the 1940s. On 1984 he deserved a tribute match at Pelayo, which was packed.
