= European Handball Championship =

European Handball Championship may refer to

- European Men's Handball Championship
- European Women's Handball Championship
