= Asunción Domenech =

Spanish volleyball player (born 1967)

Personal information
- Full name: Asunción Domenech Domínguez
- Nationality: Spanish
- Born: June 8, 1967 (age 59); Valencia, Spain

National team
Spain

Asunción Domenech Domínguez (born 8 June 1967) is a Spanish former volleyball player who competed in the 1992 Summer Olympics.
