= O' =

O', O’, O`, O´, O‘ or Oʻ may refer to:

- the anglicized variant of the patronymic term "Ó" in Irish names (like in O'Sullivan)
- short for "of" or "on" (like in Pot o' Gold, John o' Groats or o'clock)
- a misspelling of the letter "O" with a diacritic like Ó, Ò, or Ơ.
- Oʻ, a letter used in the pre-2026 orthography of the Uzbek language
- O′ (with prime symbol) represents the glottalized or creaky vowel "/o̰/" in Taa language
- ’O or ’o is the masculine singular article in Neapolitan (as in ’O sole mio "my sunshine")

== See also ==
- ’ (apostrophe)
- ` (grave accent)
- ´ (acute accent)
- ‘ (quotation mark)
- ′ (prime symbol)
- O (disambiguation)
