= International game =

Ball game modality

The International game (Valencian: joc internacional, IPA: [ˈdʒɔk ˌinteɾnasi.oˈnal]) is a ball game that is related to many sports derived from and similar to Jeu de paume. It is played in the Handball International Championships by teams from the Americas and Europe.

== History ==
The International game was created so that players from similar sports could play with some minimal changes in their respective rules by the International Ball game Confederation.

At first, it was made up of the following European ball game federations:

- Belgium: Balle pelote
- France: Longue paume
- Italy: Pallone
- Valencian Community: Llargues
- Netherlands: Frisian handball

Later on, some countries from the Americas joined:

- Argentina
- Colombia: Chazas
- Ecuador
- Mexico: Pelota tarasca
- Uruguay

== Playing area ==
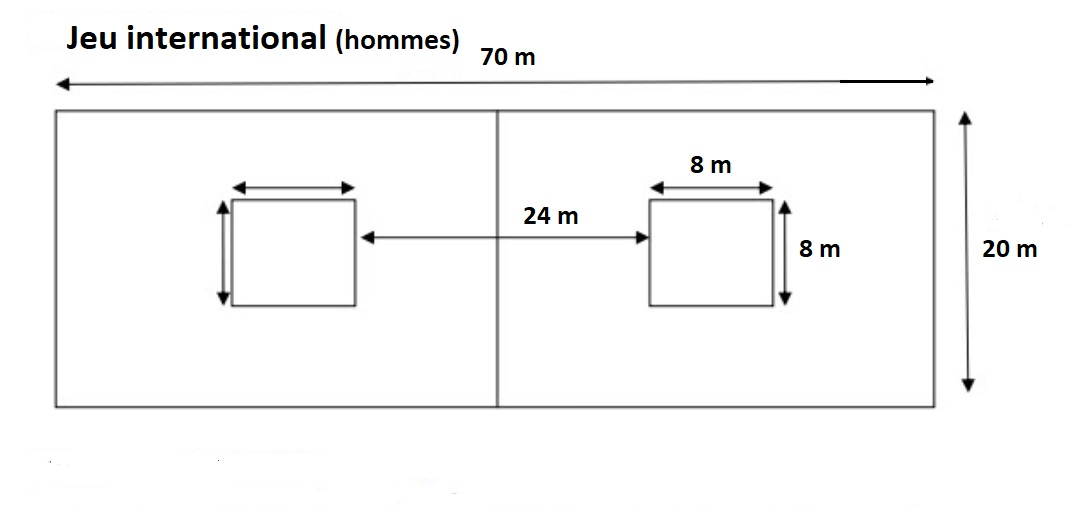
Playing area

International game is played on a rectangular, flat concrete surface, within a 70 x 20 meter box for the men's category, and within a 50 x 14 meter box for the women's category. The endings of this rectangle are the "service" and the "receive" lines. In the "service" field there is an 8 x 8 meter (men's) or 6 x 6 meter (women's) area known as the "service box".

== Ball ==
The International game is played with a shaved tennis ball. Each ball game is played with a different ball, and when writing the rules of this new sport, a ball players could feel comfortable with was searched for. The ball is not as small and resistant as the Valencian badana or as big and heavy as the Italian one.

== Rules ==
Two teams formed by 5 players play to score more games by hitting a ball with the hand.

Every point consists in four points: 15, 30, 40 and game.

Every point begins when a rotating player from the team at the "service" field throws the ball from the "service box", after that players hit it in order to send it behind the opponent's end line or, at least, move it as far as possible.

If on the serve the ball surpassed the midfield the ball must be hit on the air or after the first rebound on the ground, but if the ball arrives bouncing before the midfield then there is no one-rebound limit.

3 points are involved by party. The team which gains the victory, obtains 2 points if the score is 6–3, 6–4 or 6–5 (1 point for the looser) but the team obtains 3 points if the score is 6–0, 6–1 or 6–2.

The champion of this modality is the team which has most point.

== Other games created by C.I.J.B ==
=== International competition of Llargues ===
The llargues is a Valencian pilota modality which takes place in the street. The Internacional Ball Game Federation established rules to make an international sport by making him play on a ground used for the Balle pelote.

When a team gets two "lines", or the score is "40 and 1 line", both teams must change their respective midfields.

The point may be attain directly or postponed.

- Direct points are obtained:
  - When the ball surpasses the opponent's end line.
  - When an opponent player hits the ball but it doesn't advance.
  - When a player hits the ball with any other part of the body but the hand, except in case of blocking the ball.
- Postponed points are those got when winning the "line".

Lines: Lines are a signal resting on a side of the field marking the place where a ball has been blocked so that it didn't advance any more in the defending team's area. When teams swap midfields (and, by that, passing to serve) the new serving team tries to attain the lines they did at the "receive field". In order to get them they must throw the ball surpassing that line so that it's blocked behind that line, then the postponed point is scored. If they don't get to send it so far or it's blocked in their own side of the line then it's the opponent team who obtains the point.

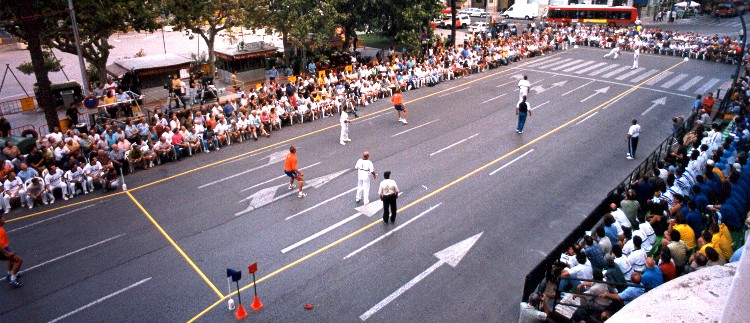
Dutch and Valencian Pilota Squad - Dia de la Pilota 2006 (València - Spain)

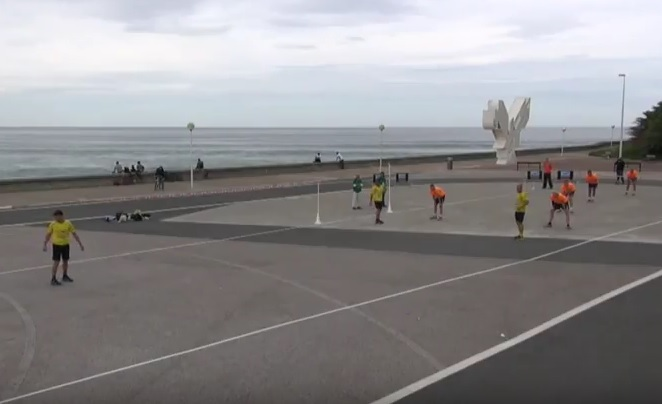
Champions League Final of Bond Luzea-Llargues - October 2016 - San Sebastián (Spain) Basroode (Belgium) / Berlikum (Netherlands) 6–3.

=== European game ===
The rectangular is 60 m long and 20 m wide with a service box 8 x 6 m. The sets will last 40 minutes.

== See also ==
- Handball International Championships
- Frisian handball
- Longue paume
- Pallone
- Valencian pilota
  - Llargues
- Ballon au poing
- Balle à la main
