= Antoni Reig Ventura =

Spanish Valencian pilota player (1932–2025)

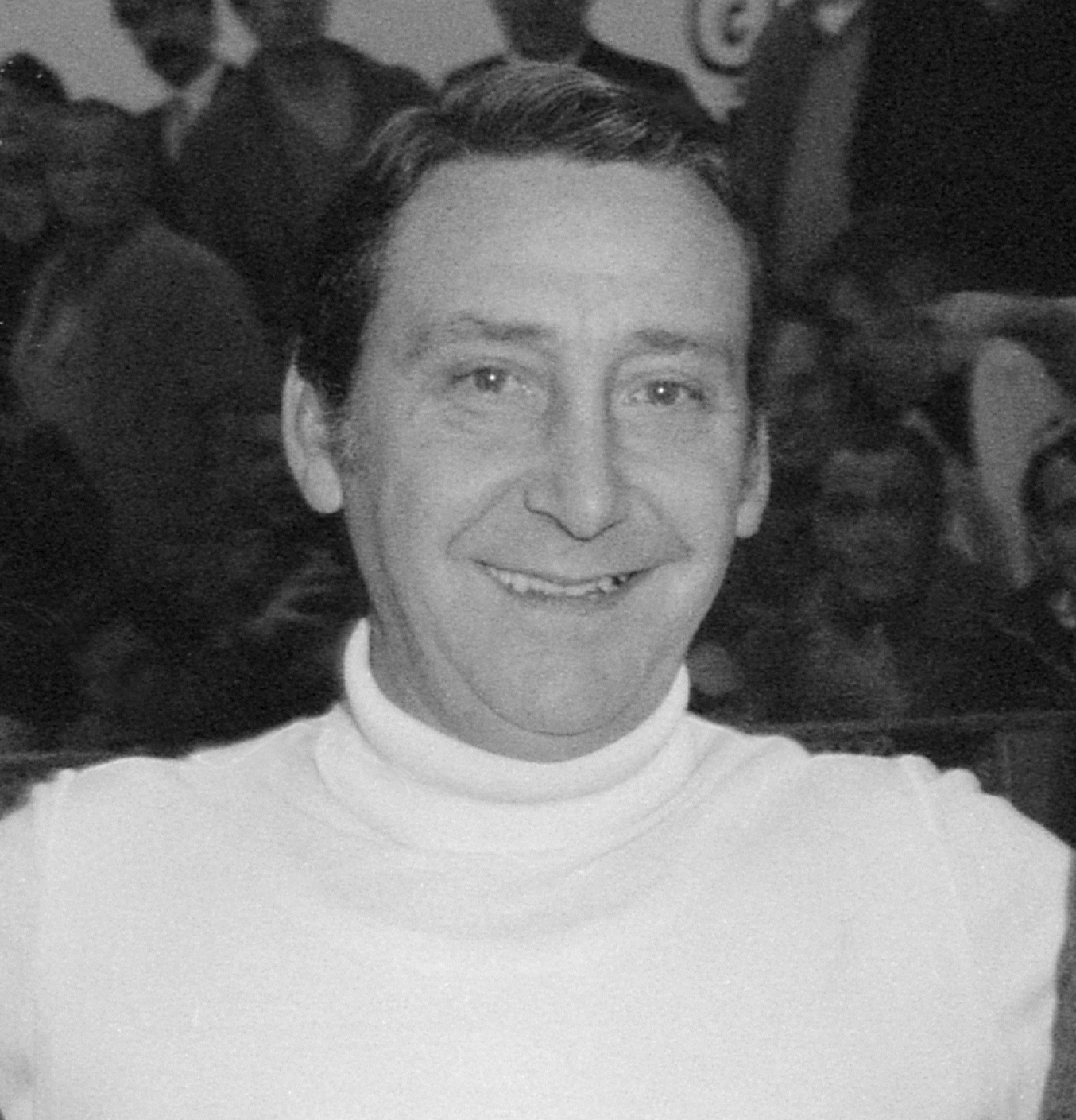
Photo of Rovellet, taken by Ismael Latorre Mendoza in 1982

Antoni Reig Ventura (1932 – January 2025), known as Rovellet, was a Spanish professional Escala i corda Valencian pilota variant player. In recognition of his mastery, he is one of only five pilotaris with a picture on Pelayo trinquet's Honor Gallery. He also has a street in Valencia named after him.

== Life and career ==
Reig Ventura's career began when he was only 15; two years later he played against Juliet d'Alginet, the number one of that time.

For many years this was the maximum level match any trinquet could host. When Juliet retired, Rovellet became the new number one until Eusebio appeared, in the 1960s.

He retired in 1979, some years after his best, but without being forced to ask for a punter partner, that is, he and a mitger player were strong enough to play levelled matches against other good duos or average trios.

Reig Ventura died in January 2025, at the age of 92.

== Trophies ==
- Winner of the Campionat Nacional d'Escala i Corda 1970
