= El Campello =

El Campello Campello
- Town and municipality
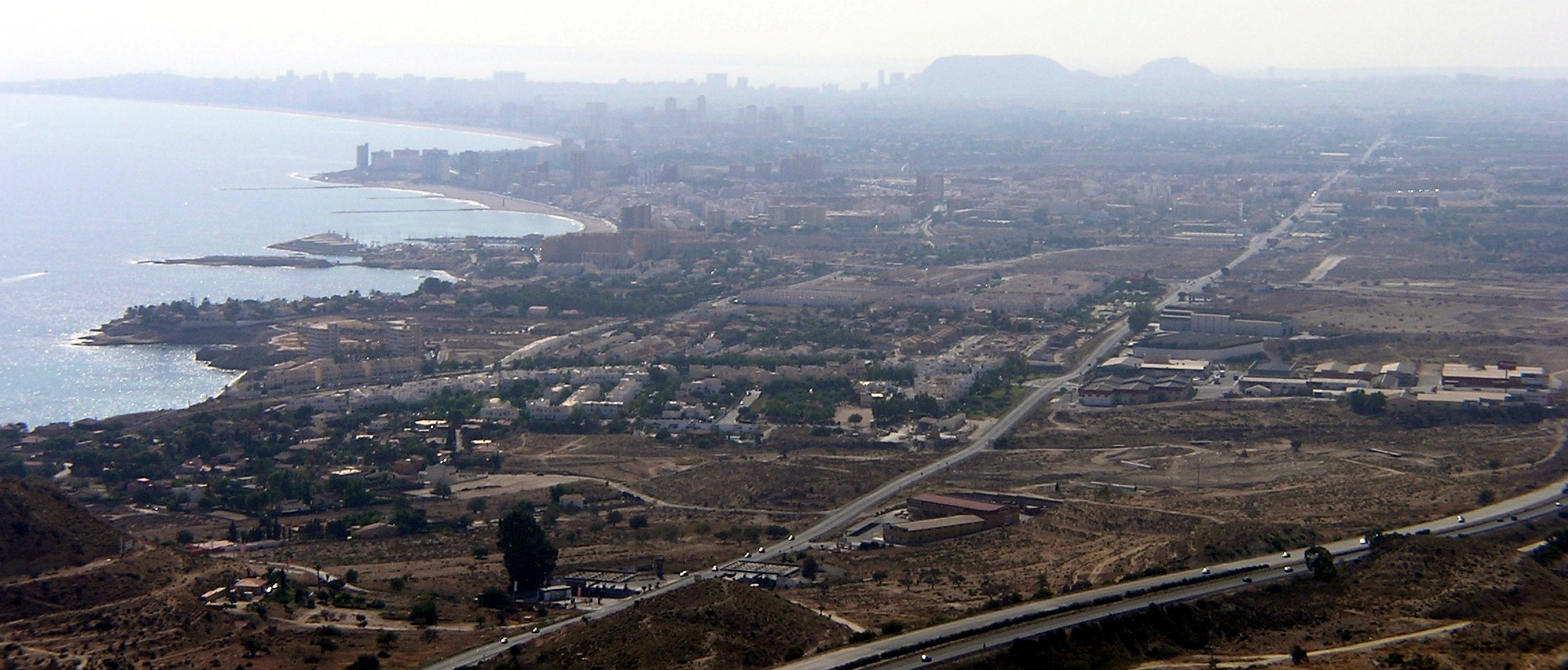

- Flag Coat of arms

- Location in Spain El Campello (Valencian Community) El Campello (Spain)
- Coordinates: 38°25′39″N 0°24′4″W
- Country: Spain
- Autonomous community: Valencian Community
- Province: Alicante
- Comarca: Alacantí
- Judicial district: Alacant / Alicante

Government
  - Alcalde (Mayor): Juan José Berenguer (2011) (PP)

Area
  - Total: 55.27 km^{2} (21.34 sq mi)
- Elevation: 26 m (85 ft)

Population (2025-01-01)
  - Total: 31,419
  - Density: 568.5/km^{2} (1,472/sq mi)
- Demonyms: campeller, -a (Val.) campellero/a (Sp.)
- Official language(s): Valencian; Spanish
- Linguistic area: Valencian
- Time zone: UTC+1 (CET)
  - Summer (DST): UTC+2 (CEST)
- Postal code: 03560
- Website: Official website

El Campello, (Note: Pronunciation of el Campello: Valencian: [el kamˈpeʎo]) also known as Campello, (Note: Pronunciation of Campello (unofficial): Spanish: [kamˈpeʎo]) is a town and municipality on the Costa Blanca of Spain, within the Valencian Community. It is a 20-minute tram ride from Alicante city. There is a busy marina and fish market. The municipality features several Mediterranean beaches.

The tower overlooking the harbour was built in the 16th century as a lookout for ships.

During October each year, the town holds its Moros i Cristians (Moors and Christians) festival. The festival includes daily "battles" through the town, where arquebuses are extensively used. There are numerous parades and late night fireworks displays. The evening parades through the centre of the town are resplendent with extravagant costumes.

== Places to visit ==
There are archaeological remains at La Illeta (or La Isleta), beside the harbour, where circular cabins dating back to 3000 BC have been found. Also known as Banyets de la Reina, the remains of Roman-era fish factories can be seen at the site.

It is an archaeological site of great importance and occupies 4,000 square meters. A number of items were discovered, including Bronze Age remains, and the remains of an important Iberian population that occupied that place during the second and third centuries BC, and the remains of a Roman villa of the second century, including four fish ponds dug into the rock of the same time (though badly eroded, yet visible), and finally the remains of an Arab occupation that was more sporadic in the Middle Ages.

== Education ==
Lycée Français d'Alicante, a French international school, is in el Campello. The school moved to el Campello in 2005.

Institut d'Educació Secundària Clot de L'Illot, a Bachillerato, for Humanities and Social Sciences.

== Gallery ==
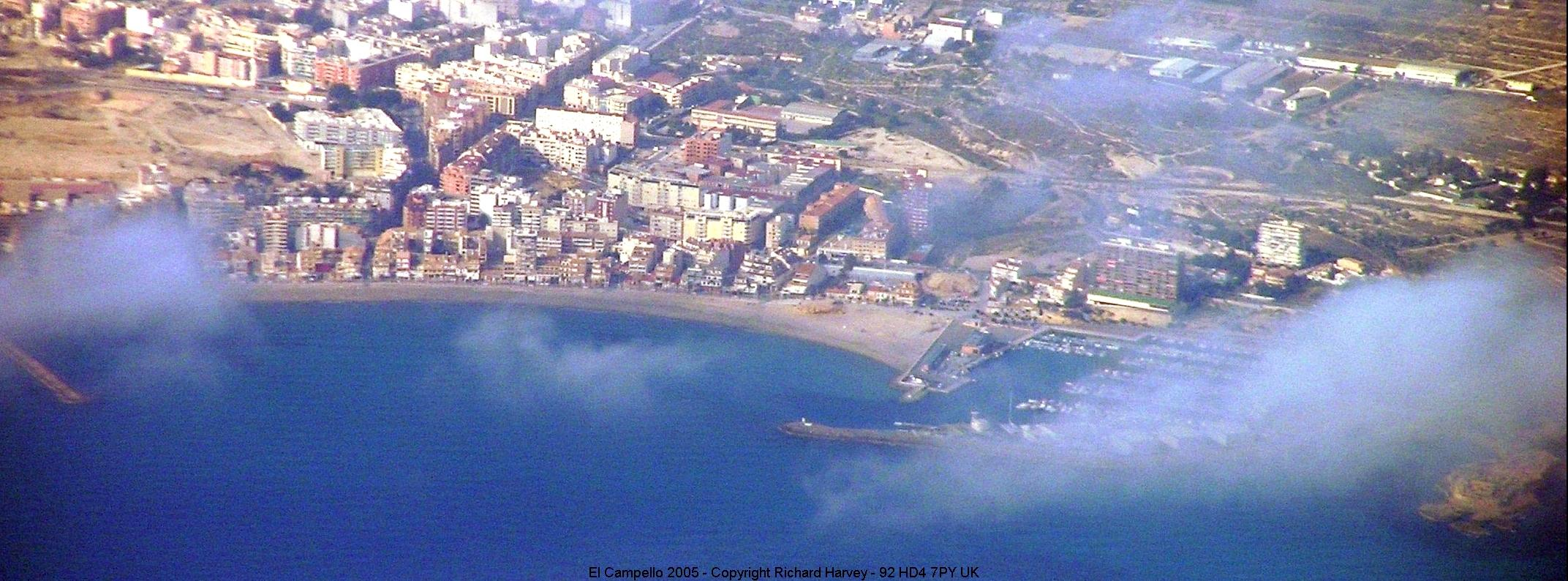
El Campello aerial image

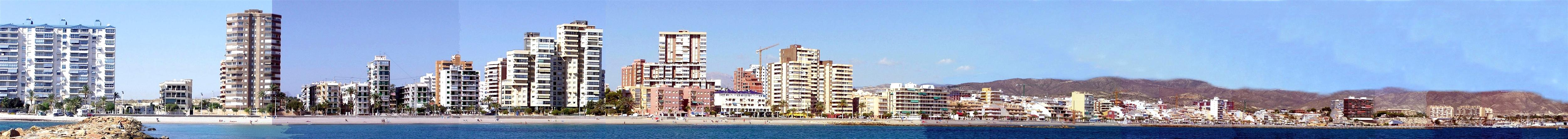
Shoreline of el Campello

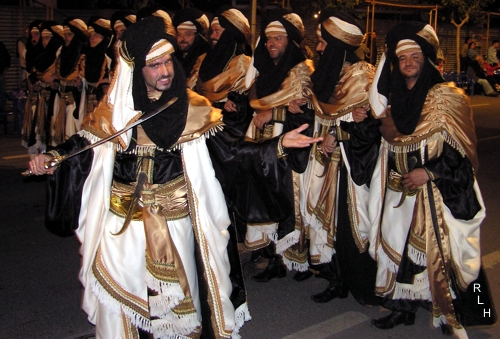
Typical Moorish costume on the parade

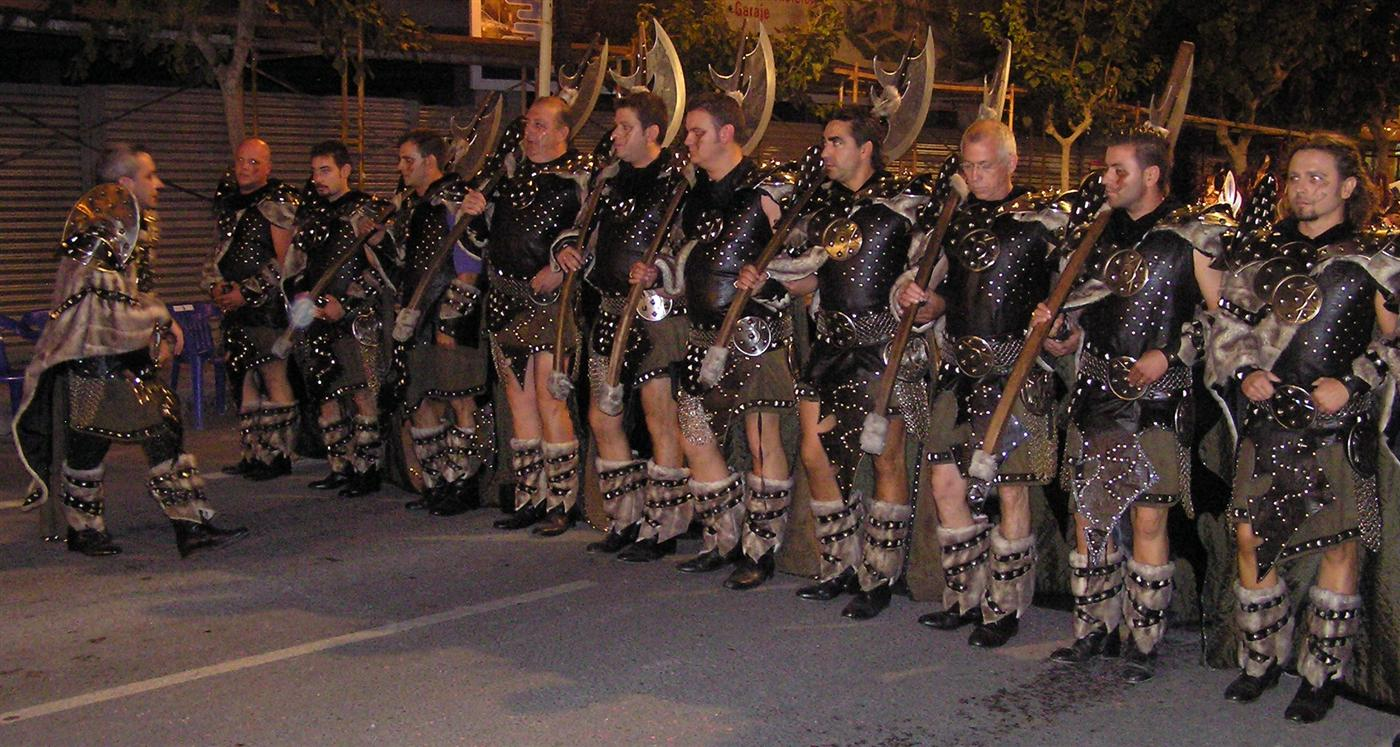
Typical Christian costume on the parade

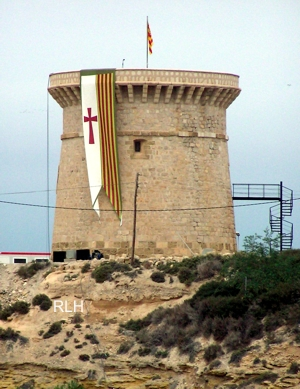
El Campello Tower

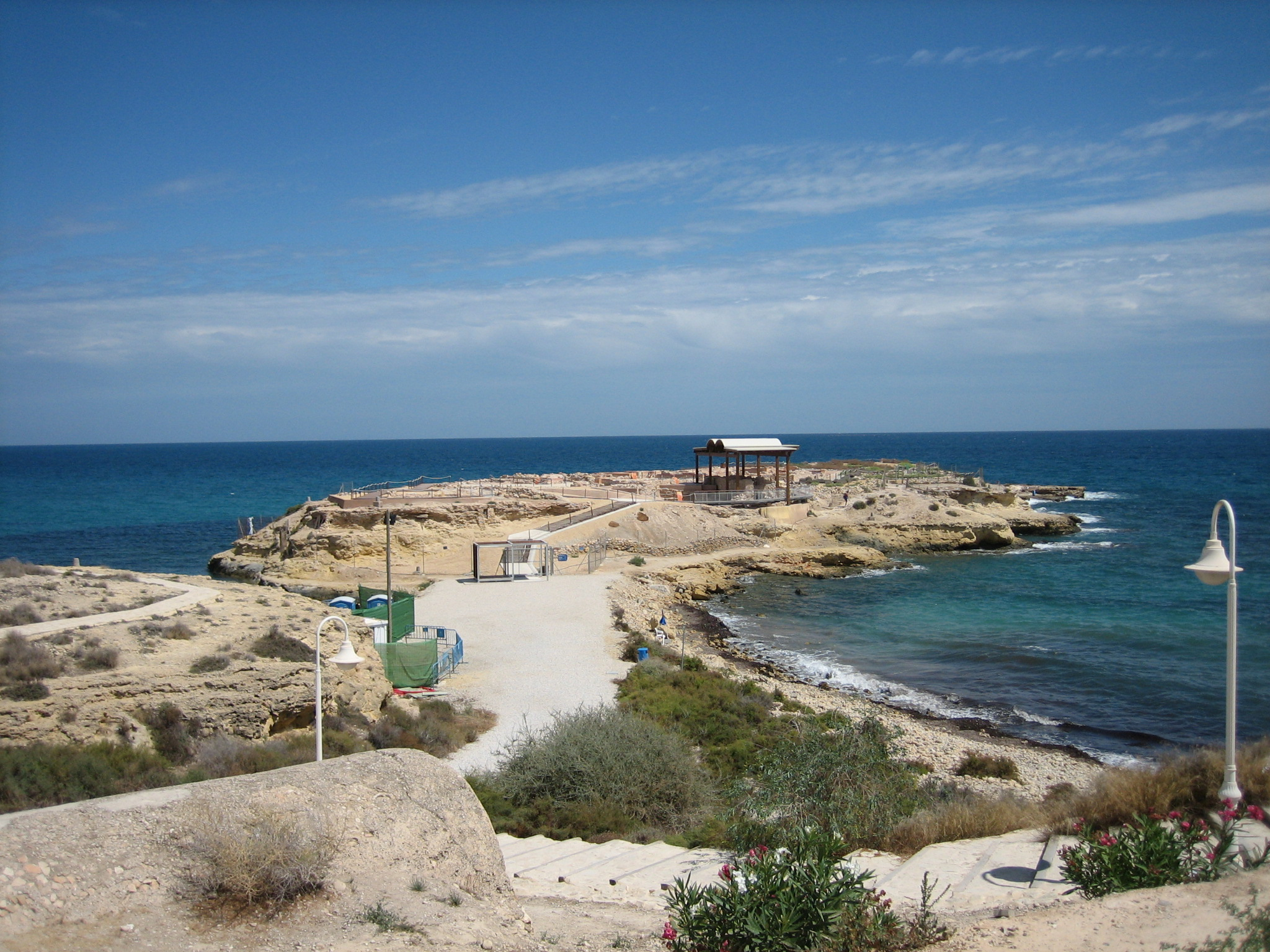
La Isleta (or La Illeta)
