= La Vall de Laguar =

- Municipality
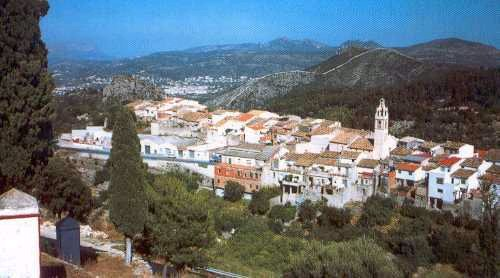

- Coat of arms

- Location within Spain Location within Valencian Community Location within Europe
- Coordinates: 38°46′37″N 0°06′36″W
- Country: Spain
- Autonomous Community: Valencian Community
- Province: Alicante
- Comarca: Marina Alta

Government
  - Type: Mayor-council government
  - Body: Ajuntament de La Vall de Laguar
  - Mayor: Francisco Gilavert (PSPV-PSOE)

Area
  - Total: 22.96 km^{2} (8.86 sq mi)
- Elevation: 450 m (1,480 ft)

Population (2025-01-01)
  - Total: 905
  - Density: 39.4/km^{2} (102/sq mi)
- Demonym(s): Laguartiano, -na (es) guarer, ra (va) vallero, -ra (es)
- Time zone: CET (GMT +1)
  - Summer (DST): CEST (GMT +2)
- Postcode: 03791

La Vall de Laguar is a chain of three village in the province of Alicante and autonomous community of Valencia, Spain. The villages are, from the lowest and first encountered if entering the Val from the town of Orba, the most usual route, Campell, Fleix and Benimaurell. The municipality covers an area of 22.96 square kilometres (8.86 sq mi) and as of 2011 had a population of 961 people.
