= Beniparrell =

- Municipality
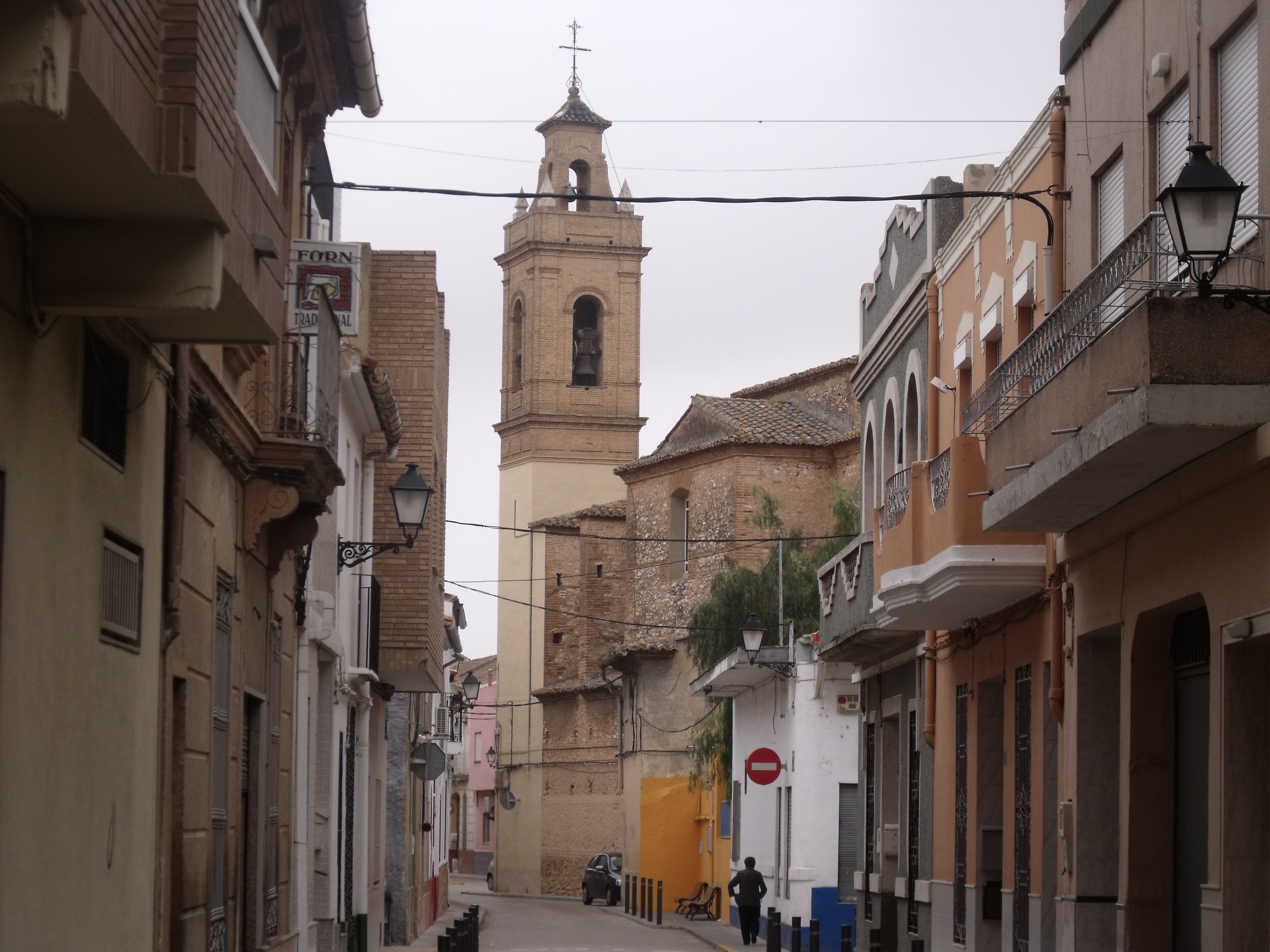

- Coat of arms

- Location in Spain
- Coordinates: 39°22′50″N 0°24′41″W
- Country: Spain
- Autonomous community: Valencian Community
- Province: Valencia
- Comarca: Horta Sud
- Judicial district: Picassent

Government
  - Alcalde: Vicente José Hernandis Costa

Area
  - Total: 3.7 km^{2} (1.4 sq mi)
- Elevation: 20 m (66 ft)

Population (2025-01-01)
  - Total: 2,108
  - Density: 570/km^{2} (1,500/sq mi)
- Demonym(s): Beniparrellí, beniparrellina
- Time zone: UTC+1 (CET)
  - Summer (DST): UTC+2 (CEST)
- Postal code: 46469
- Official language(s): Valencian
- Website: Official website

Beniparrell is a municipality in the comarca of Horta Sud in the Valencian Community, Spain.

== See also ==
- List of municipalities in Valencia
