= Murla =

Human settlement in Spain

Coordinates: 38°45′N 0°04′W

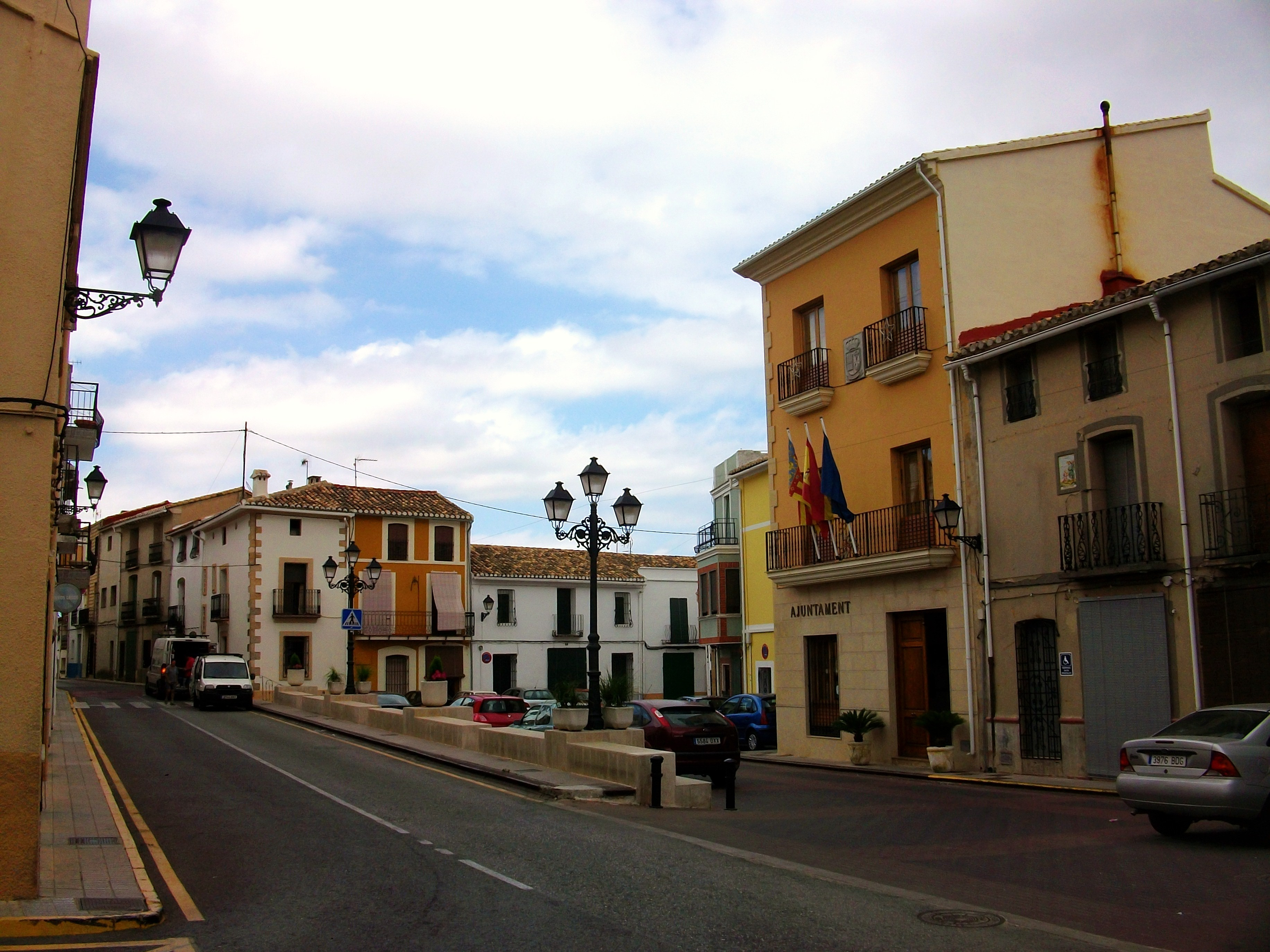

Murla's coat of arms

Murla is a village in the province of Alicante and autonomous community of Valencia, Spain. The municipality covers an area of 5.81 square kilometres (2.24 sq mi) and as of 2022 had a population of 540 people.
