= Llargues =

Modality of Valencian pilota

Llargues (Valencian pronunciation: [ˈʎaɾɣes], "long ones") is a modality of Valencian pilota played in the street between teams of three, four, or five players. To score a point, the ball must bounce beyond a line known as the foul line (located around 50 to 60 meters from the service line) or exceed a further line known as quinze, located at a distance of approximately 80 meters.

There are no professional players in this modality, but it is commonly played in towns and villages in parts of the Valencian Community, such as the Marina Alta and Baixa, l'Alacantí, l'Alcoià and the Comtat.

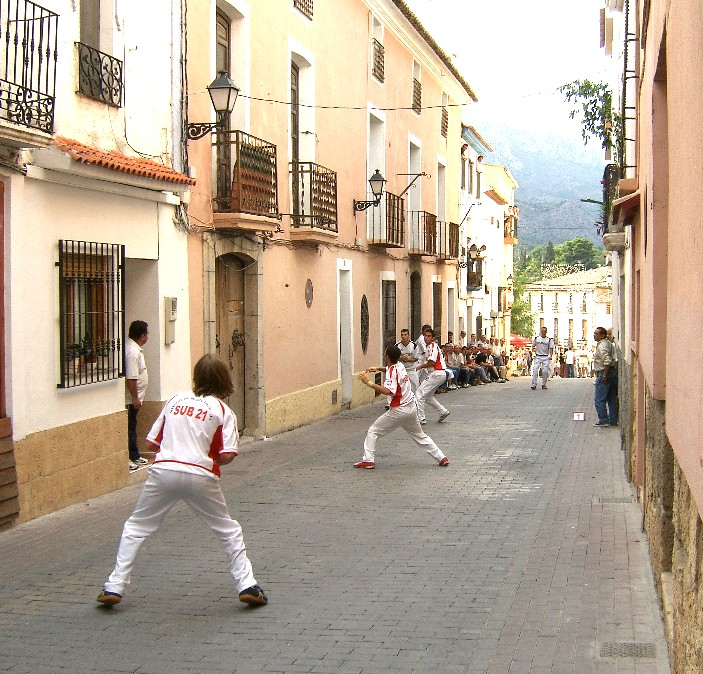
Llargues match in the streets of Polop

== Playing area ==
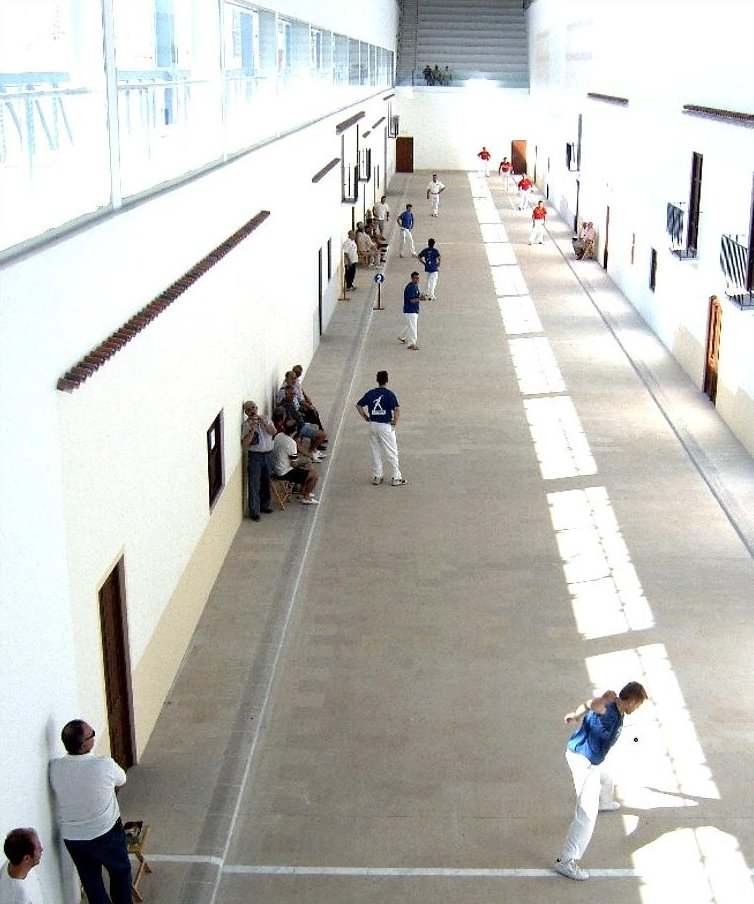
The banca serves and so begins the quinze

The playing area must be a flat, straight, long, and wide street measuring around 70 to 75 meters. In steep or tapered streets, the lower end or wider side is designated as the rest line.

The street is delimited by two ratlles, the banca and the rest, which mark the ends of the playing area. A third line, the ratlla de falta, is located approximately 40 meters from the rest and marks the minimum distance the ball must pass on the serve.

If one team is significantly stronger, a handicap may be applied in the form of moving the ratlla de banca forward to compensate for the stronger opponent’s serve.

Spectators may sit on the sidewalks and behind the end lines of the street.

== Ball ==
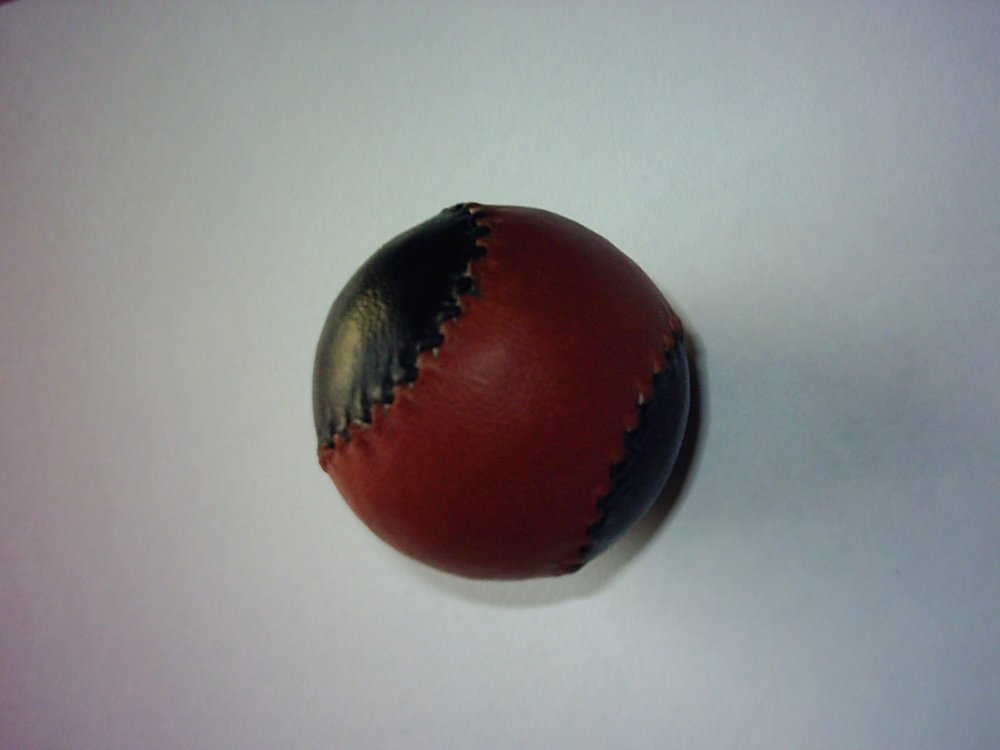
Badana ball

Llargues are played with a badana ball, which can be played without any protection. Since this sport is practiced on the streets and the bounce is very irregular this kind of ball almost does not bounce. They are cheap, so it does not matter if any ball is lost on the roofs, at another street or in any balcony (which happens often). Also, streets have plenty of irregularities such as borders or traffic signals, and many places with a different rebound (walls and doors, ground or gutter lids), that cause strange effects to the trajectory of the ball; those unexpected directions are somehow minimized by the soft rebound of the badana ball since it is made of moulding materials. Another reason to use this ball is its slowness and softness, so that it is proper for amateur or casual players.

The badana ball is made of rags with sheepskin. Weight: 39 g., diameter: 38 mm.

== Rules ==
Two teams formed by 4 or 5 players try to attain a certain score (usually 10 points) by throwing each other a ball with the hand so that the opposing team is not able to send it back. Not so long ago there was another scoring system called "up and down" (a pujar i baixar), where the team who was losing subtracted points to the winner.

Teams wear red and blue T-shirts, with red being the colour of the team allegedly stronger or favoured in the betting.

Players receive a name depending on their position on the street:

- The banca is in charge of beginning every quinze by serving, from one side of the street.
- The rest, from the other side of the street, is who usually returns the banca' serve. Both players are the stronger pilotaris.
- The mitger is in the middle of his midfield, his purpose is sending the ball as far as possible.
- The punter is in front of the opposing team or into their midfield, he must block the ball or throw it to the non-protected places.

Every point consists of four quinzes: 15, 30, val, and joc. The team who wins the joc scores a point.

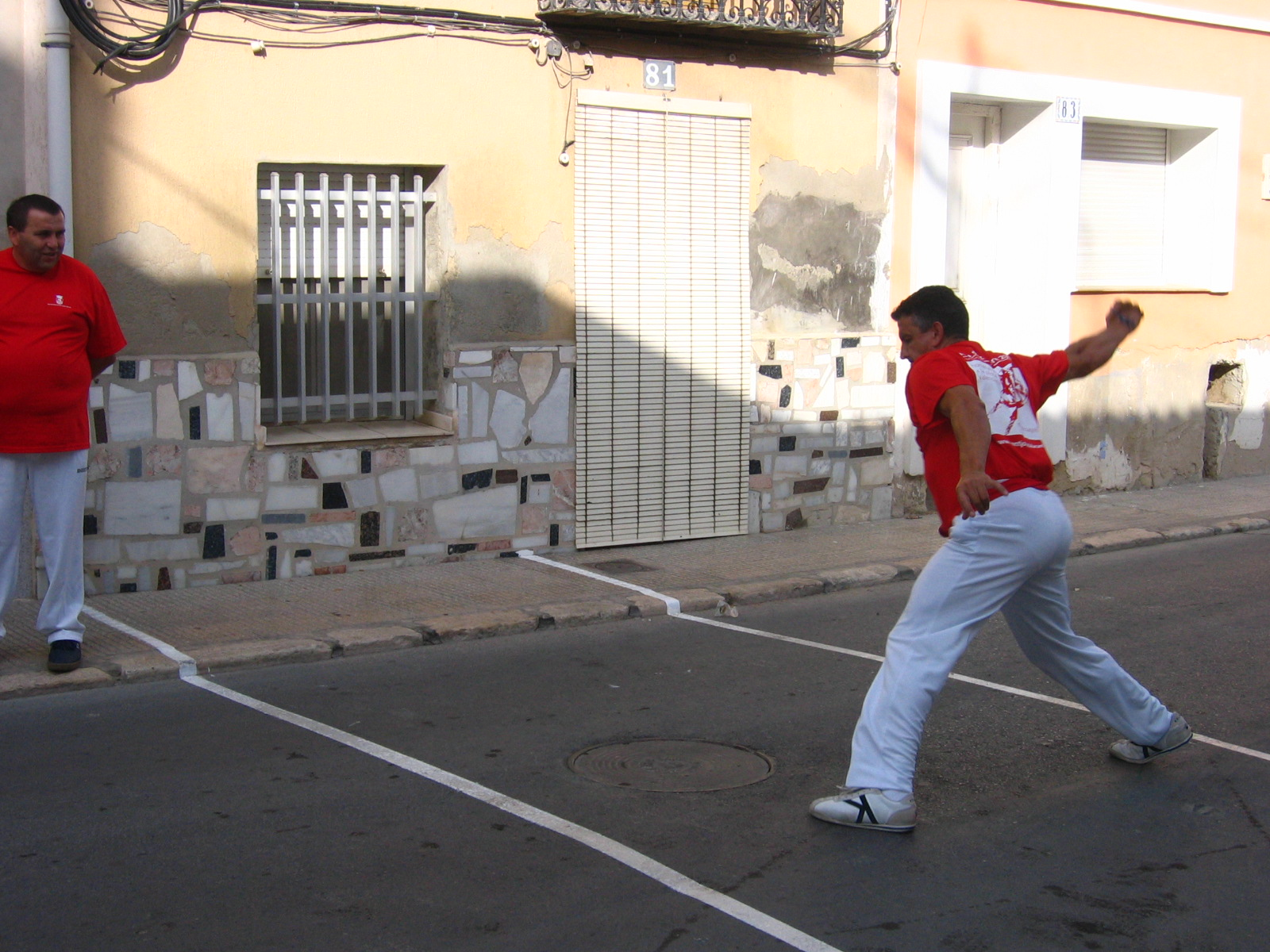
The "banca" serves

The quinze begins when the banca serves: From the other side of the banca line the player must send himself the ball and (without any bounce) hit it to throw it so that it surpasses the fault line without touching the ground, then the opposing team may hit it back or block it so that it does not advance further.

In llargues the ball must be hit with the hand when it is in the air or after its first rebound on the ground, to send it to the opposing team's field or behind the line that marks the end of the street. When the player blocks the ball he may touch it with any part of his body (but only after the second bounce), in that case a line is done on the ground (actually, a signal is placed on the sidewalk). It is the basic principle of the games of gain-ground.

The main feature of Llargues are the ratlles (Valencian for lines), the signals set in the place where the ball has been blocked every quinze. The ball may be blocked because it's been thrown to the spectators and hasn't come back to the playing area, or, more likely, because a player has chosen to stop its advance when he realized he can not hit it back properly. In case the ball gets blocked on any roof or balcony the quinze is lost for whoever sent it there.

When a team has got 2 ratlles teams change the fields; they will try to score those pending points. Also, if the banca team gets a val they must change the field, even if they have only one ratlla.

When serving, players try to get direct quinzes or win the pending ratlles. Those ratlles are now the fault line.

Direct quinzes are scored when:

- a team send the ball behind the opponent's street end line.
- or because a fault of the opponent:
  - If the ball bounces twice.
  - If a player touches the ball twice, or a player of the same team touches it after one hit.
  - If the banca player does not reach the fault line.

=== A palma ===
A palma is a Llargues variant where the only difference is the serve. Since there are so many good banques, the serving is done a palma (with the palm), that is, the arm is extended long. This way, the serving strike is not so strong and teams are likely to be more equal.

=== Perxa ===
The Perxa shares the same rules than the Llargues variant except for the serve. The serve is done from the fault line throwing the ball over a rope (as seen on the Galotxa variant) to a square drawn on the ground.

== See also ==
- International game
