= Valencian pilota =

Handball sport

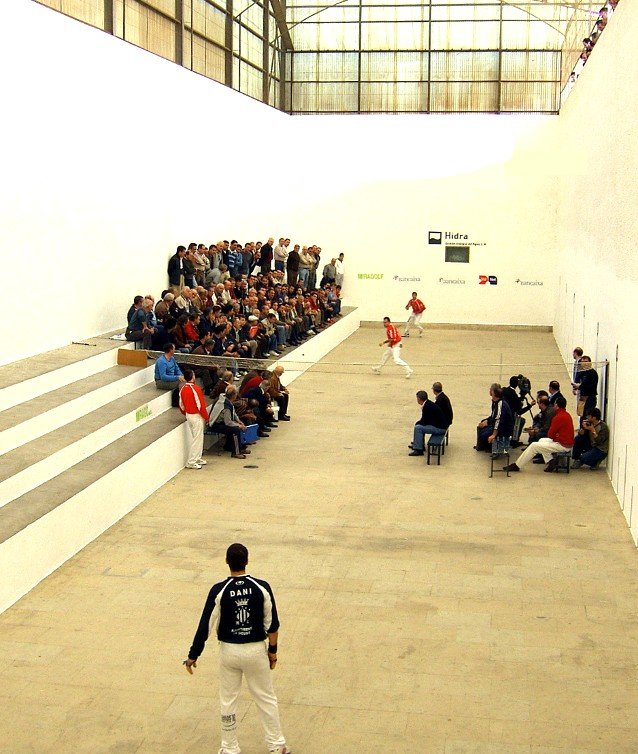
Valencian pilota match

Valencian pilota (Valencian: pilota valenciana [piˈlɔta valensiˈana], also [piˈlɔtɔ valensiˈana]; "Valencian ball") is a traditional handball sport played in the Valencian Community. Its origins are not known.

Rules variations within the generic Pilota Valenciana category are frequent from area to area but the common trait is that the ball is struck with a bare, or almost bare, hand (only minimal protection is applied in some versions of the sport). The general rule involves two teams made from two up to five players each (the numbers depend on the particular version played). Exceptionally, individual matches are also played (mostly in Escala i corda and Raspall) between the most renowned players.

The second characteristic is that it is not played against a wall. Instead, similar to modern tennis, two individuals or teams are placed face to face separated either by a line on the ground or a net in all of modern modalities except for the frontó. A distinctive trait of Valencian pilota is that the spectators are often seated or standing very close to the court which means that they may be hit by the ball and thus become an (unwilling) part of the game.

== History ==
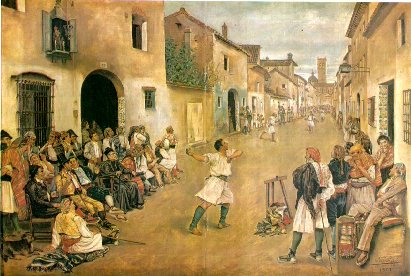
"Joc de pilota", 1881, llargues.

The origins of Valencian pilota are not known with certainty, but it is commonly supposed to have been derived from the medieval Jeu de paume along with several other European handball sports (for example the Basque laxoa, French Longue paume, Frisian handball and Italian Pallone) similar to the actual Valencian llargues variant.

Jeu de paume is documented at Paris in 1292 since there were 13 ball workshops and many tripots (courtfields); it was first played with the hands, and the scoring system was very similar to the current Valencian one. There were so many resemblances with the Valencian pilota sport that, in the 16th century, the humanist Joan Lluís Vives compared both games in his Dialogues and claimed them to be exactly the same despite some minor differences.

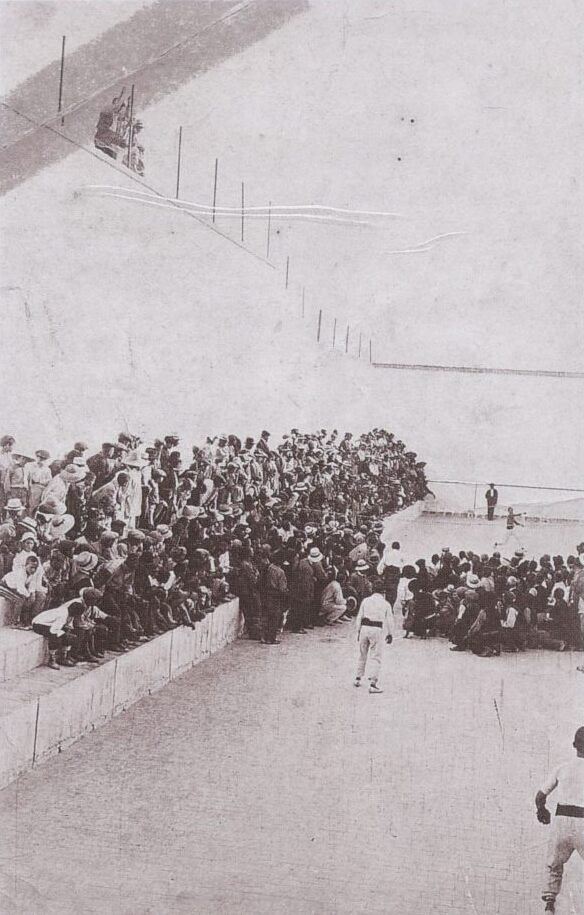
Escala i corda match, 1925

Being played by low-class people and high-class nobles, Valencian pilota was very popular: on 14 June 1391 the Valencia City Council fruitlessly forbade it to be played on the streets, but this caused the expansion of trinquets (courtfields); there were as many as 13 in that city alone in the 16th century. Later on, nobles abandoned the handball game in favour of "cleaner" sports and so pilota became the property of the middle and lower classes, which led to the appearance of the first professional players and the rise of gambling and challenge matches.

The break between indoor and outdoor forms caused many variants to diverge from the original Llargues version. Thus Perxa evolved into Galotxa, and which in turn gave rise to Escala i corda, while Raspall was still played in both courtfields. llargues is the only variant that uses the original "ratlles" rule, the others using a net to separate two sides on the playing area (as galotxa, and escala i corda), or with no court division at all (raspall). Another case is the Frontó variety, which was first documented in the late 19th century, influenced by the popularity of the main Basque pelota variant, which involves players throwing the ball against a wall.

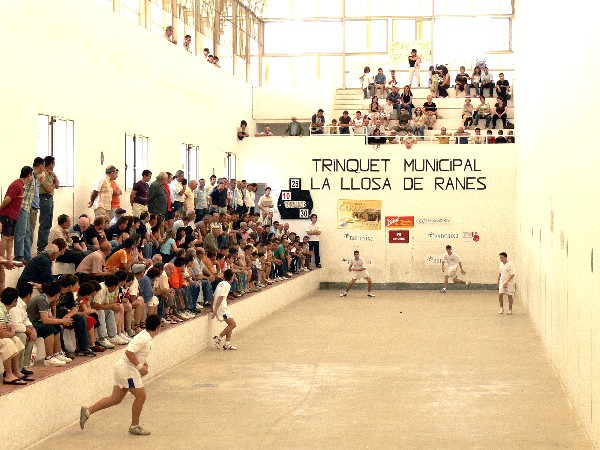
Raspall match, 2007

Nowadays, Valencian pilota is played in the whole Valencian Community, but every area has its preferred variety. Professional players of Escala i corda and Raspall are hired to play at the trinquets or in streets during the towns' festivals. The popularity of this sport is rising again with the building of new cortifields at schools, weekly broadcasts on Valencian public TV, the management of a professional company (ValNet) and the Handball International Championships with countries where these sports with a common origin are played.

== Playing area ==
There are two basic versions of the sport depending whether it is played outdoors in a designated street or indoors.

- Variations of the game played in the street are Galotxa, Llargues and Raspall. The streets must be long and wide (Llargues or "longs" is the one which needs the most elongated playing ground). If the streets have some irregularities, such as balconies, lights, sidewalks, traffic signals, etc., they may be used in order to score. Some municipalities have built "fake streets" which look like real ones but are meant only for pilota games.
- As for the ones played indoors there are:
  - Frare: Is a short Valencian frontó with bevels on the corners that cause the ball to bounce unexpectedly. Mostly played in the North of the Castelló province.
  - Frontó: Valencian frontons 20 to 30 metres (66 to 98 ft) long courts with a 6 metres (20 ft) high wall, frontis, against which the players bounce the ball off a rear wall where the ball may be bounced as well and another wall at the left of the players. The frontis has a 1 metre (3 ft 3 in) high line which marks the lowest point where a bouncing ball may hit.
  - Galotxetes: Played in a 20 by 3.5 metres (66 ft × 11 ft) space with a 1-metre (3 ft 3 in) high net in the middle. On the four corners there are open holes resembling doors where points are scored. Now it is only played in the Vinalopó Mitjà comarca, but the oldest court still in use dates from 1772 in Abdet (Marina Baixa).
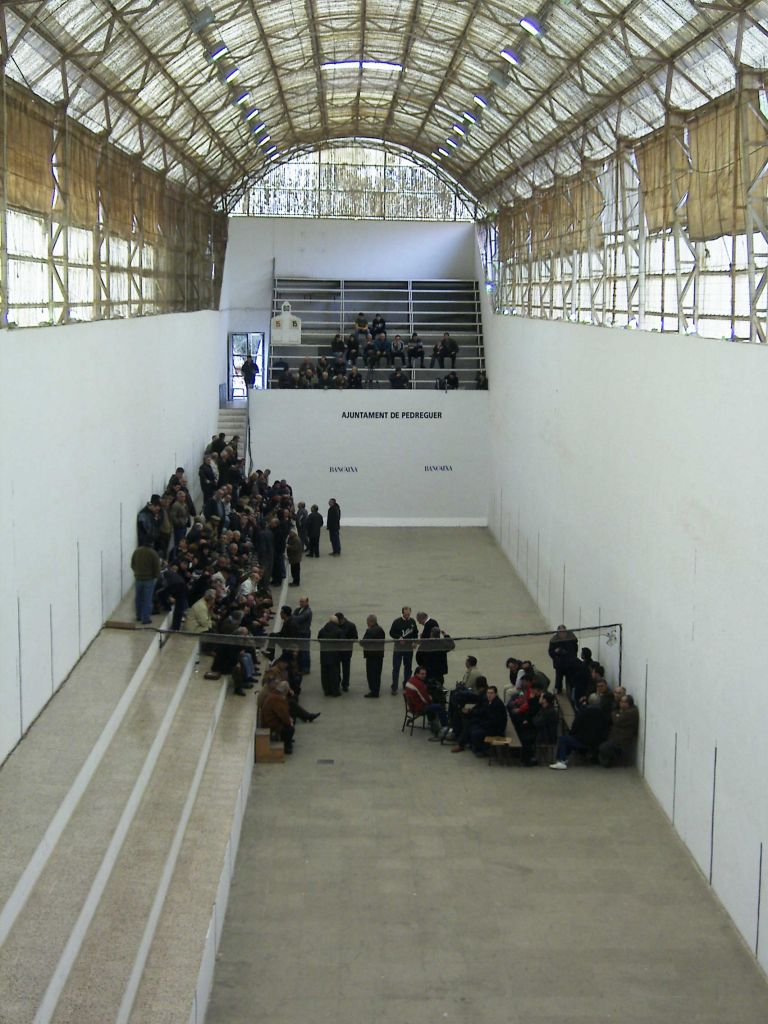
    Trinquet ready for an Escala i corda game
  - Trinquet: There is a 60-by-10-metre (196 ft 10 in × 32 ft 10 in) four walled court with stairs (escala) on one side for the spectators to sit. There are also two galleries over each of the frontons (shortest walls) for people to sit. There is a bottom balcony (llotgeta) where reputed people or professional betters may sit, similar to a box in other stadiums. Next to the llotgeta a square is drawn on the ground: the dau, where players start the game. In order to play Escala i corda rules a 2-metre (6 ft 7 in) high net (corda) must be placed in the middle of the court. One of the most reputed is the Pelayo trinquet in Valencia. See also the List of Valencian trinquets.

== Variations ==
With the basic set of rules for either street or indoor pilota, there are many different variations, some of them are played only locally, but most of them are played in wider areas. The only modalities with professional players are Escala i corda and Raspall.

Another way to categorize variations is whether they are direct or indirect. The direct games are those whose players are opposed face-to-face in different sides of the court, which is sometimes divided by a net; the indirect games are those with a wall where both teams throw the ball from a shared court. The traditional variations of Pilota Valenciana are direct, even though recently some indirect games ("Frontó" and "Frares") have been introduced based on the Basque Pelota.

=== Direct games ===
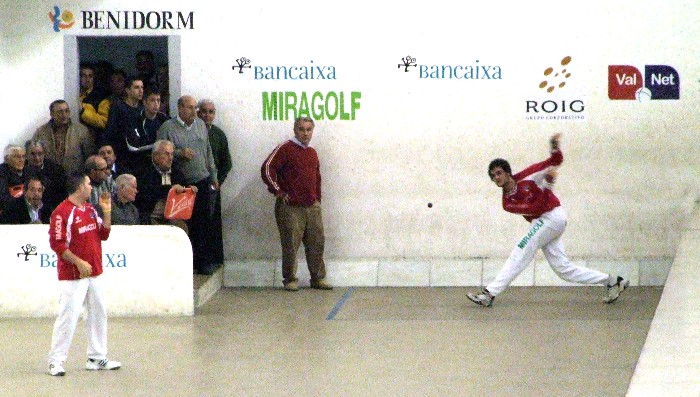
Escala i corda

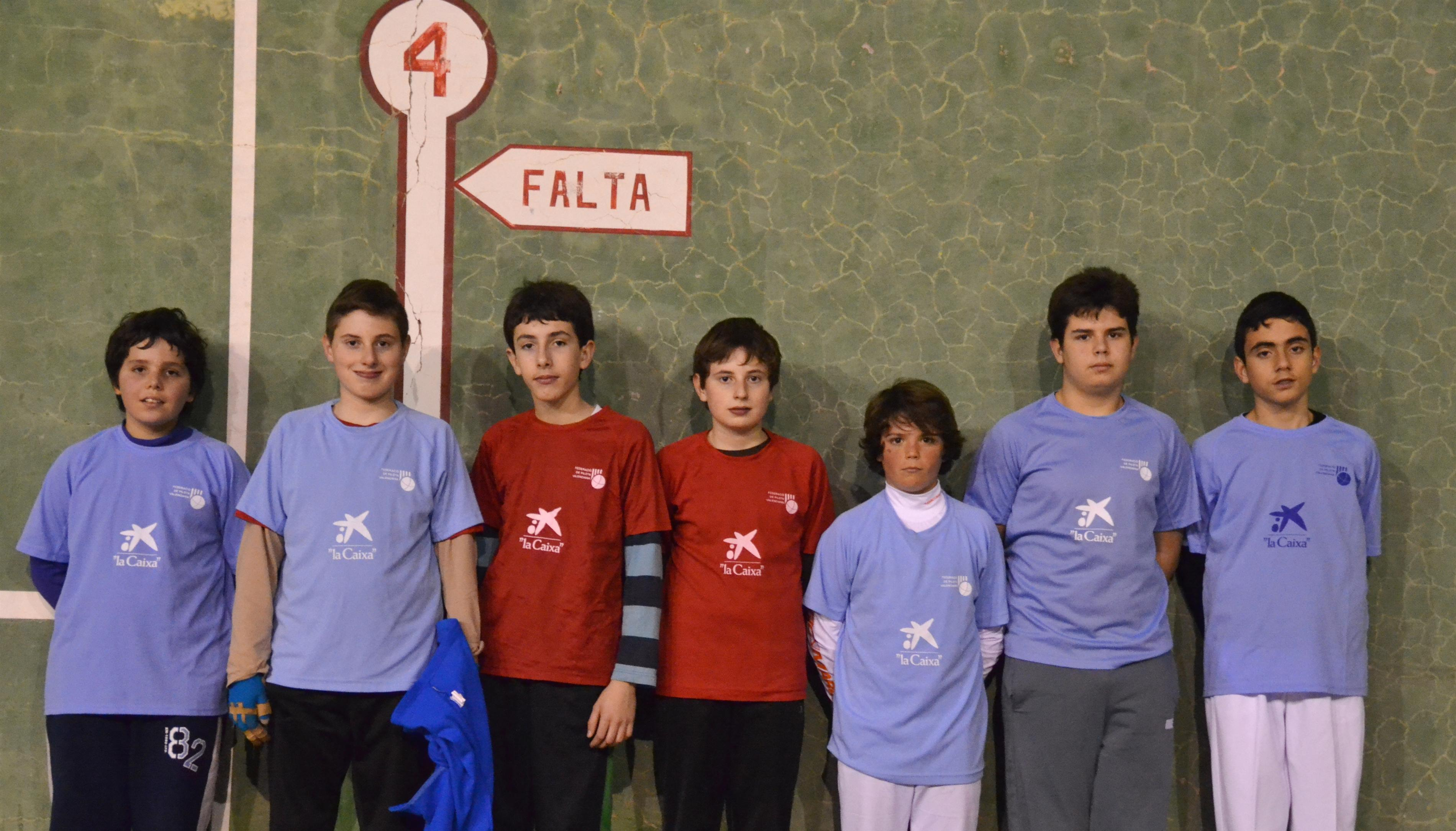
- Escala i corda: A more prestigious game and (alongside Raspall) the only one played professionally. It is played in a trinquet where a 1.8m high net is placed in the middle of the field. The ball must be thrown between players over the net, but can be aimed anywhere, mostly to special places such as the galeries or the llotgeta where a direct point is scored.
- Galotxa: This can be played in both regular streets or fake streets built solely for playing. The game resembles Escala i corda but with two nets and many more tricks, such as using irregularities in the street (like bumps or existing features from daily life like traffic signs) to score.
- Galotxetes: Now it's only played in Monòver, Pinoso and La Romana, all in the Vinalopó Mitjà comarca, similar to Escala i corda but shorter and with a different ball.

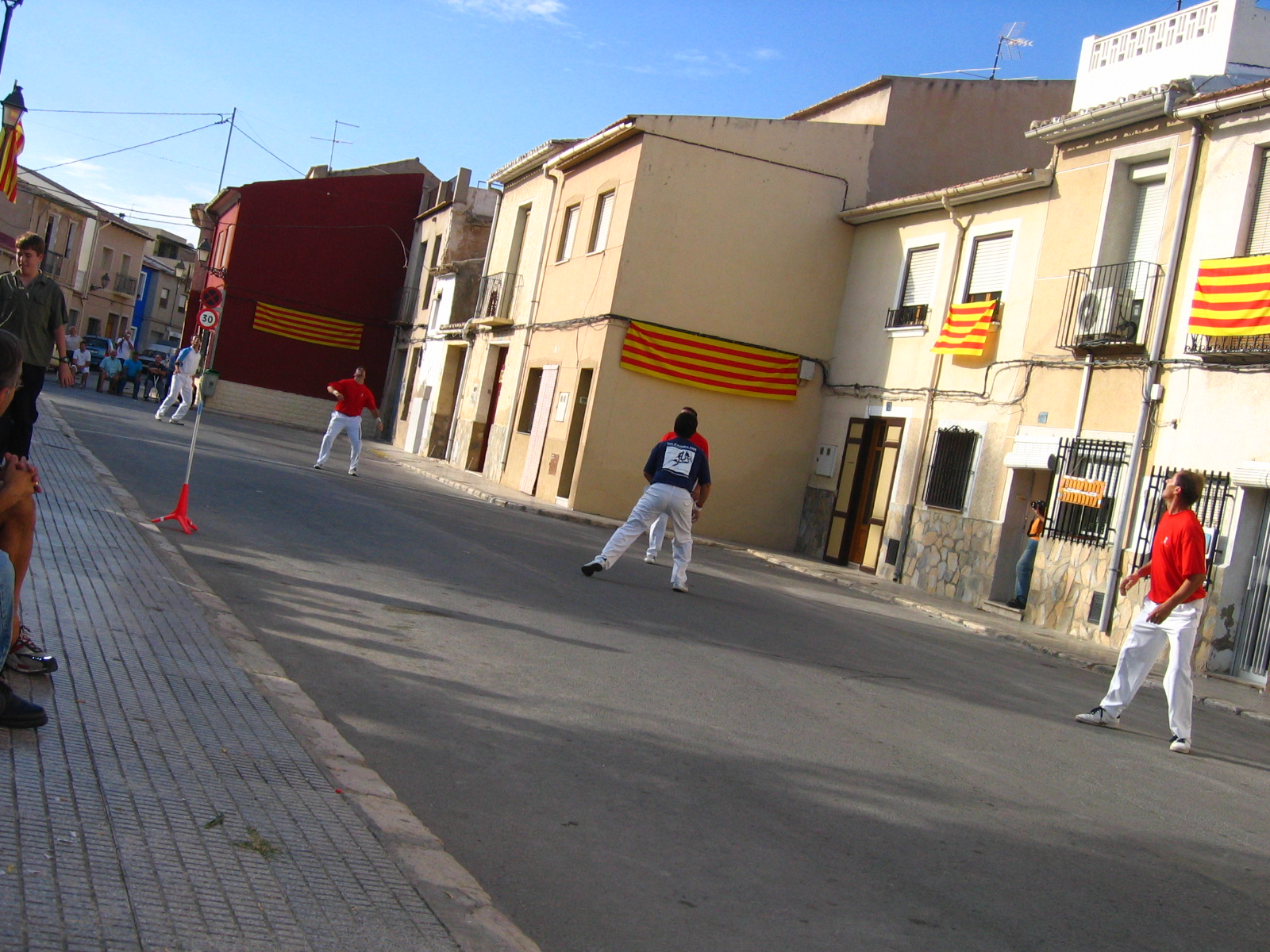
Llargues game at Sant Joan d'Alacant

- Llargues: This version can only be played in regular streets. It's said to be the oldest game. There is no net or field separating the teams. Each point is won twice: The first time the ball is stopped a ratlla (line) is marked on the ground. The second time the ball is stopped it has been thrown over that ratlla, the point is won by the sender.
- Raspall: Similar to Escala i corda as it's played in a trinquet, but without any net and the ball may bounce as many times as needed. Since players are forced to play stooped many times, it is considered the hardest variation to play. For example, Escala i corda games are won by the team who gets 60 points, but Raspall are played until 40.

=== Indirect games ===
- Frare
- Frontó

== International games ==
=== Llargues, international game and fronton ===
The only Valencian pilota variety played outside the Valencian community is Llargues. Every year a European championship is held by the International Ball game Confederation with players from Valencia, Belgium, France, Italy, and the Netherlands. There is also a world championship with those teams plus Argentina, Colombia, Mexico and Peru.

The Handball International Championships combine local handball variations from all over Europe to create the "international game" using the shared traits from all the sports related or derived from the jeu de paume. Valencian professional players do not need much adaptation, since Llargues is very close to the international rules.

Another case is the international fronton, another invented variety that takes back the indirect style to its basics: one wall where the ball must bounce.

=== Relationship with Basque pelota ===
From the Basque Pelota modalities played in the Basque Country the ones called "bote luzea", "mahi jokoa" are extinct but, by all accounts they were extremely similar to what has been preserved in Valencian Pilota as Llargues, but using a bigger and heavier ball.

An example of the compatibility there used to be between Valencian Llargues and Basque a la larga modalities was the existence during the 19th century of a sort of early professional side to the sport, with players from elsewhere earning high amounts of money, such as Aragonese Lagasa and Valencian Amigó, who, for example, toured in Navarre during September 1680.

In October 2006, for the first time, a Navarrese youth team played Llargues against a Valencian one during the "Pilota Day" celebrated in Valencia (in the adult match, the Valencian community team played the Frisian team from the Netherlands). At the moment the only exchanges between both sports are friendly matches of Frontó, which is the main modality for Basques but a mostly irrelevant one for Valencians. In summer, or for special events, exhibition matches are organized, as the "Open Ciutat de València", with particular rules (such as the length of the court), and balls of intermediate size and diameter (70 gr.) between the kinds that both regions are accustomed to.

=== 1992 Summer Olympics ===
The Valencian pilota was a demonstration sport in the 1992 Summer Olympics hosted in Barcelona.

== Balls ==
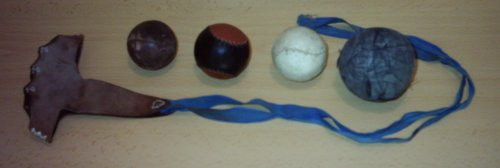
Left to right: Vaqueta, badana, tec and galotxetes balls. Below left is a leather glove

Every version of the game uses its own kind of ball. Each kind is different in weight, size, the way it bounces and other aspects. They are all handmade by specialized crafters.

- Badana ball: Used for Llargues, it is a soft ball which can be played without any protection, since llargues are played on the streets. The bounce is very irregular, causing the ball to be almost incapable of regular bouncing. It is made of rags and sheep skin, and usually weighs 39 grams (1.4 oz) with a diameter of 38 millimetres (1.5 in).
- Galotxetes ball: Used only for Galotxetes, it is very big and heavy, but it can be played without protection. It cannot bounce. It is made of rags with sticking pasters. It weighs 60 grams (2.1 oz) with a diameter of 70 millimetres (2.8 in).
- Tec ball: Used for Valencian frontó, it is a very fast bouncing ball. Because it is very hard, protection is required. The ball takes its name from its characteristic sound. It is made of wood, and covered with goat skin. The ball usually weighs 48–50 grams (1.7–1.8 oz) and has a diameter of 50 millimetres (2.0 in).
- Vaqueta ball: Used for Escala i corda and Raspall, it is a very fast ball and bounces well. Players must wear protective equipment. It is made of wood and covered with leather. It weighs 40–42 grams (1.4–1.5 oz) and has a diameter of 42 millimetres (1.7 in).

== Betting ==
Betting is inherent to the sport in its professional version and it is arguably the main factor which has kept the game alive, unlike similar games played elsewhere which ended up fading away. This is because betting allows professional players to exist, which creates rivalries and increases the entertaining dimension of the sport for the audience. Spectators of Valencian pilota can bet on one of the two sides, and the trinquets and the marxador gets a commission from these bets.

The two teams dress either with red or blue shirts. Bets are made for one color (red or blue) winning, for a certain margin of victory points, or for an expected way to score each particular point.

Remarkably high amounts of money may be bet during relevant games involving famous players. The more famous players become, the more betting is involved and so their personal revenue.

== Players ==
Valencian pilota players are called pilotaris or pilotaires. Usually amateur players are only proficient in one variant, but professional players tend to be hired for social events and exhibitions in other variants. There are now only two variants with professional players: Escala i corda and Raspall.

Traditionally, each player managed his own agenda and arranged his fees, but in 2005 a new company, ValNet, presided over by the retired pilotari Fredi contracted almost all professional players.

For a list of relevant historical or active players, see Valencian pilotaris. Also, see below for the existing professional leagues and competitions.

=== Renowned active pilotaris ===
- Álvaro
- Sarasol II
- Waldo

=== Retired pilotaris ===
- Genovés I
- Juliet d'Alginet
- Nel de Murla
- Quart
- Rovellet
- Sarasol I

== Professional Leagues and competitions ==
Escala i Corda

- Trofeu Individual Bancaixa, singles
  - Trofeu Individual Bancaixa 2007
- Circuit Bancaixa, teams
  - Circuit Bancaixa 07/08

Raspall

- Raspall team championship, teams
- Raspall singles championship, singles

== See also ==
- Basque Pelota
- Frisian handball
- Longue paume
- Tuscan Pelota
- Pallone

== Videos ==
- Youtube: 7 videos featuring the 1993 Escala i Corda Individual final match, Genovés I vs. Sarasol I
- Pilota valenciana: Joc i tradició. 15 minutes documentary
