= Julio Palau Lozano =

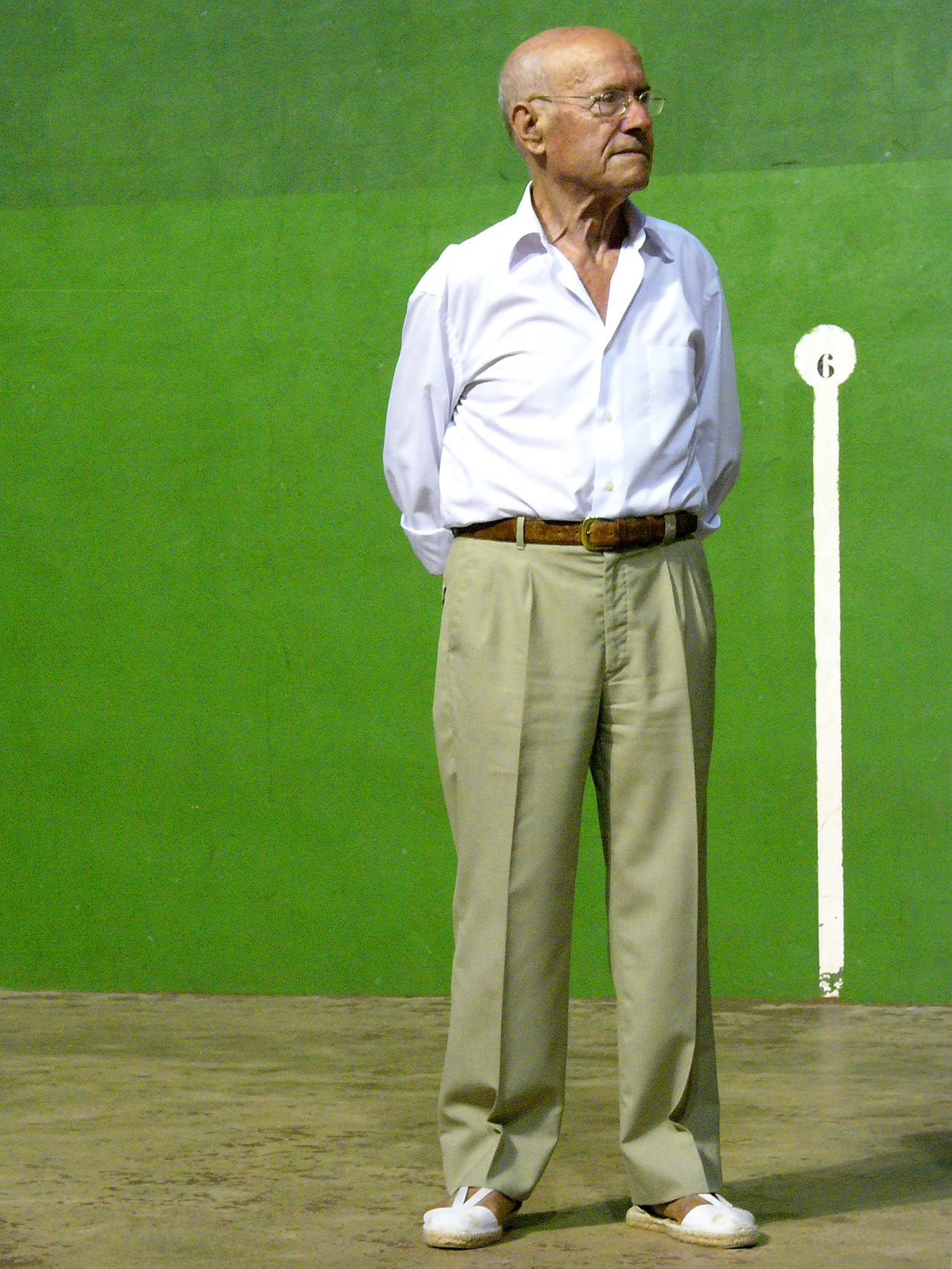
Juliet, 2009, in a homage in Alginet.

Julio Palau Lozano (Alginet, 1925-2015) was a professional Valencian pilota Escala i corda variant player known as Juliet d'Alginet. He is one of only five players in the Pelayo trinquet's Honor gallery.

He retired in 1968 and died on 7 November 2015.
