= El Genovés, Spain =

El Genovés
- Municipality
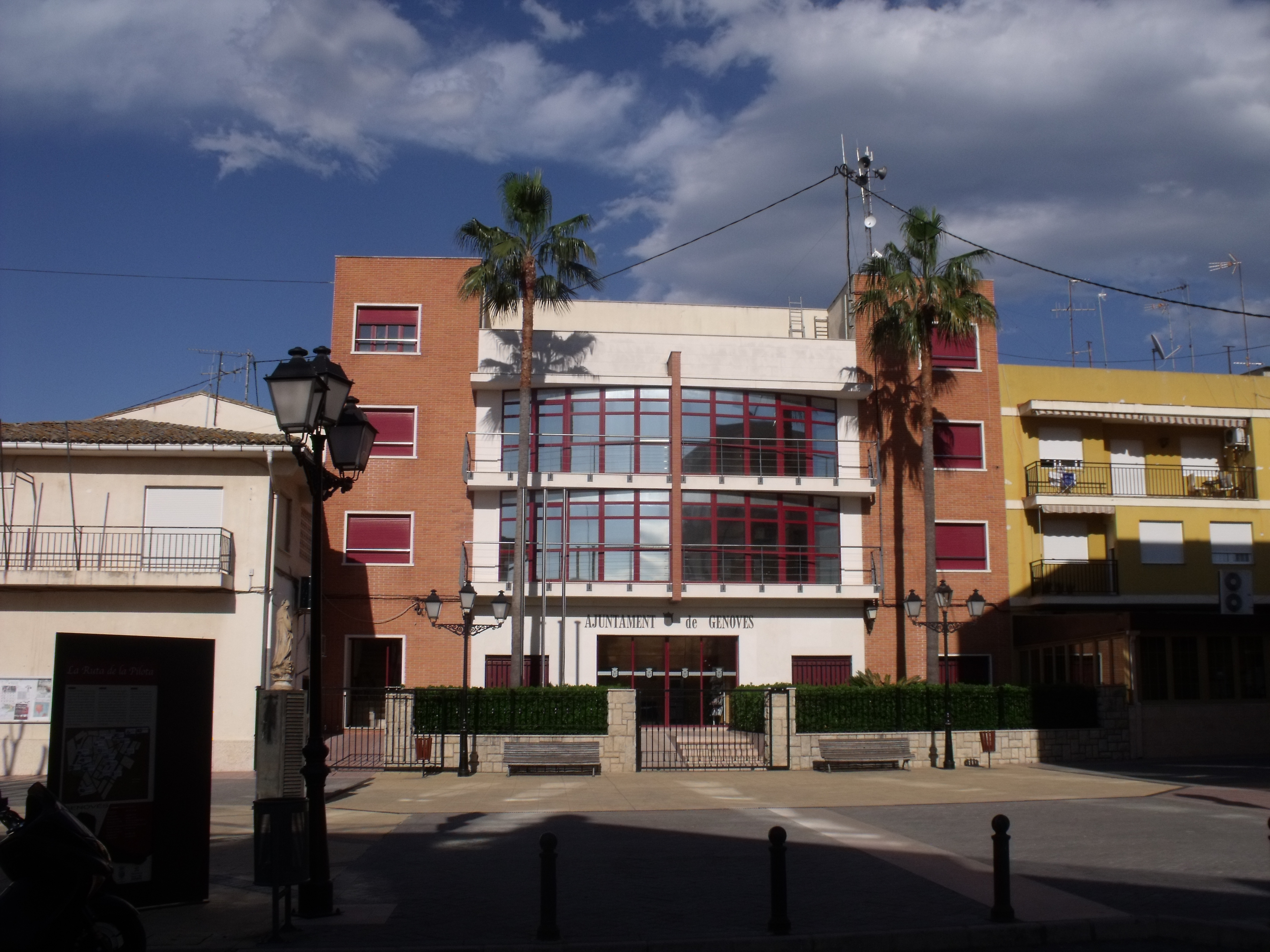
- Town hall

- Coat of arms

- Location in Spain
- Coordinates: 38°59′20″N 0°28′13″W
- Country: Spain
- Autonomous community: Valencian Community
- Province: Valencia
- Comarca: Costera
- Judicial district: Xàtiva

Government
  - Alcalde: Emilio Llopis Oltra

Area
  - Total: 15.2 km^{2} (5.9 sq mi)
- Elevation: 120 m (390 ft)

Population (2025-01-01)
  - Total: 2,822
  - Density: 186/km^{2} (481/sq mi)
- Demonym: Genovesí /ina
- Time zone: UTC+1 (CET)
  - Summer (DST): UTC+2 (CEST)
- Postal code: 46894
- Official language(s): Valencian
- Website: Official website

El Genovés is a municipality in the comarca of Costera in the Valencian Community, Spain.

== See also ==
- List of municipalities in Valencia
